= 2003 Sagan Tosu season =

Sagan Tosu
2003 season
- Manager: Yoshinori Sembiki
- Stadium: Tosu Stadium
- J. League 2: 12th
- Emperor's Cup: 1st Round
- Top goalscorer: Omi Sato (6); Jefferson (6)
Home colours	Away colours

2003 Sagan Tosu season

== Competitions ==
Competitions	Position
J. League 2	12th / 12 clubs
Emperor's Cup	1st Round

== Domestic results ==
=== J. League 2 ===
Match	Date	Venue	Opponents	Score
1	2003.3.15	Kose Sports Stadium	Ventforet Kofu	1-1
2	2003.3.23	Tosu Stadium	Sanfrecce Hiroshima	3-4
3	2003.3.29	Ōmiya Park Soccer Stadium	Omiya Ardija	0-1
4	2003.4.5	Tosu Stadium	Avispa Fukuoka	2-3
5	2003.4.9	Hiratsuka Athletics Stadium	Shonan Bellmare	1-2
6	2003.4.13	Tosu Stadium	Kawasaki Frontale	0-0
7	2003.4.19	Yamagata Park Stadium	Montedio Yamagata	1-4
8	2003.4.26	Hitachinaka City Stadium	Mito HollyHock	0-1
9	2003.4.29	Tosu Stadium	Consadole Sapporo	1-0
10	2003.5.5	Mitsuzawa Stadium	Yokohama F.C.	1-1
11	2003.5.10	Tosu Stadium	Albirex Niigata	0-1
12	2003.5.14	Tosu Stadium	Ventforet Kofu	1-1
13	2003.5.17	Hiroshima Big Arch	Sanfrecce Hiroshima	1-2
14	2003.5.25	Tosu Stadium	Omiya Ardija	3-2
15	2003.5.31	Hakata no mori stadium	Avispa Fukuoka	2-5
16	2003.6.8	Tosu Stadium	Yokohama F.C.	5-2
17	2003.6.14	Niigata Stadium	Albirex Niigata	1-2
18	2003.6.18	Tosu Stadium	Mito HollyHock	0-0
19	2003.6.22	Tosu Stadium	Montedio Yamagata	1-3
20	2003.6.28	Todoroki Athletics Stadium	Kawasaki Frontale	3-6
21	2003.7.2	Tosu Stadium	Shonan Bellmare	0-0
22	2003.7.5	Sapporo Atsubetsu Park Stadium	Consadole Sapporo	0-3
23	2003.7.19	Tosu Stadium	Albirex Niigata	0-1
24	2003.7.26	Tosu Stadium	Sanfrecce Hiroshima	2-2
25	2003.7.30	Kose Sports Stadium	Ventforet Kofu	0-2
26	2003.8.2	Tosu Stadium	Avispa Fukuoka	0-2
27	2003.8.10	Mitsuzawa Stadium	Yokohama F.C.	1-3
28	2003.8.16	Yamagata Park Stadium	Montedio Yamagata	1-1
29	2003.8.23	Tosu Stadium	Kawasaki Frontale	0-2
30	2003.8.30	Hiratsuka Athletics Stadium	Shonan Bellmare	1-2
31	2003.9.3	Kasamatsu Stadium	Mito HollyHock	0-1
32	2003.9.6	Tosu Stadium	Consadole Sapporo	0-1
33	2003.9.14	Ōmiya Park Soccer Stadium	Omiya Ardija	0-3
34	2003.9.20	Tosu Stadium	Montedio Yamagata	0-1
35	2003.9.23	Todoroki Athletics Stadium	Kawasaki Frontale	1-7
36	2003.9.27	Niigata Stadium	Albirex Niigata	1-2
37	2003.10.5	Saga Stadium	Mito HollyHock	0-1
38	2003.10.11	Sapporo Atsubetsu Park Stadium	Consadole Sapporo	1-4
39	2003.10.19	Tosu Stadium	Yokohama F.C.	1-1
40	2003.10.26	Tosu Stadium	Shonan Bellmare	0-0
41	2003.11.1	Hakata no mori stadium	Avispa Fukuoka	1-2
42	2003.11.9	Tosu Stadium	Omiya Ardija	1-4
43	2003.11.15	Hiroshima Big Arch	Sanfrecce Hiroshima	1-2
44	2003.11.23	Tosu Stadium	Ventforet Kofu	1-1

=== Emperor's Cup ===
Match	Date	Venue	Opponents	Score
1st Round	2003..			-

== Player statistics ==
No.	Pos.	Player	D.o.B. (Age)	Height / Weight	J. League 2		Emperor's Cup		Total	
No.	Pos.	Player	D.o.B. (Age)	Height / Weight	Apps	Goals	Apps	Goals	Apps	Goals
1	GK	Norio Takahashi	March 15, 1971 (aged 32)	cm / kg	12	0				
2	DF	Shin Asahina	August 20, 1976 (aged 26)	cm / kg	26	2				
3	DF	Takuji Miyoshi	August 20, 1978 (aged 24)	cm / kg	14	2				
4	DF	Rikiya Kawamae	August 20, 1971 (aged 31)	cm / kg	30	1				
5	DF	Satoshi Miyagawa	March 24, 1977 (aged 25)	cm / kg	21	3				
6	MF	Katsuhiro Suzuki	November 26, 1977 (aged 25)	cm / kg	40	0				
7	FW	Omi Sato	December 22, 1975 (aged 27)	cm / kg	30	6				
8	FW	Tatsuomi Koishi	August 22, 1977 (aged 25)	cm / kg	29	0				
9	FW	Hiroki Hattori	August 30, 1971 (aged 31)	cm / kg	29	2				
10	MF	Motoki Kawasaki	February 2, 1979 (aged 24)	cm / kg	35	4				
11	MF	Naohiro Tamura	July 3, 1978 (aged 24)	cm / kg	6	0				
13	MF	Takashi Furukawa	October 28, 1981 (aged 21)	cm / kg	10	0				
14	GK	Junnosuke Schneider	May 24, 1977 (aged 25)	cm / kg	10	0				
15	DF	Keisuke Mori	April 17, 1980 (aged 22)	cm / kg	17	2				
16	DF	Yoshiro Nakamura	October 17, 1979 (aged 23)	cm / kg	22	0				
17	DF	Kohei Yamamichi	May 11, 1980 (aged 22)	cm / kg	15	0				
18	FW	Satoshi Ōtomo	October 1, 1981 (aged 21)	cm / kg	31	1				
19	MF	Naoki Ishibashi	May 14, 1981 (aged 21)	cm / kg	1	0				
19	DF	Pericles	January 2, 1975 (aged 28)	cm / kg	8	0				
20	FW	Naoki Naruo	October 5, 1974 (aged 28)	cm / kg	38	5				
21	GK	Koji Fujikawa	October 7, 1978 (aged 24)	cm / kg	22	0				
22	MF	Daisuke Yoneyama	June 10, 1982 (aged 20)	cm / kg	23	2				
23	MF	Junior	October 15, 1977 (aged 25)	cm / kg	2	0				
23	MF	Juninho	July 7, 1982 (aged 20)	cm / kg	19	1				
24	DF	Jun Ideguchi	May 14, 1979 (aged 23)	cm / kg	11	1				
25	DF	Bruno Cabrerizo	July 19, 1979 (aged 23)	cm / kg	13	1				
25	MF	Hiromasa Suguri	July 29, 1976 (aged 26)	cm / kg	17	0				
26	MF	Jiro Yabe	May 26, 1978 (aged 24)	cm / kg	13	0				
27	DF	Haruhiko Sato	June 27, 1978 (aged 24)	cm / kg	31	0				
28	FW	Jefferson	July 3, 1981 (aged 21)	cm / kg	30	6				

== Other pages ==
- (in Japanese) J. League official site
