= 2002 Sagan Tosu season =

Sagan Tosu
2002 season
- Manager: Hiroshi Soejima
- Stadium: Tosu Stadium
- J. League 2: 9th
- Emperor's Cup: 3rd Round
- Top goalscorer: Hiroshi Morita (14)
Home colours	Away colours

2002 Sagan Tosu season

== Competitions ==
Competitions	Position
J. League 2	9th / 12 clubs
Emperor's Cup	3rd Round

== Domestic results ==
=== J. League 2 ===
Match	Date	Venue	Opponents	Score
1	2002.3.3	Ōmiya Park Soccer Stadium	Omiya Ardija	1-1
2	2002.3.10	Tosu Stadium	Cerezo Osaka	0-2
3	2002.3.17	Tosu Stadium	Montedio Yamagata	1-0
4	2002.3.21	Ōita Stadium	Oita Trinita	0-2
5	2002.3.24	Tosu Stadium	Albirex Niigata	1-1
6	2002.3.30	Hitachinaka City Stadium	Mito HollyHock	0-3
7	2002.4.6	Tosu Stadium	Kawasaki Frontale	0-2
8	2002.4.10	Kose Sports Stadium	Ventforet Kofu	1-1
9	2002.4.13	Tosu Stadium	Shonan Bellmare	0-1
10	2002.4.20	Yokohama Mitsuzawa Football Stadium	Yokohama F.C.	2-1
11	2002.4.24	Tosu Stadium	Avispa Fukuoka	1-1
12	2002.4.27	Ojiyama Stadium, Ōtsu City	Cerezo Osaka	1-2
13	2002.5.3	Tosu Stadium	Oita Trinita	0-1
14	2002.5.6	Niigata City Athletic Stadium	Albirex Niigata	2-6
15	2002.5.12	Tosu Stadium	Mito HollyHock	0-1
16	2002.7.5	Todoroki Athletics Stadium	Kawasaki Frontale	1-2
17	2002.7.10	Tosu Stadium	Ventforet Kofu	0-0
18	2002.7.13	Hakata no mori stadium	Avispa Fukuoka	0-2
19	2002.7.20	Tosu Stadium	Omiya Ardija	2-1
20	2002.7.24	Hiratsuka Athletics Stadium	Shonan Bellmare	2-2
21	2002.7.27	Tosu Stadium	Yokohama F.C.	4-1
22	2002.8.3	Yamagata Park Stadium	Montedio Yamagata	0-0
23	2002.8.7	Hitachinaka City Stadium	Mito HollyHock	2-2
24	2002.8.10	Tosu Stadium	Avispa Fukuoka	1-0
25	2002.8.17	Kose Sports Stadium	Ventforet Kofu	0-0
26	2002.8.21	Tosu Stadium	Shonan Bellmare	1-2
27	2002.8.25	Tosu Stadium	Cerezo Osaka	1-1
28	2002.8.31	Ōmiya Park Soccer Stadium	Omiya Ardija	2-3
29	2002.9.7	Tosu Stadium	Kawasaki Frontale	0-2
30	2002.9.11	Yokohama Mitsuzawa Football Stadium	Yokohama F.C.	0-1
31	2002.9.15	Ōita Stadium	Oita Trinita	0-2
32	2002.9.21	Tosu Stadium	Albirex Niigata	0-2
33	2002.9.25	Yamagata Park Stadium	Montedio Yamagata	2-2
34	2002.9.29	Saga Stadium	Mito HollyHock	2-0
35	2002.10.5	Hiratsuka Athletics Stadium	Shonan Bellmare	0-0
36	2002.10.9	Saga Stadium	Yokohama F.C.	1-0
37	2002.10.13	Tosu Stadium	Oita Trinita	2-3
38	2002.10.19	Nagai Stadium	Cerezo Osaka	1-2
39	2002.10.23	Tosu Stadium	Montedio Yamagata	1-0
40	2002.10.29	Niigata City Athletic Stadium	Albirex Niigata	1-1
41	2002.11.2	Todoroki Athletics Stadium	Kawasaki Frontale	1-2
42	2002.11.10	Tosu Stadium	Ventforet Kofu	1-4
43	2002.11.16	Hakata no mori stadium	Avispa Fukuoka	1-1
44	2002.11.24	Tosu Stadium	Omiya Ardija	2-1

=== Emperor's Cup ===
Match	Date	Venue	Opponents	Score
1st Round	2002..	[[]]	[[]]	-
2nd Round	2002..	[[]]	[[]]	-
3rd Round	2002..	[[]]	[[]]	-

== Player statistics ==
No.	Pos.	Player	D.o.B. (Age)	Height / Weight	J. League 2		Emperor's Cup		Total	
No.	Pos.	Player	D.o.B. (Age)	Height / Weight	Apps	Goals	Apps	Goals	Apps	Goals
1	GK	Tetsuharu Yamaguchi	September 8, 1977 (aged 24)	cm / kg	18	0				
2	DF	Takuji Miyoshi	August 20, 1978 (aged 23)	cm / kg	34	0				
3	DF	Kohei Yamamichi	May 11, 1980 (aged 21)	cm / kg	24	0				
4	DF	Rikiya Kawamae	August 20, 1971 (aged 30)	cm / kg	41	0				
5	DF	Yoshinori Matsuda	August 14, 1974 (aged 27)	cm / kg	9	0				
6	DF	Keisuke Mori	April 17, 1980 (aged 21)	cm / kg	15	0				
7	FW	Omi Sato	December 22, 1975 (aged 26)	cm / kg	40	4				
8	MF	Kosei Kitauchi	April 25, 1974 (aged 27)	cm / kg	22	0				
9	MF	Naoki Ishibashi	May 14, 1981 (aged 20)	cm / kg	14	0				
10	MF	Katsuhiro Suzuki	November 26, 1977 (aged 24)	cm / kg	27	0				
11	MF	Motoki Kawasaki	February 2, 1979 (aged 23)	cm / kg	39	3				
13	DF	Koichi Sekimoto	May 23, 1978 (aged 23)	cm / kg	16	0				
14	DF	Shuichi Kamimura	September 1, 1981 (aged 20)	cm / kg	0	0				
15	MF	Kenji Takagi	May 13, 1976 (aged 25)	cm / kg	17	0				
16	GK	Koji Fujikawa	October 7, 1978 (aged 23)	cm / kg	2	0				
17	MF	Koichi Higashi	August 23, 1978 (aged 23)	cm / kg	0	0				
17	MF	Naohiro Tamura	July 3, 1978 (aged 23)	cm / kg	22	0				
18	FW	Ryo Fukudome	June 26, 1978 (aged 23)	cm / kg	0	0				
19	DF	Satoshi Miyagawa	March 24, 1977 (aged 24)	cm / kg	22	1				
20	FW	Yoshiyuki Takemoto	October 3, 1973 (aged 28)	cm / kg	19	1				
21	GK	Junnosuke Schneider	May 22, 1977 (aged 24)	cm / kg	24	0				
22	FW	Hiroshi Morita	May 18, 1978 (aged 23)	cm / kg	38	14				
23	FW	Tatsuomi Koishi	August 22, 1977 (aged 24)	cm / kg	31	3				
24	MF	Shinsuke Shimabukuro	January 13, 1983 (aged 19)	cm / kg	0	0				
25	MF	Takashi Furukawa	October 28, 1981 (aged 20)	cm / kg	18	0				
26	MF	Jiro Yabe	May 26, 1978 (aged 23)	cm / kg	40	3				
27	DF	Haruhiko Sato	June 27, 1978 (aged 23)	cm / kg	37	2				
28	GK	Erikson Noguchipinto	January 27, 1981 (aged 21)	cm / kg	1	0				
29	MF	David Bisconti	September 22, 1968 (aged 33)	cm / kg	24	10				
30	DF	Koji Maeda	February 3, 1969 (aged 33)	cm / kg	16	0				

== Other pages ==
- (in Japanese) J. League official site
