= 2001 Sagan Tosu season =

Sagan Tosu
2001 season
- Manager: Kazuhiro Koso
- Stadium: Tosu Stadium
- J.League 2: 10th
- Emperor's Cup: 4th Round
- J.League Cup: 1st Round
- Top goalscorer: Omi Sato (10)
Home colours	Away colours

2001 Sagan Tosu season

== Competitions ==
Competitions	Position
J.League 2	10th / 12 clubs
Emperor's Cup	4th round
J.League Cup	1st round

== Domestic results ==
=== J.League 2 ===
11 March 2001 1	Sagan Tosu	1-1 (GG) (a.e.t.)	Albirex Niigata	Tosu Stadium
JST (UTC+09)

17 March 2001 2	Sagan Tosu	0-1	Kawasaki Frontale	Tosu Stadium
JST (UTC+09)

24 March 2001 3	Shonan Bellmare	1-0 (GG) (a.e.t.)	Sagan Tosu	Hiratsuka Athletics Stadium
JST (UTC+09)

31 March 2001 4	Sagan Tosu	1-4	Vegalta Sendai	Tosu Stadium
JST (UTC+09)

7 April 2001 5	Oita Trinita	2-0	Sagan Tosu	Oita Athletic Stadium
JST (UTC+09)

14 April 2001 6	Sagan Tosu	1-2	Omiya Ardija	Tosu Stadium
JST (UTC+09)

21 April 2001 7	Mito HollyHock	3-3 (GG) (a.e.t.)	Sagan Tosu	Tochigi Green Stadium
JST (UTC+09)

28 April 2001 8	Sagan Tosu	0-1	Yokohama FC	Tosu Stadium
JST (UTC+09)

3 May 2001 9	Ventforet Kofu	2-0	Sagan Tosu	Kose Sports Park Stadium
JST (UTC+09)

6 May 2001 10	Montedio Yamagata	0-0 (GG) (a.e.t.)	Sagan Tosu	Yamagata Park Stadium
JST (UTC+09)

13 May 2001 11	Sagan Tosu	1-3	Kyoto Purple Sanga	Tosu Stadium
JST (UTC+09)

19 May 2001 12	Kawasaki Frontale	6-1	Sagan Tosu	Todoroki Athletics Stadium
JST (UTC+09)

23 May 2001 13	Sagan Tosu	1-2	Shonan Bellmare	Tosu Stadium
JST (UTC+09)

26 May 2001 14	Omiya Ardija	3-0	Sagan Tosu	Omiya Football Stadium
JST (UTC+09)

17 June 2001 15	Sagan Tosu	2-0	Mito HollyHock	Tosu Stadium
JST (UTC+09)

23 June 2001 16	Sagan Tosu	0-1	Montedio Yamagata	Tosu Stadium
JST (UTC+09)

29 June 2001 17	Kyoto Purple Sanga	2-1 (GG) (a.e.t.)	Sagan Tosu	Nishikyogoku Athletic Stadium
JST (UTC+09)

8 July 2001 18	Yokohama FC	2-1	Sagan Tosu	Yokohama Mitsuzawa Stadium
JST (UTC+09)

11 July 2001 19	Sagan Tosu	4-0	Ventforet Kofu	Tosu Stadium
JST (UTC+09)

14 July 2001 20	Albirex Niigata	5-0	Sagan Tosu	Niigata Stadium
JST (UTC+09)

21 July 2001 21	Vegalta Sendai	3-1	Sagan Tosu	Sendai Stadium
JST (UTC+09)

25 July 2001 22	Sagan Tosu	1-3	Oita Trinita	Tosu Stadium
JST (UTC+09)

28 July 2001 23	Sagan Tosu	1-0	Kyoto Purple Sanga	Tosu Stadium
JST (UTC+09)

3 August 2001 24	Shonan Bellmare	1-2 (GG) (a.e.t.)	Sagan Tosu	Hiratsuka Athletics Stadium
JST (UTC+09)

11 August 2001 25	Sagan Tosu	0-3	Yokohama FC	Nagasaki Athletic Stadium
JST (UTC+09)

14 August 2001 26	Ventforet Kofu	1-5	Sagan Tosu	Kose Sports Park Stadium
JST (UTC+09)

19 August 2001 27	Sagan Tosu	2-1	Omiya Ardija	Tosu Stadium
JST (UTC+09)

25 August 2001 28	Mito HollyHock	3-2	Sagan Tosu	Hitachinaka City Stadium
JST (UTC+09)

1 September 2001 29	Sagan Tosu	1-2	Vegalta Sendai	Tosu Stadium
JST (UTC+09)

5 September 2001 30	Oita Trinita	2-1	Sagan Tosu	Nagasaki Athletic Stadium
JST (UTC+09)

8 September 2001 31	Montedio Yamagata	2-0	Sagan Tosu	Yamagata Park Stadium
JST (UTC+09)

15 September 2001 32	Sagan Tosu	0-1	Kawasaki Frontale	Tosu Stadium
JST (UTC+09)

19 September 2001 33	Albirex Niigata	4-1	Sagan Tosu	Niigata Stadium
JST (UTC+09)

22 September 2001 34	Yokohama FC	1-0	Sagan Tosu	Technoport Fukui Stadium
JST (UTC+09)

30 September 2001 35	Sagan Tosu	2-1	Mito HollyHock	Tosu Stadium
JST (UTC+09)

6 October 2001 36	Omiya Ardija	1-0	Sagan Tosu	Omiya Football Stadium
JST (UTC+09)

13 October 2001 37	Sagan Tosu	2-0	Ventforet Kofu	Okinawa Athletic Stadium
JST (UTC+09)

17 October 2001 38	Sagan Tosu	0-3	Montedio Yamagata	Saga Stadium
JST (UTC+09)

20 October 2001 39	Kyoto Purple Sanga	2-1	Sagan Tosu	Nishikyogoku Athletic Stadium
JST (UTC+09)

28 October 2001 40	Sagan Tosu	0-1	Albirex Niigata	Tosu Stadium
JST (UTC+09)

3 November 2001 41	Kawasaki Frontale	2-0	Sagan Tosu	Nishigaoka Soccer Stadium
JST (UTC+09)

6 November 2001 42	Sagan Tosu	2-1	Shonan Bellmare	Tosu Stadium
JST (UTC+09)

11 November 2001 43	Vegalta Sendai	2-3 (GG) (a.e.t.)	Sagan Tosu	Sendai Stadium
JST (UTC+09)

18 November 2001 44	Sagan Tosu	1-1 (GG) (a.e.t.)	Oita Trinita	Tosu Stadium
JST (UTC+09)

=== Emperor's Cup ===
25 November 2001 1st Round	Fukuoka University	1-1 (GG) (a.e.t.) (1-3 p)	Sagan Tosu	Hakatanomori Football Stadium
JST (UTC+09)

2 December 2001 2nd Round	Sagan Tosu	1-0	Jatco	Tosu Stadium
JST (UTC+09)

9 December 2001 3rd Round	Kashiwa Reysol	1-2	Sagan Tosu	Hitachi Kashiwa Soccer Stadium
JST (UTC+09)

16 December 2001 4th Round	Kashima Antlers	6-0	Sagan Tosu	Ehime Matsuyama Athletic Stadium
JST (UTC+09)

=== J.League Cup ===
4 April 2001 1st Round-1	Sagan Tosu	1-3	Vissel Kobe	Tosu Stadium
JST (UTC+09)

18 April 2001 1st Round-2	Vissel Kobe	4-0 (7-1 agg.)	Sagan Tosu	Kobe Universiade Memorial Stadium
JST (UTC+09)

== Player statistics ==
No.	Pos.	Nat.	Player	D.o.B. (Age)	Height / Weight	J.League 2		Emperor's Cup		J.League Cup		Total	
No.	Pos.	Nat.	Player	D.o.B. (Age)	Height / Weight	Apps	Goals	Apps	Goals	Apps	Goals	Apps	Goals
1	GK	(Japan)	Yoshiki Maeda	August 29, 1975 (aged 25)	cm / kg	7	0						
2	DF	(Japan)	Koji Arimura	August 25, 1976 (aged 24)	cm / kg	41	3						
3	DF	(Japan)	Kohei Yamamichi	May 11, 1980 (aged 20)	cm / kg	31	0						
4	DF	(Japan)	Rikiya Kawamae	August 20, 1971 (aged 29)	cm / kg	35	2						
5	DF	(Japan)	Yoshinori Matsuda	August 14, 1974 (aged 26)	cm / kg	21	0						
6	DF	(Japan)	Keisuke Mori	April 17, 1980 (aged 20)	cm / kg	13	1						
7	FW	(Japan)	Omi Sato	December 22, 1975 (aged 25)	cm / kg	32	10						
8	MF	(Japan)	Kosei Kitauchi	April 25, 1974 (aged 26)	cm / kg	39	1						
9	FW	(Japan)	Koichiro Katafuchi	April 29, 1975 (aged 25)	cm / kg	7	0						
10	MF	(Japan)	Katsuhiro Suzuki	November 26, 1977 (aged 23)	cm / kg	23	1						
11	DF	(Japan)	Hideaki Tominaga	August 27, 1976 (aged 24)	cm / kg	16	2						
13	DF	(Japan)	Koichi Sekimoto	May 23, 1978 (aged 22)	cm / kg	25	1						
14	MF	(Japan)	Kenta Shimaoka	July 26, 1973 (aged 27)	cm / kg	25	0						
15	MF	(Japan)	Kenji Takagi	May 13, 1976 (aged 24)	cm / kg	37	0						
16	GK	(Japan)	Tetsuharu Yamaguchi	September 8, 1977 (aged 23)	cm / kg	37	0						
17	MF	(Japan)	Koichi Higashi	August 23, 1978 (aged 22)	cm / kg	27	2						
18	FW	(Japan)	Ryo Fukudome	June 26, 1978 (aged 22)	cm / kg	23	1						
19	FW	(Japan)	Goichi Ishitani	July 6, 1979 (aged 21)	cm / kg	8	0						
20	FW	(Japan)	Yoshiyuki Takemoto	October 3, 1973 (aged 27)	cm / kg	10	1						
21	GK	(Japan)	Junnosuke Schneider	May 22, 1977 (aged 23)	cm / kg	0	0						
22	FW	(Japan)	Hiroshi Morita	May 18, 1978 (aged 22)	cm / kg	17	5						
23	FW	(Japan)	Tatsuomi Koishi	August 22, 1977 (aged 23)	cm / kg	19	6						
24	MF	(Japan)	Daisuke Akashi	April 20, 1982 (aged 18)	cm / kg	0	0						
25	MF	(Japan)	Takashi Furukawa	October 28, 1981 (aged 19)	cm / kg	9	0						
26	MF	(Japan)	Jiro Yabe	May 26, 1978 (aged 22)	cm / kg	33	4						
27	DF	(Japan)	Haruhiko Sato	June 27, 1978 (aged 22)	cm / kg	38	3						
28	DF	(Japan)	Daisuke Watanabe	July 26, 1978 (aged 22)	cm / kg	0	0						
29	MF	(Japan)	Shinsuke Shimabukuro	January 13, 1983 (aged 18)	cm / kg	0	0						
30	MF	(Japan)	Kenta Nakamura	October 5, 1978 (aged 22)	cm / kg	0	0						
31	DF	(Japan)	Satoshi Miyagawa	March 24, 1977 (aged 23)	cm / kg	11	0						
32	FW	(Japan)	Michael Yano	January 22, 1979 (aged 22)	cm / kg	20	2						
33	GK	(Japan)	Koji Fujikawa	October 7, 1978 (aged 22)	cm / kg	0	0						

== Other pages ==
- (in Japanese) J. League official site
