= Hashiguchi =

Hashiguchi (written: 橋口 lit. "bridge mouth") is a Japanese surname. Notable people with the surname include:

- Goyō Hashiguchi (橋口 五葉, 1880–1921), Japanese artist
- Jōji Hashiguchi (橋口 譲二, born 1949), Japanese photographer
- Masaru Hashiguchi (橋口 勝, born 1974), Japanese footballer
- Ryōsuke Hashiguchi (橋口 亮輔, born 1962), Japanese film director
- Takashi Hashiguchi (橋口 たかし, born 1967), Japanese manga artist
