= 2004 Sagan Tosu season =

Sagan Tosu
2004 season
- Manager: Ikuo Matsumoto
- Stadium: Tosu Stadium
- J. League 2: 11th
- Emperor's Cup: 4th Round
- Top goalscorer: Yoshiya Takemura (6)
Home colours	Away colours

During the 2004 season, Sagan Tosu competed in the J. League 2, in which they finished 11th.

== Competitions ==
Competitions	Position
J. League 2	11th / 12 clubs
Emperor's Cup	4th Round

== Domestic results ==
=== J. League 2 ===
Match	Date	Venue	Opponents	Score
1	2004..	[[]]	[[]]	-
2	2004..	[[]]	[[]]	-
3	2004..	[[]]	[[]]	-
4	2004..	[[]]	[[]]	-
5	2004..	[[]]	[[]]	-
6	2004..	[[]]	[[]]	-
7	2004..	[[]]	[[]]	-
8	2004..	[[]]	[[]]	-
9	2004..	[[]]	[[]]	-
10	2004..	[[]]	[[]]	-
11	2004..	[[]]	[[]]	-
12	2004..	[[]]	[[]]	-
13	2004..	[[]]	[[]]	-
14	2004..	[[]]	[[]]	-
15	2004..	[[]]	[[]]	-
16	2004..	[[]]	[[]]	-
17	2004..	[[]]	[[]]	-
18	2004..	[[]]	[[]]	-
19	2004..	[[]]	[[]]	-
20	2004..	[[]]	[[]]	-
21	2004..	[[]]	[[]]	-
22	2004..	[[]]	[[]]	-
23	2004..	[[]]	[[]]	-
24	2004..	[[]]	[[]]	-
25	2004..	[[]]	[[]]	-
26	2004..	[[]]	[[]]	-
27	2004..	[[]]	[[]]	-
28	2004..	[[]]	[[]]	-
29	2004..	[[]]	[[]]	-
30	2004..	[[]]	[[]]	-
31	2004..	[[]]	[[]]	-
32	2004..	[[]]	[[]]	-
33	2004..	[[]]	[[]]	-
34	2004..	[[]]	[[]]	-
35	2004..	[[]]	[[]]	-
36	2004..	[[]]	[[]]	-
37	2004..	[[]]	[[]]	-
38	2004..	[[]]	[[]]	-
39	2004..	[[]]	[[]]	-
40	2004..	[[]]	[[]]	-
41	2004..	[[]]	[[]]	-
42	2004..	[[]]	[[]]	-
43	2004..	[[]]	[[]]	-
44	2004..	[[]]	[[]]	-

=== Emperor's Cup ===
Match	Date	Venue	Opponents	Score
3rd Round	2004..	[[]]	[[]]	-
4th Round	2004..	[[]]	[[]]	-

== Player statistics ==
No.	Pos.	Player	D.o.B. (Age)	Height / Weight	J. League 2		Emperor's Cup		Total	
No.	Pos.	Player	D.o.B. (Age)	Height / Weight	Apps	Goals	Apps	Goals	Apps	Goals
1	GK	Yasuhiro Tominaga	May 22, 1980 (aged 23)	cm / kg	18	0				
2	DF	Shin Asahina	August 20, 1976 (aged 27)	cm / kg	35	1				
3	DF	Takuji Miyoshi	August 20, 1978 (aged 25)	cm / kg	6	0				
4	FW	Yūzō Tashiro	July 22, 1982 (aged 21)	cm / kg	10	1				
5	DF	Satoshi Miyagawa	March 24, 1977 (aged 26)	cm / kg	1	0				
6	MF	Hiromasa Suguri	July 29, 1976 (aged 27)	cm / kg	25	1				
7	FW	Omi Sato	December 22, 1975 (aged 28)	cm / kg	26	5				
8	MF	Katsuhiro Suzuki	November 26, 1977 (aged 26)	cm / kg	4	0				
8	DF	Masayuki Ochiai	July 11, 1981 (aged 22)	cm / kg	12	0				
9	FW	Naoki Naruo	October 5, 1974 (aged 29)	cm / kg	10	0				
10	MF	Takumi Motohashi	August 3, 1982 (aged 21)	cm / kg	40	3				
11	FW	Taro Sugahara	June 14, 1981 (aged 22)	cm / kg	8	0				
13	DF	Hidenori Kato	May 13, 1981 (aged 22)	cm / kg	16	0				
14	GK	Junnosuke Schneider	May 24, 1977 (aged 26)	cm / kg	26	0				
15	DF	Keisuke Mori	April 17, 1980 (aged 23)	cm / kg	0	0				
16	DF	Yoshiro Nakamura	October 17, 1979 (aged 24)	cm / kg	38	1				
17	DF	Kohei Yamamichi	May 11, 1980 (aged 23)	cm / kg	33	0				
18	MF	Yoshiya Takemura	December 6, 1973 (aged 30)	cm / kg	41	6				
19	MF	Akira Ito	September 19, 1972 (aged 31)	cm / kg	41	4				
20	FW	Koki Habata	July 22, 1983 (aged 20)	cm / kg	22	4				
21	GK	Koji Fujikawa	October 7, 1978 (aged 25)	cm / kg	1	0				
22	FW	Ryuji Shimoshi	July 24, 1985 (aged 18)	cm / kg	19	0				
23	FW	Tatsuomi Koishi	August 22, 1977 (aged 26)	cm / kg	39	2				
24	DF	Jun Ideguchi	May 14, 1979 (aged 24)	cm / kg	18	0				
25	MF	Takashi Furukawa	October 28, 1981 (aged 22)	cm / kg	0	0				
26	MF	Jiro Yabe	May 26, 1978 (aged 25)	cm / kg	30	2				
27	DF	Haruhiko Sato	June 27, 1978 (aged 25)	cm / kg	36	0				
28	MF	Yoshiki Takahashi	May 14, 1985 (aged 18)	cm / kg	27	1				
29	MF	Shota Koide	September 29, 1981 (aged 22)	cm / kg	15	0				
30	FW	Hiroshi Narazaki	June 1, 1981 (aged 22)	cm / kg	6	0				
33	GK	Yoshimi Sasahara	April 2, 1974 (aged 29)	cm / kg	0	0				

== Other pages ==
- (in Japanese) J. League official site
