= Yoneyama =

Yoneyama (written: 米山) is a Japanese surname. Notable people with the surname include:

- Atsushi Yoneyama (米山 篤志, born 1976), Japanese footballer
- Daisuke Yoneyama (米山 大輔, born 1982), Japanese footballer
- Haruna Yoneyama (米山 知奈, born 1991), Japanese ice hockey player
- Hiroshi Yoneyama (米山 弘, 1908–1988), Japanese swimmer
- Kaori Yoneyama (米山 香織, born 1981), Japanese professional wrestler
- Kazutomo Yoneyama (米山 一朋, born 1961), Japanese volleyball player
- Kunizo Yoneyama (米山 国蔵, 1877–1968), Japanese mathematician
- Minoru Yoneyama (米山 稔, 1924–2019), Japanese businessman
- Ryuichi Yoneyama (米山 隆一, born 1967), Japanese politician
- Satoshi Yoneyama (米山 聡, born 1976), better known as Muhammad Yone, Japanese professional wrestler
- Satoshi Yoneyama (footballer) (米山 智, born 1974), Japanese footballer
- Tsuyoshi Yoneyama (米山 剛, born 1965), Japanese golfer
- Yuta Yoneyama (米山 裕太, born 1984), Japanese volleyball player

== See also ==
- Yoneyama Station, a railway station in Kashiwazaki, Niigata Prefecture, Japan
- Yonex, formerly known as Yoneyama Company
