= Taro Sugahara =

Japanese footballer (born 1981)

Taro Sugahara 菅原 太郎
Personal information
- Full name: Taro Sugahara
- Date of birth: June 14, 1981 (age 45)
- Place of birth: Otsu, Japan
- Height: 1.85 m (6 ft 1 in)
- Position: Forward

Youth career
- 1997–1999: Shizuoka Gakuen High School

Senior career*
Years	Team	Apps	(Gls)
2000	Mirassol		
2001–2002	Kashiwa Reysol	4	(0)
2003	Vissel Kobe	2	(0)
2004	Sagan Tosu	8	(0)
2005	Ehime FC	7	(0)
2006	Zweigen Kanazawa	12	(9)
2007–2008	Grulla Morioka	24	(24)
2009–2010	Blaublitz Akita	52	(5)
2011	Sony Sendai	10	(1)
2012	Hoyo Oita	9	(0)
2013	Blaublitz Akita	24	(2)
2014	Grulla Morioka	11	(1)
Total		163	(42)

Managerial career
- 2020-: J.FC Miyazaki
- * Club domestic league appearances and goals

Taro Sugahara (菅原 太郎, Sugahara Taro; born June 14, 1981) is a former Japanese football player.

== Playing career ==
Sugahara was born in Otsu on June 14, 1981. After graduating from Shizuoka Gakuen High School, he moved to Brazil and joined Mirassol in 2000. In 2001, he returned to Japan and joined J1 League club Kashiwa Reysol. Although he debuted in 2002, he could hardly play in the match. In 2003, he moved to J1 club Vissel Kobe. However he could hardly play in the match. In 2004, he moved to J2 League club Sagan Tosu. However he could hardly play in the match. In 2005, he moved to Japan Football League (JFL) club Ehime FC. Although he could not play many matches, the club won the champions and was promoted to J2 end of 2005 season. In 2006, he moved to Regional Leagues club Zweigen Kanazawa. He played many matches and many goals. In 2007, he moved to Regional Leagues club Grulla Morioka. He played many matches and scored many goals in 2 seasons. In 2009, he moved to JFL club TDK (later Blaublitz Akita). He played many matches in 2 seasons. In 2011, he moved to JFL club Sony Sendai. However he could not play many matches. In 2012, he moved to JFL club Hoyo Oita. However he could not play many matches. In 2013, he moved to JFL club Blaublitz Akita again for the first time in 3 years and played many matches. In 2014, he moved to newly was promoted to J3 League club, Grulla Morioka for the first time in 6 years. He retired end of 2014 season.

== Club statistics ==
Club performance			League		Cup		League Cup		Total	
Season	Club	League	Apps	Goals	Apps	Goals	Apps	Goals	Apps	Goals
Japan			League		Emperor's Cup		J.League Cup		Total	
2001	Kashiwa Reysol	J1 League	0	0	0	0	0	0	0	0
2002	Kashiwa Reysol	J1 League	4	0	0	0	0	0	4	0
2003	Vissel Kobe	J1 League	2	0	0	0	0	0	2	0
2004	Sagan Tosu	J2 League	8	0	0	0	-		8	0
2005	Ehime FC	Football League	7	0	1	0	-		8	0
2006	Zweigen Kanazawa	Regional Leagues	12	9	-		-		12	9
2007	Grulla Morioka	Regional Leagues	10	9	-		-		10	9
2008	Grulla Morioka	Regional Leagues	14	15	2	0	-		16	15
2009	TDK	Football League	25	2	1	0	-		26	2
2010	Blaublitz Akita	Football League	27	3	1	0	-		28	3
2011	Sony Sendai	Football League	10	1	1	0	-		11	1
2012	Hoyo Oita	Football League	9	0	1	0	-		10	0
2013	Blaublitz Akita	Football League	24	2	1	0	-		25	2
2014	Grulla Morioka	J3 League	11	1	0	0	-		11	1
Career total			163	42	8	0	0	0	171	42
