= Katsuhiro Suzuki =

Katsuhiro Suzuki may refer to:

- Katsuhiro Suzuki (footballer)
- Katsuhiro Suzuki (actor)
