= 2000 Kashima Antlers season =

Kashima Antlers
2000 season
- Manager: Toninho Cerezo
- Stadium: Kashima Soccer Stadium
- J.League 1: 1st
- Emperor's Cup: Champions
- J.League Cup: Champions
- Top goalscorer: Tomoyuki Hirase (11)
Home colours	Away colours

2000 Kashima Antlers season

== Competitions ==
Competitions	Position
J.League 1	Champions / 16 clubs
Emperor's Cup	Champions
J.League Cup	Champions

== Domestic results ==
=== J.League 1 ===
11 March 2000 1–1	Kashima Antlers	1–0	Nagoya Grampus Eight	Tokyo National Stadium
JST (UTC+09)

18 March 2000 1–2	Kawasaki Frontale	0–1	Kashima Antlers	Todoroki Athletics Stadium
JST (UTC+09)

25 March 2000 1–3	Avispa Fukuoka	0–1 (GG) (a.e.t.)	Kashima Antlers	Hakatanomori Football Stadium
JST (UTC+09)

1 April 2000 1–4	Kashima Antlers	2–3	Yokohama F. Marinos	Tokyo National Stadium
JST (UTC+09)

5 April 2000 1–5	Shimizu S-Pulse	2–1	Kashima Antlers	Nihondaira Sports Stadium
JST (UTC+09)

8 April 2000 1–6	Kashima Antlers	2–1	F.C. Tokyo	Toyama Athletic Stadium
JST (UTC+09)

15 April 2000 1–7	Cerezo Osaka	2–1	Kashima Antlers	Osaka Nagai Stadium
JST (UTC+09)

22 April 2000 1–8	Kashima Antlers	0–1	JEF United Ichihara	Technoport Fukui Stadium
JST (UTC+09)

29 April 2000 1–9	Vissel Kobe	0–3	Kashima Antlers	Kobe Universiade Memorial Stadium
JST (UTC+09)

3 May 2000 1–10	Kashima Antlers	0–3	Verdy Kawasaki	Kashima Soccer Stadium
JST (UTC+09)

6 May 2000 1–11	Júbilo Iwata	2–3 (GG) (a.e.t.)	Kashima Antlers	Júbilo Iwata Stadium
JST (UTC+09)

13 May 2000 1–12	Kashiwa Reysol	1–2	Kashima Antlers	Kashiwanoha Park Stadium
JST (UTC+09)

17 May 2000 1–13	Kashima Antlers	0–1	Gamba Osaka	Kashima Soccer Stadium
JST (UTC+09)

20 May 2000 1–14	Sanfrecce Hiroshima	1–0	Kashima Antlers	Hiroshima Big Arch
JST (UTC+09)

27 May 2000 1–15	Kashima Antlers	3–0	Kyoto Purple Sanga	Kashima Soccer Stadium
JST (UTC+09)

24 June 2000 2–1	Nagoya Grampus Eight	0–3	Kashima Antlers	Mizuho Athletic Stadium
JST (UTC+09)

1 July 2000 2–2	Kashima Antlers	4–0	Kawasaki Frontale	Kashima Soccer Stadium
JST (UTC+09)

8 July 2000 2–3	Kashima Antlers	2–1	Júbilo Iwata	Kashima Soccer Stadium
JST (UTC+09)

15 July 2000 2–4	Verdy Kawasaki	0–2	Kashima Antlers	Tokyo National Stadium
JST (UTC+09)

22 July 2000 2–5	Kashima Antlers	3–0	Vissel Kobe	Kashima Soccer Stadium
JST (UTC+09)

26 July 2000 2–6	JEF United Ichihara	1–2	Kashima Antlers	Ichihara Seaside Stadium
JST (UTC+09)

29 July 2000 2–7	Kashima Antlers	0–1 (GG) (a.e.t.)	Cerezo Osaka	Kashima Soccer Stadium
JST (UTC+09)

5 August 2000 2–8	Yokohama F. Marinos	1–1 (GG) (a.e.t.)	Kashima Antlers	Tokyo National Stadium
JST (UTC+09)

12 August 2000 2–9	Kashima Antlers	1–1 (GG) (a.e.t.)	Avispa Fukuoka	Kashima Soccer Stadium
JST (UTC+09)

19 August 2000 2–10	F.C. Tokyo	1–1 (GG) (a.e.t.)	Kashima Antlers	Tokyo National Stadium
JST (UTC+09)

8 November 2000 2–11	Kashima Antlers	2–1	Shimizu S-Pulse	Tokyo National Stadium
JST (UTC+09)

11 November 2000 2–12	Kyoto Purple Sanga	1–3	Kashima Antlers	Nishikyogoku Athletic Stadium
JST (UTC+09)

18 November 2000 2–13	Kashima Antlers	2–1 (GG) (a.e.t.)	Sanfrecce Hiroshima	Tottori Soccer Stadium
JST (UTC+09)

23 November 2000 2–14	Gamba Osaka	1–2	Kashima Antlers	Osaka Expo '70 Stadium
JST (UTC+09)

26 November 2000 2–15	Kashima Antlers	0–0 (GG) (a.e.t.)	Kashiwa Reysol	Tokyo National Stadium
JST (UTC+09)

=== Emperor's Cup ===
1st Round	bye

2nd Round	bye

13 December 2000 3rd Round	Kashima Antlers	2–1	Sagan Tosu	Hitachinaka City Stadium
JST (UTC+09)

17 December 2000 4th Round	Verdy Kawasaki	0–2	Kashima Antlers	Tosu Stadium
JST (UTC+09)

23 December 2000 Quarterfinals	Yokohama F. Marinos	1–1 (GG) (a.e.t.) (1–4 p)	Kashima Antlers	Tottori Soccer Stadium
JST (UTC+09)

29 December 2000 Semifinals	Kashima Antlers	3–2 (GG) (a.e.t.)	Gamba Osaka	International Stadium Yokohama
JST (UTC+09)

1 January 2001 Final	Kashima Antlers	3–2 (GG) (a.e.t.)	Shimizu S-Pulse	Tokyo National Stadium
JST (UTC+09)

=== J.League Cup ===
1st Round	bye

5 July 2000 2nd Round-1	Avispa Fukuoka	1–1	Kashima Antlers	Hakatanomori Football Stadium
JST (UTC+09)

12 July 2000 2nd Round-2	Kashima Antlers	3–2 (GG) (a.e.t.) (4–3 agg.)	Avispa Fukuoka	Kashima Soccer Stadium
JST (UTC+09)

30 August 2000 Quarterfinals-1	Yokohama F. Marinos	1–2	Kashima Antlers	Yamagata Park Stadium
JST (UTC+09)

6 September 2000 Quarterfinals-2	Kashima Antlers	1–1 (3–2 agg.)	Yokohama F. Marinos	Kashima Soccer Stadium
JST (UTC+09)

11 October 2000 Semifinals-1	Nagoya Grampus Eight	1–3	Kashima Antlers	Mizuho Rugby Stadium
JST (UTC+09)

18 October 2000 Semifinals-2	Kashima Antlers	3–2 (6–3 agg.)	Nagoya Grampus Eight	Sendai Stadium
JST (UTC+09)

4 November 2000 Final	Kawasaki Frontale	0–2	Kashima Antlers	Tokyo National Stadium
JST (UTC+09)		J.League

== Player statistics ==
No.	Pos.	Nat.	Player	D.o.B. (Age)	Height / Weight	J.League 1		Emperor's Cup		J.League Cup		Total	
No.	Pos.	Nat.	Player	D.o.B. (Age)	Height / Weight	Apps	Goals	Apps	Goals	Apps	Goals	Apps	Goals
1	GK	(Japan)	Masaaki Furukawa	August 28, 1968 (aged 31)	cm / kg	0	0						
2	DF	(Japan)	Akira Narahashi	November 26, 1971 (aged 28)	cm / kg	26	3						
3	DF	(Japan)	Yutaka Akita	August 6, 1970 (aged 29)	cm / kg	28	1						
4	DF	(Brazil)	Fabiano	August 4, 1975 (aged 24)	cm / kg	28	2						
5	MF	(Japan)	Kōji Nakata	July 9, 1979 (aged 20)	cm / kg	29	4						
6	MF	(Japan)	Yasuto Honda	June 25, 1969 (aged 30)	cm / kg	29	0						
7	DF	(Japan)	Naoki Soma	July 19, 1971 (aged 28)	cm / kg	30	2						
8	FW	(Brazil)	Bebeto	February 16, 1964 (aged 36)	cm / kg	8	1						
9	FW	(Japan)	Tomoyuki Hirase	May 23, 1977 (aged 22)	cm / kg	26	11						
10	MF	(Brazil)	Bismarck	September 17, 1969 (aged 30)	cm / kg	26	3						
11	FW	(Japan)	Yoshiyuki Hasegawa	February 11, 1969 (aged 31)	cm / kg	8	1						
13	FW	(Japan)	Atsushi Yanagisawa	May 27, 1977 (aged 22)	cm / kg	26	6						
14	MF	(Japan)	Tadatoshi Masuda	December 25, 1973 (aged 26)	cm / kg	14	0						
15	DF	(Japan)	Seiji Kaneko	May 27, 1980 (aged 19)	cm / kg	10	0						
16	MF	(Japan)	Masashi Motoyama	June 20, 1979 (aged 20)	cm / kg	18	6						
17	MF	(Japan)	Mitsuo Ogasawara	April 5, 1979 (aged 20)	cm / kg	28	3						
18	MF	(Japan)	Koji Kumagai	October 23, 1975 (aged 24)	cm / kg	24	1						
19	DF	(Japan)	Yoshiro Nakamura	October 17, 1979 (aged 20)	cm / kg	2	0						
20	FW	(Japan)	Jo Nakajima	July 3, 1980 (aged 19)	cm / kg	0	0						
21	GK	(Japan)	Daijiro Takakuwa	August 10, 1973 (aged 26)	cm / kg	30	0						
22	DF	(Japan)	Ryuta Matsushima	November 12, 1980 (aged 19)	cm / kg	0	0						
23	DF	(Japan)	Jun Uchida	October 14, 1977 (aged 22)	cm / kg	8	0						
24	DF	(Japan)	Kenji Haneda	December 1, 1981 (aged 18)	cm / kg	3	0						
25	MF	(Japan)	Takuya Nozawa	August 12, 1981 (aged 18)	cm / kg	0	0						
26	DF	(Japan)	Yuichi Nemoto	July 21, 1981 (aged 18)	cm / kg	0	0						
27	FW	(Japan)	Kosei Nakamura	April 5, 1981 (aged 18)	cm / kg	1	0						
28	GK	(Japan)	Hitoshi Sogahata	August 2, 1979 (aged 20)	cm / kg	2	0						
29	GK	(Japan)	Shinya Kato	September 19, 1980 (aged 19)	cm / kg	0	0						
30	FW	(Japan)	Takayuki Suzuki	June 5, 1976 (aged 23)	cm / kg	5	2						
