= Ideguchi =

Ideguchi (written: 井手口) is a Japanese surname. Notable people with the surname include:

- Jun Ideguchi (井手口 純, born 1979), Japanese footballer
- Masaaki Ideguchi (井手口 正昭, born 1988), Japanese footballer
- Yosuke Ideguchi (井手口 陽介, born 1996), Japanese footballer
