= Koji Fujikawa =

Japanese footballer

Koji Fujikawa 藤川 康司
Personal information
- Full name: Koji Fujikawa
- Date of birth: October 7, 1978 (age 48)
- Place of birth: Tokushima, Japan
- Height: 1.80 m (5 ft 11 in)
- Position: Goalkeeper

Youth career
- 1994–1996: Seiko Gakuen High School
- 1998–2000: Nippon Bunri University

Senior career*
Years	Team	Apps	(Gls)
1997	Kyoto Purple Sanga	0	(0)
2000	Oita Trinita	0	(0)
2001–2004	Sagan Tosu	25	(0)
2005–2009	Kataller Toyama	78	(0)
Total		103	(0)
- * Club domestic league appearances and goals

Koji Fujikawa (藤川 康司, Fujikawa Koji; born October 7, 1978) is a former Japanese football player.

== Playing career ==
Fujikawa was born in Tokushima Prefecture on October 7, 1978. After graduating from high school, he joined J1 League club Kyoto Purple Sanga in 1997. However he could not play at all in the match. He left the club end of 1997 season and he entered Nippon Bunri University in 1998. In October 2000, he joined J2 League club Oita Trinita. In 2001, he moved to Sagan Tosu. On July 10, 2002, he debuted in J2 League against Ventforet Kofu. In 2003, he battled with Norio Takahashi and Junnosuke Schneider for the position and played many matches. However he could hardly play in the match in 2004. In 2005, he moved to Japan Football League club ALO'S Hokuriku (later Kataller Toyama). He played many matches as regular goalkeeper until 2007. However he could not play at all in the match behind Yuji Nakagawa from 2008 and retired end of 2009 season.

== Club statistics ==
Club performance			League		Cup		League Cup		Total	
Season	Club	League	Apps	Goals	Apps	Goals	Apps	Goals	Apps	Goals
Japan			League		Emperor's Cup		J.League Cup		Total	
1997	Kyoto Purple Sanga	J1 League	0	0	0	0	0	0	0	0
2000	Oita Trinita	J2 League	0	0	0	0	0	0	0	0
2001	Sagan Tosu	J2 League	0	0	0	0	0	0	0	0
2002	Sagan Tosu	J2 League	2	0	0	0	-		2	0
2003	Sagan Tosu	J2 League	22	0	1	0	-		23	0
2004	Sagan Tosu	J2 League	1	0	0	0	-		1	0
2005	ALO'S Hokuriku	Football League	30	0	4	0	-		34	0
2006	ALO'S Hokuriku	Football League	20	0	-		-		20	0
2007	ALO'S Hokuriku	Football League	28	0	2	0	-		30	0
2008	Kataller Toyama	Football League	0	0	0	0	-		0	0
2009	Kataller Toyama	J2 League	0	0	0	0	-		0	0
Career total			103	0	7	0	0	0	110	0
