= 2000 Avispa Fukuoka season =

Avispa Fukuoka
2000 season
- Manager: Piccoli
- Stadium: Hakatanomori Football Stadium
- J.League 1: 12th
- Emperor's Cup: 4th Round
- J.League Cup: 2nd Round
- Top goalscorer: Montoya (9)
Home colours	Away colours

2000 Avispa Fukuoka season

== Competitions ==
Competitions	Position
J.League 1	12th / 16 clubs
Emperor's Cup	4th round
J.League Cup	2nd round

== Domestic results ==
=== J.League 1 ===
11 March 2000 1-1	Avispa Fukuoka	2-1	Kawasaki Frontale	Hakatanomori Football Stadium
JST (UTC+09)

18 March 2000 1-2	FC Tokyo	2-0	Avispa Fukuoka	Tokyo National Stadium
JST (UTC+09)

25 March 2000 1-3	Avispa Fukuoka	0-1 (GG) (a.e.t.)	Kashima Antlers	Hakatanomori Football Stadium
JST (UTC+09)

1 April 2000 1-4	Nagoya Grampus Eight	1-2 (GG) (a.e.t.)	Avispa Fukuoka	Mizuho Rugby Stadium
JST (UTC+09)

5 April 2000 1-5	Avispa Fukuoka	0-2	Verdy Kawasaki	Hakatanomori Football Stadium
JST (UTC+09)

8 April 2000 1-6	Júbilo Iwata	2-1	Avispa Fukuoka	Júbilo Iwata Stadium
JST (UTC+09)

15 April 2000 1-7	Avispa Fukuoka	2-0	Kashiwa Reysol	Hakatanomori Football Stadium
JST (UTC+09)

22 April 2000 1-8	Gamba Osaka	4-0	Avispa Fukuoka	Osaka Expo '70 Stadium
JST (UTC+09)

29 April 2000 1-9	Avispa Fukuoka	1-0 (GG) (a.e.t.)	Sanfrecce Hiroshima	Hakatanomori Football Stadium
JST (UTC+09)

3 May 2000 1-10	Kyoto Purple Sanga	3-4 (GG) (a.e.t.)	Avispa Fukuoka	Nishikyogoku Athletic Stadium
JST (UTC+09)

6 May 2000 1-11	Avispa Fukuoka	3-0	Shimizu S-Pulse	Hakatanomori Football Stadium
JST (UTC+09)

13 May 2000 1-12	Avispa Fukuoka	2-4	Yokohama F. Marinos	Hakatanomori Football Stadium
JST (UTC+09)

17 May 2000 1-13	Cerezo Osaka	4-2	Avispa Fukuoka	Osaka Nagai Stadium
JST (UTC+09)

20 May 2000 1-14	Avispa Fukuoka	0-3	JEF United Ichihara	Hakatanomori Football Stadium
JST (UTC+09)

27 May 2000 1-15	Vissel Kobe	1-0	Avispa Fukuoka	Kobe Universiade Memorial Stadium
JST (UTC+09)

24 June 2000 2-1	Kawasaki Frontale	0-1	Avispa Fukuoka	Todoroki Athletics Stadium
JST (UTC+09)

1 July 2000 2-2	Avispa Fukuoka	1-2 (GG) (a.e.t.)	FC Tokyo	Hakatanomori Football Stadium
JST (UTC+09)

8 July 2000 2-3	Shimizu S-Pulse	0-1	Avispa Fukuoka	Nihondaira Sports Stadium
JST (UTC+09)

15 July 2000 2-4	Avispa Fukuoka	2-3 (GG) (a.e.t.)	Kyoto Purple Sanga	Hakatanomori Football Stadium
JST (UTC+09)

22 July 2000 2-5	Sanfrecce Hiroshima	1-2	Avispa Fukuoka	Hiroshima Big Arch
JST (UTC+09)

26 July 2000 2-6	Avispa Fukuoka	2-1	Gamba Osaka	Hakatanomori Football Stadium
JST (UTC+09)

29 July 2000 2-7	Kashiwa Reysol	1-0	Avispa Fukuoka	Hitachi Kashiwa Soccer Stadium
JST (UTC+09)

5 August 2000 2-8	Avispa Fukuoka	3-2 (GG) (a.e.t.)	Nagoya Grampus Eight	Hakatanomori Football Stadium
JST (UTC+09)

12 August 2000 2-9	Kashima Antlers	1-1 (GG) (a.e.t.)	Avispa Fukuoka	Kashima Soccer Stadium
JST (UTC+09)

19 August 2000 2-10	Avispa Fukuoka	2-1	Júbilo Iwata	Hakatanomori Football Stadium
JST (UTC+09)

8 November 2000 2-11	Verdy Kawasaki	0-0 (GG) (a.e.t.)	Avispa Fukuoka	Todoroki Athletics Stadium
JST (UTC+09)

11 November 2000 2-12	Avispa Fukuoka	3-1	Vissel Kobe	Hakatanomori Football Stadium
JST (UTC+09)

18 November 2000 2-13	JEF United Ichihara	4-3 (GG) (a.e.t.)	Avispa Fukuoka	Ichihara Seaside Stadium
JST (UTC+09)

23 November 2000 2-14	Avispa Fukuoka	0-1	Cerezo Osaka	Hakatanomori Football Stadium
JST (UTC+09)

26 November 2000 2-15	Yokohama F. Marinos	2-1 (GG) (a.e.t.)	Avispa Fukuoka	International Stadium Yokohama
JST (UTC+09)

=== Emperor's Cup ===
1st Round	bye

2nd Round	bye

10 December 2000 3rd Round	Avispa Fukuoka	4-2	Omiya Ardija	Hakatanomori Football Stadium
JST (UTC+09)

17 December 2000 4th Round	Shimizu S-Pulse	1-0	Avispa Fukuoka	Nihondaira Sports Stadium
JST (UTC+09)

=== J.League Cup ===
12 April 2000 1st Round-1	Shonan Bellmare	2-3	Avispa Fukuoka	Hiratsuka Athletics Stadium
JST (UTC+09)

19 April 2000 1st Round-2	Avispa Fukuoka	0-0 (3-2 agg.)	Shonan Bellmare	Hakatanomori Football Stadium
JST (UTC+09)

5 July 2000 2nd Round-1	Avispa Fukuoka	1-1	Kashima Antlers	Hakatanomori Football Stadium
JST (UTC+09)

12 July 2000 2nd Round-2	Kashima Antlers	3-2 (GG) (a.e.t.) (4-3 agg.)	Avispa Fukuoka	Kashima Soccer Stadium
JST (UTC+09)

== Player statistics ==
No.	Pos.	Nat.	Player	D.o.B. (Age)	Height / Weight	J.League 1		Emperor's Cup		J.League Cup		Total	
No.	Pos.	Nat.	Player	D.o.B. (Age)	Height / Weight	Apps	Goals	Apps	Goals	Apps	Goals	Apps	Goals
1	GK	(Japan)	Hideki Tsukamoto	August 9, 1973 (aged 26)	cm / kg	0	0						
2	DF	(Japan)	Shinichi Kawaguchi	June 13, 1977 (aged 22)	cm / kg	15	0						
3	DF	(Japan)	Masafumi Mizuki	August 1, 1974 (aged 25)	cm / kg	0	0						
4	DF	(Japan)	Mitsuaki Kojima	July 14, 1968 (aged 31)	cm / kg	27	0						
5	DF	(Japan)	Yasutoshi Miura	July 15, 1965 (aged 34)	cm / kg	25	1						
6	MF	(Japan)	Yoshiyuki Shinoda	June 18, 1971 (aged 28)	cm / kg	13	0						
7	MF	(Japan)	Satoru Noda	March 19, 1969 (aged 30)	cm / kg	29	2						
8	MF	(Japan)	Kiyotaka Ishimaru	October 30, 1973 (aged 26)	cm / kg	24	0						
9	FW	(Argentina)	Montoya	October 3, 1976 (aged 23)	cm / kg	28	9						
10	MF	(Japan)	Daisuke Nakaharai	May 22, 1977 (aged 22)	cm / kg	22	4						
11	MF	(Romania)	Pavel Badea	June 10, 1967 (aged 32)	cm / kg	24	2						
12	DF	(Japan)	Yoshitaka Fujisaki	May 16, 1975 (aged 24)	cm / kg	22	0						
13	MF	(Japan)	Takeshi Ushibana	September 21, 1977 (aged 22)	cm / kg	2	0						
14	FW	(Japan)	Yoshiteru Yamashita	November 21, 1977 (aged 22)	cm / kg	8	3						
15	DF	(Japan)	Masaru Hashiguchi	May 21, 1974 (aged 25)	cm / kg	0	0						
16	GK	(Japan)	Koichi Ae	April 15, 1976 (aged 23)	cm / kg	0	0						
16	GK	(Japan)	Yushi Ozaki	March 24, 1969 (aged 30)	cm / kg	0	0						
18	FW	(Japan)	Tomoji Eguchi	April 22, 1977 (aged 22)	cm / kg	23	2						
19	MF	(Japan)	Daisuke Nitta	May 11, 1980 (aged 19)	cm / kg	0	0						
20	MF	(Japan)	Katsuhiro Suzuki	November 26, 1977 (aged 22)	cm / kg	2	0						
21	GK	(Japan)	Takashi Takusagawa	February 12, 1981 (aged 19)	cm / kg	0	0						
22	MF	(Japan)	Norita Ochiai	September 2, 1980 (aged 19)	cm / kg	0	0						
23	DF	(Japan)	Takahiro Inoue	August 16, 1980 (aged 19)	cm / kg	0	0						
24	MF	(Japan)	Tatsunori Hisanaga	December 23, 1977 (aged 22)	cm / kg	27	4						
25	FW	(Japan)	Daiki Fukagawa	August 29, 1980 (aged 19)	cm / kg	0	0						
26	DF	(Argentina)	Flavio Zandoná	April 8, 1967 (aged 32)	cm / kg	0	0						
26	DF	(Japan)	Koji Maeda	February 3, 1969 (aged 31)	cm / kg	21	2						
27	FW	(Japan)	Kazuyoshi Matsunaga	November 13, 1977 (aged 22)	cm / kg	3	2						
28	DF	(Japan)	Takuji Miyoshi	August 20, 1978 (aged 21)	cm / kg	6	0						
29	FW	(Japan)	Michiaki Kakimoto	October 6, 1977 (aged 22)	cm / kg	0	0						
30	GK	(Japan)	Nobuyuki Kojima	January 17, 1966 (aged 34)	cm / kg	30	0						
31	DF	(Japan)	Takashi Maeda	August 1, 1981 (aged 18)	cm / kg	0	0						
32	DF	(Japan)	Shuji Hara	September 29, 1981 (aged 18)	cm / kg	0	0						
33	DF	(Japan)	Toshikazu Kato	May 28, 1981 (aged 18)	cm / kg	0	0						
34	MF	(Japan)	Tomoaki Komorida	July 10, 1981 (aged 18)	cm / kg	0	0						
35	MF	(Japan)	Kentaro Yano	September 22, 1981 (aged 18)	cm / kg	0	0						
36	MF	(Japan)	Masashi Uramoto	October 11, 1981 (aged 18)	cm / kg	0	0						
37	MF	(Japan)	Shinya Shirakawa	August 7, 1981 (aged 18)	cm / kg	0	0						
38	MF	(Japan)	Hiroyuki Ishida	December 11, 1981 (aged 18)	cm / kg	0	0						
39	DF	(Japan)	Takashi Hirajima	February 3, 1982 (aged 18)	cm / kg	23	2						
40	MF	(Japan)	Yoshifumi Yamada	November 4, 1981 (aged 18)	cm / kg	0	0						
41	DF	(Japan)	Tomokazu Kuwano	September 29, 1977 (aged 22)	cm / kg	0	0						
42	FW	(Japan)	Hiroki Hattori	August 30, 1971 (aged 28)	cm / kg	12	2						
43	MF	(Argentina)	David Bisconti	September 22, 1968 (aged 31)	cm / kg	12	6						
