= Satoshi Miyagawa =

Japanese footballer

Satoshi Miyagawa 宮川 悟
Personal information
- Full name: Satoshi Miyagawa
- Date of birth: March 24, 1977 (age 49)
- Place of birth: Yokohama, Japan
- Height: 1.78 m (5 ft 10 in)
- Position: Defender

Senior career*
Years	Team	Apps	(Gls)
2001–2004	Sagan Tosu	55	(4)
Total		55	(4)
- * Club domestic league appearances and goals

Satoshi Miyagawa (宮川 悟, Miyagawa Satoshi; born March 24, 1977) is a former Japanese football player.

== Playing career ==
Miyagawa was born in Yokohama on March 24, 1977. He joined J2 League club Sagan Tosu in 2001. He played many matches as center back and became a regular player in July 2002. In 2003 season, although he could hardly play in the match until summer, he became a regular player in July again. However he could hardly play in the match in 2004 and retired at the end of the 2004 season.

== Career statistics ==
Appearances and goals by club, season and competition
Club	Season	League			Emperor's Cup		J.League Cup		Total	
Club	Season	Division	Apps	Goals	Apps	Goals	Apps	Goals	Apps	Goals
Sagan Tosu	2001	J2 League	11	0	0	0	0	0	11	0
Sagan Tosu	2002	J2 League	22	1	1	0	—		23	1
Sagan Tosu	2003	J2 League	21	3	1	0	—		22	3
Sagan Tosu	2004	J2 League	1	0	0	0	—		1	0
Career total			55	4	2	0	0	0	57	4
