= Yoshiro Nakamura =

Japanese footballer

Yoshiro Nakamura 中村 祥朗
Personal information
- Full name: Yoshiro Nakamura
- Date of birth: October 17, 1979 (age 47)
- Place of birth: Tokyo, Japan
- Height: 1.76 m (5 ft 9 1/2 in)
- Position: Defender

Youth career
- 1995–1997: Nara Ikuei High School

Senior career*
Years	Team	Apps	(Gls)
1998–2001	Kashima Antlers	13	(0)
2001	Oita Trinita	14	(0)
2002	Sanfrecce Hiroshima	4	(0)
2003–2004	Sagan Tosu	60	(1)
2005–2007	Ain Foods	27	(3)
2008–2010	Nara Club	12	(3)
Total		130	(7)
Medal record
Kashima Antlers
Winner	J1 League	1998
Winner	J1 League	2000
Winner	J1 League	2001
Winner	J.League Cup	2000
Runner-up	J.League Cup	1999
Winner	Emperor's Cup	2000
- * Club domestic league appearances and goals

Yoshiro Nakamura (中村 祥朗, Nakamura Yoshirō; born October 17, 1979) is a former Japanese football player.

== Playing career ==
Nakamura was born in Tokyo on October 17, 1979. After graduating from high school, he joined J1 League club Kashima Antlers in 1998. Although he played several matches as left side back every season, he could not play many matches behind Naoki Soma. In early 2001, he played many matches as regular player because Soma got hurt in December 2000. However the club gained Augusto and he moved to J2 League club Oita Trinita in August 2001. At Trinita, he played as regular player. In 2002, he moved to J1 club Sanfrecce Hiroshima. However he could hardly play in the match. In 2003, he moved to J2 club Sagan Tosu. He played as regular player in 2 seasons. In 2005, he moved to Regional Leagues club Ain Foods. In 2008, he moved to Prefectural Leagues club Nara Club. The club was promoted to Regional Leagues from 2009. He retired at the end of the 2010 season.

== Career statistics ==
Appearances and goals by club, season and competition
Club	Season	League			Emperor's Cup		J.League Cup		Total	
Club	Season	Division	Apps	Goals	Apps	Goals	Apps	Goals	Apps	Goals
Kashima Antlers	1998	J1 League	0	0	0	0	3	1	3	1
Kashima Antlers	1999	J1 League	2	0	0	0	0	0	2	0
Kashima Antlers	2000	J1 League	2	0	0	0	2	0	4	0
Kashima Antlers	2001	J1 League	9	0	0	0	2	0	11	0
Oita Trinita	2001	J2 League	14	0	0	0	0	0	14	0
Sanfrecce Hiroshima	2002	J1 League	4	0	0	0	6	0	10	0
Sagan Tosu	2003	J2 League	22	0	1	0	—		23	0
Sagan Tosu	2004	J2 League	38	1	1	0	—		39	1
Ain Foods	2005	Regional Leagues	12	1	3	0	—		15	1
Ain Foods	2006	Regional Leagues	5	0	—		—		5	0
Ain Foods	2007	Regional Leagues	10	2	—		—		10	2
Nara Club	2008	Prefectural Leagues	5	1	—		—		5	1
Nara Club	2009	Regional Leagues	6	2	2	0	—		8	2
Nara Club	2010	Regional Leagues	1	0	1	0	—		2	0
Career total			130	7	8	0	13	1	151	8
