= Eduardo Bustos Montoya =

Argentine footballer (born 1976)

Personal information
- Full name: Eduardo Ariel Bustos Montoya
- Date of birth: October 3, 1976 (age 50)
- Place of birth: Rosario, Argentina
- Height: 1.83 m (6 ft 0 in)
- Position: Forward

Senior career*
Years	Team	Apps	(Gls)
1995–1998	Rosario Central	63	(13)
1997	→Feyenoord (loan)	12	(1)
1999–2001	Atlas	34	(9)
2000	→Avispa Fukuoka (loan)	28	(9)
2000–2001	→12 Octubre (loan)	37	(5)
2002	Chacarita Juniors	17	(6)
2002–2003	Lanús	38	(13)
2003–2004	Banfield	37	(12)
2004–2006	Independiente	33	(8)
2006–2007	Quilmes	24	(3)
2007–2009	Levadiakos	34	(10)
2009–2010	Temperley	29	(3)
2010–2011	Central Córdoba		
- * Club domestic league appearances and goals as of 24 May 2008

Eduardo Ariel Bustos Montoya (born October 3, 1976, in Rosario) is a former Argentine football striker.

== Club career ==
He has previously played for a number of clubs in Argentina, most notably Rosario Central where he was part of the squad that won the Copa CONMEBOL in 1995.

Nicknamed Tati, Bustos Montoya has played for a number of clubs outside Argentina, including Feyenoord in the Netherlands, Atlas of Mexico, Avispa Fukuoka of Japan, 12 de Octubre of Paraguay and Levadiakos of Greece.

== Club statistics ==
Club performance			League		Cup		League Cup		Total	
Season	Club	League	Apps	Goals	Apps	Goals	Apps	Goals	Apps	Goals
Japan			League		Emperor's Cup		J.League Cup		Total	
2000	Avispa Fukuoka	J1 League	28	9	2	0	3	0	33	9
Total			28	9	2	0	3	0	33	9
