= Keisuke Mori =

Japanese footballer

Keisuke Mori 森 惠佑
Personal information
- Full name: Keisuke Mori
- Date of birth: April 17, 1980 (age 46)
- Place of birth: Takeo, Saga, Japan
- Height: 1.74 m (5 ft 8 1/2 in)
- Position: Defender

Youth career
- 1996–1998: Kagoshima Jitsugyo High School

Senior career*
Years	Team	Apps	(Gls)
1999–2004	Sagan Tosu	51	(3)
2004	ALO's Hokuriku	3	(0)
2006	Mito HollyHock	12	(0)
Total		66	(3)
- * Club domestic league appearances and goals

Keisuke Mori (森 惠佑, Mori Keisuke; born April 17, 1980) is a former Japanese football player.

== Playing career ==
Mori was born in Takeo on April 17, 1980. After graduating from high school, he joined newly was promoted to J2 League club, Sagan Tosu based in his local in 1999. On April 14, he debuted against Cerezo Osaka in J.League Cup. His opportunity to play gradually increased from 2000. However he could not play at all in the match in 2004. In September, he moved to Japan Football League club ALO's Hokuriku. However he could not play many matches. After 1 year blank, he joined J2 club Mito HollyHock in 2006. However he could not play many matches and retired end of 2006 season.

== Career statistics ==
Appearances and goals by club, season and competition
Club	Season	League			Emperor's Cup		J.League Cup		Total	
Club	Season	Division	Apps	Goals	Apps	Goals	Apps	Goals	Apps	Goals
Sagan Tosu	1999	J2 League	0	0	0	0	1	0	1	0
Sagan Tosu	2000	J2 League	6	0	0	0	0	0	6	0
Sagan Tosu	2001	J2 League	13	1	2	0	1	0	16	1
Sagan Tosu	2002	J2 League	15	0	0	0	—		15	0
Sagan Tosu	2003	J2 League	17	2	0	0	—		17	2
Sagan Tosu	2004	J2 League	0	0	0	0	—		0	0
ALO's Hokuriku	2004	Football League	3	0			—		3	0
Mito HollyHock	2006	J2 League	12	0			—		12	0
Career total			66	3	2	0	2	0	70	3
