= 2011 Yokohama FC season =

Yokohama FC
2011 season
- Manager: Yasuyuki Kishino
- Stadium: NHK Spring Mitsuzawa Football Stadium
- J2 League: 18 th

2011 Yokohama FC season.

== J2 League ==
Match	Date	Team	Score	Team	Venue	Attendance
1	2011.03.06	Yokohama FC	1-2	Kataller Toyama	NHK Spring Mitsuzawa Football Stadium	11,306
8	2011.04.23	Yokohama FC	1-3	Sagan Tosu	NHK Spring Mitsuzawa Football Stadium	3,783
9	2011.04.30	Shonan Bellmare	0-1	Yokohama FC	Hiratsuka Stadium	10,425
10	2011.05.04	Yokohama FC	0-1	Gainare Tottori	NHK Spring Mitsuzawa Football Stadium	5,464
11	2011.05.08	Tochigi SC	2-1	Yokohama FC	Tochigi Green Stadium	6,105
12	2011.05.14	Yokohama FC	1-1	FC Gifu	NHK Spring Mitsuzawa Football Stadium	3,174
13	2011.05.21	Fagiano Okayama	1-0	Yokohama FC	Kanko Stadium	9,374
14	2011.05.28	Yokohama FC	1-2	Roasso Kumamoto	NHK Spring Mitsuzawa Football Stadium	1,853
15	2011.06.04	Yokohama FC	2-1	Tokyo Verdy	NHK Spring Mitsuzawa Football Stadium	4,442
16	2011.06.12	Consadole Sapporo	0-2	Yokohama FC	Muroran Irie Stadium	7,330
17	2011.06.19	Yokohama FC	1-1	JEF United Chiba	NHK Spring Mitsuzawa Football Stadium	7,012
18	2011.06.26	Kyoto Sanga FC	1-1	Yokohama FC	Kyoto Nishikyogoku Athletic Stadium	8,075
2	2011.06.29	Oita Trinita	1-0	Yokohama FC	Oita Bank Dome	5,384
19	2011.07.02	Yokohama FC	0-1	Tokushima Vortis	NHK Spring Mitsuzawa Football Stadium	3,048
20	2011.07.09	Mito HollyHock	0-1	Yokohama FC	K's denki Stadium Mito	4,719
21	2011.07.17	Yokohama FC	2-2	Oita Trinita	NHK Spring Mitsuzawa Football Stadium	4,770
22	2011.07.24	Yokohama FC	1-2	Giravanz Kitakyushu	NHK Spring Mitsuzawa Football Stadium	8,828
23	2011.07.31	JEF United Chiba	1-1	Yokohama FC	Fukuda Denshi Arena	13,602
3	2011.08.07	Yokohama FC	1-0	Mito HollyHock	NHK Spring Mitsuzawa Football Stadium	3,934
24	2011.08.13	Yokohama FC	2-0	Tochigi SC	NHK Spring Mitsuzawa Football Stadium	5,012
25	2011.08.21	Gainare Tottori	0-1	Yokohama FC	Tottori Bank Bird Stadium	8,212
26	2011.08.27	Yokohama FC	2-0	Thespa Kusatsu	NHK Spring Mitsuzawa Football Stadium	4,230
4	2011.09.03	Giravanz Kitakyushu	2-2	Yokohama FC	Honjo Stadium	5,012
27	2011.09.11	Yokohama FC	0-1	Ehime FC	Nishigaoka Soccer Stadium	2,731
28	2011.09.18	Tokyo Verdy	7-2	Yokohama FC	Tokyo National Stadium	9,958
29	2011.09.25	FC Tokyo	3-0	Yokohama FC	Tokyo National Stadium	21,330
5	2011.09.28	Ehime FC	0-0	Yokohama FC	Ningineer Stadium	2,168
30	2011.10.02	Yokohama FC	1-2	Consadole Sapporo	Tokyo National Stadium	16,813
31	2011.10.15	FC Gifu	4-3	Yokohama FC	Gifu Nagaragawa Stadium	5,236
6	2011.10.19	Yokohama FC	0-1	FC Tokyo	NHK Spring Mitsuzawa Football Stadium	6,230
32	2011.10.23	Tokushima Vortis	4-1	Yokohama FC	Pocarisweat Stadium	7,358
7	2011.10.26	Thespa Kusatsu	1-1	Yokohama FC	Shoda Shoyu Stadium Gunma	2,064
33	2011.10.30	Yokohama FC	0-1	Fagiano Okayama	NHK Spring Mitsuzawa Football Stadium	4,270
34	2011.11.06	Sagan Tosu	2-0	Yokohama FC	Best Amenity Stadium	11,372
35	2011.11.13	Yokohama FC	3-2	Shonan Bellmare	NHK Spring Mitsuzawa Football Stadium	7,382
36	2011.11.20	Roasso Kumamoto	0-1	Yokohama FC	Roasso Kumamoto	7,752
37	2011.11.27	Yokohama FC	1-2	Kyoto Sanga FC	NHK Spring Mitsuzawa Football Stadium	5,350
38	2011.12.03	Kataller Toyama	0-2	Yokohama FC	Kataller Toyama	4,493
