= Omi Sato =

Japanese footballer

Omi Sato 佐藤 大実
Personal information
- Full name: Omi Sato
- Date of birth: December 22, 1975 (age 50)
- Place of birth: Shiwa, Iwate, Japan
- Height: 1.75 m (5 ft 9 in)
- Position: Forward

Youth career
- 1991–1993: Verdy Kawasaki

Senior career*
Years	Team	Apps	(Gls)
1994–1997	Denso		
1998–2005	Sagan Tosu	204	(35)
2006	Grulla Morioka	9	(2)
Total		213	(37)
- * Club domestic league appearances and goals

Omi Sato (佐藤 大実, Satō Ōmi; born December 22, 1975) is a former Japanese football player.

== Playing career ==
Sato was born in Shiwa, Iwate on December 22, 1975. He joined Regional Leagues club Nippon Denso (later Denso) from Verdy Kawasaki youth team in 1994. The club was promoted to Japan Football League (JFL) from 1997. In 1998, he moved to JFL club Sagan Tosu. He played as forward and offensive midfielder and the club was promoted to new league J2 League from 1999. Although he played many matches for a long time, his opportunity to play decreased in 2005. In 2006, he moved to Regional Leagues club Grulla Morioka based in his local Iwate Prefecture. He played for the club in 1 season and retired end of 2006 season.

== Career statistics ==
Appearances and goals by club, season and competition
Club	Season	League			Emperor's Cup		J.League Cup		Total	
Club	Season	Division	Apps	Goals	Apps	Goals	Apps	Goals	Apps	Goals
Japan
Nippon Denso	1994	Regional Leagues								
Nippon Denso	1995	Regional Leagues								
Denso	1996	Football League	4	0	3	1	—		7	1
Denso	1997	Football League	20	4	1	0	—		21	4
Sagan Tosu	1998	Football League	22	6	3	1	—		25	7
Sagan Tosu	1999	J2 League	27	3	3	0	1	0	31	3
Sagan Tosu	2000	J2 League	17	1	2	0	2	0	21	1
Sagan Tosu	2001	J2 League	32	10	0	0	2	0	34	10
Sagan Tosu	2002	J2 League	40	4	3	1	—		43	5
Sagan Tosu	2003	J2 League	30	6	0	0	—		30	6
Sagan Tosu	2004	J2 League	26	5	2	1	—		28	6
Sagan Tosu	2005	J2 League	10	0	1	0	—		11	0
Grulla Morioka	2006	Regional Leagues	9	2	—		—		9	2
Career total			237	41	18	4	5	0	260	45
