= Haruhiko Sato =

Japanese footballer

Haruhiko Sato 佐藤 陽彦
Personal information
- Full name: Haruhiko Sato
- Date of birth: 27 June 1978 (age 48)
- Place of birth: Tokyo, Japan
- Height: 1.78 m (5 ft 10 in)
- Position: Defender

Youth career
- 1994–1996: Funabashi High School

Senior career*
| Years | Team | Apps | (Gls) |
| 1997–1998 | Kyoto Purple Sanga | 0 | (0) |
| 1999–2004 | Sagan Tosu | 211 | (5) |
| 2005–2006 | ALO's Hokuriku | 63 | (2) |
| Total | | 274 | (7) |
- * Club domestic league appearances and goals

Haruhiko Sato (佐藤 陽彦, Satō Haruhiko; born 27 June 1978) is a former Japanese football player.

== Playing career ==
Sato was born in Tokyo on 27 June 1978. After graduating from high school, he joined J1 League club Kyoto Purple Sanga in 1997. However he could not play at all in the match until 1998. In 1999, he moved to newly was promoted to J2 League club, Sagan Tosu with Ryo Fukudome. He became a regular player as center back and played many matches for the club for a long time. In 2005, he moved to Japan Football League club ALO's Hokuriku. He retired at the end of the 2006 season.

== Career statistics ==
Appearances and goals by club, season and competition
| Club | Season | League | | | Emperor's Cup | | J.League Cup | | Total | |
| Club | Season | Division | Apps | Goals | Apps | Goals | Apps | Goals | Apps | Goals |
|---|---|---|---|---|---|---|---|---|---|---|
| Kyoto Purple Sanga | 1997 | J1 League | 0 | 0 | 0 | 0 | 0 | 0 | 0 | 0 |
| Kyoto Purple Sanga | 1998 | J1 League | 0 | 0 | 0 | 0 | 0 | 0 | 0 | 0 |
| Sagan Tosu | 1999 | J2 League | 32 | 0 | 3 | 0 | 2 | 0 | 37 | 0 |
| Sagan Tosu | 2000 | J2 League | 37 | 0 | 3 | 0 | 2 | 0 | 42 | 0 |
| Sagan Tosu | 2001 | J2 League | 38 | 3 | 4 | 0 | 2 | 0 | 44 | 3 |
| Sagan Tosu | 2002 | J2 League | 37 | 2 | 2 | 1 | — | | 39 | 3 |
| Sagan Tosu | 2003 | J2 League | 31 | 0 | 1 | 0 | — | | 32 | 0 |
| Sagan Tosu | 2004 | J2 League | 36 | 0 | 0 | 0 | — | | 36 | 0 |
| ALO's Hokuriku | 2005 | Football League | 29 | 2 | 4 | 0 | — | | 33 | 2 |
| ALO's Hokuriku | 2006 | Football League | 34 | 0 | — | | — | | 34 | 0 |
| Career total | | | 274 | 7 | 17 | 1 | 6 | 0 | 297 | 8 |
