= 2002 Gamba Osaka season =

Gamba Osaka
2002 season
- Manager: Akira Nishino
- Stadium: Osaka Expo '70 Stadium
- J. League 1: 3rd
- Emperor's Cup: 4th Round
- J. League Cup: Semifinals
- Top goalscorer: Magrão (22)
Home colours	Away colours

2002 Gamba Osaka season

== Competitions ==
Competitions	Position
J. League 1	3rd / 16 clubs
Emperor's Cup	4th Round
J. League Cup	Semifinals

== Domestic results ==
=== J. League 1 ===
Match	Date	Venue	Opponents	Score
1-1	2002/3/3	Osaka Expo '70 Stadium	Kashiwa Reysol	1-0
1-2	2002/3/10	Nishikyogoku Athletic Stadium	Kyoto Purple Sanga	2-0
1-3	2002/3/17	Osaka Expo '70 Stadium	Vissel Kobe	1-3
1-4	2002/3/31	Osaka Expo '70 Stadium	Urawa Red Diamonds	2-2 (a.e.t.)
1-5	2002/4/7	International Stadium Yokohama	Yokohama F. Marinos	1-2 (a.e.t.) (golden goal)
1-6	2002/4/13	Osaka Expo '70 Stadium	F.C. Tokyo	5-0
1-7	2002/4/20	Osaka Expo '70 Stadium	JEF United Ichihara	3-0
1-8	2002/7/14	Nihondaira Sports Stadium	Shimizu S-Pulse	4-1
1-9	2002/7/21	Osaka Expo '70 Stadium	Nagoya Grampus Eight	3-2 (a.e.t.) (golden goal)
1-10	2002/7/24	Hiroshima Stadium	Sanfrecce Hiroshima	2-1
1-11	2002/7/28	Kanazawa (ja:石川県西部緑地公園陸上競技場)	Vegalta Sendai	3-0
1-12	2002/8/3	Yamaha Stadium	Júbilo Iwata	4-5 (a.e.t.) (golden goal)
1-13	2002/8/7	Osaka Expo '70 Stadium	Tokyo Verdy 1969	3-0
1-14	2002/8/10	Sapporo Atsubetsu Park Stadium	Consadole Sapporo	0-1
1-15	2002/8/17	Kashima Soccer Stadium	Kashima Antlers	1-2
2-1	2002/8/31	Osaka Expo '70 Stadium	Yokohama F. Marinos	4-1
2-2	2002/9/7	Tokyo Stadium	F.C. Tokyo	0-1
2-3	2002/9/14	Osaka Expo '70 Stadium	Shimizu S-Pulse	2-1 (a.e.t.) (golden goal)
2-4	2002/9/18	Osaka Expo '70 Stadium	Sanfrecce Hiroshima	1-0
2-5	2002/9/21	Toyota Stadium	Nagoya Grampus Eight	1-0
2-6	2002/9/28	Naruto Athletic Stadium	Vissel Kobe	2-3 (a.e.t.) (golden goal)
2-7	2002/10/5	Osaka Expo '70 Stadium	Júbilo Iwata	0-2
2-8	2002/10/12	Sendai Stadium	Vegalta Sendai	6-0
2-9	2002/10/19	Osaka Expo '70 Stadium	Consadole Sapporo	1-0
2-10	2002/10/23	Tokyo Stadium	Tokyo Verdy 1969	3-0
2-11	2002/10/26	Ichihara Seaside Stadium	JEF United Ichihara	1-0 (a.e.t.) (golden goal)
2-12	2002/11/9	Osaka Expo '70 Stadium	Kashima Antlers	0-2
2-13	2002/11/16	Urawa Komaba Stadium	Urawa Red Diamonds	1-0
2-14	2002/11/23	Osaka Expo '70 Stadium	Kyoto Purple Sanga	2-1 (a.e.t.) (golden goal)
2-15	2002/11/30	Hitachi Kashiwa Soccer Stadium	Kashiwa Reysol	0-2

=== Emperor's Cup ===
Match	Date	Venue	Opponents	Score
3rd Round	2002..	[[]]	[[]]	-
4th Round	2002..	[[]]	[[]]	-

=== J. League Cup ===
Match	Date	Venue	Opponents	Score
GL-C-1	2002..	[[]]	[[]]	-
GL-C-2	2002..	[[]]	[[]]	-
GL-C-3	2002..	[[]]	[[]]	-
GL-C-4	2002..	[[]]	[[]]	-
GL-C-5	2002..	[[]]	[[]]	-
GL-C-6	2002..	[[]]	[[]]	-
Quarterfinals	2002..	[[]]	[[]]	-
Semifinals	2002..	[[]]	[[]]	-

== Player statistics ==
No.	Pos.	Player	D.o.B. (Age)	Height / Weight	J. League 1		Emperor's Cup		J. League Cup		Total	
No.	Pos.	Player	D.o.B. (Age)	Height / Weight	Apps	Goals	Apps	Goals	Apps	Goals	Apps	Goals
1	GK	Naoki Matsuyo	April 9, 1974 (aged 27)	cm / kg	18	0						
2	DF	Shin Asahina	August 20, 1976 (aged 25)	cm / kg	2	0						
3	DF	Masao Kiba	September 6, 1974 (aged 27)	cm / kg	30	0						
4	DF	Noritada Saneyoshi	October 19, 1972 (aged 29)	cm / kg	15	0						
5	DF	Satoshi Yamaguchi	April 17, 1978 (aged 23)	cm / kg	29	2						
6	DF	Masahiro Ando	April 2, 1972 (aged 29)	cm / kg	2	0						
7	MF	Marcelinho Carioca	February 1, 1971 (aged 31)	cm / kg	21	3						
8	MF	Takahiro Futagawa	June 27, 1980 (aged 21)	cm / kg	28	2						
9	FW	Magrão	February 21, 1974 (aged 28)	cm / kg	29	22						
10	MF	Vital	February 29, 1976 (aged 26)	cm / kg	0	0						
10	MF	Fabinho	October 16, 1976 (aged 25)	cm / kg	20	0						
11	FW	Masanobu Matsunami	November 21, 1974 (aged 27)	cm / kg	23	5						
13	MF	Shigeru Morioka	August 12, 1973 (aged 28)	cm / kg	21	1						
14	MF	Naohiro Tamura	July 3, 1978 (aged 23)	cm / kg	0	0						
15	MF	Shinsuke Sakimoto	April 14, 1982 (aged 19)	cm / kg	0	0						
16	FW	Masashi Oguro	May 4, 1980 (aged 21)	cm / kg	6	1						
17	DF	Toru Araiba	July 12, 1979 (aged 22)	cm / kg	30	1						
18	FW	Kota Yoshihara	February 2, 1978 (aged 24)	cm / kg	27	11						
19	MF	Daisuke Aono	September 19, 1979 (aged 22)	cm / kg	0	0						
20	FW	Koki Habata	July 22, 1983 (aged 18)	cm / kg	2	0						
21	MF	Hirotaka Uchibayashi	June 27, 1983 (aged 18)	cm / kg	0	0						
22	GK	Suguru Hino	July 29, 1982 (aged 19)	cm / kg	0	0						
23	GK	Ryōta Tsuzuki	April 18, 1978 (aged 23)	cm / kg	12	0						
24	MF	Toshihiro Matsushita	October 17, 1983 (aged 18)	cm / kg	5	0						
25	DF	Yusuke Igawa	October 30, 1982 (aged 19)	cm / kg	0	0						
26	FW	Satoshi Nakayama	November 7, 1981 (aged 20)	cm / kg	12	2						
27	MF	Hideo Hashimoto	May 21, 1979 (aged 22)	cm / kg	18	0						
28	DF	Arata Kodama	October 8, 1982 (aged 19)	cm / kg	0	0						
30	MF	Yasuhito Endō	January 28, 1980 (aged 22)	cm / kg	30	5						
31	GK	Koichi Ae	April 15, 1976 (aged 25)	cm / kg	0	0						
33	DF	Hiroshige Yanagimoto	October 15, 1972 (aged 29)	cm / kg	11	0						
35	DF	Tsuneyasu Miyamoto	February 7, 1977 (aged 25)	cm / kg	20	1						

== Other pages ==
- (in Japanese) J. League official site
