= Junnosuke Schneider =

Japanese footballer

Junnosuke Schneider シュナイダー 潤之介
Personal information
- Full name: Junnosuke Schneider
- Date of birth: 22 May 1977 (age 49)
- Place of birth: Shinjuku, Tokyo, Japan
- Date of death: 22 November 2026 (aged 49)
- Height: 1.85 m (6 ft 1 in)
- Position: Goalkeeper

Youth career
- 1993–1995: Meisei High School
- 1996–1999: Meisei University

Senior career*
Years	Team	Apps	(Gls)
2000	Gunma FC Fortona		
2001–2006	Sagan Tosu	131	(0)
2007–2008	Vegalta Sendai	18	(0)
2009	Gainare Tottori	34	(0)
2010–2013	Yokohama FC	77	(0)
2014–2015	Nara Club	42	(0)
Total		302	(0)
- * Club domestic league appearances and goals

Junnosuke Schneider (シュナイダー 潤之介, Shunaidā Junnosuke; 22 May 1977 - 22 November 2026) was a Japanese former football player. He was a goalkeeper coach of J3 League club AC Nagano Parceiro.

== Playing career ==
Schneider was born in Shinjuku, Tokyo on 22 May 1977. He is the son of a Swiss-German father and a Japanese mother. After graduating from Meisei University, he joined Prefectural Leagues club Gunma FC Fortona in 2000. In 2001, he moved to J2 League club Sagan Tosu. He debuted in 2002 and played many matches as goalkeeper. He became a regular goalkeeper from summer 2004. In 2007, he moved to J2 club Vegalta Sendai. He became a regular goalkeeper soon. However he lost his position for injury in June 2007 and he could not play at all in the match after the injury. In 2009, he moved to Japan Football League (JFL) club Gainare Tottori. He played all 34 matches in 2009 season. In 2010, he moved to J2 club Yokohama FC. Although he played many matches until summer 2010, he could not play at all in the match behind Kentaro Seki from September 2010. In April 2012, Schneider became a regular goalkeeper again under new manager Motohiro Yamaguchi. In 2014, he moved to Regional Leagues club Nara Club. The club was promoted to JFL from 2015. He retired end of 2015 season.

== Club statistics ==
Club performance			League		Cup		League Cup		Total	
Season	Club	League	Apps	Goals	Apps	Goals	Apps	Goals	Apps	Goals
Japan			League		Emperor's Cup		J.League Cup		Total	
2000	Gunma FC Fortona	Prefectural Leagues			1	0	-		1	0
2001	Sagan Tosu	J2 League	0	0	0	0	0	0	0	0
2002	Sagan Tosu	J2 League	24	0	1	0	-		25	0
2003	Sagan Tosu	J2 League	10	0	0	0	-		10	0
2004	Sagan Tosu	J2 League	26	0	2	0	-		28	0
2005	Sagan Tosu	J2 League	40	0	2	0	-		42	0
2006	Sagan Tosu	J2 League	31	0	2	0	-		33	0
2007	Vegalta Sendai	J2 League	18	0	0	0	-		18	0
2008	Vegalta Sendai	J2 League	0	0	0	0	-		0	0
2009	Gainare Tottori	Football League	34	0	1	0	-		35	0
2010	Yokohama FC	J2 League	17	0	1	0	-		18	0
2011	Yokohama FC	J2 League	0	0	0	0	-		0	0
2012	Yokohama FC	J2 League	34	0	1	0	-		35	0
2013	Yokohama FC	J2 League	26	0	0	0	-		26	0
2014	Nara Club	Regional Leagues	14	0	3	0	-		17	0
2015	Nara Club	Football League	28	0	1	0	-		29	0
Total			302	0	15	0	0	0	317	0
