= Shin Asahina =

Japanese footballer

Shin Asahina 朝比奈 伸
Personal information
- Full name: Shin Asahina
- Date of birth: August 20, 1976 (age 50)
- Place of birth: Fujieda, Shizuoka, Japan
- Height: 1.82 m (5 ft 11 1/2 in)
- Position: Defender

Youth career
- 1992–1994: Shimizu Commercial High School
- 1995–1998: Doshisha University

Senior career*
Years	Team	Apps	(Gls)
1999–2002	Gamba Osaka	16	(0)
2003–2004	Sagan Tosu	61	(3)
2005–2006	Rosso Kumamoto	46	(9)
2007	Banditonce Kobe	11	(2)
2008–2009	TDK	44	(1)
Total		178	(15)
- * Club domestic league appearances and goals

Shin Asahina (朝比奈 伸, Asahina Shin; born August 20, 1976) is a former Japanese football player.

== Playing career ==
Asahina was born in Fujieda on August 20, 1976. After graduating from Doshisha University, he joined J1 League club Gamba Osaka in 1999. He played several matches as center back every season from first season. However he could not play many matches until 2002. In 2003, he moved to J2 League club Sagan Tosu. He played many matches as regular center back in 2 seasons. In 2005, he moved to Regional Leagues club Rosso Kumamoto. He played as regular player and the club was promoted to Japan Football League (JFL) from 2006. In 2008, he moved to Regional Leagues club Banditonce Kobe and played many matches. In 2008, he moved to JFL club TDK. He played many matches in 2 seasons and retired end of 2009 season.

== Club statistics ==
Club performance			League		Cup		League Cup		Total	
Season	Club	League	Apps	Goals	Apps	Goals	Apps	Goals	Apps	Goals
Japan			League		Emperor's Cup		J.League Cup		Total	
1999	Gamba Osaka	J1 League	4	0	0	0	1	0	5	0
2000	Gamba Osaka	J1 League	4	0	0	0	0	0	4	0
2001	Gamba Osaka	J1 League	6	0	2	0	1	0	9	0
2002	Gamba Osaka	J1 League	2	0	0	0	0	0	2	0
2003	Sagan Tosu	J2 League	26	2	0	0	-		26	2
2004	Sagan Tosu	J2 League	35	1	2	0	-		37	1
2005	Rosso Kumamoto	Regional Leagues	15	1	1	1	-		16	2
2006	Rosso Kumamoto	Football League	31	8	1	0	-		32	8
2007	Banditonce Kobe	Regional Leagues	11	2	1	0	-		12	2
2008	TDK	Football League	30	1	1	0	-		31	1
2009	TDK	Football League	14	0	0	0	-		14	0
Total			178	15	8	1	2	0	188	16
