= Koji Kumagai =

Japanese footballer

Koji Kumagai 熊谷 浩二
Personal information
- Full name: Koji Kumagai
- Date of birth: October 23, 1975 (age 51)
- Place of birth: Towada, Aomori, Japan
- Height: 1.77 m (5 ft 9 1/2 in)
- Position: Midfielder

Youth career
- 1991–1993: Sanbongi Agricultural High School

Senior career*
Years	Team	Apps	(Gls)
1994–2004	Kashima Antlers	116	(10)
2004–2005	Vegalta Sendai	40	(0)
Total		156	(10)

International career
1995	Japan U-20	4	(0)
Medal record
Kashima Antlers
Winner	J1 League	1996
Winner	J1 League	1998
Winner	J1 League	2000
Winner	J1 League	2001
Runner-up	J1 League	1997
Winner	J.League Cup	1997
Winner	J.League Cup	2000
Winner	J.League Cup	2002
Runner-up	J.League Cup	1999
Runner-up	J.League Cup	2003
Winner	Emperor's Cup	1997
Winner	Emperor's Cup	2000
Runner-up	Emperor's Cup	2002
- * Club domestic league appearances and goals

Koji Kumagai (熊谷 浩二, Kumagai Koji; born October 23, 1975) is a former Japanese football player.

== Club career ==
Kumagai was born in Towada on October 23, 1975. After graduating from high school, he joined the Kashima Antlers in 1994. Although he could did not play much during the 1990s, he played often as defensive midfielder in 2000. In 2000, the club won the championship in all three major titles in Japan: J1 League, the J.League Cup, and the Emperor's Cup. That was the first time in J1 League history. The club also won the championship in the 2001 J1 League and the 2002 J.League Cup. In 2003, he did not play as much and he moved to Vegalta Sendai in July 2004. He retired at the end of the 2005 season.

== National team career ==
In April 1995, Kumagai was selected Japan U-20 national team for 1995 World Youth Championship. He played full time in all four matches as defensive midfielder.

== Career statistics ==
Appearances and goals by club, season and competition
Club	Season	League			Emperor's Cup		J.League Cup		Total	
Club	Season	Division	Apps	Goals	Apps	Goals	Apps	Goals	Apps	Goals
Kashima Antlers	1994	J1 League	11	0	0	0	0	0	11	0
Kashima Antlers	1995	J1 League	6	1	0	0	—		6	1
Kashima Antlers	1996	J1 League	9	1	0	0	4	0	13	1
Kashima Antlers	1997	J1 League	5	0	1	0	5	0	11	0
Kashima Antlers	1998	J1 League	4	2	0	0	0	0	4	2
Kashima Antlers	1999	J1 League	10	3	2	0	3	1	15	4
Kashima Antlers	2000	J1 League	24	1	4	1	6	0	34	2
Kashima Antlers	2001	J1 League	20	0	2	0	5	0	27	0
Kashima Antlers	2002	J1 League	19	2	0	0	8	0	27	2
Kashima Antlers	2003	J1 League	1	0	0	0	1	0	2	0
Kashima Antlers	2004	J1 League	7	0	0	0	0	0	7	0
Vegalta Sendai	2004	J2 League	13	0	2	0	—		15	0
Vegalta Sendai	2005	J2 League	27	0	1	0	—		28	0
Career total			156	10	12	1	32	1	200	12
