= Ryo Fukudome =

Japanese footballer

Ryo Fukudome 福留 亮
Personal information
- Full name: Ryo Fukudome
- Date of birth: June 26, 1978 (age 48)
- Place of birth: Kumamoto, Japan
- Height: 1.74 m (5 ft 8 1/2 in)
- Position: Forward

Youth career
- 1994–1996: Ozu High School

Senior career*
Years	Team	Apps	(Gls)
1997–1998	Kyoto Purple Sanga	0	(0)
1999–2002	Sagan Tosu	60	(9)
Total		60	(9)
- * Club domestic league appearances and goals

Ryo Fukudome (福留 亮, Fukudome Ryo; born June 26, 1978) is a former Japanese football player.

== Playing career ==
Fukudome was born in Kumamoto Prefecture on June 26, 1978. After graduating from high school, he joined the J1 League club Kyoto Purple Sanga in 1997. However he did not play in any matches until 1998. In 1999, he moved to the newly promoted J2 League club, Sagan Tosu with Haruhiko Sato. He played many matches as forward until 2001. However, he did not play in any matches in 2002 and retired at the end of the 2002 season.

== Career statistics ==
Appearances and goals by club, season and competition
Club	Season	League			Emperor's Cup		J.League Cup		Total	
Club	Season	Division	Apps	Goals	Apps	Goals	Apps	Goals	Apps	Goals
Kyoto Purple Sanga	1997	J1 League	0	0	0	0	0	0	0	0
Kyoto Purple Sanga	1998	J1 League	0	0	0	0	0	0	0	0
Sagan Tosu	1999	J2 League	26	7	2	0	2	0	30	7
Sagan Tosu	2000	J2 League	11	1	1	0	0	0	12	1
Sagan Tosu	2001	J2 League	23	1	2	0	1	1	26	2
Sagan Tosu	2002	J2 League	0	0	0	0	0	0	0	0
Career total			60	9	5	0	3	1	68	10
