= Jefferson (footballer, born 1981) =

Brazilian footballer

Personal information
- Full name: Jefferson Vieira da Cruz
- Date of birth: July 3, 1981 (age 45)
- Place of birth: Brazil
- Height: 1.85 m (6 ft 1 in)
- Position: Striker

Senior career*
Years	Team	Apps	(Gls)
1999–2001	Flamengo		
2002	Bangu		
2003	Sagan Tosu		
2004–2005	Yokohama FC		
2006–2008	Fagiano Okayama		
2008	Centro de Futebol Zico		
2009	Cruz Azul		
2009	Tornion Pallo -47		
- * Club domestic league appearances and goals

Jefferson Vieira da Cruz (born July 3, 1981) is a Brazilian football player. He was active from 1999 to 2009, and retired on January 1, 2010.

== Career statistics ==
Appearances and goals by club, season and competition
Club	Season	League			Emperor's Cup		Total	
Club	Season	Division	Apps	Goals	Apps	Goals	Apps	Goals
Sagan Tosu	2003	J2 League	30	6	1	0	31	6
Yokohama FC	2004	J2 League	11	2	0	0	11	2
Yokohama FC	2005	J2 League	11	4	0	0	11	4
Career total			52	12	1	0	53	12
