= Naoki Ishibashi =

Japanese footballer

Naoki Ishibashi 石橋 直希
Personal information
- Full name: Naoki Ishibashi
- Date of birth: May 14, 1981 (age 45)
- Place of birth: Saitama, Japan
- Height: 1.75 m (5 ft 9 in)
- Position: Midfielder

Senior career*
Years	Team	Apps	(Gls)
2000–2001	Yokohama FC	4	(2)
2002–2003	Sagan Tosu	15	(0)
2003–2006	ALO's Hokuriku	92	(33)
Total		111	(35)
- * Club domestic league appearances and goals

Naoki Ishibashi (石橋 直希, Ishibashi Naoki; born May 14, 1981) is a former Japanese football player.

== Playing career ==
Ishibashi was born in Saitama Prefecture on May 14, 1981. He joined the Japan Football League (JFL) club Yokohama FC in 2000. Yokohama FC won the championship in 2000 and was promoted to the J2 League. However he did not play much over the next two seasons. In 2002, he moved to the J2 club Sagan Tosu. Although he played as substitute midfielder in 2002, he did not play much in 2003. In August 2003, he moved to the JFL club ALO's Hokuriku. He became a regular player and played often. He retired at the end of the 2006 season.

== Career statistics ==
Appearances and goals by club, season and competition
Club	Season	League			Emperor's Cup		J.League Cup		Total	
Club	Season	Division	Apps	Goals	Apps	Goals	Apps	Goals	Apps	Goals
Yokohama FC	2000	Football League	4	2	0	0	—		4	2
Yokohama FC	2001	J2 League	0	0	0	0	0	0	0	0
Sagan Tosu	2002	J2 League	14	0	3	1	—		17	1
Sagan Tosu	2003	J2 League	1	0	0	0	—		1	0
ALO's Hokuriku	2003	Football League	11	3			—		11	3
ALO's Hokuriku	2004	Football League	28	8			—		28	8
ALO's Hokuriku	2005	Football League	28	14	4	3	—		32	17
ALO's Hokuriku	2006	Football League	25	8	—		—		25	8
Career total			111	35	7	4	0	0	118	39
