= Kohei Yamamichi =

Japanese footballer

Kohei Yamamichi 山道 高平
Personal information
- Full name: Kohei Yamamichi
- Date of birth: May 11, 1980 (age 46)
- Place of birth: Nagoya, Japan
- Height: 1.74 m (5 ft 8 1/2 in)
- Position: Defender

Youth career
- 1996–1998: Nagoya Grampus Eight

Senior career*
| Years | Team | Apps | (Gls) |
| 1999–2000 | Nagoya Grampus Eight | 0 | (0) |
| 2001–2005 | Sagan Tosu | 119 | (0) |
| 2006–2007 | Banditonce Kobe | 27 | (2) |
| Total | | 146 | (2) |
Medal record
Nagoya Grampus Eight
| Winner | Emperor's Cup | 1999 |
- * Club domestic league appearances and goals

Kohei Yamamichi (山道 高平, Yamamichi Kohei; born May 11, 1980) is a former Japanese football player.

== Playing career ==
Yamamichi was born in Nagoya on May 11, 1980. He joined J1 League club Nagoya Grampus Eight from youth team in 1999. However he could not play at all in the match until 2000. In 2001, he moved to J2 League club Sagan Tosu. He played many matches as center back. In 2006, he moved to Regional Leagues club Banditonce Kobe. He played as regular player in 2 seasons. He retired end of 2007 season.

== Career statistics ==
Appearances and goals by club, season and competition
| Club | Season | League | | | Emperor's Cup | | J.League Cup | | Total | |
| Club | Season | Division | Apps | Goals | Apps | Goals | Apps | Goals | Apps | Goals |
|---|---|---|---|---|---|---|---|---|---|---|
| Nagoya Grampus Eight | 1999 | J1 League | 0 | 0 | 0 | 0 | 0 | 0 | 0 | 0 |
| Nagoya Grampus Eight | 2000 | J1 League | 0 | 0 | 0 | 0 | 0 | 0 | 0 | 0 |
| Sagan Tosu | 2001 | J2 League | 31 | 0 | 4 | 0 | 1 | 0 | 36 | 0 |
| Sagan Tosu | 2002 | J2 League | 24 | 0 | 2 | 0 | — | | 26 | 0 |
| Sagan Tosu | 2003 | J2 League | 15 | 0 | 0 | 0 | — | | 15 | 0 |
| Sagan Tosu | 2004 | J2 League | 33 | 0 | 1 | 0 | — | | 34 | 0 |
| Sagan Tosu | 2005 | J2 League | 16 | 0 | 2 | 0 | — | | 18 | 0 |
| Banditonce Kobe | 2006 | Regional Leagues | 13 | 1 | 2 | 1 | — | | 15 | 2 |
| Banditonce Kobe | 2007 | Regional Leagues | 14 | 1 | 3 | 2 | — | | 17 | 3 |
| Career total | | | 146 | 2 | 14 | 3 | 1 | 0 | 161 | 5 |
