= 2001 Kashima Antlers season =

Kashima Antlers
2001 season
- Manager: Toninho Cerezo
- Stadium: Kashima Soccer Stadium
- J.League 1: Champions
- Emperor's Cup: Quarterfinals
- J.League Cup: Semifinals
- Top goalscorer: Atsushi Yanagisawa (12)
Home colours	Away colours

2001 Kashima Antlers season

== Competitions ==
Competitions	Position
J.League 1	Champions / 16 clubs
Emperor's Cup	Quarterfinals
J.League Cup	Semifinals

== Domestic results ==
=== J.League 1 ===
11 March 2001 1-1	Kashima Antlers	2-1	Sanfrecce Hiroshima	Tokyo National Stadium
JST (UTC+09)

17 March 2001 1-2	Tokyo Verdy 1969	2-1 (GG) (a.e.t.)	Kashima Antlers	Tokyo Stadium
JST (UTC+09)

31 March 2001 1-3	Cerezo Osaka	0-0 (GG) (a.e.t.)	Kashima Antlers	Osaka Nagai Stadium
JST (UTC+09)

7 April 2001 1-4	Kashima Antlers	1-2	Júbilo Iwata	Tokyo National Stadium
JST (UTC+09)

14 April 2001 1-5	Nagoya Grampus Eight	2-1 (GG) (a.e.t.)	Kashima Antlers	Mizuho Athletic Stadium
JST (UTC+09)

29 April 2001 1-6	Kashima Antlers	2-1	Urawa Red Diamonds	Tokyo National Stadium
JST (UTC+09)

3 May 2001 1-7	JEF United Ichihara	2-0	Kashima Antlers	Ichihara Seaside Stadium
JST (UTC+09)

6 May 2001 1-8	Kashima Antlers	3-4 (GG) (a.e.t.)	Shimizu S-Pulse	Tokyo National Stadium
JST (UTC+09)

12 May 2001 1-9	Consadole Sapporo	2-1	Kashima Antlers	Sapporo Atsubetsu Park Stadium
JST (UTC+09)

19 May 2001 1-10	Kashima Antlers	3-2 (GG) (a.e.t.)	Kashiwa Reysol	Kashima Soccer Stadium
JST (UTC+09)

16 June 2001 1-11	Avispa Fukuoka	0-2	Kashima Antlers	Hakatanomori Football Stadium
JST (UTC+09)

23 June 2001 1-12	Kashima Antlers	2-0	Yokohama F. Marinos	Kashima Soccer Stadium
JST (UTC+09)

7 July 2001 1-13	FC Tokyo	2-0	Kashima Antlers	Tokyo Stadium
JST (UTC+09)

14 July 2001 1-14	Kashima Antlers	2-0	Vissel Kobe	Kashima Soccer Stadium
JST (UTC+09)

21 July 2001 1-15	Gamba Osaka	3-1	Kashima Antlers	Osaka Expo '70 Stadium
JST (UTC+09)

11 August 2001 2-1	Kashima Antlers	2-1	Consadole Sapporo	Kashima Soccer Stadium
JST (UTC+09)

18 August 2001 2-2	Shimizu S-Pulse	1-2	Kashima Antlers	Nihondaira Sports Stadium
JST (UTC+09)

25 August 2001 2-3	Kashima Antlers	3-1	Gamba Osaka	Kashima Soccer Stadium
JST (UTC+09)

8 September 2001 2-4	Vissel Kobe	2-3 (GG) (a.e.t.)	Kashima Antlers	Kobe Universiade Memorial Stadium
JST (UTC+09)

15 September 2001 2-5	Kashima Antlers	3-1	JEF United Ichihara	Kashima Soccer Stadium
JST (UTC+09)

22 September 2001 2-6	Urawa Red Diamonds	1-2 (GG) (a.e.t.)	Kashima Antlers	Tokyo National Stadium
JST (UTC+09)

29 September 2001 2-7	Kashima Antlers	4-2	Nagoya Grampus Eight	Kashima Soccer Stadium
JST (UTC+09)

13 October 2001 2-8	Júbilo Iwata	2-0	Kashima Antlers	Shizuoka Stadium
JST (UTC+09)

17 October 2001 2-9	Kashima Antlers	2-1	Cerezo Osaka	Kashima Soccer Stadium
JST (UTC+09)

20 October 2001 2-10	Kashiwa Reysol	0-1	Kashima Antlers	Kashiwanoha Park Stadium
JST (UTC+09)

31 October 2001 2-11	Kashima Antlers	4-1	Avispa Fukuoka	Kashima Soccer Stadium
JST (UTC+09)

3 November 2001 2-12	Yokohama F. Marinos	1-2 (GG) (a.e.t.)	Kashima Antlers	International Stadium Yokohama
JST (UTC+09)

10 November 2001 2-13	Kashima Antlers	3-1	FC Tokyo	Kashima Soccer Stadium
JST (UTC+09)

17 November 2001 2-14	Kashima Antlers	4-0	Tokyo Verdy 1969	Kashima Soccer Stadium
JST (UTC+09)

24 November 2001 2-15	Sanfrecce Hiroshima	4-1	Kashima Antlers	Hiroshima Big Arch
JST (UTC+09)

=== Emperor's Cup ===
1st Round	bye

2nd Round	bye

12 December 2001 3rd Round	Kashima Antlers	6-0	Nara Sangyo University	Kashima Soccer Stadium
JST (UTC+09)

16 December 2001 4th Round	Kashima Antlers	6-0	Sagan Tosu	Ehime Matsuyama Athletic Stadium
JST (UTC+09)

24 December 2001 Quarterfinals	Cerezo Osaka	4-2	Kashima Antlers	Osaka Nagai Stadium
JST (UTC+09)

=== J.League Cup ===
1st Round	bye

13 June 2001 2nd Round-1	Kashiwa Reysol	3-1	Kashima Antlers	Kashiwanoha Park Stadium
JST (UTC+09)

20 June 2001 2nd Round-2	Kashima Antlers	4-0 (5-3 agg.)	Kashiwa Reysol	Kashima Soccer Stadium
JST (UTC+09)

8 August 2001 Quarterfinals-1	Urawa Red Diamonds	1-0	Kashima Antlers	Urawa Komaba Stadium
JST (UTC+09)

29 August 2001 Quarterfinals-2	Kashima Antlers	2-0 (GG) (a.e.t.) (2-1 agg.)	Urawa Red Diamonds	Kashima Soccer Stadium
JST (UTC+09)

26 September 2001 Semifinals-1	Júbilo Iwata	1-0	Kashima Antlers	Júbilo Iwata Stadium
JST (UTC+09)

10 October 2001 Semifinals-2	Kashima Antlers	0-0 (0-1 agg.)	Júbilo Iwata	Kashima Soccer Stadium
JST (UTC+09)

== Player statistics ==
No.	Pos.	Nat.	Player	D.o.B. (Age)	Height / Weight	J.League 1		Emperor's Cup		J.League Cup		Total	
No.	Pos.	Nat.	Player	D.o.B. (Age)	Height / Weight	Apps	Goals	Apps	Goals	Apps	Goals	Apps	Goals
1	GK	(Japan)	Daijiro Takakuwa	August 10, 1973 (aged 27)	cm / kg	9	0						
2	DF	(Japan)	Akira Narahashi	November 26, 1971 (aged 29)	cm / kg	27	3						
3	DF	(Japan)	Yutaka Akita	August 6, 1970 (aged 30)	cm / kg	29	2						
4	DF	(Brazil)	Fabiano	August 4, 1975 (aged 25)	cm / kg	19	0						
5	MF	(Japan)	Kōji Nakata	July 9, 1979 (aged 21)	cm / kg	25	8						
6	MF	(Japan)	Yasuto Honda	June 25, 1969 (aged 31)	cm / kg	24	0						
7	DF	(Japan)	Naoki Soma	July 19, 1971 (aged 29)	cm / kg	7	0						
8	MF	(Japan)	Mitsuo Ogasawara	April 5, 1979 (aged 21)	cm / kg	24	7						
9	FW	(Japan)	Tomoyuki Hirase	May 23, 1977 (aged 23)	cm / kg	23	0						
10	MF	(Brazil)	Bismarck	September 17, 1969 (aged 31)	cm / kg	26	6						
11	FW	(Japan)	Yoshiyuki Hasegawa	February 11, 1969 (aged 32)	cm / kg	11	2						
13	FW	(Japan)	Atsushi Yanagisawa	May 27, 1977 (aged 23)	cm / kg	26	12						
14	DF	(Japan)	Kenji Haneda	December 1, 1981 (aged 19)	cm / kg	6	1						
15	DF	(Japan)	Seiji Kaneko	May 27, 1980 (aged 20)	cm / kg	8	1						
16	MF	(Japan)	Masashi Motoyama	June 20, 1979 (aged 21)	cm / kg	21	3						
17	DF	(Japan)	Jun Uchida	October 14, 1977 (aged 23)	cm / kg	9	0						
18	MF	(Japan)	Koji Kumagai	October 23, 1975 (aged 25)	cm / kg	20	0						
19	DF	(Japan)	Yoshiro Nakamura	October 17, 1979 (aged 21)	cm / kg	9	0						
20	FW	(Japan)	Jo Nakajima	July 3, 1980 (aged 20)	cm / kg	0	0						
21	GK	(Japan)	Hitoshi Sogahata	August 2, 1979 (aged 21)	cm / kg	21	0						
22	DF	(Japan)	Ryuta Matsushima	November 12, 1980 (aged 20)	cm / kg	0	0						
23	MF	(Japan)	Takeshi Yamaguchi	June 10, 1979 (aged 21)	cm / kg	0	0						
24	MF	(Japan)	Takeshi Aoki	September 28, 1982 (aged 18)	cm / kg	8	0						
25	MF	(Japan)	Takuya Nozawa	August 12, 1981 (aged 19)	cm / kg	5	0						
26	DF	(Japan)	Yuichi Nemoto	July 21, 1981 (aged 19)	cm / kg	5	0						
27	FW	(Japan)	Kosei Nakamura	April 5, 1981 (aged 19)	cm / kg	0	0						
28	DF	(Japan)	Tomohiko Ikeuchi	November 1, 1977 (aged 23)	cm / kg	8	0						
29	GK	(Japan)	Shinya Kato	September 19, 1980 (aged 20)	cm / kg	0	0						
30	FW	(Japan)	Takayuki Suzuki	June 5, 1976 (aged 24)	cm / kg	26	6						
31	FW	(Japan)	Yasutaka Kobayashi	June 15, 1980 (aged 20)	cm / kg	1	0						
32	GK	(Japan)	Koichi Ae	April 15, 1976 (aged 24)	cm / kg	0	0						
33	MF	(Brazil)	Augusto	November 5, 1968 (aged 32)	cm / kg	13	5						
