= Takeshi Ushibana =

Japanese footballer

Takeshi Ushibana 牛鼻 健
Personal information
- Full name: Takeshi Ushibana
- Date of birth: September 21, 1977 (age 49)
- Place of birth: Satsumasendai, Kagoshima, Japan
- Height: 1.73 m (5 ft 8 in)
- Position: Midfielder

Youth career
- 1993–1995: Kagoshima Jitsugyo High School
- 1996–1999: Meiji University

Senior career*
Years	Team	Apps	(Gls)
2000–2002	Avispa Fukuoka	23	(1)
2003–2007	YKK AP	154	(36)
2008	Toyama Shinjo Club		
Total		177	(37)
- * Club domestic league appearances and goals

Takeshi Ushibana (牛鼻 健, Ushibana Takeshi; born September 21, 1977) is a former Japanese football player.

== Playing career ==
Ushibana was born in Satsumasendai, Kagoshima on September 21, 1977. After graduating from Meiji University, he joined J1 League club Avispa Fukuoka in 2000. Although he played several matches as midfielder until 2001, the club was relegated to J2 League from 2002. In 2002, he played many matches as midfielder until summer. However he could not play at all in the match from summer. In 2003, he moved to Japan Football League club YKK (later YKK AP). He became a regular player and played many matches until 2007. In 2008, he moved to Prefectural Leagues club Toyama Shinjo Club. He retired end of 2008 season. He is a U-18 coach at Avispa Fukuoka.

== Career statistics ==
Appearances and goals by club, season and competition
Club	Season	League			Emperor's Cup		J.League Cup		Total	
Club	Season	Division	Apps	Goals	Apps	Goals	Apps	Goals	Apps	Goals
Avispa Fukuoka	2000	J1 League	2	0	2	0	2	1	6	1
Avispa Fukuoka	2001	J1 League	5	0	0	0	3	0	8	0
Avispa Fukuoka	2002	J2 League	16	1	0	0	—		16	1
YKK	2003	Football League	28	4	—		—		28	4
YKK AP	2004	Football League	30	12	—		—		30	12
YKK AP	2005	Football League	30	7	—		—		30	7
YKK AP	2006	Football League	34	6	3	2	—		37	8
YKK AP	2007	Football League	32	7	—		—		32	7
Career total			177	37	5	2	5	1	187	40
