= Tatsuomi Koishi =

Japanese footballer

Tatsuomi Koishi 小石 龍臣
Personal information
- Full name: Tatsuomi Koishi
- Date of birth: August 22, 1977 (age 49)
- Place of birth: Tosu, Saga, Japan
- Height: 1.64 m (5 ft 4 1/2 in)
- Positions: Midfielder; forward

Youth career
- 1993–1995: Higashi Fukuoka High School
- 1996–1999: Rissho University

Senior career*
Years	Team	Apps	(Gls)
2000–2005	Sagan Tosu	141	(15)
2006	ALO's Hokuriku	16	(3)
Total		157	(18)
- * Club domestic league appearances and goals

Tatsuomi Koishi (小石 龍臣, Koishi Tatsuomi; born August 22, 1977) is a former Japanese football player.

== Playing career ==
Koishi was born in Tosu on August 22, 1977. After graduating from Rissho University, he joined the J2 League club Sagan Tosu based in his local area in 2000. He played often as a forward during his first season and made his first appearance on 30 March. In 2003, he played as an offensive midfielder. However he was not played in 2005. In 2006, he moved to the Japan Football League club ALO's Hokuriku. He retired at the end of the 2006 season.

== Club statistics ==
Club performance			League		Cup		League Cup		Total	
Season	Club	League	Apps	Goals	Apps	Goals	Apps	Goals	Apps	Goals
Japan			League		Emperor's Cup		J.League Cup		Total	
2000	Sagan Tosu	J2 League	22	4	2	0	2	0	26	4
2001	Sagan Tosu	J2 League	19	6	0	0	0	0	19	6
2002	Sagan Tosu	J2 League	31	3	1	0	-		32	3
2003	Sagan Tosu	J2 League	29	0	1	0	-		30	0
2004	Sagan Tosu	J2 League	39	2	1	0	-		40	2
2005	Sagan Tosu	J2 League	1	0	0	0	-		1	0
2006	ALO's Hokuriku	Football League	16	3	-		-		16	3
Career total			157	18	5	0	2	0	164	18
