= Fabiano (footballer, born August 1975) =

Brazilian footballer

Personal information
- Full name: Fabiano Cezar Viegas
- Date of birth: August 4, 1975 (age 51)
- Place of birth: Getúlio Vargas, Brazil
- Height: 1.78 m (5 ft 10 in)
- Position: Central defender

Youth career
- 1993–1995: Flamengo

Senior career*
Years	Team	Apps	(Gls)
1996–1999	Flamengo	58	(0)
1999–2000	Atlético-PR	18	(1)
2000–2002	Kashima Antlers	66	(2)
2003	Vegalta Sendai	23	(1)
2004	Atlético-PR	35	(0)
2005	Flamengo	17	(0)
2006–2007	Goiás	15	(1)
2006	Wuhan Guanggu		
2006	Qingdao Jonoon		
2007	Goiás		
2008	Santa Helena		
- * Club domestic league appearances and goals

Fabiano Cezar Viegas, or simply Fabiano (born August 4, 1975), is a Brazilian former professional footballer who played as a central defender.

== Career statistics ==
Club performance			League		Cup		League Cup		Total	
Season	Club	League	Apps	Goals	Apps	Goals	Apps	Goals	Apps	Goals
Brazil			League		Copa do Brasil		League Cup		Total	
1994	Flamengo	Série A	6	0					6	0
1995	Flamengo	Série A	11	0					11	0
1996	Flamengo	Série A	16	0					16	0
1997	Flamengo	Série A	18	0					18	0
1998	Flamengo	Série A	7	1					7	1
1999	Atlético Paranaense	Série A	18	1					18	1
Japan			League		Emperor's Cup		J.League Cup		Total	
2000	Kashima Antlers	J1 League	28	2	4	0	6	0	38	2
2001	Kashima Antlers	J1 League	19	0	2	0	3	0	24	0
2002	Kashima Antlers	J1 League	19	0	2	0	7	0	28	0
2003	Vegalta Sendai	J1 League	23	1	0	0	4	0	27	1
Brazil			League		Copa do Brasil		League Cup		Total	
2004	Atlético Paranaense	Série A	35	0					35	0
2005	Flamengo	Série A	17	0					17	0
2006	Goiás	Série A	14	1					14	1
2007	Goiás	Série A	1	0					1	0
Country	Brazil		143	3					143	3
Country	Japan		89	3	8	0	20	0	117	3
Total			232	6	8	0	20	0	260	6

== Honours ==
- Tournament Rio - São Paulo: 1993
- Rio de Janeiro State League: 1996, 1999
- Japanese League: 2000, 2001
- Nabisco Cup: 2000, 2002
- Emperor Cup: 2000
- Goiás State League: 2006
