= Shinichi Kawaguchi =

Japanese footballer

Shinichi Kawaguchi 河口 真一
Personal information
- Full name: Shinichi Kawaguchi
- Date of birth: June 13, 1977 (age 49)
- Place of birth: Nagasaki, Japan
- Height: 1.88 m (6 ft 2 in)
- Position: Defender

Youth career
- 1993–1995: Kunimi High School
- 1996–1999: Meiji University

Senior career*
Years	Team	Apps	(Gls)
2000–2002	Avispa Fukuoka	26	(0)
Total		26	(0)
- * Club domestic league appearances and goals

Shinichi Kawaguchi (河口 真一, Kawaguchi Shinichi; born June 13, 1977) is a former Japanese football player.

== Playing career ==
Kawaguchi was born in Nagasaki Prefecture on June 13, 1977. After graduating from Meiji University, he joined the J1 League club Avispa Fukuoka in 2000. He became a regular player as center back in the first half of the 2000 season. However he could not play much during the second half of the 2000 season and the club was relegated to the J2 League in 2002. However he did not play often and retired at the end of the 2002 season.

== Career statistics ==
Appearances and goals by club, season and competition
Club	Season	League			Emperor's Cup		J.League Cup		Total	
Club	Season	Division	Apps	Goals	Apps	Goals	Apps	Goals	Apps	Goals
Avispa Fukuoka	2000	J1 League	15	0	1	0	1	0	17	0
Avispa Fukuoka	2001	J1 League	9	0	0	0	3	0	12	0
Avispa Fukuoka	2002	J2 League	2	0	0	0	—		2	0
Career total			26	0	1	0	4	0	31	0
