= Pericles (footballer, born 1975) =

Brazilian footballer

Personal information
- Full name: Pericles de Oliveira Ramos
- Date of birth: 2 January 1975 (age 51)
- Place of birth: Brazil
- Height: 1.79 m (5 ft 10 1/2 in)
- Position: Defender

Senior career*
Years	Team	Apps	(Gls)
1991–1995	Matsubara		
1998–2000	Cerezo Osaka	65	(0)
2003	Sagan Tosu	8	(0)
2004	SC Tottori	11	(1)
- * Club domestic league appearances and goals

Pericles de Oliveira Ramos (born 2 January 1975) is a former Brazilian football player.

== Club statistics ==
Club performance			League		Cup		League Cup		Total	
Season	Club	League	Apps	Goals	Apps	Goals	Apps	Goals	Apps	Goals
Japan			League		Emperor's Cup		J.League Cup		Total	
1998	Cerezo Osaka	J1 League	16	0	1	0	0	0	17	0
1999	Cerezo Osaka	J1 League	29	0	2	0	3	0	34	0
2000	Cerezo Osaka	J1 League	10	0	2	0	1	0	13	0
2003	Sagan Tosu	J2 League	8	0	0	0	-		8	0
2004	SC Tottori	Football League	11	1	2	0	-		13	1
Total			74	1	7	0	4	0	85	1
