= Katsuhiro Suzuki (footballer) =

Japanese footballer

Katsuhiro Suzuki 鈴木 勝大
Personal information
- Full name: Katsuhiro Suzuki
- Date of birth: November 26, 1977 (age 48)
- Place of birth: Yokosuka, Kanagawa, Japan
- Height: 1.74 m (5 ft 8 1/2 in)
- Position: Midfielder

Youth career
- 1993–1995: Toko Gakuen High School
- 1996–1999: Kokushikan University

Senior career*
Years	Team	Apps	(Gls)
2000	Avispa Fukuoka	2	(0)
2001–2004	Sagan Tosu	94	(1)
2004	Volca Kagoshima		
2005–2006	Rosso Kumamoto	33	(0)
Total		129	(1)
- * Club domestic league appearances and goals

Katsuhiro Suzuki (鈴木 勝大, Suzuki Katsuhiro; born November 26, 1977) is a former Japanese football player.

== Playing career ==
Suzuki was born in Yokosuka on November 26, 1977. After graduating from Kokushikan University, he joined J1 League club Avispa Fukuoka in 2000. However he could hardly play in the match. In 2001, he moved to J2 League club Sagan Tosu. He played many matches as midfielder from 2001 and became a regular player right midfielder and right side back in 2003. However he could hardly play in the match in 2004. In July 2004, he moved to Regional Leagues club Volca Kagoshima. In 2005, he moved to Regional Leagues club Rosso Kumamoto. He played many matches and the club was promoted to Japan Football League. He retired end of 2006 season.

== Club statistics ==
Club performance			League		Cup		League Cup		Total	
Season	Club	League	Apps	Goals	Apps	Goals	Apps	Goals	Apps	Goals
Japan			League		Emperor's Cup		J.League Cup		Total	
1998	Kokushikan University	Football League	22	2	2	2	-		24	4
1999	Kokushikan University	Football League	4	1	2	1	-		6	2
2000	Avispa Fukuoka	J1 League	2	0	0	0	1	0	3	0
2001	Sagan Tosu	J2 League	23	1	4	0	2	0	29	1
2002	Sagan Tosu	J2 League	27	0	3	0	-		30	0
2003	Sagan Tosu	J2 League	40	0	1	0	-		41	0
2004	Sagan Tosu	J2 League	4	0	0	0	-		4	0
2004	Volca Kagoshima	Regional Leagues								
2005	Rosso Kumamoto	Regional Leagues	14	0			-		14	0
2006	Rosso Kumamoto	Football League	19	0			-		19	0
Career total			155	4	12	3	3	0	170	7
