= Jun Ideguchi =

Japanese footballer

Jun Ideguchi 井手口 純
Personal information
- Full name: Jun Ideguchi
- Date of birth: May 14, 1979 (age 47)
- Place of birth: Toshima, Tokyo, Japan
- Height: 1.80 m (5 ft 11 in)
- Position: Defender

Youth career
- 1995–1997: Toko Gakuen High School

Senior career*
Years	Team	Apps	(Gls)
1998–2002	Yokohama F. Marinos	2	(0)
1999	→Consadole Sapporo (loan)	1	(0)
2001	→Shonan Bellmare (loan)	29	(1)
2002	Sanfrecce Hiroshima	7	(0)
2003–2005	Sagan Tosu	59	(2)
2006	Tokushima Vortis	27	(1)
Total		125	(4)
Medal record
Yokohama F. Marinos
Runner-up	J1 League	2000
Runner-up	J1 League	2002
- * Club domestic league appearances and goals

Jun Ideguchi (井手口 純, Ideguchi Jun; born May 14, 1979) is a former Japanese football player.

== Club career ==
Ideguchi was born in Toshima, Tokyo on May 14, 1979. After graduating from high school, he joined the Yokohama Marinos (later Yokohama F. Marinos) in 1998. Although he played for the club until 2002, he did not play as much as Japan national team defenders Masami Ihara, Norio Omura, and Naoki Matsuda. He also played for Consadole Sapporo (1999), Shonan Bellmare (2001), and Sanfrecce Hiroshima (2002). In 2003, he moved to Sagan Tosu. He played many matches at Sagan. He moved to Tokushima Vortis in 2006. He retired at the end of the 2006 season.

== National team career ==
In August 1995, Ideguchi was selected Japan U-17 national team for 1995 U-17 World Championship, but he did not play in the match.

== Career statistics ==
Appearances and goals by club, season and competition
Club	Season	League			Emperor's Cup		J.League Cup		Total	
Club	Season	Division	Apps	Goals	Apps	Goals	Apps	Goals	Apps	Goals
Yokohama Marinos	1998	J1 League	0	0	0	0	0	0	0	0
Yokohama F. Marinos	1999	J1 League	2	0	0	0	2	0	4	0
Consadole Sapporo	1999	J2 League	1	0	3	1	0	0	4	1
Yokohama F. Marinos	2000	J1 League	0	0	0	0	0	0	0	0
Shonan Bellmare	2001	J2 League	29	1	2	0	2	0	33	1
Yokohama F. Marinos	2002	J1 League	0	0	0	0	2	0	2	0
Sanfrecce Hiroshima	2002	J1 League	7	0	0	0	0	0	7	0
Sagan Tosu	2003	J2 League	11	1	0	0	—		11	1
Sagan Tosu	2004	J2 League	18	0	1	0	—		19	0
Sagan Tosu	2005	J2 League	30	1	2	0	—		32	1
Tokushima Vortis	2006	J2 League	27	1	2	0	—		29	1
Career total			125	4	10	1	6	0	141	5
