= Jōji Hashiguchi =

Japanese photographer

Jōji Hashiguchi (橋口 譲二, Hashiguchi Jōji; born 1949) is a Japanese photographer.

== Publications ==
- We Have No Place to Be. Soshisha, 1982.
  - Expanded edition. Session, 2020. With an essay by Yoshitomo Nara.
- Seventeen's Map. Bungeishunju, 1988.
- Zoo. Joho Center Shuppan kyoku, 1989.
- Father. Bungeishunju, 1990.
- Berlin. Ota Shuppan, 1992.
- Couple. Bungeishunju, 1992.
- Work 1991-1995. Media Factory, 1996.
- Children's Time. Shogakukan, 1999.
- Dream. Media Factory, 1997.
- Freedom 1981-1989. Kadokawa Shoten, 1998.
- Seventeen 2001-2006. Iwanami Shoten, 2008.
- Hof Memories of Berlin. Iwanami Shoten, 2011.
