= 2014 Grulla Morioka season =

Grulla Morioka
2014 season
- Manager: Naoki Naruo
- Stadium: Morioka Minami Park Stadium
- J3 League: 5th
- Highest home attendance: 3,048
- Lowest home attendance: 741
- Average home league attendance: 1,522

2014 Grulla Morioka season.

Pos	Team	Pld	W	D	L	GF	GA	GD	Pts
3	Machida Zelvia	33	20	8	5	59	22	+37	68
4	Gainare Tottori	33	14	11	8	34	25	+9	53
5	Grulla Morioka	33	12	9	12	43	39	+4	45
6	SC Sagamihara	33	12	7	14	44	48	−4	43
7	Fukushima United	33	9	9	15	30	38	−8	36

Source: J.League
Rules for classification: 1) Points; 2) Goal differential; 3) Goals scored; 4) Head-to-head results; 5) Disciplinary points; 6) Draw.

== J3 League ==
Match	Date	Team	Score	Team	Venue	Attendance
1	2014.03.09	Gainare Tottori	0-0	Grulla Morioka	Tottori Bank Bird Stadium	3,962
2	2014.03.16	Fukushima United FC	0-2	Grulla Morioka	Toho Stadium	2,053
3	2014.03.23	Grulla Morioka	6-1	J.League U-22 Selection	Morioka Minami Park Stadium	3,048
4	2014.03.30	FC Ryukyu	0-1	Grulla Morioka	Okinawa Athletic Park Stadium	863
5	2014.04.06	Grulla Morioka	1-4	FC Machida Zelvia	Morioka Minami Park Stadium	1,405
6	2014.04.13	Blaublitz Akita	2-1	Grulla Morioka	Akita Yabase Playing Field	1,771
7	2014.04.20	Grulla Morioka	0-0	AC Nagano Parceiro	Morioka Minami Park Stadium	1,200
8	2014.04.26	Zweigen Kanazawa	2-0	Grulla Morioka	Ishikawa Athletics Stadium	1,514
9	2014.04.29	Grulla Morioka	4-1	Fujieda MYFC	Morioka Minami Park Stadium	1,004
10	2014.05.04	Grulla Morioka	2-3	SC Sagamihara	Morioka Minami Park Stadium	1,763
11	2014.05.10	Grulla Morioka	3-0	YSCC Yokohama	Morioka Minami Park Stadium	1,201
12	2014.05.18	FC Machida Zelvia	1-1	Grulla Morioka	Machida Stadium	3,049
13	2014.05.25	Grulla Morioka	1-2	Fukushima United FC	Morioka Minami Park Stadium	1,351
14	2014.06.01	Grulla Morioka	3-0	Blaublitz Akita	Morioka Minami Park Stadium	1,430
15	2014.06.08	Grulla Morioka	0-1	Zweigen Kanazawa	Morioka Minami Park Stadium	1,078
16	2014.06.15	AC Nagano Parceiro	3-2	Grulla Morioka	Saku Athletic Stadium	2,308
17	2014.06.22	Grulla Morioka	3-1	J.League U-22 Selection	Morioka Minami Park Stadium	1,933
18	2014.07.20	Fujieda MYFC	0-1	Grulla Morioka	Fujieda Soccer Stadium	3,302
19	2014.07.27	Grulla Morioka	1-1	YSCC Yokohama	Morioka Minami Park Stadium	1,055
20	2014.08.03	Grulla Morioka	2-1	FC Ryukyu	Morioka Minami Park Stadium	741
21	2014.08.10	SC Sagamihara	0-0	Grulla Morioka	Sagamihara Gion Stadium	1,231
25	2014.08.17	Grulla Morioka	2-1	J.League U-22 Selection	Morioka Minami Park Stadium	817
22	2014.08.24	Gainare Tottori	1-0	Grulla Morioka	Chubu Yajin Stadium	5,063
23	2014.08.31	Grulla Morioka	0-2	Zweigen Kanazawa	Morioka Minami Park Stadium	1,526
24	2014.09.05	YSCC Yokohama	0-0	Grulla Morioka	Yokohama Mitsuzawa Athletic Stadium	512
26	2014.09.21	Fukushima United FC	0-1	Grulla Morioka	Iwaki Greenfield Stadium	1,589
27	2014.10.05	Grulla Morioka	0-2	Fujieda MYFC	Morioka Minami Park Stadium	1,625
29	2014.10.19	Grulla Morioka	1-1	FC Machida Zelvia	Morioka Minami Park Stadium	1,568
28	2014.10.25	FC Ryukyu	1-1	Grulla Morioka	Okinawa City Stadium	520
30	2014.11.02	Blaublitz Akita	1-3	Grulla Morioka	Akigin Stadium	2,488
31	2014.11.09	Grulla Morioka	0-3	SC Sagamihara	Morioka Minami Park Stadium	1,623
32	2014.11.16	AC Nagano Parceiro	3-0	Grulla Morioka	Nagano Athletic Stadium	5,639
33	2014.11.23	Grulla Morioka	1-1	Gainare Tottori	Morioka Minami Park Stadium	3,035
