= Daisuke Yoneyama =

Japanese footballer (born 1982)

Daisuke Yoneyama 米山 大輔
Personal information
- Full name: Daisuke Yoneyama
- Date of birth: June 10, 1982 (age 44)
- Place of birth: Kuwana, Mie, Japan
- Height: 1.70 m (5 ft 7 in)
- Position: Midfielder

Youth career
- 1998–2000: Akatsuki High School

Senior career*
Years	Team	Apps	(Gls)
2001–2005	Cerezo Osaka	11	(2)
2003	→Sagan Tosu (loan)	23	(2)
2005–2006	Rosso Kumamoto	19	(4)
2007–2008	Zweigen Kanazawa	26	(10)
Total		79	(18)
Medal record
Cerezo Osaka
Runner-up	Emperor's Cup	2001
- * Club domestic league appearances and goals

Daisuke Yoneyama (米山 大輔, Yoneyama Daisuke; born June 10, 1982) is a former Japanese football player.

== Playing career ==
Yoneyama was born in Kuwana on June 10, 1982. After graduating from high school, he joined J1 League club Cerezo Osaka in 2001. On September 29, he debuted as substitute forward against Júbilo Iwata. However Cerezo was relegated J2 League end of 2001 season and he could only play this match until 2002. In 2003, he moved to J2 club Sagan Tosu on loan. He played many matches as offensive midfielder. In 2004, he returned to Cerezo Osaka which was returned to J1 from 2004. Although he played several matches, he could not play many matches until 2005. In October 2005, he moved to Regional Leagues club Rosso Kumamoto. Rosso was promoted to Japan Football League end of 2005 season. In 2006, he played many matches. In 2007, he moved to Regional Leagues club Zweigen Kanazawa. He played as regular player in 2 seasons. He retired end of 2008 season.

== Career statistics ==
Appearances and goals by club, season and competition
Club	Season	League			Emperor's Cup		J.League Cup		Total	
Club	Season	Division	Apps	Goals	Apps	Goals	Apps	Goals	Apps	Goals
Cerezo Osaka	2001	J1 League	1	0	0	0	0	0	1	0
Cerezo Osaka	2002	J2 League	0	0	0	0	—		0	0
Sagan Tosu	2003	J2 League	23	2	0	0	—		23	2
Cerezo Osaka	2004	J1 League	3	1	0	0	2	0	5	1
Cerezo Osaka	2005	J1 League	7	1	0	0	3	0	10	0
Rosso Kumamoto	2005	Regional Leagues	0	0	0	0	—		0	0
Rosso Kumamoto	2006	Football League	19	4	0	0	—		19	4
Zweigen Kanazawa	2007	Regional Leagues	13	8	3	0	—		16	8
Zweigen Kanazawa	2008	Regional Leagues	13	2	2	0	—		15	2
Career total			79	18	5	0	5	0	89	18
