= Masaru Hashiguchi =

Japanese footballer

Masaru Hashiguchi 橋口 勝
Personal information
- Full name: Masaru Hashiguchi
- Date of birth: May 21, 1974 (age 52)
- Place of birth: Amagasaki, Japan
- Height: 1.77 m (5 ft 9 1/2 in)
- Position: Defender

Youth career
- 1990–1992: Daisho Gakuen High School
- 1993–1996: Hannan University

Senior career*
Years	Team	Apps	(Gls)
1997–1999	Cerezo Osaka	25	(1)
2000	Avispa Fukuoka	0	(0)
Total		25	(1)
- * Club domestic league appearances and goals

Masaru Hashiguchi (橋口 勝, Hashiguchi Masaru; born May 21, 1974) is a former Japanese football player.

== Playing career ==
Hashiguchi was born in Amagasaki on May 21, 1974. After graduating from Hannan University, he joined J1 League club Cerezo Osaka in 1997. He played many matches as left side back in 1998. However he could hardly play in the match in 1999. In 2000, he moved to Avispa Fukuoka. However he could hardly play in the match and retired at the end of the 2000 season.

== Career statistics ==
Appearances and goals by club, season and competition
Club	Season	League			Emperor's Cup		J.League Cup		Total	
Club	Season	Division	Apps	Goals	Apps	Goals	Apps	Goals	Apps	Goals
Cerezo Osaka	1997	J1 League	0	0			0	0	0	0
Cerezo Osaka	1998	J1 League	21	0			3	1	24	1
Cerezo Osaka	1999	J1 League	4	1			0	0	4	1
Avispa Fukuoka	2000	J1 League	0	0			2	0	2	0
Career total			25	1	0	0	5	1	30	2
