= Saga Stadium =

Stadium in Japan

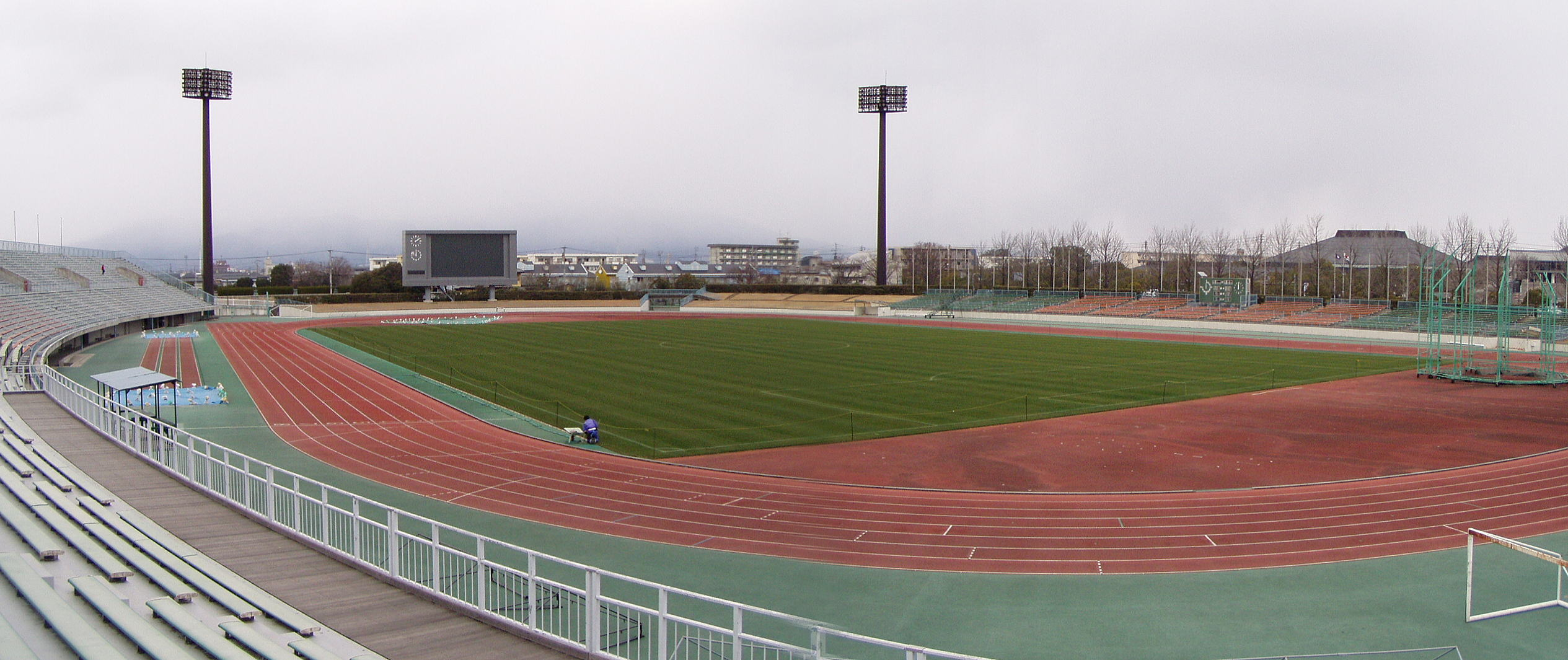
- Interactive map of Saga Stadium
- Location: Saga, Japan
- Coordinates: 33.276709°N 130.291693°E
- Capacity: 17,000

Construction
- Groundbreaking: 1968
- Opened: 1970

Saga Stadium (佐賀県総合運動場陸上競技場) is a multi-purpose stadium in Saga, Japan. It is currently used mostly for football matches. The stadium was originally opened in 1970 and has a capacity of 17,000 spectators.

== History ==
It was built to use by the National Sports Festival of Japan held in Saga-ken in 1976. Tosu Futures (It dismissed in 1997) of Japan Football League used for 3 years from 1994 as a temporary home ground. After 1997, Sagan Tosu is holding a home game irregularly.
