= Ekimae Real Estate Stadium =

Japanese football stadium

- 駅前不動産スタジアム
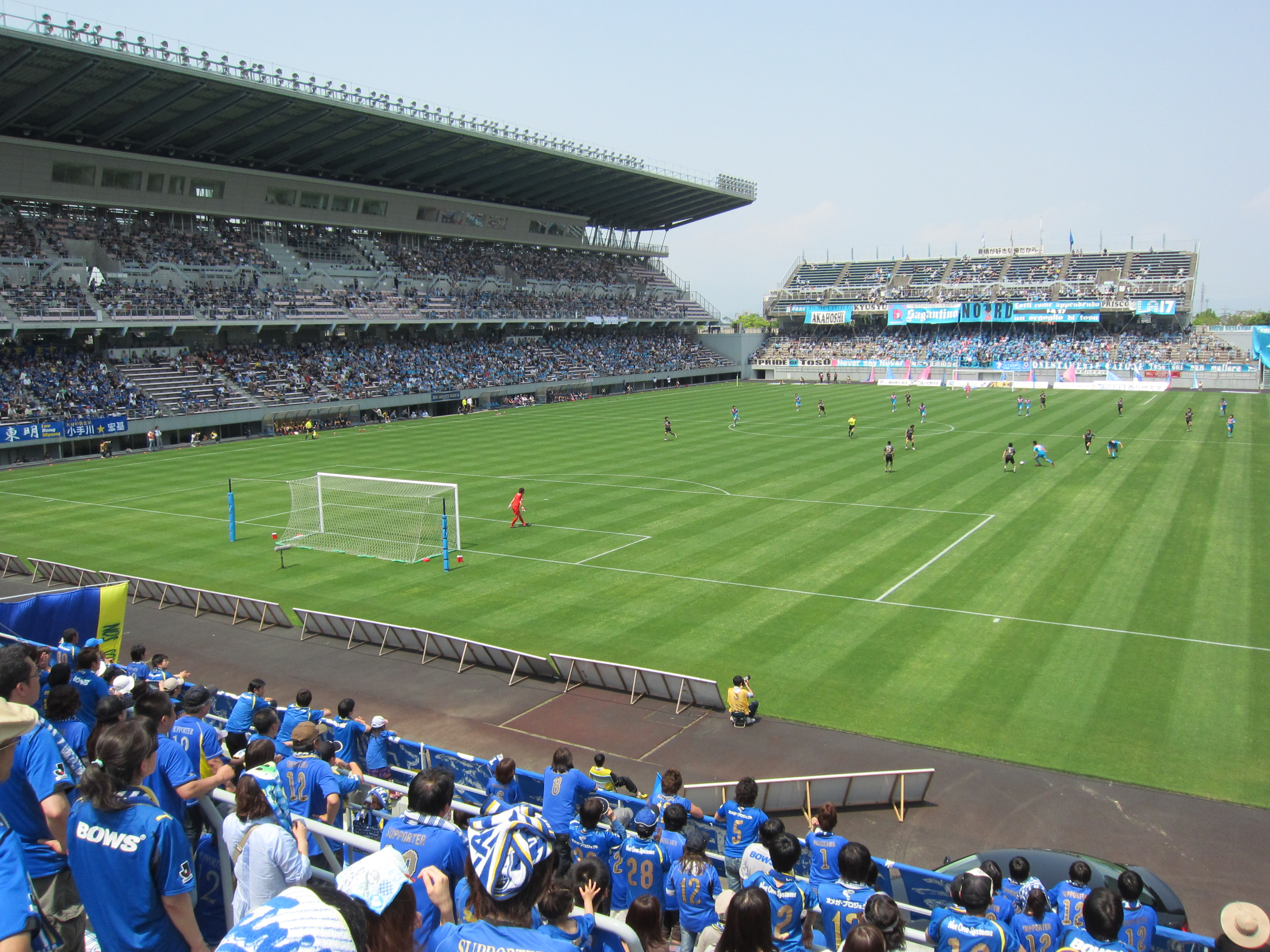
- Interactive map of Ekimae Real Estate Stadium
- Former names: Tosu Stadium (1996–2007); Best Amenity Stadium (2008–2019)
- Location: 812 Kyomachi, Tosu, Saga, Japan
- Coordinates: 33°22′19″N 130°31′13″E
- Owner: City of Tosu
- Operator: City of Tosu
- Capacity: 24,130
- Type: Stadium
- Surface: Grass
- Scoreboard: Panasonic display 5.952×8.064m(47.99 m^{2})
- Field size: 125 m × 78 m
- Field shape: Square
- Public transit: JR Kyushu: Kagoshima Main Line and Nagasaki Main Line at Tosu

Construction
- Opened: June 1996
- Cost: ¥6.7 billion
- Architect: JGC Corporation
- Main contractor: Obayashi Corporation

Tenant
- Sagan Tosu (1997–present)

Ekimae Real Estate Stadium (駅前不動産スタジアム, Ekimae Fudōsan Sutajiamu) is a football stadium in Tosu, Saga, Japan. It serves as a home ground of J2 League club Sagan Tosu. The stadium holds 24,130 people and was built in 1996.

== History ==
The stadium was built in the site of Tosu rail yard and Tosu classification yard in accord with the JR Kyushu's Tosu Station.

It was formerly known as Tosu Stadium (鳥栖スタジアム, Tosu Sutajiamu) then it was called Best Amenity Stadium from January 2008 to January 2019 for the naming rights. Ekimae Real Estate Holdings Co., Ltd., a real estate company in Kurume City, won the naming rights agreement from Tosu City, then renamed the stadium as Ekimae Real Estate Stadium (駅前不動産スタジアム, Ekimae Fudōsan Sutajiamu) from 1 February 2019.

== Access ==
It is three minutes' walk from Tosu Station.
