= Kōji Nakata =

Japanese footballer

Kōji Nakata 中田 浩二
Personal information
- Full name: Kōji Nakata
- Date of birth: 9 July 1979 (age 47)
- Place of birth: Otsu, Shiga, Japan
- Height: 1.82 m (6 ft 0 in)
- Positions: Defender; midfielder

Youth career
- 1995–1997: Teikyo High School

Senior career*
Years	Team	Apps	(Gls)
1998–2004	Kashima Antlers	144	(27)
2005–2006	Olympique Marseille	9	(0)
2006–2008	Basel	62	(3)
2008–2014	Kashima Antlers	122	(6)
Total		337	(36)

International career
1999	Japan U20	7	(0)
2000	Japan U23	3	(0)
2000–2007	Japan	57	(2)
Medal record
Men's football
Representing Japan
AFC Asian Cup
Winner	2004 China
FIFA Confederations Cup
Runner-up	2001 Korea/Japan
- * Club domestic league appearances and goals

Kōji Nakata (中田 浩二, Nakata Kōji; born 9 July 1979) is a Japanese former professional footballer who played as a defender and midfielder. At international level, he represented the Japan national team at both the 2002, and the 2006 FIFA World Cup.

== Club career ==
=== Kashima Antlers ===
The 'other Nakata', as he is known to most non-Japanese fans, is a left-footed midfielder. A versatile player, Nakata has established himself as a defensive midfielders for Japan.

Nakata was born in Otsu on 9 July 1979. After graduating from high school, he joined Kashima Antlers in 1998. Japan national team players Masashi Motoyama, Mitsuo Ogasawara and Hitoshi Sogahata were Nakata's contemporaries. He debuted as defensive midfielder in first season and the club won the championship in the 1998 J1 League. From 2000, he became a regular player and constituted midfielder with Yasuto Honda, Bismarck, Motoyama and Ogasawara. In 2000, the club won all three major title in Japan J1 League, J.League Cup and Emperor's Cup. In 2001, the club won J1 League and he was also elected Best Eleven. The club also won 2002 J.League Cup.

=== Olympique Marseille ===
Nakata moved from Japanese Kashima Antlers to France at the start of 2005, when former Japan national team manager Philippe Troussier, then the Olympique de Marseille coach, signed him in a deal. After an understandably unhappy season in France (Troussier was sacked just a few months later), the frozen-out Nakata jumped at the chance to leave and early 2006 he moved to Switzerland's top team FC Basel.

=== Basel ===
On 1 February 2006, it was announced that FC Basel had signed Nakata on a two-and-a-half-year contract. He was the first Japanese player to sign for a Swiss top-flight club. He joined Basel's first team during the winter break of their 2005–06 season under head coach Christian Gross, who was in his seventh season with the club in that position. After playing in two test games, Nakata played his domestic league debut for the club in the home game in the St. Jakob-Park on 19 February as Basel played a 1–1 draw with Schaffhausen. Just one week later he scored his first goal for his new club on 26 February, also in a home game, it was the equaliser after Basel fell behind and eventually the team won 2–1 against Yverdon-Sport. Basel had started the season well and led the championship right until the last day of the league campaign. On the final day of the league season Basel played at home against Zürich. A last-minute goal from Zürich's Iulian Filipescu meant the final score was 1-2 in favour of the away team and it gave FCZ their first national championship since 1980–81. The title for Basel was lost on goal difference.

FC Basel's European campaign started in the first qualifying stage of the 2006–07 UEFA Cup, here they beat Kazakhi side FC Tobol 3–1 on aggregate. In the second qualifying round they were drawn against FC Vaduz from Liechtenstein, narrowly progressing on the away goals rule after a 2–2 aggregate draw. In the first round Basel won 7–2 on aggregate against FK Rabotnički to qualified for the group stage. Here Basel played their first match at home against Feyenoord, this ended in a 1–1 draw. Their second was away and FCB lost 3–0 against Blackburn Rovers. At home against AS Nancy the match was drawn 2–2 and the final game ended with a 3–1 defeat against Wisła Kraków. Basel ended the group stage in last position in the table and were eliminated. Nakata played in nine of these ten matches. Nakata scored another goal for the team on 15 October 2006 in the away game in the Stadion Breite, but it could not help the team, as Basel were defeated 4–2 by Schaffhausen. At the end of the 2006–07 Super League season Basel were runners-up, one point behind championship winners Zürich. Nakata played in 34 of the 36 league matches. In the Swiss Cup Basel advanced to the final, beating FC Liestal in the first round, Lugano, FC Baulmes, Aarau and Wil in the semi-final. In the final they played Luzern and won this 1–0 thanks to a penalty goal in the third minute of added time. Nakata played in five of the six cup games.

Basel played in the 2007–08 UEFA Cup. Winning both matches in the qualification round and both matches in the play-off round, they team advanced to the group stage, which they ended undefeated in second position, after playing 1–0 at home against Stade Rennes, 0–0 away against Dinamo Zagreb, 1–0 at home against Brann and 1–1 away against Hamburger SV, to continue the knockout stage. But then they were eliminated here by Sporting CP. Nakata played in five of these European games. At the end of the 2007–08 season he won the Double with the club. They won the League Championship title with four points advantage over second placed Young Boys. Nakata played in 18 of the 36 league games. In the Swiss Cup via FC Léchelles, SC Binningen, Grasshopper Club, Stade Nyonnais and in the semi-final Thun, Basel advanced to the final, and winning this 4–1 against AC Bellinzona they won the competition. Nakata played in three of the six games, including the final.

Nakata left Basel at the end of the season. During his time with the club, he played a total of 112 games for Basel scoring a total of six goals. 62 of these games were in the Swiss Super League, eight in the Swiss Cup, 14 in the UEFA Cup and 28 were friendly games. He scored three goals in the domestic league, two in the cup and the other two were scored during the test games.

=== Kashima Antlers ===
Nakata returned to Kashima Antlers in July 2008. He played at many defensive position, defensive midfielder, left side-back and center-back. The club won the champions 2008, 2009 J1 League, 2010 Emperor's Cup, 2011 and 2012 J.League Cup. He retired end of 2014 season.

== International career ==
Although Nakata played as defensive midfielder at the club, he played as left-back of three backs defense at U20, U23 and senior national team under manager Philippe Troussier.

In April 1999, Nakata played for Japan U20 at 1999 World Youth Championship. He played all 7 matches with defender Kazuki Teshima and Shigeki Tsujimoto, and Japan won the 2nd place.

On 5 February 2000, Nakata debuted for Japan national team against Mexico. In September, he was elected U23 Japan for 2000 Summer Olympics. Although he played as regular player, he was hurt in third match against Brazil and he could not play after the match.

In 2001 and 2002, Nakata played all matches for Japan including 2001 Confederations Cup and 2002 World Cup. At Confederations Cup, Japan won the 2nd place. At 2002 World Cup, he played full-time all 4 matches.

After 2002 World Cup, Nakata played as defensive midfielder under new manager Zico. Although his opportunity to play decreased, he was elected Japan for many competition, 2003, 2005 Confederations Cup, 2004 Asian Cup and 2006 World Cup. At 2004 Asian Cup, he played 4 matches and scored 2 goals in semifinal and final, including a handball in the final, and Japan won the champions. He played 57 games and scored 2 goals for Japan until 2007.

== Personal life ==
Nakata is married to actress, Nao Nagasawa, since 22 February 2014. The couple have 3 children.

== Career statistics ==
=== Club ===
Appearances and goals by club, season and competition
Club	Season	League		National cup		League cup		Continental		Total	
Club	Season	Apps	Goals	Apps	Goals	Apps	Goals	Apps	Goals	Apps	Goals
Kashima Antlers	1998	5	1	0	0	0	0	–		5	1
Kashima Antlers	1999	17	4	2	0	1	0	–		20	4
Kashima Antlers	2000	29	4	5	2	2	2			36	8
Kashima Antlers	2001	25	8	3	1	6	0	–		34	9
Kashima Antlers	2002	29	6	5	0	3	0			37	6
Kashima Antlers	2003	18	3	–		2	2	3	0	23	5
Kashima Antlers	2004	21	1	3	2	2	0	–		26	3
Kashima Antlers	Total	144	27	18	5	16	4	3	0	181	36
Marseille	2004–05	5	0	–		–		–		5	0
Marseille	2005–06	4	0	–		1	0	5	0	10	0
Marseille	Total	9	0	0	0	1	0	5	0	15	0
Basel	2005–06	10	1	–		–		–		10	1
Basel	2006–07	34	1	5	0	–		9	0	48	1
Basel	2007–08	18	1	2	1	–		5	0	25	2
Basel	Total	62	3	7	1	0	0	14	0	83	4
Kashima Antlers	2008	9	0	–		1	0	2	0	12	0
Kashima Antlers	2009	22	1	4	0	1	0	2	0	29	1
Kashima Antlers	2010	32	3	6	1	1	0	6	2	45	6
Kashima Antlers	2011	26	2	1	0	3	0	6	1	36	3
Kashima Antlers	2012	5	0	0	0	2	0	–		7	0
Kashima Antlers	2013	25	0	2	0	6	0	–		33	0
Kashima Antlers	2014	3	0	0	0	1	0	–		4	0
Kashima Antlers	Total	122	6	13	1	15	0	16	3	166	10
Career total		337	36	38	7	32	4	38	3	445	50

=== International ===
Appearances and goals by national team and year
National team	Year	Apps	Goals
Japan	2000	7	0
Japan	2001	13	0
Japan	2002	13	0
Japan	2003	7	0
Japan	2004	6	2
Japan	2005	8	0
Japan	2006	2	0
Japan	2007	1	0
Total		57	2

Scores and results list Japan's goal tally first, score column indicates score after each Nakata goal.

List of international goals scored by Kōji Nakata
No.	Date	Venue	Opponent	Score	Result	Competition
1	3 August 2004	Shandong Provincial Stadium, Jinan, China	Bahrain		4–3	2004 AFC Asian Cup
2	7 August 2004	Workers' Stadium, Beijing, China	China		3–1	2004 AFC Asian Cup Final

== Honours ==
Kashima Antlers

- A3 Champions Cup: 2003
- J1 League: 1998, 2000, 2001, 2008, 2009
- Emperor's Cup: 2000, 2010
- J.League Cup: 2000, 2002, 2011, 2012
- Suruga Bank Championship: 2012, 2013

Marseille

- UEFA Intertoto Cup: 2005

FC Basel

- Swiss Super League: 2007–08
- Swiss Cup: 2006–07, 2007–08
- Uhren Cup: 2006

Japan

- AFC Asian Cup: 2004
- FIFA Confederations Cup runner-up: 2001

Individual

- J. League Best Eleven: 2001
- J. League Cup MVP: 2000
