= Kenji Haneda =

Japanese footballer (born 1981)

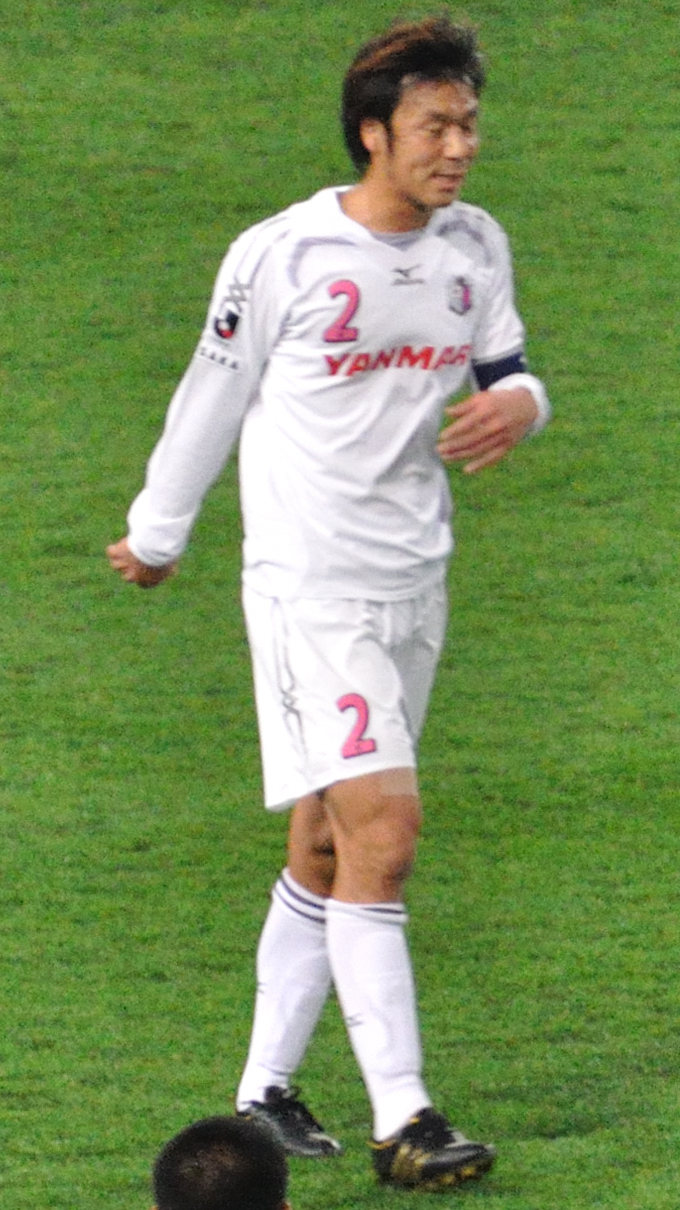

Personal information
- Full name: Kenji Haneda
- Date of birth: December 1, 1981 (age 44)
- Place of birth: Ichikawa, Chiba, Japan
- Height: 1.80 m (5 ft 11 in)
- Positions: Midfielder; defender

Youth career
- 1997–1999: Funabashi High School

Senior career*
Years	Team	Apps	(Gls)
2000–2006	Kashima Antlers	19	(2)
2007–2010	Cerezo Osaka	127	(2)
2011–2012	Vissel Kobe	6	(0)
Total		152	(4)

International career
2001	Japan U-20	3	(0)
Medal record
Kashima Antlers
Winner	J1 League	2000
Winner	J1 League	2001
Winner	J.League Cup	2000
Winner	J.League Cup	2002
Runner-up	J.League Cup	2003
Runner-up	J.League Cup	2006
Winner	Emperor's Cup	2000
Runner-up	Emperor's Cup	2002
Representing Japan
AFC U-19 Championship
Silver medal – second place	2000 Iran
- * Club domestic league appearances and goals

Kenji Haneda (羽田 憲司, Haneda Kenji; born December 1, 1981) is a former Japanese football player he is the current assistant coach of Japan U23.

== Club career ==
Haneda was born in Ichikawa on December 1, 1981. After graduating from high school, he joined Kashima Antlers as center back in 2000. However he could hardly play in the match due to injuries. In addition, there were many center backs Yutaka Akita, Go Oiwa, Daiki Iwamasa and so on in the club. He moved to J2 League club Cerezo Osaka in 2007. He played many matches as defensive midfielder. In 2009, he played as regular player and the club was promoted to J1 League. He moved to Vissel Kobe in 2011. However he could hardly play in the match due to injury. He retired at the end of the 2012 season.

== National team career ==
In June 2001, Haneda was selected Japan U-20 national team for 2001 World Youth Championship and he served captain. At this tournament, he played full time in all 3 matches as center back.

== Club statistics ==
Club performance			League		Cup		League Cup		Total	
Season	Club	League	Apps	Goals	Apps	Goals	Apps	Goals	Apps	Goals
Japan			League		Emperor's Cup		J.League Cup		Total	
2000	Kashima Antlers	J1 League	3	0	3	0	5	0	11	0
2001	Kashima Antlers	J1 League	6	1	0	0	0	0	6	1
2002	Kashima Antlers	J1 League	0	0	0	0	0	0	0	0
2003	Kashima Antlers	J1 League	0	0	0	0	0	0	0	0
2004	Kashima Antlers	J1 League	0	0	0	0	0	0	0	0
2005	Kashima Antlers	J1 League	6	1	0	0	2	0	8	1
2006	Kashima Antlers	J1 League	4	0	0	0	5	0	9	0
2007	Cerezo Osaka	J2 League	25	0	2	0	-		27	0
2008	Cerezo Osaka	J2 League	32	1	2	0	-		34	1
2009	Cerezo Osaka	J2 League	50	1	1	0	-		51	1
2010	Cerezo Osaka	J1 League	20	0	2	0	5	0	27	0
2011	Vissel Kobe	J1 League	6	0	1	0	0	0	7	0
2012	Vissel Kobe	J1 League	0	0	0	0	0	0	0	0
Career total			152	4	11	0	17	0	180	4

== National team statistics ==
Year	Competition	Category	Appearances		Goals	Team record
Year	Competition	Category	Start	Sub	Goals	Team record
2000	2000 AFC Youth Championship	U-19				2nd place
2001	2001 FIFA World Youth Championship	U-20	3	0	0	Group Stage
