= Tomohiko Ikeuchi =

Japanese footballer

Tomohiko Ikeuchi 池内 友彦
Personal information
- Full name: Tomohiko Ikeuchi
- Date of birth: November 1, 1977 (age 49)
- Place of birth: Tobetsu, Hokkaido, Japan
- Height: 1.81 m (5 ft 11 1/2 in)
- Position: Defender

Youth career
- 1993–1995: Muroran Otani High School

Senior career*
Years	Team	Apps	(Gls)
1996–2004	Kashima Antlers	37	(1)
1998	→CFZ (loan)		
1999–2000	→Consadole Sapporo (loan)	19	(2)
2005–2008	Consadole Sapporo	107	(18)
Total		163	(21)
Medal record
Kashima Antlers
Winner	J1 League	1996
Winner	J1 League	1998
Winner	J1 League	2001
Runner-up	J1 League	1997
Winner	J.League Cup	1997
Winner	J.League Cup	2002
Runner-up	J.League Cup	2003
Winner	Emperor's Cup	1997
Runner-up	Emperor's Cup	2002
- * Club domestic league appearances and goals

Tomohiko Ikeuchi (池内 友彦, Ikeuchi Tomohiko; born November 1, 1977) is a former Japanese football player.

== Playing career ==
Ikeuchi was born in Tobetsu, Hokkaido on November 1, 1977. After graduating from high school, he joined the J1 League club Kashima Antlers in 1996. However, he did not actually play in any matches from then through 1998. In 1999, he was loaned to the J2 League club Consadole Sapporo. He played as a defensive midfielder and side back for two seasons and the club won the championship in 2000. In 2001, he returned to Kashima Antlers. He played as a center back and the club won the championship of the 2001 J1 League and the 2002 J.League Cup. However, he did not get as much playing time in 2004 as younger players Seiji Kaneko and Daiki Iwamasa. In 2005, he moved to the J2 club Consadole Sapporo again. He became a regular player as a left back of a three-back defense. In 2007, he played side back of a four-back defense and the club won the championship and was promoted to J1 in 2008. After playing regularly, he retired at the end of the 2008 season.

== Club statistics ==
Club performance			League		Cup		League Cup		Continental		Total	
Season	Club	League	Apps	Goals	Apps	Goals	Apps	Goals	Apps	Goals	Apps	Goals
Japan			League		Emperor's Cup		J.League Cup		Asia		Total	
1996	Kashima Antlers	J1 League	0	0	0	0	0	0	-		0	0
1997	Kashima Antlers	J1 League	0	0	0	0	0	0	-		0	0
1998	Kashima Antlers	J1 League	0	0	0	0	0	0	-		0	0
1999	Consadole Sapporo	J2 League	7	2	3	0	0	0	-		10	2
2000	Consadole Sapporo	J2 League	12	0	4	1	0	0	-		16	1
2001	Kashima Antlers	J1 League	8	0	3	0	3	0	-		14	0
2002	Kashima Antlers	J1 League	14	1	3	0	3	0	-		20	1
2003	Kashima Antlers	J1 League	10	0	0	0	2	0	1	0	13	0
2004	Kashima Antlers	J1 League	5	0	0	0	3	0	-		8	0
2005	Consadole Sapporo	J2 League	33	11	1	0	-		-		34	11
2006	Consadole Sapporo	J2 League	22	3	0	0	-		-		22	3
2007	Consadole Sapporo	J2 League	32	2	1	0	-		-		33	2
2008	Consadole Sapporo	J1 League	20	2	1	0	2	0	-		23	2
Total			163	21	16	1	13	0	1	0	192	22
