= 2003 Kashima Antlers season =

Kashima Antlers
2003 season
- Manager: Toninho Cerezo
- Stadium: Kashima Soccer Stadium
- J. League 1: 5th
- Emperor's Cup: Semifinals
- J. League Cup: Runners-up
- AFC Champions League: Group stage
- A3 Champions Cup: Winners
- Top goalscorer: Mitsuo Ogasawara (7); Tomoyuki Hirase (7)
Home colours	Away colours

2003 Kashima Antlers season

== Competitions ==
Competitions	Position
J. League 1	5th / 16 clubs
Emperor's Cup	Semifinals
J. League Cup	Runners-up

== Domestic results ==
=== J. League 1 ===
==== First stage ====
===== League table =====
Pos	Team	Pld	W	D	L	GF	GA	GD	Pts
6	Urawa Red Diamonds	15	7	3	5	25	23	+2	24
7	Nagoya Grampus Eight	15	5	8	2	19	16	+3	23
8	Kashima Antlers	15	7	2	6	23	21	+2	23
9	Kashiwa Reysol	15	6	3	6	19	19	0	21
10	Tokyo Verdy 1969	15	6	1	8	28	32	−4	19

Updated to match(es) played on August 2, 2003. Source: J. League Division 1
Rules for classification: 1) points; 2) goal difference; 3) number of goals scored.

===== Results summary =====
Overall								Home						Away					
Pld	W	D	L	GF	GA	GD	Pts	W	D	L	GF	GA	GD	W	D	L	GF	GA	GD
15	7	2	6	23	21	+2	23	4	1	3	15	12	+3	3	1	3	8	9	−1

Source: J. League Data Site

===== Result round by round =====
Round	1	2	3	4	5	6	7	8	9	10	11	12	13	14	15
Ground	H	A	A	H	H	A	H	A	H	A	H	A	H	H	A
Result	W	W	L	W	W	W	L	D	L	W	W	L	D	L	L
Position	2	2	4	3	1	1	2	4	6	3	2	5	5	5	8

Source: J. League Data Site
A = Away; H = Home; W = Win; D = Draw; L = Loss

===== Matches =====
22 March 2003 1	Kashima Antlers	3–1	Urawa Red Diamonds	Kashima
15:35	Akita (yellow card) 6'; Euller 20' (yellow card) 83'; Narahashi 41'; Fernando 87'	Report	Suzuki (yellow card) 22'; Yamada 73'	Stadium: Kashima Soccer Stadium; Attendance: 36,330; Referee: Toru Kamikawa

5 April 2003 2	Kashiwa Reysol	1–2	Kashima Antlers	Kashiwa
19:05	Márcio (yellow card) 1'; Ricardinho 17' (yellow card) 42'	Report	Fernando 49'; Aoki (yellow card) 51'; Ogasawara 62' (yellow card) 69'; Soma (yellow card) 78'; Honda (yellow card) 89'	Stadium: Kashiwanoha Stadium; Attendance: 11,070; Referee: Kiyoshi Ota

13 April 2003 3	Nagoya Grampus Eight	1–0	Kashima Antlers	Toyota
15:04	Vastić 78'	Report	Fernando (yellow card) 40'; Ōiwa (yellow card) 52'	Stadium: Toyota Stadium; Attendance: 23,429; Referee: Kazuhisa Osada

19 April 2003 4	Kashima Antlers	1–0	Tokyo Verdy 1969	Kashima
16:04	Fernando (yellow card) 36'; Ogasawara (yellow card) 51'; K. Nakata 70'	Report	Yamada (yellow card) 50'; Ramon (yellow card) 60'	Stadium: Kashima Soccer Stadium; Attendance: 16,931; Referee: Kazuhiro Matsumura

26 April 2003 5	Kashima Antlers	2–0	FC Tokyo	Kashima
16:03	Fernando 5' (yellow card) 15'; K. Nakata (yellow card) 50'; Narahashi (yellow card) 57'; Euller 89'	Report	Amaral (yellow card) 46'	Stadium: Kashima Soccer Stadium; Attendance: 14,960; Referee: Toru Kamikawa

29 April 2003 6	Gamba Osaka	1–2	Kashima Antlers	Osaka
19:04	Futagawa 9'; Hashimoto (yellow card) 12'; Miyamoto (yellow card) 32'	Report	Motoyama 22' (yellow card) 43'; K. Nakata (yellow card) 23'; Euller 89'	Stadium: Expo '70 Commemorative Stadium; Attendance: 16,146; Referee: Masayoshi Okada

5 May 2003 7	Kashima Antlers	1–3	Yokohama F. Marinos	Kashima
15:33	Yanagisawa 8'; Euller (yellow card) 12'; Ogasawara (yellow card) 28'	Report	Dutra (yellow card) 14'; Kubo 46', 66', 69'	Stadium: Kashima Soccer Stadium; Attendance: 34,066; Referee: Yoshitsugu Katayama

10 May 2003 8	Oita Trinita	1–1	Kashima Antlers	Ōita
19:04	Rodrigo 36'; Sandro (yellow card) 49'; Umeda (yellow card) 56'	Report	Hirase (yellow card) 72'; K. Nakata 78'; Claudecir (yellow card) 83'	Stadium: Oita Stadium; Attendance: 30,420; Referee: Toshimitsu Yoshida

17 May 2003 9	Kashima Antlers	0–2	JEF United Ichihara	Kashima
15:04	Yanagisawa (yellow card) 28'; Motoyama (yellow card) 66'	Report	Sandro (yellow card) 17' unknown 43' (o.g.); Choi Yong-soo 44'; Nakanishi (yellow card) 89'	Stadium: Kashima Soccer Stadium; Attendance: 19,420; Referee: Joji Kashihara

24 May 2003 10	Vegalta Sendai	0–2	Kashima Antlers	Rifu
15:04	Yahata (yellow card) 38'; I. Nakata (yellow card) 89'	Report	Aoki (yellow card) 30'; Motoyama 69'; Yanagisawa (yellow card) 73'; Claudecir 80'	Stadium: Miyagi Stadium; Attendance: 32,478; Referee: Toru Kamikawa

5 July 2003 11	Kashima Antlers	5–2	Júbilo Iwata	Kashima
19:05	Fernando 8', 13'; Ōiwa 16'; Yanagisawa (yellow card) 39' (goal) 44'; Euller 71'; Ogasawara (yellow card) 77'	Report	van Zwam (red card) 11'; Gral (yellow card) 33' (goal) 52'; Hattori (yellow card) 35'; Maeda (yellow card) 40' (goal) 50'; Nishi (yellow card) 54'; Fukunishi (yellow card) 74'	Stadium: Kashima Soccer Stadium; Attendance: 39,684; Referee: Masayoshi Okada

12 July 2003 12	Shimizu S-Pulse	2–0	Kashima Antlers	Shizuoka
19:00	Tuto 20', 63' (yellow card) 44'; Émerson (yellow card) 79'	Report	Ogasawara (yellow card) 44' (yellow-red card) 74'; Narahashi (yellow card) 47'; Fernando (yellow card) 89'	Stadium: Kusanagi Athletic Stadium; Attendance: 15,463; Referee: Kazuhiko Matsumura

19 July 2003 13	Kashima Antlers	3–3	Vissel Kobe	Kashima
19:04	Motoyama 24' (yellow card) 32'; Hirase 29'; Soma (yellow card) 30' (yellow-red card) 82'; Akita (yellow card) 39' (red card) 84'; Claudecir 53'	Report	Bando (yellow card) 42' (goal) 51'; Oséas 54', 60'; Tsuchiya (yellow card) 89'	Stadium: Kashima Soccer Stadium; Attendance: 15,468; Referee: Keiichi Sunakawa

27 July 2003 14	Kashima Antlers	0–1	Cerezo Osaka	Kashima
19:04	Fernando (yellow card) 23'; Ishikawa (yellow card) 64'	Report	Manaka (yellow card) 2' (goal) 34'; Morishima (yellow card) 44'; Axel (yellow card) 49'; João Carlos (yellow card) 80'; Tada (yellow card) 87'; Ōkubo (yellow card) 88'	Stadium: Kashima Soccer Stadium; Attendance: 20,754; Referee: Akio Okutani

2 August 2003 15	Kyoto Purple Sanga	3–1	Kashima Antlers	Kyoto
19:04	Suzuki (yellow card) 14'; Kurobe 30', 53'; Machida 87'; Nakaharai (yellow card) 89'	Report	Nakata 15' (yellow card) 78'; Narahashi (yellow card) 23'; Hirase (yellow card) 41'; Fernando (yellow card) 47'; Ōiwa (yellow card) 60'; Suzuki (yellow card) 67'	Stadium: Kyoto Nishikyogoku Stadium; Attendance: 16,614; Referee: Yuichi Nishimura

==== Second stage ====
===== League table =====
Pos	Team	Pld	W	D	L	GF	GA	GD	Pts
2	JEF United Ichihara	15	7	5	3	24	18	+6	26
3	Júbilo Iwata	15	7	5	3	22	17	+5	26
4	Kashima Antlers	15	6	7	2	21	19	+2	25
5	FC Tokyo	15	6	6	3	32	20	+12	24
6	Urawa Red Diamonds	15	6	5	4	29	19	+10	23

Updated to match(es) played on November 29, 2003. Source: J. League Division 1
Rules for classification: 1) points; 2) goal difference; 3) number of goals scored.

===== Results summary =====
Overall								Home						Away					
Pld	W	D	L	GF	GA	GD	Pts	W	D	L	GF	GA	GD	W	D	L	GF	GA	GD
15	6	7	2	21	19	+2	25	4	3	0	9	4	+5	2	4	2	12	15	−3

Source: J. League Data Site

===== Result round by round =====
Round	1	2	3	4	5	6	7	8	9	10	11	12	13	14	15
Ground	H	A	7	A	H	A	H	A	A	H	A	H	A	H	A
Result	W	D	W	W	D	D	D	D	L	W	L	D	W	W	D
Position	4	4	4	1	1	1	2	5	7	5	7	8	4	2	4

Source: J. League Data Site
A = Away; H = Home; W = Win; D = Draw; L = Loss

===== Matches =====
16 August 2003 1	Kashima Antlers	1–0	Nagoya Grampus Eight	Kashima
18:32	Ogasawara (yellow card) 52' (goal) 56'; Fernando (yellow card) 76'	Report	Narazaki (yellow card) 29'; Takizawa (yellow card) 39'; Tominaga (yellow card) 78'; Chong Yong-de (yellow card) 83'	Stadium: Kashima Soccer Stadium; Attendance: 18,277; Referee: Masayoshi Okada

24 August 2003 2	Tokyo Verdy 1969	1–1	Kashima Antlers	Tokyo
19:03	Yamada 29'; Lopes (yellow card) 70'	Report	Motoyama 38'; Fernando (yellow card) 56'	Stadium: National Stadium; Attendance: 32,085; Referee: Kiyoshi Ota

30 August 2003 3	Kashima Antlers	1–0	Oita Trinita	Kashima
18:32	Soma (yellow card) 22'; Hirase 29'; Narahashi (yellow card) 82'	Report	Sandro (yellow card) 54'; Róbson (yellow card) 68'; Arimura (yellow card) 76'	Stadium: Kashima Soccer Stadium; Attendance: 14,045; Referee: Naotsugu Fuse

7 September 2003 4	JEF United Ichihara	2–3	Kashima Antlers	Tokyo
19:04	Abe 31'; Murai (yellow card) 40'; Choi Yong-soo 68' (yellow card) 12' (yellow-red card) 83'	Report	Aoki (yellow card) 10'; Fernando (yellow card) 20'; Euller (yellow card) 32'; Hirase 34' (yellow card) 62' unknown 44' (o.g.); Soma (red card) 67'; Akita 75'	Stadium: National Stadium; Attendance: 17,680; Referee: Toru Kamikawa

13 September 2003 5	Kashima Antlers	0–0	Vegalta Sendai	Kashima
19:04	Motoyama (yellow card) 68'; Fukai (yellow card) 86'	Report	Kim Eun-jung (yellow card) 70'	Stadium: Kashima Soccer Stadium; Attendance: 18,095; Referee: Masayoshi Okada

20 September 2003 6	Júbilo Iwata	1–1	Kashima Antlers	Iwata
15:00	Gral 42' (yellow card) 60'; Živković (yellow card) 52'; Kawamura (yellow card) 75'	Report	Ogasawara 16'; Fernando (yellow card) 26'; Akita (yellow card) 79'	Stadium: Yamaha Stadium; Attendance: 15,214; Referee: Joji Kashihara

23 September 2003 7	Kashima Antlers	1–1	Kyoto Purple Sanga	Kashima
15:34	Uchida (yellow card) 19'; Hirase 47'; Aoki (yellow card) 51'; Ōiwa (yellow card) 63'; Fernando (yellow card) 75'	Report	Reggie (yellow card) 1' (goal) 33'; Tomita (yellow card) 47'; Saito (yellow card) 88'	Stadium: Kashima Soccer Stadium; Attendance: 15,591; Referee: Akio Okutani

27 September 2003 8	Cerezo Osaka	1–1	Kashima Antlers	Osaka
15:04	Kudo 16'; Morishima (yellow card) 53'; João Carlos (yellow card) 85'	Report	Hirase 89'	Stadium: Nagai Stadium; Attendance: 12,684; Referee: Takuji Shiokawa

4 October 2003 9	FC Tokyo	5–1	Kashima Antlers	Tokyo
15:04	unknown 17' (o.g.); Kelly 32'; Amaral 44'; Kaji (yellow card) 52'; Abe (yellow card) 53' (yellow-red card) 74'; Toda 68'; Kanazawa 89'	Report	Ogasawara (yellow card) 11' (yellow-red card) 58'; Narahashi (red card) 19'; Motoyama (yellow card) 20' unknown 60' (o.g.); Akita (yellow card) 84'	Stadium: Ajinomoto Stadium; Attendance: 29,725; Referee: Hiroyoshi Takayama

18 October 2003 10	Kashima Antlers	2–0	Shimizu S-Pulse	Kashima
15:04	Ōiwa (yellow card) 28'; Honda (yellow card) 42'; Ogasawara 77'; Soma (yellow card) 79' (goal) 82'	Report	Tuto (yellow card) 35'; Takaki (yellow card) 41'; Alex (yellow card) 89' (yellow-red card) 89'	Stadium: Kashima Soccer Stadium; Attendance: 18,724; Referee: Toru Kamikawa

25 October 2003 11	Vissel Kobe	2–1	Kashima Antlers	Kobe
15:04	Miura 43'; Sugawara (yellow card) 43'; Bando 59' (yellow card) 41' (yellow-red card) 82'	Report	Fukai (yellow card) 31'; Ikeuchi (yellow card) 65'; Soma 89'	Stadium: Kobe Universiade Memorial Stadium; Attendance: 12,702; Referee: Joji Kashihara

8 November 2003 12	Kashima Antlers	2–2	Gamba Osaka	Kashima
15:04	Fukai 41', 52'	Report	Magrão 26', 75'	Stadium: Kashima Soccer Stadium; Attendance: 16,404; Referee: Keiichi Sunakawa

15 November 2003 13	Yokohama F. Marinos	1–2	Kashima Antlers	Yokohama
14:02	Kubo 3'; Endō (yellow card) 6'; Yoo Sang-chul (red card) 22'; Marquinhos (yellow card) 40'; Enomoto (yellow card) 57'; Dutra (yellow card) 67'	Report	Akita (yellow card) 4'; Ogasawara (yellow card) 23' (goal) 64'; Hirase (yellow card) 38' (goal) 74'; Ikeuchi (yellow card) 53'; Ōiwa (yellow card) 57'	Stadium: International Stadium; Attendance: 27,359; Referee: Kazuhiko Matsumura

23 November 2003 14	Kashima Antlers	2–1	Kashiwa Reysol	Kashima
15:03	Hirase 13'; Motoyama (yellow card) 21'; Ogasawara 89'	Report	Tanoue 55' (yellow card) 52' (yellow-red card) 73'	Stadium: Kashima Soccer Stadium; Attendance: 19,315; Referee: Akio Okutani

29 November 2003 15	Urawa Red Diamonds	2–2	Kashima Antlers	Saitama
14:04	Suzuki (yellow card) 64'; Nagai 76'; Emerson Sheik 89' (yellow card) 89'	Report	Ogasawara 6'; Aoki 32'; Akita (yellow card) 46'; Ōiwa (yellow card) 79'; Ikeuchi (yellow card) 82'	Stadium: Saitama Stadium 2002; Attendance: 51,195; Referee: Yoshitsugu Katayama

==== Overall table ====
Pos	Team	Pld	W	D	L	GF	GA	GD	Pts
3	JEF United Ichihara	30	15	8	7	57	38	+19	53
4	FC Tokyo	30	13	10	7	46	31	+15	49
5	Kashima Antlers	30	13	9	8	44	40	+4	48
6	Urawa Red Diamonds	30	13	8	9	54	42	+12	47
7	Nagoya Grampus Eight	30	11	12	7	49	42	+7	45

Updated to match(es) played on November 29, 2003. Source: J. League Division 1 first stage, J. League Division 1 second stage
Rules for classification: 1) points; 2) goal difference; 3) number of goals scored.

=== Emperor's Cup ===
Kashima Antlers received a bye to the third round as being part of the J.League Division 1.

14 December 2003 3rd Round	Kashima Antlers	3–2 (a.e.t.)	Avispa Fukuoka	Kashima
	Ogasawara 50'; Akita 90'; Nozawa 110'	Report	Miyazaki 11'; Hayashi 21'	Stadium: Kashima Soccer Stadium; Attendance: 6,426

20 December 2003 4th Round	Kashiwa Reysol	2–3	Kashima Antlers	Kashiwa
	Watanabe 11'; Tamada 41'	Report	Fukai 58', 89'; Nakashima 90'	Stadium: Hitachi Kashiwa Stadium; Attendance: 8,012

23 December 2003 Quarter-finals	Yokohama F. Marinos	1–4	Kashima Antlers	Yokohama
	Dutra 67'	Report	Motoyama 6'; Aoki 27'; Ogasawara 30', 72'	Stadium: International Stadium; Attendance: 16,274

28 December 2003 Semi-finals	Kashima Antlers	1–2 (a.e.t.)	Cerezo Osaka	Kashima
	Nozawa 85'	Report	Ōkubo 9' 115'	Stadium: Kashima Soccer Stadium; Attendance: 12,203

=== J. League Cup ===
Kashima Antlers received a bye to the quarter-finals in order to avoid scheduling conflicts due to their participation in the AFC Champions League.

Quarter-finals

13 August 2003 1st leg	Kashima Antlers	5–1	Nagoya Grampus Eight	Kashima
19:00	Euller 39'; Ogasawara 55'; Nakata 61', 71'; Hirase 80'	Report	Takizawa (yellow card) 51'; Yoshimura 87'	Stadium: Kashima Soccer Stadium; Attendance: 9,525; Referee: Yoshitsugu Katayama

27 August 2003 2nd leg	Nagoya Grampus Eight	0–1 (1–6 agg.)	Kashima Antlers	Nagoya
19:03	Okayama (yellow card) 40'; Ueslei (yellow card) 48'	Report	Oiwa (yellow card) 60'; Aoki (yellow card) 62'; Soma 87'	Stadium: Mizuho Park Athletics Stadium; Attendance: 7,751; Referee: Kazuhisa Osada

Semi-finals

1 October 2003 1st leg	Kashima Antlers	0–1	Júbilo Iwata	Kashima
19:00	Fukai (yellow card) 52'; Hirase (yellow card) 76'; Fernando (yellow card) 83'	Report	Živković 87'	Stadium: Kashima Soccer Stadium; Attendance: 9,915; Referee: Toshimitsu Yoshida

8 October 2003 2nd leg	Júbilo Iwata	0–2 (1–2 agg.)	Kashima Antlers	Iwata, Shizuoka
19:00	Gral (yellow card) 7'; M. Tanaka (yellow card) 21'	Report	Honda (yellow card) 26'; Fernando (yellow card) 36' (goal) 47'; Motoyama 61'; Hirase (yellow card) 71'; Kaneko (yellow card) 77'	Stadium: Yamaha Stadium; Attendance: 11,471; Referee: Masayoshi Okada

Final

3 November 2003 Final	Kashima Antlers	0–4	Urawa Red Diamonds	Tokyo
14:09	Oiwa (yellow card) 9'; Ikeuchi (yellow card) 15'; Ogasawara (yellow card) 29' (yellow-red card) 60'; Honda (yellow card) 79'	Report	Yamase 13'; Nikiforov (yellow card) 33'; Emerson Sheik 48', 86'; Suzuki (yellow card) 53'; T. Tanaka 56'; Zelic (yellow card) 77'	Stadium: National Stadium; Attendance: 51,758; Referee: Toru Kamikawa

== International results ==
=== AFC Champions League ===
Kashima Antlers qualified for this tournament as winners of the 2001 J.League.

Group stage

Pos	Team	Pld	W	D	L	GF	GA	GD	Pts	Qualification
1	(Thailand) BEC Tero Sasana (H)	3	2	1	0	6	3	+3	7	Advance to Knockout stage
2	(South Korea) Daejeon Citizen	3	2	0	1	3	3	0	6	
3	(China) Shanghai Shenhua	3	1	0	2	6	7	−1	3	
4	(Japan) Kashima Antlers	3	0	1	2	5	7	−2	1	

(H) Hosts

10 March 2003 1	Kashima Antlers (Japan)	2–2	(Thailand) BEC Tero Sasana	Bangkok, Thailand
	Hirase 21'; Fernando 77'	(Report)	Yongant 76', 90'	Stadium: Suphachalasai Stadium; Attendance: 10,000; Referee: Naser Al-Hamdan (Saudi Arabia)

12 March 2003 2	Kashima Antlers (Japan)	3–4	(China) Shanghai Shenhua	Bangkok, Thailand
	Aoki 24'; Fernando 56'; Nozawa 90'	(Report)	Yang Guang 1'; Zhang Yuning 11'; Martínez 31', 87'	Stadium: Suphachalasai Stadium; Attendance: 6,000; Referee: Sundarraj Balu (India)

14 March 2003 3	Daejeon Citizen (South Korea)	1–0	(Japan) Kashima Antlers	Bangkok, Thailand
	Coly 87'	(Report)		Stadium: Suphachalasai Stadium; Attendance: 10,000; Referee: Masoud Moradi (Iran)

=== A3 Champions Cup ===
As the tournament was hosted in Japan, Kashima Antlers received an invitation after winning the 2002 J.League Cup.

Pos	Team	Pld	W	D	L	GF	GA	GD	Pts
1	(Japan) Kashima Antlers (C)	3	2	1	0	5	1	+4	7
2	(China) Dalian Shide	3	2	0	1	5	5	0	6
3	(South Korea) Seongnam Ilhwa Chunma	3	1	1	1	4	3	+1	4
4	(Japan) Júbilo Iwata	3	0	0	3	0	5	−5	0

Source: RSSSF
(C) Champions

16 February 2003 1	Dalian Shide (China)	1–3	(Japan) Kashima Antlers	Tokyo, Japan
17:00	Wang Sheng 44'	Report	Akita 29'; Ogasawara 38'; Fernando 53'	Stadium: National Stadium; Attendance: 23,907

19 February 2003 2	Júbilo Iwata (Japan)	0–2	(Japan) Kashima Antlers	Tokyo, Japan
19:00		Report	Euller 8'; Yanagisawa 74'	Stadium: National Stadium; Attendance: 20,176

22 February 2003 3	Kashima Antlers (Japan)	0–0	(South Korea) Seongnam Ilhwa Chunma	Tokyo, Japan
13:30		Report		Stadium: National Stadium; Attendance: 25,423

== Player statistics ==
No.	Pos.	Player	D.o.B. (Age)	Height / Weight	J. League 1		Emperor's Cup		J. League Cup		Total	
No.	Pos.	Player	D.o.B. (Age)	Height / Weight	Apps	Goals	Apps	Goals	Apps	Goals	Apps	Goals
1	GK	Shinya Kato	19 September 1980 (aged 22)	cm / kg	0	0						
2	DF	Akira Narahashi	26 November 1971 (aged 31)	cm / kg	27	1						
3	DF	Yutaka Akita	6 August 1970 (aged 32)	cm / kg	28	1						
4	DF	Go Oiwa	23 June 1972 (aged 30)	cm / kg	29	1						
5	MF	Kōji Nakata	9 July 1979 (aged 23)	cm / kg	18	3						
6	MF	Yasuto Honda	25 June 1969 (aged 33)	cm / kg	19	0						
7	DF	Naoki Soma	19 July 1971 (aged 31)	cm / kg	20	2						
8	MF	Mitsuo Ogasawara	5 April 1979 (aged 23)	cm / kg	27	7						
9	FW	Euller	15 March 1971 (aged 31)	cm / kg	22	4						
10	MF	Masashi Motoyama	20 June 1979 (aged 23)	cm / kg	20	4						
11	FW	Yoshiyuki Hasegawa	11 February 1969 (aged 34)	cm / kg	3	0						
13	FW	Atsushi Yanagisawa	27 May 1977 (aged 25)	cm / kg	8	2						
14	DF	Kenji Haneda	1 December 1981 (aged 21)	cm / kg	0	0						
15	DF	Seiji Kaneko	27 May 1980 (aged 22)	cm / kg	2	0						
16	MF	Fernando	18 June 1978 (aged 24)	cm / kg	27	5						
17	DF	Jun Uchida	14 October 1977 (aged 25)	cm / kg	6	0						
18	MF	Koji Kumagai	23 October 1975 (aged 27)	cm / kg	1	0						
19	FW	Tomoyuki Hirase	23 May 1977 (aged 25)	cm / kg	28	7						
20	DF	Tomohiko Ikeuchi	1 November 1977 (aged 25)	cm / kg	10	0						
21	GK	Hitoshi Sogahata	2 August 1979 (aged 23)	cm / kg	30	0						
22	DF	Tatsuya Ishikawa	25 December 1979 (aged 23)	cm / kg	14	0						
23	MF	Masashi Otani	17 April 1983 (aged 19)	cm / kg	0	0						
24	MF	Takeshi Aoki	28 September 1982 (aged 20)	cm / kg	27	1						
25	MF	Takuya Nozawa	12 August 1981 (aged 21)	cm / kg	5	0						
26	FW	Masaki Fukai	13 September 1980 (aged 22)	cm / kg	22	2						
27	FW	Yuki Nakashima	16 June 1984 (aged 18)	cm / kg	11	0						
28	GK	Shinichi Shuto	8 June 1983 (aged 19)	cm / kg	0	0						
29	GK	Riki Takasaki	11 July 1970 (aged 32)	cm / kg	0	0						
30	FW	Takayuki Suzuki	5 June 1976 (aged 26)	cm / kg	4	0						
31	MF	Claudecir	15 October 1975 (aged 27)	cm / kg	8	2						
32	GK	Yohei Nishibe	1 December 1980 (aged 22)	cm / kg	0	0						
33	MF	Da Silva	5 March 1974 (aged 29)	cm / kg	1	0						

== Other pages ==
- (in Japanese) J. League official site
