= Seiji Kaneko =

Japanese footballer

Seiji Kaneko 金古 聖司
Personal information
- Full name: Seiji Kaneko
- Date of birth: May 27, 1980 (age 46)
- Place of birth: Kurume, Fukuoka, Japan
- Height: 1.80 m (5 ft 11 in)
- Position: Defender

Youth career
- 1996–1998: Higashi Fukuoka High School

Senior career*
Years	Team	Apps	(Gls)
1999–2008	Kashima Antlers	45	(4)
2005	→Vissel Kobe (loan)	10	(0)
2006–2007	→Avispa Fukuoka (loan)	18	(1)
2007	→Nagoya Grampus Eight (loan)	0	(0)
2009–2011	Tampines Rovers	87	(8)
2012	Mitra Kukar	22	(1)
2013	Tampines Rovers		
2014	Ang Thong		
2015	Yangon United		
Total		182	(14)
Medal record
Kashima Antlers
Winner	J1 League	2000
Winner	J1 League	2001
Winner	J1 League	2008
Winner	J.League Cup	2000
Winner	J.League Cup	2002
Runner-up	J.League Cup	1999
Runner-up	J.League Cup	2003
Winner	Emperor's Cup	2000
Runner-up	Emperor's Cup	2002
Representing Japan
AFC U-19 Championship
Silver medal – second place	1998 Thailand
- * Club domestic league appearances and goals

Seiji Kaneko (金古 聖司, Seiji Kaneko; born May 27, 1980) is a Japanese former football player.

== Playing career ==
He started his professional career with Kashima Antlers in 1999 and during his times with Kashima Antlers he has been on loan to Vissel Kobe in 2005, Avispa Fukuoka in 2006-2007 and Nagoya Grampus Eight in 2007 before returning to Kashima Antlers in 2008 and was released by the club at the end of the season. He never played in a single league game during the 2007 or 2008 seasons while on loan to Nagoya Grampus Eight, Avispa Fukuoka, or with the Kashima Antlers.

From 2009 to 2013 he played for Singapore's S.League club Tampines Rovers and was one of their key players, except when he played one season for Mitra Kukar in 2012. Kaneko then moved to Ang Thong in Thailand in 2014, and then to Yangon United FC in Myanmar in 2015.

== Club statistics ==
Club performance			League		Cup		League Cup		Total	
Season	Club	League	Apps	Goals	Apps	Goals	Apps	Goals	Apps	Goals
Japan			League		Emperor's Cup		J.League Cup		Total	
1999	Kashima Antlers	J1 League	0	0	0	0	0	0	0	0
2000	Kashima Antlers	J1 League	10	0	0	0	0	0	10	0
2001	Kashima Antlers	J1 League	8	1	0	0	2	0	10	1
2002	Kashima Antlers	J1 League	3	0	0	0	0	0	3	0
2003	Kashima Antlers	J1 League	2	0	0	0	1	0	3	0
2004	Kashima Antlers	J1 League	22	3	0	0	5	0	27	3
2005	Kashima Antlers	J1 League	0	0	0	0	0	0	0	0
2005	Vissel Kobe	J1 League	10	0	1	1	0	0	11	1
2006	Avispa Fukuoka	J1 League	18	1	1	0	5	0	24	1
2007	Avispa Fukuoka	J2 League	0	0	0	0	-		0	0
2007	Nagoya Grampus Eight	J1 League	0	0	0	0	2	0	2	0
2008	Kashima Antlers	J1 League	0	0	0	0	0	0	0	0
Singapore			League		Singapore Cup		League Cup		Total	
2009	Tampines Rovers	S.League	29	5	3	0	3	1	35	6
2010	Tampines Rovers	S.League	30	2	5	0	1	0	36	2
2011	Tampines Rovers	S.League	28	1	3	0	3	0	34	1
Indonesia			League		Piala Indonesia		League Cup		Total	
2011–12	Mitra Kukar	Super League	22	1	-		-		22	1
Country	Japan		73	5	2	1	15	0	90	6
Country	Singapore		87	8	11	0	7	1	105	9
Country	Indonesia		22	1	-		-		22	1
Total			182	14	13	1	22	1	217	16

== Honours ==
=== Club honours ===
Kashima Antlers

- J1 League (3): 2000, 2001, 2008
- J.League Cup (2): 2000, 2002
- Emperor's Cup (1): 2000

Tampines Rovers

- S.League (1): 2011
- Singapore Charity Shield (1): 2011
