= Akira Narahashi =

Japanese footballer (born 1971)

Akira Narahashi 名良橋 晃
Personal information
- Date of birth: November 26, 1971 (age 54)
- Place of birth: Chiba, Chiba, Japan
- Height: 1.70 m (5 ft 7 in)
- Position: Right-back

Youth career
- 1987–1989: Chiba Eiwa High School

Senior career*
Years	Team	Apps	(Gls)
1990–1996	Bellmare Hiratsuka	199	(21)
1997–2006	Kashima Antlers	196	(16)
2007	Shonan Bellmare	1	(0)
Total		396	(37)

International career
1994–2003	Japan	38	(0)
Medal record
Shonan Bellmare
Winner	Emperor's Cup	1994
Kashima Antlers
Winner	J1 League	1998
Winner	J1 League	2000
Winner	J1 League	2001
Runner-up	J1 League	1997
Winner	J.League Cup	1997
Winner	J.League Cup	2000
Winner	J.League Cup	2002
Runner-up	J.League Cup	1999
Runner-up	J.League Cup	2003
Runner-up	J.League Cup	2006
Winner	Emperor's Cup	1997
Winner	Emperor's Cup	2000
Runner-up	Emperor's Cup	2002
- * Club domestic league appearances and goals

Akira Narahashi (名良橋 晃, Narahashi Akira; born November 26, 1971) is a Japanese former professional footballer who played as a right-back. He earned 38 caps for the Japan national team between 1994 and 2003, including three games at the 1998 FIFA World Cup.

== Club career ==
Narahashi was born in Chiba on November 26, 1971. After graduating from Chiba Eiwa High School in 1990, he joined Fujita Industries (later Bellmare Hiratsuka, Shonan Bellmare) playing in the Japan Soccer League Division 2. In 1992, Japan Soccer League was folded and the club joined new league Japan Football League. The club won the champions in 1993 and was promoted to J1 League. In 1994, the club won Emperor's Cup. In Asia, the club also won 1995 Asian Cup Winners' Cup.

Narahashi moved to Kashima Antlers in 1997. The presence of Jorginho at Kashima propelled his decision to move as he aspired to learn the trade under the Brazilian international full back. In 2000, the club won all three major title in Japan; J1 League, J.League Cup and Emperor's Cup first time in J.League history. The club won J1 League three times, J.League Cup three times and Emperor's Cup two times. From the mid-2000s, his opportunities to play decreased. At the end of the 2006 season, Kashima announced that they wouldn't renew his contract.

Narahashi returned to Bellmare in February 2007 but was released in August 2007. On February 1, 2008, he announced his retirement from professional football.

== International career ==
On September 27, 1994, Narahashi debuted for Japan national team against Australia. He competed with Hiroshige Yanagimoto for regular of right side-back. Yanagimoto was hurt in 1997, Narahashi became a regular. At 1998 FIFA World Cup qualification, Japan won the qualify for 1998 FIFA World Cup first time in Japan's history. In 1998, he played in all three matches at 1998 World Cup.

After 2002 FIFA World Cup, in October, Narahashi was selected Japan by new manager Zico for the first time in four years. He was also selected Japan for 2003 FIFA Confederations Cup, but he did not play in the match. He played 38 games for Japan until 2003.

== Career statistics ==
=== Club ===
Appearances and goals by club, season and competition
Club	Season	League			Emperor's Cup		J.League Cup		Asia		Total	
Club	Season	Division	Apps	Goals	Apps	Goals	Apps	Goals	Apps	Goals	Apps	Goals
Bellmare Hiratsuka (Note: "Fujita Industries" until 1994)	1990–91	JSL Division 2	25	5			1	0	–		26	5
Bellmare Hiratsuka	1991–92	JSL Division 2	25	3			3	0	–		28	3
Bellmare Hiratsuka	1992	Football League	18	1			–		–		18	1
Bellmare Hiratsuka	1993	Football League	17	5	1	0	5	0	–		23	5
Bellmare Hiratsuka	1994	J1 League	39	2	4	0	1	0	–		44	2
Bellmare Hiratsuka	1995	J1 League	46	4	2	0	–		–		48	4
Bellmare Hiratsuka	1996	J1 League	29	1	3	0	14	1	–		46	2
Kashima Antlers	1997	J1 League	17	1	5	0	7	1	–		29	2
Kashima Antlers	1998	J1 League	33	5	4	0	1	0	–		38	5
Kashima Antlers	1999	J1 League	15	2	2	1	7	1	–		24	4
Kashima Antlers	2000	J1 League	26	3	4	0	7	1	–		37	4
Kashima Antlers	2001	J1 League	27	3	3	0	6	0	–		36	3
Kashima Antlers	2002	J1 League	25	1	5	0	8	0	–		38	1
Kashima Antlers	2003	J1 League	27	1	0	0	4	0	3	0	34	1
Kashima Antlers	2004	J1 League	12	0	0	0	4	0	–		16	0
Kashima Antlers	2005	J1 League	11	0	3	0	0	0	–		14	0
Kashima Antlers	2006	J1 League	3	0	0	0	0	0	–		3	0
Shonan Bellmare	2007	J2 League	1	0	0	0	–		–		1	0
Career total			396	37	36	1	68	4	3	0	503	42

=== International ===
Appearances and goals by national team and year
National team	Year	Apps	Goals
Japan	1994	1	0
Japan	1995	9	0
Japan	1996	0	0
Japan	1997	13	0
Japan	1998	9	0
Japan	1999	0	0
Japan	2000	0	0
Japan	2001	0	0
Japan	2002	2	0
Japan	2003	4	0
Total		38	0

== Honors ==
With Shonan Bellmare

- Emperor's Cup: 1994
- Asian Cup Winner's Cup: 1995

With Kashima Antlers

- J - League: 1998, 2000, 2001
- Emperor's Cup: 1997, 2000
- J - League Cup: 1997, 2000, 2002
- Japanese Super Cup: 1997, 2000, 2002

Individual

- J1 League Best Eleven: 2001
