= Atsushi Yanagisawa =

Japanese footballer (born 1977)

Atsushi Yanagisawa 柳沢 敦
Personal information
- Full name: Atsushi Yanagisawa
- Date of birth: May 27, 1977 (age 49)
- Place of birth: Imizu, Toyama, Japan
- Height: 1.77 m (5 ft 10 in)
- Position: Forward

Team information
- Current team: Kashima Antlers (Assistant Manager)

Youth career
- 1993–1995: Toyama Daiichi High School

Senior career*
Years	Team	Apps	(Gls)
1996–2003	Kashima Antlers	178	(71)
2003–2004	Sampdoria	15	(0)
2004–2006	Messina	29	(0)
2006–2007	Kashima Antlers	42	(9)
2008–2010	Kyoto Sanga FC	85	(21)
2011–2014	Vegalta Sendai	66	(7)
Total		415	(108)

International career
1997	Japan U20	5	(4)
2000	Japan U23	4	(1)
1998–2006	Japan	58	(17)

Managerial career
- 2015–2018: Kashima Antlers (assistant)
- 2025–: Kashima Antlers (assistant)
Medal record
Kashima Antlers
Winner	J1 League	1996
Winner	J1 League	1998
Winner	J1 League	2000
Winner	J1 League	2001
Winner	J1 League	2007
Runner-up	J1 League	1997
Winner	J.League Cup	1997
Winner	J.League Cup	2000
Winner	J.League Cup	2002
Runner-up	J.League Cup	1999
Runner-up	J.League Cup	2003
Runner-up	J.League Cup	2006
Winner	Emperor's Cup	1997
Winner	Emperor's Cup	2000
Winner	Emperor's Cup	2007
Runner-up	Emperor's Cup	2002
Vegalta Sendai
Runner-up	J1 League	2012
Representing Japan
AFC Asian Cup
Gold medal – first place	2000 Lebanon
- * Club domestic league appearances and goals

Atsushi Yanagisawa (柳沢 敦, Yanagisawa Atsushi; born May 27, 1977) is a Japanese former professional footballer who played as a forward. He played for Japan national team.

He is best known for playing the majority of his career at Kashima Antlers, in addition to his spells with Italian sides Sampdoria and Messina.

Yanagisawa earned 58 caps for the Japan national team, and represented them at two FIFA World Cup, the 2000 Olympics and the 2000 AFC Asian Cup.

== Club career ==
Yanagisawa was born in Imizu on May 27, 1977. After graduating from high school, he joined Kashima Antlers in 1996. He debuted in May 1996. In 1997, he became a regular player and was selected Rookie of the Year awards. In 1990s, the club won the champions at 1996, 1998 J1 League, 1997 J.League Cup and 1997 Emperor's Cup. In Asia, the club won 3rd place at 1998–99 Asian Cup Winners' Cup. In 2000, the club won all three major title in Japan; J1 League, J.League Cup and Emperor's Cup. In 2001, the club won J1 League for two consecutive seasons and he was selected Japanese Footballer of the Year awards. In 2002, the club won J.League Cup.

In June 2003, Yanagisawa moved to Italian Serie A club Sampdoria. He moved to Messina in 2004.

In March 2006, Yanagisawa returned to Kashima Antlers. In 2007, the club won J1 League and Emperor's Cup. However his opportunity to play decreased behind young player Yuzo Tashiro and Shinzo Koroki. He moved to Kyoto Sanga FC in 2008. He scored 14 goals which is top score in Japanese player in the league. However he could not scored many goals from 2009. He moved to Vegalta Sendai in 2011. In March 2011, 2011 Tōhoku earthquake and tsunami occurred in wide area including Sendai. Although he did not play many matches, the club won the 4th place in 2011 and second place in 2012. He retired end of 2014 season.

== International career ==
In June 1997, Yanagisawa was selected Japan U20 national team for 1997 World Youth Championship. At this competition, he wore the number 10 shirt for Japan and played all five matches and scored four goals.

On February 15, 1998, Yanagisawa debuted for Japan national team against Australia. From 1999, he was selected Japan well by manager Philippe Troussier.

In September 2000, he also was selected Japan U23 national team for 2000 Summer Olympics. He played in all four matches and scored a goal against United States in Quarterfinal.

In October, he also played at 2000 AFC Asian Cup and Japan won the champions. In 2002, he was selected Japan for 2002 FIFA World Cup. He played as forward with club teammate Takayuki Suzuki in three games. He also played at 2005 FIFA Confederations Cup and 2006 FIFA World Cup. He played 58 games and scored 17 goals for Japan until 2006.

== Career statistics ==
=== Club ===
Appearances and goals by club, season and competition
Club	Season	League			National cup		League cup		Total	
Club	Season	Division	Apps	Goals	Apps	Goals	Apps	Goals	Apps	Goals
Kashima Antlers	1996	J1 League	8	5	1	0	6	1	15	6
Kashima Antlers	1997	J1 League	25	8	5	2	9	2	39	12
Kashima Antlers	1998	J1 League	32	22	1	0	5	0	38	22
Kashima Antlers	1999	J1 League	26	9	2	0	3	1	31	10
Kashima Antlers	2000	J1 League	26	6	3	1	3	0	32	7
Kashima Antlers	2001	J1 League	26	12	1	1	5	2	32	15
Kashima Antlers	2002	J1 League	27	7	5	1	3	0	35	8
Kashima Antlers	2003	J1 League	8	2	0	0	0	0	8	2
Kashima Antlers	Total		178	71	18	5	34	6	230	82
Sampdoria	2003–04	Serie A	15	0	3	0	–		18	0
Messina	2004–05	Serie A	22	0	4	1	–		26	1
Messina	2005–06	Serie A	7	0	0	0	–		7	0
Messina	Total		29	0	4	1	–		33	1
Kashima Antlers	2006	J1 League	23	4	2	1	3	1	28	6
Kashima Antlers	2007	J1 League	19	5	5	2	6	2	30	9
Kashima Antlers	Total		42	9	7	3	9	3	58	15
Kyoto Sanga FC	2008	J1 League	32	14	2	0	6	1	40	15
Kyoto Sanga FC	2009	J1 League	22	4	2	1	5	1	29	6
Kyoto Sanga FC	2010	J1 League	31	3	2	0	5	3	38	6
Kyoto Sanga FC	Total		85	21	6	1	16	5	107	27
Vegalta Sendai	2011	J1 League	17	1	0	0	1	0	18	1
Vegalta Sendai	2012	J1 League	16	2	2	0	4	0	22	2
Vegalta Sendai	2013	J1 League	20	3	1	0	0	0	21	3
Vegalta Sendai	2014	J1 League	13	1	1	1	0	0	14	2
Vegalta Sendai	Total		66	7	4	1	5	0	75	8
Career total			415	108	36	11	64	14	521	133

=== International ===
Appearances and goals by national team and year
National team	Year	Apps	Goals
Japan	1998	2	0
Japan	1999	4	0
Japan	2000	10	4
Japan	2001	6	5
Japan	2002	9	0
Japan	2003	5	2
Japan	2004	8	2
Japan	2005	10	4
Japan	2006	4	0
Total		58	17

Scores and results list Japan's goal tally first, score column indicates score after each Yanagisawa goal.

List of international goals scored by Atsushi Yanagisawa
No.	Date	Venue	Opponent	Score	Result	Competition
1	June 6, 2000	Rabat, Morocco	Jamaica		4–0	Hassan II International Cup
2	June 18, 2000	Yokohama, Japan	Bolivia		2–0	2000 Kirin Cup
3	June 18, 2000	Yokohama, Japan	Bolivia		2–0	2000 Kirin Cup
4	October 14, 2000	Sidon, Lebanon	Saudi Arabia		4–1	2000 AFC Asian Cup
5	August 15, 2001	Fukuroi, Shizuoka, Japan	Australia		3–0	Friendly
6	July 1, 2001	Sapporo, Japan	Paraguay		2–0	2001 Kirin Cup
7	July 1, 2001	Sapporo, Japan	Paraguay		2–0	2001 Kirin Cup
8	October 7, 2001	Southampton, England	Nigeria		2–2	Friendly
9	November 7, 2001	Saitama, Japan	Italy		1–1	Friendly
10	October 8, 2003	Tunis, Tunisia	Tunisia		1–0	Friendly
11	October 11, 2003	Bucharest, Romania	Romania		1–1	Friendly
12	February 12, 2004	Fukuroi, Shizuoka, Japan	Iraq		2–0	Friendly
13	July 9, 2004	Ōita, Japan	Slovakia		3–1	2004 Kirin Cup
14	June 8, 2005	Bangkok, Thailand	North Korea		2–0	2006 FIFA World Cup qualification
15	June 16, 2005	Hanover, Germany	Mexico		1–2	2005 FIFA Confederations Cup
16	September 7, 2005	Rifu, Miyagi, Japan	Honduras		5–4	Friendly
17	September 7, 2005	Rifu, Miyagi, Japan	Honduras		5–4	Friendly

== Honors ==
Kashima Antlers

- J1 League: 1996, 1998, 2000, 2001, 2007
- Emperor's Cup: 1997, 2000, 2007
- J - League Cup: 1997, 2000, 2002
- Japanese Super Cup: 1997, 1998, 1999

Japan

- AFC Asian Cup: 2000

Individual

- Asian Player of the Month: January 1998
- J.League Rookie of the Year: 1997
- J.League Best XI: 1998, 2001, 2008
- Japanese Footballer of the Year: 2001
