= Tomoyuki Hirase =

Japanese footballer

Tomoyuki Hirase 平瀬 智行
Personal information
- Full name: Tomoyuki Hirase
- Date of birth: 23 May 1977 (age 49)
- Place of birth: Kagoshima, Japan
- Height: 1.83 m (6 ft 0 in)
- Position: Forward

Youth career
- 1993–1995: Kagoshima Jitsugyo High School

Senior career*
Years	Team	Apps	(Gls)
1996–2004	Kashima Antlers	118	(25)
1998	→ CFZ (loan)		
2002	→ Yokohama F. Marinos (loan)	19	(2)
2004–2007	Vissel Kobe	62	(8)
2008–2010	Vegalta Sendai	89	(19)
Total		288	(54)

International career
2000	Japan U-23	2	(0)
2000	Japan	2	(0)
Medal record
Kashima Antlers
Winner	J1 League	1996
Winner	J1 League	2000
Winner	J1 League	2001
Runner-up	J1 League	1997
Winner	J.League Cup	1997
Winner	J.League Cup	2000
Winner	J.League Cup	2002
Runner-up	J.League Cup	1999
Runner-up	J.League Cup	2003
Winner	Emperor's Cup	1997
Winner	Emperor's Cup	2000
Runner-up	Emperor's Cup	2002
Yokohama F. Marinos
Runner-up	J1 League	2002
- * Club domestic league appearances and goals

Tomoyuki Hirase (平瀬 智行, Hirase Tomoyuki; born 23 May 1977) is a former Japanese football player. He played twice for the Japan national football team.

== Club career ==
Hirase was born in Kagoshima Prefecture on 23 May 1977. After graduating from high school, he joined Kashima Antlers in 1996. He played many matches from 1999. In 2000, the club won all three major title in Japan; J1 League, J.League Cup and Emperor's Cup. In 2001, the club won the champions J1 League for 2 years in a row. In July 2002, he moved to Yokohama F. Marinos on loan. He returned to Kashima Antlers in 2003 and moved to Vissel Kobe in August 2004. He moved to Vegalta Sendai in 2008. He retired end of 2010 season.

== National team career ==
On 5 February 2000, Hirase debuted for Japan national team against Mexico. He played 2 games for Japan in 2000.

In September 2000, Hirase was selected Japan U-23 national team for 2000 Summer Olympics. He played 2 matches.

== Club statistics ==
Club performance			League		Cup		League Cup		Continental		Total	
Season	Club	League	Apps	Goals	Apps	Goals	Apps	Goals	Apps	Goals	Apps	Goals
Japan			League		Emperor's Cup		J.League Cup		Asia		Total	
1996	Kashima Antlers	J1 League	0	0	0	0	0	0	-		0	0
1997	Kashima Antlers	J1 League	1	0	0	0	0	0	-		1	0
1999	Kashima Antlers	J1 League	22	5	2	0	2	0	-		26	5
2000	Kashima Antlers	J1 League	26	11	5	0	5	4	-		36	15
2001	Kashima Antlers	J1 League	23	0	3	2	3	1	-		29	3
2002	Kashima Antlers	J1 League	7	2	0	0	5	1	-		12	3
2002	Yokohama F. Marinos	J1 League	19	2	2	1	0	0	-		21	3
2003	Kashima Antlers	J1 League	28	7	4	0	4	1	2	1	38	9
2004	Kashima Antlers	J1 League	11	0	0	0	5	1	-		16	1
2004	Vissel Kobe	J1 League	10	1	1	0	-		-		11	1
2005	Vissel Kobe	J1 League	19	4	1	0	3	0	-		23	4
2006	Vissel Kobe	J2 League	30	3	1	1	-		-		31	4
2007	Vissel Kobe	J1 League	3	0	0	0	1	0	-		4	0
2008	Vegalta Sendai	J2 League	38	11	0	0	-		-		38	11
2009	Vegalta Sendai	J2 League	40	8	1	1	-		-		41	9
2010	Vegalta Sendai	J1 League	11	0	1	0	5	0	-		17	0
Career total			288	54	21	5	33	8	2	1	377	76

== National team statistics ==
Japan national team
Year	Apps	Goals
2000	2	0
Total	2	0

=== Appearances in major competitions ===
Year	Competition	Category	Appearances		Goals	Team Record
Year	Competition	Category	Start	Sub	Goals	Team Record
2000	2000 AFC Asian Cup qualification	Senior	0	1	0	Qualified
2000	2000 Olympics	U-23	0	1	0	Quarterfinals
