= Mitsuo Ogasawara =

Japanese footballer (born 1979)

Mitsuo Ogasawara 小笠原 満男
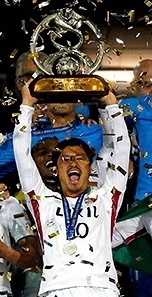
- Ogasawara lifting the 2018 ACL trophy with the Kashima Antlers

Personal information
- Full name: Mitsuo Ogasawara
- Date of birth: 5 April 1979 (age 47)
- Place of birth: Morioka, Iwate, Japan
- Height: 1.73 m (5 ft 8 in)
- Position: Midfielder

Youth career
- 1995–1997: Ofunato High School

Senior career*
Years	Team	Apps	(Gls)
1998–2018	Kashima Antlers	525	(69)
2006–2007	→ Messina Peloro (loan)	6	(1)
Total		531	(70)

International career
1999	Japan U-20	7	(1)
2002–2010	Japan	55	(7)
Medal record
Kashima Antlers
Winner	AFC Champions League	2018
Winner	J1 League	1998
Winner	J1 League	2000
Winner	J1 League	2001
Winner	J1 League	2007
Winner	J1 League	2008
Winner	J1 League	2009
Winner	J1 League	2016
Runner-up	J1 League	2017
Winner	J.League Cup	2000
Winner	J.League Cup	2002
Winner	J.League Cup	2011
Winner	J.League Cup	2012
Winner	J.League Cup	2015
Runner-up	J.League Cup	1999
Runner-up	J.League Cup	2003
Runner-up	J.League Cup	2006
Winner	Emperor's Cup	2000
Winner	Emperor's Cup	2007
Winner	Emperor's Cup	2010
Winner	Emperor's Cup	2016
Runner-up	Emperor's Cup	2002
Representing Japan
AFC Asian Cup
Gold medal – first place	2004 China
FIFA U-20 World Cup
Silver medal – second place	1999 Nigeria
AFC U-19 Championship
Silver medal – second place	1998 Thailand
- * Club domestic league appearances and goals

Mitsuo Ogasawara (小笠原 満男, Ogasawara Mitsuo; born 5 April 1979) is a Japanese former professional footballer who played as a midfielder. He played for Japan national team.

== Club career ==
Ogasawara was born in Morioka on 5 April 1979. After graduating from high school, he joined J1 League club Kashima Antlers in 1998. He debuted in April 1998 and played many matches as offensive midfielder from 1999. In 2000, he became a regular midfielder and Antlers won the champions all three major title in Japan; J1 League, J.League Cup and Emperor's Cup first time in J1 League history. At Emperor's Cup Final, he scored two goals and contributed to won the champions. The club also won the champions 2001 J1 League for two consecutiveyears. In Final at 2002 J.League Cup, he scored a winning goal and Antlers won the champions. He was also selected MVP award. He was also selected Best Eleven award in J1 League for five consecutive years (2001-2005).

In August 2006, Ogasawara moved to Italy and signed with Serie A club Messina Peloro on loan. However he could not play many matches.

In July 2007, Ogasawara returned to Antlers. He played many matches as defensive midfielder and Antlers won the champions in J1 League for the first time in six years. Antlers also won the champions in 2007 Emperor's Cup. Antlers won the champions in J1 League for three consecutive seasons (2007-2009). In 2009, he was selected MVP award. From 2010 season, Antlers won the champions 2010 Emperor's Cup, 2011, 2012 and 2015 J.League Cup. He was also MVP award in 2015 J.League Cup. In 2016, Antlers won the champions in J1 League and qualified for 2016 Club World Cup as host country champions. At Club World Cup, he played three matches and won the second place. Antlers also won the champions in 2016 Emperor's Cup. From 2017, his opportunity to play decreased. In 2018, Antlers won the champions in AFC Champions League first Asian title in the club history. He retired end of 2018 season.

== International career ==
In April 1999, Ogasawara was selected Japan U-20 national team for 1999 World Youth Championship. At this tournament, he played all 7 matches as offensive midfielder and Japan won the 2nd place.

On 21 March 2002, Ogasawara debuted for Japan national team under manager Philippe Troussier against Ukraine. In June, he was selected Japan for 2002 World Cup. He played a match against Tunisia. Japan qualified to the knockout stage first time in Japan's history.

After 2002 World Cup, Ogasawara played many matches as starting member under manager Zico. He was selected Japan for 2003 Confederations Cup and 2004 Asian Cup. At 2004 Asian Cup, although he played only 2 matches, Japan won the champions. In 2005, he was selected Japan for 2005 Confederations Cup and played all 3 matches. In 2006, he was selected Japan for 2006 World Cup. Although he played 2 matches, Japan was eliminated in the group stages.

After 2006 World Cup, Ogasawara was not selected Japan for generational change. In February 2010, he was selected Japan by manager Takeshi Okada. He played for Japan for the first time in 4 years. He played 55 games and scored 7 goals for Japan until 2010.

== Career statistics ==
=== Club ===
Appearances and goals by club, season and competition
Club	Season	League			National cup		League cup		Continental		Other (Note: Includes Japanese Super Cup, J.League Championship, A3 Champions Cup Suruga Bank Championship and FIFA Club World Cup)		Total	
Club	Season	Division	Apps	Goals	Apps	Goals	Apps	Goals	Apps	Goals	Apps	Goals	Apps	Goals
Kashima Antlers	1998	J1 League	5	0	2	1	0	0	2	1	–		9	2
Kashima Antlers	1999	J1 League	15	4	1	0	5	0	–		0	0	21	4
Kashima Antlers	2000	J1 League	28	3	5	4	5	2	4	1	2	0	44	10
Kashima Antlers	2001	J1 League	24	7	3	2	3	0	-		3	1	33	10
Kashima Antlers	2002	J1 League	27	4	5	0	3	1	6	0	1	0	42	5
Kashima Antlers	2003	J1 League	27	7	4	3	3	1	3	0	3	1	40	12
Kashima Antlers	2004	J1 League	28	7	3	0	2	0	–		–		33	7
Kashima Antlers	2005	J1 League	30	11	2	0	0	0	–		–		32	11
Kashima Antlers	2006	J1 League	20	3	0	0	2	1	–		–		22	4
Messina Peloro	2006/07	Serie A	6	1	2	0	–		–		–		8	1
Kashima Antlers	2007	J1 League	14	4	5	1	3	1	–		–		22	6
Kashima Antlers	2008	J1 League	24	5	0	0	2	0	7	1	1	0	34	6
Kashima Antlers	2009	J1 League	32	3	4	0	2	1	7	1	–		45	5
Kashima Antlers	2010	J1 League	33	3	5	0	2	1	6	1	1	0	47	5
Kashima Antlers	2011	J1 League	31	1	1	0	3	0	6	0	–		41	1
Kashima Antlers	2012	J1 League	31	2	4	0	7	0	–		1	0	43	2
Kashima Antlers	2013	J1 League	33	2	3	0	5	0	-		1	0	42	2
Kashima Antlers	2014	J1 League	33	2	1	0	4	0	–		–		38	2
Kashima Antlers	2015	J1 League	29	1	0	0	5	0	5	0	–		39	1
Kashima Antlers	2016	J1 League	30	0	6	0	4	0	–		8	0	48	0
Kashima Antlers	2017	J1 League	17	0	3	0	2	0	4	0	1	0	27	0
Kashima Antlers	2018	J1 League	14	0	2	0	1	0	6	0	1	0	24	0
Career total			531	70	59	11	63	8	56	5	23	2	732	96

=== International ===
Appearances and goals by national team and year
National team	Year	Apps	Goals
Japan	2002	8	0
Japan	2003	8	0
Japan	2004	12	2
Japan	2005	15	4
Japan	2006	10	1
Japan	2007	0	0
Japan	2008	0	0
Japan	2009	0	0
Japan	2010	2	0
Total		55	7

Scores and results list Japan's goal tally first, score column indicates score after each Ogasawara goal.

List of international goals scored by Mitsuo Ogasawara
No.	Date	Venue	Opponent	Score	Result	Competition
1	7 February 2004	Kashima, Japan	Malaysia		4–0	Friendly
2	9 June 2004	Saitama, Japan	India		7–0	2006 FIFA World Cup qualification
3	2 February 2005	Saitama, Japan	Syria		3–0	Friendly
4	9 February 2005	Saitama, Japan	North Korea		2–1	2006 FIFA World Cup qualification
5	3 June 2005	Madinat 'Isa, Bahrain	Bahrain		1–0	2006 FIFA World Cup qualification
6	7 September 2005	Rifu, Japan	Honduras		5–4	Friendly
7	18 February 2006	Fukuroi, Japan	Finland		2–0	Friendly

== Honours ==
Kashima Antlers

- J1 League – 1998, 2000, 2001, 2007, 2008, 2009, 2016
- Emperor's Cup – 2000, 2007, 2010, 2016
- J.League Cup – 2000, 2002, 2011, 2012, 2015
- Japanese Super Cup – 1999, 2009, 2010, 2017
- A3 Champions Cup – 2003
- FIFA Club World Cup: 2016 Runner-up.
- AFC Champions League - 2018

Japan

- FIFA World Youth Championship – 1999 (Runner-up)
- AFC Asian Cup – 2004

Individual

- J.League Most Valuable Player – 2009
- Japanese Footballer of the Year – 2009
- J.League Best Eleven – 2001, 2002, 2003, 2004, 2005, 2009
- J. League Cup MVP – 2002
