= 2002 Kashima Antlers season =

Kashima Antlers
2002 season
- Manager: Toninho Cerezo
- Stadium: Kashima Soccer Stadium
- J.League 1: 4th
- Emperor's Cup: Runners-up
- J.League Cup: Champions
- Top goalscorer: Atsushi Yanagisawa (7); Euller (7)
Home colours	Away colours

2002 Kashima Antlers season

== Competitions ==
Competitions	Position
J.League 1	4th / 16 clubs
Emperor's Cup	Runners-up
J.League Cup	Champions

== Domestic results ==
=== J.League 1 ===
==== First stage ====
Pos	Team	Pld	W	OTW	D	L	GF	GA	GD	Pts
3	Nagoya Grampus Eight	15	9	1	0	5	28	18	+10	29
4	Gamba Osaka	15	8	1	1	5	35	19	+16	27
5	Kashima Antlers (Note: Champion from 2001 J.League Division 1)	15	9	0	0	6	21	18	+3	27
6	Kyoto Purple Sanga (Note: Promoted from 2001 J.League Division 2)	15	5	4	1	5	26	18	+8	24
7	Shimizu S-Pulse (Note: Cup-Winner 2001 Emperor's Cup)	15	5	3	3	4	17	19	−2	24

Source: J.League Data Site
Notes:

Match	Date	Venue	Opponents	Score
1-1	2002.3.2	Tokyo Stadium	FC Tokyo	2-4
1-2	2002.3.9	Kashima Soccer Stadium	Shimizu S-Pulse	0-1 a.e.t. (sudden death)
1-3	2002.3.16	National Olympic Stadium (Tokyo)	JEF United Ichihara	2-0
1-4	2002.3.31	Hiroshima Big Arch	Sanfrecce Hiroshima	1-0
1-5	2002.4.6	Kashima Soccer Stadium	Vegalta Sendai	0-2
1-6	2002.4.13	Shizuoka Stadium	Júbilo Iwata	0-2
1-7	2002.4.20	Hakodate (ja:函館市千代台公園陸上競技場)	Consadole Sapporo	3-1
1-8	2002.7.13	Kashima Soccer Stadium	Tokyo Verdy 1969	1-0
1-9	2002.7.20	Kashima Soccer Stadium	Kashiwa Reysol	3-2
1-10	2002.7.24	Nishikyogoku Athletic Stadium	Kyoto Purple Sanga	1-2 a.e.t. (sudden death)
1-11	2002.7.27	Kashima Soccer Stadium	Vissel Kobe	1-0
1-12	2002.8.3	Toyota Stadium	Nagoya Grampus Eight	1-2
1-13	2002.8.7	Urawa Komaba Stadium	Urawa Red Diamonds	2-0
1-14	2002.8.11	Kashima Soccer Stadium	Yokohama F. Marinos	2-1
1-15	2002.8.17	Kashima Soccer Stadium	Gamba Osaka	2-1

==== Second stage ====
Pos	Team	Pld	W	OTW	D	L	GF	GA	GD	Pts	Qualification
1	Júbilo Iwata	15	9	4	0	2	33	13	+20	35	Qualification to the Suntory Championship
2	Gamba Osaka	15	7	3	0	5	24	13	+11	27	
3	Kashima Antlers (Note: Champion from 2001 J.League Division 1)	15	8	1	0	6	25	21	+4	26	
4	Tokyo Verdy 1969	15	6	2	2	5	26	19	+7	24	
5	FC Tokyo	15	6	2	0	7	20	19	+1	22	

Source: J.League Data Site
Notes:

Match	Date	Venue	Opponents	Score
2-1	2002.8.31	Sendai Stadium	Vegalta Sendai	2-1
2-2	2002.9.7	Kashima Soccer Stadium	Júbilo Iwata	1-2
2-3	2002.9.15	National Olympic Stadium (Tokyo)	Tokyo Verdy 1969	3-2
2-4	2002.9.18	Kashima Soccer Stadium	Kyoto Purple Sanga	2-1
2-5	2002.9.21	Kashiwa no Ha Park Stadium	Kashiwa Reysol	0-1
2-6	2002.9.28	Kashima Soccer Stadium	JEF United Ichihara	3-2
2-7	2002.10.6	Kashima Soccer Stadium	Nagoya Grampus Eight	4-1
2-8	2002.10.12	Kobe Universiade Memorial Stadium	Vissel Kobe	0-1
2-9	2002.10.19	International Stadium Yokohama	Yokohama F. Marinos	0-2
2-10	2002.10.23	Kashima Soccer Stadium	Urawa Red Diamonds	2-1
2-11	2002.10.27	Kashima Soccer Stadium	Consadole Sapporo	3-2 a.e.t. (sudden death)
2-12	2002.11.9	Osaka Expo '70 Stadium	Gamba Osaka	2-0
2-13	2002.11.16	Kashima Soccer Stadium	Sanfrecce Hiroshima	0-2
2-14	2002.11.24	Nihondaira Sports Stadium	Shimizu S-Pulse	1-2
2-15	2002.11.30	Kashima Soccer Stadium	FC Tokyo	2-1

=== Emperor's Cup ===
15 December 2002 Third round	Kashima Antlers	4–0	Tokyo Gakugei University	Kashima
	Akita 16'; Augusto César 44'; Yanagisawa 58'; Motoyama 88'	Report		Stadium: Kashima Soccer Stadium; Attendance: 8,341

22 December 2002 Fourth Round	Kashima Antlers	1–0 (a.e.t.)	Omiya Ardija	Kashima
	Euller 103'	Report		Stadium: Kashima Soccer Stadium; Attendance: 8,850

25 December 2002 Quarterfinals	Kashima Antlers	1–0	Kawasaki Frontale	Kashima
	Motoyama 65'	Report		Stadium: Kashima Soccer Stadium; Attendance: 9,650

29 December 2002 Semifinals	JEF United Ichihara	0–2	Kashima Antlers	Ichihara
		Report	Euller 31', 90'	Stadium: Ichihara Stadium; Attendance: 10,928

1 January 2003 Final	Kashima Antlers	1–2	Kyoto Purple Sanga	Tokyo
	Euller 15'	Report	Park Ji-sung 50'; Kurobe 80'	Stadium: National Stadium; Attendance: 50,526

=== J.League Cup ===
Pos	Team	Pld	W	D	L	GF	GA	GD	Pts	Qualification
1	Urawa Red Diamonds	6	4	1	1	12	10	+2	13	Quarterfinals
2	Kashima Antlers	6	3	0	3	9	10	−1	9	Quarterfinals
3	Nagoya Grampus Eight	6	2	1	3	11	9	+2	7	
4	Sanfrecce Hiroshima	6	1	2	3	4	7	−3	5	

Source: rsssf.com

Match	Date	Venue	Opponents	Score
GL-D-1	2002..			-
GL-D-2	2002..			-
GL-D-3	2002..			-
GL-D-4	2002..			-
GL-D-5	2002..			-
GL-D-6	2002..			-

Final Stage

4 September 2002 Quarterfinals	Júbilo Iwata	1–2	Kashima Antlers	Iwata
19:00	Nakayama 7'; Tanaka (yellow card) 30'; Fukunishi (yellow card) 32'; Gral (yellow card) 62'; Nishi (yellow card) 75'	Report	Nakata (yellow card) 11'; Euller 22', 74' (yellow card) 26'; Sogahata (yellow card) 62'	Stadium: Júbilo Iwata Stadium; Attendance: 10,706; Referee: Masayoshi Okada

2 October 2002 Semifinals	Kashima Antlers	2–1 (a.e.t.)	Shimizu S-Pulse	Kashima
19:00	unknown 25' (o.g.); Hasegawa 106'	Report	Pecelj (yellow card) 65'; Alex 67'; Toda (yellow card) 76'	Stadium: Kashima Soccer Stadium; Attendance: 9,102; Referee: Masayoshi Okada

4 November 2002 Final	Kashima Antlers	1–0	Urawa Red Diamonds	Tokyo
14:09	Ogasawara (yellow card) 34' (goal) 59'; Euller (yellow card) 46'; Narahashi (yellow card) 58'	Report	Emerson Sheik (yellow card) 1'; Yamada (yellow card) 71'; Ihara (yellow card) 76'	Stadium: National Stadium; Attendance: 56,064; Referee: Toshimitsu Yoshida

== International results ==
=== Asian Club Championship ===
First round

24 October 2001	Kashima Antlers (Japan)	4–1	(Indonesia) Persija Jakarta	Kashima, Japan
		Report		Stadium: Kashima Soccer Stadium
Note: The series was originally scheduled as a two-legged tie, but was reduced to a single match due to an ongoing political crisis at Indonesia.

Second round

24 November 2001 1st Leg	Kashima Antlers (Japan)	3–0	(Thailand) BEC Tero Sasana	Kashima, Japan
		Report		Stadium: Kashima Soccer Stadium

5 February 2002 2nd Leg	BEC Tero Sasana (Thailand)	1–0 (1–3 agg.)	(Japan) Kashima Antlers	Bangkok, Thailand
		Report		Stadium: Boonyachinda Stadium

Quarterfinals

Team	Pld	W	D	L	GF	GA	GD	Pts	Qualification
(South Korea) Suwon Samsung Bluewings	3	2	1	0	4	0	+4	7	Advance to Semi-finals
(South Korea) Anyang LG Cheetahs	3	0	3	0	2	2	0	3	Advance to Semi-finals
(China) Dalian Shide	3	0	2	1	1	3	−2	2	
(Japan) Kashima Antlers	3	0	2	1	1	3	−2	2	

17 February 2002 1	Dalian Shide (China)	0–0	(Japan) Kashima Antlers	Seogwipo, South Korea
		Report		Stadium: Jeju World Cup Stadium

19 February 2002 2	Kashima Antlers (Japan)	0–2	(South Korea) Suwon Samsung Bluewings	Seogwipo, South Korea
		Report	Seo Jung-won 55'; Son Dae-ho 82'	Stadium: Jeju World Cup Stadium

21 February 2002 3	Anyang LG Cheetahs (South Korea)	1–1	(Japan) Kashima Antlers	Seogwipo, South Korea
	André 90'	Report	Motoyama 54'	Stadium: Jeju World Cup Stadium

=== Other friendlies ===
23 May 2002	Kashima Antlers (Japan)	1–5	Argentina	Naraha, Fukushima
	Nozawa 47'	Report	Pochettino 7'; Batistuta 49', 60', 81', 83'	Stadium: J-Village Stadium

== Player statistics ==
No.	Pos.	Player	D.o.B. (Age)	Height / Weight	J.League 1		Emperor's Cup		J.League Cup		Total	
No.	Pos.	Player	D.o.B. (Age)	Height / Weight	Apps	Goals	Apps	Goals	Apps	Goals	Apps	Goals
1	GK	Shinya Kato	September 19, 1980 (aged 21)	cm / kg	0	0						
2	DF	Akira Narahashi	November 26, 1971 (aged 30)	cm / kg	25	1						
3	DF	Yutaka Akita	August 6, 1970 (aged 31)	cm / kg	29	4						
4	DF	Fabiano	August 4, 1975 (aged 26)	cm / kg	19	0						
5	MF	Kōji Nakata	July 9, 1979 (aged 22)	cm / kg	29	6						
6	MF	Yasuto Honda	June 25, 1969 (aged 32)	cm / kg	22	0						
8	MF	Mitsuo Ogasawara	April 5, 1979 (aged 22)	cm / kg	27	4						
9	FW	Tomoyuki Hirase	May 23, 1977 (aged 24)	cm / kg	7	2						
10	MF	Masashi Motoyama	June 20, 1979 (aged 22)	cm / kg	24	3						
11	FW	Yoshiyuki Hasegawa	February 11, 1969 (aged 33)	cm / kg	25	3						
13	FW	Atsushi Yanagisawa	May 27, 1977 (aged 24)	cm / kg	27	7						
14	DF	Kenji Haneda	December 1, 1981 (aged 20)	cm / kg	0	0						
15	DF	Seiji Kaneko	May 27, 1980 (aged 21)	cm / kg	3	0						
16	MF	Augusto	November 5, 1968 (aged 33)	cm / kg	29	4						
17	DF	Jun Uchida	October 14, 1977 (aged 24)	cm / kg	20	1						
18	MF	Koji Kumagai	October 23, 1975 (aged 26)	cm / kg	19	2						
20	DF	Tomohiko Ikeuchi	November 1, 1977 (aged 24)	cm / kg	14	1						
21	GK	Hitoshi Sogahata	August 2, 1979 (aged 22)	cm / kg	30	0						
22	DF	Tatsuya Ishikawa	December 25, 1979 (aged 22)	cm / kg	6	1						
23	MF	Masashi Otani	April 17, 1983 (aged 18)	cm / kg	0	0						
24	MF	Takeshi Aoki	September 28, 1982 (aged 19)	cm / kg	13	0						
25	MF	Takuya Nozawa	August 12, 1981 (aged 20)	cm / kg	13	0						
27	FW	Kosei Nakamura	April 5, 1981 (aged 20)	cm / kg	1	0						
28	GK	Shinichi Shuto	June 8, 1983 (aged 18)	cm / kg	0	0						
29	GK	Riki Takasaki	July 11, 1970 (aged 31)	cm / kg	0	0						
30	FW	Takayuki Suzuki	June 5, 1976 (aged 25)	cm / kg	8	0						
31	FW	Euller	March 15, 1971 (aged 30)	cm / kg	14	7						
32	DF	Junji Nishizawa	May 10, 1974 (aged 27)	cm / kg	7	0						

== Other pages ==
- (in Japanese) J. League official site
