= 2004 Kashima Antlers season =

Kashima Antlers
2004 season
- Manager: Toninho Cerezo
- Stadium: Kashima Soccer Stadium
- J. League 1: 6th
- Emperor's Cup: Quarterfinals
- J. League Cup: Quarterfinals
- Top goalscorer: Mitsuo Ogasawara (7)
Home colours	Away colours

During the 2004 season, Kashima Antlers competed in the J. League 1, in which they finished 6th.

== Competitions ==
Competitions	Position
J. League 1	6th / 16 clubs
Emperor's Cup	Quarterfinals
J. League Cup	Quarterfinals

== Domestic results ==
=== J. League 1 ===
==== League table ====
Pos	Team	Pld	W	D	L	GF	GA	GD	Pts	Qualification
4	JEF United Ichihara	30	13	11	6	55	45	+10	50	
5	Júbilo Iwata	30	14	6	10	54	44	+10	48	Qualification for AFC Champions League 2005 group stage (Note: Júbilo Iwata qualified to 2005 ACL as 2003 Emperor's Cup winners.)
6	Kashima Antlers	30	14	6	10	41	31	+10	48	
7	Nagoya Grampus Eight	29	12	8	9	49	43	+6	44	
8	FC Tokyo	30	10	11	9	40	41	−1	41	

Updated to match(es) played on November 28, 2004. Source: J. League Division 1 first stage, J. League Division 1 second stage
Rules for classification: 1) points; 2) goal difference; 3) number of goals scored.

==== Matches ====
Match	Date	Venue	Opponents	Score
1–1	13 March 2004	Kashima Soccer Stadium	Gamba Osaka	1–1
1–2	20 March 2004	Nihondaira Sports Stadium	Shimizu S-Pulse	1–2
1–3	4 April 2004	Kashima Soccer Stadium	Nagoya Grampus Eight	3–2
1–4	10 April 2004	Ichihara Seaside Stadium	JEF United Ichihara	2–1
1–5	14 April 2004	Kashima Soccer Stadium	Albirex Niigata	2–2
1–6	17 April 2004	Osaka Nagai Stadium	Cerezo Osaka	1–0
1–7	2 May 2004	Kashima Soccer Stadium	Vissel Kobe	2–0
1–8	5 May 2004	Saitama Stadium 2002	Urawa Red Diamonds	1–0
1–9	9 May 2004	Kashima Soccer Stadium	Oita Trinita	3–0
1–10	15 May 2004	National Stadium	Kashiwa Reysol	0–1
1–11	22 May 2004	Kashima Soccer Stadium	FC Tokyo	0–0
1–12	13 June 2004	Hiroshima Big Arch	Sanfrecce Hiroshima	0–2
1–13	16 June 2004	Ajinomoto Stadium	Tokyo Verdy 1969	3–0
1–14	19 June 2004	Kashima Soccer Stadium	Júbilo Iwata	1–0
1–15	26 June 2004	International Stadium Yokohama	Yokohama F. Marinos	1–0
2–1	14 August 2004	Kashima Soccer Stadium	Kashiwa Reysol	1–0
2–2	21 August 2004	Osaka Expo '70 Stadium	Gamba Osaka	2–1
2–3	29 August 2004	Kashima Soccer Stadium	JEF United Ichihara	0–1
2–4	11 September 2004	Kashima Soccer Stadium	Cerezo Osaka	4–3
2–5	18 September 2004	Shizuoka Stadium	Júbilo Iwata	4–4
2–6	23 September 2004	Kashima Soccer Stadium	Shimizu S-Pulse	0–0
2–7	26 September 2004	Ajinomoto Stadium	FC Tokyo	0–1
2–8	3 October 2004	Kashima Soccer Stadium	Sanfrecce Hiroshima	0–0
2–9	17 October 2004	Niigata Stadium	Albirex Niigata	1–0
2–10	23 October 2004	Kashima Soccer Stadium	Urawa Red Diamonds	2–3
2–11	30 October 2004	Kashima Soccer Stadium	Yokohama F. Marinos	3–1
2–12	7 November 2004	Kobe Wing Stadium	Vissel Kobe	2–1
2–13	20 November 2004	Oita Stadium	Oita Trinita	0–3
2–14	23 November 2004	Kashima Soccer Stadium	Tokyo Verdy 1969	1–0
2–15	28 November 2004	Toyota Stadium	Nagoya Grampus Eight	0–2

=== Emperor's Cup ===
Match	Date	Venue	Opponents	Score
4th Round	13 November 2004	Mito Stadium	Mito HollyHock	0–1
5th Round	12 December 2004	Kashima Soccer Stadium	Kawasaki Frontale	3–2 a.e.t. (sudden death)
Quarterfinals	19 December 2004	Tottori Stadium	Gamba Osaka	0–1

=== J. League Cup ===
Match	Date	Venue	Opponents	Score
GL-D-1	27 March 2004	Ajinomoto Stadium	FC Tokyo	1–2
GL-D-2	29 April 2004	Kashima Soccer Stadium	FC Tokyo	1–2
GL-D-3	29 May 2004	Kobe Wing Stadium	Vissel Kobe	0–3
GL-D-4	5 June 2004	Kashima Soccer Stadium	Kashiwa Reysol	0–2
GL-D-5	17 July 2004	Hitachi Kashiwa Soccer Stadium	Kashiwa Reysol	0–0
GL-D-6	24 July 2004	Kashima Soccer Stadium	Vissel Kobe	2–0
Quarterfinals	4 September 2004	Mizuho Athletic Stadium	Nagoya Grampus Eight	2–1

== Player statistics ==
No.	Pos.	Player	D.o.B. (Age)	Height / Weight	J. League 1		Emperor's Cup		J. League Cup		Total	
No.	Pos.	Player	D.o.B. (Age)	Height / Weight	Apps	Goals	Apps	Goals	Apps	Goals	Apps	Goals
1	GK	Hideaki Ozawa	17 March 1974 (aged 29)	cm / kg	4	0						
2	DF	Akira Narahashi	26 November 1971 (aged 32)	cm / kg	12	0						
3	DF	Seiji Kaneko	27 May 1980 (aged 23)	cm / kg	22	3						
4	DF	Go Oiwa	23 June 1972 (aged 31)	cm / kg	29	0						
5	MF	Kōji Nakata	9 July 1979 (aged 24)	cm / kg	21	1						
6	MF	Yasuto Honda	25 June 1969 (aged 34)	cm / kg	7	0						
7	DF	Toru Araiba	12 July 1979 (aged 24)	cm / kg	28	1						
8	MF	Mitsuo Ogasawara	5 April 1979 (aged 24)	cm / kg	28	7						
9	FW	Fábio Júnior	22 November 1977 (aged 26)	cm / kg	13	1						
10	MF	Masashi Motoyama	20 June 1979 (aged 24)	cm / kg	24	3						
11	FW	Masaki Fukai	13 September 1980 (aged 23)	cm / kg	20	3						
14	DF	Kenji Haneda	1 December 1981 (aged 22)	cm / kg	0	0						
15	DF	Daiki Iwamasa	30 January 1982 (aged 22)	cm / kg	18	4						
16	MF	Fernando	18 June 1978 (aged 25)	cm / kg	26	5						
17	DF	Jun Uchida	14 October 1977 (aged 26)	cm / kg	17	0						
18	MF	Koji Kumagai	23 October 1975 (aged 28)	cm / kg	7	0						
18	FW	Baron	19 January 1974 (aged 30)	cm / kg	12	2						
19	FW	Tomoyuki Hirase	23 May 1977 (aged 26)	cm / kg	11	0						
20	DF	Tomohiko Ikeuchi	1 November 1977 (aged 26)	cm / kg	5	0						
21	GK	Hitoshi Sogahata	2 August 1979 (aged 24)	cm / kg	27	0						
22	DF	Tatsuya Ishikawa	25 December 1979 (aged 24)	cm / kg	12	2						
23	MF	Masashi Otani	17 April 1983 (aged 20)	cm / kg	2	0						
24	MF	Takeshi Aoki	28 September 1982 (aged 21)	cm / kg	20	0						
25	MF	Takuya Nozawa	12 August 1981 (aged 22)	cm / kg	16	2						
26	MF	Chikashi Masuda	19 June 1985 (aged 18)	cm / kg	8	2						
27	FW	Yuki Nakashima	16 June 1984 (aged 19)	cm / kg	10	0						
28	GK	Shinichi Shuto	8 June 1983 (aged 20)	cm / kg	0	0						
29	GK	Tetsu Sugiyama	26 June 1981 (aged 22)	cm / kg	0	0						
30	FW	Takayuki Suzuki	5 June 1976 (aged 27)	cm / kg	14	5						
31	FW	Kohei Tanaka	11 December 1985 (aged 18)	cm / kg	0	0						

== Other pages ==
- (in Japanese) J. League official site
