= Claudecir (footballer, born 1975) =

Brazilian footballer

Personal information
- Full name: Claudecir Aparecido de Aguiar
- Date of birth: 15 October 1975 (age 51)
- Place of birth: Agudos, Brazil
- Height: 1.89 m (6 ft 2 1/2 in)
- Position: Midfielder

Senior career*
| Years | Team | Apps | (Gls) |
| 1996–1999 | Noroeste | | |
| 1996 | → Mogi Mirim (loan) | | |
| 1999–2001 | São Caetano | 8 | (0) |
| 2001–2007 | Palmeiras | 22 | (3) |
| 2002 | → São Caetano (loan) | 24 | (8) |
| 2003 | → Kashima Antlers (loan) | 8 | (2) |
| 2004 | → São Caetano (loan) | | |
| 2005–2006 | São Caetano | 24 | (7) |
| 2007–2008 | Portuguesa | 8 | (0) |
| 2009 | Villa Nova | 1 | (0) |
| 2011 | XV de Jaú | 13 | (6) |
- * Club domestic league appearances and goals

Claudecir Aparecido de Aguiar (born 15 October 1975), known as Claudecir, is a Brazilian former professional footballer.

After beginning his career with Noroeste, he subsequently enjoyed a successful spell with São Caetano, before being signed by Palmeiras in 2002. Having struggled with knee injuries for most of his career, Claudecir had a decline in form after his first stint with the Azulão.

Claudecir now has a social football project called Cidadão do Amanhã in Igaraçu do Tietê, and also plays for the Palmeiras Masters team.

== Club statistics ==
| Club performance | | | League | | Cup | | League Cup | | Total | |
| Season | Club | League | Apps | Goals | Apps | Goals | Apps | Goals | Apps | Goals |
| Japan | | | League | | Emperor's Cup | | J.League Cup | | Total | |
|---|---|---|---|---|---|---|---|---|---|---|
| 2003 | Kashima Antlers | J1 League | 8 | 2 | 0 | 0 | 0 | 0 | 8 | 2 |
| Total | | | 8 | 2 | 0 | 0 | 0 | 0 | 8 | 2 |
