= Euller (footballer, born 1971) =

Brazilian footballer

Personal information
- Full name: Euller Elias de Carvalho
- Date of birth: March 15, 1971 (age 55)
- Place of birth: Felixlândia, Brazil
- Height: 1.71 m (5 ft 7 1/2 in)
- Positions: Second striker; winger

Senior career*
Years	Team	Apps	(Gls)
1988–1993	América-MG	13	(5)
1994–1995	São Paulo	12	(1)
1995–1997	Atlético Mineiro	42	(11)
1997	Palmeiras	29	(6)
1998	Verdy Kawasaki	16	(12)
1998–2000	Palmeiras	10	(0)
2000–2001	Vasco da Gama	22	(8)
2002–2003	Kashima Antlers	36	(11)
2004	São Caetano	35	(3)
2005	Atlético Mineiro	27	(7)
2006–2007	América-MG		
2007	Tupynambás		
2008–2011	América-MG	13	(2)

International career
2000–2001	Brazil	7	(3)
- * Club domestic league appearances and goals

Euller Elias de Carvalho (born March 15, 1971) is a Brazilian retired football player at the position of striker. Throughout his career, he was nicknamed "The Son of the Wind" (in Portuguese: "O Filho do Vento") for his exceptional pace.

Euller played for several clubs in the Campeonato Brasileiro, including América-MG, São Paulo, Atlético Mineiro, Palmeiras, Vasco da Gama and São Caetano.

Euller also spent two seasons playing for Kashima Antlers in the J1 League.

== Career statistics ==
=== Club ===
Club performance			League		Cup		League Cup		Total	
Season	Club	League	Apps	Goals	Apps	Goals	Apps	Goals	Apps	Goals
Brazil			League		Copa do Brasil		League Cup		Total	
1991	América-MG	Série B	0	0					0	0
1992	América-MG	Série B	0	0					0	0
1993	América-MG	Série A	13	5					13	5
1994	São Paulo	Série A	12	1					12	1
1995	Atlético Mineiro	Série A	20	2					20	2
1996	Atlético Mineiro	Série A	22	9					22	9
1997	Palmeiras	Série A	29	6					29	6
Japan			League		Emperor's Cup		J.League Cup		Total	
1998	Verdy Kawasaki	J1 League	16	12	0	0	0	0	16	12
Brazil			League		Copa do Brasil		League Cup		Total	
1999	Palmeiras	Série A	10	0					10	0
2000	Vasco da Gama	Série A	8	1					8	1
2001	Vasco da Gama	Série A	14	7					14	7
2002	Vasco da Gama	Série A	0	0					0	0
Japan			League		Emperor's Cup		J.League Cup		Total	
2002	Kashima Antlers	J1 League	14	7	5	4	2	2	21	13
2003	Kashima Antlers	J1 League	22	4	0	0	3	1	25	5
Brazil			League		Copa do Brasil		League Cup		Total	
2004	São Caetano	Série A	35	3					35	3
2005	Atlético Mineiro	Série A	27	7					27	7
Country	Brazil		190	41					190	41
Country	Japan		52	23	5	4	5	3	62	30
Total			242	64	5	4	5	3	252	71

=== International ===
Brazil national team
Year	Apps	Goals
2000	1	1
2001	6	2
Total	7	3

== Honours ==
América-MG

- Minas Gerais State Championship: 1993
- Brazilian Série C: 2009

São Paulo

- Recopa Sudamericana: 1994

Atlético Mineiro

- Minas Gerais State Championship: 1995

Palmeiras

- Copa Libertadores: 1999
- Rio-São Paulo Tournament: 2000
- Intercontinental Cup runner-up: 1999

Vasco da Gama

- Mercosur Cup: 2000
- Brazilian Série A: 2000

Kashima Antlers

- J. League Cup: 2002
- A3 Champions Cup: 2003

São Caetano

- São Paulo State Championship: 2004
