= Fernando (footballer, born 1978) =

Brazilian footballer

Personal information
- Full name: Fernando Almeida de Oliveira
- Date of birth: 18 June 1978 (age 48)
- Place of birth: Bahia, Brazil
- Height: 1.81 m (5 ft 11 1/2 in)
- Position: Midfielder

Senior career*
Years	Team	Apps	(Gls)
1996–2002	Vitória		
2003–2006	Kashima Antlers		
2007	Cruzeiro		
2008	Al-Shabab Riyadh		
2008	Atlético Paranaense		
2009	Al-Ahly Doha		
2010	Vitória		
- * Club domestic league appearances and goals

Fernando Almeida de Oliveira (born 18 June 1978), known as just Fernando, is a Brazilian former football player.

== Club statistics ==
Club performance			League		Cup		League Cup		Continental		Total	
Season	Club	League	Apps	Goals	Apps	Goals	Apps	Goals	Apps	Goals	Apps	Goals
Brazil			League		Copa do Brasil		League Cup		South America		Total	
1996	Vitória	Série A	2	0							2	0
1997	Vitória	Série A	1	0							1	0
1998	Vitória	Série A	1	0							1	0
1999	Vitória	Série A	21	3							21	3
2000	Vitória	Série A	11	0							11	0
2001	Vitória	Série A	18	4							18	4
2002	Vitória	Série A	21	5							21	5
Japan			League		Emperor's Cup		J.League Cup		Asia		Total	
2003	Kashima Antlers	J1 League	27	5	4	0	4	1	3	2	38	8
2004	Kashima Antlers	J1 League	26	5	3	0	7	1	-		36	6
2005	Kashima Antlers	J1 League	30	2	2	1	2	2	-		34	5
2006	Kashima Antlers	J1 League	19	7	0	0	3	1	-		22	8
Brazil			League		Copa do Brasil		League Cup		South America		Total	
2007	Cruzeiro	Série A	2	0							2	0
Total	Brazil		77	12							77	12
Total	Japan		102	19	9	1	16	5	3	2	130	27
Career total			179	31	9	1	16	5	3	2	207	39
