= 2013 Kashima Antlers season =

Kashima Antlers
2013 season
- President: Fumiaki Koizumi
- Manager: Toninho Cerezo
- Stadium: Kashima Soccer Stadium
- J1 League: 5th
- Emperors Cup: Round of 16
- J.League Cup: 1st Round
- Top goalscorer: League: Yūya Ōsako (19); All: Yūya Ōsako (22)
- Average home league attendance: 16,419

The 2013 season was Kashima Antlers 10th season in the J1 League. They got to the 4th round of the Emperors Cup and the 1st round of the J.League Cup, and ended up finishing 5th in the league.

== Final league table ==
Pos	Team	Pld	W	D	L	GF	GA	GD	Pts	Qualification or relegation
3	Kawasaki Frontale	34	18	6	10	65	51	+14	60	Qualification for 2014 AFC Champions League group stage (Note: The winners of the 2013 Emperor's Cup qualify for the group stage of the 2014 AFC Champions League. As the Emperor's Cup winners were Yokohama F. Marinos, who had already qualified to ACL through the championship, the remaining spot was awarded to the fourth-placed team.)
4	Cerezo Osaka	34	16	11	7	53	32	+21	59	Qualification for 2014 AFC Champions League group stage
5	Kashima Antlers	34	18	5	11	60	52	+8	59	
6	Urawa Red Diamonds	34	17	7	10	66	56	+10	58	
7	Albirex Niigata	34	17	4	13	48	42	+6	55	

Updated to match(es) played on 7 December 2013. Source: J.League Division 1
Rules for classification: 1) points; 2) goal difference; 3) number of goals scored.

== Squad ==
Note: Flags indicate national team as defined under FIFA eligibility rules; some limited exceptions apply. Players may hold more than one non-FIFA nationality.

No.	Pos.	Nation	Player
1	GK	JPN	Akihiro Sato
21	GK	JPN	Hitoshi Sogahata
29	GK	JPN	Shinichiro Kawamata
3	DF	JPN	Daiki Iwamasa
5	DF	JPN	Takeshi Aoki
15	DF	JPN	Gen Shōji
17	DF	JPN	Takanori Maeno
22	DF	JPN	Daigo Nishi
23	DF	JPN	Naomichi Ueda
24	DF	JPN	Yukitoshi Ito
4	MF	JPN	Kazuya Yamamura
6	MF	JPN	Koji Nakata
10	MF	JPN	Masashi Motomora
13	MF	JPN	Atsutaka Nakamura

No.	Pos.	Nation	Player
16	MF	JPN	Takuya Honda
20	MF	JPN	Gaku Shibasaki
25	MF	JPN	Yasushi Endo
27	MF	JPN	Takehide Umebachi
28	MF	JPN	Shoma Doi
35	MF	JPN	Takuya Nozawa
40	MF	JPN	Mitsuo Ogasawara
8	FW	BRA	Juninho
9	FW	JPN	Yuya Ōsako
11	FW	BRA	Davi
18	FW	JPN	Yoshiki Nashagawa
19	FW	JPN	Yuta Toyakawa
36	FW	JPN	Shuhei Akasaki

== Results ==
=== J1 League ===
2 March 2013 1	Sagan Tosu	1–1	Kashima Antlers	Tosu, Saga
14:00 JST	Yohei Toyada 71'		Yuya Osako 32'	Stadium: Ekimae Real Estate Stadium; Attendance: 12,728; Referee: Hiroyuki Kimura

9 March 2013 2	Kashima Antlers	3–2	Vegalta Sendai	Kashima
14:00 JST	Davi 29', 48'; Yuya Osako 47'		Yoshiaki Ota 46'; Wilson 67'	Stadium: Kashima Soccer Stadium; Attendance: 19,981; Referee: Yuichi Nishimura

17 March 2013 3	Sanfrecce Hiroshima	0–0	Kashima Antlers	Hiroshima
13:00 JST				Stadium: Edion Stadium Hiroshima; Attendance: 16,029; Referee: Kenji Ogiya

30 March 2013 4	Omiya Ardija	3–1	Kashima Antlers	Saitama
15:00 JST	Shin Kanazawa 36'; Milivoje Novakovic 53'; Takamitsu Tomiyama 79'		Davi 15'	Stadium: NACK5 Stadium Omiya; Attendance: 11,492; Referee: Minoru Tojo

6 April 2013 5	Kashima Antlers	1–0	Cerezo Osaka	Kashima
16:oo JST	Yasushi Endo 58'			Stadium: Kashima Soccer Stadium; Attendance: 10,837; Referee: Futoshi Nakamura

13 April 2013 6	Oita Trinita	2–3	Kashima Antlers	Oita
15:00 JST	Daiki Takematsu 25'; Yasuhito Morishima 68'		Gaku Shibasaki 36'; Takuya Nozawa 57'; Yuya Osako 90'	Stadium: Showa Denko Dome Oita; Attendance: 10,571; Referee: Ryuji Sato

20 April 2013 7	Kashima Antlers	0–0	Ventforet Kofu	Kashima
20:00 JST				Stadium: Kashima Soccer Stadium; Attendance: 9,898; Referee: Masaaki Iemoto

27 April 2013 8	Albirex Niigata	2–3	Kashima Antlers	Niigata City
15:00 JST	Sho Naruoka 67'; Kentaro Oi 90+3'		Gaku Shibasaki 6'; Davi 56'; Kazuya Yamamura 78'	Stadium: Denka Big Swan Stadium; Attendance: 23,578; Referee: Takuto Okabe

3 May 2013 9	Yokohama F. Marinos	1–1	Kashima Antlers	Yokohama
16:30 JST	Fabio 90+5'		Takuya Nozawa 73'	Stadium: Nissan Stadium; Attendance: 40,034; Referee: Hiroyuki Kimura

6 May 2013 10	Kashima Antlers	1–0	Shonan Bellmare	Kashima
17:00 JST	Davi 31'			Stadium: Kashima Soccer Stadium; Attendance: 16,411; Referee: Yuichi Nishimura

11 May 2013 11	Urawa Red Diamonds	3–1	Kashima Antlers	Midori-ku, Saitama
20:00 JST	Daisuke Nasu 66'; Shinzo Koroki 78'; Tsukasa Umesaki 89'		Takuya Nozawa 63'	Stadium: Saitama Stadium 2002; Attendance: 46,649; Referee: Ryuji Sato

18 May 2013 12	Kashima Antlers	3–1	Nagoya Grampus	Kashima
15:00	Yasushi Endo 40'; Atsutaka Nakamura 66'; Yuya Osako 90+4'		Yoshizumi Ogawa 24'	Stadium: Kashima Soccer Stadium; Attendance: 17,161; Referee: Masaaki Iemoto

25 May 2013 13	Kashima Antlers	3–2	FC Tokyo	Kashima
18:00 JST	Yuya Osako 47', 65'; Hyeon-su Jang 56' (OG.)		Tadanari Lee 7'; Kazuma Watanabe 44'	Stadium: Kashima Soccer Stadium; Attendance: 17,969; Referee: Jumpei Iida

6 July 2013 14	Kawasaki Frontale	4–2	Kashima Antlers	Kawasaki
20:00 JST	Renatinho 7'; Yoshito Okubo 36', 51'; Kengo Nakamura 44'		Yuya Osako 38'; Takehide Umebachi 87'	Stadium: Kawasaki Todoroki Stadium; Attendance: 18,447; Referee: Takuya Maeda

10 July 2013 15	Kashima Antlers	3–1	Shimizu S-Pulse	Kashima
20:00 JST	Juninho 32'; Takeshi Aoki 80'; Takuya Nozawa 84'		Sho Ito 19'	Stadium: Kashima Soccer Stadium; Attendance: 7,495; Referee: Hiroyoshi Takayama

13 July 2013 16	Kashiwa Reysol	2–1	Kashima Antlers	Kashiwa
20:00 JST	Cléo 67', 90+2'		Davi 42'	Stadium: Sankyo Frontier Kashiwa Stadium; Attendance: 25,904; Referee: Yoshiro Imamura

17 July 2013 17	Kashima Antlers	1–1	Júbilo Iwata	Kashima
20:00 JST	Davi 65'		Hidetaka Kanazono 78'	Stadium: Kashima Soccer Stadium; Attendance: 6,681; Referee: Masaaki Iemoto

31 July 2013 18	Nagoya Grampus	3–1	Kashima Antlers	Toyota
20:30 JST	Joshua Kennedy 10' (pen.), 76'; Keiji Tamada 41'		Yuya Osako 90+3'	Stadium: Toyota Stadium; Attendance: 15,881; Referee: Yuichi Nishimura

3 August 2013 19	Kashima Antlers	1–0	Omiya Ardija	Kashima
19:30 JST	Yasushi Endo 50'			Stadium: Kashima Soccer Stadium; Attendance: 14,925; Referee: Toshimitsu Yoshida

10 August 2013 20	Vegalta Sendai	2–1	Kashima Antlers	Sendai
20:00 JST	Atsushi Yanagisawa 35'; Heberty 81'		Atsutaka Nakamura 23'	Stadium: Yurtec Stadium Sendai; Attendance: 17,892; Referee: Minoru Tojo

17 August 2013 21	Kashima Antlers	1–0	Albirex Niigata	Kashima
19:30 JST	Yuya Osako 88'			Stadium: Kashima Soccer Stadium; Attendance: 16,392; Referee: Kenji Ogiya

24 August 2013 22	Kashima Antlers	2–1	Yokohama F. Marinos	Kashima
20:00 JST	Yuya Osako 69', 78'		Marquinhos 19'	Stadium: Kashima Soccer Stadium; Attendance: 17,608; Referee: Hajime Matsuo

28 August 2013 23	Shimizu S-Pulse	4–3	Kashima Antlers	Shizuoka
20:00 JST	Dzenan Radoncic 31'; Toshiyuki Takagi 45', 49', 88'		Yuya Osako 1', 68'; Kazuya Yamamura 6'	Stadium: IAI Stadium Nihondaira; Attendance: 9,238; Referee: Jumpei Iida

31 August 2013 24	Kashima Antlers	3–1	Kashiwa Reysol	Kashima
19:30 JST	Yuya Osako 3'; Juninho 14', 66'		Masato Kudo 53'	Stadium: Kashima Soccer Stadium; Attendance: 16,212; Referee: Itaru Hirose

14 September 2013 25	Ventforet Kofu	3–0	Kashima Antlers	Kofu
19:30 JST	Yoshifumi Kashiwa 7'; Sho Sasaki 31'; Patric 44'			Stadium: Yamanashi Chuo Bank Stadium; Attendance: 15,137; Referee: Hiroyuki Kimura

21 September 2013 26	Júbilo Iwata	2–3	Kashima Antlers	Iwata
15:00 JST	Seong-dong Baek 81'; Yoshiro Abe 90+2'		Shoma Doi 4'; Davi 62'; Takahide Umebachi 75'	Stadium: Yamaha Stadium; Attendance: 10,821; Referee: Kenji Ogiya

28 September 2013 27	Kashima Antlers	3–1	Oita Trinita	Kashima
16:30 JST	Yasushi Endo 55', 60'; Davi 87'		Yasuhito Morishima 52'	Stadium: Kashima Soccer Stadium; Attendance: 13,020; Referee: Yoshiro Imamura

5 October 2013 28	FC Tokyo	1–4	Kashima Antlers	Tokyo
20:00 JST	Sota Hirayama 86'		Yasushi Endo 6'; Davi 9'; Mitsuo Ogasawara 67'; Yuya Osako 81'	Stadium: Ajinomoto Stadium; Attendance: 30,673; Referee: Itaru Hirose

19 October 2019 29	Kashima Antlers	1–2	Urawa Red Diamonds	Kashima
16:00 JST	Yuya Osako 87'		Daisuke Naso 20'; Genki Hariguchi 71'	Stadium: Kashima Soccer Stadium; Attendance: 32,305; Referee: Hajime Matsuo

27 October 2013 30	Kashima Antlers	4–1	Kawasaki Frontale	Kashima
16:00 JST	Shoma Doi 20'; Yuya Osako 44'; Kazuya Yamamura 56'; Yasushi Endo 61'		Gaku Shibasaki 90+1' (OG.)	Stadium: Kashima Soccer Stadium; Attendance: 18,293; Referee: Nobutsugu Murakami

10 November 2013 31	Shonan Bellmare	1–2	Kashima Antlers	Hiratsuka
13:00 JST	Wataru Endo 90+1'		Mitsuo Ogasawara 37'; Yuya Osako 90+2'	Stadium: Shonan BMW Stadium Hiratsuka; Attendance: 11,736; Referee: Takuya Maeda

23 November 2013 32	Kashima Antlers	1–2	Sagan Tosu	Kashima
14:00 JST	Takeshi Aoki 84'		Min-uh Kim 64', 90+5'	Stadium: Kashima Soccer Stadium; Attendance: 17,030; Referee: Itaru Hirose

30 November 2013 33	Cerezo Osaka	1–2	Kashima Antlers	Osaka
14:00 JST	Yoichiro Kakitani 38'		Yuya Osako 25'; Atsutaka Nakamura 85'	Stadium: Yanmar Stadium Nagai; Attendance: 36,361; Referee: Kenji Ogiya

7 December 2013 34	Kashima Antlers	0–2	Sanfrecce Hiroshima	Kashima
15:30 JST				Stadium: Kashima Soccer Stadium; Attendance: 26,897; Referee: Minoru Tojo

=== Emperors Cup ===
7 September 2013 2nd Round	Kashima Antlers	3–0	Sony Sendai	Kashima
21:00 JST	Kazuya Yamamura 81'; Takuya Nozawa 89'; Yasushi Endo 90+4'			Stadium: Kashima Soccer Stadium; Attendance: 3,194; Referee: tbc

14 October 2013 3rd Round	Kashima Antlers	2–1	Kyoto Sanga	Kashima
21:00 JST	Yasushi Endo 54'; Davi 67'		Shigeru Yoketani 75'	Stadium: Kashima Soccer Stadium; Attendance: 5,574; Referee: tbc

16 November 2013 Round of 16	Kashima Antlers	1–3	Sanfrecce Hiroshima	Kashima
21:00 JST	Yukitoshi Ito 79'		Yojiro Takahagi 28', 45+1'; Tsukasa Shiotani 41'	Stadium: Kashima Soccer Stadium; Attendance: 5,710; Referee: tbc

=== J.League Cup ===
23 March 2013 Group B–Match 1	Kashima Antlers	2–4	FC Tokyo	Kashima
16:00 JST	Yuya Osako 28'; Davi 78'		Kazuma Watanabe 45+1'; Lucas 57'; Tadanari Lee 77'; Keigo Higashi 81'	Stadium: Kashima Soccer Stadium; Attendance: 11,839; Referee: Yudai Yamamoto

3 April 2013 Group B–Match 2	Kashima Antlers	1–0	Sagan Tosu	Kashima
20:00 JST	Masashi Motoyama 90+1'			Stadium: Kashima Soccer Stadium; Attendance: 5,070; Referee: Nobutsugu Murakami

10 April 2013 Group B–Match 3	Albirex Niigata	1–2	Kashima Antlers	Niigata City
20:00 JST	Kengo Kawamata 86'		Davi 29', 41'	Stadium: Denka Big Swan Stadium; Attendance: 7,210; Referee: Jumpei Iida

24 April 2013 Group B–Match 4	Kashima Antlers	1–0	Nagoya Grampus	Kashima
20:00 JST	Juninho 23'			Stadium: Kashima Soccer Stadium; Attendance: 4,375; Referee: Hajime Matsuo

15 May 2013 Group B–Match 5	Oita Trinita	0–1	Kashima Antlers	Ōita
20:00 JST			Yuya Osako 90+5'	Stadium: Showa Denko Dome Oita; Attendance: 4,563; Referee: Koichiro Fukushima

22 May 2013 Group B–Match 6	Cerezo Osaka	2–1	Kashima Antlers	Osaka
20:00 JST	Edno 2'; Yoichiro Kakitani 36'		Davi 21'	Stadium: Yanmar Stadium Nagai; Attendance: 10,336; Referee: Takuto Okabe

23 June 2013 QF (1st leg)	Kashima Antlers	0–2	Yokohama F. Marinos	Kashima
19:00 JST			Shunsuke Nakamura 18'; Marquinhos 79'	Stadium: Kashima Soccer Stadium; Attendance: 13,099; Referee: Nobutsugu Murakami

30 June 2013 QF (2nd leg)	Yokohama F. Marinos	3–1	Kashima Antlers	Yokohama
20:00 JST	Manabu Saito 39'; Marquinhos 59'; Yuta Narawa 90'		Davi 65'	Stadium: Nissan Stadium; Attendance: 14,038; Referee: Kenji Ogiya

== Statistics ==
=== Overview ===
Competition	Record							
Competition	P	W	D	L	GF	GA	GD	Win %
J1 League	34	18	5	11	60	52	+8	52.94
Emperors Cup	3	2	0	1	6	4	+2	66.67
J-League Cup	8	4	0	4	3	4	−1	50.00
Total	45	24	5	16	69	60	+9	53.33

=== Goalscorers ===
Rank	Pos	No	Nat	Name	J1 League	Emperors Cup	J-League Cup	Total
1	FW	9	(Japan)	Yuya Ōsako	19	0	2	21
2	FW	11	(Brazil)	Davi	10	1	5	16
3	MF	25	(Japan)	Yasushi Endo	7	2	0	9
4	MF	35	(Japan)	Takuya Nozawa	4	1	0	5
5	MF	4	(Japan)	Kazuya Yamamura	3	1	0	4
5	FW	8	(Brazil)	Juninho	3	0	1	4
7	MF	13	(Japan)	Atsutaka Nakamura	3	0	0	3
8	MF	20	(Japan)	Gaku Shibasaki	2	0	0	2
8	MF	27	(Japan)	Takehide Umebachi	2	0	0	2
8	DF	5	(Japan)	Takeshi Aoki	2	0	0	2
8	MF	28	(Japan)	Shoma Doi	2	0	0	2
8	MF	40	(Japan)	Mitsuo Ogasawara	2	0	0	2
12	DF	24	(Japan)	Yukitoshi Ito	0	1	0	1
12	10	MF	(Japan)	Masashi Motomora	0	0	1	1
12	Own Goals				1	0	0	1
Totals					60	6	9	75

=== League position by matchday ===
Round	1	2	3	4	5	6	7	8	9	10	11	12	13	14	15	16	17	18	19	20	21	22	23	24	25	26	27	28	29	30	31	32	33	34
Ground	A	H	A	A	H	A	H	A	A	H	A	H	H	A	H	A	H	A	H	A	H	H	A	H	A	A	H	A	H	H	A	H	A	H
Result	D	W	D	L	W	W	D	W	D	W	L	W	W	L	W	L	D	L	W	L	W	W	L	W	L	W	W	W	L	W	W	L	W	L
Position	9	5	6	11	6	5	5	4	4	3	4	4	4	5	5	5	6	6	5	6	6	4	5	4	4	4	4	4	5	4	4	5	3	5

A = Away; H = Home; W = Win; D = Draw; L = Loss

=== Appearances and goals ===
No.	Pos	Nat	Player	Total		J1 League		Emperors Cup		J.League Cup	
No.	Pos	Nat	Player	Apps	Goals	Apps	Goals	Apps	Goals	Apps	Goals
Goalkeepers
21	GK	(Japan) JPN	Hitoshi Sogahata	43	0	34	0	6	0	3	0
1	GK	(Japan) JPN	Akihiro Sato	2	0	0	0	0	0	2	0
29	GK	(Japan) JPN	Shinichiro Kawamata	0	0	0	0	0	0	0	0
Defenders
3	DF	(Japan) JPN	Daiki Iwamasa	24	0	18	0	1	0	5	0
5	DF	(Japan) JPN	Takeshi Aoki	43	0	34	0	2	0	7	0
15	DF	(Japan) JPN	Gen Shōji	5	0	4	0	0	0	1	0
17	DF	(Japan) JPN	Takenori Maeno	25	0	20	0	1	0	4	0
22	DF	(Japan) JPN	Daigo Nishi	38	0	29	0	1	0	8	0
23	DF	(Japan) JPN	Naomichi Ueda	3	0	0	0	1	0	2	0
24	DF	(Japan) JPN	Yukitoshi Ito	8	1	6	0	2	1	0	0
Midfielders
4	MF	(Japan) JPN	Kazuya Yamamura	30	4	24	3	3	1	3	0
6	MF	(Japan) JPN	Koji Nakata	33	0	25	0	2	0	6	0
10	MF	(Japan) JPN	Masashi Motomora	34	1	24	0	3	0	7	1
13	MF	(Japan) JPN	Atsutaka Nakamura	24	3	16	3	2	0	6	0
16	MF	(Japan) JPN	Takuya Honda	10	0	7	0	0	0	3	0
20	MF	(Japan) JPN	Gaku Shibasaki	42	2	34	2	2	0	6	0
25	MF	(Japan) JPN	Yasushi Endo	38	9	28	7	3	2	7	0
27	MF	(Japan) JPN	Takehide Umebachi	14	2	10	2	2	0	2	0
28	MF	(Japan) JPN	Shoma Doi	18	2	15	2	2	0	1	0
35	MF	(Japan) JPN	Takuya Nozawa	33	5	23	4	2	1	8	0
40	MF	(Japan) JPN	Mitsuo Ogasawara	41	2	33	2	3	0	5	0
Forwards
8	FW	(Brazil) BRA	Juninho	38	4	30	3	3	0	5	1
9	FW	(Japan) JPN	Yuya Ōsako	41	21	33	19	1	0	7	2
11	FW	(Brazil) BRA	Davi	36	16	26	10	2	1	8	5
18	FW	(Japan) JPN	Yoshiki Nashagawa	1	0	0	0	1	0	0	0
19	FW	(Japan) JPN	Yuta Toyakawa	0	0	0	0	0	0	0	0
36	FW	(Japan) JPN	Shuhei Akasaki	2	1	1	0	1	1	0	0

== Transfers ==
=== In ===
Pos	Player	From	Fee	Date	Notes
FW	(Brazil) Davi	(Japan) Ventforet Kofu	Unknown	January 2013	
MF	(Japan) Daichi Kawashima	(Japan) Montedio Yamigata	Unknown	January 2013	
DF	(Japan) Takenori Maeno	(Japan) Ehime FC	Unknown	January 2013	
FW	(Japan) Atsutaka Nakamura	(Japan) Kyoto Sanga FC	Unknown	January 2013	
MF	(Japan) Takuya Nozawa	(Japan) Vissel Kobe	Unknown	January 2013	
MF	(Brazil) Renato Cajá	(Brazil) Ponte Preta	Unknown	July 2012	

=== Out ===
Pos	Player	To	Fee	Date	Notes
DF	(Brazil) Alex	(Japan) Tokushima Vortis	Unknown	December 2012	
DF	(Japan) Toru Araba	(Japan) Cerezo Osaka	Unknown	December 2012	
MF	(Brazil) Júnior Dutra	(Belgium) Sporting Lokeren	Unknown	December 2012	
FW	(Japan) Shinzo Koroki	(Japan) Urawa Red Diamonds	Unknown	December 2012	
MF	(Japan) Chikashi Masuda	(South Korea) Ulsan Hyundai	Unknown	December 2012	
FW	(Japan) Hideya Okamoto	(Japan) Albirex Niigata	Unknown	December 2012	
MF	(Brazil) Renato Cajá	(Brazil) Esporte Clube Vitória	Unknown	December 2012	
