= 2001 J.League Division 1 =

9th season of J1 League

J.League Division 1
- Season: 2001
- Champions: Kashima Antlers; 4th J.League title 4th Japanese title
- Promoted: Urawa Red Diamonds; Consadole Sapporo
- Relegated: Avispa Fukuoka; Cerezo Osaka
- AFC Champions League: Kashima Antlers; Shimizu S-Pulse (as Emperor's Cup winner)
- Matches: 240
- Goals: 788 (3.28 per match)
- Top goalscorer: Will (24 goals)
- Highest attendance: 60,553 – Reds vs. Marinos (13 October)
- Lowest attendance: 4,014 – JEF Utd. vs. Gamba (31 October)
- Average attendance: 16,548

The 2001 J.League Division 1 season was the ninth season since the establishment of the J.League Division 1. The league began on March 10 and ended on November 24. At the end of the season, the second stage winner Kashima Antlers won the Suntory Championship against Júbilo Iwata who won the first stage.

== Clubs ==
The following sixteen clubs participated in J.League Division 1 during 2001 season. Of these clubs, Consadole Sapporo and Urawa Red Diamonds were promoted from Division 2.

- Avispa Fukuoka
- Cerezo Osaka
- Consadole Sapporo
- FC Tokyo
- Gamba Osaka
- JEF United Ichihara
- Júbilo Iwata
- Kashima Antlers
- Kashiwa Reysol
- Nagoya Grampus Eight
- Sanfrecce Hiroshima
- Shimizu S-Pulse
- Tokyo Verdy 1969
- Urawa Red Diamonds
- Vissel Kobe
- Yokohama F. Marinos

=== Personnel ===
Club	Head coach
Avispa Fukuoka	(Argentina) Nestor Omar Piccoli
Cerezo Osaka	(Japan) Akihiro Nishimura
Consadole Sapporo	(Japan) Takeshi Okada
FC Tokyo	(Japan) Kiyoshi Okuma
Gamba Osaka	(Japan) Kazuhiko Takemoto
JEF United Ichihara	(Slovenia) Zdenko Verdenik
Júbilo Iwata	(Japan) Masakazu Suzuki
Kashima Antlers	(Brazil) Toninho Cerezo
Kashiwa Reysol	(England) Steve Perryman
Nagoya Grampus Eight	(Japan) Tetsuro Miura
Sanfrecce Hiroshima	(Russia) Valery Nepomnyashchy
Shimizu S-Pulse	(Federal Republic of Yugoslavia) Zdravko Zemunović
Tokyo Verdy 1969	(Japan) Yukitaka Omi
Urawa Red Diamonds	(Brazil) Pita
Vissel Kobe	(Japan) Ryoichi Kawakatsu
Yokohama F. Marinos	(Brazil) Sebastião Lazaroni

=== Foreign players ===
Club	Player 1	Player 2	Player 3	Non-visa foreign	Type-C contract	Former players
Avispa Fukuoka	(Argentina) Claudio Biaggio	(Argentina) David Bisconti	(South Korea) Noh Jung-yoon			(Argentina) Martín Vilallonga (Romania) Pavel Badea
Cerezo Osaka	(Brazil) Cláudio	(Brazil) Wágner	(South Korea) Yoon Jong-hwan			(Brazil) Marcelo Rosa (Brazil) Washington (South Korea) Kim Do-keun (South Korea) Noh Jung-yoon
Consadole Sapporo	(Brazil) Adalto	(Brazil) Biju	(Brazil) Will			(Brazil) Almir
FC Tokyo	(Brazil) Amaral	(Brazil) Kelly		(Brazil) Sandro		
Gamba Osaka	(Brazil) Reginaldo	(Croatia) Mirko Hrgović	(Croatia) Nino Bule			(French Guiana) Claude Dambury
JEF United Ichihara	(Bosnia and Herzegovina) Edin Mujčin	(Slovenia) Željko Milinovič	(South Korea) Choi Yong-soo	(South Korea) Kim Myung-hwi		
Júbilo Iwata	(Federal Republic of Yugoslavia) Aleksandar Živković	(Netherlands) Arno van Zwam				
Kashima Antlers	(Brazil) Augusto César	(Brazil) Bismarck	(Brazil) Fabiano			
Kashiwa Reysol	(South Korea) Hong Myung-bo	(South Korea) Hwang Sun-hong	(South Korea) Yoo Sang-chul			
Nagoya Grampus Eight	(Brazil) Marcelo Ramos	(Brazil) Ueslei	(Netherlands) Tarik Oulida	(Bolivia) Ko Ishikawa	(Brazil) Adriano Pimenta	(Federal Republic of Yugoslavia) Dragan Stojković
Sanfrecce Hiroshima	(Australia) Steve Corica	(Ukraine) Serhiy Skachenko	(Uzbekistan) Oleg Pashinin	(Brazil) Marcus Tulio Tanaka (North Korea) Ri Han-jae		(Australia) Tony Popovic
Shimizu S-Pulse	(Argentina) Fernando Oliva	(Brazil) Baron		(Brazil) Alex	(Brazil) Alair	
Tokyo Verdy 1969	(Brazil) Edmundo	(Brazil) Emerson	(Brazil) Marquinhos			
Urawa Red Diamonds	(Brazil) Adriano Gerlin	(Brazil) Emerson Sheik	(Brazil) Tuto		(Brazil) Harison	(Brazil) Donizete Oliveira
Vissel Kobe	(Brazil) Daniel	(Brazil) Santos	(Brazil) Sidiclei			
Yokohama F. Marinos	(Brazil) Dutra	(Brazil) Marco Brito	(Brazil) Nasa			(Brazil) Leandro Simioni (Uruguay) Marcelo Lipatín

== Overview ==
=== First stage ===
Pos	Team	Pld	W	OTW	D	OTL	L	GF	GA	GD	Pts	Qualification
1	Júbilo Iwata	15	9	4	1	1	0	32	12	+20	36	Qualification to the Suntory Championship
2	JEF United Ichihara	15	7	3	0	2	3	35	26	+9	27	
3	Nagoya Grampus Eight	15	5	5	2	0	3	29	20	+9	27	
4	Shimizu S-Pulse	15	6	4	0	2	3	28	18	+10	26	
5	Gamba Osaka	15	7	2	0	3	3	29	22	+7	25	
6	Kashiwa Reysol	15	6	2	0	2	5	29	23	+6	22	
7	Urawa Red Diamonds (Note: Promoted from 2000 J.League Division 2)	15	6	1	1	1	6	24	22	+2	21	
8	Consadole Sapporo	15	6	0	3	2	4	20	21	−1	21	
9	FC Tokyo	15	5	3	0	0	7	18	19	−1	21	
10	Vissel Kobe	15	5	1	2	3	4	16	20	−4	19	
11	Kashima Antlers (Note: Champion from 2000 J.League Division 1 and Cup-Winner 2000 Emperor's Cup)	15	5	1	1	3	5	21	23	−2	18	
12	Avispa Fukuoka	15	4	1	0	2	8	13	25	−12	14	
13	Sanfrecce Hiroshima	15	3	2	0	2	8	25	33	−8	13	
14	Cerezo Osaka	15	3	0	2	2	8	22	31	−9	11	
15	Yokohama F. Marinos	15	3	0	2	3	7	13	24	−11	11	
16	Tokyo Verdy 1969	15	2	2	0	3	8	16	31	−15	10	

Notes:

Results

Home \ Away	ANT	FMA	REY	JÚB	CER	GAM	TOK	SSP	GRA	VER	SFR	AVI	VIS	JEF	CON	RED
Kashima Antlers		2–0	3–2^{OT}	1–2				3–4^{OT}			2–1		2–0			0–3
Yokohama F. Marinos			0–2	1–2^{OT}			0–2	1–3			2–1		0–1^{OT}			0–1
Kashiwa Reysol				0–1			0–2	2–1			2–1^{OT}	1–0	5–1			3–2
Júbilo Iwata						2–0	1–0		3–0	2–1^{OT}		2–1^{OT}		4–1	2–1^{OT}	
Cerezo Osaka	0–0	0–2	3–2				1–2^{OT}	2–1				3–0			1–2	
Gamba Osaka	3–1	3–2	3–2^{OT}		2–1			0–1^{OT}	2–3^{OT}	5–0				3–4^{OT}		
FC Tokyo	2–0					0–2			0–1	2–1^{OT}		1–2		0–3	2–1	
Shimizu S-Pulse				1–0^{OT}			1–2^{OT}				5–1	1–0	1–0		5–2	1–0^{OT}
Nagoya Grampus Eight	2–1^{OT}	1–1	1–4		3–1			2–1^{OT}			3–2^{OT}		0–2			2–0
Tokyo Verdy 1969	2–1^{OT}	2–3	1–0		2–1			1–2	0–3				1–0^{OT}	1–2		
Sanfrecce Hiroshima				1–4	3–2^{OT}	2–3	3–0			3–2^{OT}		2–3			1–0	1–3
Avispa Fukuoka	0–2	1–0^{OT}				2–0			0–4	1–0				2–3^{OT}	0–2	
Vissel Kobe				2–2	3–1	0–1^{OT}	2–0				1–0	2–1			0–0	1–2^{OT}
JEF United Ichihara	2–0	2–0	2–3^{OT}		4–2			2–0	1–2^{OT}		1–3		4–1			
Consadole Sapporo	2–1	1–1	2–1			1–0			2–2	2–0				2–3^{OT}		
Urawa Red Diamonds				0–2	2–2	1–2	1–3			4–2		2–0		3–1	2–0	

Legend: Blue = home team win; Yellow = draw; Red = away team win.

=== Second stage ===
Pos	Team	Pld	W	OTW	D	OTL	L	GF	GA	GD	Pts	Qualification
1	Kashima Antlers (Note: Champion from 2000 J.League Division 1 and Cup-Winner 2000 Emperor's Cup)	15	10	3	0	0	2	36	19	+17	36	Qualification to the Suntory Championship
2	Júbilo Iwata	15	9	4	0	0	2	31	14	+17	35	
3	Sanfrecce Hiroshima	15	8	0	0	0	7	36	27	+9	24	
4	Shimizu S-Pulse	15	5	4	0	1	5	34	27	+7	23	
5	JEF United Ichihara	15	7	0	2	0	6	25	28	−3	23	
6	Nagoya Grampus Eight	15	7	0	1	1	6	27	25	+2	22	
7	Kashiwa Reysol	15	6	0	3	0	6	29	23	+6	21	
8	FC Tokyo	15	5	0	5	1	4	29	28	+1	20	
9	Tokyo Verdy 1969	15	6	0	2	2	5	22	26	−4	20	
10	Yokohama F. Marinos	15	4	2	3	3	3	19	20	−1	19	
11	Gamba Osaka	15	5	0	2	1	7	21	26	−5	17	
12	Urawa Red Diamonds (Note: Promoted from 2000 J.League Division 2)	15	4	0	3	3	5	20	24	−4	15	
13	Vissel Kobe	15	3	0	5	1	6	25	32	−7	14	
14	Consadole Sapporo	15	3	1	2	2	7	23	29	−6	13	
15	Avispa Fukuoka	15	3	1	2	3	6	22	31	−9	13	
16	Cerezo Osaka	15	2	3	0	0	10	19	39	−20	12	

Notes:

Results

Home \ Away	ANT	FMA	REY	JÚB	CER	GAM	TOK	SSP	GRA	VER	SFR	AVI	VIS	JEF	CON	RED
Kashima Antlers																
Yokohama F. Marinos																
Kashiwa Reysol																
Júbilo Iwata																
Cerezo Osaka																
Gamba Osaka																
FC Tokyo																
Shimizu S-Pulse																
Nagoya Grampus Eight																
Tokyo Verdy 1969																
Sanfrecce Hiroshima																
Avispa Fukuoka																
Vissel Kobe																
JEF United Ichihara																
Consadole Sapporo																
Urawa Red Diamonds																

Legend: Blue = home team win; Yellow = draw; Red = away team win.

=== Suntory Championship ===
2 December 2001
1st Leg

Júbilo Iwata	2–2	Kashima Antlers
Hattori 11'; Nakayama 54'	Report	Akita 80'; Hirase 83'

Shizuoka Stadium, Fukuroi
Attendance: 32,368
Referee: Masayoshi Okada

9 December 2001
2nd Leg

Kashima Antlers	1–0 (a.e.t.)	Júbilo Iwata
Ogasawara 100'	Report

Kashima Soccer Stadium, Kashima
Attendance: 40,115
Referee: Leslie Mottram

Kashima Antlers won 3–2 on aggregate.

== Overall table ==
Pos	Team	Pld	W	OTW	D	OTL	L	GF	GA	GD	Pts	Qualification or relegation
1	Kashima Antlers (Note: Champion from 2000 J.League Division 1 and Cup-Winner 2000 Emperor's Cup)	30	15	4	1	3	7	57	42	+15	54	Champion and qualified to the AFC Champions League 2002–03 Group stage
2	Júbilo Iwata	30	18	8	1	1	2	63	26	+37	71	
3	JEF United Ichihara	30	14	3	2	2	9	60	54	+6	50	
4	Shimizu S-Pulse	30	11	8	0	3	8	62	45	+17	49	Cup-Winner 2001 Emperor's Cup and qualified to the AFC Champions League 2002–03 Qualification Round 2
5	Nagoya Grampus Eight	30	12	5	3	1	9	56	45	+11	49	
6	Kashiwa Reysol	30	12	2	3	2	11	58	46	+12	43	
7	Gamba Osaka	30	12	2	2	4	10	50	48	+2	42	
8	FC Tokyo	30	10	3	5	1	11	47	47	0	41	
9	Sanfrecce Hiroshima	30	11	2	0	2	15	61	60	+1	37	
10	Urawa Red Diamonds (Note: Promoted from 2000 J.League Division 2)	30	10	1	4	4	11	44	46	−2	36	
11	Consadole Sapporo	30	9	1	5	4	11	43	50	−7	34	
12	Vissel Kobe	30	8	1	7	4	10	41	52	−11	33	
13	Yokohama F. Marinos	30	7	2	5	6	10	32	44	−12	30	
14	Tokyo Verdy 1969	30	8	2	2	5	13	38	57	−19	30	
15	Avispa Fukuoka	30	7	2	2	5	14	35	56	−21	27	Relegated to the 2002 J.League Division 2
16	Cerezo Osaka	30	5	3	2	2	18	41	70	−29	23	Relegated to the 2002 J.League Division 2

== Awards ==
=== Individual ===
Award	Recipient	Club
Player of the Year	(Japan) Toshiya Fujita	Júbilo Iwata
Young Player of the Year	(Japan) Koji Yamase	Consadole Sapporo
Manager of the Year	(Japan) Masakazu Suzuki	Júbilo Iwata
Top Scorer	(Brazil) Will	Consadole Sapporo

=== Best Eleven ===
Position	Footballer	Club	Nationality
GK	Arno van Zwam (1)	Júbilo Iwata	Netherlands
DF	Yutaka Akita (4)	Kashima Antlers	Japan
DF	Akira Narahashi (1)	Kashima Antlers	Japan
DF	Go Oiwa (1)	Júbilo Iwata	Japan
MF	Toshiya Fujita (2)	Júbilo Iwata	Japan
MF	Takashi Fukunishi (2)	Júbilo Iwata	Japan
MF	Toshihiro Hattori (1)	Júbilo Iwata	Japan
MF	Kōji Nakata (1)	Kashima Antlers	Japan
MF	Mitsuo Ogasawara (1)	Kashima Antlers	Japan
FW	Will (1)	Consadole Sapporo	Brazil
FW	Atsushi Yanagisawa (2)	Kashima Antlers	Japan

* The number in brackets denotes the number of times that the footballer has appeared in the Best 11.
