= 2000 Emperor's Cup =

Tournament details
- Country: Japan

Final positions
- Champions: Kashima Antlers
- Runners-up: Shimizu S-Pulse
- Semifinalists: Gamba Osaka; Vissel Kobe

Statistics of Emperor's Cup in the 2000 season.

== Overview ==
It was contested by 80 teams, and Kashima Antlers won the championship.

== Results ==
=== First round ===
- Nirasaki Astros 0–4 Hosei University
- Fukuoka University 4–1 Shimizu Commercial High School
- Gunma Fortuna 0–2 Consadole Sapporo
- Kusatsu Higashi High School 3–1 Yamagata Chuo High School
- Teihens FC 1–5 Albirex Niigata
- Ritsumeikan University 2–4 Kunimi High School
- Gifu Kogyo High School 1–7 Sagan Tosu
- Kanagawa Teachers 1–0 YKK AP SC
- Ehime FC 1–3 Yokohama FC
- Aichi Gakuin University 1–0 Fukui KSC
- Iwami FC 0–4 Shonan Bellmare
- Kochi University 1–1 (PK 4–5) Kibi International University
- Hatsushiba Hashimoto High School 0–5 Oita Trinita
- Sanfrecce Hiroshima U-18 0–1 FC Ueda Gentian
- Tenri University 0–6 Honda FC
- Nippon Steel Corporation Oita FC 4–2 Nippon Steel Kamaishi FC
- FC Primeiro 1–6 Denso SC
- Juntendo University 3–2 TDK
- SC Tottori 0–3 Omiya Ardija
- Tokuyama University 1–0 Apple Sports College
- Kwansei Gakuin University 2–1 Vegalta Sendai
- Tochigi SC 3–0 Hachinohe University
- Matsushita Electric Iga 0–4 Ventforet Kofu
- Sony Sendai 2–3 Doto University
- Saga Kita High School 0–12 Montedio Yamagata
- NIFS Kanoya 1–4 Jatco SC
- Kaiho Bank 0–3 Mito HollyHock
- Yokogawa Electric 1–1 (PK 4–5) Hannan University
- Saitama SC 0–2 Urawa Red Diamonds
- NTT Kumamoto 0–2 Honda Lock
- University of Tsukuba 4–1 Tokai University
- Sun Life FC 0–5 Otsuka Pharmaceuticals

=== Second round ===
- Hosei University 2–3 Fukuoka University
- Consadole Sapporo 6–0 Kusatsu Higashi High School
- Albirex Niigata 2–0 Kunimi High School
- Sagan Tosu 6–0 Kanagawa Teachers
- Yokohama FC 1–2 Aichi Gakuin University
- Shonan Bellmare 3–0 Kibi International University
- Oita Trinita 7–0 FC Ueda Gentian
- Honda FC 2–0 Nippon Steel Corporation Oita FC
- Denso SC 2–1 Juntendo University
- Omiya Ardija 4–1 Tokuyama University
- Kwansei Gakuin University 0–1 Tochigi SC
- Ventforet Kofu 2–1 Doto University
- Montedio Yamagata 1–2 Jatco SC
- Mito HollyHock 2–0 Hannan University
- Urawa Red Diamonds 9–0 Honda Lock
- University of Tsukuba 1–1 (PK 2–4) Otsuka Pharmaceuticals

=== Third round ===
- Yokohama F. Marinos 2–0 Fukuoka University
- Kyoto Purple Sanga 0–1 Consadole Sapporo
- Verdy Kawasaki 2–1 Albirex Niigata
- Kashima Antlers 2–1 Sagan Tosu
- Júbilo Iwata 5–0 Aichi Gakuin University
- Nagoya Grampus Eight 3–2 Shonan Bellmare
- Gamba Osaka 4–1 Oita Trinita
- Kashiwa Reysol 2–1 Honda FC
- Shimizu S-Pulse 3–0 Denso SC
- Avispa Fukuoka 4–2 Omiya Ardija
- JEF United Ichihara 1–0 Tochigi SC
- FC Tokyo 0–1 Ventforet Kofu
- Vissel Kobe 2–1 Jatco SC
- Sanfrecce Hiroshima 7–0 Mito HollyHock
- Kawasaki Frontale 0–2 Urawa Red Diamonds
- Cerezo Osaka 2–1 Otsuka Pharmaceuticals

=== Fourth round ===
- Yokohama F. Marinos 2–1 Consadole Sapporo
- Verdy Kawasaki 0–2 Kashima Antlers
- Júbilo Iwata 2–0 Nagoya Grampus Eight
- Gamba Osaka 1–1 (PK 10–9) Kashiwa Reysol
- Shimizu S-Pulse 1–0 Avispa Fukuoka
- JEF United Ichihara 3–1 Ventforet Kofu
- Vissel Kobe 1–0 Sanfrecce Hiroshima
- Urawa Red Diamonds 1–4 Cerezo Osaka

=== Quarter finals ===
- Yokohama F. Marinos 1–1 (PK 1–4) Kashima Antlers
- Júbilo Iwata 0–1 Gamba Osaka
- Shimizu S-Pulse 3–1 JEF United Ichihara
- Vissel Kobe 2–2 (PK 4–3) Cerezo Osaka

=== Semi finals ===
- Kashima Antlers 3–2 Gamba Osaka
- Shimizu S-Pulse 1–0 Vissel Kobe

=== Final ===
- Kashima Antlers 3–2 Shimizu S-Pulse

Kashima Antlers won the championship.
