= Hideaki Ozawa =

Japanese footballer

Hideaki Ozawa 小澤 英明
Personal information
- Date of birth: 17 March 1974 (age 52)
- Place of birth: Namegata, Ibaraki, Japan
- Height: 1.88 m (6 ft 2 in)
- Position: Goalkeeper

Youth career
- 1989–1991: Mito Junior College High School

Senior career*
Years	Team	Apps	(Gls)
1992–1997	Kashima Antlers	3	(0)
1998–2000	Yokohama F. Marinos	2	(0)
2000	→ Cerezo Osaka (loan)	0	(0)
2001–2003	FC Tokyo	1	(0)
2004–2009	Kashima Antlers	19	(0)
2010	Sportivo Luqueño	4	(0)
2011–2012	Albirex Niigata	20	(0)
Total		49	(0)
Medal record
Kashima Antlers
Winner	J1 League	1996
Winner	J1 League	2007
Winner	J1 League	2008
Winner	J1 League	2009
Runner-up	J1 League	1993
Runner-up	J1 League	1997
Winner	J.League Cup	1997
Runner-up	J.League Cup	2006
Winner	Emperor's Cup	1997
Winner	Emperor's Cup	2007
Runner-up	Emperor's Cup	1993
Yokohama F. Marinos
Runner-up	J1 League	2000
- * Club domestic league appearances and goals

Hideaki Ozawa (小澤 英明, Ozawa Hideaki; born 17 March 1974) is a Japanese former professional footballer who played as a goalkeeper.

== Career ==
Ozawa was born in Namegata on 17 March 1974.

=== Kashima Antlers ===
After graduating from high school, he joined Kashima Antlers in 1992. He could hardly play in the match behind Masaaki Furukawa and Yohei Sato. In July 1997, he left the club for spinal disc herniation.

=== Yokohama Marinos ===
In October 1998, he joined Yokohama Marinos (later Yokohama F. Marinos). However he could hardly play in the match behind Yoshikatsu Kawaguchi.

==== Cerezo Osaka (loan) ====
In 2000, he also played for Cerezo Osaka on loan from March to August.

=== Tokyo ===
In 2001, he moved to FC Tokyo. However he could hardly play in the match behind Yoichi Doi.

=== Kashima Antlers ===
In 2004, he returned to Antlers for the first time in 7 years. Although he could hardly play in the match behind Hitoshi Sogahata, he played 12 matches in 2006 because Sogahata got hurt.

=== Sportivo Luqueño ===
In January 2010, Sportivo Luqueño's president confirmed Ozawa's signing for the 2010 season, and was confirmed that the club's contact made with foreigners was done through Jose Luis Chilavert. When incorporating into the team, Ozawa joined goalkeepers Mario Villasanti and Arístides Florentín. He also joined Cameroon footballer Georges Nouga, Brazilians Eliel Cruz and Emerson Reba, Argentines Federico Cataruozzolo, Héctor Olmedo, Jonathan Germano, Alfredo Cano and Ruben Cecco, Chilean Claudio Chavarria and Colombian Carlos Valencia in the team. On 11 November 2010, Ozawa debuted for Sportivo Luqueño in a 1–1 away draw against Olimpia Asunción, goalkeeping for 90 minutes. On 21 November 2010, Ozawa goalkeeped for a full game in a 3–1 home victory against Tacuary. On 28 November 2010, Ozawa goalkeeped the entire game in a 0–0 away draw against Sport Colombia On 5 December 2010, Ozawa appeared in his last game for Sportivo Luqueño in a 1–1 home draw against Sol de América. The games disputed were for the 2010 Torneo Clausura.

=== Albirex Niigata ===
In 2011, he returned to Japan and signed with Albirex Niigata in April. From June, he played as regular goalkeeper until end of the season instead Masaaki Higashiguchi who got hurt. He retired end of 2012 season.

== Career statistics ==
Appearances and goals by club, season and competition
Club	Season	League			National cup (Note: Includes Emperor's Cup.)		League cup (Note: Includes J.League Cup.)		Total	
Club	Season	Division	Apps	Goals	Apps	Goals	Apps	Goals	Apps	Goals
Kashima Antlers	1992	J1 League	–		0	0	0	0	0	0
Kashima Antlers	1993	J1 League	0	0	0	0	0	0	0	0
Kashima Antlers	1994	J1 League	3	0	1	0	0	0	4	0
Kashima Antlers	1995	J1 League	0	0	0	0	–		0	0
Kashima Antlers	1996	J1 League	0	0	0	0	0	0	0	0
Kashima Antlers	1997	J1 League	0	0	0	0	0	0	0	0
Yokohama F. Marinos (Note: "Yokohama Marinos" until 1999)	1998	J1 League	0	0	0	0	0	0	0	0
Yokohama F. Marinos	1999	J1 League	2	0	1	0	0	0	3	0
Yokohama F. Marinos	2000	J1 League	0	0	0	0	0	0	0	0
Cerezo Osaka	2000	J1 League	0	0	0	0	3	0	3	0
FC Tokyo	2001	J1 League	1	0	0	0	1	0	2	0
FC Tokyo	2002	J1 League	0	0	0	0	0	0	0	0
FC Tokyo	2003	J1 League	0	0	0	0	2	0	2	0
Kashima Antlers	2004	J1 League	4	0	0	0	1	0	5	0
Kashima Antlers	2005	J1 League	0	0	0	0	1	0	1	0
Kashima Antlers	2006	J1 League	12	0	0	0	8	0	20	0
Kashima Antlers	2007	J1 League	3	0	0	0	0	0	3	0
Kashima Antlers	2008	J1 League	0	0	0	0	0	0	0	0
Kashima Antlers	2009	J1 League	0	0	0	0	0	0	0	0
Sportivo Luqueño	2010	Paraguayan Primera División	4	0					4	0
Albirex Niigata	2011	J1 League	17	0	2	0	1	0	20	0
Albirex Niigata	2012	J1 League	3	0	2	0	1	0	6	0
Career total			49	0	6	0	18	0	73	0
