= 1997 Kashima Antlers season =

Kashima Antlers
1997 season
- Manager: João Carlos
- Stadium: Kashima Soccer Stadium
- J.League: Runners-up
- Emperor's Cup: Champions
- J.League Cup: Champions
- Super Cup: Champions
- Asian Club Championship: Continued
- Top goalscorer: Mazinho (22)
| Home colours | Away colours |

1997 Kashima Antlers season

== Review and events ==
Kashima Antlers won J.League First Stage.

== Competitions ==
| Competitions | Position |
|---|---|
| J.League | Runners-up / 17 clubs |
| Emperor's Cup | Champions |
| J.League Cup | Champions |
| Super Cup | Champions |
| Asian Club Championship | Continued |

== Domestic results ==
=== J.League ===
| 12 April 1997 1-1 | Kashima Antlers | 5-2 | Vissel Kobe | Kashima Soccer Stadium |
| JST (UTC+09) |

| 1-2 | bye |

| 19 April 1997 1-3 | Nagoya Grampus Eight | 0-2 | Kashima Antlers | Mizuho Athletic Stadium |
| JST (UTC+09) |

| 23 April 1997 1-4 | Kashima Antlers | 1-0 | Yokohama Flügels | Kashima Soccer Stadium |
| JST (UTC+09) |

| 26 April 1997 1-5 | Júbilo Iwata | 1-2 | Kashima Antlers | Júbilo Iwata Stadium |
| JST (UTC+09) |

| 3 May 1997 1-6 | Kashima Antlers | 0-4 | Kashiwa Reysol | Tokyo National Stadium |
| JST (UTC+09) |

| 7 May 1997 1-7 | Urawa Red Diamonds | 1-3 | Kashima Antlers | Urawa Komaba Stadium |
| JST (UTC+09) |

| 10 May 1997 1-8 | Kashima Antlers | 1-2 | Gamba Osaka | Kashima Soccer Stadium |
| JST (UTC+09) |

| 17 May 1997 1-9 | Verdy Kawasaki | 1-1 (GG) (a.e.t.) (2-3 p) | Kashima Antlers | Tokyo National Stadium |
| JST (UTC+09) |

| 24 May 1997 1-10 | Kashima Antlers | 4-0 | Kyoto Purple Sanga | Kashima Soccer Stadium |
| JST (UTC+09) |

| 28 May 1997 1-11 | JEF United Ichihara | 0-2 | Kashima Antlers | Tokyo National Stadium |
| JST (UTC+09) |

| 31 May 1997 1-12 | Kashima Antlers | 2-1 | Bellmare Hiratsuka | Kashima Soccer Stadium |
| JST (UTC+09) |

| 5 July 1997 1-13 | Yokohama Marinos | 0-3 | Kashima Antlers | Yokohama Mitsuzawa Stadium |
| JST (UTC+09) |

| 9 July 1997 1-14 | Kashima Antlers | 0-1 | Shimizu S-Pulse | Kashima Soccer Stadium |
| JST (UTC+09) |

| 12 July 1997 1-15 | Sanfrecce Hiroshima | 2-3 | Kashima Antlers | Hiroshima Big Arch |
| JST (UTC+09) |

| 16 July 1997 1-16 | Kashima Antlers | 2-0 | Avispa Fukuoka | Kashima Soccer Stadium |
| JST (UTC+09) |

| 19 July 1997 1-17 | Cerezo Osaka | 0-1 | Kashima Antlers | Osaka Nagai Stadium |
| JST (UTC+09) |

| 30 July 1997 2-1 | Avispa Fukuoka | 1-3 | Kashima Antlers | Hakatanomori Football Stadium |
| JST (UTC+09) |

| 2 August 1997 2-2 | Vissel Kobe | 0-5 | Kashima Antlers | Kobe Universiade Memorial Stadium |
| JST (UTC+09) |

| 2-3 | bye |

| 9 August 1997 2-4 | Kashima Antlers | 7-0 | Nagoya Grampus Eight | Kashima Soccer Stadium |
| JST (UTC+09) |

| 16 August 1997 2-5 | Yokohama Flügels | 5-3 | Kashima Antlers | Yokohama Mitsuzawa Stadium |
| JST (UTC+09) |

| 20 August 1997 2-6 | Kashima Antlers | 2-0 | Júbilo Iwata | Kashima Soccer Stadium |
| JST (UTC+09) |

| 23 August 1997 2-7 | Kashiwa Reysol | 3-5 | Kashima Antlers | Hitachi Kashiwa Soccer Stadium |
| JST (UTC+09) |

| 30 August 1997 2-8 | Kashima Antlers | 1-0 | Urawa Red Diamonds | Kashima Soccer Stadium |
| JST (UTC+09) |

| 3 September 1997 2-9 | Gamba Osaka | 2-1 (GG) (a.e.t.) | Kashima Antlers | Osaka Expo '70 Stadium |
| JST (UTC+09) |

| 6 September 1997 2-10 | Kashima Antlers | 5-0 | Verdy Kawasaki | Kashima Soccer Stadium |
| JST (UTC+09) |

| 10 September 1997 2-11 | Kashima Antlers | 2-1 (GG) (a.e.t.) | Sanfrecce Hiroshima | Kashima Soccer Stadium |
| JST (UTC+09) |

| 13 September 1997 2-12 | Kyoto Purple Sanga | 3-2 | Kashima Antlers | Nishikyogoku Athletic Stadium |
| JST (UTC+09) |

| 20 September 1997 2-13 | Bellmare Hiratsuka | 2-5 | Kashima Antlers | Hiratsuka Athletics Stadium |
| JST (UTC+09) |

| 24 September 1997 2-14 | Kashima Antlers | 2-1 (GG) (a.e.t.) | JEF United Ichihara | Kashima Soccer Stadium |
| JST (UTC+09) |

| 27 September 1997 2-15 | Kashima Antlers | 2-1 | Yokohama Marinos | Kashima Soccer Stadium |
| JST (UTC+09) |

| 1 October 1997 2-16 | Shimizu S-Pulse | 2-0 | Kashima Antlers | Nihondaira Sports Stadium |
| JST (UTC+09) |

| 4 October 1997 2-17 | Kashima Antlers | 1-2 | Cerezo Osaka | Kashima Soccer Stadium |
| JST (UTC+09) |

=== Emperor's Cup ===
| 1st Round | bye |

| 2nd Round | bye |

| 17 December 1997 3rd Round | Kashima Antlers | 4-1 | Juntendo University | Kashima Soccer Stadium |
| JST (UTC+09) |

| 20 December 1997 4th Round | Kashima Antlers | 6-0 | Avispa Fukuoka | Kagoshima Kamoike Stadium |
| JST (UTC+09) |

| 23 December 1997 Quarterfinals | Kashima Antlers | 3-0 | Gamba Osaka | Urawa Komaba Stadium |
| JST (UTC+09) |

| 28 December 1997 Semifinals | Kashima Antlers | 3-1 | Tokyo Gas | Tokyo National Stadium |
| JST (UTC+09) |

| 1 January 1998 Final | Kashima Antlers | 3-0 | Yokohama Flügels | Tokyo National Stadium |
| JST (UTC+09) |

=== J.League Cup ===
| 8 March 1997 GL-C-1 | Kashima Antlers | 2-4 | Cerezo Osaka | Kashima Soccer Stadium |
| JST (UTC+09) |

| 15 March 1997 GL-C-2 | Urawa Red Diamonds | 1-1 | Kashima Antlers | Urawa Komaba Stadium |
| JST (UTC+09) |

| 19 March 1997 GL-C-3 | Kashima Antlers | 5-0 | Sagan Tosu | Kashima Soccer Stadium |
| JST (UTC+09) |

| 22 March 1997 GL-C-4 | Kashima Antlers | 0-0 | Urawa Red Diamonds | Kashima Soccer Stadium |
| JST (UTC+09) |

| 26 March 1997 GL-C-5 | Sagan Tosu | 1-4 | Kashima Antlers | Tosu Stadium |
| JST (UTC+09) |

| 29 March 1997 GL-C-6 | Cerezo Osaka | 3-4 | Kashima Antlers | Osaka Nagai Stadium |
| JST (UTC+09) |

| 15 October 1997 Quarterfinals-1 | Consadole Sapporo | 1-2 | Kashima Antlers | Sapporo Atsubetsu Park Stadium |
| JST (UTC+09) |

| 18 October 1997 Quarterfinals-2 | Kashima Antlers | 7-0 (9-1 agg.) | Consadole Sapporo | Kashima Soccer Stadium |
| JST (UTC+09) |

| 1 November 1997 Semifinals-1 | Kashima Antlers | 1-0 | Nagoya Grampus Eight | Kashima Soccer Stadium |
| JST (UTC+09) |

| 8 November 1997 Semifinals-2 | Nagoya Grampus Eight | 0-0 (0-1 agg.) | Kashima Antlers | Mizuho Athletic Stadium |
| JST (UTC+09) |

| 22 November 1997 Final-1 | Júbilo Iwata | 1-2 | Kashima Antlers | Júbilo Iwata Stadium |
| JST (UTC+09) | | J. League |

| 29 November 1997 Final-2 | Kashima Antlers | 5-1 (7-2 agg.) | Júbilo Iwata | Kashima Soccer Stadium |
| JST (UTC+09) | | J. League |

=== Super Cup ===
| 5 April 1997 | Kashima Antlers | 3-2 | Verdy Kawasaki | Tokyo National Stadium |
| | Mazinho ?'; Yanagisawa ?', ?' | | Hashiratani ?'; Magrão ?' | Attendance: 28,920 |

== International results ==
=== Asian Club Championship ===
| 27 August 1997 1st Round-1 | (Japan) Kashima Antlers | 6-1 | (Singapore) Geylang United | Kashima, Japan |
| | Yanagisawa ?', ?'; Jorginho ?'; Kurosaki ?'; Mazinho ?'; Bismarck ?' | | ? ?' | Stadium: Kashima Soccer Stadium; Attendance: 12,755 |

| 3 September 1997 1st Round-2 | (Singapore) Geylang United | 1-2 (2-8 agg.) | (Japan) Kashima Antlers | Singapore |
| | ? ?' | | Hasegawa ?'; Abe ?' | Stadium: National Stadium |

| 12 November 1997 2nd Round-1 | (South Korea) Ulsan Hyundai | 1-5 | (Japan) Kashima Antlers | Ulsan, Korea Rep. |
| | ? ?' | | Kumagai ?', ?'; Mazinho ?', ?'; Hasegawa ?' | Stadium: Yokohama Mitsuzawa Stadium; Attendance: 5,000 |

| 19 November 1997 2nd Round-2 | (Japan) Kashima Antlers | 1-1 (6-2 agg.) | (South Korea) Ulsan Hyundai | Kashima, Japan |
| | ? ?' | | Mazinho ?' | Stadium: Kashima Soccer Stadium; Attendance: 10,572 |

== Player statistics ==
| No. | Pos. | Nat. | Player | D.o.B. (Age) | Height / Weight | J.League | | J.League Championship | | Emperor's Cup | | J.League Cup | | Super Cup | | Dom. Total | | Asian Club Championship | |
| No. | Pos. | Nat. | Player | D.o.B. (Age) | Height / Weight | Apps | Goals | Apps | Goals | Apps | Goals | Apps | Goals | Apps | Goals | Apps | Goals | Apps | Goals |
|---|---|---|---|---|---|---|---|---|---|---|---|---|---|---|---|---|---|---|---|
| 1 | GK | (Japan) | Masaaki Furukawa | August 28, 1968 (aged 28) | 180 cm / 74 kg | 5 | 0 | 0 | 0 | 0 | 0 | 6 | 0 | 1 | 0 | 12 | 0 | | 0 |
| 2 | MF | (Brazil) | Jorginho | August 17, 1964 (aged 32) | 175 cm / 69 kg | 31 | 5 | 2 | 0 | 5 | 4 | 12 | 7 | 1 | 0 | 51 | 16 | | 1 |
| 3 | DF | (Japan) | Yutaka Akita | August 6, 1970 (aged 26) | 180 cm / 80 kg | 21 | 3 | 2 | 0 | 5 | 1 | 2 | 2 | 1 | 0 | 31 | 6 | | 0 |
| 4 | DF | (Japan) | Ryosuke Okuno | November 13, 1968 (aged 28) | 174 cm / 71 kg | 32 | 0 | 2 | 0 | 4 | 0 | 12 | 0 | 1 | 0 | 51 | 0 | | 0 |
| 5 | DF | (Japan) | Naruyuki Naito | November 9, 1967 (aged 29) | 178 cm / 72 kg | 20 | 0 | 1 | 0 | 1 | 0 | 11 | 0 | 1 | 0 | 34 | 0 | | 0 |
| 6 | MF | (Japan) | Yasuto Honda | June 25, 1969 (aged 27) | 166 cm / 64 kg | 21 | 0 | 2 | 0 | 5 | 0 | 2 | 0 | 1 | 0 | 31 | 0 | | 0 |
| 7 | DF | (Japan) | Naoki Soma | July 19, 1971 (aged 25) | 175 cm / 72 kg | 21 | 0 | 2 | 0 | 5 | 0 | 2 | 1 | 1 | 0 | 31 | 1 | | 0 |
| 8 | FW | (Brazil) | Mazinho | December 26, 1965 (aged 31) | 180 cm / 72 kg | 31 | 22 | 2 | 1 | 5 | 7 | 12 | 6 | 1 | 1 | 51 | 37 | | 4 |
| 9 | FW | (Japan) | Hisashi Kurosaki | May 8, 1968 (aged 28) | 185 cm / 79 kg | 26 | 10 | 0 | 0 | 2 | 0 | 5 | 3 | 0 | 0 | 33 | 13 | | 1 |
| 10 | MF | (Brazil) | Bismarck | September 17, 1969 (aged 27) | 177 cm / 75 kg | 32 | 11 | 2 | 1 | 5 | 2 | 11 | 3 | 1 | 0 | 51 | 17 | | 1 |
| 11 | FW | (Japan) | Yoshiyuki Hasegawa | February 11, 1969 (aged 28) | 179 cm / 68 kg | 27 | 7 | 2 | 0 | 2 | 1 | 11 | 4 | 1 | 0 | 43 | 12 | | 2 |
| 12 | MF | (Brazil) | Rodrigo | August 9, 1975 (aged 21) | 180 cm / 74 kg | 2 | 0 | 0 | 0 | 0 | 0 | 0 | 0 | 0 | 0 | 2 | 0 | | 0 |
| 13 | FW | (Japan) | Atsushi Yanagisawa | May 27, 1977 (aged 19) | 177 cm / 72 kg | 25 | 8 | 2 | 0 | 5 | 2 | 9 | 2 | 1 | 2 | 42 | 14 | | 2 |
| 14 | MF | (Japan) | Tadatoshi Masuda | December 25, 1973 (aged 23) | 171 cm / 66 kg | 23 | 5 | 2 | 0 | 5 | 2 | 10 | 3 | 0 | 0 | 40 | 10 | | 0 |
| 15 | DF | (Japan) | Ichiei Muroi | June 22, 1974 (aged 22) | 183 cm / 70 kg | 13 | 1 | 0 | 0 | 1 | 0 | 9 | 0 | 0 | 0 | 23 | 1 | | 0 |
| 16 | MF | (Japan) | Taijiro Kurita | March 3, 1975 (aged 22) | 179 cm / 70 kg | 10 | 0 | 0 | 0 | 0 | 0 | 6 | 0 | 0 | 0 | 16 | 0 | | 0 |
| 17 | MF | (Japan) | Toru Oniki | April 20, 1974 (aged 22) | 168 cm / 63 kg | 5 | 0 | 0 | 0 | 0 | 0 | 3 | 0 | 1 | 0 | 9 | 0 | | 0 |
| 18 | MF | (Japan) | Koji Kumagai | October 23, 1975 (aged 21) | 177 cm / 63 kg | 5 | 0 | 0 | 0 | 1 | 0 | 5 | 0 | 0 | 0 | 11 | 0 | | 2 |
| 19 | FW | (Japan) | Yasuo Manaka | January 31, 1971 (aged 26) | 171 cm / 74 kg | 12 | 4 | 1 | 0 | 0 | 0 | 4 | 0 | 0 | 0 | 17 | 4 | | 0 |
| 20 | MF | (Japan) | Masatada Ishii | February 1, 1967 (aged 30) | 176 cm / 71 kg | 11 | 0 | 0 | 0 | 0 | 0 | 5 | 0 | 0 | 0 | 16 | 0 | | 0 |
| 21 | GK | (Japan) | Yohei Sato | November 22, 1972 (aged 24) | 185 cm / 79 kg | 28 | 0 | 2 | 0 | 5 | 0 | 6 | 0 | 0 | 0 | 41 | 0 | | 0 |
| 22 | DF | (Japan) | Masaki Ogawa | April 3, 1975 (aged 21) | 177 cm / 73 kg | 0 | 0 | 0 | 0 | 0 | 0 | 1 | 0 | 0 | 0 | 1 | 0 | | 0 |
| 23 | MF | (Japan) | Toshiyuki Abe | August 1, 1974 (aged 22) | 180 cm / 70 kg | 0 | 0 | 0 | 0 | 0 | 0 | 1 | 0 | 0 | 0 | 1 | 0 | | 1 |
| 24 | DF | (Japan) | Masafumi Mizuki | August 1, 1974 (aged 22) | 177 cm / 74 kg | 0 | 0 | 0 | 0 | | 0 | 0 | 0 | 0 | 0 | | 0 | | 0 |
| 25 | DF | (Japan) | Tomohiko Ikeuchi | November 1, 1977 (aged 19) | 179 cm / 68 kg | 0 | 0 | 0 | 0 | | 0 | 0 | 0 | 0 | 0 | | 0 | | 0 |
| 26 | FW | (Japan) | Takayuki Suzuki | June 5, 1976 (aged 20) | 182 cm / 75 kg | 0 | 0 | 0 | 0 | | 0 | 0 | 0 | 0 | 0 | | 0 | | 0 |
| 27 | FW | (Japan) | Tomoyuki Hirase | May 23, 1977 (aged 19) | 183 cm / 72 kg | 1 | 0 | 0 | 0 | 0 | 0 | 0 | 0 | 0 | 0 | 1 | 0 | | 0 |
| 28 | DF | (Japan) | Kensaku Omori | November 21, 1975 (aged 21) | 177 cm / 69 kg | 1 | 0 | 0 | 0 | 0 | 0 | 2 | 0 | 0 | 0 | 3 | 0 | | 0 |
| 29 | GK | (Japan) | Daijiro Takakuwa | August 10, 1973 (aged 23) | 190 cm / 80 kg | 0 | 0 | 0 | 0 | | 0 | 0 | 0 | 0 | 0 | | 0 | | 0 |
| 30 | GK | (Japan) | Hideaki Ozawa | March 17, 1974 (aged 22) | 188 cm / 82 kg | 0 | 0 | 0 | 0 | 0 | 0 | 0 | 0 | 0 | 0 | 0 | 0 | | 0 |
| 31 | GK | (Japan) | Tomoya Ichikawa | December 12, 1976 (aged 20) | 180 cm / 70 kg | 0 | 0 | 0 | 0 | | 0 | 0 | 0 | 0 | 0 | | 0 | | 0 |
| 32 | DF | (Japan) | Akira Narahashi | November 26, 1971 (aged 25) | 169 cm / 71 kg | 17 | 1 | 2 | 0 | 5 | 0 | 7 | 1 | 1 | 0 | 32 | 2 | | 0 |
| | MF | (Japan) | 岩瀬 祐一 † | no data | -cm / -kg | 0 | 0 | 0 | 0 | 0 | 0 | 0 | 0 | 0 | 0 | 0 | 0 | | 0 |
| | DF | (Japan) | Toshihiro Yahata † | May 29, 1980 (aged 16) | -cm / -kg | 0 | 0 | 0 | 0 | 0 | 0 | 0 | 0 | 0 | 0 | 0 | 0 | | 0 |
| | MF | (Japan) | 渋谷 直樹 † | no data | -cm / -kg | 0 | 0 | 0 | 0 | 0 | 0 | 0 | 0 | 0 | 0 | 0 | 0 | | 0 |
| | MF | (Japan) | Takuya Nozawa † | August 12, 1981 (aged 15) | -cm / -kg | 0 | 0 | 0 | 0 | 0 | 0 | 0 | 0 | 0 | 0 | 0 | 0 | | 0 |

- † player(s) joined the team after the opening of this season.

== Transfers ==
In:

| No. | Pos. | Nation | Player |
|---|---|---|---|
| 28 | DF | JPN | Kensaku Omori (from Yokohama Marinos) |
| 32 | DF | JPN | Akira Narahashi (from Bellmare Hiratsuka) |
| 10 | MF | BRA | Bismarck (from Verdy Kawasaki) |

Out:

| No. | Pos. | Nation | Player |
|---|---|---|---|
| — | DF | JPN | Eiji Gaya (to Yokohama Marinos) |
| — | FW | JPN | Satoshi Koga (to Brummel Sendai) |
| — | FW | JPN | Kenichi Hashimoto (to Yokohama Marinos) |
| — | FW | BRA | Carbone |

== Transfers during the season ==
=== In ===
- (Japan) Toshiyuki Abe (loan return from CFZ do Rio on August)
- (Japan) Takayuki Suzuki (loan return from CFZ do Rio on September)
- (Japan) 岩瀬 祐一 (Kashima Antlers youth)
- (Japan) Toshihiro Yahata (Kashima Antlers youth)
- (Japan) 渋谷 直樹 (Kashima Antlers youth)
- (Japan) Takuya Nozawa (Kashima Antlers youth)

=== Out ===
- (Japan) Hideaki Ozawa
- (Japan) Masaki Ogawa (to Kyoto Purple Sanga)
- (Japan) Toshiyuki Abe (loan to CFZ do Rio on March)
- (Japan) Takayuki Suzuki (loan to CFZ do Rio on March)
- (Japan) 岩瀬 祐一 (Kashima Antlers youth)
- (Japan) Toshihiro Yahata (Kashima Antlers youth)
- (Japan) 渋谷 直樹 (Kashima Antlers youth)
- (Japan) Takuya Nozawa (Kashima Antlers youth)

== Awards ==
- J.League Best XI: (Japan) Yutaka Akita, (Japan) Naoki Soma, (Brazil) Bismarck
- J.League Rookie of the Year: (Japan) Atsushi Yanagisawa

== Other pages ==
- (in Japanese) J. League official site
- (in Japanese) Kashima Antlers official site
