= Masaaki Furukawa =

Japanese footballer

Masaaki Furukawa 古川 昌明
Personal information
- Full name: Masaaki Furukawa
- Date of birth: 28 August 1968 (age 58)
- Place of birth: Chiba, Japan
- Height: 1.80 m (5 ft 11 in)
- Position: Goalkeeper

Youth career
- 1984–1986: Ichihara Midori High School

Senior career*
Years	Team	Apps	(Gls)
1989–1990	Honda	0	(0)
1990–1991	Honda Luminozo Sayama		
1992–2000	Kashima Antlers	125	(0)
1998	→ Avispa Fukuoka (loan)	1	(0)
Total		126	(0)
Medal record
Kashima Antlers
Winner	J1 League	1996
Winner	J1 League	1998
Winner	J1 League	2000
Runner-up	J1 League	1993
Runner-up	J1 League	1997
Winner	J.League Cup	1997
Winner	J.League Cup	2000
Runner-up	J.League Cup	1999
Winner	Emperor's Cup	1997
Winner	Emperor's Cup	2000
Runner-up	Emperor's Cup	1993
- * Club domestic league appearances and goals

Masaaki Furukawa (古川 昌明, Furukawa Masaaki; born 28 August 1968) is a former Japanese football player.

== Playing career ==
Furukawa was born in Chiba on 28 August 1968. After graduating from high school, he joined Honda in 1987. However he was not registered as a player until 1989. He could hardly play in the match and moved to Honda Luminozo Sayama in 1990. He left the club in June 1991 and moved to Brazil. After training in Brazil, he joined Kashima Antlers in 1992. He played as regular goalkeeper until 1994. From 1995, although he battles with Yohei Sato for the position, he could hardly play in the match behind Sato and Daijiro Takakuwa from 1997. He moved to Avispa Fukuoka in September 1998. Although he returned to Antlers in 1999, he could not play in the match. He retired end of 2000 season.

== Club statistics ==
Club performance			League		Cup		League Cup		Total	
Season	Club	League	Apps	Goals	Apps	Goals	Apps	Goals	Apps	Goals
Japan			League		Emperor's Cup		J.League Cup		Total	
1989/90	Honda	JSL Division 1	0	0			2	0	2	0
1990	Honda Luminozo Sayama	Prefectural Leagues								
1991	Honda Luminozo Sayama	Regional Leagues								
1992	Kashima Antlers	J1 League	-		3	0	5	0	8	0
1993	Kashima Antlers	J1 League	36	0	5	0	3	0	44	0
1994	Kashima Antlers	J1 League	34	0	0	0	1	0	35	0
1995	Kashima Antlers	J1 League	26	0	0	0	-		26	0
1996	Kashima Antlers	J1 League	15	0	3	0	4	0	22	0
1997	Kashima Antlers	J1 League	5	0	0	0	6	0	11	0
1998	Kashima Antlers	J1 League	9	0	0	0	0	0	9	0
1998	Avispa Fukuoka	J1 League	1	0	0	0	0	0	1	0
1999	Kashima Antlers	J1 League	0	0	0	0	0	0	0	0
2000	Kashima Antlers	J1 League	0	0	0	0	0	0	0	0
Total			126	0	11	0	21	0	158	0

== Manga ==
A 51-page manga story about Furukawa was published in Weekly Shōnen Sunday in 1994. It was called Furukawa Masaaki Monogatari – Kowareta Radio and it was illustrated by Yoshihiro Takahashi.
