= Ryosuke Okuno =

Japanese footballer and manager

Ryosuke Okuno 奥野 僚右
Personal information
- Full name: Ryosuke Okuno
- Date of birth: 13 November 1968 (age 58)
- Place of birth: Kyoto, Kyoto, Japan
- Height: 1.74 m (5 ft 9 in)
- Position: Defender

Youth career
- 1984–1986: Yamashiro High School
- 1989–1992: Waseda University

Senior career*
| Years | Team | Apps | (Gls) |
| 1993–1999 | Kashima Antlers | 185 | (1) |
| 2000 | Kawasaki Frontale | 25 | (0) |
| 2001 | Sanfrecce Hiroshima | 21 | (1) |
| 2002–2003 | Thespa Kusatsu | | |
| Total | | 231 | (2) |

Managerial career
- 2002–2003: Thespa Kusatsu
- 2012–2013: Montedio Yamagata
- 2020–2021: Thespakusatsu Gunma
Medal record
Kashima Antlers
| Winner | J1 League | 1996 |
| Winner | J1 League | 1998 |
| Runner-up | J1 League | 1993 |
| Runner-up | J1 League | 1997 |
| Winner | J.League Cup | 1997 |
| Runner-up | J.League Cup | 1999 |
| Winner | Emperor's Cup | 1997 |
| Runner-up | Emperor's Cup | 1993 |
Kawasaki Frontale
| Runner-up | J.League Cup | 2000 |
- * Club domestic league appearances and goals

Ryosuke Okuno (奥野 僚右, Okuno Ryōsuke; born 13 November 1968) is a former Japanese football player and manager.

== Playing career ==
Okuno was born in Kyoto on 13 November 1968. After graduating from Waseda University, he joined Kashima Antlers in 1993. He played many matches as center back with Yutaka Akita for a long time and made the beginning of the golden era of the club. The club won the champions 1996, 1998 J1 League, 1997 J.League Cup and 1997 Emperor's Cup. In 2000, he moved to newly was promoted to J1 League club, Kawasaki Frontale. He played as center back of three backs defense. Although the club finished at bottom place in the league, the club won the 2nd place in J.League Cup. In 2001, he moved to Sanfrecce Hiroshima. In 2002, he moved to Prefectural Leagues club Thespa Kusatsu and became a playing manager. The club was promoted to Regional Leagues in 2003 and Japan Football League in 2004. He retired end of 2003 season.

== Coaching career ==
In 2002, Okuno signed with Prefectural Leagues club Thespa Kusatsu and became a playing manager. The club was promoted to Regional Leagues in 2003 and Japan Football League in 2004. However he retired from playing career and left the club end of 2003 season. In 2004, he returned to his old club Kashima Antlers and became a coach. The club won the champions for 3 years in a row (2007–2009). In 2012, he moved to J2 League club Montedio Yamagata and became a manager. He managed the club until 2013.

== Career statistics ==
Appearances and goals by club, season and competition
| Club | Season | League | | | Emperor's Cup | | J.League Cup | | Total | |
| Club | Season | Division | Apps | Goals | Apps | Goals | Apps | Goals | Apps | Goals |
|---|---|---|---|---|---|---|---|---|---|---|
| Kashima Antlers | 1993 | J1 League | 11 | 0 | 5 | 1 | 6 | 0 | 22 | 1 |
| Kashima Antlers | 1994 | J1 League | 26 | 0 | 1 | 0 | 0 | 0 | 27 | 0 |
| Kashima Antlers | 1995 | J1 League | 40 | 1 | 4 | 0 | - | | 44 | 1 |
| Kashima Antlers | 1996 | J1 League | 29 | 0 | 3 | 0 | 3 | 0 | 35 | 0 |
| Kashima Antlers | 1997 | J1 League | 32 | 0 | 4 | 0 | 12 | 0 | 48 | 0 |
| Kashima Antlers | 1998 | J1 League | 29 | 0 | 0 | 0 | 5 | 0 | 34 | 0 |
| Kashima Antlers | 1999 | J1 League | 18 | 0 | 0 | 0 | 4 | 0 | 22 | 0 |
| Kawasaki Frontale | 2000 | J1 League | 25 | 0 | 1 | 0 | 7 | 0 | 33 | 0 |
| Sanfrecce Hiroshima | 2001 | J1 League | 21 | 1 | 0 | 0 | 4 | 0 | 25 | 1 |
| Thespa Kusatsu | 2002 | Prefectural Leagues | | | | | | | | |
| Thespa Kusatsu | 2003 | Regional Leagues | 21 | 0 | | | | | 21 | 0 |
| Career total | | | 252 | 2 | 18 | 0 | 41 | 0 | 311 | 2 |

== Managerial statistics ==
| Team | From | To | Record | | | | |
| Team | From | To | G | W | D | L | Win % |
|---|---|---|---|---|---|---|---|
| Montedio Yamagata | 2012 | 2013 | 84 | 32 | 24 | 28 | 38.10 |
| Total | | | 84 | 32 | 24 | 28 | 38.10 |
