= Tadatoshi Masuda =

Japanese footballer (born 1973)

Tadatoshi Masuda 増田 忠俊
Personal information
- Full name: Tadatoshi Masuda
- Date of birth: December 25, 1973 (age 52)
- Place of birth: Shizuoka, Japan
- Height: 1.74 m (5 ft 8 1/2 in)
- Position: Midfielder

Youth career
- 1989–1991: Shizuoka Gakuen High School

Senior career*
Years	Team	Apps	(Gls)
1992–2000	Kashima Antlers	148	(27)
2000–2001	FC Tokyo	23	(1)
2002	JEF United Ichihara	14	(2)
2003–2005	Kashiwa Reysol	47	(2)
2006	Oita Trinita	3	(0)
Total		235	(32)

International career
1998	Japan	1	(0)
Medal record
Kashima Antlers
Winner	J1 League	1996
Winner	J1 League	1998
Winner	J1 League	2000
Runner-up	J1 League	1993
Runner-up	J1 League	1997
Winner	J.League Cup	1997
Winner	J.League Cup	2000
Runner-up	J.League Cup	1999
Winner	Emperor's Cup	1997
Winner	Emperor's Cup	2000
Runner-up	Emperor's Cup	1993
- * Club domestic league appearances and goals

Tadatoshi Masuda (増田 忠俊, Masuda Tadatoshi; born December 25, 1973) is a former Japanese football player. He played once for Japan national team.

== Club career ==
Masuda was born in Shizuoka on December 25, 1973. After graduating from Shizuoka Gakuen High School, he joined Kashima Antlers in 1992. He debuted in 1994 and played many games as offensive midfielder. The club won the champions at 1996 J1 League and 1997 J.League Cup. However he got hurt in August 1998. Although he came back in September 1999, his opportunity to play decreased. He moved to FC Tokyo in June 2000. After that, he played for JEF United Ichihara (2002), Kashiwa Reysol (2003-2005) and Oita Trinita (2006). He retired end of 2006 season.

== National team career ==
On February 15, 1998, Masuda debuted for Japan national team against Australia.

== Club statistics ==
Club performance			League		Cup		League Cup		Total	
Season	Club	League	Apps	Goals	Apps	Goals	Apps	Goals	Apps	Goals
Japan			League		Emperor's Cup		J.League Cup		Total	
1992	Kashima Antlers	J1 League	-		0	0	0	0	0	0
1993	Kashima Antlers	J1 League	0	0	0	0	0	0	0	0
1994	Kashima Antlers	J1 League	26	6	0	0	1	0	27	6
1995	Kashima Antlers	J1 League	35	6	4	1	-		39	7
1996	Kashima Antlers	J1 League	29	4	3	1	13	1	45	6
1997	Kashima Antlers	J1 League	23	5	5	2	10	3	38	10
1998	Kashima Antlers	J1 League	16	4	0	0	4	3	20	7
1999	Kashima Antlers	J1 League	5	2	2	0	3	0	10	2
2000	Kashima Antlers	J1 League	14	0	0	0	0	0	14	0
2000	FC Tokyo	J1 League	13	1	1	0	2	0	16	1
2001	FC Tokyo	J1 League	10	0	1	0	2	0	13	0
2002	JEF United Ichihara	J1 League	14	2	4	1	6	2	24	5
2003	Kashiwa Reysol	J1 League	13	0	2	0	4	0	19	0
2004	Kashiwa Reysol	J1 League	19	2	0	0	3	0	22	2
2005	Kashiwa Reysol	J1 League	15	0	1	0	3	1	19	1
2006	Oita Trinita	J1 League	3	0	0	0	4	0	7	0
Total			235	32	23	5	55	10	313	47

== National team statistics ==
Japan national team
Year	Apps	Goals
1998	1	0
Total	1	0
