= Naoki Soma =

Japanese footballer and manager

Naoki Soma 相馬 直樹
Personal information
- Date of birth: 19 July 1971 (age 55)
- Place of birth: Shizuoka, Shizuoka, Japan
- Height: 1.75 m (5 ft 9 in)
- Positions: Midfielder; defender

Team information
- Current team: Tokyo Verdy (manager)

Youth career
- 1987–1989: Shimizu Higashi High School

College career
| Years | Team | Apps | (Gls) |
| 1990–1993 | Waseda University | | |

Senior career*
| Years | Team | Apps | (Gls) |
| 1994–2003 | Kashima Antlers | 250 | (10) |
| 2002 | →Tokyo Verdy (loan) | 27 | (0) |
| 2004–2005 | Kawasaki Frontale | 27 | (0) |
| Total | | 304 | (10) |

International career
| 1995–1999 | Japan | 58 | (4) |

Managerial career
- 2010: Machida Zelvia
- 2011–2012: Kawasaki Frontale
- 2014–2019: Machida Zelvia
- 2021: Kashima Antlers
- 2022–2023: Omiya Ardija
- 2025: Kagoshima United
- 2026-: Tokyo Verdy
Medal record
Kashima Antlers
| Winner | J1 League | 1996 |
| Winner | J1 League | 1998 |
| Winner | J1 League | 2000 |
| Winner | J1 League | 2001 |
| Runner-up | J1 League | 1997 |
| Winner | J.League Cup | 1997 |
| Winner | J.League Cup | 2000 |
| Runner-up | J.League Cup | 1999 |
| Runner-up | J.League Cup | 2003 |
| Winner | Emperor's Cup | 1997 |
| Winner | Emperor's Cup | 2000 |
- * Club domestic league appearances and goals

Naoki Soma (相馬 直樹, Sōma Naoki; born July 19, 1971) is a Japanese football manager and former player. He played for the Japan national team until 1999. He is currently the manager of Tokyo Verdy.

== Club career ==
Soma was born in Shizuoka on July 19, 1971. After graduating from Waseda University, he joined Kashima Antlers in 1994. He played as left-back and became one of the main player in a successful era of the club. In the 1990s, the club won several titles: the 1996 J.League, 1998 J.League, 1997 J.League Cup and 1997 Emperor's Cup. He was also selected for the Best Eleven for four years in a row (1995-1998). In 2000, the club won all three major titles in Japan: J1 League, J.League Cup and Emperor's Cup. However at Emperor's Cup in December 2000, he sustained an injury and he could not play for about a year. Although he came back in the latter half of 2001, his opportunity to play decreased behind Augusto. In 2002, he moved to Tokyo Verdy on loan. He returned to Kashima Antlers in 2003 and moved to Kawasaki Frontale in 2004. At Kawasaki Frontale, he played as defensive midfielder and sweeper. He retired at the end of the 2005 season.

== International career ==
On May 28, 1995, Soma debuted for the Japan national team against Ecuador. After his debut, he became a regular player as left-back and left midfielder. In 1996, he played in all matches included 1996 AFC Asian Cup. In the 1998 FIFA World Cup qualification in 1997, Japan achieved qualification for 1998 FIFA World Cup first time Japan's history. He played in all matches at the 1998 World Cup. He also played at 1999 Copa America. He played 58 games and scored 4 goals for Japan until 1999.

== Coaching career ==
Soma retired at the end of the 2005 season. After working as a TV pundit, Soma managed the Japan Football League side FC Machida Zelvia in 2010. He held a managerial post in charge of J1 League side Kawasaki Frontale prior to the 2011 season. On April 12, 2012, Kawasaki dismiss coach Naoki Soma after performing 'far below expectations'. The 40-year-old coach was sacked with the club's president stating the team were performing 'far below expectations' having aimed to win the title this term. In 2014, he signed with J3 League side FC Machida Zelvia again. He led the club to won the 2nd place in 2015 and promoted to J2 League. On 14 November 2024, Soma announcement officially appointment manager of Kagoshima United from 2025.

== Career statistics ==
=== Club ===
Appearances and goals by club, season and competition
| Club | Season | League | | Emperor's Cup | | J.League Cup | | Continental | | Total | |
| Club | Season | Apps | Goals | Apps | Goals | Apps | Goals | Apps | Goals | Apps | Goals |
|---|---|---|---|---|---|---|---|---|---|---|---|
| Kashima Antlers | 1994 | 28 | 0 | 1 | 0 | 1 | 0 | – | | 30 | 0 |
| Kashima Antlers | 1995 | 50 | 3 | 4 | 0 | – | | – | | 54 | 3 |
| Kashima Antlers | 1996 | 30 | 2 | 3 | 0 | 14 | 0 | – | | 47 | 2 |
| Kashima Antlers | 1997 | 21 | 0 | 5 | 0 | 2 | 1 | – | | 28 | 1 |
| Kashima Antlers | 1998 | 34 | 1 | 4 | 0 | 1 | 0 | – | | 39 | 1 |
| Kashima Antlers | 1999 | 30 | 0 | 2 | 0 | 7 | 1 | – | | 39 | 1 |
| Kashima Antlers | 2000 | 30 | 2 | 4 | 0 | 7 | 0 | – | | 41 | 2 |
| Kashima Antlers | 2001 | 7 | 0 | 3 | 0 | 1 | 0 | – | | 11 | 0 |
| Kashima Antlers | 2003 | 20 | 2 | 0 | 0 | 3 | 1 | 3 | 0 | 26 | 3 |
| Tokyo Verdy (loan) | 2002 | 27 | 0 | 0 | 0 | 6 | 0 | – | | 33 | 0 |
| Kawasaki Frontale | 2004 | 15 | 0 | 1 | 0 | – | | – | | 16 | 0 |
| Kawasaki Frontale | 2005 | 12 | 0 | 2 | 0 | 3 | 0 | – | | 17 | 0 |
| Total | | 304 | 10 | 29 | 0 | 45 | 3 | 3 | 0 | 381 | 13 |

=== International ===
Appearances and goals by national team and year
| National team | Year | Apps | Goals |
|---|---|---|---|
| Japan | 1995 | 9 | 0 |
| Japan | 1996 | 13 | 2 |
| Japan | 1997 | 21 | 1 |
| Japan | 1998 | 10 | 1 |
| Japan | 1999 | 5 | 0 |
| Total | | 58 | 4 |

Scores and results list Japan's goal tally first, score column indicates score after each Soma goal.

List of international goals scored by Naoki Soma
| No. | Date | Venue | Opponent | Score | Result | Competition |
|---|---|---|---|---|---|---|
| 1 | 29 May 1996 | Fukuoka, Japan | Mexico | 3–2 | 3–2 | 1996 Kirin Cup |
| 2 | 12 December 1996 | Al Ain, United Arab Emirates | China | 1–0 | 1–0 | 1996 AFC Asian Cup |
| 3 | 25 March 1997 | Muscat, Oman | Macau | 3–0 | 10–0 | 1998 FIFA World Cup qualification |
| 4 | 17 May 1998 | Tokyo, Japan | Paraguay | 1–1 | 1–1 | 1998 Kirin Cup |

== Managerial statistics ==
Update; December 31, 2018

| Team | From | To | Record | | | | |
| Team | From | To | G | W | D | L | Win % |
|---|---|---|---|---|---|---|---|
| Kawasaki Frontale | 2011 | 2012 | 41 | 16 | 6 | 19 | 39.02 |
| FC Machida Zelvia | 2014 | 2019 | 195 | 93 | 58 | 44 | 47.69 |
| Kashima Antlers | 2021 | 2021 | | | | | |
| Total | | | 236 | 109 | 64 | 63 | 46.19 |

== Honors ==
- J1 League: 1996, 1998, 2000, 2001
- Emperor's Cup: 1997, 2000
- J.League Cup: 1997, 2000, 2002
- Japanese Super Cup: 1997, 1998, 1999

Individual

- J1 League Best Eleven: 1995, 1996, 1997, 1998
- Selected to AFC All Star Team: 1997
- J1 League Fair Play Individual: 1998
