= 1995 Kashima Antlers season =

Kashima Antlers
1995 season
- Chairman: Masaru Suzuki
- Manager: Edu
- Stadium: Kashima Soccer Stadium
- J.League: 7th
- Emperor's Cup: Semifinals
- Top goalscorer: League: Leonardo (17); All: Yoshiyuki Hasegawa (18); Leonardo (18)
- Highest home attendance: 16,628 (vs Verdy Kawasaki, 2 September 1995); 50,093 (vs Nagoya Grampus Eight, 14 October 1995, Tokyo National Stadium)
- Lowest home attendance: 15,144 (vs Sanfrecce Hiroshima, 25 March 1995)
- Average home league attendance: 19,141
Home colours	Away colours

1995 Kashima Antlers season

== Review and events ==
=== League results summary ===
Overall								Home						Away					
Pld	W	D	L	GF	GA	GD	Pts	W	D	L	GF	GA	GD	W	D	L	GF	GA	GD
52	28	0	24	82	79	+3	85	16	0	10	56	35	+21	12	0	14	26	44	−18

Source: J.LEAGUE OFFICIAL RECORD & DATA 1996. ISBN 4-09-102323-1.

=== League results by round ===
J.League Suntory series (first stage)
Round	1	2	3	4	5	6	7	8	9	10	11	12	13	14	15	16	17	18	19	20	21	22	23	24	25	26
Ground	H	A	H	A	H	A	H	H	A	H	A	H	A	H	A	H	A	H	A	A	H	A	H	A	H	A
Result	L	W	W	L	W	W	W	W	W	W	W	W	L	W	L	L	W	L	L	L	W	L	L	L	W	L
Position	9	6	6	7	5	5	3	2	1	1	1	1	2	1	2	2	2	2	2	4	3	6	7	8	8	8

Source: J.LEAGUE OFFICIAL RECORD & DATA 1996. ISBN 4-09-102323-1.
A = Away; H = Home; W = Win; D = Draw; L = Loss

J.League NICOS series (second stage)
Round	1	2	3	4	5	6	7	8	9	10	11	12	13	14	15	16	17	18	19	20	21	22	23	24	25	26
Ground	H	A	H	A	H	H	A	A	H	H	A	H	A	H	A	H	A	A	H	H	A	A	H	A	H	A
Result	L	W	W	L	W	L	W	L	L	W	W	W	L	W	W	L	L	W	W	L	L	W	W	W	L	L
Position	12	8	4	7	4	6	6	7	8	8	7	5	5	5	5	5	5	5	5	5	5	5	5	3	3	6

Source: J.LEAGUE OFFICIAL RECORD & DATA 1996. ISBN 4-09-102323-1.
A = Away; H = Home; W = Win; D = Draw; L = Loss

== Competitions ==
Competitions	Position
J.League	7th / 14 clubs
Emperor's Cup	Semifinals

== Domestic results ==
=== J.League ===
18 March 1995 1st-1	Kashima Antlers	3–4 (V-goal) (a.e.t.)	Yokohama Marinos	Kashima Soccer Stadium
15:04 JST (UTC+09)	Leonardo 17', 65' (pen.); Hasegawa 80'	J. League	Medina Bello 0', 87'; Bisconti 36'; Omura 96'	Attendance: 15,584; Referee: Yoshimi Ogawa; Assistant referees: Masato Nogami, Kenichi Koshiyama; Fourth official: Takao Onshi

22 March 1995 1st-2	Kashiwa Reysol	0–1	Kashima Antlers	Tokyo National Stadium
19:04 JST (UTC+09)		J. League	Kurosaki 24'	Attendance: 42,994; Referee: Juan Carlos Crespi; Assistant referees: Hiroshi Fukuda, Kazuaki Hamaguchi; Fourth official: Yoshikazu Ozaki; Man of the Match: Masaaki Furukawa

25 March 1995 1st-3	Kashima Antlers	2–0	Sanfrecce Hiroshima	Kashima Soccer Stadium
15:00 JST (UTC+09)	Jorginho 33'; Kurosaki 89'	J. League		Attendance: 15,144; Referee: Lutz Fröhlich; Assistant referees: Noboru Ishiyama, Kō Ōishi; Fourth official: Kazuhiko Kumagai; Man of the Match: Jorginho

29 March 1995 1st-4	Shimizu S-Pulse	4–2	Kashima Antlers	Nihondaira Sports Stadium
19:02 JST (UTC+09)	Dias 8', 79'; Toninho 10', 44'	J. League	Jorginho 31', 38'	Attendance: 18,118; Referee: Masayoshi Okada; Assistant referees: Satoru Kawano, Tōru Kamikawa; Fourth official: Toshiyuki Asanuma

1 April 1995 1st-5	Kashima Antlers	2–0	Cerezo Osaka	Kashima Soccer Stadium
19:03 JST (UTC+09)	Jorginho 0'; Hasegawa 49'	J. League		Attendance: 15,335; Referee: Kiyoshi Ōta; Assistant referees: Takashi Kunori, Hisaharu Kitamura; Fourth official: Masao Komada; Man of the Match: Jorginho

5 April 1995 1st-6	Yokohama Flügels	0–1	Kashima Antlers	Yokohama Mitsuzawa Football Stadium
19:03 JST (UTC+09)		J. League	Kurosaki 64'	Attendance: 13,753; Referee: Tatsumi Ōno; Assistant referees: Yū Nakamura, Tōru Kamikawa; Fourth official: Takeshi Ōgiya; Man of the Match: Hisashi Kurosaki

8 April 1995 1st-7	Kashima Antlers	1–0	Verdy Kawasaki	Kashima Soccer Stadium
19:31 JST (UTC+09)	Hasegawa 84'	J. League		Attendance: 15,825; Referee: Yoshimi Ogawa; Assistant referees: Kazuhisa Osada, Toshimitsu Yoshida; Fourth official: Atsushi Fujigasaki; Man of the Match: Yasuto Honda

12 April 1995 1st-8	Kashima Antlers	3–1	JEF United Ichihara	Kashima Soccer Stadium
19:01 JST (UTC+09)	Leonardo 25' (pen.); Hasegawa 27', 61'	J. League	Rufer 56' (pen.)	Attendance: 15,195; Referee: Juan Carlos Crespi; Assistant referees: Kimio Izaki, Kō Ōishi; Fourth official: Toshio Itō; Man of the Match: Yoshiyuki Hasegawa

15 April 1995 1st-9	Gamba Osaka	1–3	Kashima Antlers	Expo '70 Commemorative Stadium
15:03 JST (UTC+09)	Yamaguchi 30' (pen.)	J. League	Leonardo 26'; Sōma 45'; Santos 70'	Attendance: 17,769; Referee: Hiroyuki Umemoto; Assistant referees: Hiroshi Tanabe, Akio Okutani; Fourth official: Tsuyoshi Miyake; Man of the Match: Santos

22 April 1995 1st-10	Kashima Antlers	4–0	Nagoya Grampus Eight	Kashima Soccer Stadium
15:04 JST (UTC+09)	Hasegawa 4'; Kurosaki 17', 27'; Jorginho 89'	J. League		Attendance: 15,273; Referee: Yōtarō Moritsu; Assistant referees: Kazuaki Hamaguchi, Toshimitsu Yoshida; Fourth official: Shigemi Tominaga; Man of the Match: Hisashi Kurosaki

26 April 1995 1st-11	Júbilo Iwata	0–1 (V-goal) (a.e.t.)	Kashima Antlers	Júbilo Iwata Stadium
19:00 JST (UTC+09)		J. League	Manaka 91'	Attendance: 17,357; Referee: Hideo Kikuchi; Assistant referees: Yoshikazu Hiroshima, Yasushi Tsuchimoto; Fourth official: Toshiaki Futamata; Man of the Match: Ryōsuke Okuno

29 April 1995 1st-12	Kashima Antlers	1–0 (V-goal) (a.e.t.)	Urawa Red Diamonds	Kashima Soccer Stadium
15:01 JST (UTC+09)	Leonardo 94' (pen.)	J. League		Attendance: 15,962; Referee: Armando Perez; Assistant referees: Takashi Kunori, Masato Nogami; Fourth official: Toshimitsu Teruyama; Man of the Match: Santos

3 May 1995 1st-13	Bellmare Hiratsuka	7–0	Kashima Antlers	Hiratsuka Stadium
15:00 JST (UTC+09)	Nakata 35'; Noguchi 53', 65', 71', 73', 85'; Betinho 69'	J. League		Attendance: 15,709; Referee: Lutz Fröhlich; Assistant referees: Kazuaki Hamaguchi, Takayoshi Kashino; Fourth official: Mitsune Yamaguchi

6 May 1995 1st-14	Kashima Antlers	4–0	Kashiwa Reysol	Kashima Soccer Stadium
16:04 JST (UTC+09)	Kurosaki 11'; Hasegawa 15', 44'; Leonardo 70'	J. League		Attendance: 15,816; Referee: Hideo Kikuchi; Assistant referees: Tetsu Karakida, Akihisa Makino; Fourth official: Takao Onshi; Man of the Match: Yoshiyuki Hasegawa

10 May 1995 1st-15	Sanfrecce Hiroshima	3–0	Kashima Antlers	Hiroshima Big Arch
19:04 JST (UTC+09)	Van Loen 22', 82'; Huistra 58' (pen.)	J. League		Attendance: 13,143; Referee: Yoshitsugu Katayama; Assistant referees: Kazuaki Hamaguchi, Naoki Esumi; Fourth official: Kazuyuki Tanimoto

13 May 1995 1st-16	Kashima Antlers	0–1	Shimizu S-Pulse	Kashima Soccer Stadium
16:05 JST (UTC+09)		J. League	Dias 22'	Attendance: 15,813; Referee: Naotsugu Fuse; Assistant referees: Takeshi Ōkura, Takayoshi Kashino; Fourth official: Michio Horie

17 June 1995 1st-17	Cerezo Osaka	0–0 (V-goal) (a.e.t.) (2–4 p)	Kashima Antlers	Osaka Nagai No.2 Stadium
19:05 JST (UTC+09)		J. League		Attendance: 13,748; Referee: Yoshitsugu Katayama; Assistant referees: Morihisa Yamaguchi, Mikio Fukuoka; Fourth official: Tsuyoshi Miyake; Man of the Match: Masaaki Furukawa
	Penalties
	(penalty scored) Marquinhos; (penalty missed) Yamahashi; (penalty scored) Kanda; (penalty missed) Kurata		(penalty scored) Leonardo; (penalty scored) Santos; (penalty scored) Kurosaki; (penalty scored) Hasegawa

21 June 1995 1st-18	Kashima Antlers	2–3	Yokohama Flügels	Kashima Soccer Stadium
19:04 JST (UTC+09)	Santos 3' (pen.); Kurosaki 15'	J. League	Maezono 56'; Yamaguchi 73'; 89' (o.g.)	Attendance: 15,263; Referee: Juan Carlos Crespi; Assistant referees: Yasuhiro Matsuzaki, Tetsu Karakida; Fourth official: Masao Komada

24 June 1995 1st-19	Verdy Kawasaki	3–1	Kashima Antlers	Kawasaki Todoroki Stadium
19:30 JST (UTC+09)	Alcindo 44'; Kitazawa 69'; Takeda 76'	J. League	Koga 79'	Attendance: 13,602; Referee: Kiyoshi Ōta; Assistant referees: Yasushi Tsuchimoto, Kazuhisa Osada; Fourth official: Hideaki Ishii

28 June 1995 1st-20	JEF United Ichihara	2–1	Kashima Antlers	Ichihara Stadium
19:03 JST (UTC+09)	Niimura 32'; Ejiri 51'	J. League	Santos 78' (pen.)	Attendance: 14,065; Referee: Hideo Kikuchi; Assistant referees: Hiroshi Fukuda, Takashi Kunori; Fourth official: Eita Horikawa

1 July 1995 1st-21	Kashima Antlers	2–1	Gamba Osaka	Ishikawa Kanazawa Stadium
19:02 JST (UTC+09)	Santos 3'; Hasegawa 24'	J. League	Gillhaus 32'	Attendance: 18,746; Referee: Yōtarō Moritsu; Assistant referees: Kazuya Yanagisawa, Kōji Taniuchi; Fourth official: Tsutomu Kaji; Man of the Match: Santos

8 July 1995 1st-22	Nagoya Grampus Eight	2–0	Kashima Antlers	Nagoya Mizuho Athletics Stadium
18:30 JST (UTC+09)	Stojković 81'; Moriyama 84'	J. League		Attendance: 21,794; Referee: Yoshitsugu Katayama; Assistant referees: Morihisa Yamaguchi, Yasushi Tsuchimoto; Fourth official: Yūji Kōda

12 July 1995 1st-23	Kashima Antlers	1–2	Júbilo Iwata	Kashima Soccer Stadium
19:05 JST (UTC+09)	Honda 85'	J. League	Endō 7'; Schillaci 48'	Attendance: 15,401; Referee: Tatsumi Ōno; Assistant referees: Masahiro Katagiri, Takashi Kunori; Fourth official: Toshio Itō

15 July 1995 1st-24	Urawa Red Diamonds	2–1	Kashima Antlers	Omiya Football Stadium
18:33 JST (UTC+09)	Buchwald 61'; Okano 85'	J. League	Honda 43'	Attendance: 10,019; Referee: Kiyoshi Ōta; Assistant referees: Hiroshi Fukuda, Tetsuya Hamana; Fourth official: Keiichi Sunakawa

19 July 1995 1st-25	Kashima Antlers	2–1	Bellmare Hiratsuka	Kashima Soccer Stadium
19:03 JST (UTC+09)	Honda 66'; Santos 75' (pen.)	J. League	Noguchi 41'	Attendance: 15,687; Referee: Armando Perez; Assistant referees: Hitoshi Yamada, Masato Nogami; Fourth official: Kazuhiko Kumagai; Man of the Match: Santos

22 July 1995 1st-26	Yokohama Marinos	1–0	Kashima Antlers	Yokohama Mitsuzawa Football Stadium
19:03 JST (UTC+09)	Medina Bello 12'	J. League		Attendance: 14,127; Referee: Masayoshi Okada; Assistant referees: Yasuhiro Matsuzaki, Takayoshi Kashino; Fourth official: Junichi Sasaki

12 August 1995 2nd-1	Kashima Antlers	0–2	Yokohama Marinos	Kashima Soccer Stadium
19:02 JST (UTC+09)		J. League	T. Suzuki 68'; Medina Bello 73'	Attendance: 16,162; Referee: Zoran Petrović; Assistant referees: Hiroshi Fukuda, Toshimitsu Yoshida; Fourth official: Wakao Namatame

16 August 1995 2nd-2	Júbilo Iwata	0–2	Kashima Antlers	Júbilo Iwata Stadium
19:02 JST (UTC+09)		J. League	Kurosaki 23'; Hashimoto 74'	Attendance: 18,251; Referee: Hiroyuki Umemoto; Assistant referees: Yasuhiro Hemmi, Takayoshi Kashino; Fourth official: Tōru Nagata; Man of the Match: Ryōsuke Okuno

19 August 1995 2nd-3	Kashima Antlers	5–1	JEF United Ichihara	Kashima Soccer Stadium
18:00 JST (UTC+09)	Jorginho 34' (pen.); Sōma 44'; Hasegawa 60', 62'; Kurosaki 85'	J. League	Ejiri 11'	Attendance: 15,783; Referee: Masayoshi Okada; Assistant referees: Hiroshi Fukuda, Hisaharu Kitamura; Fourth official: Atsushi Fujigasaki; Man of the Match: Yoshiyuki Hasegawa

23 August 1995 2nd-4	Nagoya Grampus Eight	2–1	Kashima Antlers	Nagoya Mizuho Athletics Stadium
19:00 JST (UTC+09)	Durix 21'; Nakanishi 63'	J. League	Masuda 68'	Attendance: 22,028; Referee: Naotsugu Fuse; Assistant referees: Tōru Yamashiro, Akio Okutani; Fourth official: N. Yoshida (吉田 文久)

26 August 1995 2nd-5	Kashima Antlers	4–0	Gamba Osaka	Kashima Soccer Stadium
18:04 JST (UTC+09)	Hasegawa 27', 61', 74'; Masuda 80'	J. League		Attendance: 16,110; Referee: Tatsumi Ōno; Assistant referees: Takashi Kunori, Masato Nogami; Fourth official: Kazuhiko Kumagai; Man of the Match: Yoshiyuki Hasegawa

2 September 1995 2nd-6	Kashima Antlers	1–5	Verdy Kawasaki	Kashima Soccer Stadium
19:05 JST (UTC+09)	Hashimoto 71'	J. League	Takeda 35'; Miura 42', 55', 64'; Kitazawa 83'	Attendance: 16,628; Referee: Alfredo Trentalange; Assistant referees: Toshiyuki Mayuzumi, Kō Ōishi; Fourth official: Takao Onshi

6 September 1995 2nd-7	Yokohama Flügels	1–2	Kashima Antlers	Tokyo National Stadium
19:04 JST (UTC+09)	Evair 76'	J. League	Kurosaki 9'; Jorginho 37'	Attendance: 41,239; Referee: Hideo Kikuchi; Assistant referees: Mitsuru Satō, Toshimitsu Yoshida; Fourth official: Keizō Yamazaki; Man of the Match: Jorginho

9 September 1995 2nd-8	Cerezo Osaka	1–0	Kashima Antlers	Oita Athletic Stadium
19:00 JST (UTC+09)	Marquinhos 89' (pen.)	J. League		Attendance: 9,056; Referee: Fumikazu Shioyazono; Assistant referees: Hideaki Harada, Hiroyuki Izumi; Fourth official: Takanobu Kudō

13 September 1995 2nd-9	Kashima Antlers	2–3 (V-goal) (a.e.t.)	Shimizu S-Pulse	Kashima Soccer Stadium
19:03 JST (UTC+09)	Masuda 87', 87'	J. League	Massaro 17'; Dias 84' 106'	Attendance: 16,093; Referee: Armando Perez; Assistant referees: Hiroshi Fukuda, Takashi Kunori; Fourth official: Michio Horie

16 September 1995 2nd-10	Kashima Antlers	4–3	Kashiwa Reysol	Tokyo National Stadium
19:05 JST (UTC+09)	Kurosaki 34'; Leonardo 36', 43' (pen.); Mazinho 79'	J. League	Tanada 11'; N. Katō 70' (pen.); Yokoyama 81'	Attendance: 35,822; Referee: Alfredo Trentalange; Assistant referees: Yū Nakamura, Mitsuru Satō; Fourth official: Hide Lii; Man of the Match: Leonardo

23 September 1995 2nd-11	Sanfrecce Hiroshima	1–2	Kashima Antlers	Hiroshima Big Arch
15:03 JST (UTC+09)	Michiki 47'	J. League	Leonardo 39', 50'	Attendance: 13,025; Referee: Hideo Kikuchi; Assistant referees: Hiroshi Tanabe, Hideaki Harada; Fourth official: Masahiro Katsuyama; Man of the Match: Leonardo

27 September 1995 2nd-12	Kashima Antlers	2–0	Urawa Red Diamonds	Kashima Soccer Stadium
19:00 JST (UTC+09)	Leonardo 8', 66'	J. League		Attendance: 15,819; Referee: Kenji Tanaka; Assistant referees: Kazuaki Hamaguchi, Kimio Izaki; Fourth official: Toshio Itō; Man of the Match: Leonardo

30 September 1995 2nd-13	Bellmare Hiratsuka	2–1 (V-goal) (a.e.t.)	Kashima Antlers	Hiratsuka Stadium
19:03 JST (UTC+09)	Noguchi 37'; Simão 108'	J. League	Leonardo 69'	Attendance: 14,663; Referee: Naotsugu Fuse; Assistant referees: Kazuaki Hamaguchi, Toshimitsu Yoshida; Fourth official: Hiroshi Yashiro

4 October 1995 2nd-14	Kashima Antlers	1–0	Júbilo Iwata	Kashima Soccer Stadium
19:03 JST (UTC+09)	Okuno 50'	J. League		Attendance: 15,599; Referee: Zoran Petrović; Assistant referees: Hitoshi Yamada, Kenichi Koshiyama; Fourth official: Atsushi Fujigasaki; Man of the Match: Ryōsuke Okuno

7 October 1995 2nd-15	JEF United Ichihara	0–0 (V-goal) (a.e.t.) (2–4 p)	Kashima Antlers	Ichihara Stadium
15:03 JST (UTC+09)		J. League		Attendance: 13,032; Referee: Yasuhiro Matsuzaki; Assistant referees: Tetsu Karakida, Hisaharu Kitamura; Fourth official: Fujirō Masukura; Man of the Match: Yōhei Satō
	Penalties
	(penalty scored) Jō; (penalty missed) Ejiri; (penalty missed) Y. Gotō; (penalty scored) Shimokawa		(penalty scored) Manaka; (penalty missed) Akita; (penalty scored) Honda; (penalty scored) Ōno; (penalty scored) Masuda

14 October 1995 2nd-16	Kashima Antlers	1–3	Nagoya Grampus Eight	Tokyo National Stadium
15:03 JST (UTC+09)	86' (o.g.)	J. League	Stojković 66'; Hirano 77'; Moriyama 81'	Attendance: 50,093; Referee: Tatsumi Ōno; Assistant referees: Kazuya Yanagisawa, Naoyuki Mori; Fourth official: Yoshikazu Ozaki

18 October 1995 2nd-17	Gamba Osaka	3–1	Kashima Antlers	Expo '70 Commemorative Stadium
19:00 JST (UTC+09)	Yamamura 11'; Gillhaus 54', 62'	J. League	Leonardo 83' (pen.)	Attendance: 12,820; Referee: Shinichirō Obata; Assistant referees: Yoshikazu Hiroshima, Akio Okutani; Fourth official: Tsuyoshi Miyake

21 October 1995 2nd-18	Verdy Kawasaki	0–1	Kashima Antlers	Kawasaki Todoroki Stadium
15:01 JST (UTC+09)		J. League	Leonardo 58' (pen.)	Attendance: 20,974; Referee: Armando Perez; Assistant referees: Mitsuru Satō, Takuji Fukazawa; Fourth official: Kazuhiko Uchida; Man of the Match: Mozer

1 November 1995 2nd-19	Kashima Antlers	5–1	Yokohama Flügels	Kashima Soccer Stadium
19:05 JST (UTC+09)	Sōma 6'; Mazinho 20'; Leonardo 74', 83'; Jorginho 89'	J. League	Takada 71'	Attendance: 15,508; Referee: Fumikazu Shioyazono; Assistant referees: Masahiro Katagiri, Kō Ōishi; Fourth official: Mitsuru Katō; Man of the Match: Leonardo

4 November 1995 2nd-20	Kashima Antlers	2–2 (V-goal) (a.e.t.) (5–6 p)	Cerezo Osaka	Tokyo National Stadium
19:32 JST (UTC+09)	Hasegawa 78'; Mazinho 89'	J. League	Morishima 37', 44'	Attendance: 47,653; Referee: Masayoshi Okada; Assistant referees: Hiroshi Fukuda, Noboru Ishiyama; Fourth official: Yoshikazu Ozaki
	Penalties
	(penalty scored) Jorginho; (penalty scored) Mazinho; (penalty scored) Hasegawa; (penalty missed) Kurita; (penalty missed) Akita; (penalty scored) Honda; (penalty scored) Sōma; (penalty missed) Naitō		(penalty missed) Minamoto; (penalty scored) Fukagawa; (penalty missed) Yamahashi; (penalty scored) Murata; (penalty scored) Kajino; (penalty scored) Kanda; (penalty scored) Bernardo; (penalty scored) Morishima

8 November 1995 2nd-21	Shimizu S-Pulse	3–0	Kashima Antlers	Nihondaira Sports Stadium
19:00 JST (UTC+09)	Marco 65'; T. Itō 74'; Morioka 78'	J. League		Attendance: 18,222; Referee: Yoshitsugu Katayama; Assistant referees: Hiroshi Tanabe, Kazuhisa Osada; Fourth official: Naoki Uchiyama

11 November 1995 2nd-22	Kashiwa Reysol	3–3 (V-goal) (a.e.t.) (2–4 p)	Kashima Antlers	Kashiwa Hitachi Stadium
14:01 JST (UTC+09)	Careca 7' (pen.); Tanada 51'; Date 58'	J. League	Masuda 1', 48'; Hasegawa 18'	Attendance: 14,273; Referee: Yoshimi Ogawa; Assistant referees: Kimio Izaki, Kō Ōishi; Fourth official: Terunobu Kakinuma; Man of the Match: Jorginho
	Penalties
	(penalty scored) Careca; (penalty missed) Date; (penalty scored) Nelsinho; (penalty missed) Valdir		(penalty scored) Jorginho; (penalty scored) Hasegawa; (penalty scored) Manaka; (penalty scored) Honda

15 November 1995 2nd-23	Kashima Antlers	2–1 (V-goal) (a.e.t.)	Sanfrecce Hiroshima	Kashima Soccer Stadium
19:04 JST (UTC+09)	Manaka 83' 99'	J. League	Huistra 4'	Attendance: 15,648; Referee: Jamal Al-Sharif; Assistant referees: Tatsumi Ōno, Hiroshi Fukuda; Fourth official: Tōru Kamikawa; Man of the Match: Yasuo Manaka

18 November 1995 2nd-24	Urawa Red Diamonds	0–2	Kashima Antlers	Urawa Komaba Stadium
15:03 JST (UTC+09)		J. League	Kumagai 43'; Mazinho 89'	Attendance: 19,660; Referee: Masayoshi Okada; Assistant referees: Takeshi Ōkura, Kazuhisa Osada; Fourth official: Masahisa Kajiwara; Man of the Match: Ichiei Muroi

22 November 1995 2nd-25	Kashima Antlers	0–1	Bellmare Hiratsuka	Kashima Soccer Stadium
19:00 JST (UTC+09)		J. League	Edson 27'	Attendance: 15,703; Referee: Yasuhiro Matsuzaki; Assistant referees: Kimio Izaki, Kō Ōishi; Fourth official: Kunihiro Ōtsuki

25 November 1995 2nd-26	Yokohama Marinos	3–0	Kashima Antlers	Yokohama Mitsuzawa Football Stadium
15:02 JST (UTC+09)	Ueno 20'; Bisconti 46', 84' (pen.)	J. League		Attendance: 11,939; Referee: Jamal Al-Sharif; Assistant referees: Kazuaki Hamaguchi, Naoki Esumi; Fourth official: Mitsune Yamaguchi

=== Emperor's Cup ===
3 December 1995 1st Round	Tokyo Gas	0–1	Kashima Antlers	Kashima Soccer Stadium
: JST (UTC+09)			Hasegawa 18'

10 December 1995 2nd Round	Cerezo Osaka	1–2	Kashima Antlers	Saga Stadium
: JST (UTC+09)	Fukagawa 82'		Leonardo 4'; Naitō 15'

17 December 1995 Quarterfinals	Fukuoka Blux	2–3	Kashima Antlers	Hakatanomori Football Stadium
: JST (UTC+09)	H. Nagai 7', 19'		Mazinho 25', 77'; Masuda 86'

23 December 1995 Semifinals	Kashima Antlers	1–5	Nagoya Grampus Eight	Tokyo National Stadium
: JST (UTC+09)	Hasegawa 42'		Ogura 18', 32'; Asano 54'; Okayama 66'; Durix 85'	Attendance: 34,803

== Player statistics ==
No.	Pos	Nat	Player	Total		J-League		Emperor's Cup	
No.	Pos	Nat	Player	Apps	Goals	Apps	Goals	Apps	Goals
	GK	(Japan) JPN	Masaaki Furukawa	26	0	26	0	0	0
	GK	(Japan) JPN	Yōhei Satō	30	0	26	0	4	0
	GK	(Japan) JPN	Hideaki Ozawa	0	0	0	0	0	0
	GK	(Japan) JPN	Tomoya Ichikawa	0	0	0	0	0	0
	DF	(Brazil) BRA	Jorginho	32	8	29	8	3	0
	DF	(Japan) JPN	Shunzō Ōno	25	0	25	0	0	0
	DF	(Japan) JPN	Naruyuki Naitō	36	1	32	0	4	1
	DF	(Japan) JPN	Ryōsuke Okuno	44	1	40	1	4	0
	DF	(Japan) JPN	Eiji Gaya	16	0	16	0	0	0
	DF	(Japan) JPN	Yutaka Akita	54	0	50	0	4	0
	DF	(Japan) JPN	Naoki Soma	54	3	50	3	4	0
	DF	(Japan) JPN	Kenichi Serata	0	0	0	0	0	0
	DF	(Japan) JPN	Ichiei Muroi	7	0	3	0	4	0
	DF	(Japan) JPN	Masafumi Mizuki	0	0	0	0	0	0
	DF	(Japan) JPN	Toshiyuki Abe	14	0	14	0	0	0
	DF	(Japan) JPN	Taijirō Kurita	13	0	13	0	0	0
	DF	(Japan) JPN	Masaki Ogawa	2	0	2	0	0	0
	DF	(Japan) JPN	Ryūzō Morioka	0	0	0	0	0	0
	MF	(Brazil) BRA	Santos	25	5	25	5	0	0
	MF	(Japan) JPN	Masatada Ishii	33	0	30	0	3	0
	FW	(Japan) JPN	Hisashi Kurosaki (Note: His position was MF in Suntory series.)	39	11	39	11	0	0
	MF	(Japan) JPN	Yasuto Honda	53	3	49	3	4	0
	MF	(Brazil) BRA	Leonardo	31	18	28	17	3	1
	MF	(Japan) JPN	Tadatoshi Masuda	39	7	35	6	4	1
	MF	(Japan) JPN	Tōru Oniki	4	0	4	0	0	0
	MF	(Japan) JPN	Kōji Kumagai	6	1	6	1	0	0
	FW	(Japan) JPN	Yoshiyuki Hasegawa	46	18	42	16	4	2
	MF	(Japan) JPN	Satoshi Koga (Note: His position was FW in Suntory series.)	15	1	15	1	0	0
	FW	(Japan) JPN	Yasuo Manaka	26	3	23	3	3	0
	FW	(Japan) JPN	Kōji Takeda	0	0	0	0	0	0
	FW	(Japan) JPN	Masaaki Ueki	0	0	0	0	0	0
	FW	(Japan) JPN	Kenichi Hashimoto	15	2	15	2	0	0
	FW	(Japan) JPN	Takayuki Suzuki	0	0	0	0	0	0
	DF	(Brazil) BRA	Mozer †	18	0	15	0	3	0
	FW	(Brazil) BRA	Mazinho †	11	6	9	4	2	2

- † player(s) joined the team after the opening of this season.

== Transfers ==
In:

No.	Pos.	Nation	Player
—	DF	BRA	Jorginho (from FC Bayern München)
—	MF	JPN	Toshiyuki Abe (from University of Tsukuba)
—	FW	JPN	Takayuki Suzuki (from Hitachi Technical High School)

Out:

No.	Pos.	Nation	Player
—	GK	JPN	Osamu Chiba (to Kashiwa Reysol)
—	DF	JPN	Kenji Ōba (to Kashiwa Reysol)
—	DF	JPN	Kazuhisa Irii (to Kashiwa Reysol)
—	MF	BRA	Alcindo
—	MF	JPN	Yasuhiro Yoshida (to Shimizu S-Pulse)
—	MF	JPN	Edinho
—	FW	JPN	Kenji Okamoto

== Transfers during the season ==
=== In ===
- (Brazil) Carlos Mozer (from Benfica on July)
- (Brazil) Mazinho (from Flamengo on September)

=== Out ===
- (Brazil) Santos (to Shimizu S-Pulse on August)
- (Japan) Ryūzō Morioka (to Shimizu S-Pulse)

== Awards ==
- J.League Best XI: (Japan) Naoki Soma

== Other pages ==
- (in Japanese) J. League official site
- (in Japanese) Kashima Antlers official site
