= 1999 Kashima Antlers season =

Kashima Antlers
1999 season
- Manager: Zé Mário; Zico; Takashi Sekizuka
- Stadium: Kashima Soccer Stadium
- J.League 1: 9th
- Emperor's Cup: 4th Round
- J.League Cup: Runners-up
- Top goalscorer: Atsushi Yanagisawa (9)
Home colours	Away colours

1999 Kashima Antlers season

== Competitions ==
Competitions	Position
J.League 1	9th / 16 clubs
Emperor's Cup	4th round
J.League Cup	Runners-up

== Domestic results ==
=== J.League 1 ===
6 March 1999 1-1	Kashima Antlers	4-0	JEF United Ichihara	Tokyo National Stadium
JST (UTC+09)

13 March 1999 1-2	Vissel Kobe	1-2	Kashima Antlers	Kobe Universiade Memorial Stadium
JST (UTC+09)

20 March 1999 1-3	Kashima Antlers	1-0	Sanfrecce Hiroshima	Tokyo National Stadium
JST (UTC+09)

27 March 1999 1-4	Verdy Kawasaki	2-1	Kashima Antlers	Tokyo National Stadium
JST (UTC+09)

3 April 1999 1-5	Kashima Antlers	4-2	Bellmare Hiratsuka	Ishikawa Kanazawa Stadium
JST (UTC+09)

10 April 1999 1-6	Kyoto Purple Sanga	1-2 (GG) (a.e.t.)	Kashima Antlers	Nishikyogoku Athletic Stadium
JST (UTC+09)

19 May 1999 1-7	Kashima Antlers	1-2	Kashiwa Reysol	Tokyo National Stadium
JST (UTC+09)

24 April 1999 1-8	Yokohama F. Marinos	3-3 (GG) (a.e.t.)	Kashima Antlers	International Stadium Yokohama
JST (UTC+09)

28 April 1999 1-9	Kashima Antlers	0-1	Shimizu S-Pulse	Tokyo National Stadium
JST (UTC+09)

1 May 1999 1-10	Cerezo Osaka	1-0	Kashima Antlers	Osaka Nagai Stadium
JST (UTC+09)

5 May 1999 1-11	Kashima Antlers	1-2 (GG) (a.e.t.)	Júbilo Iwata	Tokyo National Stadium
JST (UTC+09)

8 May 1999 1-12	Kashima Antlers	3-0	Avispa Fukuoka	Toyama Athletic Stadium
JST (UTC+09)

15 May 1999 1-13	Urawa Red Diamonds	1-0	Kashima Antlers	Tokyo National Stadium
JST (UTC+09)

22 May 1999 1-14	Kashima Antlers	1-2 (GG) (a.e.t.)	Nagoya Grampus Eight	Tokyo National Stadium
JST (UTC+09)

29 May 1999 1-15	Gamba Osaka	1-0	Kashima Antlers	Osaka Expo '70 Stadium
JST (UTC+09)

7 August 1999 2-1	Kashiwa Reysol	2-1	Kashima Antlers	Kashiwanoha Park Stadium
JST (UTC+09)

14 August 1999 2-2	Kashima Antlers	2-3	Yokohama F. Marinos	Kashima Soccer Stadium
JST (UTC+09)

18 August 1999 2-3	Shimizu S-Pulse	2-0	Kashima Antlers	Nihondaira Sports Stadium
JST (UTC+09)

21 August 1999 2-4	Kashima Antlers	1-2 (GG) (a.e.t.)	Cerezo Osaka	Kashima Soccer Stadium
JST (UTC+09)

28 August 1999 2-5	Júbilo Iwata	0-4	Kashima Antlers	Júbilo Iwata Stadium
JST (UTC+09)

4 September 1999 2-6	Avispa Fukuoka	2-3	Kashima Antlers	Hakatanomori Football Stadium
JST (UTC+09)

11 September 1999 2-7	Kashima Antlers	2-1 (GG) (a.e.t.)	Urawa Red Diamonds	Kashima Soccer Stadium
JST (UTC+09)

15 September 1999 2-8	Nagoya Grampus Eight	3-1	Kashima Antlers	Mizuho Athletic Stadium
JST (UTC+09)

18 September 1999 2-9	Kashima Antlers	1-0 (GG) (a.e.t.)	Gamba Osaka	Kashima Soccer Stadium
JST (UTC+09)

23 September 1999 2-10	JEF United Ichihara	0-2	Kashima Antlers	Tokyo National Stadium
JST (UTC+09)

30 October 1999 2-11	Sanfrecce Hiroshima	1-0	Kashima Antlers	Hiroshima Big Arch
JST (UTC+09)

17 November 1999 2-12	Kashima Antlers	0-1 (GG) (a.e.t.)	Vissel Kobe	Kashima Soccer Stadium
JST (UTC+09)

20 November 1999 2-13	Kashima Antlers	5-0	Kyoto Purple Sanga	Kashima Soccer Stadium
JST (UTC+09)

23 November 1999 2-14	Bellmare Hiratsuka	0-6	Kashima Antlers	Hiratsuka Athletics Stadium
JST (UTC+09)

27 November 1999 2-15	Kashima Antlers	2-1	Verdy Kawasaki	Kashima Soccer Stadium
JST (UTC+09)

=== Emperor's Cup ===
1st Round	bye

2nd Round	bye

12 December 1999 3rd Round	Kashima Antlers	1-0	Sagan Tosu	Tosu Stadium
JST (UTC+09)

19 December 1999 4th Round	Kashima Antlers	1-2	Nagoya Grampus Eight	Mizuho Athletic Stadium
JST (UTC+09)

=== J.League Cup ===
1st Round	bye

12 June 1999 2nd Round-1	Gamba Osaka	1-1	Kashima Antlers	Osaka Expo '70 Stadium
JST (UTC+09)

19 June 1999 2nd Round-2	Kashima Antlers	1-0 (2-1 agg.)	Gamba Osaka	Akita Yabase Stadium
JST (UTC+09)

20 July 1999 Quarterfinals-1	Urawa Red Diamonds	2-0	Kashima Antlers	Urawa Komaba Stadium
JST (UTC+09)

24 July 1999 Quarterfinals-2	Kashima Antlers	3-0 (GG) (a.e.t.) (3-2 agg.)	Urawa Red Diamonds	Kashima Soccer Stadium
JST (UTC+09)

29 September 1999 Semifinals-1	Kashima Antlers	2-0	FC Tokyo	Kashima Soccer Stadium
JST (UTC+09)

6 October 1999 Semifinals-2	FC Tokyo	1-1 (1-3 agg.)	Kashima Antlers	Tokyo National Stadium
JST (UTC+09)

3 November 1999 Final	Kashiwa Reysol	2-2 (GG) (a.e.t.) (5-4 p)	Kashima Antlers	Tokyo National Stadium
JST (UTC+09)		J.League

== Player statistics ==
No.	Pos.	Nat.	Player	D.o.B. (Age)	Height / Weight	J.League 1		Emperor's Cup		J.League Cup		Total	
No.	Pos.	Nat.	Player	D.o.B. (Age)	Height / Weight	Apps	Goals	Apps	Goals	Apps	Goals	Apps	Goals
1	GK	(Japan)	Masaaki Furukawa	August 28, 1968 (aged 30)	cm / kg	0	0						
2	DF	(Japan)	Akira Narahashi	November 26, 1971 (aged 27)	cm / kg	15	2						
3	DF	(Japan)	Yutaka Akita	August 6, 1970 (aged 28)	cm / kg	28	2						
4	DF	(Japan)	Ryosuke Okuno	November 13, 1968 (aged 30)	cm / kg	18	0						
5	DF	(Japan)	Naruyuki Naito	November 9, 1967 (aged 31)	cm / kg	19	0						
6	MF	(Japan)	Yasuto Honda	June 25, 1969 (aged 29)	cm / kg	17	0						
7	DF	(Japan)	Naoki Soma	July 19, 1971 (aged 27)	cm / kg	30	0						
8	FW	(Brazil)	Mazinho Oliveira	December 26, 1965 (aged 33)	cm / kg	17	6						
9	FW	(Japan)	Takayuki Suzuki	June 5, 1976 (aged 22)	cm / kg	1	0						
10	MF	(Brazil)	Bismarck	September 17, 1969 (aged 29)	cm / kg	23	7						
11	FW	(Japan)	Yoshiyuki Hasegawa	February 11, 1969 (aged 30)	cm / kg	21	4						
13	FW	(Japan)	Atsushi Yanagisawa	May 27, 1977 (aged 21)	cm / kg	26	9						
14	MF	(Japan)	Tadatoshi Masuda	December 25, 1973 (aged 25)	cm / kg	5	2						
15	DF	(Japan)	Ichiei Muroi	June 22, 1974 (aged 24)	cm / kg	8	0						
16	MF	(Japan)	Toshiyuki Abe	August 1, 1974 (aged 24)	cm / kg	26	2						
17	MF	(Japan)	Toru Oniki	April 20, 1974 (aged 24)	cm / kg	7	1						
18	MF	(Japan)	Koji Kumagai	October 23, 1975 (aged 23)	cm / kg	10	3						
19	FW	(Japan)	Tomoyuki Hirase	May 23, 1977 (aged 21)	cm / kg	22	5						
20	DF	(Brazil)	Ricardo	February 23, 1977 (aged 22)	cm / kg	16	2						
21	GK	(Japan)	Daijiro Takakuwa	August 10, 1973 (aged 25)	cm / kg	26	0						
22	DF	(Japan)	Seiji Kaneko	May 27, 1980 (aged 18)	cm / kg	0	0						
23	MF	(Japan)	Takeshi Yamaguchi	June 10, 1979 (aged 19)	cm / kg	0	0						
24	MF	(Japan)	Masashi Motoyama	June 20, 1979 (aged 19)	cm / kg	18	0						
25	DF	(Japan)	Yoshiro Nakamura	October 17, 1979 (aged 19)	cm / kg	2	0						
26	MF	(Japan)	Kōji Nakata	July 9, 1979 (aged 19)	cm / kg	17	4						
27	MF	(Japan)	Mitsuo Ogasawara	April 5, 1979 (aged 19)	cm / kg	15	4						
28	GK	(Japan)	Hitoshi Sogahata	August 2, 1979 (aged 19)	cm / kg	4	0						
29	GK	(Japan)	Shinya Kato	September 19, 1980 (aged 18)	cm / kg	0	0						
30	FW	(Japan)	Yasutaka Kobayashi	June 15, 1980 (aged 18)	cm / kg	0	0						
31	DF	(Japan)	Toshihiro Yahata	May 29, 1980 (aged 18)	cm / kg	0	0						
32	DF	(Japan)	Ryuta Matsushima	November 12, 1980 (aged 18)	cm / kg	0	0						
33	FW	(Japan)	Jo Nakajima	July 3, 1980 (aged 18)	cm / kg	1	0						
34	MF	(Japan)	Takuya Nozawa	August 12, 1981 (aged 17)	cm / kg	1	0						

== Other pages ==
- (in Japanese) J.League official site
