= 1998 Kashima Antlers season =

Kashima Antlers
1998 season
- Manager: João Carlos; Takashi Sekizuka; Zé Mário
- Stadium: Kashima Soccer Stadium
- J.League: Champions
- Emperor's Cup: Semifinals
- J.League Cup: Semifinals
- Top goalscorer: Atsushi Yanagisawa (22)
| Home colours | Away colours |

1998 Kashima Antlers season

== Competitions ==
| Competitions | Position |
|---|---|
| J.League | Champions / 18 clubs |
| Emperor's Cup | Semifinals |
| J.League Cup | Semifinals |

== Domestic results ==
=== J.League ===
| 21 March 1998 1-1 | Kashima Antlers | 4-2 | Avispa Fukuoka | Kashima Soccer Stadium |
| JST (UTC+09) |

| 25 March 1998 1-2 | Consadole Sapporo | 1-3 | Kashima Antlers | Sendai Stadium |
| JST (UTC+09) |

| 28 March 1998 1-3 | Kashima Antlers | 3-2 | Shimizu S-Pulse | Kashima Soccer Stadium |
| JST (UTC+09) |

| 4 April 1998 1-4 | Kashima Antlers | 6-0 | Kyoto Purple Sanga | Kashima Soccer Stadium |
| JST (UTC+09) |

| 11 April 1998 1-5 | Kashiwa Reysol | 3-2 | Kashima Antlers | Tokyo National Stadium |
| JST (UTC+09) |

| 15 April 1998 1-6 | Kashima Antlers | 1-0 | Gamba Osaka | Kashima Soccer Stadium |
| JST (UTC+09) |

| 18 April 1998 1-7 | Yokohama Marinos | 1-0 | Kashima Antlers | International Stadium Yokohama |
| JST (UTC+09) |

| 25 April 1998 1-8 | Kashima Antlers | 1-4 | Urawa Red Diamonds | Kashima Soccer Stadium |
| JST (UTC+09) |

| 29 April 1998 1-9 | Nagoya Grampus Eight | 3-0 | Kashima Antlers | Mizuho Athletic Stadium |
| JST (UTC+09) |

| 2 May 1998 1-10 | Kashima Antlers | 1-0 | Bellmare Hiratsuka | Kashima Soccer Stadium |
| JST (UTC+09) |

| 5 May 1998 1-11 | Júbilo Iwata | 0-3 | Kashima Antlers | Júbilo Iwata Stadium |
| JST (UTC+09) |

| 9 May 1998 1-12 | Kashima Antlers | 3-1 | Verdy Kawasaki | Kashima Soccer Stadium |
| JST (UTC+09) |

| 25 July 1998 1-13 | Vissel Kobe | 2-3 | Kashima Antlers | Kobe Universiade Memorial Stadium |
| JST (UTC+09) |

| 29 July 1998 1-14 | Kashima Antlers | 4-1 | JEF United Ichihara | Kashima Soccer Stadium |
| JST (UTC+09) |

| 1 August 1998 1-15 | Yokohama Flügels | 3-2 | Kashima Antlers | International Stadium Yokohama |
| JST (UTC+09) |

| 5 August 1998 1-16 | Kashima Antlers | 3-2 (GG) (a.e.t.) | Cerezo Osaka | Kashima Soccer Stadium |
| JST (UTC+09) |

| 8 August 1998 1-17 | Sanfrecce Hiroshima | 3-2 | Kashima Antlers | Hiroshima Stadium |
| JST (UTC+09) |

| 22 August 1998 2-1 | JEF United Ichihara | 1-3 | Kashima Antlers | Ichihara Seaside Stadium |
| JST (UTC+09) |

| 29 August 1998 2-2 | Kashima Antlers | 1-3 | Yokohama Flügels | Kashima Soccer Stadium |
| JST (UTC+09) |

| 5 September 1998 2-3 | Cerezo Osaka | 0-2 | Kashima Antlers | Osaka Nagai Stadium |
| JST (UTC+09) |

| 12 September 1998 2-4 | Kashima Antlers | 0-2 | Sanfrecce Hiroshima | Kashima Soccer Stadium |
| JST (UTC+09) |

| 15 September 1998 2-5 | Avispa Fukuoka | 0-3 | Kashima Antlers | Hakatanomori Football Stadium |
| JST (UTC+09) |

| 19 September 1998 2-6 | Kashima Antlers | 3-2 | Consadole Sapporo | Kashima Soccer Stadium |
| JST (UTC+09) |

| 23 September 1998 2-7 | Shimizu S-Pulse | 1-2 | Kashima Antlers | Nihondaira Sports Stadium |
| JST (UTC+09) |

| 26 September 1998 2-8 | Kyoto Purple Sanga | 0-3 | Kashima Antlers | Nishikyogoku Athletic Stadium |
| JST (UTC+09) |

| 3 October 1998 2-9 | Kashima Antlers | 3-0 | Kashiwa Reysol | Kashima Soccer Stadium |
| JST (UTC+09) |

| 14 October 1998 2-10 | Gamba Osaka | 1-3 | Kashima Antlers | Osaka Expo '70 Stadium |
| JST (UTC+09) |

| 17 October 1998 2-11 | Kashima Antlers | 2-1 (GG) (a.e.t.) | Yokohama Marinos | Kashima Soccer Stadium |
| JST (UTC+09) |

| 21 October 1998 2-12 | Urawa Red Diamonds | 2-3 (GG) (a.e.t.) | Kashima Antlers | Tokyo National Stadium |
| JST (UTC+09) |

| 24 October 1998 2-13 | Kashima Antlers | 1-0 | Nagoya Grampus Eight | Kashima Soccer Stadium |
| JST (UTC+09) |

| 31 October 1998 2-14 | Bellmare Hiratsuka | 0-2 | Kashima Antlers | Hiratsuka Athletics Stadium |
| JST (UTC+09) |

| 3 November 1998 2-15 | Kashima Antlers | 1-0 | Júbilo Iwata | Kashima Soccer Stadium |
| JST (UTC+09) |

| 7 November 1998 2-16 | Verdy Kawasaki | 1-2 (GG) (a.e.t.) | Kashima Antlers | Todoroki Athletics Stadium |
| JST (UTC+09) |

| 14 November 1998 2-17 | Kashima Antlers | 4-1 | Vissel Kobe | Kashima Soccer Stadium |
| JST (UTC+09) |

=== Emperor's Cup ===
| 1st Round | bye |

| 2nd Round | bye |

| 13 December 1998 3rd Round | Kashima Antlers | 3-1 | University of Tsukuba | Kasamatsu Stadium |
| JST (UTC+09) |

| 20 December 1998 4th Round | Kashima Antlers | 3-0 | Bellmare Hiratsuka | Nagasaki Athletic Stadium |
| JST (UTC+09) |

| 23 December 1998 Quarterfinals | Kashima Antlers | 2-1 (GG) (a.e.t.) | Sanfrecce Hiroshima | Sendai Stadium |
| JST (UTC+09) |

| 27 December 1998 Semifinals | Yokohama Flügels | 1-0 | Kashima Antlers | Osaka Nagai Stadium |
| JST (UTC+09) |

=== J.League Cup ===
| 16 May 1998 GL-B-1 | Kashima Antlers | 3-0 | Avispa Fukuoka | Kashima Soccer Stadium |
| JST (UTC+09) |

| GL-B-2 | bye |

| 30 May 1998 GL-B-3 | Kashiwa Reysol | 1-1 | Kashima Antlers | Hitachi Kashiwa Soccer Stadium |
| JST (UTC+09) |

| 3 June 1998 GL-B-4 | Yokohama Marinos | 1-2 | Kashima Antlers | Yokohama Mitsuzawa Stadium |
| JST (UTC+09) |

| 6 June 1998 GL-B-5 | Kashima Antlers | 5-2 | Cerezo Osaka | Kashima Soccer Stadium |
| JST (UTC+09) |

| 15 July 1998 Semifinals | JEF United Ichihara | 3-2 | Kashima Antlers | Ichihara Seaside Stadium |
| JST (UTC+09) |

== Player statistics ==
| No. | Pos. | Nat. | Player | D.o.B. (Age) | Height / Weight | J.League | | Emperor's Cup | | J.League Cup | | Total | |
| No. | Pos. | Nat. | Player | D.o.B. (Age) | Height / Weight | Apps | Goals | Apps | Goals | Apps | Goals | Apps | Goals |
|---|---|---|---|---|---|---|---|---|---|---|---|---|---|
| 1 | GK | (Japan) | Masaaki Furukawa | August 28, 1968 (aged 29) | cm / kg | 9 | 0 | | | | | | |
| 2 | MF | (Brazil) | Jorginho | August 17, 1964 (aged 33) | cm / kg | 17 | 2 | | | | | | |
| 3 | DF | (Japan) | Yutaka Akita | August 6, 1970 (aged 27) | cm / kg | 32 | 3 | | | | | | |
| 4 | DF | (Japan) | Ryosuke Okuno | November 13, 1968 (aged 29) | cm / kg | 29 | 0 | | | | | | |
| 5 | DF | (Japan) | Naruyuki Naito | November 9, 1967 (aged 30) | cm / kg | 28 | 1 | | | | | | |
| 6 | MF | (Japan) | Yasuto Honda | June 25, 1969 (aged 28) | cm / kg | 21 | 0 | | | | | | |
| 7 | DF | (Japan) | Naoki Soma | July 19, 1971 (aged 26) | cm / kg | 34 | 1 | | | | | | |
| 8 | FW | (Brazil) | Mazinho Oliveira | December 26, 1965 (aged 32) | cm / kg | 24 | 9 | | | | | | |
| 9 | FW | (Japan) | Takayuki Suzuki | June 5, 1976 (aged 21) | cm / kg | 3 | 1 | | | | | | |
| 10 | MF | (Brazil) | Bismarck | September 17, 1969 (aged 28) | cm / kg | 30 | 6 | | | | | | |
| 11 | FW | (Japan) | Yoshiyuki Hasegawa | February 11, 1969 (aged 29) | cm / kg | 26 | 14 | | | | | | |
| 13 | FW | (Japan) | Atsushi Yanagisawa | May 27, 1977 (aged 20) | cm / kg | 32 | 22 | | | | | | |
| 14 | MF | (Japan) | Tadatoshi Masuda | December 25, 1973 (aged 24) | cm / kg | 16 | 4 | | | | | | |
| 15 | DF | (Japan) | Ichiei Muroi | June 22, 1974 (aged 23) | cm / kg | 8 | 0 | | | | | | |
| 16 | MF | (Japan) | Toshiyuki Abe | August 1, 1974 (aged 23) | cm / kg | 23 | 1 | | | | | | |
| 17 | DF | (Japan) | Masafumi Mizuki | August 1, 1974 (aged 23) | cm / kg | 6 | 0 | | | | | | |
| 18 | MF | (Japan) | Koji Kumagai | October 23, 1975 (aged 22) | cm / kg | 4 | 2 | | | | | | |
| 20 | DF | (Japan) | Tomohiko Ikeuchi | November 1, 1977 (aged 20) | cm / kg | 0 | 0 | | | | | | |
| 21 | GK | (Japan) | Yohei Sato | November 22, 1972 (aged 25) | cm / kg | 2 | 0 | | | | | | |
| 22 | DF | (Japan) | Akira Narahashi | November 26, 1971 (aged 26) | cm / kg | 33 | 5 | | | | | | |
| 23 | MF | (Japan) | Takeshi Yamaguchi | June 10, 1979 (aged 18) | cm / kg | 0 | 0 | | | | | | |
| 24 | MF | (Japan) | Masashi Motoyama | June 20, 1979 (aged 18) | cm / kg | 1 | 0 | | | | | | |
| 25 | DF | (Japan) | Yoshiro Nakamura | October 17, 1979 (aged 18) | cm / kg | 0 | 0 | | | | | | |
| 26 | MF | (Japan) | Kōji Nakata | July 9, 1979 (aged 18) | cm / kg | 5 | 1 | | | | | | |
| 27 | MF | (Japan) | Mitsuo Ogasawara | April 5, 1979 (aged 18) | cm / kg | 5 | 0 | | | | | | |
| 28 | GK | (Japan) | Daijiro Takakuwa | August 10, 1973 (aged 24) | cm / kg | 24 | 0 | | | | | | |
| 29 | GK | (Japan) | Hitoshi Sogahata | August 2, 1979 (aged 18) | cm / kg | 0 | 0 | | | | | | |
| 30 | FW | (Japan) | Yasuo Manaka | January 31, 1971 (aged 27) | cm / kg | 21 | 6 | | | | | | |
| 31 | DF | (Brazil) | Ricardo | February 23, 1977 (aged 21) | cm / kg | 0 | 0 | | | | | | |

== Other pages ==
- (in Japanese) J.League official site
