= Yasuo Manaka =

Japanese footballer

Yasuo Manaka 眞中 靖夫
Personal information
- Full name: Yasuo Manaka
- Date of birth: January 31, 1971 (age 55)
- Place of birth: Bando, Ibaraki, Japan
- Height: 1.70 m (5 ft 7 in)
- Position: Forward

Youth career
- 1986–1988: Iwai Nishi High School

Senior career*
Years	Team	Apps	(Gls)
1989–1998	Kashima Antlers	135	(33)
1999–2003	Cerezo Osaka	106	(26)
2003–2004	Sanfrecce Hiroshima	20	(2)
2004	Yokohama FC	13	(1)
Total		274	(62)

Managerial career
- 2017: Konomiya Speranza Osaka-Takatsuki
Medal record
Kashima Antlers
Winner	J1 League	1996
Winner	J1 League	1998
Runner-up	J1 League	1993
Runner-up	J1 League	1997
Winner	J.League Cup	1997
Winner	Emperor's Cup	1997
Runner-up	Emperor's Cup	1993
Cerezo Osaka
Runner-up	Emperor's Cup	2001
Runner-up	Emperor's Cup	2003
- * Club domestic league appearances and goals

Yasuo Manaka (眞中 靖夫, Manaka Yasuo; born January 31, 1971) is a former Japanese football player and manager. His elder brother Mikio Manaka is also a former footballer.

== Playing career ==
Manaka was born in Bando on January 31, 1971. After graduating from high school, he joined Japan Soccer League club Sumitomo Metal (later Kashima Antlers) in 1989. In 1992, Japan Soccer League was folded and founded new league J1 League. He played many matches as substitutes and the club won the champions 1996, 1998 J1 League, 1997 J.League Cup and 1997 Emperor's Cup. He moved to Cerezo Osaka in 1999. He also played as midfielder not only forward. He moved to Sanfrecce Hiroshima in August 2003 and Yokohama FC in July 2004. At Yokohama FC, he played with his elder brother Mikio Manaka. He retired end of 2004 season.

== Coaching career ==
After retirement, Manaka became a manager for L.League club Konomiya Speranza Osaka-Takatsuki in 2017. However he resigned in October 2017.

== Record ==
Manaka holds the record for the fastest J1 League hat-trick ever. On July 14, 2001, he scored three goals in three minutes for Cerezo Osaka against Kashiwa Reysol, the goals coming in the 72nd, 73rd and 75th minutes.

== Club statistics ==
Club performance			League		Cup		League Cup		Total	
Season	Club	League	Apps	Goals	Apps	Goals	Apps	Goals	Apps	Goals
Japan			League		Emperor's Cup		J.League Cup		Total	
1989/90	Sumitomo Metal	JSL Division 2	9	2			1	0	10	2
1990/91	Sumitomo Metal	JSL Division 2	8	1			1	0	9	1
1991/92	Sumitomo Metal	JSL Division 2	21	9			2	2	23	11
1992	Kashima Antlers	J1 League	-		1	0	0	0	1	0
1993	Kashima Antlers	J1 League	12	3	1	0	2	1	15	4
1994	Kashima Antlers	J1 League	8	0	1	0	0	0	9	0
1995	Kashima Antlers	J1 League	23	3	3	0	-		26	3
1996	Kashima Antlers	J1 League	21	5	3	0	4	0	28	5
1997	Kashima Antlers	J1 League	12	4	0	0	4	0	16	4
1998	Kashima Antlers	J1 League	21	6	2	0	5	1	28	7
1999	Cerezo Osaka	J1 League	27	5	2	0	4	0	33	5
2000	Cerezo Osaka	J1 League	17	2	3	0	4	0	24	2
2001	Cerezo Osaka	J1 League	24	5	3	0	2	2	29	7
2002	Cerezo Osaka	J2 League	28	13	3	0	-		31	13
2003	Cerezo Osaka	J1 League	10	1	0	0	2	0	12	1
2003	Sanfrecce Hiroshima	J2 League	14	2	3	1	-		17	3
2004	Sanfrecce Hiroshima	J1 League	6	0	0	0	1	0	7	0
2004	Yokohama FC	J2 League	13	1	1	0	-		14	1
Total			274	62	26	1	32	6	332	69
