= Yohei Sato =

Japanese footballer

Yohei Sato 佐藤 洋平
Personal information
- Full name: Yohei Sato
- Date of birth: 22 November 1972 (age 53)
- Place of birth: Sendai, Miyagi, Japan
- Height: 1.87 m (6 ft 1 1/2 in)
- Position: Goalkeeper

Youth career
- 1988–1990: Miyagi Technical High School

Senior career*
Years	Team	Apps	(Gls)
1991–1998	Kashima Antlers	76	(0)
1999–2003	Consadole Sapporo	135	(0)
2003–2008	Júbilo Iwata	32	(0)
Total		243	(0)
Medal record
Kashima Antlers
Winner	J1 League	1996
Winner	J1 League	1998
Runner-up	J1 League	1993
Runner-up	J1 League	1997
Winner	J.League Cup	1997
Winner	Emperor's Cup	1997
Runner-up	Emperor's Cup	1993
Júbilo Iwata
Runner-up	J1 League	2003
Winner	Emperor's Cup	2003
Runner-up	Emperor's Cup	2004
- * Club domestic league appearances and goals

Yohei Sato (佐藤 洋平, Satō Yōhei; born 22 November 1972) is a former Japanese football player.

== Playing career ==
Sato was born in Sendai on 22 November 1972. After graduating from high school, he joined Sumitomo Metal (later Kashima Antlers) in 1991. Although he played many matches in first season, he could hardly play in the match behind Masaaki Furukawa from 1992. His opportunity to play decreased from 1995, the club won the champions 1996 J1 League. In 1997, he became a regular goalkeeper and the club won the champions J.League Cup and Emperor's Cup. However he could not play in the match behind Daijiro Takakuwa in 1998. He moved to J2 League club Consadole Sapporo. He played as regular goalkeeper, and the club won the champions in 2000 and was promoted to J1 League. However the club was relegated to J2 end of 2002 season and his opportunity to play decreased behind Yosuke Fujigaya in 2003. In September 2003, he moved to Júbilo Iwata. Although he had no opportunity to play in league competition, at 2003 Emperor's Cup, he played all matches and won the champions. He played as regular player in 2004. However the club got Japan national team goalkeeper Yoshikatsu Kawaguchi in 2005 and Sato could hardly play in the match from 2005. He announced his retirement in November 2007. However he came back as player until June 2008 because reserve goalkeeper got hurt.

== Club statistics ==
Club performance			League		Cup		League Cup		Continental		Total	
Season	Club	League	Apps	Goals	Apps	Goals	Apps	Goals	Apps	Goals	Apps	Goals
Japan			League		Emperor's Cup		J.League Cup		Asia		Total	
1991/92	Sumitomo Metal	JSL Division 1	15	0			0	0	-		15	0
1992	Kashima Antlers	J1 League	-		0	0	0	0	-		0	0
1993	Kashima Antlers	J1 League	0	0	0	0	0	0	-		0	0
1994	Kashima Antlers	J1 League	5	0	0	0	0	0	-		5	0
1995	Kashima Antlers	J1 League	26	0	4	0	-		-		30	0
1996	Kashima Antlers	J1 League	15	0	0	0	10	0	-		25	0
1997	Kashima Antlers	J1 League	28	0	5	0	6	0	-		39	0
1998	Kashima Antlers	J1 League	2	0	1	0	0	0	-		3	0
1999	Consadole Sapporo	J2 League	35	0	3	0	2	0	-		40	0
2000	Consadole Sapporo	J2 League	37	0	3	0	2	0	-		42	0
2001	Consadole Sapporo	J1 League	29	0	0	0	2	0	-		31	0
2002	Consadole Sapporo	J1 League	27	0	1	0	6	0	-		34	0
2003	Consadole Sapporo	J2 League	7	0	0	0	-		-		7	0
2003	Júbilo Iwata	J1 League	0	0	5	0	0	0	-		5	0
2004	Júbilo Iwata	J1 League	23	0	2	0	5	0	5	0	35	0
2005	Júbilo Iwata	J1 League	6	0	0	0	1	0	5	0	12	0
2006	Júbilo Iwata	J1 League	1	0	2	0	1	0	-		4	0
2007	Júbilo Iwata	J1 League	2	0	0	0	1	0	-		3	0
2008	Júbilo Iwata	J1 League	0	0	0	0	0	0	-		0	0
Total			268	0	26	0	36	0	10	0	330	0
