= Yoshiyuki Hasegawa =

Japanese footballer

Yoshiyuki Hasegawa 長谷川 祥之
Personal information
- Full name: Yoshiyuki Hasegawa
- Date of birth: 11 February 1969 (age 57)
- Place of birth: Uji, Japan
- Height: 1.79 m (5 ft 10 1/2 in)
- Position: Forward

Youth career
- 1984–1986: Uji High School
- 1987–1990: Osaka University of Economics

Senior career*
Years	Team	Apps	(Gls)
1991–1992	Honda	22	(3)
1992–2003	Kashima Antlers	261	(89)
Total		283	(92)

International career
1995–1996	Japan	6	(0)
Medal record
Honda
Runner-up	JSL Cup	1991
Kashima Antlers
Winner	J1 League	1996
Winner	J1 League	1998
Winner	J1 League	2000
Winner	J1 League	2001
Runner-up	J1 League	1993
Runner-up	J1 League	1997
Winner	J.League Cup	1997
Winner	J.League Cup	2000
Winner	J.League Cup	2002
Runner-up	J.League Cup	1999
Runner-up	J.League Cup	2003
Winner	Emperor's Cup	1997
Winner	Emperor's Cup	2000
Runner-up	Emperor's Cup	1993
Runner-up	Emperor's Cup	2002
- * Club domestic league appearances and goals

Yoshiyuki Hasegawa (長谷川 祥之, Hasegawa Yoshiyuki; born 11 February 1969) is a former Japanese football player. He played for Japan national team.

== Club career ==
Hasegawa was born in Uji on 11 February 1969. After graduating from Osaka University of Economics, he joined Japan Soccer League club Honda in 1991. In 1992, he moved to J1 League club Kashima Antlers. He mainly played as regular player in 1990s. In 2000, the club won all three major title in Japan; J1 League, J.League Cup and Emperor's Cup first time in J.League history. The club won the champions J1 League 4 times, J.League Cup 3 times and Emperor's Cup 2 times. He retired in July 2003.

== National team career ==
On 15 February 1995, Hasegawa debuted for Japan national team against Australia. He was also selected Japan in 1996. He played 6 games for Japan until 1996.

== Club statistics ==
Club performance			League		Cup		League Cup		Continental		Total	
Season	Club	League	Apps	Goals	Apps	Goals	Apps	Goals	Apps	Goals	Apps	Goals
Japan			League		Emperor's Cup		J.League Cup		Asia		Total	
1990/91	Honda	JSL Division 1	0	0	0	0	0	0	-		0	0
1991/92	Honda	JSL Division 1	22	3			3	0	-		25	3
1992	Kashima Antlers	J1 League	-		3	1	9	7	-		12	8
1993	Kashima Antlers	J1 League	30	9	5	4	5	3	-		40	16
1994	Kashima Antlers	J1 League	43	21	1	0	0	0	-		44	21
1995	Kashima Antlers	J1 League	42	16	4	2	-		-		46	18
1996	Kashima Antlers	J1 League	25	12	3	0	11	0	-		39	12
1997	Kashima Antlers	J1 League	27	7	2	1	11	4	-		40	12
1998	Kashima Antlers	J1 League	26	14	4	0	4	3	-		34	17
1999	Kashima Antlers	J1 League	21	4	0	0	7	2	-		28	6
2000	Kashima Antlers	J1 League	8	1	1	0	5	0	-		14	1
2001	Kashima Antlers	J1 League	11	2	1	0	6	1	-		18	3
2002	Kashima Antlers	J1 League	25	3	3	0	8	3	-		36	6
2003	Kashima Antlers	J1 League	3	0	0	0	0	0	1	0	4	0
Total			283	92	27	8	69	23	1	0	380	123

== National team statistics ==
Japan national team
Year	Apps	Goals
1995	4	0
1996	2	0
Total	6	0
