= Yasuto Honda =

Japanese footballer (born 1969)

Yasuto Honda 本田 泰人
Personal information
- Full name: Yasuto Honda
- Date of birth: June 25, 1969 (age 57)
- Place of birth: Kitakyushu, Fukuoka, Japan
- Height: 1.66 m (5 ft 5 1/2 in)
- Position: Midfielder

Youth career
- 1985–1987: Teikyo High School

Senior career*
Years	Team	Apps	(Gls)
1988–1992	Honda	72	(2)
1992–2006	Kashima Antlers	328	(4)
Total		400	(6)

International career
1995–1997	Japan	29	(1)
Medal record
Honda
Runner-up	JSL Cup	1991
Kashima Antlers
Winner	J1 League	1996
Winner	J1 League	1998
Winner	J1 League	2000
Winner	J1 League	2001
Runner-up	J1 League	1993
Runner-up	J1 League	1997
Winner	J.League Cup	1997
Winner	J.League Cup	2000
Winner	J.League Cup	2002
Runner-up	J.League Cup	1999
Runner-up	J.League Cup	2003
Runner-up	J.League Cup	2006
Winner	Emperor's Cup	1997
Winner	Emperor's Cup	2000
Runner-up	Emperor's Cup	1993
Runner-up	Emperor's Cup	2002
- * Club domestic league appearances and goals

Yasuto Honda (本田 泰人, Honda Yasuto; born June 25, 1969) is a former Japanese football player. He played for Japan national team.

== Club career ==
Honda was born in Kitakyushu on June 25, 1969. After graduating from high school, he joined Japan Soccer League club Honda in 1988. In 1992, he moved to J1 League club Kashima Antlers. The club won the champions at J1 League 4 times, J.League Cup 3 times and Emperor's Cup 2 times. He retired end of 2006 season. He played 400 games and scored 6 goals in the league at both clubs.

== National team career ==
On October 24, 1995, Honda debuted for Japan national team against Saudi Arabia. In 1996, he played in all matches including 1996 Asian Cup. In 1997, although he played at 1998 World Cup qualification, his opportunity to play decreased in the latter half. He played 29 games and scored 1 goal for Japan until 1997.

== Club statistics ==
Club performance			League		Cup		League Cup		Continental		Total	
Season	Club	League	Apps	Goals	Apps	Goals	Apps	Goals	Apps	Goals	Apps	Goals
Japan			League		Emperor's Cup		J.League Cup		Asia		Total	
1988/89	Honda	JSL Division 1	9	0							9	0
1989/90	Honda	JSL Division 1	22	1			2	3	-		24	4
1990/91	Honda	JSL Division 1	21	1			4	1	-		25	2
1991/92	Honda	JSL Division 1	20	0			3	0	-		23	0
1992	Kashima Antlers	J1 League	-		3	0	10	0	-		13	0
1993	Kashima Antlers	J1 League	35	0	5	0	6	0	-		46	0
1994	Kashima Antlers	J1 League	43	0	1	0	1	0	-		45	0
1995	Kashima Antlers	J1 League	49	3	4	0	-		-		53	3
1996	Kashima Antlers	J1 League	29	0	3	0	13	0	-		45	0
1997	Kashima Antlers	J1 League	21	0	5	0	2	0	-		28	0
1998	Kashima Antlers	J1 League	21	0	4	1	5	0	-		30	1
1999	Kashima Antlers	J1 League	17	0	0	0	4	0	-		21	0
2000	Kashima Antlers	J1 League	29	0	5	0	5	0	-		39	0
2001	Kashima Antlers	J1 League	24	0	1	0	6	0	-		31	0
2002	Kashima Antlers	J1 League	22	0	4	0	9	1	-		35	1
2003	Kashima Antlers	J1 League	19	0	4	0	5	0	1	0	29	0
2004	Kashima Antlers	J1 League	7	0	0	0	5	0	-		12	0
2005	Kashima Antlers	J1 League	4	1	1	0	1	0	-		6	1
2006	Kashima Antlers	J1 League	8	0	1	0	3	1	-		12	1
Total			400	6	41	1	84	6	1	0	526	13

== National team statistics ==
- 1996 Asian Cup

Japan national team
Year	Apps	Goals
1995	2	0
1996	13	0
1997	14	1
Total	29	1

== SASUKE ==
Honda competed in SASUKE 26, where he failed the second obstacle, the Hazard Swing.
