= Takeshi Yamaguchi =

Japanese footballer

Takeshi Yamaguchi 山口 武士
Personal information
- Full name: Takeshi Yamaguchi
- Date of birth: June 10, 1979 (age 47)
- Place of birth: Kumamoto, Japan
- Height: 1.74 m (5 ft 8 1/2 in)
- Position: Midfielder

Youth career
- 1995–1997: Ozu High School

Senior career*
Years	Team	Apps	(Gls)
1998–2001	Kashima Antlers	0	(0)
2000	→Oita Trinita (loan)	0	(0)
2002–2004	Sony Sendai	58	(3)
2005–2009	Roasso Kumamoto	79	(8)
Total		137	(11)
Medal record
Kashima Antlers
Winner	J1 League	1998
Winner	J1 League	2001
Runner-up	J.League Cup	1999
- * Club domestic league appearances and goals

Takeshi Yamaguchi (山口 武士, Yamaguchi Takeshi; born June 10, 1979) is a former Japanese football player.

== Playing career ==
Yamaguchi was born in Kumamoto on June 10, 1979. After graduating from high school, he joined J1 League club Kashima Antlers in 1998. However he could not play at all in the match until 2001. Although he also played for J2 League club Oita Trinita in 2000, he could not play at all in the match. In 2002, he moved to Japan Football League (JFL) club Sony Sendai. He played many matches in 3 seasons. In 2005, he moved to his local club Rosso Kumamoto (later Roasso Kumamoto) in Regional Leagues. He played as regular player and the club was promoted to JFL from 2006. In 2007, the club won the 2nd place and was promoted to J2 from 2008. However his opportunity to play decreased from 2008 and retired end of 2009 season.

== Club statistics ==
Club performance			League		Cup		League Cup		Total	
Season	Club	League	Apps	Goals	Apps	Goals	Apps	Goals	Apps	Goals
Japan			League		Emperor's Cup		J.League Cup		Total	
1998	Kashima Antlers	J1 League	0	0	0	0	0	0	0	0
1999	Kashima Antlers	J1 League	0	0	0	0	0	0	0	0
2000	Oita Trinita	J2 League	0	0	0	0	0	0	0	0
2001	Kashima Antlers	J1 League	0	0	0	0	0	0	0	0
2002	Sony Sendai	Football League	16	3	1	0	-		17	3
2003	Sony Sendai	Football League	18	0	0	0	-		18	0
2004	Sony Sendai	Football League	24	0	0	0	-		24	0
2005	Rosso Kumamoto	Regional Leagues	17	4	1	0	-		18	4
2006	Rosso Kumamoto	Football League	22	0	3	0	-		25	0
2007	Rosso Kumamoto	Football League	20	2	0	0	-		20	2
2008	Roasso Kumamoto	J2 League	18	1	0	0	-		18	1
2009	Roasso Kumamoto	J2 League	2	1	0	0	-		2	1
Total			137	11	5	0	0	0	142	11
