= Naruyuki Naito =

Japanese footballer

Naruyuki Naito 内藤 就行
Personal information
- Full name: Naruyuki Naito
- Date of birth: November 9, 1967 (age 58)
- Place of birth: Nara, Nara, Japan
- Height: 1.78 m (5 ft 10 in)
- Position: Defender

Youth career
- 1983–1985: Oyodo High School
- 1986–1989: Chukyo University

Senior career*
Years	Team	Apps	(Gls)
1990–1992	Honda	30	(3)
1992–1999	Kashima Antlers	148	(3)
2000–2001	FC Tokyo	38	(1)
2001–2002	Avispa Fukuoka	37	(1)
2003	Volca Kagoshima		
Total		253	(8)

Managerial career
- 2016: Ange Violet Hiroshima
- 2017: Kobe International University
- 2018–2019: Blancdieu Hirosaki FC
- 2020: Porvenir Kashihara
- 2021: Tegevajaro Miyazaki
Medal record
Honda
Runner-up	JSL Cup	1991
Kashima Antlers
Winner	J1 League	1996
Winner	J1 League	1998
Runner-up	J1 League	1993
Runner-up	J1 League	1997
Winner	J.League Cup	1997
Runner-up	J.League Cup	1999
Winner	Emperor's Cup	1997
Runner-up	Emperor's Cup	1993
- * Club domestic league appearances and goals

Naruyuki Naito (内藤 就行, Naito Naruyuki; born November 9, 1967) is a Japanese football coach and former player.

== Playing career ==
Naito was born in Nara on November 9, 1967. After graduating from Chukyo University, he joined Honda in 1990. He played many matches as forward and the club won the 2nd place 1991 JSL Cup. He moved to Kashima Antlers in 1992. However he could not play many matches behind Alcindo, Hisashi Kurosaki and Yoshiyuki Hasegawa. In 1995, he was converted to right side-back and became a regular player and the club won the champions 1996 J1 League. In 1997, his opportunity to play decreased behind Akira Narahashi who came to Antlers in 1997. In 1998, he was converted to defensive midfielder and played many matches at the position with Jorginho or Yasuto Honda and the club won the champions J1 League. In 2000, he moved to newly was promoted to J1 League club, FC Tokyo. In 2000 season, he played as regular player as right side back. However his opportunity to play decreased in 2001 and he moved to Avispa Fukuoka in August 2001. He left the club for generational change end of 2002 season. In 2003, he moved to Regional Leagues club Volca Kagoshima and retired end of 2003 season.

== Coaching career ==
After a few years between women's and university's teams, Naito was hired to coach Tegevajaro Miyazaki in 2021 for their first-ever pro-season. In 2021, Tegevajaro ended up third in the table and Naito had a successful season, before leaving the spot to Yasushi Takasaki.

== Club statistics ==
Updated to January 1st, 2022.

Club performance			League		Cup		League Cup		Total	
Season	Club	League	Apps	Goals	Apps	Goals	Apps	Goals	Apps	Goals
Japan			League		Emperor's Cup		J.League Cup		Total	
1990/91	Honda	JSL Division 1	9	1			3	1	12	2
1991/92	Honda	JSL Division 1	21	2			4	0	25	2
1992	Kashima Antlers	J1 League	-		2	1	6	0	8	1
1993	Kashima Antlers	J1 League	4	0	0	0	0	0	4	0
1994	Kashima Antlers	J1 League	15	1	1	0	0	0	16	1
1995	Kashima Antlers	J1 League	32	0	4	1	-		36	1
1996	Kashima Antlers	J1 League	30	1	3	0	9	0	42	1
1997	Kashima Antlers	J1 League	20	0	1	0	11	0	32	0
1998	Kashima Antlers	J1 League	28	1	4	0	5	1	37	2
1999	Kashima Antlers	J1 League	19	0	0	0	3	0	22	0
2000	FC Tokyo	J1 League	27	1	1	0	2	0	30	1
2001	FC Tokyo	J1 League	11	0	0	0	2	0	13	0
2001	Avispa Fukuoka	J1 League	10	0	0	0	0	0	10	0
2002	Avispa Fukuoka	J2 League	27	1	0	0	-		27	1
2003	Volca Kagoshima	JRL (Kyushu)			1	0	-		1	0
Total			253	8	17	2	45	2	315	12
