= Daijiro Takakuwa =

Japanese footballer (born 1973)

Daijiro Takakuwa 高桑 大二朗
Personal information
- Date of birth: August 10, 1973 (age 53)
- Place of birth: Tokyo, Japan
- Height: 1.90 m (6 ft 3 in)
- Position: Goalkeeper

Youth career
- 1989–1991: Nihon University High School

Senior career*
Years	Team	Apps	(Gls)
1992–1996	Yokohama Marinos	0	(0)
1996–2001	Kashima Antlers	89	(0)
2002	Tokyo Verdy	12	(0)
2003–2006	Vegalta Sendai	123	(0)
2007–2008	Yokohama F. Marinos	1	(0)
2009	Tokushima Vortis	0	(0)
Total		225	(0)

International career
2000	Japan	1	(0)
Medal record
Yokohama F. Marinos
Winner	J1 League	1995
Winner	Emperor's Cup	1992
Kashima Antlers
Winner	J1 League	1996
Winner	J1 League	1998
Winner	J1 League	2000
Winner	J1 League	2001
Runner-up	J1 League	1997
Winner	J.League Cup	1997
Winner	J.League Cup	2000
Runner-up	J.League Cup	1999
Winner	Emperor's Cup	1997
Winner	Emperor's Cup	2000
Representing Japan
AFC Asian Cup
Gold medal – first place	2000 Lebanon
- * Club domestic league appearances and goals

Daijiro Takakuwa (高桑 大二朗, Takakuwa Daijirō; born August 10, 1973) is a Japanese former football player. He played for the Japan national team.

== Club career ==
Takakuwa was born in Tokyo on August 10, 1973. After graduating from high school, he joined Yokohama Marinos (later Yokohama F. Marinos) in 1992. However he could not play in the match behind Japan national team goalkeeper, Shigetatsu Matsunaga and Yoshikatsu Kawaguchi. He moved to Kashima Antlers in 1996. In 1998, he became a regular goalkeeper and won the champions in J1 League. In Asia, the club won 1998–99 Asian Cup Winners' Cup. In 2000, the club won all three major title in Japan; J1 League, J.League Cup and Emperor's Cup. He also was selected Best Eleven. In 2001, his opportunity to play decreased behind Hitoshi Sogahata. He moved to Tokyo Verdy in 2002 and Vegalta Sendai in 2003. At Vegalta Sendai, he played as regular goalkeeper from 2004 to July 2006. In 2007, he returned to Yokohama F. Marinos for the first time in 11 years. However he could hardly play in the match. He moved to Tokushima Vortis in 2009 and retired end of 2009 season.

== National team career ==
In October 2000, Takakuwa was selected Japan national team for 2000 Asian Cup. At this competition, on October 20, he debuted against Qatar. Although he played only one match, Japan won the champions.

== Club statistics ==
Club performance			League		Cup		League Cup		Total	
Season	Club	League	Apps	Goals	Apps	Goals	Apps	Goals	Apps	Goals
Japan			League		Emperor's Cup		J.League Cup		Total	
1992	Yokohama Marinos	J1 League	-		0	0	0	0	0	0
1993	Yokohama Marinos	J1 League	0	0	0	0	0	0	0	0
1994	Yokohama Marinos	J1 League	0	0	0	0	0	0	0	0
1995	Yokohama Marinos	J1 League	0	0	0	0	-		0	0
1996	Yokohama Marinos	J1 League	0	0	0	0	0	0	0	0
1996	Kashima Antlers	J1 League	0	0	0	0	0	0	0	0
1997	Kashima Antlers	J1 League	0	0	0	0	0	0	0	0
1998	Kashima Antlers	J1 League	24	0	3	0	5	0	32	0
1999	Kashima Antlers	J1 League	26	0	2	0	7	0	35	0
2000	Kashima Antlers	J1 League	30	0	4	0	4	0	38	0
2001	Kashima Antlers	J1 League	9	0	1	0	0	0	10	0
2002	Tokyo Verdy	J1 League	12	0	0	0	5	0	17	0
2003	Vegalta Sendai	J1 League	11	0	1	0	5	0	17	0
2004	Vegalta Sendai	J2 League	44	0	2	0	-		46	0
2005	Vegalta Sendai	J2 League	43	0	0	0	-		43	0
2006	Vegalta Sendai	J2 League	25	0	0	0	-		25	0
2007	Yokohama F. Marinos	J1 League	1	0	0	0	1	0	2	0
2008	Yokohama F. Marinos	J1 League	0	0	0	0	0	0	0	0
2009	Tokushima Vortis	J2 League	0	0	1	0	-		1	0
Total			225	0	14	0	27	0	266	0

== National team statistics ==
Japan national team
Year	Apps	Goals
2000	1	0
Total	1	0

== National team ==
- 2000 Asian Cup (champions)

== Honors and awards ==
=== Individual Honors ===
- J1 League Best Eleven: 2000

=== Team Honors ===
- AFC Asian Cup Champions: 2000
- J - League: 1998, 2000
- J - League Cup: 2000
- Emperor's Cup: 2000
- Japanese Super Cup: 1999, 2000
