= 1992 Kashima Antlers season =

Kashima Antlers
1992 season
- Chairman: 間中竣
- Manager: Masakatsu Miyamoto
- Stadium: Kashima Soccer Stadium (under construction)
- Emperor's Cup: Quarterfinals
- J.League Cup: Semifinals
- Top goalscorer: League: All: Hisashi Kurosaki (9)

1992 Kashima Antlers season

== Team name ==
Club name
Kashima Antlers FC
Nickname
Antlers

== Competitions ==
Competitions	Position
Emperor's Cup	Quarterfinals
J.League Cup	Semifinals

== Domestic results ==
=== Emperor's Cup ===
5 December 1992 1st Round	Nippon Steel Yawata	1–8	Kashima Antlers	Ehime Matsuyama Athletic Stadium
: JST (UTC+09:00)	Oi 72'		Hasegawa 19'; Yoshida 21'; Santos 25', 71'; Kurosaki 30', 44', 55'; Naitō 89'

6 December 1992 2nd Round	Yanmar Diesel	1–2	Kashima Antlers	Ehime Matsuyama Athletic Stadium
: JST (UTC+09:00)	Morishima 27'		Kurosaki 5'; Zico 12'

20 December 1992 Quarterfinals	Urawa Red Diamonds	2–1	Kashima Antlers	Himeji Athletic Stadium
13:05 JST (UTC+09:00)	Fukuda 59'; Hirose 62'		Kurosaki 76'	Attendance: 15,000; Referee: Yōtarō Moritsu

=== J.League Cup ===
5 September 1992 GL-1	Kashima Antlers	4–2	Yokohama Flügels	Kasamatsu Stadium
15:00 JST (UTC+09:00)	Irii 24'; Hasegawa 30', 51'; Milton 87'	J. League	Maeda 32'; Ōtake 79'	Attendance: 5,226; Referee: Kiichirō Tachi; Assistant referees: Yū Nakamura; Masato Nogami; Fourth official: Ryūichi Mogi

9 September 1992 GL-2	Kashima Antlers	4–3 (sudden-death) (a.e.t.)	Verdy Kawasaki	Tokyo National Stadium
19:00 JST (UTC+09:00)	Hasegawa 18' 114'; Kurosaki 48'; Zico 50'	J. League	Miura 8'; Kitazawa 39'; Takeda 54'	Attendance: 18,009; Referee: Tatsumi Ōno; Assistant referees: Takeshi Ōkura; Naotsugu Fuse; Fourth official: Ryūichi Mogi

13 September 1992 GL-3	JEF United Ichihara	1–0 (sudden-death) (a.e.t.)	Kashima Antlers	Ota Stadium
14:02 JST (UTC+09:00)	Franta 103'	J. League		Attendance: 6,829; Referee: Yū Nakamura; Assistant referees: Mitsuru Satō; Takashi Kunori; Fourth official: Hiromitsu Hirayama

19 September 1992 GL-4	Urawa Red Diamonds	3–2	Kashima Antlers	Omiya Football Stadium
18:00 JST (UTC+09:00)	Hashiratani 19', 86'; Fukuda 77'	J. League	Santos 44'; Milton 75'	Attendance: 8,948; Referee: Masahiro Sogawa; Assistant referees: Masahiko Natsui; Kimio Izaki; Fourth official: Morihiko Yamaji

23 September 1992 GL-5	Yokohama Marinos	4–3 (sudden-death) (a.e.t.)	Kashima Antlers	Tokyo National Stadium
14:00 JST (UTC+09:00)	Everton 32', 54' 105+2'; Jinno 59'	J. League	Ōba 46'; Yoshida 51'; Zico 58'	Attendance: 13,145; Referee: Hitoshi Yamada; Assistant referees: Mitsuru Satō; Yū Nakamura; Fourth official: Haruo Suzuki

26 September 1992 GL-6	Kashima Antlers	1–4	Shimizu S-Pulse	Kasamatsu Stadium
15:04 JST (UTC+09:00)	Kurosaki 12'	J. League	Mirandinha 14'; Mukōjima 16', 21'; Toninho 89'	Attendance: 11,333; Referee: Kiichirō Tachi; Assistant referees: Takashi Nohara; Masato Nogami; Fourth official: Ryūichi Mogi

3 October 1992 GL-7	Nagoya Grampus Eight	1–7	Kashima Antlers	Nagoya Mizuho Football Stadium
15:00 JST (UTC+09:00)	Shimamura 69'	J. League	Kurosaki 10', 73'; Santos 49'; Hasegawa 68', 82', 89'; Zico 72'	Attendance: 11,728; Referee: Kenji Tanaka; Assistant referees: Morihisa Yamaguchi; Yasushi Tsuchimoto; Fourth official: Takao Wakahara

7 October 1992 GL-8	Kashima Antlers	1–2	Gamba Osaka	Kyoto Nishikyogoku Stadium
19:00 JST (UTC+09:00)	Santos 31'	J. League	Kusaki 42'; Kajino 64'	Attendance: 12,381; Referee: Fumikazu Shioyazono; Assistant referees: Hiroyuki Umemoto; Yōzō Tanaka; Fourth official: Ryūichi Mogi

11 October 1992 GL-9	Sanfrecce Hiroshima	0–3	Kashima Antlers	Hiroshima Stadium
14:00 JST (UTC+09:00)		J. League	Zico 19', 30', 84'	Attendance: 9,853; Referee: Hiroyuki Umemoto; Assistant referees: Yōtarō Moritsu; Takayuki Kimura; Fourth official: Kōji Ueno

16 October 1992 Semifinals	Verdy Kawasaki	1–0	Kashima Antlers	Tokyo National Stadium
19:04 JST (UTC+09:00)	Miura 64'	J. League		Attendance: 39,390; Referee: Hideo Kikuchi; Assistant referees: Masayoshi Okada; Yū Nakamura; Fourth official: Keizō Yamazaki

== Player statistics ==
No.	Pos	Nat	Player	Total		Emperor's Cup		J-League Cup	
No.	Pos	Nat	Player	Apps	Goals	Apps	Goals	Apps	Goals
	GK	(Japan) JPN	Osamu Chiba	5	0	0	0	5	0
	GK	(Japan) JPN	Masaaki Furukawa	8	0	3	0	5	0
	GK	(Japan) JPN	Yōhei Satō	0	0	0	0	0	0
	GK	(Japan) JPN	Hideaki Ozawa	0	0	0	0	0	0
	DF	(Japan) JPN	Makoto Sugiyama	11	0	2	0	9	0
	DF	(Japan) JPN	Shunzō Ōno	7	0	1	0	6	0
	DF	(Japan) JPN	Masatada Ishii	8	0	2	0	6	0
	DF	(Japan) JPN	Kenji Ōba	13	1	3	0	10	1
	DF	(Japan) JPN	Masami Akazawa	0	0	0	0	0	0
	DF	(Japan) JPN	Eiji Gaya	8	0	3	0	5	0
	DF	(Japan) JPN	Seiichi Negishi	0	0	0	0	0	0
	DF	(Japan) JPN	Toshiaki Okutomo	0	0	0	0	0	0
	DF	(Japan) JPN	Kazuhisa Irii	7	1	1	0	6	1
	DF	(Japan) JPN	Takahiro Kawaji	0	0	0	0	0	0
	DF	(Japan) JPN	Yoshikazu Fujimoto	0	0	0	0	0	0
	DF	(Japan) JPN	Kenichi Serata	0	0	0	0	0	0
	MF	(Brazil) BRA	Zico	12	7	2	1	10	6
	MF	(Brazil) BRA	Santos	13	5	3	2	10	3
	MF	(Japan) JPN	Yūman Jō	0	0	0	0	0	0
	MF	(Japan) JPN	Makoto Teguramori	0	0	0	0	0	0
	MF	(Japan) JPN	Masayoshi Hirano	0	0	0	0	0	0
	MF	(Japan) JPN	Yasuto Honda	13	0	3	0	10	0
	MF	(Japan) JPN	Yasuhiro Yoshida	9	2	3	1	6	1
	MF	(Brazil) BRA	Carlos	0	0	0	0	0	0
	MF	(Japan) JPN	Isamu Fukui	0	0	0	0	0	0
	MF	(Brazil) BRA	Regis	3	0	3	0	0	0
	MF	(Japan) JPN	Tadatoshi Masuda	0	0	0	0	0	0
	FW	(Brazil) BRA	Milton	9	2	0	0	9	2
	FW	(Japan) JPN	Jōkō Emoto	0	0	0	0	0	0
	FW	(Japan) JPN	Naruyuki Naitō	8	1	2	1	6	0
	FW	(Japan) JPN	Hiroshi Teguramori	0	0	0	0	0	0
	FW	(Japan) JPN	Hisashi Kurosaki	11	9	3	5	8	4
	FW	(Japan) JPN	Yoshiyuki Hasegawa	12	8	3	1	9	7
	FW	(Japan) JPN	Satoshi Koga	5	0	0	0	5	0
	FW	(Japan) JPN	Katsuhiro Yamaki	0	0	0	0	0	0
	FW	(Japan) JPN	Ken Kakita	0	0	0	0	0	0
	FW	(Japan) JPN	Yasuo Manaka	1	0	1	0	0	0
	FW	(Japan) JPN	Kenji Okamoto	0	0	0	0	0	0
	FW	(Japan) JPN	Kōji Takeda	0	0	0	0	0	0

- J.LEAGUE OFFICIAL GUIDE 1992-1993. ISBN 4-09-102301-0.
- J.LEAGUE OFFICIAL GUIDE 1993 Suntory series. 小学館. 1993. ISBN 4-09-102303-7.
- J.LEAGUE YEARBOOK 1999. トランスアート. April 1999. ISBN 4-88752-099-9.
- 鹿島アントラーズ栄光の10年 FOOTBALL DREAM 1992-2001. 2001. ISBN 4-583-03667-1.

== Transfers ==
In:

No.	Pos.	Nation	Player
—	GK	JPN	Osamu Chiba (from Honda)
—	GK	JPN	Hideaki Ozawa (from Mito Tanki Daigaku fuzoku High School)
—	DF	JPN	Kazuhisa Irii (from Honda)
—	MF	BRA	Santos (from Botafogo)
—	MF	BRA	Carlos (from Flamengo)
—	MF	JPN	Yasuhiro Yoshida (from Meiji University)
—	MF	JPN	Yasuto Honda (from Honda)
—	MF	BRA	Regis (from Flamengo)
—	FW	JPN	Naruyuki Naitō (from Honda)
—	FW	JPN	Hisashi Kurosaki (from Honda)
—	FW	JPN	Yoshiyuki Hasegawa (from Honda)
—	FW	JPN	Satoshi Koga (from Waseda University)
—	DF	JPN	Kenichi Serata (from Tokai University Daigo Senior High School)
—	MF	JPN	Tadatoshi Masuda (from Shizuoka Gakuen Senior High School)
—	FW	JPN	Kōji Takeda (from Sakai High School)
—	GK	JPN	Masaaki Furukawa (from Honda Sayama FC)

Out:

No.	Pos.	Nation	Player
1	GK	JPN	Shōjirō Sakashita
2	DF	JPN	Hidenori Yokoyama
3	MF	JPN	Hiroshi Soejima (retired)
4	DF	JPN	Tsukasa Iguchi
6	MF	JPN	Masahiro Kamohara
7	MF	JPN	Osamu Morishima
11	FW	JPN	Toshihiko Chaya
12	DF	JPN	Takahiro Suzuki
19	DF	JPN	Hideki Asajima
24	MF	JPN	Hirotsugu Hokari
28	FW	BRA	Jonas Siqeira Silva
31	GK	JPN	Ken Satō
34	MF	JPN	Yūji Yamazaki
35	FW	JPN	Nobuyo Fujishiro

== Transfers during the season ==
=== In ===
none

=== Out ===
none

== Other pages ==
- (in Japanese) J. League official site
- (in Japanese) Kashima Antlers official site
