= Mazinho Oliveira =

Brazilian footballer (born 1965)

Personal information
- Full name: Waldemar Aureliano de Oliveira Filho
- Date of birth: 26 December 1965 (age 60)
- Place of birth: Rio de Janeiro, Brazil
- Height: 1.80 m (5 ft 11 in)
- Position: Forward

Senior career*
Years	Team	Apps	(Gls)
1985–1988	Santos	9	(0)
1989	Atlético Paranaense	11	(2)
1990–1991	Bragantino	33	(8)
1991–1995	Bayern Munich	49	(11)
1994	→ Internacional (loan)	9	(2)
1995	Flamengo	26	(10)
1995–1999	Kashima Antlers	100	(52)
2000	Kawasaki Frontale	8	(1)
2001	Bragantino		

International career
1990–1991	Brazil	10	(2)
- * Club domestic league appearances and goals

Waldemar Aureliano de Oliveira Filho, usually known as Mazinho Oliveira (born 26 December 1965), is a retired Brazilian footballer who played as a forward.

== Career statistics ==
=== Club ===
Club performance			League		Cup		Other		Total	
Season	Club	League	Apps	Goals	Apps	Goals	Apps	Goals	Apps	Goals
Brazil			League		Copa do Brasil		League Cup		Total	
1985	Santos	Série A	6	0					6	0
1986	Santos	Série A	3	0					3	0
1987	Santos	Série A	0	0					0	0
1988	Santos	Série A	0	0					0	0
1989	Atlético Paranaense	Série A	11	3					11	3
1990	Bragantino	Série A	12	2					12	2
1991	Bragantino	Série A	21	6					21	6
Germany			League		DFB-Pokal		Europe		Total	
1991–92	Bayern Munich	Bundesliga	28	8	1	2	4	2	33	12
1992–93	Bayern Munich	Bundesliga	17	3	2	2	-		19	5
1993–94	Bayern Munich	Bundesliga	1	0	0	0	0	0	1	0
Brazil			League		Copa do Brasil		League Cup		Total	
1994	Internacional	Série A	9	2					9	2
Germany			League		DFB-Pokal		Europe		Total	
1994–95	Bayern Munich	Bundesliga	3	0	0	0	1	0	4	0
Brazil			League		Copa do Brasil		League Cup		Total	
1995	Flamengo	Série A	0	0					0	0
Japan			League		Emperor's Cup		J.League Cup		Total	
1995	Kashima Antlers	J1 League	9	4	2	2	-		11	6
1996	Kashima Antlers	J1 League	19	11	3	3	13	2	35	16
1997	Kashima Antlers	J1 League	31	22	5	7	12	6	48	35
1998	Kashima Antlers	J1 League	24	9	4	1	4	2	32	12
1999	Kashima Antlers	J1 League	17	6	2	0	1	0	20	6
2000	Kawasaki Frontale	J1 League	8	1	0	0	1	1	9	2
Brazil			League		Copa do Brasil		League Cup		Total	
2001	Bragantino	Série B	0	0					0	0
Country	Brazil		62	13					62	13
Country	Germany		49	11	3	4	5	2	57	17
Country	Japan		108	53	16	13	31	11	155	77
Total			219	77	16	13	31	11	266	101

=== International ===
Brazil national team
Year	Apps	Goals
1990	1	0
1991	9	2
Total	10	2
