= Kenichi Hashimoto =

Japanese footballer

Kenichi Hashimoto 橋本 研一
Personal information
- Full name: Kenichi Hashimoto
- Date of birth: April 16, 1975 (age 51)
- Place of birth: Kanagawa, Japan
- Height: 1.77 m (5 ft 9 1/2 in)
- Position: Forward

Youth career
- 1991–1993: Toin Gakuen High School

Senior career*
Years	Team	Apps	(Gls)
1994–1996	Kashima Antlers	27	(3)
1997	Yokohama Marinos	0	(0)
1998–1999	Tokyo Fulie		
1999	Yokohama FC	4	(0)
Total		31	(3)
Medal record
Kashima Antlers
Winner	J1 League	1996
- * Club domestic league appearances and goals

Kenichi Hashimoto (橋本 研一, Hashimoto Kenichi; born April 16, 1975) is a former Japanese football player.

== Playing career ==
Hashimoto was born in Kanagawa Prefecture on April 16, 1975. After graduating from high school, he joined the Kashima Antlers in 1994. He played many matches as forward during the first season. However he did not play in 1996 and he moved to the Yokohama Marinos in 1997. He did not play much while there. Through Tokyo Fulie in 1998, he joined a new club Yokohama FC which was founded by Yokohama Flügels supporters in 1999, and he retired at the end of the 1999 season.

== Club statistics ==
Club performance			League		Cup		League Cup		Total	
Season	Club	League	Apps	Goals	Apps	Goals	Apps	Goals	Apps	Goals
Japan			League		Emperor's Cup		J.League Cup		Total	
1994	Kashima Antlers	J1 League	12	1	1	0	0	0	13	1
1995	Kashima Antlers	J1 League	15	2	0	0	-		15	2
1996	Kashima Antlers	J1 League	0	0	0	0	0	0	0	0
1997	Yokohama Marinos	J1 League	0	0	0	0	1	0	1	0
1999	Yokohama FC	Football League	4	0	0	0	-		4	0
Total			31	3	1	0	1	0	33	3
