= 1999 J.League Cup =

J.League Yamazaki Nabisco Cup

Tournament details
- Country: Japan

Final positions
- Champions: Kashiwa Reysol (1st title)
- Runners-up: Kashima Antlers
- Semifinalists: FC Tokyo; Nagoya Grampus Eight

Statistics of J. League Cup, officially the '99 J.League Yamazaki Nabisco Cup, in the 1999 season.

== Overview ==
It was contested by 26 teams, and Kashiwa Reysol won the championship.

== Results ==
=== First round ===
- Consadole Sapporo 1–0; 0–3 Avispa Fukuoka
- Albirex Niigata 0–3; 0–2 Kashiwa Reysol
- Vegalta Sendai 1–2; 1–4 Sanfrecce Hiroshima
- Montedio Yamagata 0–5; 1–4 Kyoto Purple Sanga
- Omiya Ardija 1–1; 0–3 Yokohama F. Marinos
- FC Tokyo 1–1; 2–1 Vissel Kobe
- Kawasaki Frontale 1–3; 1–0 Gamba Osaka
- Ventforet Kofu 0–2; 1–1 Verdy Kawasaki
- Sagan Tosu 0–3; 0–2 Cerezo Osaka
- Oita Trinita 2–1; 0–0 Bellmare Hiratsuka

=== Second round ===
- Avispa Fukuoka 1–1; 0–1 Jubilo Iwata
- Cerezo Osaka 0–2; 2–1 Kashiwa Reysol
- Kyoto Purple Sanga 1–0; 0–2 Shimizu S-Pulse
- Verdy Kawasaki 0–3; 2–4 Nagoya Grampus Eight
- FC Tokyo 1–2; 4–1 JEF United Ichihara
- Sanfrecce Hiroshima 2–3; 0–1 Yokohama F. Marinos
- Gamba Osaka 1–1; 0–1 Kashima Antlers
- Oita Trinita 1–0; 1–3 Urawa Red Diamonds

=== Quarterfinals ===
- Kashiwa Reysol 1–1; 2–0 Jubilo Iwata
- Nagoya Grampus Eight 3–2; 0–0 Shimizu S-Pulse
- Yokohama F. Marinos 0–3; 2–0 FC Tokyo
- Urawa Red Diamonds 2–0; 0–3 Kashima Antlers

=== Semifinals ===
- Nagoya Grampus Eight 1–3; 2–1 Kashiwa Reysol
- Kashima Antlers 2–0; 1–1 FC Tokyo

=== Final ===
- Kashiwa Reysol 2–2 (PK 5–4) Kashima Antlers

Kashiwa Reysol won the cup.
