= 1997 J.League Cup =

J.League Yamazaki Nabisco Cup

Tournament details
- Country: Japan
- Teams: 20

Final positions
- Champions: Kashima Antlers (1st title)
- Runners-up: Jubilo Iwata
- Semifinalists: Nagoya Grampus Eight; Yokohama Flugels

Statistics of J. League Cup, officially the '97 J.League Yamazaki Nabisco Cup, in the 1997 season.

== Overview ==
It was contested by 20 teams, and Kashima Antlers won the cup.

== Results ==
=== Group A ===
Pos	Team	Pld	W	D	L	GF	GA	GD	Pts	Qualification
1	JEF United Ichihara	6	5	0	1	15	5	+10	15	Quarterfinals
2	Shimizu S-Pulse	6	2	3	1	7	6	+1	9	
3	Bellmare Hiratsuka	6	2	2	2	14	10	+4	8	
4	Brummel Sendai	6	0	1	5	5	20	−15	1	

Source: rsssf.com

=== Group B ===
Pos	Team	Pld	W	D	L	GF	GA	GD	Pts	Qualification
1	Consadole Sapporo	6	2	3	1	12	10	+2	9	Quarterfinals
2	Verdy Kawasaki	6	2	3	1	9	8	+1	9	
3	Gamba Osaka	6	2	1	3	10	11	−1	7	
4	Yokohama Marinos	6	2	1	3	10	12	−2	7	

Source: rsssf.com

=== Group C ===
Pos	Team	Pld	W	D	L	GF	GA	GD	Pts	Qualification
1	Kashima Antlers	6	3	2	1	16	9	+7	11	Quarterfinals
2	Urawa Red Diamonds	6	2	4	0	9	3	+6	10	Quarterfinals
3	Cerezo Osaka	6	2	2	2	11	10	+1	8	
4	Sagan Tosu	6	0	2	4	1	15	−14	2	

Source: rsssf.com

=== Group D ===
Pos	Team	Pld	W	D	L	GF	GA	GD	Pts	Qualification
1	Kashiwa Reysol	6	3	2	1	13	5	+8	11	Quarterfinals
2	Nagoya Grampus Eight	6	2	3	1	10	8	+2	9	Quarterfinals
3	Sanfrecce Hiroshima	6	2	1	3	8	11	−3	7	
4	Vissel Kobe	6	1	2	3	6	13	−7	5	

Source: rsssf.com

=== Group E ===
Pos	Team	Pld	W	D	L	GF	GA	GD	Pts	Qualification
1	Jubilo Iwata	6	4	2	0	12	6	+6	14	Quarterfinals
2	Yokohama Flugels	6	3	2	1	5	3	+2	11	Quarterfinals
3	Kyoto Purple Sanga	6	1	1	4	5	9	−4	4	
4	Avispa Fukuoka	6	0	3	3	6	10	−4	3	

Source: rsssf.com

=== Quarterfinals ===
- Nagoya Grampus Eight 4–0; 1–1 JEF United Ichihara
- Consadole Sapporo 1–2; 0–7 Kashima Antlers
- Urawa Red Diamonds 0–0; 2–3 Jubilo Iwata
- Yokohama Flugels 0–1; 3–0 Kashiwa Reysol

=== Semifinals ===
- Kashima Antlers 1–0; 0–0 Nagoya Grampus Eight
- Yokohama Flugels 1–0; 0–2 Jubilo Iwata

=== Final ===
- Jubilo Iwata 1–2; 1–5 Kashima Antlers

Kashima Antlers won the cup.
