= 2002 J.League Division 1 =

10th season of J1 League

J.League Division 1
- Season: 2002
- Champions: Júbilo Iwata; 3rd J.League title 4th Japanese title
- Relegated: Sanfrecce Hiroshima; Consadole Sapporo
- Matches: 240
- Goals: 683 (2.85 per match)
- Top goalscorer: Naohiro Takahara (26 goals)
- Highest attendance: 57,902 Reds vs. Júbilo (July 13)
- Lowest attendance: 3,287 JEF Utd. vs Vegalta (September 18）
- Average attendance: 16,368

The 2002 J.League Division 1 season was the tenth season since the establishment of the J.League Division 1. The league began on March 2 and ended on November 30. The Suntory Championship was not held, because Júbilo Iwata was the winner of both stages. At the end of the season, Sanfrecce Hiroshima and Consadole Sapporo were relegated to J2.

== General ==
=== Promotion and relegation ===
- At the end of the 2001 season, Kyoto Purple Sanga and Vegalta Sendai were promoted to J1.
- At the end of the 2001 season, Avispa Fukuoka and Cerezo Osaka were relegated to J2.

=== Changes in competition formats ===
- Extra time was scratched for J.League Division 2. After regulation time, clubs in J2 now receives 3pts for a win, 1pt for a tie, and 0pts for a loss. (NOTE: J1 still has extra time)

=== Changes in clubs ===
none

== Honours ==
Competition	Champion	Runner-up	3rd place
J.League Division 1	Júbilo Iwata	Yokohama F. Marinos	Gamba Osaka
J.League Division 2	Oita Trinita	Cerezo Osaka	Albirex Niigata
Emperor's Cup	Kyoto Purple Sanga	Kashima Antlers	JEF United Ichihara; Sanfrecce Hiroshima
Nabisco Cup	Kashima Antlers	Urawa Red Diamonds	Gamba Osaka; Shimizu S-Pulse
XEROX Super Cup	Shimizu S-Pulse	Kashima Antlers	

== Clubs ==
Location of the clubs in Japan

The following sixteen clubs participated in J.League Division 1 during 2002 season. Of these clubs, Kyoto Purple Sanga and Vegalta Sendai were promoted from Division 2.

- Consadole Sapporo
- FC Tokyo
- Gamba Osaka
- JEF United Ichihara
- Júbilo Iwata
- Kashima Antlers
- Kashiwa Reysol
- Kyoto Purple Sanga
- Nagoya Grampus Eight
- Sanfrecce Hiroshima
- Shimizu S-Pulse
- Tokyo Verdy 1969
- Urawa Red Diamonds
- Vegalta Sendai
- Vissel Kobe
- Yokohama F. Marinos

=== Personnel ===
Club	Head coach
Consadole Sapporo	(South Korea) Chang Woe-ryong
FC Tokyo	(Japan) Hiromi Hara
Gamba Osaka	(Japan) Akira Nishino
JEF United Ichihara	(Slovakia) Jozef Vengloš
Júbilo Iwata	(Japan) Masakazu Suzuki
Kashima Antlers	(Brazil) Toninho Cerezo
Kashiwa Reysol	(Brazil) Marco Aurélio
Kyoto Purple Sanga	(Germany) Gert Engels
Nagoya Grampus Eight	(Slovenia) Zdenko Verdenik
Sanfrecce Hiroshima	(Japan) Takahiro Kimura
Shimizu S-Pulse	(Federal Republic of Yugoslavia) Zdravko Zemunović
Tokyo Verdy 1969	(Brazil) Lori Sandri
Urawa Red Diamonds	(Netherlands) Hans Ooft
Vegalta Sendai	(Japan) Hidehiko Shimizu
Vissel Kobe	(Japan) Hiroshi Matsuda
Yokohama F. Marinos	(Japan) Yoshiaki Shimojo

=== Foreign players ===
Club	Player 1	Player 2	Player 3	Non-visa foreign	Type-C contract	Former players
Consadole Sapporo	(Brazil) Biju	(Brazil) Jadílson	(Federal Republic of Yugoslavia) Srđan Baljak			(Brazil) Luis Robson (Brazil) Max Sandro
FC Tokyo	(Brazil) Amaral	(Brazil) Jean	(Brazil) Kelly		(South Korea) Oh Jang-eun	(Brazil) Marcelo Mattos
Gamba Osaka	(Brazil) Fabinho	(Brazil) Magrão	(Brazil) Marcelinho Carioca			
JEF United Ichihara	(Slovenia) Željko Milinovič	(South Korea) Choi Yong-soo		(North Korea) Kim Wi-man		(Bosnia and Herzegovina) Edin Mujčin (Slovakia) Ľubomír Moravčík
Júbilo Iwata	(Brazil) Rodrigo Gral	(Federal Republic of Yugoslavia) Aleksandar Živković	(Netherlands) Arno van Zwam		(South Korea) Kim Geun-chol	
Kashima Antlers	(Brazil) Augusto César	(Brazil) Euller	(Brazil) Fabiano			
Kashiwa Reysol	(Brazil) César Sampaio	(Brazil) Edílson	(Brazil) Ricardinho Santos		(Brazil) Ricardinho Oliveira	(South Korea) Hwang Sun-hong (South Korea) Yoo Sang-chul
Kyoto Purple Sanga	(Paraguay) Daniel Sanabria	(South Korea) An Hyo-yeon	(South Korea) Park Ji-sung			(Australia) Ned Zelic (Paraguay) Richard Estigarribia
Nagoya Grampus Eight	(Austria) Ivica Vastić	(Brazil) Ueslei	(Croatia) Andrej Panadić	(Bolivia) Ko Ishikawa		(Brazil) Marcelo Ramos (Netherlands) Tarik Oulida (South Korea) Chong Yong-de
Sanfrecce Hiroshima	(Cameroon) Michel Pensée	(Croatia) Tomislav Erceg		(Brazil) Marcus Tulio Tanaka (North Korea) Ri Han-jae		(Federal Republic of Yugoslavia) Neško Milovanović
Shimizu S-Pulse	(Bosnia and Herzegovina) Srđan Pecelj	(Brazil) Baron	(South Korea) Ahn Jung-hwan	(Brazil) Juninho		(Brazil) Alair (Croatia) Igor Cvitanović
Tokyo Verdy 1969	(Brazil) Alexandre Lopes	(Brazil) Edmundo	(Brazil) Marquinhos			
Urawa Red Diamonds	(Australia) Ned Zelic	(Brazil) Emerson Sheik	(Brazil) Tuto			(Brazil) Harison
Vegalta Sendai	(Brazil) Marcos	(Brazil) Ricardo	(Brazil) Silvinho	(Philippines) Satoshi Ōtomo		
Vissel Kobe	(Brazil) Harison	(Brazil) Oséas	(Brazil) Sidiclei			(Brazil) Ataliba (Brazil) Daniel
Yokohama F. Marinos	(Brazil) Dutra	(Brazil) Nasa	(Brazil) Will		(Brazil) Léo Paulista	

== Overview ==
=== First stage ===
Pos	Team	Pld	W	OTW	D	L	GF	GA	GD	Pts	Qualification
1	Júbilo Iwata	15	9	4	1	1	39	17	+22	36	Qualification to the Suntory Championship
2	Yokohama F. Marinos	15	8	3	3	1	28	11	+17	33	
3	Nagoya Grampus Eight	15	9	1	0	5	28	18	+10	29	
4	Gamba Osaka	15	8	1	1	5	35	19	+16	27	
5	Kashima Antlers (Note: Champion from 2001 J.League Division 1)	15	9	0	0	6	21	18	+3	27	
6	Kyoto Purple Sanga (Note: Promoted from 2001 J.League Division 2)	15	5	4	1	5	26	18	+8	24	
7	Shimizu S-Pulse (Note: Cup-Winner 2001 Emperor's Cup)	15	5	3	3	4	17	19	−2	24	
8	JEF United Ichihara	15	6	1	3	5	22	23	−1	23	
9	Vegalta Sendai	15	6	1	0	8	23	27	−4	20	
10	FC Tokyo	15	5	0	2	8	23	27	−4	17	
11	Urawa Red Diamonds	15	3	2	1	9	21	24	−3	14	
12	Tokyo Verdy 1969	15	2	3	1	9	15	24	−9	13	
13	Vissel Kobe	15	3	1	1	10	12	22	−10	12	
14	Kashiwa Reysol	15	3	1	0	11	20	31	−11	11	
15	Sanfrecce Hiroshima	15	3	0	1	11	14	26	−12	10	
16	Consadole Sapporo	15	2	0	0	13	15	35	−20	6	

Source: J.League Data Site

=== Second stage ===
Pos	Team	Pld	W	OTW	D	L	GF	GA	GD	Pts	Qualification
1	Júbilo Iwata	15	9	4	0	2	33	13	+20	35	Qualification to the Suntory Championship
2	Gamba Osaka	15	7	3	0	5	24	13	+11	27	
3	Kashima Antlers (Note: Champion from 2001 J.League Division 1)	15	8	1	0	6	25	21	+4	26	
4	Tokyo Verdy 1969	15	6	2	2	5	26	19	+7	24	
5	FC Tokyo	15	6	2	0	7	20	19	+1	22	
6	Yokohama F. Marinos	15	5	3	1	6	16	16	0	22	
7	Kyoto Purple Sanga (Note: Promoted from 2001 J.League Division 2)	15	6	2	0	7	18	24	−6	22	
8	Urawa Red Diamonds	15	4	4	1	6	20	14	+6	21	
9	Kashiwa Reysol	15	6	0	3	6	18	17	+1	21	
10	Vissel Kobe	15	5	1	2	7	21	22	−1	19	
11	JEF United Ichihara	15	6	0	0	9	16	19	−3	18	
12	Shimizu S-Pulse (Note: Cup-Winner 2001 Emperor's Cup)	15	5	1	0	9	16	24	−8	17	
13	Nagoya Grampus Eight	15	5	0	1	9	21	23	−2	16	
14	Sanfrecce Hiroshima	15	4	1	2	8	18	21	−3	16	
15	Vegalta Sendai	15	3	1	1	10	17	30	−13	12	
16	Consadole Sapporo	15	2	1	1	11	15	29	−14	9	

Source: J.League Data Site

=== Championship ===
The Suntory Championship was not held, because Júbilo Iwata was winner of both stages.

=== Overall table ===
Pos	Team	Pld	W	OTW	D	L	GF	GA	GD	Pts	Qualification or relegation
1	Júbilo Iwata	30	18	8	1	3	72	30	+42	71	Champion and qualified for the 2004 AFC Champions League (Note: AFC Champions League 2003–04 was not held, therefore Jubilo later qualified for the 2004 AFC Champions League.)
2	Yokohama F. Marinos	30	13	6	4	7	44	27	+17	55	
3	Gamba Osaka	30	15	4	1	10	59	32	+27	54	
4	Kashima Antlers (Note: Champion from 2001 J.League Division 1)	30	17	1	0	12	46	39	+7	53	
5	Kyoto Purple Sanga (Note: Promoted from 2001 J.League Division 2)	30	11	6	1	12	44	42	+2	46	Cup-Winner 2002 Emperor's Cup qualified for the AFC Champions League 2003–04 (Note: AFC Champions League 2003–04 was not held, therefore Kyoto Sanga was later qualified for the 2004 AFC Champions League. But Sanga was relegated to the Division 2 in 2003, so this spot was withdrawn.)
6	Nagoya Grampus Eight	30	14	1	1	14	49	41	+8	45	
7	JEF United Ichihara	30	12	1	3	14	38	42	−4	41	
8	Shimizu S-Pulse (Note: Cup-Winner 2001 Emperor's Cup)	30	10	4	3	13	33	43	−10	41	
9	FC Tokyo	30	11	2	2	15	43	46	−3	39	
10	Tokyo Verdy 1969	30	8	5	3	14	41	43	−2	37	
11	Urawa Red Diamonds	30	7	6	2	15	41	38	+3	35	
12	Kashiwa Reysol	30	9	1	3	17	38	48	−10	32	
13	Vegalta Sendai	30	9	2	1	18	40	57	−17	32	
14	Vissel Kobe	30	8	2	3	17	33	44	−11	31	
15	Sanfrecce Hiroshima	30	7	1	3	19	32	47	−15	26	Relegated to the 2003 J.League Division 2
16	Consadole Sapporo	30	4	1	1	24	30	64	−34	15	Relegated to the 2003 J.League Division 2

== Top scorers ==
Pos	Footballer	Club	Goals	PK	GP	Shots	Goals Per Game
1st	(Japan) Naohiro Takahara	Júbilo Iwata	26	2/2	27	79	1.04
2nd	(Brazil) Magrão	Gamba Osaka	22	5/5	29	81	0.73
3rd	(Brazil) Ueslei	Nagoya Grampus Eight	20	2/2	27	115	0.76
4th	(Brazil) Marcos	Vegalta Sendai	18	2/2	24	79	0.72
5th	(Japan) Masashi Nakayama	Júbilo Iwata	16	1/1	29	79	0.54
5th	(Brazil) Edmundo	Tokyo Verdy 1969	16	5/5	26	110	0.57
5th	(South Korea) Choi Yong-soo	JEF United Ichihara	16	7/8	23	74	0.68
8th	(Brazil) Emerson Sheik	Urawa Red Diamonds	15	1/1	24	118	0.61
8th	(Brazil) Amaral	FC Tokyo	15	4/4	29	72	0.54
10th	(Brazil) Will	Yokohama F. Marinos	14	2/2	24	97	0.55

== Awards ==
=== Individual ===
Award	Recipient	Club
Player of the Year	(Japan) Naohiro Takahara	Júbilo Iwata
Young Player of the Year	(Japan) Keisuke Tsuboi	Urawa Red Diamonds
Manager of the Year	(Japan) Masakazu Suzuki	Júbilo Iwata
Top Scorer	(Japan) Naohiro Takahara	Júbilo Iwata

=== Best Eleven ===
Position	Footballer	Club	Nationality
GK	Hitoshi Sogahata (1)	Kashima Antlers	Japan
DF	Hideto Suzuki (1)	Júbilo Iwata	Japan
DF	Makoto Tanaka (2)	Júbilo Iwata	Japan
DF	Naoki Matsuda (2)	Yokohama F. Marinos	Japan
MF	Hiroshi Nanami (2)	Júbilo Iwata	Japan
MF	Mitsuo Ogasawara (2)	Kashima Antlers	Japan
MF	Takashi Fukunishi (3)	Júbilo Iwata	Japan
MF	Toshiya Fujita (3)	Júbilo Iwata	Japan
FW	Emerson Sheik (1)	Urawa Red Diamonds	Brazil
FW	Masashi Nakayama (4)	Júbilo Iwata	Japan
FW	Naohiro Takahara (1)	Júbilo Iwata	Japan

* The number in brackets denotes the number of times that the footballer has appeared in the Best 11.

== Attendances ==
Team	Attendance (Average)	
Team	Division 1	Division 2
Urawa Red Diamonds	394,445 (26,296)	
Yokohama F. Marinos	361,613 (24,108)	
FC Tokyo	332,597 (22,173)	
Vegalta Sendai	327,925 (21,862)	
Kashima Antlers	323,855 (21,590)	
Albirex Niigata		472,507 (21,478)
Consadole Sapporo	287,098 (19,140)	
Júbilo Iwata	248,462 (16,564)	
Nagoya Grampus Eight	244,848 (16,323)	
Tokyo Verdy 1969	226,926 (15,128)	
Shimizu S-Pulse	224,443 (14,963)	
Gamba Osaka	191,429 (12,762)	
Oita Trinita		271,669 (12,349)
Kashiwa Reysol	169,716 (11,314)	
Sanfrecce Hiroshima	164,111 (10,941)	
Vissel Kobe	157,011 (10,467)	
Kyoto Purple Sanga	155,276 (10,352)	
Cerezo Osaka		174,951 (7,952)
JEF United Ichihara	118,460 (7,897)	
Avispa Fukuoka		142,808 (6,491)
Omiya Ardija		115,846 (5,266)
Kawasaki Frontale		115,431 (5,247)
Ventforet Kofu		108,108 (4,914)
Shonan Bellmare		100,125 (4,551)
Sagan Tosu		85,586 (3,890)
Montedio Yamagata		82,601 (3,755)
Yokohama FC		76,498 (3,477)
Mito HollyHock		60,262 (2,739)
