= 2002 Vegalta Sendai season =

Vegalta Sendai
2002 season
- Chairman: Kyogoku Akira
- Manager: Hidehiko Shimizu
- Stadium: Sendai Stadium
- J. League 1: 13th
- J.League Cup: GL-A 3rd
- Emperor's Cup: Fourth round
- Top goalscorer: Marcos (18)
Home colours	Away colours

2002 Vegalta Sendai season

== Competitions ==
Competitions	Position
J.League 1	13th / 16 clubs
Emperor's Cup	4th round
J.League Cup	GL-A 3rd / 4 clubs

== Domestic results ==
=== J.League 1 ===
==== First stage ====
Pos	Team	Pld	W	OTW	D	L	GF	GA	GD	Pts
7	Shimizu S-Pulse (Note: Cup-Winner 2001 Emperor's Cup)	15	5	3	3	4	17	19	−2	24
8	JEF United Ichihara	15	6	1	3	5	22	23	−1	23
9	Vegalta Sendai (Note: Promoted from 2001 J.League Division 2)	15	6	1	0	8	23	27	−4	20
10	FC Tokyo	15	5	0	2	8	23	27	−4	17
11	Urawa Red Diamonds	15	3	2	1	9	21	24	−3	14

Source: J.League Data Site
Notes:

Match	Date	Venue	Opponents	Score
1–1	2002.3.3	Sendai Stadium	Tokyo Verdy 1969	1–0
1–2	2002.3.9	Haruno Stadium	Consadole Sapporo	1–0
1–3	2002.3.16	Sendai Stadium	Kashiwa Reysol	5–2
1–4	2002.3.31	Sendai Stadium	Vissel Kobe	2–1 (g.g.)
1–5	2002.4.6	Kashima Soccer Stadium	Kashima Antlers	2–0
1–6	2002.4.14	Miyagi Stadium	Urawa Red Diamonds	1–2 (g.g.)
1–7	2002.4.21	Sendai Stadium	FC Tokyo	3–1
1–8	2002.7.13	Mitsuzawa Stadium	Yokohama F. Marinos	0–2
1–9	2002.7.20	Nihondaira Sports Stadium	Shimizu S-Pulse	0–1
1–10	2002.7.24	Sendai Stadium	JEF United Ichihara	2–3 (g.g.)
1–11	2002.7.28	Kanazawa (ja:石川県西部緑地公園陸上競技場)	Gamba Osaka	0–3
1–12	2002.8.3	Sendai Stadium	Sanfrecce Hiroshima	4–2
1–13	2002.8.7	Sendai Stadium	Nagoya Grampus Eight	1–4
1–14	2002.8.10	Yamaha Stadium	Júbilo Iwata	0–4
1–15	2002.8.17	Tottori Soccer Stadium	Kyoto Purple Sanga	1–2 (g.g.)

==== Second stage ====
Pos	Team	Pld	W	OTW	D	L	GF	GA	GD	Pts
12	Shimizu S-Pulse (Note: Cup-Winner 2001 Emperor's Cup)	15	5	1	0	9	16	24	−8	17
13	Nagoya Grampus Eight	15	5	0	1	9	21	23	−2	16
14	Sanfrecce Hiroshima	15	4	1	2	8	18	21	−3	16
15	Vegalta Sendai (Note: Promoted from 2001 J.League Division 2)	15	3	1	1	10	17	30	−13	12
16	Consadole Sapporo	15	2	1	1	11	15	29	−14	9

Source: J.League Data Site
Notes:

Match	Date	Venue	Opponents	Score
2–1	2002.8.31	Sendai Stadium	Kashima Antlers	1–2
2–2	2002.9.8	Saitama Stadium 2002	Urawa Red Diamonds	0–1 (g.g.)
2–3	2002.9.14	Sendai Stadium	Yokohama F. Marinos	1–0
2–4	2002.9.18	Ichihara Seaside Stadium	JEF United Ichihara	1–3
2–5	2002.9.21	Sendai Stadium	Shimizu S-Pulse	3–1
2–6	2002.9.28	Hitachi Kashiwa Soccer Stadium	Kashiwa Reysol	0–1
2–7	2002.10.5	Hiroshima Stadium	Sanfrecce Hiroshima	2–1 (g.g.)
2–8	2002.10.12	Sendai Stadium	Gamba Osaka	0–6
2–9	2002.10.20	Miyagi Stadium	Júbilo Iwata	2–3 (g.g.)
2–10	2002.10.23	Mizuho Athletic Stadium	Nagoya Grampus Eight	1–3
2–11	2002.10.26	Tokyo Stadium	FC Tokyo	0–2
2–12	2002.11.10	Sendai Stadium	Kyoto Purple Sanga	1–2
2–13	2002.11.16	Kobe Universiade Memorial Stadium	Vissel Kobe	2–2 (a.e.t.)
2–14	2002.11.23	Sendai Stadium	Consadole Sapporo	2–0
2–15	2002.11.30	Tokyo Stadium	Tokyo Verdy 1969	1–3

=== Emperor's Cup ===
Match	Date	Venue	Opponents	Score
3rd round	2002..			-
4th round	2002..			-

=== J.League Cup ===
Pos	Team	Pld	W	D	L	GF	GA	GD	Pts	Qualification
1	Jubilo Iwata	6	3	3	0	9	2	+7	12	Quarterfinals
2	Kashiwa Reysol	6	1	4	1	2	2	0	7	Quarterfinals
3	Vegalta Sendai	6	1	3	2	4	8	−4	6	
4	Consadole Sapporo	6	1	2	3	3	6	−3	5	

Source: rsssf.com

27 April 2002 1	Júbilo Iwata	5–1	Vegalta Sendai	Kagoshima
14:00	Nishi 3'; Živković 7'; Fujita 25', 54'; Nakayama 50'	Report	Murakami 49'	Stadium: Kagoshima Kamoike Stadium; Attendance: 10,487; Referee: Toru Kamikawa

30 April 2002 2	Vegalta Sendai	1–1	Kashiwa Reysol	Sendai
19:00	unknown 59' (o.g.)	Report	Ono 48'	Stadium: Sendai Stadium; Attendance: 12,109; Referee: Masayoshi Okada

3 May 2002 3	Vegalta Sendai	1–0	Consadole Sapporo	Sendai
13:00	Fujiyoshi 69'	Report		Stadium: Sendai Stadium; Attendance: 16,641; Referee: Toshimitsu Yoshida

6 May 2002 4	Consadole Sapporo	1–1	Vegalta Sendai	Hakodate
13:00	Ogura 29'	Report	Moriyasu 31'	Stadium: Chiyogadai Park Athletic Studium; Attendance: 8,263; Referee: Keiichi Sunakawa

9 May 2002 5	Kashiwa Reysol	0–0	Vegalta Sendai	Kashiwa
19:00		Report		Stadium: Kashiwanoha Stadium; Attendance: 4,849; Referee: Joji Kashihara

12 May 2002 6	Vegalta Sendai	0–1	Júbilo Iwata	Sendai
13:03		Report	Kawamura 80'	Stadium: Sendai Stadium; Attendance: 19,118; Referee: Kiyoshi Ōta

== International results ==
28 May 2002 Training match	Vegalta Sendai	1–0	Argentina	Naraha, Fukushima
	Yamashita 45'	Report		Stadium: J-Village Stadium
Note: The match was played in two halves of 25 minutes each.

== Player statistics ==
No.	Pos.	Player	D.o.B. (Age)	Height / Weight	J.League 1		Emperor's Cup		J.League Cup		Total	
No.	Pos.	Player	D.o.B. (Age)	Height / Weight	Apps	Goals	Apps	Goals	Apps	Goals	Apps	Goals
1	GK	Norio Takahashi	March 15, 1971 (aged 30)	cm / kg	18	0						
2	DF	Susumu Watanabe	October 10, 1973 (aged 28)	cm / kg	2	0						
3	DF	Ichizo Nakata	April 19, 1973 (aged 28)	cm / kg	0	0						
4	DF	Norio Omura	September 6, 1969 (aged 32)	cm / kg	28	4						
5	DF	Tomohiro Katanosaka	April 18, 1971 (aged 30)	cm / kg	15	0						
6	DF	Ricardo	February 23, 1977 (aged 25)	cm / kg	28	1						
7	MF	Naoki Chiba	July 24, 1977 (aged 24)	cm / kg	17	0						
8	MF	Silvinho	January 17, 1977 (aged 25)	cm / kg	27	2						
9	FW	Marcos	March 21, 1974 (aged 27)	cm / kg	24	18						
10	MF	Nobuyuki Zaizen	October 19, 1976 (aged 25)	cm / kg	18	0						
11	FW	Shinji Fujiyoshi	April 3, 1970 (aged 31)	cm / kg	9	1						
13	FW	Yoshiteru Yamashita	November 21, 1977 (aged 24)	cm / kg	30	10						
14	MF	Teruo Iwamoto	May 2, 1972 (aged 29)	cm / kg	22	4						
15	MF	Koji Nakajima	August 20, 1977 (aged 24)	cm / kg	0	0						
16	GK	Kiyomitsu Kobari	June 12, 1977 (aged 24)	cm / kg	12	0						
17	DF	Kazuya Iio	April 10, 1980 (aged 21)	cm / kg	0	0						
18	DF	Yusuke Mori	July 24, 1980 (aged 21)	cm / kg	11	0						
19	FW	Shinya Mitsuoka	April 22, 1976 (aged 25)	cm / kg	7	0						
20	MF	Yasushi Fukunaga	March 6, 1973 (aged 28)	cm / kg	6	0						
21	GK	Tatsuro Hagihara	August 6, 1982 (aged 19)	cm / kg	0	0						
22	GK	Taiki Maekawa	July 22, 1979 (aged 22)	cm / kg	0	0						
23	MF	Shin Nakamura	May 6, 1974 (aged 27)	cm / kg	3	0						
24	MF	Yasushi Kido	June 14, 1982 (aged 19)	cm / kg	0	0						
25	FW	Nozomu Kamma	April 27, 1978 (aged 23)	cm / kg	0	0						
26	MF	Kazuhiro Murakami	January 20, 1981 (aged 21)	cm / kg	18	0						
27	MF	Hajime Moriyasu	August 23, 1968 (aged 33)	cm / kg	27	0						
28	DF	Toshihiro Yahata	May 29, 1980 (aged 21)	cm / kg	0	0						
29	FW	Satoshi Ōtomo	October 1, 1981 (aged 20)	cm / kg	4	0						
30	DF	Tatsuya Murata	August 8, 1972 (aged 29)	cm / kg	25	0						
31	MF	Yosuke Nishi	May 12, 1983 (aged 18)	cm / kg	0	0						
32	MF	Takahiro Yamada	April 29, 1972 (aged 29)	cm / kg	18	0						
33	DF	Takehito Suzuki	June 11, 1971 (aged 30)	cm / kg	15	0						
34	MF	Toshiyuki Abe	August 1, 1974 (aged 27)	cm / kg	10	0						
35	DF	Masahiro Ando	April 2, 1972 (aged 29)	cm / kg	12	0						
36	DF	Masahiro Kazuma	June 22, 1982 (aged 19)	cm / kg	2	0						

== Other pages ==
- (in Japanese) J. League official site
