= 2001 Vegalta Sendai season =

Vegalta Sendai
2001 season
- Chairman: Kyogoku Akira
- Manager: Hidehiko Shimizu
- Stadium: Sendai Stadium
- J. League 2: 2nd (promoted)
- J.League Cup: First round
- Emperor's Cup: Third round
- Top goalscorer: Marcos (34) (J2 top scorer)
Home colours	Away colours

2001 Vegalta Sendai season

Vegalta Sendai finished second in the J.League 2 table and earned promotion.

== Competitions ==
Competitions	Position
J.League 2	2nd / 12 clubs
Emperor's Cup	3rd round
J.League Cup	1st round

== J.League 2 ==
=== League table ===
Pos	Team	Pld	W	OTW	D	OTL	L	GF	GA	GD	Pts	Promotion
1	Kyoto Purple Sanga (Note: Relegated from 2000 J.League Division 1) (C)	44	23	5	5	0	11	79	48	+31	84	Promoted to the 2002 J.League Division 1
2	Vegalta Sendai	44	24	3	5	3	9	78	56	+22	83	Promoted to the 2002 J.League Division 1
3	Montedio Yamagata	44	20	7	6	4	7	61	39	+22	80	
4	Albirex Niigata	44	22	4	4	7	7	79	47	+32	78	
5	Omiya Ardija	44	20	6	6	1	11	73	43	+30	78	

(C) Champion

=== Results ===
10 March 2001 1	Mito HollyHock	0–1 (g.g.)	Vegalta Sendai	Hitachinaka City Stadium
JST (UTC+09)

17 March 2001 2	Yokohama FC	2–1 (g.g.)	Vegalta Sendai	Yokohama Mitsuzawa Stadium
JST (UTC+09)

25 March 2001 3	Vegalta Sendai	3–0	Ventforet Kofu	Sendai Stadium
JST (UTC+09)

31 March 2001 4	Sagan Tosu	1–4	Vegalta Sendai	Tosu Stadium
JST (UTC+09)

8 April 2001 5	Vegalta Sendai	3–2	Kyoto Purple Sanga	Sendai Stadium
JST (UTC+09)

14 April 2001 6	Albirex Niigata	0–1 (g.g.)	Vegalta Sendai	Niigata City Athletic Stadium
JST (UTC+09)

22 April 2001 7	Vegalta Sendai	4–2	Kawasaki Frontale	Sendai Stadium
JST (UTC+09)

28 April 2001 8	Shonan Bellmare	2–3	Vegalta Sendai	Hiratsuka Athletics Stadium
JST (UTC+09)

3 May 2001 9	Vegalta Sendai	2–2 (g.g.)	Montedio Yamagata	Sendai Stadium
JST (UTC+09)

6 May 2001 10	Vegalta Sendai	2–1	Oita Trinita	Sendai Stadium
JST (UTC+09)

12 May 2001 11	Omiya Ardija	2–0	Vegalta Sendai	Omiya Football Stadium
JST (UTC+09)

19 May 2001 12	Vegalta Sendai	3–0	Yokohama FC	Sendai Stadium
JST (UTC+09)

23 May 2001 13	Ventforet Kofu	1–2 (g.g.)	Vegalta Sendai	Kose Sports Park Stadium
JST (UTC+09)

27 May 2001 14	Vegalta Sendai	0–2	Albirex Niigata	Sendai Stadium
JST (UTC+09)

17 June 2001 15	Kawasaki Frontale	1–1 (g.g.)	Vegalta Sendai	Todoroki Athletics Stadium
JST (UTC+09)

23 June 2001 16	Oita Trinita	2–0	Vegalta Sendai	Oita Athletic Stadium
JST (UTC+09)

29 June 2001 17	Vegalta Sendai	0–1 (g.g.)	Omiya Ardija	Sendai Stadium
JST (UTC+09)

7 July 2001 18	Vegalta Sendai	1–0	Shonan Bellmare	Sendai Stadium
JST (UTC+09)

11 July 2001 19	Montedio Yamagata	0–2	Vegalta Sendai	Yamagata Park Stadium
JST (UTC+09)

14 July 2001 20	Vegalta Sendai	4–3	Mito HollyHock	Sendai Stadium
JST (UTC+09)

21 July 2001 21	Vegalta Sendai	3–1	Sagan Tosu	Sendai Stadium
JST (UTC+09)

25 July 2001 22	Kyoto Purple Sanga	2–1	Vegalta Sendai	Nishikyogoku Athletic Stadium
JST (UTC+09)

28 July 2001 23	Omiya Ardija	1–1 (g.g.)	Vegalta Sendai	Konosu Stadium
JST (UTC+09)

3 August 2001 24	Vegalta Sendai	4–1	Ventforet Kofu	Sendai Stadium
JST (UTC+09)

11 August 2001 25	Shonan Bellmare	0–1	Vegalta Sendai	Hiratsuka Athletics Stadium
JST (UTC+09)

14 August 2001 26	Vegalta Sendai	2–1	Montedio Yamagata	Sendai Stadium
JST (UTC+09)

18 August 2001 27	Albirex Niigata	1–0	Vegalta Sendai	Niigata Stadium
JST (UTC+09)

25 August 2001 28	Vegalta Sendai	1–2	Kawasaki Frontale	Sendai Stadium
JST (UTC+09)

1 September 2001 29	Sagan Tosu	1–2	Vegalta Sendai	Tosu Stadium
JST (UTC+09)

5 September 2001 30	Vegalta Sendai	0–0 (g.g.)	Kyoto Purple Sanga	Sendai Stadium
JST (UTC+09)

8 September 2001 31	Vegalta Sendai	0–2	Oita Trinita	Sendai Stadium
JST (UTC+09)

14 September 2001 32	Yokohama FC	3–4	Vegalta Sendai	Yumenoshima Stadium
JST (UTC+09)

19 September 2001 33	Vegalta Sendai	2–1	Mito HollyHock	Sendai Stadium
JST (UTC+09)

23 September 2001 34	Vegalta Sendai	3–2	Shonan Bellmare	Sendai Stadium
JST (UTC+09)

30 September 2001 35	Kawasaki Frontale	2–0	Vegalta Sendai	Todoroki Athletics Stadium
JST (UTC+09)

6 October 2001 36	Vegalta Sendai	4–2	Albirex Niigata	Sendai Stadium
JST (UTC+09)

13 October 2001 37	Montedio Yamagata	0–2	Vegalta Sendai	Yamagata Park Stadium
JST (UTC+09)

17 October 2001 38	Oita Trinita	0–2	Vegalta Sendai	Kumamoto Athletics Stadium
JST (UTC+09)

21 October 2001 39	Vegalta Sendai	1–1 (g.g.)	Omiya Ardija	Sendai Stadium
JST (UTC+09)

28 October 2001 40	Mito HollyHock	2–3	Vegalta Sendai	Kasamatsu Stadium
JST (UTC+09)

3 November 2001 41	Vegalta Sendai	2–1	Yokohama FC	Sendai Stadium
JST (UTC+09)

6 November 2001 42	Ventforet Kofu	3–0	Vegalta Sendai	Kose Sports Park Stadium
JST (UTC+09)

11 November 2001 43	Vegalta Sendai	2–3 (g.g.)	Sagan Tosu	Sendai Stadium
JST (UTC+09)

18 November 2001 44	Kyoto Purple Sanga	0–1	Vegalta Sendai	Nishikyogoku Athletic Stadium
JST (UTC+09)

== Emperor's Cup ==
25 November 2001 First round	F.C. Primeiro	0–4	Vegalta Sendai	Fukushima Azuma Stadium
JST (UTC+09)

2 December 2001 Second round	Vegalta Sendai	4–1	FC Kyoken Kyoto	Sendai Stadium
JST (UTC+09)

9 December 2001 Third round	Sanfrecce Hiroshima	1–0	Vegalta Sendai	Hiroshima Stadium
JST (UTC+09)

== J.League Cup ==
4 April 2001 First round-1	Vegalta Sendai	1–2	Avispa Fukuoka	Sendai Stadium
JST (UTC+09)

18 April 2001 First round-2	Avispa Fukuoka	2–2 (4–3 agg.)	Vegalta Sendai	Hakatanomori Football Stadium
JST (UTC+09)

== Player statistics ==
No.	Pos.	Nat.	Player	D.o.B. (Age)	Height / Weight	J.League 2		Emperor's Cup		J.League Cup		Total	
No.	Pos.	Nat.	Player	D.o.B. (Age)	Height / Weight	Apps	Goals	Apps	Goals	Apps	Goals	Apps	Goals
1	GK	(Japan)	Norio Takahashi	March 15, 1971 (aged 29)	cm / kg	44	0						
2	DF	(Japan)	Susumu Watanabe	October 10, 1973 (aged 27)	cm / kg	36	3						
3	DF	(Japan)	Katsuyuki Saito	April 7, 1973 (aged 27)	cm / kg	0	0						
4	DF	(Japan)	Eiji Gaya	February 8, 1969 (aged 32)	cm / kg	26	0						
5	MF	(Brazil)	Celso Vieira	September 25, 1974 (aged 26)	cm / kg	31	0						
6	DF	(Brazil)	Ricardo	February 23, 1977 (aged 24)	cm / kg	33	1						
7	MF	(Japan)	Naoki Chiba	July 24, 1977 (aged 23)	cm / kg	38	1						
8	MF	(Japan)	Koji Nakajima	August 20, 1977 (aged 23)	cm / kg	0	0						
9	FW	(Brazil)	Marcos	March 21, 1974 (aged 26)	cm / kg	40	34						
10	MF	(Japan)	Nobuyuki Zaizen	October 19, 1976 (aged 24)	cm / kg	39	7						
11	FW	(Japan)	Shinji Fujiyoshi	April 3, 1970 (aged 30)	cm / kg	31	8						
13	MF	(Japan)	Tomohiro Hasumi	June 6, 1972 (aged 28)	cm / kg	31	2						
14	MF	(Japan)	Teruo Iwamoto	May 2, 1972 (aged 28)	cm / kg	34	5						
15	MF	(Japan)	Manabu Nakamura	June 26, 1977 (aged 23)	cm / kg	7	0						
16	FW	(Japan)	Makoto Segawa	November 26, 1974 (aged 26)	cm / kg	0	0						
17	DF	(Japan)	Kazuya Iio	April 10, 1980 (aged 20)	cm / kg	25	0						
18	DF	(Japan)	Yusuke Mori	July 24, 1980 (aged 20)	cm / kg	29	1						
19	FW	(Japan)	Shinya Mitsuoka	April 22, 1976 (aged 24)	cm / kg	21	3						
20	DF	(Japan)	Hiroyuki Tazawa	April 29, 1978 (aged 22)	cm / kg	0	0						
21	GK	(Japan)	Tatsuro Hagihara	August 6, 1982 (aged 18)	cm / kg	0	0						
22	GK	(Japan)	Taiki Maekawa	July 22, 1979 (aged 21)	cm / kg	0	0						
23	MF	(Japan)	Shin Nakamura	May 6, 1974 (aged 26)	cm / kg	42	2						
24	MF	(Japan)	Taichiro Saito	June 19, 1982 (aged 18)	cm / kg	0	0						
25	FW	(Japan)	Nozomu Kamma	April 27, 1978 (aged 22)	cm / kg	0	0						
26	MF	(Japan)	Kazuhiro Murakami	January 20, 1981 (aged 20)	cm / kg	4	0						
27	MF	(Japan)	Yasushi Kido	June 14, 1982 (aged 18)	cm / kg	0	0						
28	DF	(Japan)	Toshihiro Yahata	May 29, 1980 (aged 20)	cm / kg	2	0						
29	FW	(Japan)	Satoshi Ōtomo	October 1, 1981 (aged 19)	cm / kg	41	5						
30	DF	(Japan)	Tatsuya Murata	August 8, 1972 (aged 28)	cm / kg	27	0						
31	MF	(Japan)	Shuhei Hanabuchi	December 1, 1978 (aged 22)	cm / kg	0	0						
32	MF	(Japan)	Takahiro Yamada	April 29, 1972 (aged 28)	cm / kg	28	3						

== Other pages ==
- (in Japanese) J. League official site
