= 2001 J.League Division 2 =

J.League Division 2
- Season: 2001
- Champions: Kyoto Purple Sanga; 1st J2 title 1st D2 title
- Promoted: Kyoto Purple Sanga; Vegalta Sendai
- Matches: 264
- Goals: 760 (2.88 per match)
- Top goalscorer: Marcos (34 goals)
- Highest attendance: 42,011; Albirex Niigata 2-3 Kyoto Purple Sanga (3 November 2001)
- Lowest attendance: 754; Mito HollyHock 0-2 Omiya Ardija (23 May 2001)
- Total attendance: 1,505,722
- Average attendance: 5,703

Statistics of J.League Division 2 in the 2001 season.

== Overview ==
It was contested by 12 teams, and Kyoto Purple Sanga won the championship.

== Clubs ==
The following 12 clubs participated in J.League Division 2 during the 2001 season.

- Albirex Niigata
- Kawasaki Frontale
- Kyoto Purple Sanga
- Mito HollyHock
- Montedio Yamagata
- Oita Trinita
- Omiya Ardija
- Sagan Tosu
- Shonan Bellmare
- Vegalta Sendai
- Ventforet Kofu
- Yokohama FC

=== Personnel ===
Club	Head coach
Albirex Niigata	(Japan) Yasuharu Sorimachi
Kawasaki Frontale	(Japan) Nobuhiro Ishizaki
Kyoto Purple Sanga	(Germany) Gert Engels
Mito HollyHock	(Japan) Masaaki Kanno
Montedio Yamagata	(Japan) Koichi Hashiratani
Oita Trinita	(Japan) Shinji Kobayashi
Omiya Ardija	(Japan) Toshiya Miura
Sagan Tosu	(Japan) Kazuhiro Koso
Shonan Bellmare	(Japan) Koji Tanaka
Vegalta Sendai	(Japan) Hidehiko Shimizu
Ventforet Kofu	(Brazil) Luís dos Reis
Yokohama FC	(Japan) Katsuyoshi Shinto

=== Foreign players ===
Club	Player 1	Player 2	Player 3	Non-visa foreign	Type-C contract	Former players
Albirex Niigata	(Brazil) Andradina	(Brazil) Marquinho	(Brazil) Serjão			(Brazil) Lindomar
Kawasaki Frontale	(Brazil) Aílton	(Brazil) Edmilson			(Brazil) Luiz	(Brazil) Daniel Pitbull (Brazil) Emerson Sheik (Brazil) Ricardinho
Kyoto Purple Sanga	(Poland) Piotr Sowisz	(South Korea) An Hyo-yeon	(South Korea) Park Ji-sung			
Mito HollyHock	(South Korea) An Seon-jin	(South Korea) Sin Byung-ho		(North Korea) Hwang Hak-sun		
Montedio Yamagata						
Oita Trinita	(Belgium) Lorenzo Staelens	(Brazil) Bentinho	(Brazil) Gugu	(Brazil) Erikson Noguchipinto	(Brazil) Leandro Montebeler	(Poland) Andrzej Kubica (South Korea) Choi Moon-sik
Omiya Ardija	(Brazil) Alex Garcia	(Brazil) Toninho	(Panama) Jorge Dely Valdés		(Brazil) Baré	(Brazil) Jorginho (Panama) Alfredo Anderson
Sagan Tosu				(Ghana) Michael Yano		
Shonan Bellmare	(Colombia) Arley Dinas	(Colombia) Ever Palacios	(Colombia) Hernán Gaviria			(Colombia) James Angulo
Vegalta Sendai	(Brazil) Celso Vieira	(Brazil) Marcos	(Brazil) Ricardo	(Philippines) Satoshi Ōtomo		
Ventforet Kofu	(Brazil) Alex	(Brazil) Freitas	(Brazil) Vagner		(Brazil) Deili	(South Korea) Kim Hwang-jung
Yokohama FC						

== Final table ==
Pos	Team	Pld	W	OTW	D	OTL	L	GF	GA	GD	Pts	Promotion
1	Kyoto Purple Sanga (Note: Relegated from 2000 J.League Division 1) (C)	44	23	5	5	0	11	79	48	+31	84	Promoted to the 2002 J.League Division 1
2	Vegalta Sendai	44	24	3	5	3	9	78	56	+22	83	Promoted to the 2002 J.League Division 1
3	Montedio Yamagata	44	20	7	6	4	7	61	39	+22	80	
4	Albirex Niigata	44	22	4	4	7	7	79	47	+32	78	
5	Omiya Ardija	44	20	6	6	1	11	73	43	+30	78	
6	Oita Trinita	44	24	1	4	6	9	75	52	+23	78	
7	Kawasaki Frontale	44	17	3	3	4	17	69	60	+9	60	
8	Shonan Bellmare	44	16	4	4	2	18	64	61	+3	60	
9	Yokohama FC (Note: Promoted from 2000 JFL)	44	12	3	1	3	25	58	81	−23	43	
10	Sagan Tosu	44	8	2	4	2	28	45	82	−37	32	
11	Mito HollyHock	44	5	3	4	6	26	41	93	−52	25	
12	Ventforet Kofu	44	7	1	2	3	31	38	98	−60	25	

(C) Champion

== Attendances ==
#	Football club	Total attendance	Home games	Average	Highest	Lowest
1	Albirex Niigata	366,500	22	16,659	42,011	2,373
2	Vegalta Sendai	308,243	22	14,011	19,412	8,282
3	Oita Trinita	146,043	22	6,638	29,226	1,847
4	Montedio Yamagata	96,592	22	4,391	17,396	1,803
5	Shonan Bellmare	90,472	22	4,112	6,614	2,884
6	Omiya Ardija	85,014	22	3,864	7,038	1,665
7	Kyoto Purple Sanga	83,777	22	3,808	12,700	1,705
8	Kawasaki Frontale	83,240	22	3,784	8,126	1,169
9	Sagan Tosu	76,527	22	3,479	12,810	1,488
10	Ventforet Kofu	68,850	22	3,130	5,541	1,508
11	Yokohama FC	66,160	22	3,007	7,174	1,311
12	Mito HollyHock	34,304	22	1,559	3,472	754
