= Shin Nakamura =

Japanese footballer

Shin Nakamura 中村 伸
Personal information
- Full name: Shin Nakamura
- Date of birth: May 6, 1974 (age 52)
- Place of birth: Osaka, Japan
- Height: 1.70 m (5 ft 7 in)
- Position: Midfielder

Youth career
- 1990–1992: Tokai University Gyosei High School
- 1993–1996: Doshisha University

Senior career*
Years	Team	Apps	(Gls)
1997–2000	Sagan Tosu	118	(14)
2001–2002	Vegalta Sendai	45	(2)
Total		163	(16)
- * Club domestic league appearances and goals

Shin Nakamura (中村 伸, Nakamura Shin; born May 6, 1974) is a former Japanese football player. He is the current manager of WE League club of Sanfrecce Hiroshima Regina.

== Playing career ==
Nakamura was born in Osaka Prefecture on May 6, 1974. After graduating from Doshisha University, he joined Japan Football League club Sagan Tosu in 1997. He played as regular defensive midfielder from first season and the club was promoted to new league J2 League from 1999. In 2001, he moved to J2 club Vegalta Sendai. He played as regular defensive midfielder with Celso Vieira or Naoki Chiba in 2001. The club also won the 2nd place in 2001 and was promoted to J1 League from 2002. However the club gained many new player for 2002 season and he could hardly play in the match behind new member Hajime Moriyasu and Silvinho in 2002. He retired end of 2002 season.

== Career statistics ==
Appearances and goals by club, season and competition
Club	Season	League			Emperor's Cup		J.League Cup		Total	
Club	Season	Division	Apps	Goals	Apps	Goals	Apps	Goals	Apps	Goals
Sagan Tosu	1997	Football League	29	6	3	0	2	0	34	6
Sagan Tosu	1998	Football League	29	3	3	1	—		32	4
Sagan Tosu	1999	J2 League	33	5	3	0	1	0	37	5
Sagan Tosu	2000	J2 League	27	0	2	1	1	0	30	1
Vegalta Sendai	2001	J2 League	42	2	2	0	2	0	46	2
Vegalta Sendai	2002	J1 League	3	0	0	0	0	0	3	0
Career total			163	16	13	2	6	0	182	18
