= 2004 Vegalta Sendai season =

Vegalta Sendai
2004 season
- Chairman: Nagawa Yoshitaka
- Manager: Satoshi Tsunami
- Stadium: Sendai Stadium
- J2 League: 4th
- Emperor's Cup: 4th round
- Top goalscorer: League: Hisato Satō; All: Hisato Satō
Home colours	Away colours

During the 2004 season, Vegalta Sendai competed in the J2 League, the second tier of Japanese football, in which they finished 4th. The club also competed in the Emperor's Cup and were eliminated in the fourth round.

== Competitions ==
Competitions	Position
J. League 2	6th / 12 clubs
Emperor's Cup	4th Round

== Domestic results ==
=== J. League 2 ===
Match	Date	Venue	Opponents	Score
1	2004..	[[]]	[[]]	-
2	2004..	[[]]	[[]]	-
3	2004..	[[]]	[[]]	-
4	2004..	[[]]	[[]]	-
5	2004..	[[]]	[[]]	-
6	2004..	[[]]	[[]]	-
7	2004..	[[]]	[[]]	-
8	2004..	[[]]	[[]]	-
9	2004..	[[]]	[[]]	-
10	2004..	[[]]	[[]]	-
11	2004..	[[]]	[[]]	-
12	2004..	[[]]	[[]]	-
13	2004..	[[]]	[[]]	-
14	2004..	[[]]	[[]]	-
15	2004..	[[]]	[[]]	-
16	2004..	[[]]	[[]]	-
17	2004..	[[]]	[[]]	-
18	2004..	[[]]	[[]]	-
19	2004..	[[]]	[[]]	-
20	2004..	[[]]	[[]]	-
21	2004..	[[]]	[[]]	-
22	2004..	[[]]	[[]]	-
23	2004..	[[]]	[[]]	-
24	2004..	[[]]	[[]]	-
25	2004..	[[]]	[[]]	-
26	2004..	[[]]	[[]]	-
27	2004..	[[]]	[[]]	-
28	2004..	[[]]	[[]]	-
29	2004..	[[]]	[[]]	-
30	2004..	[[]]	[[]]	-
31	2004..	[[]]	[[]]	-
32	2004..	[[]]	[[]]	-
33	2004..	[[]]	[[]]	-
34	2004..	[[]]	[[]]	-
35	2004..	[[]]	[[]]	-
36	2004..	[[]]	[[]]	-
37	2004..	[[]]	[[]]	-
38	2004..	[[]]	[[]]	-
39	2004..	[[]]	[[]]	-
40	2004..	[[]]	[[]]	-
41	2004..	[[]]	[[]]	-
42	2004..	[[]]	[[]]	-
43	2004..	[[]]	[[]]	-
44	2004..	[[]]	[[]]	-

=== Emperor's Cup ===
Match	Date	Venue	Opponents	Score
3rd Round	2004..	[[]]	[[]]	-
4th Round	2004..	[[]]	[[]]	-

== Player statistics ==
No.	Pos.	Player	D.o.B. (Age)	Height / Weight	J. League 2		Emperor's Cup		Total	
No.	Pos.	Player	D.o.B. (Age)	Height / Weight	Apps	Goals	Apps	Goals	Apps	Goals
1	GK	Kiyomitsu Kobari	June 12, 1977 (aged 26)	cm / kg	-	-				
2	DF	Susumu Watanabe	October 10, 1973 (aged 30)	cm / kg	-	-				
3	DF	Masahiro Kazuma	June 22, 1982 (aged 21)	cm / kg	-	-				
4	DF	Shogo Kobara	November 2, 1982 (aged 21)	cm / kg	-	-				
5	DF	Jozef Gašpar	August 23, 1977 (aged 26)	cm / kg	-	-				
5	DF	Goce Sedloski	April 10, 1974 (aged 29)	cm / kg	-	-				
6	MF	Toshiya Ishii	January 19, 1978 (aged 26)	cm / kg	-	-				
7	MF	Naoki Chiba	July 24, 1977 (aged 26)	cm / kg	-	-				
8	MF	Silvinho	January 17, 1977 (aged 27)	cm / kg	-	-				
9	FW	Marcos	March 21, 1974 (aged 29)	cm / kg	-	-				
9	FW	Fábio Nunes	January 15, 1980 (aged 24)	cm / kg	-	-				
10	MF	Nobuyuki Zaizen	October 19, 1976 (aged 27)	cm / kg	-	-				
11	FW	Hisato Satō	March 12, 1982 (aged 22)	cm / kg	-	-				
13	MF	Masaya Nishitani	September 16, 1978 (aged 25)	cm / kg	-	-				
14	DF	Yosuke Nakata	September 15, 1981 (aged 22)	cm / kg	-	-				
15	DF	Tatsuya Murata	August 8, 1972 (aged 31)	cm / kg	-	-				
16	GK	Koichiro Morita	October 28, 1984 (aged 19)	cm / kg	-	-				
17	MF	Masato Harasaki	August 13, 1974 (aged 29)	cm / kg	-	-				
18	FW	Hiroki Bandai	February 19, 1986 (aged 18)	cm / kg	-	-				
19	DF	Takumi Morikawa	July 11, 1977 (aged 26)	cm / kg	-	-				
20	MF	Kunimitsu Sekiguchi	December 26, 1985 (aged 18)	cm / kg	-	-				
21	GK	Tatsuro Hagihara	August 6, 1982 (aged 21)	cm / kg	-	-				
22	GK	Daijiro Takakuwa	August 10, 1973 (aged 30)	cm / kg	-	-				
23	MF	Yosuke Nishi	May 12, 1983 (aged 20)	cm / kg	-	-				
24	FW	Katsutomo Oshiba	May 10, 1973 (aged 30)	cm / kg	-	-				
25	MF	Naoki Sugai	September 21, 1984 (aged 19)	cm / kg	-	-				
26	MF	Kazuhiro Murakami	January 20, 1981 (aged 23)	cm / kg	-	-				
27	DF	Hideki Okochi	August 9, 1985 (aged 18)	cm / kg	-	-				
28	MF	Ryuji Akiba	June 13, 1984 (aged 19)	cm / kg	-	-				
29	FW	Takayuki Nakahara	November 18, 1984 (aged 19)	cm / kg	-	-				
30	MF	Ryang Yong-Gi	January 7, 1982 (aged 22)	cm / kg	-	-				
31	DF	Masatoshi Higuchi	August 10, 1985 (aged 18)	cm / kg	-	-				
32	DF	Kensuke Nebiki	September 7, 1977 (aged 26)	cm / kg	-	-				
33	MF	Koji Kumagai	October 23, 1975 (aged 28)	cm / kg	-	-				

== Other pages ==
- (in Japanese) J. League official site
