= 2003 Vegalta Sendai season =

Vegalta Sendai
2003 season
- Chairman: Kyogoku Akira
- Manager: Hidehiko Shimizu; Hajime Ishii (preliminary); Zdenko Verdenik
- Stadium: Sendai Stadium
- J. League 1: 15th (↓J2)
- J.League Cup: GL-B 3rd
- Emperor's Cup: 3rd Round
- Top goalscorer: Hisato Sato (9)
Home colours	Away colours

2003 Vegalta Sendai season.

== Competitions ==
Competitions	Position
J. League 1	15th / 16 clubs
Emperor's Cup	3rd Round
J. League Cup	GL-B 3rd / 4 clubs

== Domestic results ==
=== J. League 1 ===
Match	Date	Venue	Opponents	Score
1-1	2003.3.23	Sendai Stadium	Oita Trinita	1-0
1-2	2003.4.5	International Stadium Yokohama	Yokohama F. Marinos	1-1
1-3	2003.4.13	Sendai Stadium	Shimizu S-Pulse	3-1
1-4	2003.4.19	Kobe Wing Stadium	Vissel Kobe	2-1
1-5	2003.4.26	Sendai Stadium	Gamba Osaka	0-2
1-6	2003.4.29	Miyagi Stadium	Júbilo Iwata	1-1
1-7	2003.5.5	Nishikyogoku Athletic Stadium	Kyoto Purple Sanga	0-1
1-8	2003.5.10	Sendai Stadium	Cerezo Osaka	1-2
1-9	2003.5.18	Toyota Stadium	Nagoya Grampus Eight	1-2
1-10	2003.5.24	Miyagi Stadium	Kashima Antlers	0-2
1-11	2003.7.6	Ajinomoto Stadium	F.C. Tokyo	0-2
1-12	2003.7.12	Ichihara Seaside Stadium	JEF United Ichihara	1-5
1-13	2003.7.19	Sendai Stadium	Tokyo Verdy 1969	3-3
1-14	2003.7.26	Saitama Stadium 2002	Urawa Red Diamonds	2-3
1-15	2003.8.2	Sendai Stadium	Kashiwa Reysol	1-2
2-1	2003.8.16	Nihondaira Sports Stadium	Shimizu S-Pulse	2-2
2-2	2003.8.24	Sendai Stadium	Vissel Kobe	1-1
2-3	2003.8.30	Nagai Stadium	Cerezo Osaka	2-4
2-4	2003.9.6	Sendai Stadium	Nagoya Grampus Eight	0-3
2-5	2003.9.13	Kashima Soccer Stadium	Kashima Antlers	0-0
2-6	2003.9.20	Sendai Stadium	F.C. Tokyo	2-2
2-7	2003.9.23	Kashiwa no Ha Park Stadium	Kashiwa Reysol	0-1
2-8	2003.9.27	Miyagi Stadium	Urawa Red Diamonds	1-6
2-9	2003.10.4	Ishikawa Athletics Stadium	Gamba Osaka	1-0
2-10	2003.10.18	Sendai Stadium	JEF United Ichihara	1-2
2-11	2003.10.25	Ajinomoto Stadium	Tokyo Verdy 1969	0-0
2-12	2003.11.8	Yamaha Stadium	Júbilo Iwata	0-1
2-13	2003.11.16	Sendai Stadium	Kyoto Purple Sanga	3-1
2-14	2003.11.22	Sendai Stadium	Yokohama F. Marinos	0-4
2-15	2003.11.29	Ōita Stadium	Oita Trinita	1-1

=== Emperor's Cup ===
Match	Date	Venue	Opponents	Score
3rd Round	2003..	[[]]	[[]]	-

=== J. League Cup ===
Match	Date	Venue	Opponents	Score
GL-B-1	2003..	[[]]	[[]]	-
GL-B-2	2003..	[[]]	[[]]	-
GL-B-3	2003..	[[]]	[[]]	-
GL-B-4	2003..	[[]]	[[]]	-
GL-B-5	2003..	[[]]	[[]]	-
GL-B-6	2003..	[[]]	[[]]	-

== Player statistics ==
No.	Pos.	Player	D.o.B. (Age)	Height / Weight	J. League 1		Emperor's Cup		J. League Cup		Total	
No.	Pos.	Player	D.o.B. (Age)	Height / Weight	Apps	Goals	Apps	Goals	Apps	Goals	Apps	Goals
1	GK	Kiyomitsu Kobari	June 12, 1977 (aged 25)	cm / kg	20	0						
2	DF	Susumu Watanabe	October 10, 1973 (aged 29)	cm / kg	13	0						
3	DF	Ichizo Nakata	April 19, 1973 (aged 29)	cm / kg	6	0						
4	DF	Norio Omura	September 6, 1969 (aged 33)	cm / kg	20	0						
5	DF	Fabiano	August 4, 1975 (aged 27)	cm / kg	23	1						
6	MF	Toshiyuki Abe	August 1, 1974 (aged 28)	cm / kg	15	1						
7	MF	Naoki Chiba	July 24, 1977 (aged 25)	cm / kg	8	0						
8	MF	Silvinho	January 17, 1977 (aged 26)	cm / kg	26	1						
9	FW	Marcos	March 21, 1974 (aged 28)	cm / kg	3	3						
9	FW	Kim Eun-Jung	April 8, 1979 (aged 23)	cm / kg	10	2						
10	MF	Nobuyuki Zaizen	October 19, 1976 (aged 26)	cm / kg	8	0						
11	FW	Hisato Satō	March 12, 1982 (aged 20)	cm / kg	30	9						
13	FW	Yoshiteru Yamashita	November 21, 1977 (aged 25)	cm / kg	29	4						
14	MF	Teruo Iwamoto	May 2, 1972 (aged 30)	cm / kg	26	5						
15	MF	Toshiya Ishii	January 19, 1978 (aged 25)	cm / kg	26	0						
16	GK	Koichiro Morita	October 28, 1984 (aged 18)	cm / kg	0	0						
17	DF	Yuichi Nemoto	July 21, 1981 (aged 21)	cm / kg	28	2						
18	DF	Yuki Yamauchi	May 10, 1982 (aged 20)	cm / kg	0	0						
19	DF	Takumi Morikawa	July 11, 1977 (aged 25)	cm / kg	13	0						
20	MF	Yasushi Fukunaga	March 6, 1973 (aged 30)	cm / kg	7	0						
21	GK	Tatsuro Hagihara	August 6, 1982 (aged 20)	cm / kg	0	0						
22	GK	Daijiro Takakuwa	August 10, 1973 (aged 29)	cm / kg	11	0						
23	MF	Yosuke Nishi	May 12, 1983 (aged 19)	cm / kg	0	0						
24	DF	Masahiro Kazuma	June 22, 1982 (aged 20)	cm / kg	6	0						
25	MF	Naoki Sugai	September 21, 1984 (aged 18)	cm / kg	0	0						
26	MF	Kazuhiro Murakami	January 20, 1981 (aged 22)	cm / kg	13	0						
27	MF	Hajime Moriyasu	August 23, 1968 (aged 34)	cm / kg	18	0						
28	DF	Toshihiro Yahata	May 29, 1980 (aged 22)	cm / kg	2	0						
29	FW	Takayuki Nakahara	November 18, 1984 (aged 18)	cm / kg	4	0						
30	DF	Tatsuya Murata	August 8, 1972 (aged 30)	cm / kg	0	0						
30	FW	Doda	October 29, 1984 (aged 18)	cm / kg	0	0						
31	FW	Éder Ceccon	April 13, 1983 (aged 19)	cm / kg	5	1						
31	DF	Takayuki Komine	April 25, 1974 (aged 28)	cm / kg	8	0						
32	MF	Takahiro Yamada	April 29, 1972 (aged 30)	cm / kg	0	0						
32	DF	Takumi Hayama	May 20, 1978 (aged 24)	cm / kg	0	0						
33	DF	Takehito Suzuki	June 11, 1971 (aged 31)	cm / kg	0	0						
33	MF	Shigeyoshi Mochizuki	July 9, 1973 (aged 29)	cm / kg	14	1						
34	DF	Marquen	November 30, 1983 (aged 19)	cm / kg	0	0						
34	FW	Kenji Fukuda	October 21, 1977 (aged 25)	cm / kg	10	0						

== Other pages ==
- (in Japanese) J. League official site
