= 2000 Vegalta Sendai season =

Vegalta Sendai
2000 season
- Chairman: Kyogoku Akira
- Manager: Hidehiko Shimizu
- Stadium: Sendai Stadium
- J2 League: 5th
- J.League Cup: 1st Round
- Emperor's Cup: 1st Round
- Top goalscorer: Shinji Fujiyoshi (10); Satoshi Otomo (10)
Home colours	Away colours

2000 Vegalta Sendai season

== Competitions ==
Competitions	Position
J. League 2	5th / 11 clubs
Emperor's Cup	1st round
J.League Cup	1st round

== J.League 2 ==
=== League table ===
Pos	Team	Pld	W	OTW	D	OTL	L	GF	GA	GD	Pts
3	Oita Trinita	40	26	0	3	3	8	80	38	+42	81
4	Omiya Ardija	40	21	2	1	2	14	55	49	+6	68
5	Vegalta Sendai	40	15	4	2	4	15	60	69	−9	55
6	Sagan Tosu	40	13	2	5	5	15	41	52	−11	48
7	Albirex Niigata	40	11	4	5	2	18	54	63	−9	46

=== Results ===
12 March 2000 1	Shonan Bellmare	4–1	Vegalta Sendai	Hiratsuka Athletics Stadium
JST (UTC+09)

19 March 2000 2	Omiya Ardija	2–1	Vegalta Sendai	Omiya Football Stadium
JST (UTC+09)

26 March 2000 3	Vegalta Sendai	0–1 (g.g.)	Sagan Tosu	Sendai Stadium
JST (UTC+09)

30 March 2000 4	Ventforet Kofu	1–0	Vegalta Sendai	Kose Sports Park Stadium
JST (UTC+09)

2 April 2000 5	Vegalta Sendai	1–2	Consadole Sapporo	Sendai Stadium
JST (UTC+09)

9 April 2000 6	Albirex Niigata	1–3	Vegalta Sendai	Niigata City Athletic Stadium
JST (UTC+09)

7	bye

23 April 2000 8	Vegalta Sendai	2–3 (g.g.)	Urawa Red Diamonds	Sendai Stadium
JST (UTC+09)

29 April 2000 9	Oita Trinita	4–1	Vegalta Sendai	Saiki Stadium
JST (UTC+09)

4 May 2000 10	Vegalta Sendai	2–1	Montedio Yamagata	Sendai Stadium
JST (UTC+09)

7 May 2000 11	Mito HollyHock	0–0 (g.g.)	Vegalta Sendai	Hitachinaka City Stadium
JST (UTC+09)

14 May 2000 12	Vegalta Sendai	3–2	Shonan Bellmare	Sendai Stadium
JST (UTC+09)

18 May 2000 13	Vegalta Sendai	1–2 (g.g.)	Omiya Ardija	Sendai Stadium
JST (UTC+09)

21 May 2000 14	Sagan Tosu	1–2	Vegalta Sendai	Tosu Stadium
JST (UTC+09)

28 May 2000 15	Vegalta Sendai	3–1	Ventforet Kofu	Sendai Stadium
JST (UTC+09)

1 June 2000 16	Consadole Sapporo	3–1	Vegalta Sendai	Sapporo Atsubetsu Park Stadium
JST (UTC+09)

4 June 2000 17	Vegalta Sendai	4–2	Albirex Niigata	Sendai Stadium
JST (UTC+09)

18	bye

17 June 2000 19	Urawa Red Diamonds	4–2	Vegalta Sendai	Urawa Komaba Stadium
JST (UTC+09)

21 June 2000 20	Vegalta Sendai	1–0	Oita Trinita	Sendai Stadium
JST (UTC+09)

25 June 2000 21	Montedio Yamagata	0–1	Vegalta Sendai	Yamagata Park Stadium
JST (UTC+09)

1 July 2000 22	Vegalta Sendai	1–0	Mito HollyHock	Sendai Stadium
JST (UTC+09)

8 July 2000 23	Ventforet Kofu	1–2	Vegalta Sendai	Kose Sports Park Stadium
JST (UTC+09)

22 July 2000 24	Vegalta Sendai	0–2	Consadole Sapporo	Sendai Stadium
JST (UTC+09)

29 July 2000 25	Albirex Niigata	0–2	Vegalta Sendai	Niigata City Athletic Stadium
JST (UTC+09)

26	bye

5 August 2000 27	Vegalta Sendai	1–1 (g.g.)	Urawa Red Diamonds	Sendai Stadium
JST (UTC+09)

12 August 2000 28	Oita Trinita	5–0	Vegalta Sendai	Oita Athletic Stadium
JST (UTC+09)

19 August 2000 29	Vegalta Sendai	2–1 (g.g.)	Montedio Yamagata	Sendai Stadium
JST (UTC+09)

27 August 2000 30	Mito HollyHock	1–5	Vegalta Sendai	Hitachi Athletic Stadium
JST (UTC+09)

3 September 2000 31	Vegalta Sendai	2–6	Shonan Bellmare	Sendai Stadium
JST (UTC+09)

9 September 2000 32	Omiya Ardija	2–3 (g.g.)	Vegalta Sendai	Omiya Football Stadium
JST (UTC+09)

15 September 2000 33	Vegalta Sendai	0–1	Sagan Tosu	Sendai Stadium
JST (UTC+09)

24 September 2000 34	Consadole Sapporo	1–0	Vegalta Sendai	Sapporo Atsubetsu Park Stadium
JST (UTC+09)

28 September 2000 35	Vegalta Sendai	2–1	Albirex Niigata	Sendai Stadium
JST (UTC+09)

36	bye

7 October 2000 37	Urawa Red Diamonds	1–0 (g.g.)	Vegalta Sendai	Urawa Komaba Stadium
JST (UTC+09)

15 October 2000 38	Vegalta Sendai	0–3	Oita Trinita	Sendai Stadium
JST (UTC+09)

22 October 2000 39	Montedio Yamagata	1–2	Vegalta Sendai	Yamagata Park Stadium
JST (UTC+09)

29 October 2000 40	Vegalta Sendai	2–0	Mito HollyHock	Sendai Stadium
JST (UTC+09)

5 November 2000 41	Shonan Bellmare	3–4 (g.g.)	Vegalta Sendai	Hiratsuka Athletics Stadium
JST (UTC+09)

12 November 2000 42	Vegalta Sendai	0–2	Omiya Ardija	Sendai Stadium
JST (UTC+09)

16 November 2000 43	Sagan Tosu	2–3 (g.g.)	Vegalta Sendai	Tosu Stadium
JST (UTC+09)

19 November 2000 44	Vegalta Sendai	0–1	Ventforet Kofu	Sendai Stadium
JST (UTC+09)

== Emperor's Cup ==
25 November 2000 1st Round	Kwansei Gakuin University	2–1	Vegalta Sendai	Himeji Athletic Stadium
JST (UTC+09)

== J.League Cup ==
12 April 2000 1st Round-1	Cerezo Osaka	2–0	Vegalta Sendai	Osaka Nagai Second Stadium
JST (UTC+09)

19 April 2000 1st Round-2	Vegalta Sendai	0–1 (0–3 agg.)	Cerezo Osaka	Sendai Stadium
JST (UTC+09)

== Player statistics ==
No.	Pos.	Nat.	Player	D.o.B. (Age)	Height / Weight	J.League 2		Emperor's Cup		J.League Cup		Total	
No.	Pos.	Nat.	Player	D.o.B. (Age)	Height / Weight	Apps	Goals	Apps	Goals	Apps	Goals	Apps	Goals
1	GK	(Japan)	Norio Takahashi	March 15, 1971 (aged 28)	cm / kg	34	0						
2	DF	(Japan)	Yoshihito Yamaji	January 13, 1971 (aged 29)	cm / kg	6	0						
3	DF	(Japan)	Katsuyuki Saito	April 7, 1973 (aged 26)	cm / kg	10	0						
4	DF	(Japan)	Eiji Gaya	February 8, 1969 (aged 31)	cm / kg	38	2						
5	DF	(Serbia and Montenegro)	Slobodan Dubajić	February 19, 1966 (aged 34)	cm / kg	31	3						
6	DF	(Brazil)	Ricardo	February 23, 1977 (aged 23)	cm / kg	36	2						
7	MF	(Japan)	Naoki Chiba	July 24, 1977 (aged 22)	cm / kg	39	2						
8	MF	(Japan)	Koji Nakajima	August 20, 1977 (aged 22)	cm / kg	19	0						
9	FW	(Brazil)	Rodrigo	January 11, 1979 (aged 21)	cm / kg	5	0						
10	MF	(Japan)	Nobuyuki Zaizen	October 19, 1976 (aged 23)	cm / kg	20	2						
11	FW	(Japan)	Shinji Fujiyoshi	April 3, 1970 (aged 29)	cm / kg	39	10						
13	MF	(Japan)	Tomohiro Hasumi	June 6, 1972 (aged 27)	cm / kg	38	9						
14	MF	(Japan)	Suguru Ito	September 7, 1975 (aged 24)	cm / kg	24	6						
15	MF	(Japan)	Manabu Nakamura	June 26, 1977 (aged 22)	cm / kg	2	0						
16	FW	(Japan)	Makoto Segawa	November 26, 1974 (aged 25)	cm / kg	3	0						
17	DF	(Japan)	Kazuya Iio	April 10, 1980 (aged 19)	cm / kg	35	0						
18	DF	(Japan)	Kei Mikuriya	August 29, 1977 (aged 22)	cm / kg	4	0						
19	FW	(Japan)	Yasutaka Kobayashi	June 15, 1980 (aged 19)	cm / kg	37	6						
20	DF	(Japan)	Hiroyuki Tazawa	April 29, 1978 (aged 21)	cm / kg	28	1						
21	GK	(Japan)	Kei Sakurai	June 30, 1977 (aged 22)	cm / kg	0	0						
22	GK	(Japan)	Ken Ishikawa	February 6, 1970 (aged 30)	cm / kg	6	0						
23	FW	(Japan)	Seiki Aizawa	September 19, 1980 (aged 19)	cm / kg	0	0						
24	DF	(Japan)	Eiki Onodera	May 22, 1980 (aged 19)	cm / kg	0	0						
25	DF	(Japan)	Satoshi Sayama	May 27, 1980 (aged 19)	cm / kg	0	0						
26	MF	(Japan)	Motoki Imagawa	May 17, 1980 (aged 19)	cm / kg	0	0						
27	DF	(Japan)	Hiroaki Tsujikami	August 31, 1976 (aged 23)	cm / kg	0	0						
28	DF	(Japan)	Toshihiro Yahata	May 29, 1980 (aged 19)	cm / kg	4	0						
29	FW	(Japan)	Satoshi Ōtomo	October 1, 1981 (aged 18)	cm / kg	36	10						
30	MF	(Japan)	Tomokazu Hirama	June 30, 1977 (aged 22)	cm / kg	35	7						
31	FW	(Japan)	Shunsuke Nonaka	May 12, 1977 (aged 22)	cm / kg	0	0						
32	MF	(Japan)	Takahiro Yamada	April 29, 1972 (aged 27)	cm / kg	19	0						
