= Takahiro Yamada (footballer) =

Japanese footballer

Takahiro Yamada 山田 隆裕
Personal information
- Full name: Takahiro Yamada
- Date of birth: April 29, 1972 (age 54)
- Place of birth: Takatsuki, Osaka, Japan
- Height: 1.75 m (5 ft 9 in)
- Position: Midfielder

Youth career
- 1988–1990: Shimizu Commercial High School

Senior career*
Years	Team	Apps	(Gls)
1991–1997	Yokohama Marinos	159	(18)
1998	Kyoto Purple Sanga	29	(1)
1999	Verdy Kawasaki	27	(1)
2000–2003	Vegalta Sendai	65	(3)
Total		280	(23)

International career
1994	Japan	1	(0)
Medal record
Yokohama Marinos
Runner-up	Japan Soccer League	1991/92
Winner	J1 League	1995
Winner	Emperor's Cup	1991
Winner	Emperor's Cup	1992
Representing Japan
AFC Asian Cup
Gold medal – first place	1992 Japan
- * Club domestic league appearances and goals

Takahiro Yamada (山田 隆裕, Yamada Takahiro; born April 29, 1972) is a former Japanese football player. He played for Japan national team.

== Club career ==
Yamada was educated at and played for Shimizu Commercial High School. At the high school, he won the national high school championship and the national youth championship with his team mates including Hiroshi Nanami, Go Oiwa and Shigeyoshi Mochizuki. Some scouts regarded him as the No. 1 high school player of his age.

After graduating in 1990, he joined Japan Soccer League side Nissan Motors where his powerful dribbling helped him quickly establish himself as a regular. When Japan's first-ever professional league J1 League started in 1992, Nissan Motors was transformed to Yokohama Marinos for whom he continued to play.

He moved to Kyoto Purple Sanga in 1998, and then to Verdy Kawasaki in 1999. He announced the retirement from the game after the 1999 season at the age of 29. However, Hidehiko Shimizu, the manager of J2 League side Vegalta Sendai, who had also managed Yamada at Yokohama Marinos, successfully persuaded him to come out of the retirement and help Sendai to gain the promotion to J1 League. Yamada played for Sendai for 3 years from June 2000 to June 2003 before finally hanging up his boots. He was the leader and the influential player for Sendai who were promoted to J1 League for the 2002 season.

== National team career ==
Yamada was capped once for the Japan national team when he played in a friendly against Australia on September 27, 1994 at the Tokyo National Stadium. He was a member of the Japan team that won the 1992 Asian Cup but did not play in the tournament.

== After retirement ==
After retiring from the game, Yamada started his own business, a franchise chain of bakeries specialising in melonpans, in Sendai. After exiting the business, he now runs an Irish pub in downtown Tokyo as of July 2018.

== Club statistics ==
Club performance			League		Cup		League Cup		Total	
Season	Club	League	Apps	Goals	Apps	Goals	Apps	Goals	Apps	Goals
Japan			League		Emperor's Cup		J.League Cup		Total	
1990/91	Nissan Motors	JSL Division 1	0	0	0	0	0	0	0	0
1991/92	Nissan Motors	JSL Division 1	9	0			1	0	10	0
1992	Yokohama Marinos	J1 League	-		0	0	9	1	9	1
1993	Yokohama Marinos	J1 League	27	3	3	0	1	1	31	4
1994	Yokohama Marinos	J1 League	32	1	1	0	3	1	36	2
1995	Yokohama Marinos	J1 League	43	7	1	0	-		44	7
1996	Yokohama Marinos	J1 League	23	1	0	0	9	2	32	3
1997	Yokohama Marinos	J1 League	25	6	0	0	5	0	30	6
1998	Kyoto Purple Sanga	J1 League	29	1	1	0	0	0	30	1
1999	Verdy Kawasaki	J1 League	27	1	3	0	2	0	32	1
2000	Vegalta Sendai	J2 League	19	0	1	1	0	0	20	1
2001	Vegalta Sendai	J2 League	28	3	3	0	2	0	33	3
2002	Vegalta Sendai	J1 League	18	0	2	0	2	0	22	0
2003	Vegalta Sendai	J1 League	0	0	0	0	1	0	1	0
Total			280	23	15	1	35	5	330	29

== National team statistics ==
Japan national team
Year	Apps	Goals
1994	1	0
Total	1	0

== Honors and awards ==
=== Team honours ===
- 1992 Asian Cup (Champions)
