= Masahiro Kazuma =

Japanese footballer

Masahiro Kazuma 數馬 正浩
Personal information
- Full name: Masahiro Kazuma
- Date of birth: June 22, 1982 (age 44)
- Place of birth: Kanagawa, Japan
- Height: 1.80 m (5 ft 11 in)
- Position: Defender

Youth career
- 1998–2000: Yokohama F. Marinos

Senior career*
Years	Team	Apps	(Gls)
2001–2002	Yokohama F. Marinos	11	(1)
2002–2004	Vegalta Sendai	11	(0)
2005–2008	Japan Soccer College		
Total		22	(1)
Medal record
Yokohama F. Marinos
Runner-up	J1 League	2002
Winner	J.League Cup	2001
- * Club domestic league appearances and goals

Masahiro Kazuma (數馬 正浩, Kazuma Masahiro; born June 22, 1982) is a former Japanese football player.

== Playing career ==
Kazuma was born in Kanagawa Prefecture on June 22, 1982. He joined the J1 League club Yokohama F. Marinos youth team in 2001. He played many matches as a center back during the first season. However he did not play in 2002. In September 2002, he moved to the J1 club Vegalta Sendai. However he did not play much and the club was relegated to the J2 League in 2004. In 2005, he moved to the Regional Leagues club Japan Soccer College. He played often as a regular player. He retired at the end of the 2008 season.

== Career statistics ==
Appearances and goals by club, season and competition
Club	Season	League			Emperor's Cup		J.League Cup		Total	
Club	Season	Division	Apps	Goals	Apps	Goals	Apps	Goals	Apps	Goals
Yokohama F. Marinos	2001	J1 League	10	1	0	0	4	1	14	2
Yokohama F. Marinos	2002	J1 League	1	0	0	0	3	0	4	0
Vegalta Sendai	2002	J1 League	2	0	2	0	0	0	4	0
Vegalta Sendai	2003	J1 League	6	0	1	0	1	0	8	0
Vegalta Sendai	2004	J2 League	3	0	0	0	—		3	0
Japan Soccer College	2005	Regional Leagues								
Japan Soccer College	2006	Regional Leagues	13	2	1	0	—		14	2
Japan Soccer College	2007	Regional Leagues	11	4	2	0	—		13	4
Japan Soccer College	2008	Regional Leagues	13	1	—		—		13	1
Career total			59	8	6	0	8	1	73	9
