= Fábio Nunes =

Fábio Nunes may refer to:

- Fábio Nunes (Brazilian footballer) (born 1980), Brazilian footballer
- Fábio Nunes (Portuguese footballer) (born 1992), Portuguese footballer
