= Susumu Watanabe =

Japanese footballer and manager

Susumu Watanabe 渡邉 晋
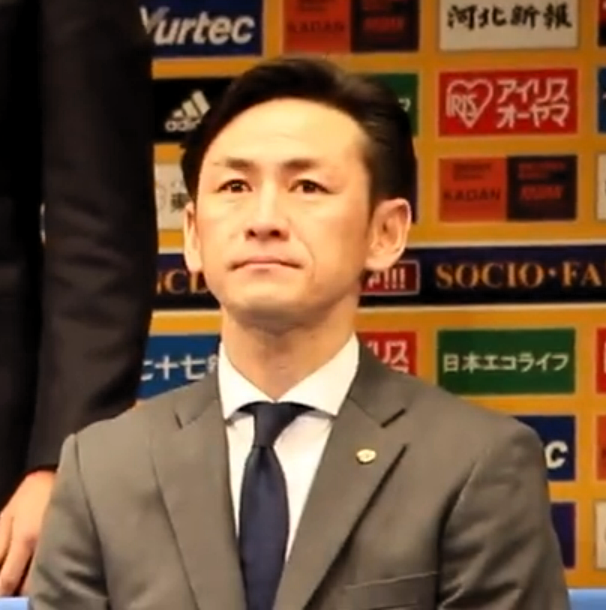

Personal information
- Full name: Susumu Watanabe
- Date of birth: October 10, 1973 (age 53)
- Place of birth: Hinode, Tokyo, Japan
- Height: 1.84 m (6 ft 0 in)
- Position: Defender

Youth career
- 1989–1991: Toin Gakuen High School

College career
Years	Team	Apps	(Gls)
1992–1995	Komazawa University		

Senior career*
Years	Team	Apps	(Gls)
1996	Consadole Sapporo	8	(1)
1997–2000	Ventforet Kofu	120	(23)
2001–2004	Vegalta Sendai	53	(3)
Total		181	(27)

Managerial career
- 2014–2019: Vegalta Sendai
- 2021: Renofa Yamaguchi
- 2023–: Montedio Yamagata
- * Club domestic league appearances and goals

Susumu Watanabe (渡邉 晋, Watanabe Susumu; born October 10, 1973) is a Japanese professional football manager and former player who most recent as the manager of J2 League club Montedio Yamagata.

== Playing career ==
Watanabe was born in Hinode, Tokyo on October 10, 1973. After graduating from Komazawa University, he joined Japan Football League (JFL) club Consadole Sapporo in 1996. However he could not play many matches. In 1997, he moved to JFL club Ventforet Kofu. He became a regular player as center back from first season and the club was promoted to new league J2 League from 1999. Although he played as regular player, the club finished at bottom place for 2 years in a row (1999-2000). In 2001, he moved to J2 club Vegalta Sendai. He played many matches as regular center back with Ricardo and the club won the 2nd place and was promoted to J1 League from 2002. However the club gained Norio Omura and Watanabe could hardly play in the match behind Omura in 2002. Although he played many matches instead Omura in late 2003, the club was relegated to J2 from 2004. He could hardly play in the match in 2004 and retired at the end of the 2004 season.

== Coaching career ==
=== Vegalta Sendai ===
After retirement, Watanabe started coaching career at Vegalta Sendai in 2005. In 2008, he became a top team coach. In April 2014, the club results were bad and manager Graham Arnold was sacked when the club was at the 17th place of 18 clubs. Watanabe became a new manager as Arnold successor. Vegalta finished at the 14 the place in 2014 season and remained in J1. Vegalta won the runners-up in 2018 Emperor's Cup.

=== Renofa Yamaguchi ===
In 2021, he signed with J2 League club Renofa Yamaguchi FC.

=== Montedio Yamagata ===
In 2022, he signed a contract with J2 League club Montedio Yamagata as a coach. In April 2023, following the dismissal of Peter Cklamovski, Watanabe was appointed as manager of the club.

== Career statistics ==
Appearances and goals by club, season and competition
Club	Season	League			Emperor's Cup		J.League Cup		Total	
Club	Season	Division	Apps	Goals	Apps	Goals	Apps	Goals	Apps	Goals
Consadole Sapporo	1996	Football League	8	1	0	0	-		8	1
Ventforet Kofu	1997	Football League	22	8	3	1	-		25	9
Ventforet Kofu	1998	Football League	25	10	4	2	-		29	12
Ventforet Kofu	1999	J2 League	35	2	2	0	2	0	39	2
Ventforet Kofu	2000	J2 League	38	3	4	0	1	0	43	3
Vegalta Sendai	2001	J2 League	36	3	3	1	1	0	40	4
Vegalta Sendai	2002	J1 League	2	0	0	0	3	0	5	0
Vegalta Sendai	2003	J1 League	13	0	1	0	1	0	15	0
Vegalta Sendai	2004	J2 League	2	0	0	0	-		2	0
Career total			181	27	17	4	8	0	206	31

== Managerial statistics ==
Update; December 31, 2019

Team	From	To	Record				
Team	From	To	G	W	D	L	Win%
Vegalta Sendai	2014	2019	198	67	40	91	33.84
Renofa Yamaguchi	2021	2021	31	8	8	15	25.81
Montedio Yamagata	2023	2025	102	47	16	39	46.08
Total			229	75	48	106	32.75

== Honours ==
Vegalta Sendai

- Emperor's Cup
  - Runners-up: 2018

Individual

- Monthly Best coach: 2019(June)
