= Silvinho =

Silvinho is a Portuguese nickname for people named Sílvio, and it means "small Sílvio".

It can refer to these footballers:

- Silvinho (footballer, born 1958), Silvio Paiva, Brazilian winger
- Silvinho (footballer, born 1974), Sílvio Antônio, Brazilian striker
- Silvinho (footballer, born 1977), Sílvio José Canuto, Brazilian midfielder
- Silvinho (footballer, born 1990), Sílvio José Cardoso Reis Júnior, Brazilian winger
- Silvinho Canuto (born 1977), Brazilian midfielder
- Silvinho Esajas (born 2002), Dutch defender
- Sylvinho (born 1974), Brazilian defender
