= Eiji Gaya =

Japanese footballer

Eiji Gaya 賀谷 英司
Personal information
- Full name: Eiji Gaya
- Date of birth: 8 February 1969 (age 57)
- Place of birth: Muroran, Hokkaido, Japan
- Height: 1.76 m (5 ft 9 1/2 in)
- Position: Defender

Youth career
- 1984–1986: Noboribetsu Otani High School

Senior career*
Years	Team	Apps	(Gls)
1987–1996	Kashima Antlers	104	(0)
1997	Yokohama Marinos	26	(0)
1998–1999	Kyoto Purple Sanga	0	(0)
2000–2001	Vegalta Sendai	64	(2)
Total		194	(2)
Medal record
Kashima Antlers
Winner	J1 League	1996
Runner-up	J1 League	1993
Runner-up	JSL Cup	1987
Runner-up	Emperor's Cup	1993
- * Club domestic league appearances and goals

Eiji Gaya (賀谷 英司, Gaya Eiji; born 8 February 1969) is a former Japanese football player.

== Playing career ==
Gaya was born in Muroran on 8 February 1969. After graduating from high school, he joined Sumitomo Metal (later Kashima Antlers) in 1987. He gradually got an opportunity to play in the match as left side back. In 1994, newcomer Naoki Soma became a regular player as left side back and Gaya was converted to right side back. However, his opportunity to play decreased behind Naruyuki Naito in 1995. He moved to Yokohama Marinos in 1997, where he played many matches. In 1998, he moved to Kyoto Purple Sanga. However he could hardly play in the match and he moved to J2 League club Vegalta Sendai in 2000. He played many matches as regular player. He retired at the end of the 2001 season.

== Club statistics ==
Club performance			League		Cup		League Cup		Total	
Season	Club	League	Apps	Goals	Apps	Goals	Apps	Goals	Apps	Goals
Japan			League		Emperor's Cup		J.League Cup		Total	
1987/88	Sumitomo Metal	JSL Division 1								
1988/89	Sumitomo Metal	JSL Division 1								
1989/90	Sumitomo Metal	JSL Division 2	4	0			0	0	4	0
1990/91	Sumitomo Metal	JSL Division 2	10	0			0	0	10	0
1991/92	Sumitomo Metal	JSL Division 2	9	0			0	0	9	0
1992	Kashima Antlers	J1 League	-		3	0	5	0	8	0
1993	Kashima Antlers	J1 League	27	0	0	0	6	1	33	1
1994	Kashima Antlers	J1 League	35	0	0	0	1	0	36	0
1995	Kashima Antlers	J1 League	16	0	0	0	-		16	0
1996	Kashima Antlers	J1 League	1	0	0	0	2	0	3	0
1997	Yokohama Marinos	J1 League	26	0	0	0	5	0	31	0
1998	Kyoto Purple Sanga	J1 League	0	0	0	0	1	0	1	0
1999	Kyoto Purple Sanga	J1 League	0	0	0	0	0	0	0	0
2000	Vegalta Sendai	J2 League	38	2	1	0	2	0	41	0
2001	Vegalta Sendai	J2 League	26	0	1	0	1	0	28	0
Total			192	2	5	0	23	1	220	3
