= Shinya Mitsuoka =

Japanese footballer

Shinya Mitsuoka 光岡 眞矢
Personal information
- Full name: Shinya Mitsuoka
- Date of birth: April 22, 1976 (age 50)
- Place of birth: Kanagawa, Japan
- Height: 1.76 m (5 ft 9 1/2 in)
- Position: Forward

Youth career
- 1992–1994: Nihon University Fujisawa High School

Senior career*
Years	Team	Apps	(Gls)
1995–1997	Yokohama Flügels	16	(2)
1998–2000	Kyoto Purple Sanga	26	(2)
2001–2002	Vegalta Sendai	28	(3)
2003	Sagawa Express Tokyo	3	(0)
Total		73	(7)
Medal record
Yokohama Flügels
Runner-up	Emperor's Cup	1997
- * Club domestic league appearances and goals

Shinya Mitsuoka (光岡 眞矢, Mitsuoka Shinya; born April 22, 1976) is a former Japanese football player.

== Playing career ==
Mitsuoka was born in Kanagawa Prefecture on April 22, 1976. After graduating from high school, he joined his local club Yokohama Flügels in 1995. On April 26, he debuted against Gamba Osaka. In this match, he scored an opening goal in the 2nd minute. After the debut, he played as forward and offensive midfielder. In 1997, the club won the 2nd place in Emperor's Cup. In 1998, he moved to Kyoto Purple Sanga. He played many matches as forward. However he hurt his knee and he could not play at all in the match after that. In 2001, he moved to J2 League club Vegalta Sendai. He played many matches as substitute and the club won the champions in 2001. Although the club was promoted to J1 League from 2002, his opportunity to play decreased. In 2003, he moved to Football League club Sagawa Express Tokyo. However he could hardly play in the match and he retired end of 2003 season.

== Career statistics ==
Appearances and goals by club, season and competition
Club	Season	League			Emperor's Cup		J.League Cup		Total	
Club	Season	Division	Apps	Goals	Apps	Goals	Apps	Goals	Apps	Goals
Yokohama Flügels	1995	J1 League	9	2	1	0	—		10	2
Yokohama Flügels	1996	J1 League	1	0	1	3	2	0	4	3
Yokohama Flügels	1997	J1 League	6	0	5	1	1	0	12	1
Kyoto Purple Sanga	1998	J1 League	24	2	2	2	2	0	28	4
Kyoto Purple Sanga	1999	J1 League	2	0	0	0	0	0	2	0
Kyoto Purple Sanga	2000	J1 League	0	0	0	0	0	0	0	0
Vegalta Sendai	2001	J2 League	21	3	2	0	2	0	25	3
Vegalta Sendai	2002	J1 League	7	0	0	0	3	0	10	0
Sagawa Express Tokyo	2003	Football League	3	0	0	0	—		3	0
Career total			73	7	11	6	10	0	94	13
