= Toshiyuki Abe =

Japanese footballer

Toshiyuki Abe 阿部 敏之
Personal information
- Date of birth: August 1, 1974 (age 52)
- Place of birth: Saitama, Japan
- Height: 1.80 m (5 ft 11 in)
- Position: Midfielder

Youth career
- 1990–1992: Teikyo High School

College career
Years	Team	Apps	(Gls)
1993–1994	University of Tsukuba		

Senior career*
Years	Team	Apps	(Gls)
1995–1999	Kashima Antlers	63	(3)
1997	→ CFZ (loan)		
2000–2002	Urawa Reds	55	(10)
2002–2003	Vegalta Sendai	25	(1)
2004	Albirex Niigata	0	(0)
2005	Kashima Antlers	8	(0)
Total		151	(14)
Medal record
Kashima Antlers
Winner	J1 League	1996
Winner	J1 League	1998
Runner-up	J1 League	1997
Winner	J.League Cup	1997
Runner-up	J.League Cup	1999
Winner	Emperor's Cup	1997
Urawa Reds
Runner-up	J.League Cup	2002
- * Club domestic league appearances and goals

Toshiyuki Abe (阿部 敏之, Abe Toshiyuki; born August 1, 1974) is a former Japanese football player.

== Playing career ==
Abe was born in Saitama on August 1, 1974. After he dropped out from University of Tsukuba, he joined Kashima Antlers in 1995. Although he played many matches in 1995, he could hardly play in the matches in 1996 and 1997. He also played for CFZ in 1997. From 1998, he played many matches and the club won the 1999 J1 League. In Asia, the club finished in third place of the 1998–99 Asian Cup Winners' Cup. In 2000, he moved to newly relegated J2 League club, Urawa Reds, based in his local area. He played many matches and the club returned to the J1 League in a year. However his opportunity to play decreased in 2002. In September 2002, he moved to newly promoted to J1 club, Vegalta Sendai. Although he played in 2 seasons, the club was relegated to J2 end of the 2002 season. In 2004, he moved to newly promoted J1 club, Albirex Niigata. However he could hardly play in the match for injury. In 2005, he moved to his first club Kashima Antlers and retired at the end of the 2005 season.

== Career statistics ==
Appearances and goals by club, season and competition
Club	Season	League			Emperor's Cup		J.League Cup		Total	
Club	Season	Division	Apps	Goals	Apps	Goals	Apps	Goals	Apps	Goals
Kashima Antlers	1995	J1 League	14	0	0	0	–		14	0
Kashima Antlers	1996	J1 League	0	0	0	0	4	0	4	0
Kashima Antlers	1997	J1 League	0	0	0	0	1	0	1	0
Kashima Antlers	1998	J1 League	23	1	4	0	5	0	32	1
Kashima Antlers	1999	J1 League	26	2	2	0	6	1	34	3
Urawa Reds	2000	J2 League	28	7	2	1	0	0	30	8
Urawa Reds	2001	J1 League	23	3	4	2	6	0	33	5
Urawa Reds	2002	J1 League	4	0	0	0	1	0	5	0
Vegalta Sendai	2002	J1 League	10	0	2	0	–		12	0
Vegalta Sendai	2003	J1 League	15	1	0	0	6	0	21	1
Albirex Niigata	2004	J1 League	0	0	0	0	3	0	3	0
Kashima Antlers	2005	J1 League	8	0	1	0	4	0	13	0
Career total			151	14	36	1	15	3	202	18
