= Kazuhiro Murakami =

Japanese footballer

Kazuhiro Murakami 村上 和弘
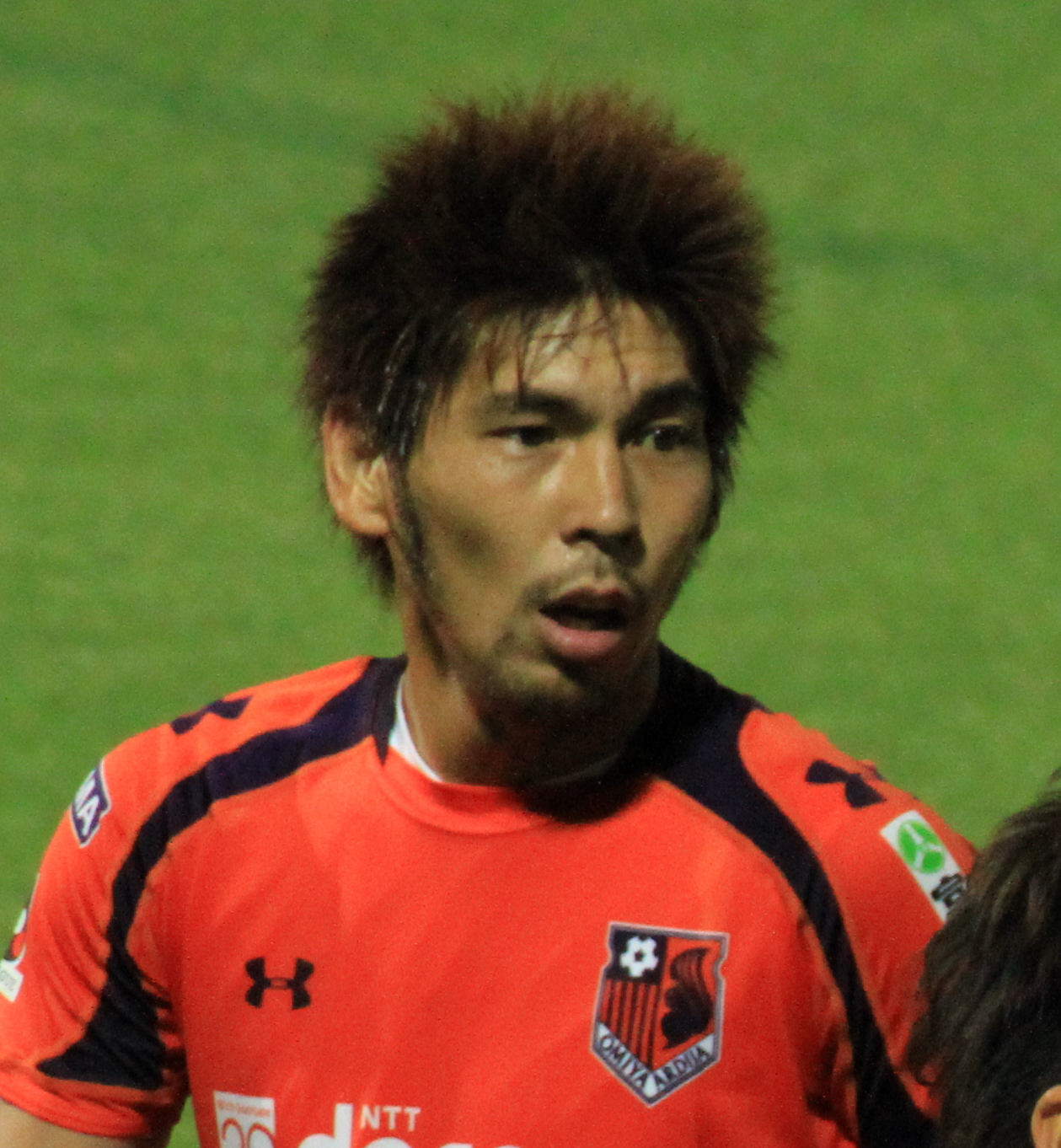

Personal information
- Full name: Kazuhiro Murakami
- Date of birth: January 20, 1981 (age 45)
- Place of birth: Yokkaichi, Mie, Japan
- Height: 1.78 m (5 ft 10 in)
- Position: Defender

Youth career
- 1996–1998: Yokkaichi Yogo High School

Senior career*
Years	Team	Apps	(Gls)
1999–2000	Yokohama F. Marinos	0	(0)
2001–2006	Vegalta Sendai	125	(9)
2007–2009	Kawasaki Frontale	75	(5)
2010–2014	Omiya Ardija	86	(4)
2014–2015	Vegalta Sendai	10	(1)
Total		296	(19)
Medal record
Yokohama F. Marinos
Runner-up	J1 League	2000
Kawasaki Frontale
Runner-up	J1 League	2008
Runner-up	J1 League	2009
Runner-up	J.League Cup	2007
Runner-up	J.League Cup	2009
- * Club domestic league appearances and goals

Kazuhiro Murakami (村上 和弘, Murakami Kazuhiro; born January 20, 1981) is a former Japanese football player He is the current assistant manager of Vegalta Sendai.

== Playing career ==
Murakami was born in Yokkaichi on January 20, 1981. After graduating from high school, he joined J1 League club Yokohama F. Marinos in 1999. Although he debuted and played several matches in 1999 J.League Cup, he could hardly play in the match. In 2001, he moved to J2 League club Vegalta Sendai. Although he could hardly play in the match in 2001 season, the club was promoted to J1 from 2002. From 2002, although he got opportunity to play as substitute midfielder, the club was relegated to J2 from 2004. From 2004, he played many matches as left side midfielder. From late 2005, he became a regular player as left side back. In 2007, he moved to J1 club Kawasaki Frontale. In 2007, he became a regular player as left side midfielder. Although his opportunity to play decreased behind Satoru Yamagishi in 2008, he became a regular player as left side back in 2009. The club won the 2nd place for 2 years in a row (2008-2009). The club also won the 2nd place 2007 and 2009 Emperor's Cup. In 2010, he moved to Omiya Ardija. He played many matches as right and left side back. However his opportunity to play decreased from 2012. In July 2014, he moved to Vegalta Sendai for the first time in 7 years. He retired end of 2015 season.

== Career statistics ==
Appearances and goals by club, season and competition
Club	Season	League			Emperor's Cup		J.League Cup		Asia		Total	
Club	Season	Division	Apps	Goals	Apps	Goals	Apps	Goals	Apps	Goals	Apps	Goals
Yokohama F. Marinos	1999	J1 League	0	0	0	0	3	1	—		3	1
Yokohama F. Marinos	2000	J1 League	0	0	0	0	0	0	—		0	0
Vegalta Sendai	2001	J2 League	4	0	3	1	0	0	—		7	1
Vegalta Sendai	2002	J1 League	18	0	1	0	6	1	—		25	1
Vegalta Sendai	2003	J1 League	13	0	1	0	0	0	—		14	0
Vegalta Sendai	2004	J2 League	36	4	1	0	—		—		37	4
Vegalta Sendai	2005	J2 League	26	4	1	0	—		—		27	4
Vegalta Sendai	2006	J2 League	28	1	0	0	—		—		28	1
Kawasaki Frontale	2007	J1 League	22	4	3	0	1	0	6	0	32	4
Kawasaki Frontale	2008	J1 League	25	1	2	0	5	0	—		32	1
Kawasaki Frontale	2009	J1 League	28	0	4	0	5	0	6	0	43	0
Omiya Ardija	2010	J1 League	29	3	2	0	6	1	—		37	4
Omiya Ardija	2011	J1 League	29	1	1	0	1	0	—		31	1
Omiya Ardija	2012	J1 League	14	0	1	0	1	0	—		16	0
Omiya Ardija	2013	J1 League	11	0	2	0	3	0	—		16	0
Omiya Ardija	2014	J1 League	3	0	0	0	1	0	—		4	0
Vegalta Sendai	2014	J1 League	9	1	0	0	0	0	—		9	1
Vegalta Sendai	2015	J1 League	1	0	1	0	1	0	—		3	0
Career total			296	19	23	2	33	3	12	0	364	24
