= Naoki Chiba =

Japanese footballer

Naoki Chiba 千葉 直樹
Personal information
- Full name: Naoki Chiba
- Date of birth: July 24, 1977 (age 49)
- Place of birth: Sendai, Japan
- Height: 1.79 m (5 ft 10 1/2 in)
- Position: Midfielder

Youth career
- 1993–1995: Tohoku Gakuin High School

Senior career*
Years	Team	Apps	(Gls)
1996–2010	Vegalta Sendai	430	(18)
Total		430	(18)
- * Club domestic league appearances and goals

Naoki Chiba (千葉 直樹, Chiba Naoki; born July 24, 1977) is a former Japanese football player.

== Playing career ==
Chiba was born in Sendai on July 24, 1977. After graduating from high school, he joined Japan Football League club Brummel Sendai (later Vegalta Sendai) based in his local in 1996. He became a regular player from 1997 and played many matches as defensive midfielder for the club for a long time. The club was promoted to new league J2 League from 1999. In 2001, the club won the 2nd place and was promoted to J1 League from 2002. However the club gained new member Hajime Moriyasu and Silvinho in 2002 and Toshiya Ishii in 2003. So, Chiba's opportunity to play decreased behind new member from 2002 and the club was relegated to J2 from 2004. From 2004, he became a regular player again. In 2009, the club won the champions and was promoted to J1 from 2010 for the first time in 7 years. He retired end of 2010 season.

== Career statistics ==
Appearances and goals by club, season and competition
Club	Season	League			Emperor's Cup		J.League Cup		Total	
Club	Season	Division	Apps	Goals	Apps	Goals	Apps	Goals	Apps	Goals
Brummel Sendai	1996	Football League	0	0	0	0	—		0	0
Brummel Sendai	1997	Football League	17	1	2	0	1	0	20	1
Brummel Sendai	1998	Football League	26	0	4	0	4	0	34	0
Vegalta Sendai	1999	J2 League	31	0	2	0	2	0	35	0
Vegalta Sendai	2000	J2 League	39	2	1	0	2	0	42	2
Vegalta Sendai	2001	J2 League	38	1	3	1	2	0	43	2
Vegalta Sendai	2002	J1 League	17	0	0	0	5	0	22	0
Vegalta Sendai	2003	J1 League	8	0	0	0	2	0	10	0
Vegalta Sendai	2004	J2 League	27	1	0	0	—		27	1
Vegalta Sendai	2005	J2 League	36	1	1	0	—		37	1
Vegalta Sendai	2006	J2 League	44	2	2	0	—		46	2
Vegalta Sendai	2007	J2 League	43	4	0	0	—		43	4
Vegalta Sendai	2008	J2 League	39	1	1	0	—		40	1
Vegalta Sendai	2009	J2 League	40	5	4	0	—		44	5
Vegalta Sendai	2010	J1 League	25	0	1	0	3	0	29	0
Career total			430	18	21	1	21	0	472	19
