= Shinji Fujiyoshi =

Japanese footballer

Shinji Fujiyoshi 藤吉 信次
Personal information
- Full name: Shinji Fujiyoshi
- Date of birth: April 3, 1970 (age 56)
- Place of birth: Machida, Tokyo, Japan
- Height: 1.77 m (5 ft 9 1/2 in)
- Position: Forward

Team information
- Current team: Fukui United (manager)

Youth career
- 1986–1988: Yomiuri

Senior career*
Years	Team	Apps	(Gls)
1989–1996	Verdy Kawasaki	65	(14)
1996–1999	Kyoto Purple Sanga	65	(9)
2000–2002	Vegalta Sendai	79	(19)
2003	Chengdu F.C.		
2004–2006	FC Ryukyu	42	(8)
2007–2009	New Wave Kitakyushu	48	(8)
Total		299	(58)

Managerial career
- 2022–: Fukui United
Medal record
Verdy Kawasaki
Winner	Japan Soccer League	1990/91
Winner	Japan Soccer League	1991/92
Runner-up	Japan Soccer League	1989/90
Winner	J1 League	1993
Winner	J1 League	1994
Runner-up	J1 League	1995
Winner	JSL Cup	1991
Winner	J.League Cup	1992
Winner	J.League Cup	1993
Winner	J.League Cup	1994
Runner-up	J.League Cup	1996
Winner	Emperor's Cup	1996
Runner-up	Emperor's Cup	1991
Runner-up	Emperor's Cup	1992
- * Club domestic league appearances and goals

Shinji Fujiyoshi (藤吉 信次, Fujiyoshi Shinji; born April 3, 1970) is a Japanese football manager and former player. He is currently manager of Fukui United.

== Playing career ==
Fujiyoshi was born in Machida on April 3, 1970. He joined Yomiuri (later Verdy Kawasaki) from youth team in 1989. Although He played many matches as forward from first season, his opportunity to play decreased behind Japan national team players Kazuyoshi Miura and Nobuhiro Takeda. In July 1996, he moved to Kyoto Purple Sanga. Although he played as regular player, his opportunity to play decreased from 1998. In 2000, he moved to J2 League club Vegalta Sendai. He played as regular player and the club was promoted to J1 League in 2002. In 2003, he moved to China and joined Chengdu F.C. In 2004, he returned to Japan and joined Prefectural Leagues club FC Ryukyu. The club was promoted to Regional Leagues in 2005 and Japan Football League (JFL) in 2006. In 2007, he moved to Regional Leagues club New Wave Kitakyushu. The club was promoted to JFL in 2008. He retired end of 2009 season.

== Managerial career ==
On 7 January 2022, Fujiyoshi has been officially appointed as the coach of Fukui United aiming for promotion to the JFL in 2023.

On 30 October 2022, he finished 3rd in the Japanese regional league in the hokushinetsu group for failing to advance in the championship round.

== Career statistics ==
Club performance			League		Cup		League Cup		Total	
Season	Club	League	Apps	Goals	Apps	Goals	Apps	Goals	Apps	Goals
Japan			League		Emperor's Cup		J.League Cup		Total	
1989/90	Yomiuri	JSL Division 1	10	2	0	0	1	0	11	2
1990/91	Yomiuri	JSL Division 1	17	4	2	0	2	2	21	6
1991/92	Yomiuri	JSL Division 1	2	0	0	0	1	0	3	0
1992	Verdy Kawasaki	J1 League	-		1	0	0	0	1	0
1993	Verdy Kawasaki	J1 League	6	1	2	0	8	4	16	5
1994	Verdy Kawasaki	J1 League	8	3	2	0	0	0	10	3
1995	Verdy Kawasaki	J1 League	17	4	3	0	-		20	4
1996	Verdy Kawasaki	J1 League	5	0	0	0	5	1	10	1
1996	Kyoto Purple Sanga	J1 League	13	2	3	1	0	0	16	3
1997	Kyoto Purple Sanga	J1 League	29	6	1	0	6	0	36	6
1998	Kyoto Purple Sanga	J1 League	6	0	1	0	0	0	7	0
1999	Kyoto Purple Sanga	J1 League	17	1	0	0	4	2	21	3
2000	Vegalta Sendai	J2 League	39	10	1	0	0	0	40	10
2001	Vegalta Sendai	J2 League	31	8	3	0	1	0	35	8
2002	Vegalta Sendai	J1 League	9	1	2	0	6	1	17	2
2004	FC Ryukyu	Prefectural Leagues	6	7	1	0	-		7	7
2005	FC Ryukyu	Regional Leagues	5	0	1	0	-		6	0
2006	FC Ryukyu	Football League	31	1	0	0	-		31	1
2007	New Wave Kitakyushu	Regional Leagues	20	7	0	0	-		20	7
2008	New Wave Kitakyushu	Football League	25	1	3	0	-		28	1
2009	New Wave Kitakyushu	Football League	3	0	0	0	-		3	0
Total			298	58	28	3	34	10	360	71

== Managerial statistics ==
Update; start from 2023 season

Team	From	To	Record				
Team	From	To	G	W	D	L	Win %
Fukui United	2022	present	14	9	1	4	64.29
Total			14	9	1	4	64.29
