= Katsuyuki Saito =

Japanese footballer

Katsuyuki Saito 斎藤 克幸
Personal information
- Full name: Katsuyuki Saito
- Date of birth: April 7, 1973 (age 53)
- Place of birth: Fukushima, Japan
- Height: 1.75 m (5 ft 9 in)
- Position: Defender

Youth career
- Fukushima Higashi High School
- University of Tsukuba

Senior career*
Years	Team	Apps	(Gls)
1997–2001	Vegalta Sendai	82	(2)
Total		82	(2)
- * Club domestic league appearances and goals

Katsuyuki Saito (斎藤 克幸, Saitō Katsuyuki; born April 7, 1973) is a former Japanese football player.

== Playing career ==
Saito was born in Fukushima Prefecture on April 7, 1973. After graduating from University of Tsukuba, he joined Japan Football League club Brummell Sendai (later Vegalta Sendai) in 1997. He became a regular player as right side back from first season. The club was promoted to J2 League from 1999. However his opportunity to play decreased from 2000 and he retired at the end of the 2001 season.

== Career statistics ==
Appearances and goals by club, season and competition
Club	Season	League			Emperor's Cup		J.League Cup		Total	
Club	Season	Division	Apps	Goals	Apps	Goals	Apps	Goals	Apps	Goals
Brummell Sendai	1997	Football League	27	2	2	1	0	0	29	3
Brummell Sendai	1998	Football League	28	0	3	0	4	0	35	0
Vegalta Sendai	1999	J2 League	29	0	1	0	2	0	32	0
Vegalta Sendai	2000	J2 League	10	0	0	0	1	0	11	0
Vegalta Sendai	2001	J2 League	0	0	0	0	0	0	0	0
Career total			94	2	6	1	7	0	107	3
