= Nobuyuki Zaizen =

Japanese footballer

Personal information
- Date of birth: 19 October 1976 (age 50)
- Place of birth: Muroran, Hokkaido, Japan
- Height: 1.70 m (5 ft 7 in)
- Position: Midfielder

Youth career
- 1989–1994: Verdy Kawasaki

Senior career*
Years	Team	Apps	(Gls)
1995–1998	Verdy Kawasaki	0	(0)
1996	→ Logroñés (loan)	0	(0)
1999	Rijeka	0	(0)
1999–2005	Vegalta Sendai	154	(18)
2006–2009	Montedio Yamagata	105	(5)
2010	Muangthong United	11	(0)
2011	BEC Tero Sasana	10	(0)
Total		280	(23)

International career
1993	Japan U17	4	(0)
- * Club domestic league appearances and goals

Nobuyuki Zaizen (財前 宣之, Zaizen Nobuyuki; born 19 October 1976) is a Japanese former professional footballer who played as a midfielder.

== Early and personal life ==
Zaizen was born in Muroran on 19 October 1976. His elder brother Keiichi is also a former footballer.

== Club career ==
He joined Verdy Kawasaki from their youth team in 1995. In 1996, he moved to La Liga club Logroñés on loan. However he could not play in the match for injury and returned to Japan. He debuted in 1998 J.League Cup. Through Croatian club Rijeka, he joined J2 League club Vegalta Sendai in 1999. He played as offensive midfielder in many matches. In 2001, he became a regular player and the club was promoted to J1 League first time in the club history. From 2002, although his opportunity to play decreased and the club was relegated J2 League end of 2003 season, he played as regular player again from 2004. He moved to Montedio Yamagata in 2006. In 2008, although his opportunity to play decreased, the club was promoted to J1 League first time in the club history. In 2010, he moved to Thailand and played for Muangthong United (2010) and BEC Tero Sasana (2011). He announced his retirement in January 2012.

== National team career ==
In August 1993, Zaizen was part of the Japanese under-17 team at the 1993 U-17 World Championship, playing in all 4 matches. He was selected a member of the 'All Star' team at the tournament.

== Club statistics ==
Club performance			League		Cup		League Cup		Total	
Season	Club	League	Apps	Goals	Apps	Goals	Apps	Goals	Apps	Goals
Japan			League		Emperor's Cup		J.League Cup		Total	
1995	Verdy Kawasaki	J1 League	0	0	0	0	-		0	0
1997	Verdy Kawasaki	J1 League	0	0	0	0	0	0	0	0
1998	Verdy Kawasaki	J1 League	0	0	0	0	4	0	4	0
1999	Vegalta Sendai	J2 League	6	1	0	0	0	0	6	1
2000	Vegalta Sendai	J2 League	20	2	1	0	0	0	21	2
2001	Vegalta Sendai	J2 League	39	7	3	0	1	0	43	7
2002	Vegalta Sendai	J1 League	18	0	2	1	6	0	26	1
2003	Vegalta Sendai	J1 League	8	0	1	0	4	1	13	1
2004	Vegalta Sendai	J2 League	36	5	0	0	-		36	5
2005	Vegalta Sendai	J2 League	27	3	1	0	-		28	3
2006	Montedio Yamagata	J2 League	35	4	0	0	-		35	4
2007	Montedio Yamagata	J2 League	38	1	2	0	-		40	1
2008	Montedio Yamagata	J2 League	21	0	0	0	-		21	0
2009	Montedio Yamagata	J1 League	11	0	2	0	4	0	17	0
Total			259	23	12	1	19	1	290	25
