= Ichizo Nakata =

Japanese footballer & manager (born 1973)

Ichizo Nakata 中田 一三
Personal information
- Full name: Ichizo Nakata
- Date of birth: April 19, 1973 (age 53)
- Place of birth: Iga, Mie, Japan
- Height: 1.75 m (5 ft 9 in)
- Position: Defender

Youth career
- 1989–1991: Yokkaichi Chuo Technical High School

Senior career*
Years	Team	Apps	(Gls)
1992–1995	Yokohama Flügels	27	(0)
1996–1997	Avispa Fukuoka	34	(0)
1998	Oita Trinity	23	(1)
1998–2000	JEF United Ichihara	52	(1)
2001	Oita Trinita	18	(1)
2002–2003	Vegalta Sendai	6	(0)
2004	Ventforet Kofu	5	(0)
Total		165	(3)

Managerial career
- 2019: Kyoto Sanga FC
- 2024–2025: Nara Club
Medal record
Yokohama Flügels
Winner	Emperor's Cup	1993
JEF United Ichihara
Runner-up	J.League Cup	1998
- * Club domestic league appearances and goals

Ichizo Nakata (中田 一三, Nakata Ichizo; born April 19, 1973) is a Japanese football manager and former player.

== Playing career ==
Nakata was born in Iga on April 19, 1973. He played for many clubs as defensive position, defender and defensive midfielder. After graduating from high school, he joined Yokohama Flügels in 1992. The club won the champions 1993 Emperor's Cup and 1994–95 Asian Cup Winners' Cup. In 1996, he moved to J1 League club, Avispa Fukuoka and played in 2 seasons. In 1998, he moved to Japan Football League club Oita Trinity (later Oita Trinita). In October 1998, he moved to JEF United Ichihara. He played many matches until 2000. In 2001, he played for Oita Trinita again. In 2002, he moved to J1 League club, Vegalta Sendai, however he could hardly play in the matches due to injury. In 2004, he moved to Ventforet Kofu.

== Coaching career ==
In 2019, Nakata signed with J2 League club Kyoto Sanga FC. He implemented a possession based style of play which had Kyoto sitting in second place in the table in the middle of the season. However results detiorated in the second half of the season and Kyoto finished in 8th place, two points short of the play-off places. His last game in charge was a 13–1 defeat to champions Kashiwa Reysol and he stepped down at the end of the season.

In August 2023, he was appointed as a player development coach at J2 League club Shimizu S-Pulse/

Following the dismissal of Julián Marín, in September 2024 Nakata was announced as the new manager of J3 League club Nara Club.

== Career statistics ==
Appearances and goals by club, season and competition
Club	Season	League			Emperor's Cup		J.League Cup		Total	
Club	Season	Division	Apps	Goals	Apps	Goals	Apps	Goals	Apps	Goals
Yokohama Flügels	1992	J1 League	-				0	0	0	0
Yokohama Flügels	1993	J1 League	5	0	1	0	3	0	9	0
Yokohama Flügels	1994	J1 League	14	0	0	0	0	0	14	0
Yokohama Flügels	1995	J1 League	8	0	0	0	-		8	0
Avispa Fukuoka	1996	J1 League	24	0	2	0	11	0	37	0
Avispa Fukuoka	1997	J1 League	10	0	0	0	5	0	15	0
Oita Trinity	1998	JFL	23	1	0	0	0	0	23	1
JEF United Ichihara	1998	J1 League	5	0	0	0	0	0	5	0
JEF United Ichihara	1999	J1 League	21	0	1	0	2	0	24	0
JEF United Ichihara	2000	J1 League	26	1	0	0	4	0	30	1
Oita Trinita	2001	J2 League	18	1	1	0	2	0	21	1
Vegalta Sendai	2002	J1 League	0	0	0	0	0	0	0	0
Vegalta Sendai	2003	J1 League	6	0	0	0	2	0	8	0
Ventforet Kofu	2004	J2 League	5	0	0	0	-		5	0
Career total			165	3	5	0	29	0	19	3

== Managerial statistics ==
As of 25 October 2024

Team	From	To	Record				
Team	From	To	G	W	D	L	Win %
Kyoto Sanga FC	2019	2019	43	19	11	13	44.19
Nara Club	2024	Present	7	0	6	1	0.00
Total			50	19	17	14	38.00
