= Yōsuke Nakata =

Japanese footballer

Yosuke Nakata 中田 洋介
Personal information
- Full name: Yosuke Nakata
- Date of birth: September 15, 1981 (age 45)
- Place of birth: Ofunato, Iwate, Japan
- Height: 1.73 m (5 ft 8 in)
- Position: Defender

Youth career
- 1997–1999: Ofunato High School
- 2000–2003: Komazawa University

Senior career*
Years	Team	Apps	(Gls)
2004–2007	Vegalta Sendai	87	(0)
2008	Yokohama FC	28	(0)
2009–2010	Grulla Morioka	26	(4)
2012	Morioka Zebra	1	(0)
Total		142	(4)
- * Club domestic league appearances and goals

Yosuke Nakata (中田 洋介, Nakata Yōsuke; born September 15, 1981) is a former Japanese football player.

== Career statistics ==
Appearances and goals by club, season and competition
Club	Season	League			Emperor's Cup		Total	
Club	Season	Division	Apps	Goals	Apps	Goals	Apps	Goals
Vegalta Sendai	2004	J2 League	26	0	1	0	27	0
Vegalta Sendai	2005	J2 League	23	0	1	0	24	0
Vegalta Sendai	2006	J2 League	31	0	2	0	33	0
Vegalta Sendai	2007	J2 League	7	0	1	0	8	0
Yokohama FC	2008	J2 League	28	0	1	0	29	0
Grulla Morioka	2009	Regional Leagues	12	2	1	2	13	4
Grulla Morioka	2010	Regional Leagues						
Career total			127	2	7	2	134	4
