= Alex Garcia (footballer, born 1979) =

Brazilian footballer (born 1979)

Personal information
- Full name: Alex Rogério Garcia de Oliveira
- Date of birth: 9 April 1979 (age 47)
- Place of birth: Jaguapitã, Brazil
- Height: 1.73 m (5 ft 8 in)
- Position: Defender

Senior career*
| Years | Team | Apps | (Gls) |
| 2000 | Mirassol | | |
| 2000 | Juventude | | |
| 2000–2001 | Académica de Coimbra | 17 | (2) |
| 2001 | Omiya Ardija | | |
| 2002 | Mirassol | | |
| 2003 | Leça | 12 | (2) |
| 2003–2004 | Estrela da Amadora | 25 | (1) |
| 2004–2005 | Ovarense | 20 | (0) |
| 2005–2006 | Maia | 27 | (0) |
| 2006–2007 | União da Madeira | | |
| 2007–2008 | Operário | | |
| 2008–2009 | Gondomar | 25 | (0) |
| 2009–2010 | Penafiel | 22 | (1) |
| 2010–2013 | AD Nogueirense | | |
| 2013–2017 | Pampilhosa | 120 | (8) |
- * Club domestic league appearances and goals

Alex Rogério Garcia de Oliveira, known as Alex Garcia (born 9 April 1979) is a Brazilian former professional footballer who played as a defender.

== Career ==
Alex Garcia made his professional debut in the Segunda Liga for Académica de Coimbra on 1 October 2000 in a game against Freamunde.

He made his Primeira Liga debut for Estrela da Amadora on 24 August 2003, when he played the whole game in a 1–1 draw against Porto.
