= Marquem =

Brazilian footballer

Personal information
- Full name: Marquem Nuguen Gonçalves Ferreira
- Date of birth: 30 November 1983 (age 42)
- Place of birth: Santa Rosa de Lima, Sergipe, Brazil
- Height: 1.85 m (6 ft 1 in)
- Position: Defender

Youth career
- 2000–2002: São Paulo

Senior career*
Years	Team	Apps	(Gls)
2003	Vegalta Sendai		
2003–2006	Juventude B		
2006–2007	Noroeste		
2007–2008	Clube 15 de Novembro		
2007	→ Cascavel (loan)		
2008	→ Muçulmana de Maputo (loan)		
2008	→ América-SP (loan)		
2008–2009	Anápolis		
2009–2010	Camboriú		
2010	→ Canoas (loan)		
2010–2011	Campinense Clube		

International career
2000–2001	Brazil U19		
- * Club domestic league appearances and goals

Marquem Nuguen Gonçalves Ferreira (born 30 November 1983), commonly known as Marquem Gonçalves or simply Marquem, is a Brazilian former professional footballer who played as a defender.

== Club career ==
Marquem was a product of São Paulo youth academy in Brazil. He left Brazil to join Vegalta Sendai in Japan, only at the age of 20. He only spent a year with Vegalta Sendai with the main reason of not having enough playing time and normally was an unused sub. He returned to Brazil and join Esporte Clube Juventude B team.

Failing to join any top clubs in Brazil, he continued to play for lower division clubs such as Esporte Clube Noroeste, Clube 15 de Novembro and the Anápolis Futebol Clube in Brazil.

Marquem also had a short season with the Mozambique club, Liga Muçulmana de Maputo in 2008.

After eight years playing in the lower division with various clubs, he eventually left Brazil and joined the Malaysian club, Negeri Sembilan FA alongside Jean-Emmanuel Effa Owona on 30 November 2011, after Marquen managed to impress coach, Mohd Azraai Khor Abdullah. However, he later failed to register in the league after failing meeting the Football Association of Malaysia rules and requirements.

== International career ==
Maruem once appeared with the Brazil national under-19 team in 2000, after an impressive season with the São Paulo youth academy.
