= Takahiro Kimura (footballer) =

Japanese footballer and manager

Takahiro Kimura 木村 孝洋
Personal information
- Full name: Takahiro Kimura
- Date of birth: April 4, 1957 (age 69)
- Place of birth: Fuchu, Hiroshima, Japan
- Position: Midfielder

Youth career
- Hiroshima Minami High School
- Waseda University

Senior career*
Years	Team	Apps	(Gls)
1983–1988	Mazda		

Managerial career
- 2001: Sanfrecce Hiroshima (caretaker)
- 2002: Sanfrecce Hiroshima
- 2005–2006: TEPCO Mareeze
- 2011: FC Gifu
- 2012–2015: FC Imabari
Medal record
Mazda
Runner-up	Emperor's Cup	1987
- * Club domestic league appearances and goals

Takahiro Kimura (木村 孝洋, Kimura Takahiro; born April 4, 1957) is a former Japanese football player and manager.

== Playing career ==
Kimura was born in Fuchu, Hiroshima on April 4, 1957. After graduating from Waseda University, he joined his local club Mazda (later Sanfrecce Hiroshima) in 1983. He retired in 1988.

== Coaching career ==
After retirement, Kimura started coaching career at Sanfrecce Hiroshima in 1995. He became an assistant coach for top team and manager for youth team. In July 2002, he was promoted manager as Gadzhi Gadzhiyev successor, but he resigned end of season. In 2005, he moved to TEPCO Mareeze, but he resigned in 2006. He also managed FC Gifu (2011) and FC Imabari (2012-2015).

== Managerial statistics ==
Team	From	To	Record				
Team	From	To	G	W	D	L	Win %
Sanfrecce Hiroshima	17 July 2002	December 2002	22	6	2	14	27.27
TEPCO Mareeze	January 2005	December 2006	38	12	7	19	31.58
FC Gifu	January 2011	December 2011	38	6	6	26	15.79
FC Imabari	January 2012	December 2015	56	47	5	4	83.93
Total			154	71	20	63	46.10
