= Ricardinho (footballer, born May 1984) =

Brazilian footballer

Personal information
- Full name: José Ricardo dos Santos Oliveira
- Date of birth: May 19, 1984 (age 42)
- Place of birth: João Pessoa, Paraíba, Brazil
- Height: 1.73 m (5 ft 8 in)
- Position: Striker

Team information
- Current team: Santa Cruz-PB

Youth career
- 1998–1999: Santa Cruz-PB

Senior career*
Years	Team	Apps	(Gls)
2000–2003	Santa Cruz-PB	25	(0)
2002	→ Kashiwa Reysol (loan)	2	(0)
2004–2006	Palmeiras		
2005–2006	→ Grêmio (loan)		
2007–2008	Jeju United	16	(3)
2008–2009	Figueirense	10	(1)
2009	→ Botafogo (loan)	5	(0)
2010	Botafogo-SP	12	(2)
2011	Mogi Mirim	5	(2)
2011	Santa Cruz-PB	4	(0)
2012	Paulista	6	(0)
2012	São Caetano	0	(0)
2013	Guaratinguetá	5	(0)
2014	Trindade	3	(0)
2014	Santa Cruz-PB	1	(0)
- * Club domestic league appearances and goals

José Ricardo dos Santos Oliveira or simply Ricardinho (born May 19, 1984 in João Pessoa, Brazil) is a Brazilian striker, who plays for Santa Cruz Futebol Clube.
