= Marcos (footballer, born 1974) =

Brazilian footballer

Personal information
- Full name: Marcos Paulo Souza Ribeiro
- Date of birth: 21 March 1974 (age 52)
- Place of birth: Brazil
- Height: 1.89 m (6 ft 2 in)
- Position: Forward

Senior career*
Years	Team	Apps	(Gls)
1991–1995	Botafogo		
1996	Joinville		
1997	Grêmio		
1997–1998	Criciúma		
1999	Joinville		
2000	Bahia		
2001–2004	Vegalta Sendai		
2005–2006	Joinville		
- * Club domestic league appearances and goals

Marcos Paulo Souza Ribeiro (born 21 March 1974) is a Brazilian former professional footballer who played as a forward.

== Career statistics ==
Appearances and goals by club, season and competition
Club	Season	League			National cup (Note: Includes Emperor's Cup.)		League cup (Note: Includes J.League Cup.)		Total	
Club	Season	Division	Apps	Goals	Apps	Goals	Apps	Goals	Apps	Goals
Vegalta Sendai	2001	J2 League	40	34	3	3	0	0	43	37
Vegalta Sendai	2002	J1 League	24	18	0	0	2	0	26	18
Vegalta Sendai	2003	J1 League	3	3	0	0	3	1	6	4
Vegalta Sendai	2004	J2 League	1	0	0	0	–		1	0
Vegalta Sendai	Total		68	55	3	3	5	1	76	59

== Honours ==
Individual

- J2. League top scorer: 2001
- Campeonato Catarinense top scorer: 1996
