= Fábio Nunes (Brazilian footballer) =

Brazilian footballer (born 1980)

Personal information
- Full name: Fábio Nunes Fernandes
- Date of birth: 15 January 1980 (age 46)
- Place of birth: Porto Alegre, Brazil
- Height: 1.80 m (5 ft 11 in)
- Position: Striker

Senior career*
| Years | Team | Apps | (Gls) |
| 1997–2002 | Internacional | | |
| 2002–2004 | Guaraní | | |
| 2004 | Vegalta Sendai | 10 | (4) |
| 2005 | General Caballero | | |
| 2006 | Santa Cruz | | |
| 2006–2007 | Avaí | | |
| 2007 | Ajman | | |
| 2007 | Estrela da Amadora | 1 | (0) |
| 2008 | Pandurii Târgu Jiu | 3 | (0) |
| 2008–2009 | Beira-Mar | 23 | (2) |
| 2010 | Uberlândia | | |
| 2010 | Chapecoense | 5 | (1) |
| 2011 | Lajeadense | | |
| 2011 | Luverdense | | |
| 2011 | CRAC | | |
| 2012 | Hercílio Luz | | |
| 2012 | Cruzeiro-RS | | |
| 2013 | Brasília | | |
- * Club domestic league appearances and goals

Fábio Nunes Fernandes (born 15 January 1980) is a Brazilian former football player.

== Club statistics ==
| Club performance | | | League | | Cup | | Total | |
| Season | Club | League | Apps | Goals | Apps | Goals | Apps | Goals |
| Japan | | | League | | Emperor's Cup | | Total | |
|---|---|---|---|---|---|---|---|---|
| 2004 | Vegalta Sendai | J2 League | 10 | 4 | 0 | 0 | 10 | 4 |
| Total | Japan | | 10 | 4 | 0 | 0 | 10 | 4 |
| Career total | | | 10 | 4 | 0 | 0 | 10 | 4 |
