= Celso Vieira =

Brazilian footballer (born 1974)

Personal information
- Full name: Celso Vieira
- Date of birth: 25 September 1974 (age 52)
- Place of birth: Porto Alegre, Brazil
- Height: 1.81 m (5 ft 11 1/2 in)
- Positions: Full-back; midfielder

Senior career*
Years	Team	Apps	(Gls)
1994–1998	Internacional		
1996	→ Brasil de Farroupilha (loan)		
1999	Ituano		
1999–2000	Portuguesa		
2001	Vegalta Sendai	31	(0)
- * Club domestic league appearances and goals

Celso Vieira (born 25 September 1974) is a former Brazilian football player.

== Club statistics ==
Club performance			League		Cup		League Cup		Total	
Season	Club	League	Apps	Goals	Apps	Goals	Apps	Goals	Apps	Goals
Japan			League		Emperor's Cup		J.League Cup		Total	
2001	Vegalta Sendai	J2 League	31	0	3	0	0	0	34	0
Total			31	0	3	0	0	0	34	0
