= Ricardo (footballer, born 1977) =

Brazilian footballer

Personal information
- Full name: Ricardo Cavalcante Ribeiro
- Date of birth: 23 February 1977 (age 49)
- Place of birth: Brazil
- Height: 1.80 m (5 ft 11 in)
- Position: Defender

Senior career*
Years	Team	Apps	(Gls)
1998	Centro Futebol Zico		
1998–1999	Kashima Antlers		
2000–2002	Vegalta Sendai		
2003–2004	Sanfrecce Hiroshima		
2005–2006	Kyoto Purple Sanga		
2007	Juventude		
2008	Joinville		
- * Club domestic league appearances and goals

Ricardo Cavalcante Ribeiro (born 23 February 1977) is a Brazilian football player.

== Club statistics ==
Club performance			League		Cup		League Cup		Total	
Season	Club	League	Apps	Goals	Apps	Goals	Apps	Goals	Apps	Goals
Japan			League		Emperor's Cup		J.League Cup		Total	
1998	Kashima Antlers	J1 League	0	0	0	0	0	0	0	0
1999	Kashima Antlers	J1 League	16	2	2	0	5	0	23	2
2000	Vegalta Sendai	J2 League	36	2	1	0	0	0	37	2
2001	Vegalta Sendai	J2 League	33	1	3	0	1	0	37	1
2002	Vegalta Sendai	J1 League	28	1	0	0	5	0	33	1
2003	Sanfrecce Hiroshima	J2 League	43	2	4	0	-		47	2
2004	Sanfrecce Hiroshima	J1 League	26	0	1	0	5	0	32	0
2005	Kyoto Purple Sanga	J2 League	40	7	1	0	-		41	7
2006	Kyoto Purple Sanga	J1 League	10	0	0	0	4	0	14	0
Career total			232	15	12	0	20	0	264	15
