= Silvinho (footballer, born 1977) =

Brazilian footballer

Personal information
- Full name: Sílvio José Canuto
- Date of birth: 17 January 1977 (age 49)
- Place of birth: São Jerônimo da Serra, Brazil
- Height: 1.80 m (5 ft 11 in)
- Position: Attacking midfielder

Team information
- Current team: Monte Azul (head coach)

Youth career
- Londrina

Senior career*
Years	Team	Apps	(Gls)
1995	Londrina		
1996	XV de Piracicaba		
1997–1999	Guarani	38	(3)
2000	Atlético Paranaense	13	(0)
2001	Matonense		
2001	Internacional	18	(2)
2002–2005	Vegalta Sendai	117	(11)
2006–2007	Albirex Niigata	38	(4)
2008	Vitória		
2008	Adap Galo Maringá		
2009	São José-RS		
2010	Yokohama FC	11	(0)
2010	Chapecoense	8	(1)
2011	Comercial-SP	15	(2)
2011–2012	Londrina	13	(0)

Managerial career
- 2018–2021: Londrina U17
- 2019: Londrina (interim)
- 2021: Londrina
- 2021: Verê
- 2022: Maringá U20
- 2022–2023: Maringá (assistant)
- 2024–: Monte Azul
- * Club domestic league appearances and goals

Sílvio José Canuto (born 17 January 1977), commonly known as Silvinho, is a Brazilian football coach and former player who played as an attacking midfielder. He is the current head coach of Monte Azul.

== Club statistics ==
Club performance			League		Cup		League Cup		Total	
Season	Club	League	Apps	Goals	Apps	Goals	Apps	Goals	Apps	Goals
Japan			League		Emperor's Cup		J.League Cup		Total	
2002	Vegalta Sendai	J1 League	27	2	2	0	6	0	35	2
2003	Vegalta Sendai	J1 League	26	1	1	0	4	1	31	2
2004	Vegalta Sendai	J2 League	35	5	2	1	-		37	6
2005	Vegalta Sendai	J2 League	29	3	1	0	-		30	3
2006	Albirex Niigata	J1 League	30	3	2	0	5	0	37	3
2007	Albirex Niigata	J1 League	22	1	1	0	5	0	28	1
2010	Yokohama FC	J2 League	11	0	0	0	-		11	0
Total			180	15	9	1	20	1	209	17

== Honours ==
=== Player ===
Atlético Paranaense

- Campeonato Paranaense: 2000
