= Satoshi Ōtomo =

Filipino footballer

Personal information
- Full name: Satoshi Erasmo Ōtomo
- Date of birth: October 1, 1981 (age 45)
- Place of birth: Sakae, Chiba, Japan
- Height: 1.72 m (5 ft 8 in)
- Position: Midfielder

Youth career
- 1997–1999: Kashima Antlers

Senior career*
Years	Team	Apps	(Gls)
2000–2002	Vegalta Sendai	84	(15)
2003	Sagan Tosu	33	(2)
2004–2005	Yokohama FC	55	(3)
2005–2006	FC Reimsbach	12	(1)
2006	TDK	20	(1)
2007–2009	FC Gifu	46	(2)
2010	Persib Bandung	17	(2)
2010–2011	Bontang	28	(4)
2011–2012	Persela Lamongan	15	(1)
2012–2013	Ayeyawady United	18	(4)
2013–2014	Trat	21	(5)
2014–2015	Global	19	(3)
2015	Yokogawa Musashino	18	(0)
2016–2018	JPV Marikina	2	(1)
2018	Davao Aguilas	6	(0)
2019	Tokyo 23 FC	0	(0)

International career^{‡}
2014	Philippines	1	(0)
- * Club domestic league appearances and goals as of 18 November 2014 ‡ National team caps and goals as of 18 November 2014

Satoshi Erasmo Ōtomo (大友 慧, Ōtomo Satoshi; born October 1, 1981) is a former footballer who last played for Davao Aguilas in the Philippines Football League. He previously playing for United Football League team Global. Born in Japan, he made one appearance for the Philippines national football team.

== International career ==
Otomo made his debut for the Philippines on November 9, 2014, in a friendly against Thailand in Nakhon Ratchasima as a substitute. He entered the pitch on half time.

== Personal life ==
Otomo was born to a Japanese father and a Filipino mother. His mother hails from Zamboanga.
