= Hidehiko Shimizu =

Japanese footballer and manager

Hidehiko Shimizu 清水 秀彦
Personal information
- Full name: Hidehiko Shimizu
- Date of birth: November 4, 1954 (age 71)
- Place of birth: Tokyo, Japan
- Height: 1.77 m (5 ft 9 1/2 in)
- Position: Midfielder

Youth career
- 1970–1972: Saitama Urawa High School
- 1973–1976: Hosei University

Senior career*
Years	Team	Apps	(Gls)
1977–1988	Nissan Motors		

Managerial career
- 1991–1994: Yokohama Marinos
- 1996: Avispa Fukuoka
- 1998–1999: Kyoto Purple Sanga
- 1999–2003: Vegalta Sendai
Medal record
Nissan Motors
Runner-up	Japan Soccer League	1983
Runner-up	Japan Soccer League	1984
Runner-up	JSL Cup	1983
Runner-up	JSL Cup	1985
Runner-up	JSL Cup	1986
Winner	Emperor's Cup	1983
Winner	Emperor's Cup	1985
- * Club domestic league appearances and goals

Hidehiko Shimizu (清水 秀彦, Shimizu Hidehiko; born November 4, 1954) is a former Japanese football player and manager.

== Playing career ==
Shimizu was born in Tokyo on November 4, 1954. After graduating from Hosei University, he joined Nissan Motors in 1977. He retired in 1988.

== Coaching career ==
After retirement, Shimizu became an assistant coach at Nissan Motors (later Yokohama Marinos) in 1989. In 1991, he was promoted to manager and managed until 1994. In 1996, he signed with Avispa Fukuoka. In 1998, he became an assistant coach for Kyoto Purple Sanga. In June, he was promoted to manager, but he was sacked in June 1999. In August 1999, he became a manager for J2 League club Vegalta Sendai. In 2001 season, he led to the 2nd place and the club was promoted to J1 League. In September 2003, he was sacked.

== Managerial statistics ==
Team	From	To	Record				
Team	From	To	G	W	D	L	Win %
Yokohama Marinos	1993	1994	80	43	0	37	53.75
Avispa Fukuoka	1996	1996	30	9	0	21	30.00
Kyoto Purple Sanga	1998	1999	37	16	0	21	43.24
Vegalta Sendai	1999	2003	152	67	17	68	44.08
Total			299	135	17	147	45.15
