= 2009 Kawasaki Frontale season =

Kawasaki Frontale
2009 season
- Manager: Takashi Sekizuka
- Stadium: Todoroki Athletics Stadium
- J. League 1: Runners-up
- Emperor's Cup: Quarterfinals
- J. League Cup: Runners-up
- Top goalscorer: Juninho (17)

2009 Kawasaki Frontale season

== Competitions ==
Competitions	Position
J. League 1	Runners-up / 18 clubs
Emperor's Cup	Quarterfinals
J. League Cup	Runners-up

== Player statistics ==
No.	Pos.	Player	D.o.B. (Age)	Height / Weight	J. League 1		Emperor's Cup		J. League Cup		Total	
No.	Pos.	Player	D.o.B. (Age)	Height / Weight	Apps	Goals	Apps	Goals	Apps	Goals	Apps	Goals
1	GK	Eiji Kawashima	March 20, 1983 (aged 25)	cm / kg	34	0						
2	DF	Hiroki Ito	July 27, 1978 (aged 30)	cm / kg	31	1						
4	DF	Yusuke Igawa	October 30, 1982 (aged 26)	cm / kg	22	0						
5	DF	Jun Sonoda	January 23, 1989 (aged 20)	cm / kg	3	0						
6	MF	Yusuke Tasaka	July 8, 1985 (aged 23)	cm / kg	24	2						
7	FW	Masaru Kurotsu	August 20, 1982 (aged 26)	cm / kg	16	1						
8	MF	Satoru Yamagishi	May 3, 1983 (aged 25)	cm / kg	16	0						
9	FW	Chong Te-Se	March 2, 1984 (aged 25)	cm / kg	29	14						
10	FW	Juninho	September 15, 1977 (aged 31)	cm / kg	33	17						
11	MF	Vitor Júnior	September 15, 1986 (aged 22)	cm / kg	13	3						
13	DF	Shuhei Terada	June 23, 1975 (aged 33)	cm / kg	23	0						
14	MF	Kengo Nakamura	October 31, 1980 (aged 28)	cm / kg	32	4						
15	FW	Takuro Yajima	March 28, 1984 (aged 24)	cm / kg	14	2						
16	FW	Satoshi Kukino	April 16, 1987 (aged 21)	cm / kg	4	0						
17	MF	Kosuke Kikuchi	December 16, 1985 (aged 23)	cm / kg	22	1						
18	DF	Tomonobu Yokoyama	March 18, 1985 (aged 23)	cm / kg	26	0						
19	DF	Yusuke Mori	July 24, 1980 (aged 28)	cm / kg	30	0						
20	MF	Yuji Yabu	May 24, 1984 (aged 24)	cm / kg	8	1						
21	GK	Takashi Aizawa	January 5, 1982 (aged 27)	cm / kg	0	0						
22	MF	Yuji Kimura	October 5, 1987 (aged 21)	cm / kg	2	0						
23	MF	Kyohei Noborizato	November 13, 1990 (aged 18)	cm / kg	2	1						
24	MF	Kyohei Sugiura	January 11, 1989 (aged 20)	cm / kg	0	0						
25	DF	Yuki Yoshida	May 3, 1989 (aged 19)	cm / kg	0	0						
26	MF	Kazuhiro Murakami	January 20, 1981 (aged 28)	cm / kg	28	0						
27	GK	Shunsuke Ando	August 10, 1990 (aged 18)	cm / kg	0	0						
28	GK	Rikihiro Sugiyama	May 1, 1987 (aged 21)	cm / kg	0	0						
29	MF	Hiroyuki Taniguchi	June 27, 1985 (aged 23)	cm / kg	32	8						
30	MF	Jumpei Kusukami	August 27, 1987 (aged 21)	cm / kg	1	0						
34	FW	Renatinho	May 14, 1987 (aged 21)	cm / kg	29	9						

== Other pages ==
- (in Japanese) J. League official site
