= Yusuke Igawa =

Japanese footballer (born 1982)

Yusuke Igawa 井川 祐輔
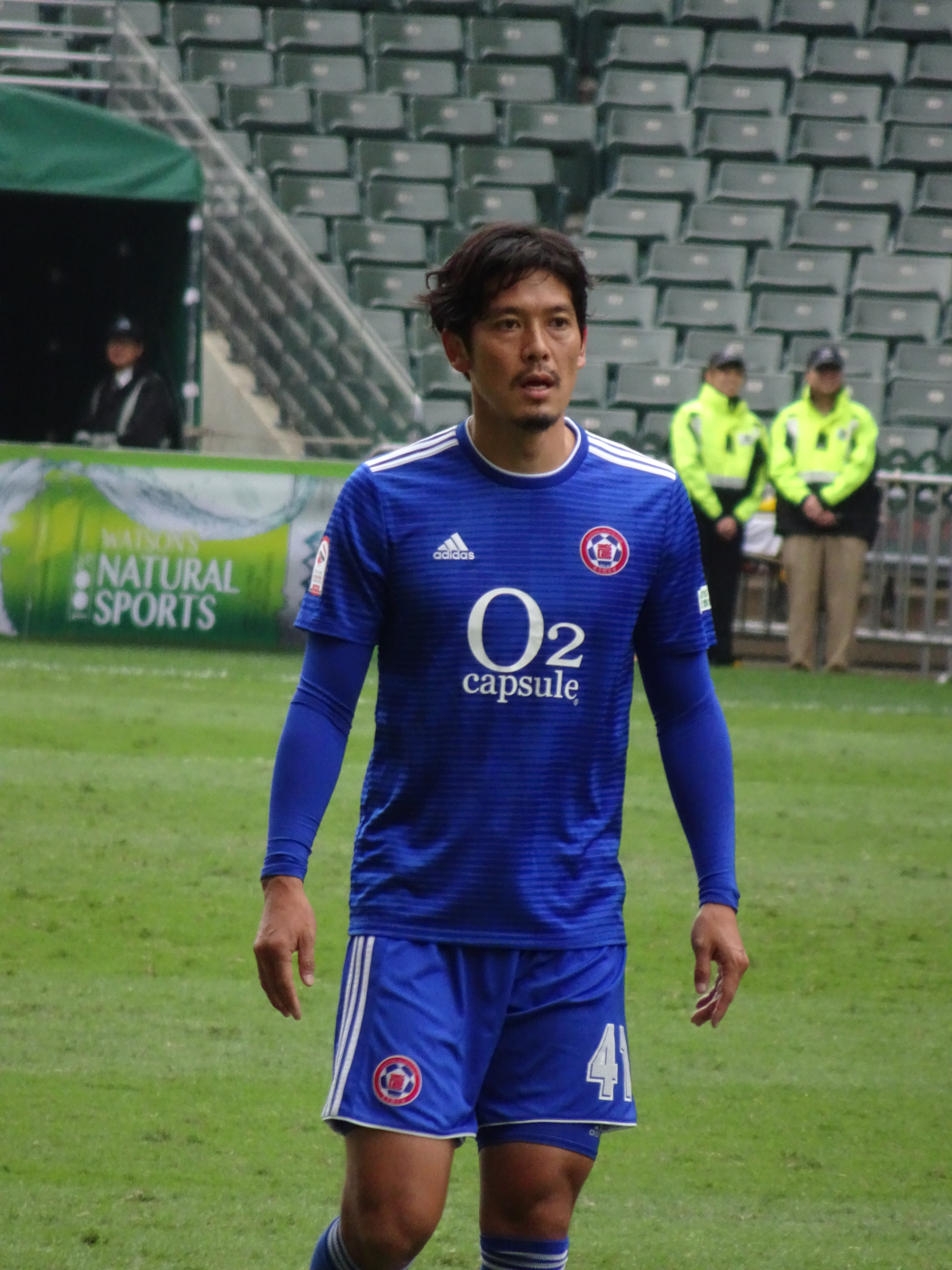

Personal information
- Full name: Yusuke Igawa
- Date of birth: October 30, 1982 (age 44)
- Place of birth: Osaka, Osaka, Japan
- Height: 1.82 m (5 ft 11 1/2 in)
- Position: Defender

Team information
- Current team: Lansbury (Head coach)

Youth career
- 1995–2000: Gamba Osaka

Senior career*
| Years | Team | Apps | (Gls) |
| 2001–2003 | Gamba Osaka | 1 | (0) |
| 2003–2004 | Sanfrecce Hiroshima | 21 | (1) |
| 2004–2005 | Nagoya Grampus Eight | 23 | (0) |
| 2006–2017 | Kawasaki Frontale | 229 | (3) |
| 2018–2019 | Eastern | 15 | (1) |
| Total | | 289 | (5) |

Managerial career
- 2019–2020: Lansbury
Medal record
Kawasaki Frontale
| Winner | J1 League | 2017 |
| Runner-up | J1 League | 2006 |
| Runner-up | J1 League | 2008 |
| Runner-up | J1 League | 2009 |
| Runner-up | J.League Cup | 2007 |
| Runner-up | J.League Cup | 2009 |
| Runner-up | J.League Cup | 2017 |
| Runner-up | Emperor's Cup | 2016 |
- * Club domestic league appearances and goals as of May 13, 2018

Yusuke Igawa (井川 祐輔, Igawa Yūsuke; born October 30, 1982) is a former Japanese football player who last played for Hong Kong Premier League club Eastern.

== Playing career ==
Igawa was born in Osaka on October 30, 1982. He joined J1 League club Gamba Osaka from youth team in 2001. Although he debuted in 2001, he could hardly play in the match until 2003. In August 2003, he moved to J2 League club Sanfrecce Hiroshima. He became a regular player immediately as right back of three back defense and the club was promoted to J1 from 2004. In 2005, although he played as regular player initially, he lost his regular position from May. In July 2004, he moved to J1 club Nagoya Grampus Eight. Although he played many matches in 2004, his opportunity to play decreased in 2005. In 2006, he moved to J1 club Kawasaki Frontale. He played many matches as center back for the club for a long time and the club won the 2nd place 2006, 2008 and 2009 J1 League. The club also won the 2nd place 2007, 2009 Emperor's Cup and 2016 J.League Cup. In 2017, although the club won the champions in J1 League first major title in the club history, he could not play at all in the match.

In January 2018, Igawa moved to Hong Kong Premier League club Eastern. Due to a contractual dispute with Eastern, he left the club on 8 February 2019. He stayed in Hong Kong after leaving Eastern and he retired at the end of the season.

In August 2019, Igawa became the head coach of Hong Kong Third Division club Lansbury.

== Club statistics ==
Updated to 13 May 2018.

| Club performance | | | League | | Cup | | League Cup | | Continental | | Total | |
| Season | Club | League | Apps | Goals | Apps | Goals | Apps | Goals | Apps | Goals | Apps | Goals |
| Japan | | | League | | Emperor's Cup | | J.League Cup | | Asia | | Total | |
|---|---|---|---|---|---|---|---|---|---|---|---|---|
| 2001 | Gamba Osaka | J1 League | 1 | 0 | 1 | 0 | 0 | 0 | - | | 2 | 0 |
| 2002 | Gamba Osaka | J1 League | 0 | 0 | 0 | 0 | 0 | 0 | - | | 0 | 0 |
| 2003 | Gamba Osaka | J1 League | 0 | 0 | 0 | 0 | 1 | 0 | - | | 1 | 0 |
| 2003 | Sanfrecce Hiroshima | J2 League | 15 | 1 | 3 | 0 | - | | - | | 18 | 1 |
| 2004 | Sanfrecce Hiroshima | J1 League | 6 | 0 | 0 | 0 | 2 | 0 | - | | 8 | 0 |
| 2004 | Nagoya Grampus Eight | J1 League | 11 | 0 | 0 | 0 | 3 | 1 | - | | 14 | 1 |
| 2005 | Nagoya Grampus Eight | J1 League | 12 | 0 | 1 | 0 | 4 | 0 | - | | 17 | 0 |
| 2006 | Kawasaki Frontale | J1 League | 22 | 0 | 0 | 0 | 4 | 0 | - | | 26 | 0 |
| 2007 | Kawasaki Frontale | J1 League | 19 | 1 | 3 | 0 | 4 | 0 | 5 | 0 | 31 | 1 |
| 2008 | Kawasaki Frontale | J1 League | 30 | 1 | 2 | 0 | 3 | 0 | - | | 35 | 1 |
| 2009 | Kawasaki Frontale | J1 League | 22 | 0 | 4 | 1 | 2 | 0 | 7 | 0 | 35 | 1 |
| 2010 | Kawasaki Frontale | J1 League | 21 | 0 | 0 | 0 | 0 | 0 | 3 | 0 | 24 | 0 |
| 2011 | Kawasaki Frontale | J1 League | 28 | 1 | 1 | 0 | 2 | 0 | - | | 31 | 1 |
| 2012 | Kawasaki Frontale | J1 League | 21 | 0 | 3 | 0 | 2 | 0 | - | | 26 | 0 |
| 2013 | Kawasaki Frontale | J1 League | 14 | 0 | 2 | 0 | 1 | 0 | - | | 17 | 0 |
| 2014 | Kawasaki Frontale | J1 League | 16 | 0 | 1 | 0 | 1 | 0 | 3 | 0 | 21 | 0 |
| 2015 | Kawasaki Frontale | J1 League | 23 | 0 | 0 | 0 | 4 | 0 | - | | 27 | 0 |
| 2016 | Kawasaki Frontale | J1 League | 13 | 0 | 0 | 0 | 3 | 0 | - | | 16 | 0 |
| 2017 | Kawasaki Frontale | J1 League | 0 | 0 | 0 | 0 | 0 | 0 | 2 | 0 | 2 | 0 |
| Hong Kong | | | League | | Hong Kong FA Cup | | Senior Shield & Sapling Cup | | Asia | | Total | |
| 2017–18 | Eastern | Hong Kong Premier League | 10 | 1 | 1 | 0 | 1 | 0 | 1 | 0 | 13 | 1 |
| 2018-19 | Eastern | Hong Kong Premier League | 5 | 0 | 0 | 0 | 1 | 0 | 0 | 0 | 6 | 0 |
| Career total | | | 289 | 5 | 22 | 1 | 38 | 1 | 21 | 0 | 370 | 7 |
