= 2010 Kawasaki Frontale season =

Kawasaki Frontale
2010 season
- Manager: Tsutomu Takahata
- Stadium: Todoroki Athletics Stadium
- J. League 1: 5th
- Emperor's Cup: 4th Round
- J. League Cup: Semifinals
- Top goalscorer: Juninho (14)

The 2010 Kawasaki Frontale season was their sixth consecutive season in J.League 1, the top division of football in Japan.

== Competitions ==
Competitions	Position
J. League 1	5th / 18 clubs
Emperor's Cup	4th Round
J. League Cup	Semifinals

=== J. League 1 ===
Pos	Team	Pld	W	D	L	GF	GA	GD	Pts	Qualification or relegation
3	Cerezo Osaka	34	17	10	7	58	32	+26	61	Qualification for 2011 AFC Champions League group stage (Note: Kashima Antlers qualified as 2010 Emperor's Cup winners.)
4	Kashima Antlers	34	16	12	6	51	31	+20	60	Qualification for 2011 AFC Champions League group stage
5	Kawasaki Frontale	34	15	9	10	61	47	+14	54	
6	Shimizu S-Pulse	34	15	9	10	60	49	+11	54	
7	Sanfrecce Hiroshima	34	14	9	11	45	38	+7	51	

Updated to match(es) played on December 4, 2010. Source: J.League Division 1
Rules for classification: 1) points; 2) goal difference; 3) number of goals scored.

== Player statistics ==
No.	Pos.	Player	D.o.B. (Age)	Height / Weight	J. League 1		Emperor's Cup		J. League Cup		Total	
No.	Pos.	Player	D.o.B. (Age)	Height / Weight	Apps	Goals	Apps	Goals	Apps	Goals	Apps	Goals
1	GK	Eiji Kawashima	March 20, 1983 (aged 26)	cm / kg	11	0						
2	DF	Hiroki Ito	July 27, 1978 (aged 31)	cm / kg	23	0						
3	DF	Hideki Sahara	May 15, 1978 (aged 31)	cm / kg	7	0						
4	DF	Yusuke Igawa	October 30, 1982 (aged 27)	cm / kg	21	0						
5	DF	Jun Sonoda	January 23, 1989 (aged 21)	cm / kg	3	0						
6	MF	Yusuke Tasaka	July 8, 1985 (aged 24)	cm / kg	27	3						
7	FW	Masaru Kurotsu	August 20, 1982 (aged 27)	cm / kg	33	8						
8	DF	Takanobu Komiyama	October 3, 1984 (aged 25)	cm / kg	33	3						
9	FW	Chong Te-Se	March 2, 1984 (aged 26)	cm / kg	10	5						
10	FW	Juninho	September 15, 1977 (aged 32)	cm / kg	19	14						
11	MF	Vitor Júnior	September 15, 1986 (aged 23)	cm / kg	29	7						
13	DF	Shuhei Terada	June 23, 1975 (aged 34)	cm / kg	10	0						
14	MF	Kengo Nakamura	October 31, 1980 (aged 29)	cm / kg	27	4						
15	FW	Takuro Yajima	March 28, 1984 (aged 25)	cm / kg	12	4						
16	MF	Jumpei Kusukami	August 27, 1987 (aged 22)	cm / kg	22	3						
17	MF	Kosuke Kikuchi	December 16, 1985 (aged 24)	cm / kg	23	0						
18	DF	Tomonobu Yokoyama	March 18, 1985 (aged 24)	cm / kg	24	0						
19	DF	Yusuke Mori	July 24, 1980 (aged 29)	cm / kg	25	2						
20	MF	Junichi Inamoto	September 18, 1979 (aged 30)	cm / kg	28	0						
21	GK	Takashi Aizawa	January 5, 1982 (aged 28)	cm / kg	23	0						
22	MF	Yuji Kimura	October 5, 1987 (aged 22)	cm / kg	5	0						
23	MF	Kyohei Noborizato	November 13, 1990 (aged 19)	cm / kg	9	0						
24	FW	Yu Kobayashi	September 23, 1987 (aged 22)	cm / kg	6	0						
25	DF	Yuki Yoshida	May 3, 1989 (aged 20)	cm / kg	0	0						
26	FW	Hidenobu Takasu	November 29, 1991 (aged 18)	cm / kg	0	0						
27	GK	Shunsuke Ando	August 10, 1990 (aged 19)	cm / kg	0	0						
28	GK	Rikihiro Sugiyama	May 1, 1987 (aged 22)	cm / kg	1	0						
29	MF	Hiroyuki Taniguchi	June 27, 1985 (aged 24)	cm / kg	27	1						
34	FW	Renatinho	May 14, 1987 (aged 22)	cm / kg	15	7						

== Other pages ==
- (in Japanese) J. League official site
