= 2008 Kawasaki Frontale season =

Kawasaki Frontale
2008 season
- Manager: Takashi Sekizuka; Tsutomu Takahata
- Stadium: Todoroki Athletics Stadium
- J. League 1: Runners-up
- Emperor's Cup: 5th Round
- J. League Cup: GL-C 3rd
- Top goalscorer: Jong Tae-Se (16)

2008 Kawasaki Frontale season

== Competitions ==
Competitions	Position
J. League 1	Runners-up / 18 clubs
Emperor's Cup	5th Round
J. League Cup	GL-C 3rd / 4 clubs

== Domestic results ==
=== J. League 1 ===
Match	Date	Venue	Opponents	Score
1	2008..			-
2	2008..			-
3	2008..			-
4	2008..			-
5	2008..			-
6	2008..			-
7	2008..			-
8	2008..			-
9	2008..			-
10	2008..			-
11	2008..			-
12	2008..			-
13	2008..			-
14	2008..			-
15	2008..			-
16	2008..			-
17	2008..			-
18	2008..			-
19	2008..			-
20	2008..			-
21	2008..			-
22	2008..			-
23	2008..			-
24	2008..			-
25	2008..			-
26	2008..			-
27	2008..			-
28	2008..			-
29	2008..			-
30	2008..			-
31	2008..			-
32	2008..			-
33	2008..			-
34	2008..			-

=== Emperor's Cup ===
Match	Date	Venue	Opponents	Score
4th Round	2008..			-
5th Round	2008..			-

=== J. League Cup ===
Match	Date	Venue	Opponents	Score
GL-C-1	2008..			-
GL-C-2	2008..			-
GL-C-3	2008..			-
GL-C-4	2008..			-
GL-C-5	2008..			-
GL-C-6	2008..			-

== Player statistics ==
No.	Pos.	Player	D.o.B. (Age)	Height / Weight	J. League 1		Emperor's Cup		J. League Cup		Total	
No.	Pos.	Player	D.o.B. (Age)	Height / Weight	Apps	Goals	Apps	Goals	Apps	Goals	Apps	Goals
1	GK	Eiji Kawashima	March 20, 1983 (aged 24)	cm / kg	34	0						
2	DF	Hiroki Ito	July 27, 1978 (aged 29)	cm / kg	34	2						
4	DF	Yusuke Igawa	October 30, 1982 (aged 25)	cm / kg	30	1						
5	DF	Yoshinobu Minowa	June 2, 1976 (aged 31)	cm / kg	0	0						
6	MF	Yusuke Tasaka	July 8, 1985 (aged 22)	cm / kg	12	1						
7	FW	Masaru Kurotsu	August 20, 1982 (aged 25)	cm / kg	26	3						
8	MF	Satoru Yamagishi	May 3, 1983 (aged 24)	cm / kg	29	0						
9	FW	Kazuki Ganaha	September 26, 1980 (aged 27)	cm / kg	15	2						
10	FW	Juninho	September 15, 1977 (aged 30)	cm / kg	32	12						
11	FW	Hulk	July 25, 1986 (aged 21)	cm / kg	2	0						
11	MF	Vitor Júnior	September 15, 1986 (aged 21)	cm / kg	15	2						
13	DF	Shuhei Terada	June 23, 1975 (aged 32)	cm / kg	21	1						
14	MF	Kengo Nakamura	October 31, 1980 (aged 27)	cm / kg	34	4						
15	MF	Taku Harada	October 27, 1982 (aged 25)	cm / kg	2	0						
16	FW	Chong Te-Se	March 2, 1984 (aged 24)	cm / kg	33	14						
17	MF	Kosuke Kikuchi	December 16, 1985 (aged 22)	cm / kg	17	0						
18	DF	Tomonobu Yokoyama	March 18, 1985 (aged 22)	cm / kg	16	0						
19	DF	Yusuke Mori	July 24, 1980 (aged 27)	cm / kg	17	3						
20	MF	Yuji Yabu	May 24, 1984 (aged 23)	cm / kg	4	0						
21	GK	Shinya Yoshihara	April 19, 1978 (aged 29)	cm / kg	0	0						
22	GK	Yuki Uekusa	July 2, 1982 (aged 25)	cm / kg	0	0						
23	FW	Satoshi Kukino	April 16, 1987 (aged 20)	cm / kg	6	1						
24	MF	Masahiro Ōhashi	June 23, 1981 (aged 26)	cm / kg	21	1						
25	MF	Tatsuya Suzuki	February 29, 1988 (aged 20)	cm / kg	0	0						
26	MF	Kazuhiro Murakami	January 20, 1981 (aged 27)	cm / kg	25	1						
27	FW	Ken Tokura	June 16, 1986 (aged 21)	cm / kg	1	0						
28	GK	Rikihiro Sugiyama	May 1, 1987 (aged 20)	cm / kg	0	0						
29	MF	Hiroyuki Taniguchi	June 27, 1985 (aged 22)	cm / kg	31	10						
30	MF	Yuji Kimura	October 5, 1987 (aged 20)	cm / kg	0	0						
31	MF	Kyohei Sugiura	January 11, 1989 (aged 19)	cm / kg	1	0						
32	DF	Yuki Yoshida	May 3, 1989 (aged 18)	cm / kg	0	0						
33	DF	Jun Sonoda	January 23, 1989 (aged 19)	cm / kg	0	0						
34	FW	Renatinho	May 14, 1987 (aged 20)	cm / kg	12	5						

== Other pages ==
- (in Japanese) J. League official site
