= Hiroki Ito (footballer, born 1978) =

Japanese footballer

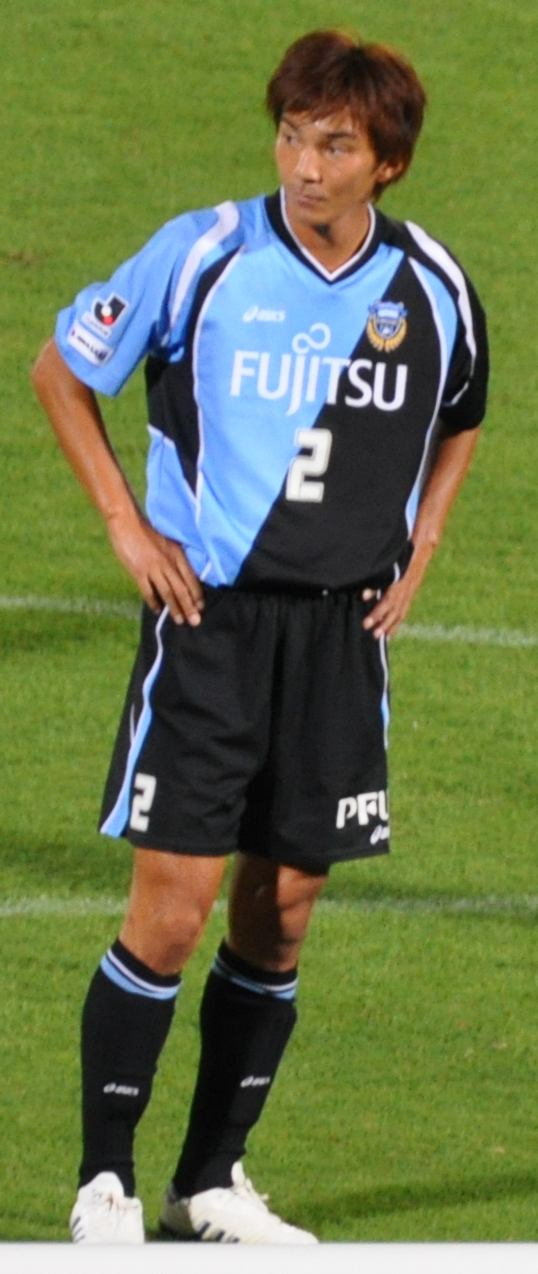

Personal information
- Full name: Hiroki Ito
- Date of birth: July 27, 1978 (age 48)
- Place of birth: Niihama, Ehime, Japan
- Height: 1.83 m (6 ft 0 in)
- Position: Defender

Youth career
- 1994–1996: Niihama Technical High School
- 1997–2000: Ritsumeikan University

Senior career*
Years	Team	Apps	(Gls)
2001–2013	Kawasaki Frontale	390	(9)
Total		390	(9)
Medal record
Kawasaki Frontale
Runner-up	J1 League	2006
Runner-up	J1 League	2008
Runner-up	J1 League	2009
Runner-up	J.League Cup	2007
Runner-up	J.League Cup	2009
- * Club domestic league appearances and goals

Hiroki Ito (伊藤 宏樹, Itō Hiroki; born July 27, 1978) is a former Japanese football player.

== Playing career ==
Ito was born in Niihama on July 27, 1978. After graduating from Ritsumeikan University, he joined J2 League club Kawasaki Frontale in 2001. He became a regular player as center back of three backs defense from first season and played as regular player for about 10 years. Frontale won the champions in 2004 J2 League and was promoted to J1 League. Frontale won the 2nd place in 2006, 2008 and 2009 season. However his opportunity to play decreased from 2011 season. He retired at the end of the 2013 season. He spent his entire professional career with Frontale, appearing in 496 official games for the club and scoring 12 goals.

== Club statistics ==
Club performance			League		Cup		League Cup		Continental		Total	
Season	Club	League	Apps	Goals	Apps	Goals	Apps	Goals	Apps	Goals	Apps	Goals
Japan			League		Emperor's Cup		J.League Cup		Asia		Total	
2001	Kawasaki Frontale	J2 League	43	1	6	0	4	0	-		53	1
2002	Kawasaki Frontale	J2 League	44	3	5	0	-		-		49	3
2003	Kawasaki Frontale	J2 League	32	1	4	1	-		-		36	2
2004	Kawasaki Frontale	J2 League	35	0	1	1	-		-		36	1
2005	Kawasaki Frontale	J1 League	34	0	3	0	6	0	-		43	0
2006	Kawasaki Frontale	J1 League	34	0	2	0	10	0	-		46	0
2007	Kawasaki Frontale	J1 League	33	0	4	0	5	1	7	0	49	1
2008	Kawasaki Frontale	J1 League	34	2	2	0	6	0	-		42	2
2009	Kawasaki Frontale	J1 League	31	1	3	0	5	0	8	0	47	1
2010	Kawasaki Frontale	J1 League	23	0	2	0	4	0	6	0	35	0
2011	Kawasaki Frontale	J1 League	10	0	3	0	1	0	-		14	0
2012	Kawasaki Frontale	J1 League	14	1	0	0	3	0	-		17	1
2013	Kawasaki Frontale	J1 League	23	0	2	0	4	0	-		29	0
Career total			390	9	37	2	48	1	21	0	496	12
