= Yusuke Mori =

Japanese footballer (born 1980)

Yusuke Mori 森 勇介
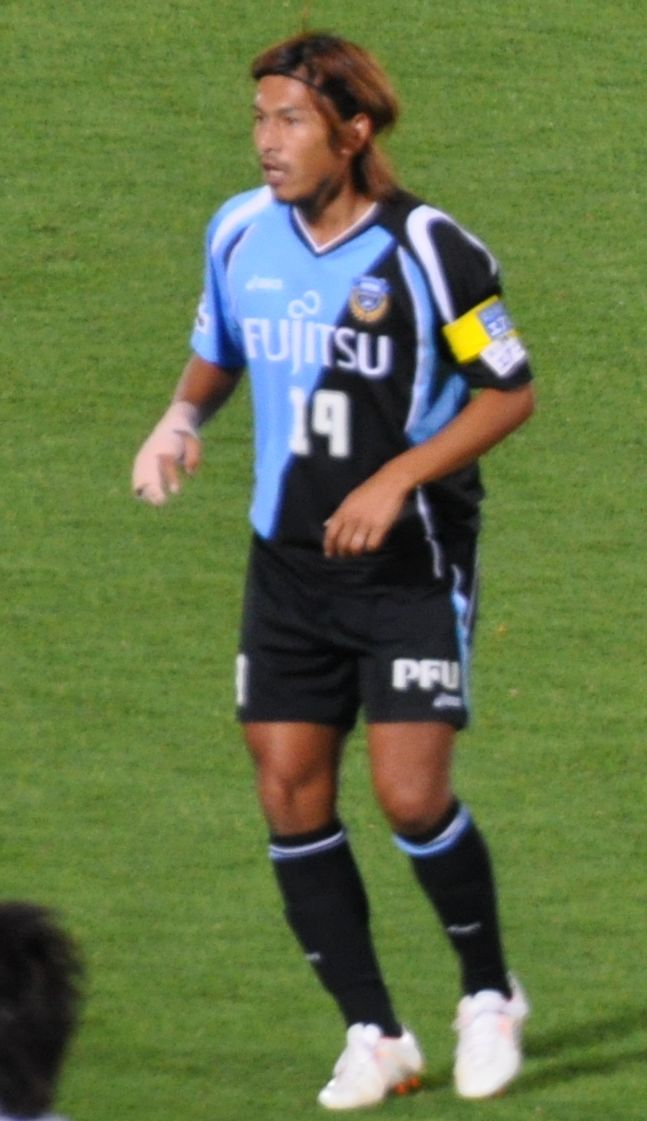

Personal information
- Date of birth: July 24, 1980 (age 46)
- Place of birth: Shizuoka, Japan
- Height: 1.75 m (5 ft 9 in)
- Position: Defender

Youth career
- 1996–1998: Shimizu Higashi High School

Senior career*
Years	Team	Apps	(Gls)
1999–2000	Verdy Kawasaki	6	(0)
2001–2002	Vegalta Sendai	40	(1)
2002–2004	Kyoto Purple Sanga	30	(0)
2005–2010	Kawasaki Frontale	133	(6)
2011–2014	Tokyo Verdy	112	(5)
2014	FC Gifu	10	(0)
2015	SC Sagamihara	20	(0)
2016–2018	Okinawa SV		
Total		351	(12)
Medal record
Kyoto Purple Sanga
Winner	Emperor's Cup	2002
Kawasaki Frontale
Runner-up	J1 League	2006
Runner-up	J1 League	2008
Runner-up	J1 League	2009
Runner-up	J.League Cup	2007
Runner-up	J.League Cup	2009
- * Club domestic league appearances and goals

Yusuke Mori (森 勇介, Mori Yusuke; born July 24, 1980) is a Japanese former professional footballer who played as a defender.

== Career ==
Mori was born in Shizuoka on July 24, 1980. After graduating from Shimizu Higashi High School, he joined J1 League club Verdy Kawasaki (later Tokyo Verdy) in 1999. Although he played several matches as right side back, he could not play many matches. In 2001, he moved to J2 League club Vegalta Sendai. He played many matches as regular player and the club was promoted to J1 from 2002. In August 2002, he moved to Kyoto Purple Sanga. Although he could not become a regular player, he played many matches until 2004. In 2005, he moved to newly was promoted to J1 League club, Kawasaki Frontale. He became a regular player as right side back and right side midfielder for a long time. The club also won the 2nd place 2007 and 2009 J.League Cup. In 2011, he moved to his first club Tokyo Verdy for the first time in 11 years. He played many matches as regular right side back. However his opportunity to play decreased in 2014. In 2014, he moved to J2 club FC Gifu. In 2015, he moved to J3 League club SC Sagamihara. He left the club end of 2015 season.

In 2016, Mori joined Okinawa SV. The club announced in November 2018, that Mori would leave the club at the end of the year.

== Career statistics ==
Appearances and goals by club, season and competition
Club	Season	League			Emperor's Cup		J.League Cup		Asia		Total	
Club	Season	Division	Apps	Goals	Apps	Goals	Apps	Goals	Apps	Goals	Apps	Goals
Verdy Kawasaki	1999	J1 League	1	0	2	0	0	0	—		3	0
Verdy Kawasaki	2000	J1 League	5	0	0	0	1	0	—		6	0
Vegalta Sendai	2001	J2 League	29	1	0	0	2	0	—		31	1
Vegalta Sendai	2002	J1 League	11	0	0	0	4	0	—		15	0
Kyoto Purple Sanga	2002	J1 League	1	0	0	0	0	0	—		1	0
Kyoto Purple Sanga	2003	J1 League	11	0	0	0	4	1	—		15	1
Kyoto Purple Sanga	2004	J2 League	18	0	0	0	—		—		18	0
Kawasaki Frontale	2005	J1 League	3	0	3	0	1	0	—		7	0
Kawasaki Frontale	2006	J1 League	28	0	2	0	7	0	—		37	0
Kawasaki Frontale	2007	J1 League	30	1	4	2	5	0	6	0	45	3
Kawasaki Frontale	2008	J1 League	17	3	2	0	4	0	—		23	3
Kawasaki Frontale	2009	J1 League	30	0	1	0	4	0	7	0	42	0
Kawasaki Frontale	2010	J1 League	25	2	3	0	4	0	6	0	38	2
Tokyo Verdy	2011	J2 League	30	1	1	0	—		—		31	1
Tokyo Verdy	2012	J2 League	39	2	1	0	—		—		40	2
Tokyo Verdy	2013	J2 League	38	2	1	0	—		—		39	2
Tokyo Verdy	2014	J2 League	5	0	0	0	—		—		5	0
FC Gifu	2014	J2 League	10	0	0	0	—		—		10	0
SC Sagamihara	2015	J3 League	20	0	—		—		—		20	0
Career total			351	12	20	2	36	1	19	0	426	15
