= 2012 Kawasaki Frontale season =

Kawasaki Frontale
2012 season
- Chairman: Shimpei Takeda
- Manager: Naoki Soma
- J. League Division 1: –
- Emperor's Cup: –
- J. League Cup: –
Home colours	Away colours	Third colours

The 2012 Kawasaki Frontale season was Kawasaki Frontale's eighth consecutive season in J. League Division 1 and 11th overall in the Japanese top flight. Kawasaki Frontale also competed in the 2012 Emperor's Cup and 2012 J. League Cup.

== Competitions ==
=== J. League ===
==== League table ====
Pos	Team	Pld	W	D	L	GF	GA	GD	Pts	Qualification or relegation
1	Sanfrecce Hiroshima (C)	34	19	7	8	63	34	+29	64	Qualification to 2012 Club World Cup and 2013 Champions League
2	Vegalta Sendai	34	15	12	7	59	43	+16	57	Qualification to 2013 Champions League (Note: The winners of the 2012 Emperor's Cup qualified for the group stage of the 2013 AFC Champions League.)
3	Urawa Red Diamonds	34	15	10	9	47	42	+5	55	Qualification to 2013 Champions League
4	Yokohama F. Marinos	34	13	14	7	44	33	+11	53	
5	Sagan Tosu	34	15	8	11	48	39	+9	53	
6	Kashiwa Reysol	34	15	7	12	57	52	+5	52	Qualification to 2013 Champions League
7	Nagoya Grampus	34	15	7	12	46	47	−1	52	
8	Kawasaki Frontale	34	14	8	12	51	50	+1	50	
9	Shimizu S-Pulse	34	14	7	13	39	40	−1	49	
10	FC Tokyo	34	14	6	14	47	44	+3	48	
11	Kashima Antlers	34	12	10	12	50	43	+7	46	
12	Júbilo Iwata	34	13	7	14	57	53	+4	46	
13	Omiya Ardija	34	11	11	12	38	45	−7	44	
14	Cerezo Osaka	34	11	9	14	47	53	−6	42	
15	Albirex Niigata	34	10	10	14	29	34	−5	40	
16	Vissel Kobe (R)	34	11	6	17	41	50	−9	39	Relegation to 2013 J.League Division 2
17	Gamba Osaka (R)	34	9	11	14	67	65	+2	38	Relegation to 2013 J.League Division 2
18	Consadole Sapporo (R)	34	4	2	28	25	88	−63	14	Relegation to 2013 J.League Division 2

Updated to match(es) played on 1 December 2012. Source: J.League Division 1
Rules for classification: 1) points; 2) goal difference; 3) number of goals scored.
(C) Champions; (R) Relegated

==== Matches ====
10 March 2012 1	Kawasaki Frontale	1–0	Albirex Niigata	Todoroki Stadium
Saturday 17:05	Saneto 11'	Report		Attendance: 18,920; Referee: Yamamoto

17 March 2012 2	Kashima Antlers	0–1	Kawasaki Frontale	Kashima Soccer Stadium
Saturday 14:04		Report	45+2' Renato	Attendance: 19,010; Referee: Nishimura

24 March 2012 3	Kawasaki Frontale	0–1	Cerezo Osaka	Kawasaki Todoroki Stadium
Saturday 14:04		Report	75' Kim	Attendance: 14,777; Referee: Matsuo

31 March 2012 4	Urawa Red Diamonds	1–1	Kawasaki Frontale	Saitama Stadium 2002
Saturday 15:03	Popó 10'	Report	59' Yajima	Attendance: 25,743; Referee: Iemoto

8 April 2012 5	Kawasaki Frontale	0–1	F.C. Tokyo	Kawasaki Todoroki Stadium
Sunday 17:00	Renatinho (yellow card) 50'	Report	Hasegawa (yellow card) 43' (yellow-red card) 48'; Takahashi (yellow card) 45+2'; Morishige 87'	Attendance: 20,996; Referee: (Japan) Kenji Ogiya

14 April 2012 6	Gamba Osaka	3–2	Kawasaki Frontale	Osaka Expo '70 Stadium
Saturday 20:00	Endō (yellow card) 32'; Nakazawa 45+1'; Sato 68'; Abe 85'; Kaji (yellow card) 89'	Report	Tasaka 1' (yellow card) 90+3'; Kobayashi 30'; Morishita (yellow card) 36'; Komiyama (yellow card) 45'; Jeci (yellow card) 84'	Attendance: 17,134; Referee: (Japan) Hiroyuki Kimura

21 April 2012 7	Consadole Sapporo	2–3	Kawasaki Frontale	Sapporo Dome
Saturday 15:00	Maeda 9' (yellow card) 75'; Takaki 32'	Report	Nakamura 57'; Renatinho 67' (pen.); Yamase 88'	Attendance: 11,119; Referee: (Japan) Nobutsugu Murakami

28 April 2012 8	Kawasaki Frontale	1–4	Sanfrecce Hiroshima	Kawasaki Todoroki Stadium
Saturday 16:00	Ito 33'	Report	Yamagishi 15'; Ishihara 38'; Satō 47', 78'; Morisaki (yellow card) 90+3'	Attendance: 19,895; Referee: (Japan) Kazuhiko Matsumura

3 May 2012 9	Kawasaki Frontale	4–3	Júbilo Iwata	Kawasaki Todoroki Stadium
Thursday 16:00	Oshima 30'; Yajima 53' (pen.) 62'; Tanaka 55'; Igawa (yellow card) 84'	Report	Yamada (yellow card) 13'; Yamamoto (yellow card) 52' (goal) 59', 67'; Abe 90+1'	Attendance: 15,671; Referee: (Japan) Tomohiro Inoue

6 May 2012 10	Nagoya Grampus	2–3	Kawasaki Frontale	Toyota Stadium
Sunday 18:00	Kennedy 9'; Córdoba (yellow card) 45+3'; Daniel (yellow card) 54'; Fujimoto 71'; Ogawa (yellow card) 90'	Report	Tasaka 1'; Yajima 14', 45+3'	Attendance: 20,512; Referee: (Japan) Toshimitsy Yoshida

12 May 2012 11	Kawasaki Frontale	0–2	Kashiwa Reysol	Kawasaki Todoroki Stadium
Saturday 16:00		Report	Hashimoto (yellow card) 57'; Kudo 63'; Tanaka (yellow card) 74'; Jorge Wagner 90+2'	Attendance: 16,054; Referee: (Japan) Itaru Hirose

19 May 2012 12	Omiya Ardija	0–2	Kawasaki Frontale	NACK5 Stadium Omiya
Saturday 17:00	Aoki (yellow card) 35'; Carlinhos Paraíba (yellow card) 52'; Kataoka (yellow card) 83'	Report	Oshima 67'; Kusukami 72'	Attendance: 9,304; Referee: (Japan) Futoshi Nakamura

26 May 2012 13	Kawasaki Frontale	3–2	Vegalta Sendai	Kawasaki Todoroki Stadium
Saturday 15:00	Kobayashi 21'; Noborizato 61'; Yajima 90+3'	Report	Tomita 24'; Wilson 54'; Akamine (yellow card) 85'	Attendance: 16,058; Referee: (Japan) Tomoya Maeda

16 June 2012 14	Sagan Tosu	0–1	Kawasaki Frontale	Tosu Stadium
Saturday 20:00	Ikeda (yellow card) 75'	Report	Inamoto (yellow card) 27'; Ito (yellow card) 76'; Tasaka 79'; Kurotsu (yellow card) 90+5'	Attendance: 9,603; Referee: (Japan) Yoshiro Imamura

23 June 2012 15	Kawasaki Frontale	0–0	Yokohama F. Marinos	Kawasaki Todoroki Stadium
Saturday 20:00	Tanaka (yellow card) 82'; Kurotsu (yellow card) 86'	Report	Ono (yellow card) 64'; Taniguchi (yellow card) 65'	Attendance: 20,590; Referee: (Japan) Kenji Ogiya

30 June 2012 16	Kawasaki Frontale	0–1	Vissel Kobe	Kawasaki Todoroki Stadium
Saturday 20:00	Inamoto (yellow card) 23'; Yajima (yellow card) 74'	Report	Yoshida (yellow card) 64'; Tanaka (yellow card) 75'; Tokura 77' (yellow card) 77'	Attendance: 18,056; Referee: (Japan) Nobutsugu Murakami

7 July 2012 17	Shimizu S-Pulse	0–0	Kawasaki Frontale	Outsourcing Stadium Nihondaira
Saturday 19:00	Kawai (yellow card) 83'	Report		Attendance: 14,133; Referee: (Paraguay) Antonio Arias

14 July 2012 18	Sanfrecce Hiroshima	3–0	Kawasaki Frontale	Hiroshima Big Arch
Saturday 20:00	Shimizu 2'; Satō 15', 19'	Report	Kobayashi (yellow card) 40'	Attendance: 11,585; Referee: (Japan) Yudai Yamamoto

28 July 2012 19	Kawasaki Frontale	4–1	Omiya Ardija	Kawasaki Todoroki Stadium
Saturday 20:00	Nakamura 45+4'; Kobayashi 47' (pen.); Kusukami (yellow card) 51' (goal) 69'; Renatinho 71'	Report	Hasegawa 19'; Cho Young-Cheol (yellow card) 33'; Kikuchi (yellow card) 46'	Attendance: 14,716; Referee: (Japan) Toshimitsu Yoshida

4 August 2012 20	Júbilo Iwata	–	Kawasaki Frontale	Yamaha Stadium
Saturday 20:00				Referee: (Japan)

11 August 2012 21	Kawasaki Frontale	–	Sagan Tosu	Kawasaki Todoroki Stadium
Saturday 20:00				Referee: (Japan)

18 August 2012 22	Yokohama F. Marinos	–	Kawasaki Frontale	International Stadium Yokohama
Saturday 20:00				Referee: (Japan)

25 August 2012 23	Kawasaki Frontale	–	Nagoya Grampus	Kawasaki Todoroki Stadium
Saturday 20:00				Referee: (Japan)

1 September 2012 24	Vegalta Sendai	–	Kawasaki Frontale	Yurtec Stadium Sendai
Saturday 20:00				Referee: (Japan)

14 September 2012 25	Kawasaki Frontale	–	Kashima Antlers	Kawasaki Todoroki Stadium
Friday				Referee: (Japan)

21 September 2012 26	F.C. Tokyo	–	Kawasaki Frontale	Ajinomoto Stadium
Friday				Referee: (Japan)

28 September 2012 27	Kawasaki Frontale	–	Consadole Sapporo	Kawasaki Todoroki Stadium
Friday				Referee: (Japan)

5 October 2012 28	Kashiwa Reysol	–	Kawasaki Frontale	Hitachi Kashiwa Soccer Stadium
Friday				Referee: (Japan)

19 October 2012 29	Kawasaki Frontale	–	Gamba Osaka	Kawasaki Todoroki Stadium
Friday				Referee: (Japan)

26 October 2012 30	Vissel Kobe	–	Kawasaki Frontale	Home's Stadium Kobe
Friday				Referee: (Japan)

6 November 2012 31	Kawasaki Frontale	–	Urawa Red Diamonds	Kawasaki Todoroki Stadium
Friday				Referee: (Japan)

16 November 2012 32	Albirex Niigata	–	Kawasaki Frontale	Tohoku Electric Power Big Swan Stadium
Friday				Referee: (Japan)

23 November 2012 33	Kawasaki Frontale	–	Shimizu S-Pulse	Kawasaki Todoroki Stadium
Friday				Referee: (Japan)

30 November 2012 34	Cerezo Osaka	–	Kawasaki Frontale	Kincho Stadium
Friday				Referee: (Japan)

=== J. League Cup ===
Team	Pld	W	D	L	GF	GA	GD	Pts
Cerezo Osaka	6	4	0	2	15	7	+8	12
Vegalta Sendai	6	4	0	2	11	5	+4	12
Jubilo Iwata	6	4	0	2	10	11	−1	12
Urawa Red Diamonds	6	3	0	3	12	10	+2	9
Sagan Tosu	6	3	0	3	8	16	−8	9
Sanfrecce Hiroshima	6	1	1	4	8	11	−3	4
Kawasaki Frontale	6	1	1	4	7	11	−4	4

20 March 2012 Group A	Sagan Tosu	2–1	Kawasaki Frontale	Best Amenity Stadium
Tuesday 16:04	Okada 53'; Noda 65'	Report	78' Yajima	Attendance: 4,613; Referee: Tojo

4 April 2012 Group A	Sanfrecce Hiroshima	1–1	Kawasaki Frontale	Hiroshima Big Arch
Wednesday 19:04	Sato 85'	Report	58' Jeci	Attendance: 6,413; Referee: Iida

18 April 2012 Group A	Kawasaki Frontale	3–1	Vegalta Sendai	Todoroki Athletics Stadium
Wednesday 20:00	Saneto (yellow card) 27' (yellow-red card) 54'; Tasaka 45+1'; Kobayashi 45+3', 57'	Report	Tamura (yellow card) 48'; Muto (yellow card) 72' (goal) 90'	Attendance: 8,186; Referee: Hajime Matsuo

16 May 2012 Group A	Kawasaki Frontale	0–3	Urawa Red Diamonds	Todoroki Athletics Stadium
Wednesday 20:00		Report	Kashiwagi 32'; Ugajin (yellow card) 42' (goal) 57', 83'	Attendance: 13,608; Referee: Nobutsugu Murakami

6 June 2012 Group A	Cerezo Osaka	3–2	Kawasaki Frontale	Kincho Stadium
Wednesday 20:00	Ogihara (yellow card) 27'; Kempes 47' 59'; Sakemoto (yellow card) 57'; Kakitani 58', 86'; Takahashi (yellow card) 81'	Report	Kusukami 30'; Renatinho 68' (yellow card) 85'	Attendance: 6,855; Referee: Koichiro Fukushima

9 June 2012 Group A	Kawasaki Frontale	0–1	Júbilo Iwata	Todoroki Athletics Stadium
Saturday 20:00		Report	Yamazaki 25'	Attendance: 7,970; Referee: Jumpei Iida
