= 2016 Kawasaki Frontale season =

Kawasaki Frontale
2016 season
- Manager: Yahiro Kazama
- Stadium: Kawasaki Todoroki Stadium
- J1 League: 3rd

During the 2016 season, Kawasaki Frontale competed in the J. League 1, where they finished 2nd. The club also competed in the Emperor's Cup and the J. League Cup.

== J1 League ==
=== League table ===
Pos	Team	Pld	W	D	L	GF	GA	GD	Pts	Qualification or relegation
1	Urawa Red Diamonds	34	23	5	6	61	28	+33	74	Champions League group stage and J. League Championship Final
2	Kawasaki Frontale	34	22	6	6	68	39	+29	72	Champions League group stage and J. League Championship 1st Round
3	Kashima Antlers (C)	34	18	5	11	53	34	+19	59	Club World Cup, Champions League group stage and J. League Championship 1st Round
4	Gamba Osaka	34	17	7	10	53	42	+11	58	Champions League play-off round (Note: The winner of the 2016 Emperor's Cup qualified for the Group Stage of the 2017 AFC Champions League. Since the Emperor's Cup winner Kashima Antlers had already qualified for the AFC Champions League, the play-off round spot was awarded to the fourth-placed team.)
5	Omiya Ardija	34	15	11	8	41	36	+5	56	

Source: Meiji Yasuda J1 League
Rules for classification: 1) Points; 2) Goal difference; 3) Goals scored.
(C) Champions

=== Matches ===
J1 League results
Match	Date	Team	Score	Team	Venue	Attendance
1-1	2016.02.27	Sanfrecce Hiroshima	0-1	Kawasaki Frontale	Edion Stadium Hiroshima	18,120
1-2	2016.03.05	Kawasaki Frontale	4-4	Shonan Bellmare	Kawasaki Todoroki Stadium	21,871
1-3	2016.03.12	Kawasaki Frontale	3-2	Nagoya Grampus	Kawasaki Todoroki Stadium	16,513
1-4	2016.03.19	Ventforet Kofu	0-4	Kawasaki Frontale	Yamanashi Chuo Bank Stadium	9,567
1-5	2016.04.02	Kawasaki Frontale	1-1	Kashima Antlers	Kawasaki Todoroki Stadium	23,955
1-6	2016.04.10	Kawasaki Frontale	1-0	Sagan Tosu	Kawasaki Todoroki Stadium	18,402
1-7	2016.04.16	FC Tokyo	2-4	Kawasaki Frontale	Ajinomoto Stadium	29,208
1-8	2016.04.24	Kawasaki Frontale	0-1	Urawa Reds	Kawasaki Todoroki Stadium	25,450
1-9	2016.04.29	Gamba Osaka	0-1	Kawasaki Frontale	Suita City Football Stadium	33,941
1-10	2016.05.04	Kawasaki Frontale	1-1	Vegalta Sendai	Kawasaki Todoroki Stadium	23,812
1-11	2016.05.08	Kashiwa Reysol	1-3	Kawasaki Frontale	Hitachi Kashiwa Stadium	13,977
1-12	2016.05.14	Kawasaki Frontale	3-1	Vissel Kobe	Kawasaki Todoroki Stadium	20,215
1-13	2016.05.21	Albirex Niigata	0-0	Kawasaki Frontale	Denka Big Swan Stadium	18,363
1-14	2016.05.29	Kawasaki Frontale	1-0	Júbilo Iwata	Kawasaki Todoroki Stadium	21,373
1-15	2016.06.11	Yokohama F. Marinos	0-2	Kawasaki Frontale	Nissan Stadium	46,413
1-16	2016.06.18	Avispa Fukuoka	2-2	Kawasaki Frontale	Level5 Stadium	18,226
1-17	2016.06.25	Kawasaki Frontale	2-0	Omiya Ardija	Kawasaki Todoroki Stadium	26,612
2-1	2016.07.02	Vegalta Sendai	0-3	Kawasaki Frontale	Yurtec Stadium Sendai	15,415
2-2	2016.07.09	Nagoya Grampus	0-3	Kawasaki Frontale	Paloma Mizuho Stadium	16,780
2-3	2016.07.13	Kawasaki Frontale	3-2	Albirex Niigata	Kawasaki Todoroki Stadium	14,432
2-4	2016.07.17	Júbilo Iwata	1-1	Kawasaki Frontale	Yamaha Stadium	14,837
2-5	2016.07.23	Kawasaki Frontale	1-0	FC Tokyo	Kawasaki Todoroki Stadium	24,103
2-6	2016.07.30	Shonan Bellmare	2-3	Kawasaki Frontale	Shonan BMW Stadium Hiratsuka	14,096
2-7	2016.08.06	Kawasaki Frontale	4-0	Ventforet Kofu	Kawasaki Todoroki Stadium	20,016
2-8	2016.08.13	Sagan Tosu	1-0	Kawasaki Frontale	Best Amenity Stadium	19,477
2-9	2016.08.20	Urawa Reds	1-2	Kawasaki Frontale	Saitama Stadium 2002	44,176
2-10	2016.08.27	Kawasaki Frontale	2-5	Kashiwa Reysol	Kawasaki Todoroki Stadium	21,791
2-11	2016.09.10	Kawasaki Frontale	3-1	Avispa Fukuoka	Kawasaki Todoroki Stadium	23,759
2-12	2016.09.17	Omiya Ardija	3-2	Kawasaki Frontale	Kumagaya Athletic Stadium	13,787
2-13	2016.09.25	Kawasaki Frontale	3-2	Yokohama F. Marinos	Kawasaki Todoroki Stadium	25,017
2-14	2016.10.01	Vissel Kobe	3-0	Kawasaki Frontale	Noevir Stadium Kobe	25,722
2-15	2016.10.22	Kawasaki Frontale	2-0	Sanfrecce Hiroshima	Kawasaki Todoroki Stadium	23,290
2-16	2016.10.29	Kashima Antlers	0-1	Kawasaki Frontale	Kashima Soccer Stadium	24,000
2-17	2016.11.03	Kawasaki Frontale	2-3	Gamba Osaka	Kawasaki Todoroki Stadium	25,694
