= Shunsuke Andō =

Japanese footballer (born 1990)

Shunsuke Andō 安藤 駿介
Personal information
- Full name: Shunsuke Andō
- Date of birth: 10 August 1990 (age 36)
- Place of birth: Setagaya, Tokyo, Japan
- Height: 1.85 m (6 ft 1 in)
- Position: Goalkeeper

Youth career
- 1997–2002: Valor SC West
- 2003–2008: Kawasaki Frontale

Senior career*
Years	Team	Apps	(Gls)
2009–2025	Kawasaki Frontale	5	(0)
2013	→ Shonan Bellmare (loan)	10	(0)
Total		15	(0)

International career^{‡}
2010–2012	Japan U-23	10	(0)
Medal record
Kawasaki Frontale
Winner	J1 League	2017
Winner	J1 League	2018
Runner-up	J1 League	2009
Runner-up	J.League Cup	2009
Runner-up	J.League Cup	2017
Runner-up	Emperor's Cup	2016
Representing Japan
Asian Games
Gold medal – first place	2010 Guangzhou	Team
- * Club domestic league appearances and goals ‡ National team caps and goals as of 10 August 2012

Shunsuke Andō (安藤 駿介, Andō Shunsuke; born 10 August 1990) is a Japanese former footballer who played as a goalkeeper.

== National team career ==
On 23 September 2010, Ando was selected for the Japan U-23 national team squad for the 2010 Asian Games held in Guangzhou, China. In July 2012, he was elected Japan for 2012 Summer Olympics. Although he did not play in the match, as he was the team's reserve goalkeeper behind Shuichi Gonda, Japan won the 4th place.

== Club statistics ==
Appearances and goals by club, season and competition
Club	Season	League			Cup (Note: Includes Emperor's Cup)		League Cup (Note: Includes J. League Cup)		Continental (Note: Includes AFC Champions League)		Other		Total	
Club	Season	Division	Apps	Goals	Apps	Goals	Apps	Goals	Apps	Goals	Apps	Goals	Apps	Goals
Kawasaki Frontale	2009	J1 League	0	0	0	0	0	0	0	0	—		0	0
Kawasaki Frontale	2010	J1 League	0	0	0	0	0	0	0	0	—		0	0
Kawasaki Frontale	2011	J1 League	4	0	0	0	1	0	—		—		5	0
Kawasaki Frontale	2012	J1 League	1	0	0	0	2	0	—		—		3	0
Kawasaki Frontale	2014	J1 League	0	0	0	0	0	0	0	0	—		0	0
Kawasaki Frontale	2015	J1 League	0	0	0	0	0	0	—		—		0	0
Kawasaki Frontale	2016	J1 League	0	0	0	0	1	0	—		—		1	0
Kawasaki Frontale	2017	J1 League	0	0	0	0	0	0	0	0	—		0	0
Kawasaki Frontale	2018	J1 League	0	0	0	0	0	0	0	0	0	0	0	0
Kawasaki Frontale	2019	J1 League	0	0	0	0	0	0	0	0	0	0	0	0
Kawasaki Frontale	2020	J1 League	0	0	0	0	0	0	—		—		0	0
Kawasaki Frontale	2021	J1 League	0	0	0	0	0	0	0	0	0	0	0	0
Kawasaki Frontale	2022	J1 League	0	0	0	0	0	0	0	0	0	0	0	0
Kawasaki Frontale	2023	J1 League	0	0	0	0	0	0	0	0	—		0	0
Kawasaki Frontale	2024	J1 League	0	0	0	0	0	0	0	0	0	0	0	0
Kawasaki Frontale	2025	J1 League	0	0	0	0	0	0	1	0	0	0	1	0
Kawasaki Frontale	Total		5	0	0	0	4	0	1	0	0	0	10	0
Shonan Bellmare (loan)	2013	J1 League	10	0	1	0	4	0	—		—		15	0
Career total			15	0	1	0	8	0	1	0	0	0	25	0

== Honours ==
=== Kawasaki Frontale ===
- J1 League: 2017, 2018, 2020, 2021
- Japanese Super Cup: 2024

=== Japan ===
- Asian Games (1) : 2010
