= 2017 Kawasaki Frontale season =

Kawasaki Frontale
2017 season
- Manager: Toru Oniki
- Stadium: Kawasaki Todoroki Stadium
- J1 League: Champions
Home colours	Away colours

2017 Kawasaki Frontale season.

== J1 League ==
=== League table ===
Pos	Team	Pld	W	D	L	GF	GA	GD	Pts	Qualification or relegation
1	Kawasaki Frontale (C)	34	21	9	4	71	32	+39	72	Champions League group stage
2	Kashima Antlers	34	23	3	8	53	31	+22	72	Champions League group stage
3	Cerezo Osaka	34	19	6	9	65	43	+22	63	Champions League group stage
4	Kashiwa Reysol	34	18	8	8	49	33	+16	62	Champions League play-off round (Note: The winner of the 2017 Emperor's Cup qualified for the group stage of the 2018 AFC Champions League. Since the Emperor's Cup winner Cerezo Osaka had already qualified for the AFC Champions League, the play-off round spot was awarded to the fourth-placed team.)
5	Yokohama F. Marinos	34	17	8	9	45	36	+9	59	

Source: Meiji Yasuda J1 League
Rules for classification: 1) Points; 2) Goal difference; 3) Goals scored
(C) Champions

=== Match details ===
J1 League match details
Match	Date	Team	Score	Team	Venue	Attendance
1	2017.02.25	Omiya Ardija	0–2	Kawasaki Frontale	NACK5 Stadium Omiya	11,962
2	2017.03.05	Kawasaki Frontale	1–1	Sagan Tosu	Kawasaki Todoroki Stadium	22,705
3	2017.03.10	Kawasaki Frontale	2–1	Kashiwa Reysol	Kawasaki Todoroki Stadium	18,608
4	2017.03.18	FC Tokyo	3–0	Kawasaki Frontale	Ajinomoto Stadium	36,311
5	2017.04.01	Vegalta Sendai	0–2	Kawasaki Frontale	Yurtec Stadium Sendai	13,122
6	2017.04.08	Kawasaki Frontale	1-1	Ventforet Kofu	Kawasaki Todoroki Stadium	19,867
7	2017.04.16	Hokkaido Consadole Sapporo	1-1	Kawasaki Frontale	Sapporo Dome	18,155
8	2017.04.21	Kawasaki Frontale	2-2	Shimizu S-Pulse	Kawasaki Todoroki Stadium	17,358
9	2017.04.30	Cerezo Osaka	2-0	Kawasaki Frontale	Yanmar Stadium Nagai	25,738
10	2017.05.05	Kawasaki Frontale	3-0	Albirex Niigata	Kawasaki Todoroki Stadium	25,095
11	2017.05.14	Júbilo Iwata	0-2	Kawasaki Frontale	Yamaha Stadium	13,782
12	2017.05.19	Kashima Antlers	0-3	Kawasaki Frontale	Kashima Soccer Stadium	10,838
14	2017.06.04	Yokohama F. Marinos	2-0	Kawasaki Frontale	Nissan Stadium	42,483
15	2017.06.17	Kawasaki Frontale	1-0	Sanfrecce Hiroshima	Kawasaki Todoroki Stadium	23,209
16	2017.06.25	Gamba Osaka	1-1	Kawasaki Frontale	Suita City Football Stadium	24,835
17	2017.07.01	Kawasaki Frontale	5-0	Vissel Kobe	Kawasaki Todoroki Stadium	19,991
13	2017.07.05	Kawasaki Frontale	4-1	Urawa Reds	Kawasaki Todoroki Stadium	22,561
18	2017.07.08	Sagan Tosu	2-3	Kawasaki Frontale	Best Amenity Stadium	12,401
19	2017.07.29	Kawasaki Frontale	2-5	Júbilo Iwata	Kawasaki Todoroki Stadium	23,858
20	2017.08.05	Kawasaki Frontale	1-1	FC Tokyo	Kawasaki Todoroki Stadium	25,043
21	2017.08.09	Albirex Niigata	0-2	Kawasaki Frontale	Denka Big Swan Stadium	18,016
22	2017.08.13	Kawasaki Frontale	3-1	Kashima Antlers	Kawasaki Todoroki Stadium	24,008
23	2017.08.19	Kawasaki Frontale	2-1	Hokkaido Consadole Sapporo	Kawasaki Todoroki Stadium	18,342
24	2017.08.27	Ventforet Kofu	2-2	Kawasaki Frontale	Yamanashi Chuo Bank Stadium	10,807
25	2017.09.09	Kawasaki Frontale	3-0	Yokohama F. Marinos	Kawasaki Todoroki Stadium	24,715
26	2017.09.16	Shimizu S-Pulse	0-3	Kawasaki Frontale	IAI Stadium Nihondaira	13,585
27	2017.09.23	Vissel Kobe	0-0	Kawasaki Frontale	Noevir Stadium Kobe	18,111
28	2017.09.30	Kawasaki Frontale	5-1	Cerezo Osaka	Kawasaki Todoroki Stadium	24,225
29	2017.10.14	Kawasaki Frontale	3-2	Vegalta Sendai	Kawasaki Todoroki Stadium	18,892
30	2017.10.21	Sanfrecce Hiroshima	0-3	Kawasaki Frontale	Edion Stadium Hiroshima	8,319
31	2017.10.29	Kashiwa Reysol	2-2	Kawasaki Frontale	Hitachi Kashiwa Stadium	9,512
32	2017.11.18	Kawasaki Frontale	1-0	Gamba Osaka	Kawasaki Todoroki Stadium	21,529
33	2017.11.29	Urawa Reds	0-1	Kawasaki Frontale	Saitama Stadium 2002	24,605
34	2017.12.02	Kawasaki Frontale	5-0	Omiya Ardija	Kawasaki Todoroki Stadium	25,904
