= Satoshi Kukino =

Japanese footballer

Personal information
- Full name: Satoshi Kukino
- Date of birth: 16 April 1987 (age 39)
- Place of birth: Miyazaki, Miyazaki, Japan
- Height: 1.73 m (5 ft 8 in)
- Position: Forward

Team information
- Current team: FC Machida Zelvia
- Number: 38

Youth career
- 2003–2005: Nisshō Gakuen High School

Senior career*
Years	Team	Apps	(Gls)
2006–2011	Kawasaki Frontale	27	(2)
2010	→ Yokohama FC (loan)	15	(2)
2012–2014	Tochigi SC	42	(2)
2014	→ FC Machida Zelvia (loan)	14	(2)
2015–	FC Machida Zelvia	35	(6)
Medal record
Kawasaki Frontale
Runner-up	J1 League	2006
Runner-up	J1 League	2008
Runner-up	J1 League	2009
Runner-up	J.League Cup	2007
Runner-up	J.League Cup	2009
- * Club domestic league appearances and goals as of 23 February 2016

Satoshi Kukino (久木野 聡, Kukino Satoshi; born 16 April 1987 in Miyazaki, Miyazaki) is a retired Japanese football player who played for F.C. Machida Zelvia.

== Club career statistics ==
Updated to 23 February 2016.

Appearances and goals by club, season and competition
Club	Season	League			Emperor's Cup		J.League Cup		Asia		Total	
Club	Season	Division	Apps	Goals	Apps	Goals	Apps	Goals	Apps	Goals	Apps	Goals
Kawasaki Frontale	2006	J1 League	0	0	0	0	0	0	—		0	0
Kawasaki Frontale	2007	J1 League	11	1	1	0	5	0	1	0	18	1
Kawasaki Frontale	2008	J1 League	6	1	1	0	3	0	—		10	1
Kawasaki Frontale	2009	J1 League	4	0	1	0	1	0	0	0	6	0
Yokohama FC	2010	J2 League	15	2	1	1	—		—		16	3
Kawasaki Frontale	2011	J1 League	6	0	0	0	1	0	—		7	0
Tochigi SC	2012	J2 League	13	1	1	0	—		—		14	1
Tochigi SC	2013	J2 League	21	1	1	0	—		—		22	1
Tochigi SC	2014	J2 League	8	0	0	0	—		—		8	0
FC Machida Zelvia	2014	J3 League	14	2	—		—		—		14	2
FC Machida Zelvia	2015	J3 League	35	6	4	1	—		—		39	7
Career total			133	14	10	2	10	0	1	0	254	16
