= Eiji Kawashima =

Japanese footballer (born 1983)

Eiji Kawashima 川島 永嗣
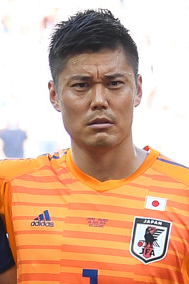
- Kawashima with Japan at the 2018 World Cup

Personal information
- Full name: Eiji Kawashima
- Date of birth: 20 March 1983 (age 43)
- Place of birth: Yono, Saitama, Japan
- Height: 1.85 m (6 ft 1 in)
- Position: Goalkeeper

Team information
- Current team: Júbilo Iwata
- Number: 1

Youth career
- 1995–1997: Yononishi Junior High School
- 1998–2000: Urawa Higashi High School

Senior career*
| Years | Team | Apps | (Gls) |
| 2001–2003 | Omiya Ardija | 45 | (0) |
| 2004–2006 | Nagoya Grampus Eight | 17 | (0) |
| 2007–2010 | Kawasaki Frontale | 114 | (0) |
| 2010–2012 | Lierse | 53 | (0) |
| 2012–2015 | Standard Liège | 68 | (0) |
| 2015–2016 | Dundee United | 16 | (0) |
| 2016–2018 | Metz | 34 | (0) |
| 2018–2023 | Strasbourg | 26 | (0) |
| 2024– | Júbilo Iwata | 70 | (0) |

International career
| 2002–2003 | Japan U20 | 13 | (0) |
| 2008–2022 | Japan | 95 | (0) |
Medal record
Representing Japan
AFC Asian Cup
| Winner | 2011 Qatar |
- * Club domestic league appearances and goals as of 14 August 2026

Eiji Kawashima (川島 永嗣, Kawashima Eiji; born 20 March 1983) is a Japanese professional footballer who plays as a goalkeeper for J2 League club Júbilo Iwata.

Kawashima played in Japan for Omiya Ardija, Nagoya Grampus Eight and Kawasaki Frontale before joining Lierse S.K. in Belgium in 2010. He then played for another Belgian club, Standard Liège, from 2012 to 2015, Dundee United in Scotland from 2015 to 2016; Metz and Strasbourg in France from 2016 to 2023 before returning to Japan with Júbilo Iwata in 2024.

He represented Japan at the 2010, 2014 and 2018 FIFA World Cups, earning over 90 caps, and was also named in the final 26-player squad for the 2022 FIFA World Cup before announcing retirement from international football one month later.

== Early life ==
Born in Yono, Saitama, Japan, Kawashima idolised Sergio Goycochea and Dillem Hais in his youth. He then joined Yononishi Junior High School and Urawa Higashi High School.

Kawashima has an older brother and older sister.

== Club career ==
=== Early career in Japan ===
Kawashima started his professional career at Omiya Ardija in J2 League after graduating Urawa Higashi High School. On 6 April 2002, he made his Omiya Ardija debut. He went on to make 41 appearances for the side during his three-year spell. During his time at Omiya Ardija, Kawashima went on trial at Serie A side Parma.

=== Nagoya Grampus Eight ===
In 2004, Kawashima joined Nagoya Grampus Eight in Japan's J1 League.

He made his debut for the club, starting the whole game, in a 3–1 win against Gamba Osaka in the J. League Cup match on 27 March 2004. Kawashima helped Nagoya Grampus reach the knockout stage of the J. League Cup after the club won four out of the five matches in the group stage. On 12 June 2004, Kawashima finally made his league debut for Nagoya Grampus and kept a clean sheet, in a 3–0 win against Urawa Red Diamonds. However in the quarter–finals of the J. League Cup, Kawashima received a straight red card in the 88th minute, as the club won 2–1 against Kashima Antlers. After serving a one match suspension, he returned as a starting keeper in the semi–finals of the J. League Cup against Urawa Red Diamonds, but Nagoya Grampus were out of the tournament following a 4–1 loss. At the end of the 2004 season, Kawashima made twelve appearances in all competitions.

In the 2005 season, Kawashima stayed as a starter for Nagoya Grampus in the J. League Cup matches. However, he was unable to replicate the success of last season, as the club were eliminated in the J. League Cup group stage. Kawashima only appeared three times in the league. At the end of the 2005 season, he went on to make ten appearances in all competitions.

Due to the absence of Seigo Narazaki, Kawashima became Nagoya Grampus’ first choice goalkeeper at the start of the 2006 season. After the absence of Narazaki, he played two times between 18 July 2006 and 21 July 2006, losing both matches and went on a run of conceding a total of eight goals. However, Kawashima suffered a hand injury while training and was out for four weeks. At the end of the 2006 season, he went on to make fourteen appearances in all competitions.

During his time at Nagoya Grampus, Kawashima competed with veteran goalkeeper Narazaki and served as the club's second choice goalkeeper.

=== Kawasaki Frontale ===
It was announced on 28 December 2006 that Kawasaki Frontale had signed Kawashima for a transfer fee of 150 million yen. The move was, at the time, the largest transfer fee for a player in the J.League.

He made his Kawasaki Frontale’s debut as a starter and kept a clean sheet, in a 1–0 win over Kashima Antlers in the opening game of the season. Five days later on 7 March 2007, Kawashima made AFC Champions League debut, in a 3–1 win over Arema. After establishing himself as the club’s first choice goalkeeper, he soon received praises for his performances. Later in the 2007 season, Kawasaki Frontale became the first Japanese club to qualify for the 2007 AFC Champions League, where they finished first in their group. In the knockout rounds, Kawashima allowed no regulation goals in the quarter finals against Iran's Sepahan club, but Kawasaki Frontale ended up losing 5–4 in the penalty shoot-out. He also helped the club reach the final of J.League Cup against Gamba Osaka but they loss 1–0. At the end of the 2007 season, Kawashima had made 48 appearances (34 in the league) in all competitions.

Ahead of the 2008 season, it was announced that Kawashima would be appointed as Kawasaki Frontale’s vice–captain and stayed to remain as the club’s first choice goalkeeper. He then kept two clean sheets against JEF United Chiba and Consadole Sapporo on 30 March 2008 and 2 April 2008 respectively. Between 26 April 2008 and 6 May 2008, Kawashima helped Kawasaki Frontale win four league matches in a row. He kept a clean sheets against Gamba Osaka, Vissel Kobe and Tokyo Verdy on 23 November 2008, 29 November 2008 and 6 December 2008 respectively. However, the club failed to win the league, finishing as runners-up behind winners Kashima Antlers. At the end of the 2008 season, Kawashima went on to make 36 appearances (34 in the league) in all competitions.

Ahead of the 2009 season, Kawashima remained as Kawasaki Frontale’s vice–captain and stayed on as the club's first choice goalkeeper for the third time in a row. Kawashima then helped Kawasaki Frontale win six league matches in a row between 10 May 2009 and 1 July 2009. Along the way, he kept three consecutive league clean sheets against Oita Trinita, Montedio Yamagata and Gamba Osaka on 20 June 2009, 28 June 2009 and 1 July 2009 respectively. Following this, Kawashima said that he was determined to help the club win the league. At the start of October, Kawashima helped Kawasaki Frontale go on a winning streak against Yokohama F. Marinos, Kashima Antlers, Omiya Ardija, Sanfrecce Hiroshima and JEF United Chiba in the league to keep their fight for the title alive. However, he conceded a goal from Fernandinho that saw the club lose 1–0 against Oita Trinita on 22 November 2009, putting their title run at risk. The loss eventually saw Kawasaki Frontale failed to win the league and finished the season as runners-up despite the club winning the remaining two matches. He was starter in the J.League Cup Final, as Kawasaki Frontale lost 2–0 to FC Tokyo. Despite this, Kawashima was named in the J. League Best Eleven and also won the Individual Fair-Play award for the first time in his career. At the end of the 2009 season, he made a total of 47 appearances (34 in the league) in all competitions.

Ahead of the 2010 season, Kawashima was linked with a move away from Kawasaki Frontale, but he ultimately stayed at the club. Kawashima remained as Kawasaki Frontale’s vice–captain and stayed on as the club's first choice goalkeeper for the fourth time in a row. Prior to an AFC Champions League match against Melbourne Victory on 31 March 2010, he suffered a hand injury in training, but made his recovery and started the whole game, as Kawasaki Frontale lost 1–0. Kawashima made his last appearance for the club, losing 3–1 against Júbilo Iwata on 16 May 2010. By the time he left Kawasaki Frontale, Kawashima went on to make 17 appearances for the side in all competitions.

=== Lierse ===
After participating in the 2010 World Cup, Kawashima completed a move to Europe by joining Lierse S.K. in the Belgian Pro League. Upon joining the club, he signed a two–year contract with an option to extend. Explaining his reason on moving to Europe, Kawashima said, "After I experienced the World Cup, I thought that putting myself in a more competitive environment is the only way I can get better."

Kawashima made his Lierse debut in a 1–0 loss against Sint-Truidense in the opening game of the season. After making his debut for the club, Kawashima quickly became the Lierse’s first choice goalkeeper. However, the club struggled at the start of the season and suffered five defeats in the first five matches, but he impressed the club with saves. On 25 September 2010, Kawashima kept his first clean sheet in a 1–0 win over Charleroi, Lierse’s first league win of the season. In mid–October, Kawashima suffered a groin injury that kept him out throughout the month. He then returned to the starting line-up on 10 November 2010, helping the club beat RFC Tournai 4–1 in the round of 16 of the Belgian Cup. Next, Kawashima went on a run of conceding a total of 24 goals in the league for the rest of 2010, as Lierse suffered heavy defeats, including a 7–0 loss against Standard Liège on 27 November 2010, a 3–1 loss against K.V. Kortrijk on 12 December 2010 and a 6–0 loss against Anderlecht on 26 December 2010. After helping Japan win the Asian Cup, he did not return as a starting goalkeeper until on 12 February 2011 against Germinal Beerschot and helped the club drew 2–2. Following the 2011 Tōhoku earthquake and tsunami, Kawashima made an impressed display for the next two matches against Lokeren and Club Brugge, which saw Lierse secure its status in the league for the next season. In the league's Europa League Playoff’s, he kept another clean sheet, in a 0–0 draw against Cercle Brugge on 2 April 2011. The club finished second place behind Cercle Brugge in the league's Europa League playoffs. At the end of the 2010–11 season, having made 30 appearances in all competitions, Kawashima won the Lierse’s player of the season award.

Ahead of the 2011–12 season, Kawashima was linked a move away from Lierse, with clubs like Fulham, West Bromwich Albion and VVV-Venlo keen on signing him. At the start of the 2011–12 season, Kawashima remained the club’s first choice goalkeeper and then kept his first clean sheet of the season, in a 0–0 draw against Genk on 6 August 2011. He then managed to keep two clean sheets against Cercle Brugge and Westerlo on 17 September 2011 and 24 September 2011 respectively. After the match, manager Chris Janssens praised his performance and contributing to Lierse’s defence, conceding six goals by the end of September. Kawashima was handed the captaincy taking over from Wesley Sonck and captained Lierse for the first time, in a 2–1 win against Zulte Waregem on 15 October 2011. From that moment on, he remained as the club’s captain for the rest of the 2011–12 season. Kawashima, once again, kept two clean sheets against Anderlecht and OH Leuven on 26 February 2012 and 3 March 2012 respectively. His performance at Lierse led the club begin negotiations over a new contract. At the end of the 2011–12 season, he had played all 30 regular league games and six Europa League Playoff games. For his performance, Kawashima won Lierse’s player of the season award. For his performances, he was nominated for Goalkeeper of the Year but lost out to Silvio Proto.

==== 2011 fan incident ====
On 19 August 2011, during a league match between Lierse and Germinal Beerschot, which Lierse were leading 1–0, Kawashima was subjected to taunts and insults by Beerschot supporters, who chanted "Kawashima, Fukushima!" in reference to the Fukushima Daiichi nuclear disaster. After being confronted by Kawashima, the referee halted the match for several minutes until order was restored. After the match had ended in a 1–1 draw, Kawashima left in tears, visibly upset at the insults. Kawashima said, "I can pass on many things, but not that. This is not funny. Using the drama of Fukushima in this manner is not at all funny."

After the match, Beerschot released a statement on the incident: "Our fans have crossed a thin line where a bit of fun turns into something serious. The chants aimed at Lierse goalkeeper Kawashima were offensive and completely out of order". However, Beerschot said that Kawashima was partly to blame: "The Lierse shot-stopper also took part in this as he provoked the Beerschot fans with offensive gestures and facial expressions. Our own goalkeeper Stijn Stijnen on the other hand never reacted to abusive chants and insults from the Lierse faithful." Beerschot further emphasized that it was completely unacceptable to assert insults of this nature.

The club's statement enraged Lierse, who took the matter to the Royal Belgian Football Association (RBFA) and soon after, Beerschot posted an apology to the Japanese on their website. The RBFA fined Beerschot 30,000 Swiss francs (¥2.7 million and US$34,920) and RBFA officials apologized not only to Kawashima, but also to Jun Yokota, the Japanese ambassador to Belgium, over the incident. However, Beerschot announced their intention to appeal against their decision, based on the amount of fine they received as well as their financial problems. In the end, the Appeals Committee of the KBVB reduced the fines to €16,400 instead. However, the club were still unsatisfied with the fines and in February 2012, the Appeals Committee of the KBVB reduced the fines to €2,480 plus the legal costs.

On 22 September 2011, Beerschot formally apologized to Kawashima. Responding to Beerschot's apology, he said: "I myself have no family in the region, but I have been there visiting. People still suffer from the situation. For me, these excuses are sufficient. I also do not think supporters should be allowed to call anything anymore. They must be able to create atmosphere, but there are limits."

A year later in October 2012, French television host Laurent Ruquier made a joke about the 'Fukushima effect' and Kawashima after he showed a picture in live audience of composite picture about Kawashima with four arms. This caused outrage from Japan, who criticised Ruquier for "lacking consideration." The next day, Ruquier apologised for the joke.

When Beerschot and Lierse met again on 26 December 2011, Kawashima started the whole game, as they drew 0–0. During the match, Beerschot's supporters asked him for forgiveness.

=== Standard Liège ===
On 18 July 2012, Kawashima left Lierse to join Standard Liège on a three-year deal. The move reportedly cost the club €600,000.

In the opening game of the season, he made his debut for Standard Liège, losing 1–0 against Zulte Waregem. In a follow–up match against his former club Lierse, Kawashima kept a clean sheet, in a 0–0 draw and throughout the match, he received standing ovations from Lierse supporters. Since joining the club, Kawashima quickly established himself in the first team as Standard Liège’s first choice goalkeeper. He then kept two clean sheets against Genk and OH Leuven, in two 2–0 victories on 31 October 2012 and 4 November 2012 respectively. Kawashima, once again, kept three consecutive clean sheets in the league against Zulte Waregem, Lierse and Waasland-Beveren on 18 November 2012, 23 November 2012 and 2 December 2012 respectively. For the second time in the 2012–13 season, he kept another three consecutive clean sheets in the league against Cercle Brugge, Genk and OH Leuven on 16 February 2013, 24 February 2013 and 9 March 2013 respectively. As the 2012–13 season progressed, the club became a serious contender for the title in the Championship Playoff. However, Standard Liege's two losses between 5 May 2013 and 12 May 2013 against Anderlecht and Club Brugge cost the club as title contender. Kawashima started in every match throughout the 2012–13 season until he was dropped from the squad for the next two matches following his poor performance against Club Brugge. Kawashima played in both legs, in a 7–1 win against Gent to earn Standard Liege the Europa League spot. In his first season at the club, he made 40 appearances in all competitions. For his performances, Kawashima was nominated for Goalkeeper of the Year but lost out to Silvio Proto for the second time.

Ahead of the 2013–14 season, Kawashima was linked with a move away from Standard Liege, but no bid was made. Instead, he remained as the club’s first choice goalkeeper at the start of the season. Throughout the UEFA Europa League qualifications playoffs campaign, Kawashima helped Standard Liege reach the group stage after beating KR, Xanthi and FC Minsk. He started the league season well by keeping six clean sheets in the first six league matches. Kawashima later credited the arrival of goalkeeper coach Jos Beckx for his performances. However, in late–October, he suffered a hip injury which made him miss three matches. Two weeks later on 10 November 2013, Kawashima returned from injury against Club Brugge and kept a clean sheet in a 0–0 draw, This was followed up three more clean sheets in the next three league matches. He then kept five more clean sheets between 18 January 2014 and 15 February 2014. As the 2013–14 season progressed, the club became a title contender again, but three draws and losses saw Standard Liege cost their chance as title contender once again. At the end of the 2013–14 season, Kawashima had made 47 appearances in all competitions. For his performances, he was nominated for Goalkeeper of the Year for the third time, but lost out to Mathew Ryan.

In the 2014–15 season, Kawashima helped Standard Liege beat Panathinaikos 2–1 on aggregate in the second qualification round for the UEFA Champions League. The club were eventually eliminated in the playoff rounds after losing 4–0 on aggragate against Zenit Saint Petersburg. In the opening game of the 2014–15 season, he made a perfect start by keeping a clean sheet in a 3–0 win over Charleroi. In a follow–up match against K.V. Kortrijk, Kawashima produced an impressive saves, described as "world class" by Het Nieuwsblad, as Standard Liege won 3–2. However, he was subject of criticism over his performances after mistakes against Feyenoord, Club Brugge and Zulte Waregem. As a result of his poor performances, Kawashima lost his first choice goalkeeper role to Yohann Thuram-Ulien and was demoted to the substitute bench. Despite this, he appeared two matches in cup competitions in December against Lokeren and Feyenoord, losing both matches. Despite losing his first choice goalkeeper role for the rest of the season, Kawashima finished with 19 appearances in all competitions.

At the end of the 2014–15 season, he subsequently left the club when his contract expired to pursue more first team football after losing his place to Thuram-Ulien.

=== Dundee United ===
Scottish Premiership club Dundee United applied for a UK work permit to sign Kawashima in November 2015. The signing was confirmed on 29 December, after the work permit had been approved. Upon joining the club, he was described as a "fantastic coup" by Manager Mixu Paatelainen.

Kawashima made his debut for the club against city rivals Dundee on 2 January 2016, losing 2–1. However, his performance received criticism when he was at fault for conceding soft goals. Nevertheless, Kawashima managed to keep three clean sheets against Hamilton Academical, Ross County and St. Johnstone. However, Dundee United were relegated after again losing 2–1 to Dundee on 2 May 2016.

At the end of the 2015–16 season, following the club's relegation, he was released having made 16 appearances in all competitions.

=== Metz ===
On 2 August 2016, Kawashima signed for Ligue 1 side Metz.

Kawashima started the season outside the starting lineup for the first two months, appearing on the substitute bench and serving as backup to Thomas Didillon for most of the season. On 8 January 2017 when he played the full 90 minutes against RC Lens in the first round of the Coupe de France, as the club exited the competition. Kawashima made his league debut for FC Metz in a 3–2 loss against Paris Saint-Germain on 18 April 2017. His fourth appearance for the club against Toulouse on 15 May 2017 saw him play a vital role with his impressive saves, including saving a penalty, in a 1–1 draw. At the end of the 2016–17 season, he had played five league games during his maiden season in France.

Ahead of the 2017–18 season, Kawashima announced his intention to stay at FC Metz for another season. He started the 2017–18 season on the bench, with Didillon preferred as the club’s first choice goalkeeper. However, following FC Metz’s first three defeats, Kawashima played his first match of the season against SM Caen on 26 August 2017 and despite some impressive saves, the club eventually loss 1–0. He was then sent off in the 50th minute for a professional foul on Adama Diakhaby in a 3–1 loss against AS Monaco on 21 January 2018. After serving a one match suspension, Kawashima returned to the starting lineup in a 2–1 win over OGC Nice on 27 January 2018. Over the next two months, his performance earned him the FC Metz’s Player of the Month award for February and March. Kawashima reassured his team with a series of excellent displays and as a result, he cemented himself as the club's number one as they fought relegation. His form for Metz earned him a recall to the Japan national team, where he went on to reclaim the number one jersey. Despite missing out due to injury and appearing as an unused substitute in a number of matches during the 2017–18 season, Kawashima made a total of 31 appearances in all competitions.

At the end of the 2017–18 season, upon expiry of his contract, he was released by the club.

=== Strasbourg ===
On 29 August 2018, free agent Kawashima joined Ligue 1 side RC Strasbourg on a season-long contract.

However, he found himself as the club’s third choice goalkeeper behind Bingourou Kamara and Matz Sels. Because of this, Kawashima began playing for RC Strasbourg’s reserve team throughout the 2018–19 season. Following the club winning the Coupe de la Ligue final, he expressed mixed opinion of the achievement, due to not playing in the match. On the last game of the season, Kawashima made his only appearance of the 2018–19 season against FC Nantes and kept a clean sheet, in a 1–0 win.

Ahead of the 2019–20 season, Kawashima was linked a move away from RC Strasbourg, as he was linked a move back to Japan, with Vissel Kobe interested in signing him. But Kawashima opted to stay at the club by signing a two–year contract extension. Throughout the 2019–20 season, he remained RC Strasbourg’s third choice goalkeeper behind Kamara and Sels and continued to play for the club’s reserve. Kawashima made no appearance for RC Strasbourg throughout the 2019–20 season, as the season was suspended indefinitely on 12 March due to the COVID-19 pandemic.

Kawashima became RC Strasbourg’s first choice goalkeeper in the first two matches of the 2020–21 season following the injury of Sels and competed with Kamara over the role. After losing both matches, he was demoted to the substitution bench and was replaced by Kamara, but regained his first choice goalkeeper role for the club by late–November. Kawashima helped RC Strasbourg three consecutive clean sheets between 6 January 2021 and 17 January 2021. During his run as the club’s first choice goalkeeper role, he was named RC Strasbourg’s Man of the Match three times. By April, Kawashima returned to the substitute bench following the return of Sels. But he regained his first choice goalkeeper role for the club in the last two matches of the 2020–21 season and helped RC Strasbourg finish fifteenth place. At the end of the 2020–21 season, Kawashima made twenty–four appearances in all competitions. On 12 June 2021, he signed a contract extension with RC Strasbourg, keeping him until 2023.

Kawashima spent the next two seasons at RC Strasbourg as the club’s second choice goalkeeper behind the returning Sels and was featured on the substitute bench. He appeared twice for RC Strasbourg during the 2021–22 season. However, Kawashima then faced his own injury concerns after injuring his shoulder throughout the 2022–23 season.

At the end of the 2022–23 season, he was released by the club upon expiry of his contract. Even after leaving the club, Kawashima trained with RC Strasbourg and FC Hipsheim for the rest of the year to maintain his fitness in hopes of finding a new club.

=== Júbilo Iwata ===
After a decade playing in Europe, Kawashima returned to Japan for the first time in 13 years, where he signed for newly promoted J1 League side Júbilo Iwata on 12 January 2024. Upon joining the club, Kawashima was given a number one shirt.

He made his Júbilo Iwata debut as the fifth oldest player to play in a J1 League at 40 years, 11 months and 4 days and the oldest goalkeeper to do so, breaking the record of Dido Havenaar, as the club loss 2–0 against Vissel Kobe in the opening game of the season. Kawashima played against his former club Kawasaki Frontale and performed in a 5–4 thriller win for Júbilo Iwata in a follow–up match. Since joining the club, he became a first choice goalkeeper for Júbilo Iwata. However, Kawashima came under criticism when he conceded ten goals in the first five league matches of the season. This led to him improving his performance when Kawashima kept two consecutive clean sheets between 3 April 2024 and 7 April 2024 against Albirex Niigata and Kyoto Sanga. In a match against Machida Zelvia on 27 April 2024, he was named a man of the match and kept a clean sheet, including saving a late minute shot from Mitch Duke, as the club won 2–0. However, Kawashima was dropped for three matches between 11 May 2024 and 15 May 2024. But he made his return to the starting line–up against Urawa Red Diamonds on 19 May 2024. However during a 2–2 draw against Kawasaki Frontale on 6 July 2024, Kawashima suffered a foot injury and was substituted in the 54th minute. After missing five matches, he returned to the starting line–up, in a 4–0 loss against Machida Zelvia on 17 August 2024. Following this, Kawashima regained his place as Júbilo Iwata’s first choice goalkeeper for the rest of the 2024 season. Despite his return, the club was relegated to J2 League after losing 3–0 against Sagan Tosu on the last game of the season. At the end of the 2024 season, he made thirty–two appearances in all competitions.

Ahead of the 2025 season, Júbilo Iwata announced that Kawashima signed a one–year contract extension with the club. He was appointed as the new captain by Júbilo Iwata. Kawashima started in the first four league matches of the season. However, he made errors in the next two matches against V-Varen Nagasaki and Kataller Toyama that saw the club lose both matches. This caused Kawashima to lose his first choice goalkeeper status and was demoted to the substitute bench, as he began to compete with Ryuki Miura and Koto Abe over the starting position. In a match against Iwaki FC on 17 May 2025, Kawashima came on as a 25th-minute substitute after Ryuki Miura came off with an injury and played the rest of the match, as Júbilo Iwata won 2–0. Following this, he became the club’s first choice goalkeeper for three months. However, Kawashima made errors in the next two matches against Blaublitz Akita and Iwaki FC that saw Júbilo Iwata lose both matches. This caused Kawashima to lose his first choice goalkeeper status and did not play for six matches. On 4 October 2025, he returned to the starting line–up and kept a clean sheet, in a 1–0 win against Ventforet Kofu. Kawashima regained his first choice goalkeeper status for the rest of the season, as the club failed to return to J1 League. At the end of the 2025 season, he went on to make twenty–four appearances in all competitions.

Ahead of the 2026 season, Júbilo Iwata announced that Kawashima signed a one–year contract extension with the club.

== International career ==
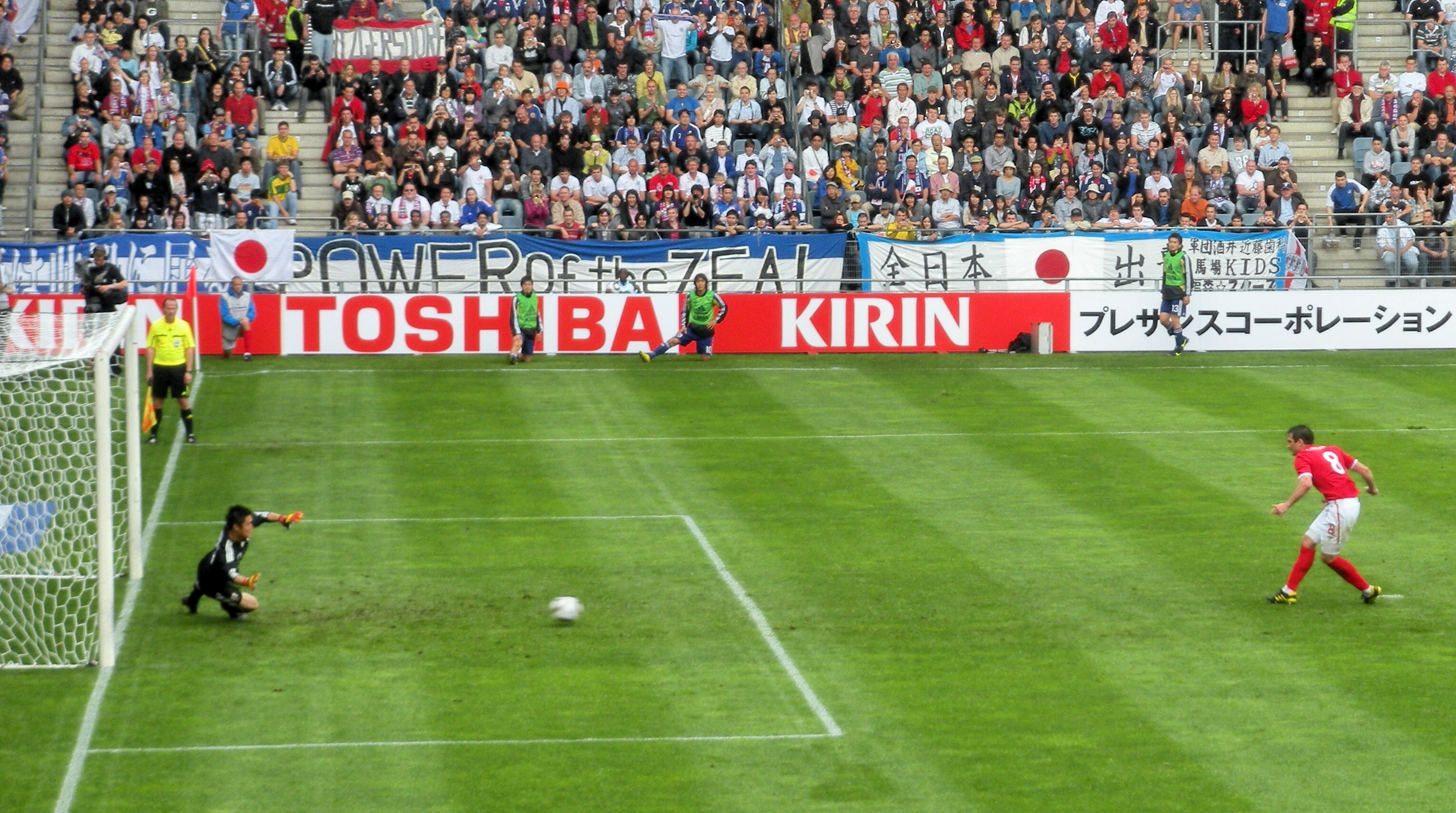
Kawashima saving a penalty from Frank Lampard in the international friendly between Japan and England in Graz, Austria on 30 May 2010.

Kawashima represented the Japan U20 side impressing in the AFC Youth Championship and being named Goalkeeper of the Tournament despite losing 1–0 to South Korea U20 in the final.

Kawashima was called up to the senior team for the first time by manager Ivica Osim on 19 March 2007. Five days later on 24 March 2007, he was included in the 18-man squad for the match against Peru but appeared as an unused substitute. Kawashima initially appeared as an unused substitute, including at the Asian Cup. On 17 February 2008, he made his Japan senior debut in a 1–1 draw against North Korea. He made another appearance for the Samurai Blue on 20 January 2009, in a 2–1 win over Yemen. By the end of 2009, Kawashima kept four clean sheets in three victories and one draw.

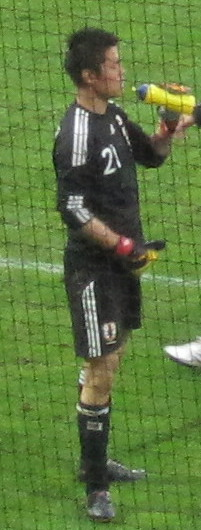
Kawashima playing in goal in the international friendly between Japan and England in Graz (Austria) on 30 May 2010.

In May 2010, Kawashima was selected for the FIFA World Cup’s squad and was expected to serve as backup to Seigo Narazaki. In a friendly match on 30 May against England, he was the starting goalkeeper and produced many saves, denying Frank Lampard’s shot twice, including a penalty kick, and Wayne Rooney’s shot before eventually being beaten by two own goals. Afterwards, it was announced that Kawashima was selected to be the first choice goalkeeper for the FIFA World Cup ahead of Narazaki. He played his first Group E match against Cameroon on 14 June 2010, where Japan recorded its first World Cup win on foreign soil with a score of 1–0. Five days later, on 19 June 2010 between against the Netherlands, Kawashima was the starter; he deflected a shot from Wesley Sneijder but it went in his own net as the Samurai Blue loss 0–1. In the match against Denmark on 24 June 2010, Kawashima allowed one goal through Jon Dahl Tomasson's penalty kick, but Japan still won 3–1 and advanced to the round of 16. On 29 June 2010, Kawashima allowed no goals against Paraguay but was unable to save a single spot-kick during the penalty shoot-out, which Paraguay won 5–3.

After the FIFA World Cup came to an end, Kawashima played two matches against Paraguay and Argentina. In December 2010, it was announced that he was selected by the Samurai Blue for the 2011 Asian Cup. Kawashima played his first match of the tournament starting in a 1–1 draw against Jordan on 9 January 2011. On 13 January 2011, however, he was sent off for causing a penalty in the group stage match against Syria, but Japan went on to win the game 2–1. After serving a one-match suspension, Kawashima returned to the Samurai Blue’ squad in a 3–2 win over Qatar in the quarter–final. In the semi-final against South Korea on 26 January 2011, he saved two penalty shoot-out shots to enable Japan to advance. On 29 January 2011, Kawashima kept a clean sheet in the Final as Japan won 1–0; he was chosen as Man of the Match. After the match Kawashima spoke about winning the Asian Cup.

Following the Asian Cup tournament, Kawashima kept four consecutive clean sheets in a row against Peru, Czech Republic, South Korea and North Korea. He kept two more clean sheets against Tajikistan in both matches, both of which were victories. Between 23 May 2012 and 8 June 2012, Kawashima kept three clean sheets in a row against Azerbaijan, Oman and Jordan. Later in the year, he kept more three clean sheets in a row for the second time this year against UAE, Iraq and France.

In May 2013, Kawashima was called up by the Samurai Blue for the 2013 Confederations Cup squad. He appeared three times in the tournament, including winning his 48th cap for his country against Mexico on 22 June 2013, as Japan were eliminated from the tournament. Despite the defeat, Kawashima's performance was praised by Brazilian sports newspaper "Reims".

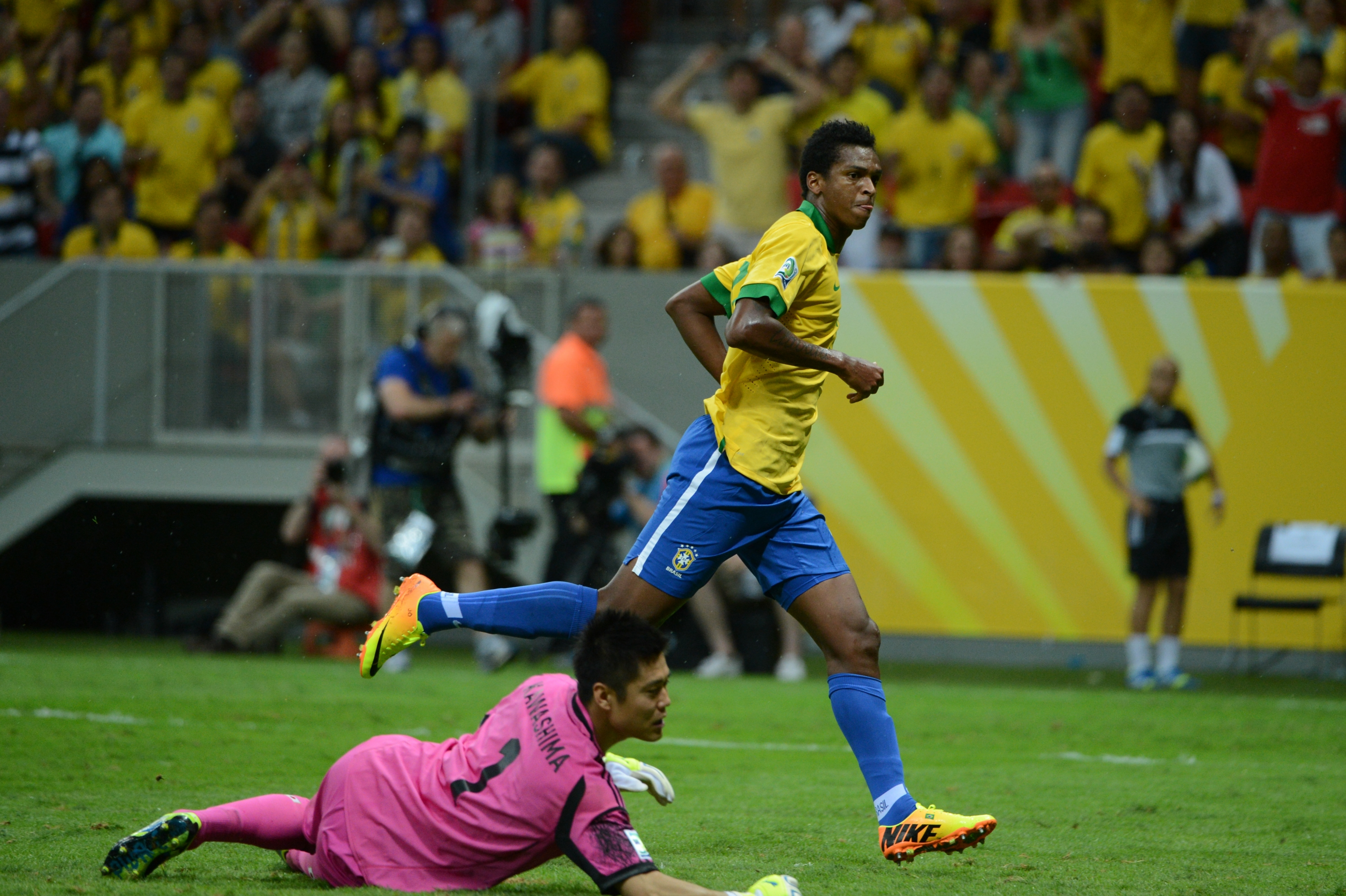
Kawashima conceding a goal against Brazil at the 2013 FIFA Confederations Cup.

In May 2014, Kawashima was named in Japan's preliminary squad for the 2014 World Cup in Brazil. In the end, he made it to the final cut for the 23 man squad. Kawashima started all three matches for the Samurai Blue, but Japan was eliminated from the tournament in the group stage. He kept a clean sheet in a 0–0 draw against Greece on 20 June 2014. After the match, Kawashima reflected about his time at the World Cup in Brazil, later stating that his performance against Colombia haunted him. On 14 October 2014, he captained Samurai Blue for the first time, in a 4–0 loss against Brazil.

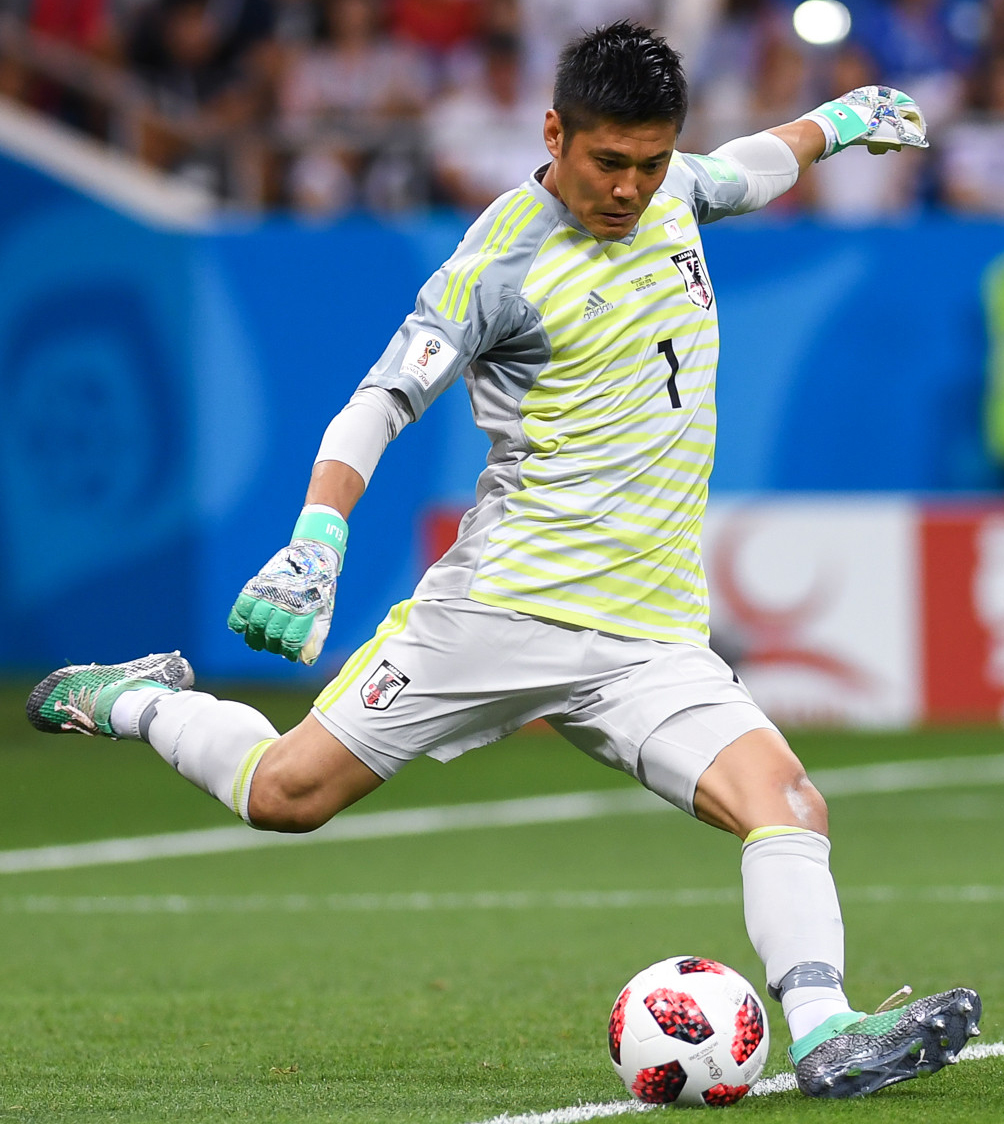
Kawashima about to take a goal kick during the match against Belgium in the round of 16 of the 2018 FIFA World Cup in Russia.

In December 2014, Kawashima was named in Japan's squad for the Asian Cup in Australia. He started the tournament well, keeping three clean sheets in the group stage matches that saw the Samurai Blue through to the quarter–finals. However, in a match against UAE on 23 January 2015, Kawashima conceded a goal from Ali Mabkhout before Japan equalised and the match was played throughout 120 minutes; ultimately, the Samurai Blue were eliminated after losing in penalty–shootout. Later in June, he kept two clean sheets in a row on 11 and 16 June 2015 against Iraq and Singapore.

However, after leaving Standard Liège, Kawashima was called up to Japan’s squad and lost his place to Shusaku Nishikawa and Masaaki Higashiguchi. He made his first appearance for the Samurai Blue in twelve months on 3 June 2016, in a 7–2 win over Bulgaria. Following this, Kawashima spent the rest of 2016 on the substitute bench, as Nishikawa was preferred as the starting goalkeeper instead. On his return as a starting goalkeeper against UAE, he kept the two clean sheets in the process in the World Cup qualification Asia.

In May 2018, Kawashima was named in Japan's preliminary squad for the World Cup in Russia. Eventually, he made it to the final cut of the 23 men squad. After being selected for the World Cup, Kawashima started as the first choice goalkeeper for the Samurai Blue and helped Japan beat Colombia 2–1 on the first match of the group stage. His performance against Colombia earned him the lowest rating by Web Gekisaka. In a 2–2 draw against Senegal, Kawashima was at fault when he attempted to clear the ball, only for Sadio Mané to score. Despite the criticism, Manager Akira Nishino gave confidence in Kawashima and gave him the captaincy against Poland. Throughout the match, Kawashima captained Japan, making many saves, though he conceded a goal from Jan Bednarek, which saw the Samurai Blue lose 1–0. Due to receiving fewer yellow cards than Senegal Japan qualified to the knockout stage, becoming the only Asian team to do so in the 2018 World Cup. In the Round of 16 against Belgium, Japan were eliminated from the tournament after losing 3–2 despite Kawashima's fine performance. While receiving criticism for his performance, Kawashima was placed third place for having the highest number of saves in the World Cup, according to Opta Sports.

Following the FIFA World Cup. Kawashima didn’t receive another call–up until on 24 May 2019 when he made it to the final cut of the 23 men Copa América's squad. Manager Hajime Moriyasu explained his decision to call up Kawashima, citing his experience to the team. In response to his call–up, he said: "The situation in the team was tough, and I didn't think I was in a position to be called up". After being placed on the substitute against Chile, Kawashima replaced Keisuke Osako as a starter and helped Japan drew 2–2 draw against Uruguay. After the match, he said about his appearance in over a year: "Personally, I'm always preparing. I'm doing my best to show high-quality performance, regardless of whether I play in the game or not. Since the coach used me, I had to support the young team from behind." Kawashima made another appearance for the Samurai Blue against Ecuador but Japan was eventually eliminated from the group stage after a 1–1 draw. He made one more appearance for the Samurai Blue by the end of 2019, losing 4–1 against Venezuela on 19 November 2019.

Kawashima spent two years on the substitute bench for Japan without playing, due to facing competition against Daniel Schmidt and Shūichi Gonda. On 28 May 2021, he made his first appearance for the Samurai Blue in two years against Myanmar and kept a clean sheet, in a 10–0. Three weeks later on 15 June 2021, Kawashima made another Japan’s appearance, helping Samurai Blue beat Kyrgyzstan. Following Japan’s qualification to the World Cup, he played the last game of the qualification stage against Vietnam and draw 1–1. Three months later on 10 June 2022, Kawashima made another appearance for the Samurai Blue, in what turns out to be last appearance for Japan, against Ghana, winning 4–1. On 1 November 2022, he was included as part of the Samurai Blue’s 26 man squad for the FIFA World Cup in Qatar. Kawashima reiterated that he aimed to make it to the World Cup squad. Upon being called up to the squad, Kawashima hold Japan’s tying record of appearing four times in the World Cup. However, manager Hajime Moriyasu announced that he would be picking Shūichi Gonda as Japan’s first choice goalkeeper ahead of Kawashima. He appeared four times as an unused substitute bench, as Samurai Blue reached the last-16 of the World Cup, losing against Croatia. Following this, Kawashima announced his retirement from the Japan’s national team on 15 December 2022.

== Style of play ==
At Lierse, Kawashima received praise from the club. CEO Neil De Kewler said of him: "The movement within the goal is quick, the processing of the ball on the line is skillful, furthermore, the player with the leadership that can lead the defense line", while technical director Root Kelzer said: "I can not think of any bad points about him, I will not have anyone who dislikes him, He is a very professional athlete, seriously and disciplinedly open for everyone, every time he looks up, he asks for a handshake with a friendly smile, not only as a player but also as an individual."

Prior to signing for Dundee United, Manager Mixu Paatelainen said about him: "As for Eiji, he is quality. He is very agile and quick. He commands and is a leader behind the defence. He talks a lot and sometime demands better action from the defenders." Kawashima reflected on his time in Europe, learning to adapt the playing style and training in contrast to his home country.

== Personal life ==
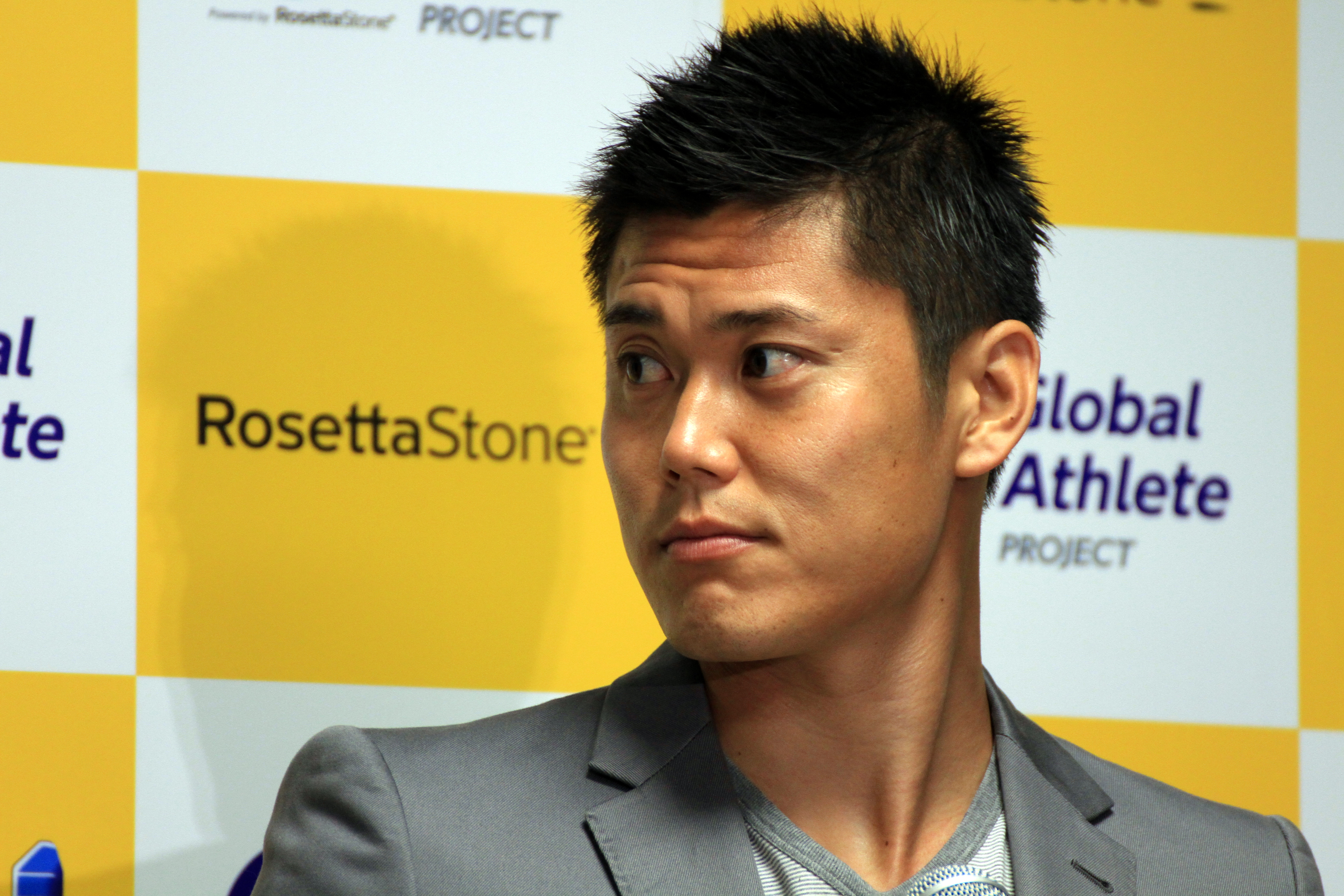
Eiji Kawashima at a presentation for product launch in 2011.

As a member of Japan's national team, Kawashima helped develop a program to improve the foreign language skills of Japanese athletes and coaches who play and coach internationally. Outside of football, he was also involved in helping children with disabilities. In his early football career at Nagoya Grampus Eight, Kawashima voluntary took up as a police chief in effort to tackle crime prevention in Japan.

In addition to his native Japanese, Kawashima speaks English, Dutch, French, Italian, Portuguese and Spanish. He was quoted saying about the importance of languages: "It is difficult if the keeper cannot speak, I cannot argue with myself." Kawashima revealed that he wears contact lenses on the pitch.

In December 2008, Kawashima signed for an agency with Tetsuro Kiyooka, a FIFA Players' Agent (Sports agent), in hopes of moving to Europe. This proved to have worked when he joined Lierse two years later via FIFA-agent Stefan Van Heester. In September 2014, Kawashima revealed on his blog that he was married to a general woman, who is half-Japanese and half- Colombian. Kawashima said he met his wife four years ago and began dating three years later before getting married. In December 2015, Kawashima revealed on his blog that he was father for the first time when his wife gave birth to a son named Kensei. Kawashima also became a father of two daughters.

In October 2010, Kawashima signed a sponsorship with Samantha Thavasa. He was featured in June 2012 cover of Ermenegildo Zegna magazine. Because of the sponsorship and featured in a cover, Kawashima is a fan of fashion. Outside of football, he is considered to be very popular in his native country Japan. During a 1–1 draw against Genk on 18 December 2010, at least 500 Japanese Kawashima's supporters visited Herman Vanderpoortenstadion to watch him play. In May 2018, he published his first book titled "Peace of Mind: There is a way to control pressure".

While playing for RC Strasbourg, Kawashima tested positive for COVID-19 amid the pandemic in France on two occasions between 2020 and 2022.

== Career statistics ==
=== Club ===
As of match played 8 December 2024

Appearances and goals by club, season and competition
| Club | Season | League | | | National cup (Note: Includes Emperor's Cup, Belgian Cup, Scottish Cup) | | League cup (Note: Includes J. League Cup) | | Continental (Note: Includes AFC Champions League, UEFA Champions League, UEFA Europa League) | | Other (Note: Includes Belgian Pro League play-offs) | | Total | |
| Club | Season | Division | Apps | Goals | Apps | Goals | Apps | Goals | Apps | Goals | Apps | Goals | Apps | Goals |
|---|---|---|---|---|---|---|---|---|---|---|---|---|---|---|
| Omiya Ardija | 2001 | J2 League | 0 | 0 | 0 | 0 | 0 | 0 | — | | — | | 0 | 0 |
| Omiya Ardija | 2002 | J2 League | 8 | 0 | 4 | 0 | — | | — | | — | | 12 | 0 |
| Omiya Ardija | 2003 | J2 League | 33 | 0 | 0 | 0 | — | | — | | — | | 33 | 0 |
| Omiya Ardija | Total | | 41 | 0 | 4 | 0 | 0 | 0 | — | | — | | 45 | 0 |
| Nagoya Grampus Eight | 2004 | J1 League | 4 | 0 | 0 | 0 | 8 | 0 | — | | — | | 12 | 0 |
| Nagoya Grampus Eight | 2005 | J1 League | 3 | 0 | 1 | 0 | 6 | 0 | — | | — | | 10 | 0 |
| Nagoya Grampus Eight | 2006 | J1 League | 10 | 0 | 0 | 0 | 4 | 0 | — | | — | | 14 | 0 |
| Nagoya Grampus Eight | Total | | 17 | 0 | 1 | 0 | 18 | 0 | — | | — | | 36 | 0 |
| Kawasaki Frontale | 2007 | J1 League | 34 | 0 | 4 | 0 | 3 | 0 | 7 | 0 | — | | 48 | 0 |
| Kawasaki Frontale | 2008 | J1 League | 34 | 0 | 1 | 0 | 1 | 0 | — | | — | | 36 | 0 |
| Kawasaki Frontale | 2009 | J1 League | 34 | 0 | 1 | 0 | 3 | 0 | 9 | 0 | — | | 47 | 0 |
| Kawasaki Frontale | 2010 | J1 League | 11 | 0 | — | | — | | 6 | 0 | — | | 17 | 0 |
| Kawasaki Frontale | Total | | 113 | 0 | 6 | 0 | 7 | 0 | 22 | 0 | — | | 148 | 0 |
| Lierse | 2010–11 | Belgian Pro League | 23 | 0 | 2 | 0 | — | | — | | 5 | 0 | 30 | 0 |
| Lierse | 2011–12 | Belgian Pro League | 30 | 0 | 6 | 0 | — | | — | | 6 | 0 | 42 | 0 |
| Lierse | Total | | 53 | 0 | 8 | 0 | — | | — | | 11 | 0 | 72 | 0 |
| Standard Liège | 2012–13 | Belgian Pro League | 30 | 0 | 0 | 0 | — | | — | | 10 | 0 | 40 | 0 |
| Standard Liège | 2013–14 | Belgian Pro League | 27 | 0 | 1 | 0 | — | | 9 | 0 | 10 | 0 | 47 | 0 |
| Standard Liège | 2014–15 | Belgian Pro League | 11 | 0 | 1 | 0 | — | | 7 | 0 | — | | 19 | 0 |
| Standard Liège | Total | | 68 | 0 | 2 | 0 | — | | 16 | 0 | 20 | 0 | 106 | 0 |
| Dundee United | 2015–16 | Scottish Premiership | 16 | 0 | 3 | 0 | 0 | 0 | — | | — | | 19 | 0 |
| Metz | 2016–17 | Ligue 1 | 5 | 0 | 1 | 0 | 0 | 0 | — | | — | | 6 | 0 |
| Metz | 2017–18 | Ligue 1 | 29 | 0 | 1 | 0 | 0 | 0 | — | | — | | 30 | 0 |
| Metz | Total | | 34 | 0 | 2 | 0 | 0 | 0 | — | | — | | 36 | 0 |
| Strasbourg | 2018–19 | Ligue 1 | 1 | 0 | 0 | 0 | 0 | 0 | — | | — | | 1 | 0 |
| Strasbourg | 2019–20 | Ligue 1 | 0 | 0 | 0 | 0 | 0 | 0 | — | | — | | 0 | 0 |
| Strasbourg | 2020–21 | Ligue 1 | 24 | 0 | 0 | 0 | — | | — | | — | | 24 | 0 |
| Strasbourg | 2021–22 | Ligue 1 | 1 | 0 | 1 | 0 | — | | — | | — | | 2 | 0 |
| Strasbourg | 2022–23 | Ligue 1 | 0 | 0 | 0 | 0 | — | | — | | — | | 0 | 0 |
| Strasbourg | Total | | 26 | 0 | 1 | 0 | 0 | 0 | — | | — | | 27 | 0 |
| Strasbourg II | 2022–23 | CFA 3 | 1 | 0 | — | | — | | — | | — | | 1 | 0 |
| Júbilo Iwata | 2024 | J1 League | 32 | 0 | 0 | 0 | 0 | 0 | — | | — | | 32 | 0 |
| Career total | | | 401 | 0 | 27 | 0 | 25 | 0 | 38 | 0 | 31 | 0 | 522 | 0 |

=== International ===
Appearances and goals by national team and year
| National team | Year | Apps | Goals |
|---|---|---|---|
| Japan | 2008 | 1 | 0 |
| Japan | 2009 | 7 | 0 |
| Japan | 2010 | 8 | 0 |
| Japan | 2011 | 12 | 0 |
| Japan | 2012 | 11 | 0 |
| Japan | 2013 | 14 | 0 |
| Japan | 2014 | 11 | 0 |
| Japan | 2015 | 7 | 0 |
| Japan | 2016 | 1 | 0 |
| Japan | 2017 | 9 | 0 |
| Japan | 2018 | 7 | 0 |
| Japan | 2019 | 3 | 0 |
| Japan | 2021 | 2 | 0 |
| Japan | 2022 | 2 | 0 |
| Total | | 95 | 0 |

== Honours ==
Strasbourg

- Coupe de la Ligue: 2018-19

Japan

- AFC Asian Cup: 2011

Individual

- J.League Best Eleven: 2009
- J.League Individual Fair-Play Award: 2009
