= 2011 Kawasaki Frontale season =

Kawasaki Frontale
2011 season
- Manager: Naoki Soma
- J. League Division 1: 11th
- Emperor's Cup: Fourth round
- J. League Cup: Second round
Home colours	Away colours

The 2011 Kawasaki Frontale season was Kawasaki Frontale's seventh consecutive season in J. League Division 1 and 10th season overall in the Japanese top flight. It also includes the 2011 J. League Cup, and the 2011 Emperor's Cup.

== Competitions ==
=== J. League ===
==== League table ====
Pos	Team	Pld	W	D	L	GF	GA	GD	Pts
9	Vissel Kobe	34	13	7	14	44	45	−1	46
10	Shimizu S-Pulse	34	11	12	11	42	51	−9	45
11	Kawasaki Frontale	34	13	5	16	52	53	−1	44
12	Cerezo Osaka	34	11	10	13	67	53	+14	43
13	Omiya Ardija	34	10	12	12	38	48	−10	42

Updated to match(es) played on December 3, 2011. Source: J.League Division 1
Rules for classification: 1st points; 2nd goal differential; 3rd goals scored; 4th head-to-head results; 5th disciplinary points; 6th draw. If two clubs are tied for first place, both clubs will be declared.

==== Results summary ====
5 March 2011 Round 1	Kawasaki Frontale	2 - 0	Montedio Yamagata	Kawasaki Todoroki Stadium
Saturday 15:04	Yajima 34', Noborizato 38'	Report		Attendance: 18,673; Referee: Yamamoto

13 March 2011 Round 2	Yokohama F. Marinos	v	Kawasaki Frontale
Sunday 15:00

==== Results by round ====
Round	1	2	3	4	5	6	7	8	9	10	11	12	13	14	15	16	17	18	19	20	21	22	23	24	25	26	27	28	29	30	31	32	33	34
Ground	H																																	
Result	W																																	
Position	3																																	

Updated to match(es) played on 6 March 2011. Source: "World-Football.net".
A = Away; H = Home; W = Win; D = Draw; L = Loss

=== Emperor's Cup ===
2011-10-08 Second round	Kawasaki Frontale	2 – 1 (a.e.t.)	Arte Takasaki	Todoroki Athletics Stadium, Kawasaki
15:00	Kobayashi 61'; Tasaka 105'	Report	Doi 69'	Attendance: 4,789; Referee: Hiroyuki Kimura

2011-11-16 Third round	Kawasaki Frontale	4 – 0	Oita Trinita	Todoroki Athletics Stadium, Kawasaki
19:00	Kobayashi 25'; Tasaka 55'; Kusukami 77'; Yajima 84'	Report		Attendance: 4,747; Referee: Hiroyoshi Takayama

2011-12-17 Fourth round	Kawasaki Frontale	0 – 1	Shonan Bellmare	Todoroki Athletics Stadium, Kawasaki
17:00		Report	Takayama 63'	Attendance: 8,291; Referee: Hajime Matsuo
