= 2009 J.League Cup =

J.League Yamazaki Nabisco Cup

Tournament details
- Country: Japan
- Dates: March 25 and November 3

Final positions
- Champions: FC Tokyo (2nd title)
- Runners-up: Kawasaki Frontale
- Semifinalists: Shimizu S-Pulse; Yokohama F. Marinos

Tournament statistics
- Matches played: 55

The 2009 J.League Cup, more widely known as the 2009 J.League Yamazaki Nabisco Cup, was the 34th edition of Japan soccer league cup tournament and the 17th edition under the current J.League Cup format. The championship started on March 25, 2009 and ended on November 3, with F.C. Tokyo defeating Kawasaki Frontale 2-0 in the Final. They qualified for the 2010 Suruga Bank Championship.

Teams from the 2009 J.League Division 1 took part in the tournament. Kashima Antlers, Kawasaki Frontale, Nagoya Grampus and Gamba Osaka were given a bye to the quarter-final due to the qualification for the AFC Champions League group stage. The rest of 14 started from the group stage, which divided them into two groups. The group winners and the runners-up of each group qualified for the quarter-final along with the four teams which qualified for the AFC Champions League.

== Group stage ==
=== Group A ===
| Team | Pld | W | D | L | GF | GA | GD | Pts |
|---|---|---|---|---|---|---|---|---|
| Urawa Red Diamonds | 6 | 4 | 1 | 1 | 11 | 4 | +7 | 13 |
| Yokohama F. Marinos | 6 | 3 | 2 | 1 | 12 | 6 | +6 | 11 |
| Sanfrecce Hiroshima | 6 | 3 | 1 | 2 | 17 | 8 | +9 | 10 |
| Ōita Trinita | 6 | 1 | 5 | 0 | 10 | 9 | +1 | 8 |
| Omiya Ardija | 6 | 2 | 1 | 3 | 6 | 17 | −11 | 7 |
| Júbilo Iwata | 6 | 1 | 3 | 2 | 4 | 5 | −1 | 6 |
| Albirex Niigata | 6 | 0 | 1 | 5 | 2 | 13 | −11 | 1 |

2009-03-25
| Sanfrecce Hiroshima | 1–0 | Urawa Red Diamonds |
| Júbilo Iwata | 0–0 | Yokohama F. Marinos |
| Omiya Ardija | 2–1 | Albirex Niigata |
2009-03-29
| Albirex Niigata | 0–0 | Júbilo Iwata |
| Ōita Trinita | 0–0 | Omiya Ardija |
| Yokohama F. Marinos | 0–1 | Urawa Red Diamonds |
2009-05-20
| Omiya Ardija | 1–0 | Júbilo Iwata |
| Yokohama F. Marinos | 3–1 | Sanfrecce Hiroshima |
| Ōita Trinita | 1–1 | Urawa Red Diamonds |
2009-05-30
| Sanfrecce Hiroshima | 7–0 | Omiya Ardija |
| Urawa Red Diamonds | 2–0 | Albirex Niigata |
| Yokohama F. Marinos | 3–3 | Ōita Trinita |
2009-06-03
| Urawa Red Diamonds | 1–0 | Júbilo Iwata |
| Albirex Niigata | 0–3 | Yokohama F. Marinos |
| Ōita Trinita | 2–2 | Sanfrecce Hiroshima |
2009-06-07
| Sanfrecce Hiroshima | 5–1 | Albirex Niigata |
| Omiya Ardija | 1–3 | Yokohama F. Marinos |
| Júbilo Iwata | 2–2 | Ōita Trinita |
2009-06-13
| Urawa Red Diamonds | 6–2 | Omiya Ardija |
| Albirex Niigata | 1–2 | Ōita Trinita |
| Júbilo Iwata | 2–1 | Sanfrecce Hiroshima |

=== Group B ===
| Team | Pld | W | D | L | GF | GA | GD | Pts |
|---|---|---|---|---|---|---|---|---|
| F.C. Tokyo | 6 | 4 | 1 | 1 | 10 | 6 | +4 | 13 |
| Shimizu S-Pulse | 6 | 4 | 0 | 2 | 9 | 7 | +2 | 12 |
| Kashiwa Reysol | 6 | 3 | 2 | 1 | 12 | 5 | +7 | 11 |
| JEF United Chiba | 6 | 2 | 2 | 2 | 6 | 6 | 0 | 8 |
| Montedio Yamagata | 6 | 2 | 1 | 3 | 6 | 7 | −1 | 7 |
| Vissel Kobe | 6 | 2 | 1 | 3 | 4 | 7 | −3 | 7 |
| Kyoto Sanga | 6 | 0 | 1 | 5 | 3 | 12 | −9 | 1 |

2009-03-25
| Kashiwa Reysol | 3–1 | F.C. Tokyo |
| Vissel Kobe | 1–1 | JEF United Chiba |
| Montedio Yamagata | 3–1 | Kyoto Sanga |
2009-03-29
| Shimizu S-Pulse | 2–0 | Kyoto Sanga |
| F.C. Tokyo | 1–0 | Vissel Kobe |
| JEF United Chiba | 1–1 | Kashiwa Reysol |
2009-05-20
| JEF United Chiba | 0–1 | F.C. Tokyo |
| Shimizu S-Pulse | 0–1 | Montedio Yamagata |
| Kyoto Sanga | 0–1 | Vissel Kobe |
2009-05-30
| Montedio Yamagata | 0–1 | JEF United Chiba |
| Kyoto Sanga | 1–1 | F.C. Tokyo |
| Kashiwa Reysol | 1–2 | Shimizu S-Pulse |
2009-06-03
| Kashiwa Reysol | 3–0 | Vissel Kobe |
| Shimizu S-Pulse | 2–1 | JEF United Chiba |
| F.C. Tokyo | 3–1 | Montedio Yamagata |
2009-06-07
| Montedio Yamagata | 1–1 | Kashiwa Reysol |
| Vissel Kobe | 1–2 | Shimizu S-Pulse |
| JEF United Chiba | 2–1 | Kyoto Sanga |
2009-06-13
| F.C. Tokyo | 3–1 | Shimizu S-Pulse |
| Kyoto Sanga | 3–0 | Kashiwa Reysol |
| Vissel Kobe | 1–0 | Montedio Yamagata |

== Knockout stage ==
All times are Japan Standard Time (UTC+9)

Quarterfinals
Kashima Antlers | 1 | 0 | 1
Kawasaki Frontale | 0 | 3 | 3
Gamba Osaka | 1 | 2 | 3
Yokohama F. Marinos | 3 | 1 | 4
Urawa Red Diamonds | 2 | 0 | 2
Shimizu S-Pulse | 1 | 3 | 4
FC Tokyo | 5 | 1 | 6
Nagoya Grampus | 1 | 2 | 3

Semifinals
Kawasaki Frontale | 2 | 1 | 3
Yokohama F. Marinos | 0 | 1 | 1
Shimizu S-Pulse | 2 | 0 | 2
FC Tokyo | 2 | 1 | 3

Finals
Kawasaki Frontale
FC Tokyo

=== Quarter finals ===
==== First leg ====
2009-07-15
19:00

| Kashima Antlers | 1–0 | Kawasaki Frontale |
|---|---|---|
| Ogasawara 83' | (Report) |

Kashima Soccer Stadium, Kashima
Attendance: 7,395
Referee: Nobutsugu Murakami

2009-07-15
19:00

| Gamba Osaka | 1–3 | Yokohama F. Marinos |
|---|---|---|
| Nakazawa 49' | (Report) | Yamase 40'; Sakata 68'; Matsuda 85' |

Osaka Expo '70 Stadium, Suita
Attendance: 7,102
Referee: Yuichi Nishimura

2009-07-15
19:30

| Urawa Red Diamonds | 2–1 | Shimizu S-Pulse |
|---|---|---|
| Tulio 24'; Edmilson 60' | (Report) | Edamura 48' |

Saitama Stadium, Saitama
Attendance: 21,271
Referee: Ryuji Sato

2009-07-15
19:30

| F.C. Tokyo | 5–1 | Nagoya Grampus |
|---|---|---|
| Hirayama 3'; Yonemoto 10'; Ishikawa 11'; Nagatomo 26'; 75' (o.g.) | (Report) | Ogawa 53' |

Ajinomoto Stadium, Chōfu
Attendance: 12,226
Referee: Kazuhiko Matsumura

==== Second leg ====
2009-07-29
19:00

| Kawasaki Frontale | 3–0 (a.e.t.) | Kashima Antlers |
|---|---|---|
| Juninho 89'; Renatinho 94'; Chong Tese 102' | (Report) |

Todoroki Athletics Stadium, Kawasaki
Attendance: 13,581
Referee: Hiroyoshi Takayama

2009-07-29
19:30

| Yokohama F. Marinos | 1–2 | Gamba Osaka |
|---|---|---|
| Hasegawa 23' | (Report) | Myojin 16'; Leandro 74' |

Mitsuzawa Stadium, Yokohama
Attendance: 9,133
Referee: Masaaki Iemoto

2009-07-29
19:00

| Shimizu S-Pulse | 3–0 | Urawa Red Diamonds |
|---|---|---|
| Abe 0' (o.g.); Okazaki 44'; Aoyama 62' | (Report) |

Outsorcing Stadium, Shizuoka
Attendance: 12,014
Referee: Minoru Tojo

2009-07-29
19:00

| Nagoya Grampus | 2–1 | F.C. Tokyo |
|---|---|---|
| Maki 33'; Yoshida 65' | (Report) | Hirayama 85' |

Mizuho Athletic Stadium, Nagoya
Attendance: 6,463
Referee: Joji Kashihara

=== Semi finals ===
==== First leg ====
2009-09-02
19:00

| Kawasaki Frontale | 2–0 | Yokohama F. Marinos |
|---|---|---|
| Chong Tese 15'; Juninho 57' | (Report) |

Todoroki Athletics Stadium, Kawasaki
Attendance: 11,850
Referee: Joji Kashihara

2009-09-02
19:00

| Shimizu S-Pulse | 2–2 | F.C. Tokyo |
|---|---|---|
| Johnsen 34'; Edamura 69' | (Report) | Yonemoto 33'; Cabore 42' |

Outsorcing Stadium, Shizuoka
Attendance: 10,026
Referee: Masaaki Iemoto

==== Second leg ====
2009-09-06
18:00

| Yokohama F. Marinos | 1–1 | Kawasaki Frontale |
|---|---|---|
| Yamase 68' | (Report) | Juninho 89' |

Nissan Stadium, Yokohama
Attendance: 16,467
Referee: Kenji Ogiya

2009-09-06
18:00

| F.C. Tokyo | 1–0 | Shimizu S-Pulse |
|---|---|---|
| Hirayama 16' | (Report) |

Ajinomoto Stadium, Chōfu
Attendance: 22,181
Referee: Toshimitsu Yoshida

=== Final ===
2009-11-03
14:09

| F.C. Tokyo | 2–0 | Kawasaki Frontale |
|---|---|---|
| Yonemoto 22'; Hirayama 59' | (Report) |

National Stadium, Tokyo
Attendance: 44,308
Referee: Shinji Murakami

F.C. Tokyo:
| GK | 20 | (Japan) Shuichi Gonda |
| RB | 33 | (Japan) Kenta Mukuhara |
| CB | 4 | (Brazil) Bruno Quadros |
| CB | 6 | (Japan) Yasuyuki Konno |
| LB | 3 | (Japan) Yuhei Tokunaga |
| DM | 28 | (Japan) Takuji Yonemoto | (yellow card) 58' |
| CM | 10 | (Japan) Yohei Kajiyama |
| RM | 40 | (Japan) Tatsuya Suzuki | (substituted off) 86' |
| LM | 22 | (Japan) Naotake Hanyu | (yellow card) 62' (substituted off) 74' |
| CF | 24 | (Japan) Shingo Akamine | (substituted off) 60' |
| CF | 13 | (Japan) Sōta Hirayama |
Substitutes:
| GK | 1 | (Japan) Hitoshi Shiota |
| DF | 3 | (Japan) Hideki Sahara (substituted on) 86' |
| DF | 5 | (Japan) Yuto Nagatomo (substituted on) 60' |
| DF | 8 | (Japan) Ryuji Fujiyama |
| DF | 15 | (Japan) Daishi Hiramatsu (substituted on) 74' |
| FW | 14 | (Japan) Hokuto Nakamura |
| FW | 32 | (Japan) Yusuke Kondo |
Manager:
(Japan) Hiroshi Jofuku

Kawasaki Frontale:
| GK | 1 | (Japan) Eiji Kawashima |
| RB | 19 | (Japan) Yusuke Mori |
| CB | 17 | (Japan) Kosuke Kikuchi |
| CB | 2 | (Japan) Hiroki Ito |
| LB | 26 | (Japan) Kazuhiro Murakami | (substituted off) 70' |
| DM | 29 | (Japan) Hiroyuki Taniguchi |
| DM | 18 | (Japan) Tomonobu Yokoyama | (yellow card) 24' (substituted off) 84' |
| AM | 14 | (Japan) Kengo Nakamura |
| RW | 34 | (Brazil) Renatinho | (substituted off) 79' |
| LW | 10 | (Brazil) Juninho |
| CF | 9 | (North Korea) Chong Tese |
Substitutes:
| GK | 28 | (Japan) Rikihiro Sugiyama |
| DF | 13 | (Japan) Shuhei Terada |
| DF | 4 | (Japan) Yusuke Igawa |
| MF | 6 | (Japan) Yusuke Tasaka (substituted on) 70' |
| MF | 8 | (Japan) Satoru Yamagishi |
| FW | 23 | (Japan) Kyohei Noborizato (substituted on) 84' |
| FW | 7 | (Japan) Masaru Kurotsu (substituted on) 79' |
Manager:
(Japan) Takashi Sekizuka

== Top goalscorers ==
| Goalscorers | Goals | Team |
|---|---|---|
| (Brazil) Cabore | 5 | F.C. Tokyo |
| (Japan) Koji Yamase | 5 | Yokohama F. Marinos |
| (Japan) Hisato Sato | 5 | Sanfrecce Hiroshima |
| (Japan) Kazuma Watanabe | 4 | Yokohama F. Marinos |
| (Japan) Sōta Hirayama | 4 | F.C. Tokyo |

== Awards ==
- MVP: Takuji Yonemoto – FC Tokyo (Japan)
- New Hero Prize: Takuji Yonemoto – FC Tokyo (Japan)

== See also ==
- 2009 J.League
- 2009 Emperor's Cup
