= 2013 Kawasaki Frontale season =

Kawasaki Frontale
2013 season
- Manager: Yahiro Kazama
- Stadium: Kawasaki Todoroki Stadium
- J1 League: 3 rd

2013 Kawasaki Frontale season.

== J1 League ==
Match	Date	Team	Score	Team	Venue	Attendance
1	2013.03.03	Kashiwa Reysol	3-1	Kawasaki Frontale	Hitachi Kashiwa Stadium	13,785
2	2013.03.09	Kawasaki Frontale	1-1	Oita Trinita	Tokyo National Stadium	21,657
3	2013.03.16	Sagan Tosu	5-4	Kawasaki Frontale	Best Amenity Stadium	8,716
4	2013.03.30	Kawasaki Frontale	1-1	Ventforet Kofu	Kawasaki Todoroki Stadium	14,108
5	2013.04.06	Shonan Bellmare	1-1	Kawasaki Frontale	Shonan BMW Stadium Hiratsuka	7,347
6	2013.04.13	Yokohama F. Marinos	2-1	Kawasaki Frontale	Nissan Stadium	27,204
7	2013.04.20	Kawasaki Frontale	4-2	Vegalta Sendai	Kawasaki Todoroki Stadium	14,739
8	2013.04.27	FC Tokyo	2-0	Kawasaki Frontale	Ajinomoto Stadium	26,555
9	2013.05.03	Kawasaki Frontale	2-1	Nagoya Grampus	Kawasaki Todoroki Stadium	16,292
10	2013.05.06	Shimizu S-Pulse	1-2	Kawasaki Frontale	IAI Stadium Nihondaira	16,829
11	2013.05.11	Kawasaki Frontale	2-2	Cerezo Osaka	Kawasaki Todoroki Stadium	12,345
12	2013.05.18	Júbilo Iwata	2-4	Kawasaki Frontale	Yamaha Stadium	10,429
13	2013.05.25	Kawasaki Frontale	2-1	Albirex Niigata	Kawasaki Todoroki Stadium	16,002
14	2013.07.06	Kawasaki Frontale	4-2	Kashima Antlers	Kawasaki Todoroki Stadium	18,447
15	2013.07.10	Sanfrecce Hiroshima	4-2	Kawasaki Frontale	Edion Stadium Hiroshima	10,236
16	2013.07.13	Kawasaki Frontale	4-0	Urawa Reds	Kawasaki Todoroki Stadium	19,010
17	2013.07.17	Omiya Ardija	2-3	Kawasaki Frontale	NACK5 Stadium Omiya	7,412
18	2013.07.31	Kawasaki Frontale	1-2	Shonan Bellmare	Kawasaki Todoroki Stadium	15,934
19	2013.08.03	Vegalta Sendai	2-1	Kawasaki Frontale	Yurtec Stadium Sendai	14,365
20	2013.08.10	Kawasaki Frontale	2-2	FC Tokyo	Kawasaki Todoroki Stadium	17,864
21	2013.08.17	Ventforet Kofu	1-3	Kawasaki Frontale	Yamanashi Chuo Bank Stadium	12,657
22	2013.08.24	Albirex Niigata	2-1	Kawasaki Frontale	Tohoku Denryoku Big Swan Stadium	28,342
23	2013.08.28	Kawasaki Frontale	2-1	Omiya Ardija	Kawasaki Todoroki Stadium	14,026
24	2013.08.31	Cerezo Osaka	0-0	Kawasaki Frontale	Osaka Nagai Stadium	30,579
25	2013.09.14	Kawasaki Frontale	2-0	Sanfrecce Hiroshima	Kawasaki Todoroki Stadium	17,390
26	2013.09.21	Kawasaki Frontale	0-1	Sagan Tosu	Kawasaki Todoroki Stadium	18,090
27	2013.09.28	Nagoya Grampus	1-2	Kawasaki Frontale	Nagoya Mizuho Athletic Stadium	12,013
28	2013.10.06	Kawasaki Frontale	3-1	Kashiwa Reysol	Kawasaki Todoroki Stadium	14,388
29	2013.10.19	Kawasaki Frontale	2-1	Júbilo Iwata	Kawasaki Todoroki Stadium	17,523
30	2013.10.27	Kashima Antlers	4-1	Kawasaki Frontale	Kashima Soccer Stadium	18,293
31	2013.11.10	Kawasaki Frontale	2-0	Shimizu S-Pulse	Kawasaki Todoroki Stadium	14,986
32	2013.11.23	Urawa Reds	1-3	Kawasaki Frontale	Saitama Stadium 2002	45,607
33	2013.11.30	Oita Trinita	0-1	Kawasaki Frontale	Oita Bank Dome	10,639
34	2013.12.07	Kawasaki Frontale	1-0	Yokohama F. Marinos	Kawasaki Todoroki Stadium	20,151
