= Rikihiro Sugiyama =

Japanese footballer (born 1987)

Rikihiro Sugiyama 杉山 力裕
Personal information
- Full name: Rikihiro Sugiyama
- Date of birth: May 1, 1987 (age 39)
- Place of birth: Shizuoka, Japan
- Height: 1.84 m (6 ft 0 in)
- Position: Goalkeeper

Youth career
- 2003–2005: Shizuoka Gakuen High School

Senior career*
Years	Team	Apps	(Gls)
2006–2014	Kawasaki Frontale	44	(0)
2015–2016	Shimizu S-Pulse	44	(0)
2017–2022	Avispa Fukuoka	50	(0)
Medal record
Kawasaki Frontale
Runner-up	J1 League	2006
Runner-up	J1 League	2008
Runner-up	J1 League	2009
Runner-up	J.League Cup	2007
Runner-up	J.League Cup	2009
- * Club domestic league appearances and goals as of 21:36, 14 April 2023 (UTC)

Rikihiro Sugiyama (杉山 力裕, Sugiyama Rikihiro; born May 1, 1987 in Shizuoka, Japan) is a Japanese former professional footballer who played as a goalkeeper.

== Career statistics ==
Appearances and goals by club, season and competition
Club performance			League		Cup		League Cup		Total	
Season	Club	League	Apps	Goals	Apps	Goals	Apps	Goals	Apps	Goals
Japan			League		Emperor's Cup		J. League Cup		Total	
2006	Kawasaki Frontale	J1 League	0	0	0	0	0	0	0	0
2007	Kawasaki Frontale	J1 League	0	0	0	0	0	0	0	0
2008	Kawasaki Frontale	J1 League	0	0	0	0	0	0	0	0
2009	Kawasaki Frontale	J1 League	0	0	3	0	2	0	5	0
2010	Kawasaki Frontale	J1 League	1	0	0	0	0	0	1	0
2011	Kawasaki Frontale	J1 League	13	0	3	0	2	0	18	0
2012	Kawasaki Frontale	J1 League	5	0	2	0	1	0	8	0
2013	Kawasaki Frontale	J1 League	11	0	2	0	7	0	20	0
2014	Kawasaki Frontale	J1 League	14	0	1	0	3	0	18	0
2015	Shimizu S-Pulse	J1 League	24	0	0	0	3	0	27	0
2016	Shimizu S-Pulse	J2 League	20	0	0	0	–		20	0
2017	Avispa Fukuoka	J2 League	32 (Note: Includes J1/J2 promotion play-offs)	0	0	0	–		32	0
2018	Avispa Fukuoka	J2 League	16	0	1	0	–		17	0
2019	Avispa Fukuoka	J2 League	1	0	0	0	–		1	0
2020	Avispa Fukuoka	J2 League	2	0	0	0	–		2	0
2021	Avispa Fukuoka	J1 League	1	0	0	0	1	0	2	0
2022	Avispa Fukuoka	J1 League	0	0	0	0	0	0	0	0
Total			140	0	12	0	19	0	171	0
