= Tomonobu Yokoyama =

Japanese footballer (1985–2024)

Tomonobu Yokoyama 横山 知伸
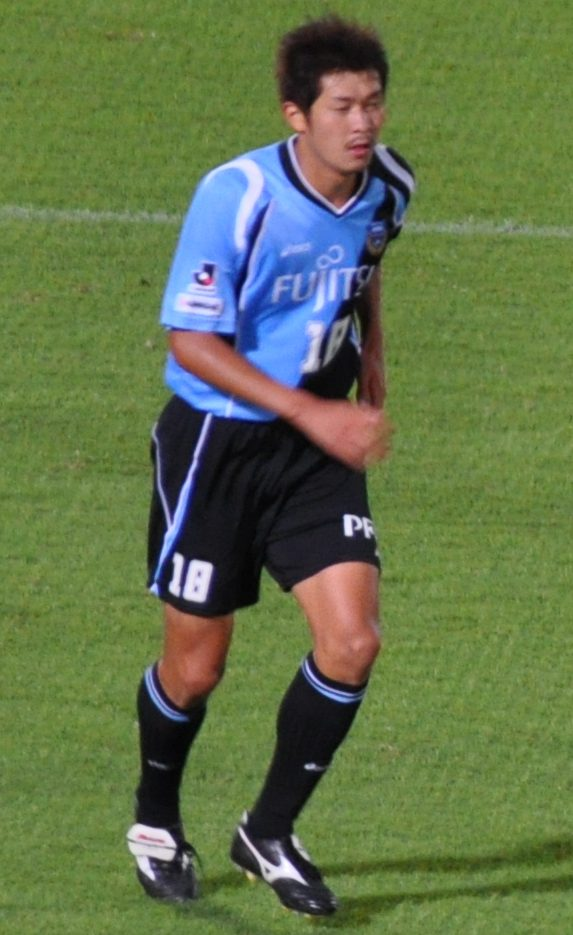
- Yokoyama in 2010

Personal information
- Date of birth: 18 March 1985
- Place of birth: Nerima, Tokyo, Japan
- Date of death: 4 January 2024 (aged 38)
- Height: 1.84 m (6 ft 0 in)
- Positions: Defensive midfielder; centre-back

Youth career
- 2004–2007: Waseda University

Senior career*
Years	Team	Apps	(Gls)
2008–2011	Kawasaki Frontale	76	(1)
2012–2013	Cerezo Osaka	20	(3)
2014–2017	Omiya Ardija	81	(4)
2017–2018	Hokkaido Consadole Sapporo	26	(2)
2018	→ Roasso Kumamoto (loan)	7	(0)
2019	FC Gifu	0	(0)
Medal record
Kawasaki Frontale
Runner-up	J1 League	2008
Runner-up	J1 League	2009
Runner-up	J.League Cup	2009
- * Club domestic league appearances and goals

Tomonobu Yokoyama (横山 知伸, Yokoyama Tomonobu; 18 March 1985 – 4 January 2024) was a Japanese professional footballer who played as a defensive midfielder or centre-back.

== Career ==
On 5 February 2020, FC Gifu confirmed that 34-year old Yokoyama had decided to retire. He died from a brain tumour on 4 January 2024, at the age of 38.

== Career statistics ==
As of 2 January 2020

Appearances and goals by club, season and competition
Club	Season	League			Emperor's Cup		J.League Cup		Asia		Total	
Club	Season	Division	Apps	Goals	Apps	Goals	Apps	Goals	Apps	Goals	Apps	Goals
Kawasaki Frontale	2008	J1 League	16	0	0	0	3	0	–		19	0
Kawasaki Frontale	2009	J1 League	26	0	3	0	3	0	9	0	41	0
Kawasaki Frontale	2010	J1 League	24	0	4	0	2	1	2	0	32	1
Kawasaki Frontale	2011	J1 League	10	1	0	0	2	0	–		12	0
Cerezo Osaka	2012	J1 League	9	2	4	0	2	0	–		15	2
Cerezo Osaka	2013	J1 League	11	1	3	0	3	0	–		17	1
Omiya Ardija	2014	J1 League	21	0	1	0	4	0	–		26	0
Omiya Ardija	2015	J2 League	41	3	1	0	–		–		42	3
Omiya Ardija	2016	J1 League	19	1	3	0	4	0	–		26	1
Hokkaido Consadole Sapporo	2017	J1 League	26	2	0	0	4	0	–		30	2
Hokkaido Consadole Sapporo	2018	J1 League	0	0	0	0	4	0	–		4	0
Roasso Kumamoto (loan)	2018	J2 League	7	0	–		–		–		7	0
FC Gifu	2019	J2 League	0	0	–		–		–		0	0
Career total			210	10	19	0	31	1	11	0	271	11
