= Hideki Sahara =

Japanese footballer

Hideki Sahara 佐原 秀樹
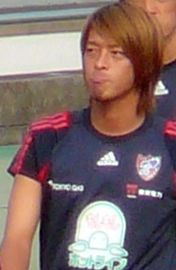

Personal information
- Full name: Hideki Sahara
- Date of birth: May 15, 1978 (age 48)
- Place of birth: Yokohama, Kanagawa, Japan
- Height: 1.84 m (6 ft 1/2 in)
- Position: Defender

Team information
- Current team: Kawasaki Frontale (Assistant Manager)

Youth career
- 1994–1996: Toko Gakuen High School

Senior career*
| Years | Team | Apps | (Gls) |
| 1997–2010 | Kawasaki Frontale | 140 | (3) |
| 1997 | → Grêmio (loan) | | |
| 2008–2009 | → FC Tokyo (loan) | 35 | (2) |
| Total | | 175 | (5) |

Managerial career
- 2025–: Kawasaki Frontale (assistant)
Medal record
Kawasaki Frontale
| Runner-up | J1 League | 2006 |
| Runner-up | J.League Cup | 2000 |
| Runner-up | J.League Cup | 2007 |
FC Tokyo
| Winner | J.League Cup | 2009 |
- * Club domestic league appearances and goals

Hideki Sahara (佐原 秀樹, Sahara Hideki; born May 15, 1978) is a former Japanese football player. He is currently the assistant manager of J1 League club, Kawasaki Frontale.

== Playing career ==
Sahara was born in Yokohama on May 15, 1978. After graduating from high school, he joined Japan Football League club Kawasaki Frontale in 1997. He debuted and played many matches in 1998 and the club was promoted to new league J2 League from 1999. In 1999, he became a regular player as center back of three backs defense with Tetsuo Nakanishi and Takumi Morikawa. The club also won the champions and was promoted to J1 League from 2000. In early 2000, although he played as regular player, he was hurt and could not play at all in the match for about 2 seasons. The club was also relegated to J2 from 2001. Although he returned in 2002, he could not play many matches behind Hiroki Ito, Yoshinobu Minowa and Kazunari Okayama. From 2004, although he was 4th defender behind Ito Minowa and Shuhei Terada, he played many matches and the club won the champions and was promoted to J1 from 2005. In 2007, he moved to FC Tokyo on loan. He played many matches as center back in 2008. Although he could not play many matches for injury in 2009, the club won the champions 2009 J.League Cup by defeating Kawasaki Frontale at Final. In 2010, he returned to Kawasaki Frontale and retired at the end of the 2010 season.

== Club statistics ==
| Club performance | | | League | | Cup | | League Cup | | Continental | | Total | |
| Season | Club | League | Apps | Goals | Apps | Goals | Apps | Goals | Apps | Goals | Apps | Goals |
| Japan | | | League | | Emperor's Cup | | J.League Cup | | Asia | | Total | |
|---|---|---|---|---|---|---|---|---|---|---|---|---|
| 1997 | Kawasaki Frontale | Football League | 0 | 0 | 0 | 0 | - | | - | | 0 | 0 |
| 1998 | Kawasaki Frontale | Football League | 14 | 0 | 1 | 0 | 3 | 0 | - | | 18 | 0 |
| 1999 | Kawasaki Frontale | J2 League | 28 | 1 | 2 | 0 | 2 | 0 | - | | 32 | 1 |
| 2000 | Kawasaki Frontale | J1 League | 5 | 0 | 0 | 0 | 0 | 0 | - | | 5 | 0 |
| 2001 | Kawasaki Frontale | J2 League | 0 | 0 | 0 | 0 | 0 | 0 | - | | 0 | 0 |
| 2002 | Kawasaki Frontale | J2 League | 13 | 1 | 2 | 0 | - | | - | | 15 | 1 |
| 2003 | Kawasaki Frontale | J2 League | 0 | 0 | 0 | 0 | - | | - | | 0 | 0 |
| 2004 | Kawasaki Frontale | J2 League | 22 | 1 | 1 | 0 | - | | - | | 23 | 1 |
| 2005 | Kawasaki Frontale | J1 League | 23 | 0 | 1 | 0 | 3 | 0 | - | | 27 | 0 |
| 2006 | Kawasaki Frontale | J1 League | 15 | 0 | 1 | 0 | 6 | 0 | - | | 22 | 0 |
| 2007 | Kawasaki Frontale | J1 League | 13 | 0 | 0 | 0 | 2 | 0 | 2 | 0 | 17 | 0 |
| 2008 | FC Tokyo | J1 League | 28 | 2 | 4 | 0 | 2 | 0 | - | | 34 | 2 |
| 2009 | FC Tokyo | J1 League | 7 | 0 | 5 | 0 | 3 | 1 | - | | 15 | 1 |
| 2010 | Kawasaki Frontale | J1 League | 7 | 0 | 1 | 0 | 1 | 0 | 0 | 0 | 9 | 0 |
| Career total | | | 175 | 5 | 16 | 1 | 24 | 0 | 2 | 0 | 217 | 6 |
