= Tetsuya Oishi =

Japanese footballer (born 1979)

Tetsuya Oishi 大石 鉄也
Personal information
- Full name: Tetsuya Oishi
- Date of birth: November 26, 1979 (age 46)
- Place of birth: Shizuoka, Japan
- Height: 1.70 m (5 ft 7 in)
- Position: Midfielder

Youth career
- 1995–1997: Shizuoka Gakuen High School

Senior career*
Years	Team	Apps	(Gls)
1998–2004	Kawasaki Frontale	20	(1)
2002–2003	→ Ventforet Kofu (loan)	32	(0)
Total		52	(1)
Medal record
Kawasaki Frontale
Runner-up	J.League Cup	2000
- * Club domestic league appearances and goals

Tetsuya Oishi (大石 鉄也, Oishi Tetsuya; born November 26, 1979) is a former Japanese football player.

== Playing career ==
Oishi was born in Shizuoka Prefecture on November 26, 1979. After graduating from Shizuoka Gakuen High School, he joined Japan Football League club Kawasaki Frontale in 1998. Although the club was promoted to J2 League from 1999 and J1 League from 2000, he could hardly play in the match. Although he played many matches as midfielder, the club was relegated to J2 in a year. In 2002, he moved to J2 club Ventforet Kofu on loan. He played many matches in 2002. However he could hardly play in the match in 2003. In 2004, he returned to Kawasaki Frontale. However he could not play at all in the match and retired end of 2004 season.

== Career statistics ==
Appearances and goals by club, season and competition
Club	Season	League			Emperor's Cup		J.League Cup		Total	
Club	Season	Division	Apps	Goals	Apps	Goals	Apps	Goals	Apps	Goals
Kawasaki Frontale	1998	Football League	0	0					0	0
Kawasaki Frontale	1999	J2 League	5	0	3	0	0	0	8	0
Kawasaki Frontale	2000	J1 League	10	1	1	0	4	1	15	2
Kawasaki Frontale	2001	J2 League	5	0	0	0	2	0	7	0
Ventforet Kofu	2002	J2 League	29	0	1	0	—		30	0
Ventforet Kofu	2003	J2 League	3	0	1	0	—		4	0
Kawasaki Frontale	2004	J2 League	0	0	0	0	—		0	0
Career total			52	1	6	0	6	1	64	2
