= 2007 Kawasaki Frontale season =

Kawasaki Frontale
2007 season
- Manager: Takashi Sekizuka
- Stadium: Todoroki Athletics Stadium
- J. League 1: 5th
- Emperor's Cup: Semi-final
- J. League Cup: Runners-up
- AFC Champions League: Quarter-final
- Top goalscorer: Juninho (22)

2007 Kawasaki Frontale season

== Competitions ==
Competitions	Position
J. League 1	5th / 18 clubs
Emperor's Cup	Semifinals
J. League Cup	Runners-up

== Results ==
=== J. League 1 ===
Match	Date	Venue	Opponents	Score
1	2007..	[[]]	[[]]	-
2	2007..	[[]]	[[]]	-
3	2007..	[[]]	[[]]	-
4	2007..	[[]]	[[]]	-
5	2007..	[[]]	[[]]	-
6	2007..	[[]]	[[]]	-
7	2007..	[[]]	[[]]	-
8	2007..	[[]]	[[]]	-
9	2007..	[[]]	[[]]	-
10	2007..	[[]]	[[]]	-
11	2007..	[[]]	[[]]	-
12	2007..	[[]]	[[]]	-
13	2007..	[[]]	[[]]	-
14	2007..	[[]]	[[]]	-
15	2007..	[[]]	[[]]	-
16	2007..	[[]]	[[]]	-
17	2007..	[[]]	[[]]	-
18	2007..	[[]]	[[]]	-
19	2007..	[[]]	[[]]	-
20	2007..	[[]]	[[]]	-
21	2007..	[[]]	[[]]	-
22	2007..	[[]]	[[]]	-
23	2007..	[[]]	[[]]	-
24	2007..	[[]]	[[]]	-
25	2007..	[[]]	[[]]	-
26	2007..	[[]]	[[]]	-
27	2007..	[[]]	[[]]	-
28	2007..	[[]]	[[]]	-
29	2007..	[[]]	[[]]	-
30	2007..	[[]]	[[]]	-
31	2007..	[[]]	[[]]	-
32	2007..	[[]]	[[]]	-
33	2007..	[[]]	[[]]	-
34	2007..	[[]]	[[]]	-

=== Emperor's Cup ===
Match	Date	Venue	Opponents	Score
4th Round	2007..	[[]]	[[]]	-
5th Round	2007..	[[]]	[[]]	-
Quarterfinals	2007..	[[]]	[[]]	-
Semifinals	2007..	[[]]	[[]]	-

=== J. League Cup ===
Match	Date	Venue	Opponents	Score
Quarterfinals-1	2007..	[[]]	[[]]	-
Quarterfinals-2	2007..	[[]]	[[]]	-
Semifinals-1	2007..	[[]]	[[]]	-
Semifinals-2	2007..	[[]]	[[]]	-
Final	2007..	[[]]	[[]]	-

=== AFC Champions League ===
==== Group stage ====
Team	Pld	W	D	L	GF	GA	GD	Pts
(Japan) Kawasaki Frontale	6	5	1	0	15	4	+11	16
(South Korea) Chunnam Dragons	6	3	1	2	7	8	−1	10
(Indonesia) Arema Malang	6	1	1	4	2	9	−7	4
(Thailand) Bangkok University	6	0	3	3	4	7	−3	3

7 March 2007	Arema Malang (Indonesia)	1–3	(Japan) Kawasaki Frontale	Gajayana Stadium, Malang, Indonesia
	Elie Aiboy 12'	(Report)	Magnum 1', 73'; Kengo Nakamura 82'	Attendance: 30,000; Referee: Naser Al-Ghafary (Jordan)

21 March 2007	Kawasaki Frontale (Japan)	1–1	(Thailand) Bangkok University	Todoroki Athletics Stadium, Kawasaki, Japan
	Patiparn Phetphun 78' (o.g.)	(Report)	Suriya Domtaisong 7'	Attendance: 10,816; Referee: Shamsul Maidin (Singapore)

11 April 2007	Chunnam Dragons (South Korea)	1–3	(Japan) Kawasaki Frontale	Gwang-Yang Stadium, Gwangyang, South Korea
	Kang Min-Soo 90'	(Report)	Juninho 29' (pen.) 70'; Magnum 57'	Attendance: 5,703; Referee: Khalil Al Ghamdi (Saudi Arabia)

25 April 2007	Kawasaki Frontale (Japan)	3–0	(South Korea) Chunnam Dragons	Todoroki Athletics Stadium, Kawasaki, Japan
	Juninho 25'; Chong Tese 81', 87'	(Report)		Attendance: 10,070; Referee: Ben Williams (Australia)

9 May 2007	Kawasaki Frontale (Japan)	3–0	(Indonesia) Arema Malang	Todoroki Athletics Stadium, Kawasaki, Japan
	Kengo Nakamura 4', 70'; Taku Harada 80'	(Report)		Attendance: 9,453; Referee: Minh Tri Vo (Vietnam)

23 May 2007	Bangkok University (Thailand)	1–2	(Japan) Kawasaki Frontale	Royal Thai Army Stadium, Bangkok, Thailand
	Ekkaphan Petvises 40'	(Report)	Taku Harada 17'; Takahisa Nishiyama 63'	Referee: Rosdi Shaharul (Malaysia)

==== Knockout stage ====
19 September 2007 Quarter-final, first leg	Sepahan (Iran)	0–0	(Japan) Kawasaki Frontale	Foolad Shahr Stadium, Isfahan, Iran
		Report		Attendance: 25,000; Referee: Jasim Karim (Bahrain)

26 September 2007 Quarter-final, second leg	Kawasaki Frontale (Japan)	0–0 (4–5 p)	(Iran) Sepahan	Todoroki Athletics Stadium, Kawasaki, Japan
		Report		Attendance: 13,507; Referee: Saad Kameel Al Fadhli (Kuwait)
	Penalties
	Juninho (penalty scored); Kazuki Ganaha (penalty scored); Masahiro Ohashi (penalty scored); Hiroyuki Taniguchi (penalty missed); Shuhei Terada (penalty scored)		(penalty scored) Hadi Aghili; (penalty scored) Moharram Navidkia; (penalty scored) Abu Al-Hail; (penalty scored) Farshad Bahadorani; (penalty scored) Jalal Akbari

== Player statistics ==
No.	Pos.	Player	D.o.B. (Age)	Height / Weight	J. League 1		Emperor's Cup		J. League Cup		Total	
No.	Pos.	Player	D.o.B. (Age)	Height / Weight	Apps	Goals	Apps	Goals	Apps	Goals	Apps	Goals
1	GK	Eiji Kawashima	March 20, 1983 (aged 23)	cm / kg	34	0						
2	DF	Hiroki Ito	July 27, 1978 (aged 28)	cm / kg	33	0						
3	DF	Hideki Sahara	May 15, 1978 (aged 28)	cm / kg	13	0						
4	DF	Yusuke Igawa	October 30, 1982 (aged 24)	cm / kg	19	1						
5	DF	Yoshinobu Minowa	June 2, 1976 (aged 30)	cm / kg	30	1						
6	MF	Takahiro Kawamura	October 4, 1979 (aged 27)	cm / kg	15	0						
7	FW	Masaru Kurotsu	August 20, 1982 (aged 24)	cm / kg	28	4						
8	MF	Francismar	April 18, 1984 (aged 22)	cm / kg	4	0						
9	FW	Kazuki Ganaha	September 26, 1980 (aged 26)	cm / kg	18	1						
10	FW	Juninho	September 15, 1977 (aged 29)	cm / kg	31	22						
11	MF	Magnum	March 24, 1982 (aged 24)	cm / kg	19	7						
13	DF	Shuhei Terada	June 23, 1975 (aged 31)	cm / kg	29	1						
14	MF	Kengo Nakamura	October 31, 1980 (aged 26)	cm / kg	30	4						
15	MF	Taku Harada	October 27, 1982 (aged 24)	cm / kg	7	0						
16	FW	Chong Te-Se	March 2, 1984 (aged 23)	cm / kg	24	12						
17	DF	Masayuki Ochiai	July 11, 1981 (aged 25)	cm / kg	9	0						
18	MF	Satoshi Hida	April 18, 1984 (aged 22)	cm / kg	1	0						
19	DF	Yusuke Mori	July 24, 1980 (aged 26)	cm / kg	30	1						
20	MF	Yuji Yabu	May 24, 1984 (aged 22)	cm / kg	5	1						
21	GK	Takashi Aizawa	January 5, 1982 (aged 25)	cm / kg	0	0						
22	GK	Yuki Uekusa	July 2, 1982 (aged 24)	cm / kg	0	0						
23	FW	Satoshi Kukino	April 16, 1987 (aged 19)	cm / kg	11	1						
24	MF	Masahiro Ōhashi	June 23, 1981 (aged 25)	cm / kg	17	4						
25	MF	Tatsuya Suzuki	February 29, 1988 (aged 19)	cm / kg	0	0						
26	MF	Kazuhiro Murakami	January 20, 1981 (aged 26)	cm / kg	22	4						
27	FW	Ken Tokura	June 16, 1986 (aged 20)	cm / kg	2	0						
28	GK	Rikihiro Sugiyama	May 1, 1987 (aged 19)	cm / kg	0	0						
29	MF	Hiroyuki Taniguchi	June 27, 1985 (aged 21)	cm / kg	31	2						
30	MF	Yuji Kimura	October 5, 1987 (aged 19)	cm / kg	0	0						
31	MF	Takahisa Nishiyama	July 11, 1985 (aged 21)	cm / kg	3	0						
32	DF	Masato Okubo	April 17, 1986 (aged 20)	cm / kg	0	0						
33	DF	Jun Sonoda	January 23, 1989 (aged 18)	cm / kg	0	0						
34	MF	Kyohei Sugiura	January 11, 1989 (aged 18)	cm / kg	0	0						
35	MF	Yusuke Tasaka	July 8, 1985 (aged 21)	cm / kg	1	0						

== Other pages ==
- (in Japanese) J. League official site
