= Naoki Urata =

Japanese footballer

Naoki Urata 浦田 尚希
Personal information
- Full name: Naoki Urata
- Date of birth: June 27, 1974 (age 52)
- Place of birth: Saitama, Japan
- Height: 1.72 m (5 ft 7 1/2 in)
- Position: Forward

Youth career
- 1990–1992: Bunan High School
- 1993–1996: Kokushikan University

Senior career*
Years	Team	Apps	(Gls)
1997–2001	Kawasaki Frontale	58	(10)
2002	Ventforet Kofu	10	(1)
Total		68	(11)
Medal record
Kawasaki Frontale
Runner-up	J.League Cup	2000
- * Club domestic league appearances and goals

Naoki Urata (浦田 尚希, Urata Naoki; born June 27, 1974) is a former Japanese football player.

== Playing career ==
Urata was born in Saitama Prefecture on June 27, 1974. After graduating from Kokushikan University, he joined Japan Football League club Kawasaki Frontale in 1997. He played many matches as substitute forward the club was promoted to new league J2 League from 1999. In 1999, he played many matches and he scored a winning goal against Sagan Tosu on November 5. The club's promotion to J1 League from 2000 decided at this match. However the club was relegated to J2 in a year and he could not play at all in the match for injury in 2001. In 2002, he moved to J2 club Ventforet Kofu and retired end of 2002 season.

== Club statistics ==
Club performance			League		Cup		League Cup		Total	
Season	Club	League	Apps	Goals	Apps	Goals	Apps	Goals	Apps	Goals
Japan			League		Emperor's Cup		J.League Cup		Total	
1997	Kawasaki Frontale	Football League	4	2	0	0	-		4	2
1998	Kawasaki Frontale	Football League	13	0	1	1	2	2	16	3
1999	Kawasaki Frontale	J2 League	28	6	2	2	1	0	31	8
2000	Kawasaki Frontale	J1 League	13	2	0	0	2	0	15	2
2001	Kawasaki Frontale	J2 League	0	0	0	0	1	0	1	0
2002	Ventforet Kofu	J2 League	10	1	0	0	-		10	1
Total			68	11	3	3	6	2	77	16
