= 2005 Kawasaki Frontale season =

Kawasaki Frontale
2005 season
- Manager: Takashi Sekizuka
- Stadium: Todoroki Athletics Stadium
- J. League 1: 8th
- Emperor's Cup: Quarterfinals
- J. League Cup: GL-B 2nd
- Top goalscorer: Juninho (16)

During the 2005 season, Kawasaki Frontale competed in the J. League 1, in which they finished 8th.

== Competitions ==
Competitions	Position
J. League 1	8th / 18 clubs
Emperor's Cup	Quarterfinals
J. League Cup	GL-B 2nd / 4 clubs

== Domestic results ==
=== J. League 1 ===
Match	Date	Venue	Opponents	Score
1	2005..	[[]]	[[]]	-
2	2005..	[[]]	[[]]	-
3	2005..	[[]]	[[]]	-
4	2005..	[[]]	[[]]	-
5	2005..	[[]]	[[]]	-
6	2005..	[[]]	[[]]	-
7	2005..	[[]]	[[]]	-
8	2005..	[[]]	[[]]	-
9	2005..	[[]]	[[]]	-
10	2005..	[[]]	[[]]	-
11	2005..	[[]]	[[]]	-
12	2005..	[[]]	[[]]	-
13	2005..	[[]]	[[]]	-
14	2005..	[[]]	[[]]	-
15	2005..	[[]]	[[]]	-
16	2005..	[[]]	[[]]	-
17	2005..	[[]]	[[]]	-
18	2005..	[[]]	[[]]	-
19	2005..	[[]]	[[]]	-
20	2005..	[[]]	[[]]	-
21	2005..	[[]]	[[]]	-
22	2005..	[[]]	[[]]	-
23	2005..	[[]]	[[]]	-
24	2005..	[[]]	[[]]	-
25	2005..	[[]]	[[]]	-
26	2005..	[[]]	[[]]	-
27	2005..	[[]]	[[]]	-
28	2005..	[[]]	[[]]	-
29	2005..	[[]]	[[]]	-
30	2005..	[[]]	[[]]	-
31	2005..	[[]]	[[]]	-
32	2005..	[[]]	[[]]	-
33	2005..	[[]]	[[]]	-
34	2005..	[[]]	[[]]	-

=== Emperor's Cup ===
Match	Date	Venue	Opponents	Score
4th Round	2005..	[[]]	[[]]	-
5th Round	2005..	[[]]	[[]]	-
Quarterfinals	2005..	[[]]	[[]]	-

=== J. League Cup ===
Match	Date	Venue	Opponents	Score
GL-B-1	2005..	[[]]	[[]]	-
GL-B-2	2005..	[[]]	[[]]	-
GL-B-3	2005..	[[]]	[[]]	-
GL-B-4	2005..	[[]]	[[]]	-
GL-B-5	2005..	[[]]	[[]]	-
GL-B-6	2005..	[[]]	[[]]	-

== Player statistics ==
No.	Pos.	Player	D.o.B. (Age)	Height / Weight	J. League 1		Emperor's Cup		J. League Cup		Total	
No.	Pos.	Player	D.o.B. (Age)	Height / Weight	Apps	Goals	Apps	Goals	Apps	Goals	Apps	Goals
1	GK	Shinya Yoshihara	April 19, 1978 (aged 26)	cm / kg	9	0						
2	DF	Hiroki Ito	July 27, 1978 (aged 26)	cm / kg	34	0						
3	DF	Hideki Sahara	May 15, 1978 (aged 26)	cm / kg	23	0						
4	MF	Augusto	November 5, 1968 (aged 36)	cm / kg	33	5						
5	DF	Yoshinobu Minowa	June 2, 1976 (aged 28)	cm / kg	30	2						
6	MF	Iwao Yamane	July 31, 1976 (aged 28)	cm / kg	3	0						
7	MF	Toru Oniki	April 20, 1974 (aged 30)	cm / kg	1	0						
8	MF	Tomoaki Kuno	September 25, 1973 (aged 31)	cm / kg	17	0						
9	FW	Kazuki Ganaha	September 26, 1980 (aged 24)	cm / kg	26	6						
10	FW	Juninho	September 15, 1977 (aged 27)	cm / kg	31	16						
11	MF	Marcus	February 25, 1974 (aged 31)	cm / kg	27	9						
13	DF	Shuhei Terada	June 23, 1975 (aged 29)	cm / kg	26	2						
14	MF	Kengo Nakamura	October 31, 1980 (aged 24)	cm / kg	29	2						
15	DF	Hiroyuki Kobayashi	April 18, 1980 (aged 24)	cm / kg	0	0						
16	FW	Kazunori Iio	February 23, 1982 (aged 23)	cm / kg	5	0						
17	MF	Chong Yong-De	February 4, 1978 (aged 27)	cm / kg	7	0						
18	MF	Akira Konno	September 12, 1974 (aged 30)	cm / kg	9	1						
19	FW	Hulk	July 25, 1986 (aged 18)	cm / kg	9	1						
20	MF	Yasuhiro Nagahashi	August 2, 1975 (aged 29)	cm / kg	31	1						
21	GK	Seigo Shimokawa	November 17, 1975 (aged 29)	cm / kg	3	0						
22	DF	Makoto Kimura	June 10, 1979 (aged 25)	cm / kg	1	0						
23	DF	Naoki Soma	July 19, 1971 (aged 33)	cm / kg	12	0						
24	FW	Masaru Kurotsu	August 20, 1982 (aged 22)	cm / kg	22	3						
25	DF	Yusuke Mori	July 24, 1980 (aged 24)	cm / kg	3	0						
26	MF	Satoshi Hida	April 18, 1984 (aged 20)	cm / kg	1	0						
27	FW	Ken Tokura	June 16, 1986 (aged 18)	cm / kg	3	0						
28	GK	Takashi Aizawa	January 5, 1982 (aged 23)	cm / kg	22	0						
29	MF	Hiroyuki Taniguchi	June 27, 1985 (aged 19)	cm / kg	25	5						
30	MF	Takumi Watanabe	March 15, 1982 (aged 22)	cm / kg	1	0						
31	MF	Takahisa Nishiyama	July 11, 1985 (aged 19)	cm / kg	0	0						
33	DF	Masato Okubo	April 17, 1986 (aged 18)	cm / kg	0	0						
34	GK	Yuki Uekusa	July 2, 1982 (aged 22)	cm / kg	0	0						
35	MF	Taku Harada	October 27, 1982 (aged 22)	cm / kg	12	0						
36	MF	Aragoney	March 7, 1987 (aged 17)	cm / kg	0	0						

== Other pages ==
- (in Japanese) J. League official site
