= Masahide =

- Gender: Male

Origin
- Origin: Japanese
- Meaning: Different meanings depending on the kanji used

Masahide (written: 正秀, 正英, 昌秀, 政秀, 政英 or 雅英) is a masculine Japanese given name. Notable people with the name include:

- Hirate Masahide (平手 政秀; 1492–1553), Japanese samurai
- Masahide Jinno (神野 正英; born 1948), Japanese sprinter
- Masahide Kanayama (金山 政英; 1909–1997), Japanese diplomat
- Masahide Kawamoto (川元 正英; born 1971), Japanese footballer
- Masahide Kobayashi (小林 雅英; born 1974), Japanese baseball player
- Mizuta Masahide (水田 正秀, aya; 1657–1723), Japanese poet and samurai
- Masahide Ōta (大田 昌秀; born 1925), Japanese academic and politician
