= 2004 Kawasaki Frontale season =

Kawasaki Frontale
2004 season
- Manager: Takashi Sekizuka
- Stadium: Todoroki Athletics Stadium
- J. League 2: 1st
- Emperor's Cup: 5th Round
- Top goalscorer: Juninho (37)
Home colours	Away colours

2004 Kawasaki Frontale season. At the end of the season, the team finished first in the league and were promoted back to the J. League Division 1, where they remained ever since.

== Competitions ==
Competitions	Position
J. League 2	1st / 12 clubs
Emperor's Cup	5th Round

== Domestic results ==
=== J. League 2 ===
Match	Date	Venue	Opponents	Score
1	2004..	[[]]	[[]]	-
2	2004..	[[]]	[[]]	-
3	2004..	[[]]	[[]]	-
4	2004..	[[]]	[[]]	-
5	2004..	[[]]	[[]]	-
6	2004..	[[]]	[[]]	-
7	2004..	[[]]	[[]]	-
8	2004..	[[]]	[[]]	-
9	2004..	[[]]	[[]]	-
10	2004..	[[]]	[[]]	-
11	2004..	[[]]	[[]]	-
12	2004..	[[]]	[[]]	-
13	2004..	[[]]	[[]]	-
14	2004..	[[]]	[[]]	-
15	2004..	[[]]	[[]]	-
16	2004..	[[]]	[[]]	-
17	2004..	[[]]	[[]]	-
18	2004..	[[]]	[[]]	-
19	2004..	[[]]	[[]]	-
20	2004..	[[]]	[[]]	-
21	2004..	[[]]	[[]]	-
22	2004..	[[]]	[[]]	-
23	2004..	[[]]	[[]]	-
24	2004..	[[]]	[[]]	-
25	2004..	[[]]	[[]]	-
26	2004..	[[]]	[[]]	-
27	2004..	[[]]	[[]]	-
28	2004..	[[]]	[[]]	-
29	2004..	[[]]	[[]]	-
30	2004..	[[]]	[[]]	-
31	2004..	[[]]	[[]]	-
32	2004..	[[]]	[[]]	-
33	2004..	[[]]	[[]]	-
34	2004..	[[]]	[[]]	-
35	2004..	[[]]	[[]]	-
36	2004..	[[]]	[[]]	-
37	2004..	[[]]	[[]]	-
38	2004..	[[]]	[[]]	-
39	2004..	[[]]	[[]]	-
40	2004..	[[]]	[[]]	-
41	2004..	[[]]	[[]]	-
42	2004..	[[]]	[[]]	-
43	2004..	[[]]	[[]]	-
44	2004..	[[]]	[[]]	-

=== Emperor's Cup ===
Match	Date	Venue	Opponents	Score
3rd Round	2004..	[[]]	[[]]	-
4th Round	2004..	[[]]	[[]]	-
5th Round	2004..	[[]]	[[]]	-

== Player statistics ==
No.	Pos.	Player	D.o.B. (Age)	Height / Weight	J. League 2		Emperor's Cup		Total	
No.	Pos.	Player	D.o.B. (Age)	Height / Weight	Apps	Goals	Apps	Goals	Apps	Goals
1	GK	Takeshi Urakami	February 7, 1969 (aged 35)	cm / kg	0	0				
2	DF	Hiroki Ito	July 27, 1978 (aged 25)	cm / kg	35	0				
3	DF	Hideki Sahara	May 15, 1978 (aged 25)	cm / kg	22	1				
4	MF	Augusto	November 5, 1968 (aged 35)	cm / kg	31	8				
5	DF	Yoshinobu Minowa	June 2, 1976 (aged 27)	cm / kg	36	1				
6	MF	Iwao Yamane	July 31, 1976 (aged 27)	cm / kg	5	0				
7	MF	Toru Oniki	April 20, 1974 (aged 29)	cm / kg	19	0				
8	MF	Tomoaki Kuno	September 25, 1973 (aged 30)	cm / kg	32	1				
9	FW	Kazuki Ganaha	September 26, 1980 (aged 23)	cm / kg	42	22				
10	FW	Juninho	September 15, 1977 (aged 26)	cm / kg	39	37				
11	MF	Marcus	February 25, 1974 (aged 30)	cm / kg	37	18				
13	DF	Shuhei Terada	June 23, 1975 (aged 28)	cm / kg	33	2				
14	MF	Kengo Nakamura	October 31, 1980 (aged 23)	cm / kg	41	5				
15	MF	Taketo Shiokawa	December 17, 1977 (aged 26)	cm / kg	2	0				
16	MF	Yuzuki Ito	April 7, 1974 (aged 29)	cm / kg	0	0				
17	GK	Shinya Yoshihara	April 19, 1978 (aged 25)	cm / kg	41	0				
18	MF	Akira Konno	September 12, 1974 (aged 29)	cm / kg	24	2				
19	FW	Tadamichi Machida	May 23, 1981 (aged 22)	cm / kg	16	2				
20	MF	Yasuhiro Nagahashi	August 2, 1975 (aged 28)	cm / kg	36	0				
21	GK	Seigo Shimokawa	November 17, 1975 (aged 28)	cm / kg	3	0				
22	DF	Makoto Kimura	June 10, 1979 (aged 24)	cm / kg	23	0				
23	DF	Naoki Soma	July 19, 1971 (aged 32)	cm / kg	15	0				
24	FW	Masaru Kurotsu	August 20, 1982 (aged 21)	cm / kg	14	3				
25	DF	Ryosuke Kanzaki	June 21, 1982 (aged 21)	cm / kg	0	0				
26	MF	Satoshi Hida	April 18, 1984 (aged 19)	cm / kg	6	1				
27	MF	Tetsuya Oishi	November 26, 1979 (aged 24)	cm / kg	0	0				
28	GK	Takashi Aizawa	January 5, 1982 (aged 22)	cm / kg	0	0				
29	MF	Hiroyuki Taniguchi	June 27, 1985 (aged 18)	cm / kg	11	1				
30	MF	Takumi Watanabe	March 15, 1982 (aged 21)	cm / kg	24	0				
31	MF	Takahisa Nishiyama	July 11, 1985 (aged 18)	cm / kg	0	0				
32	DF	Kazunari Okayama	April 24, 1978 (aged 25)	cm / kg	2	0				
33	FW	Takuro Yajima	March 28, 1984 (aged 19)	cm / kg	1	0				

== Other pages ==
- (in Japanese) J. League official site
