= Toru Oniki =

Japanese footballer

Toru Oniki 鬼木 達
- Toru Oniki as Kashima Antlers Manager in 2026

Personal information
- Full name: Toru Oniki
- Date of birth: 20 April 1974 (age 52)
- Place of birth: Funabashi, Chiba, Japan
- Height: 1.68 m (5 ft 6 in)
- Position: Midfielder

Team information
- Current team: Kashima Antlers (manager)

Youth career
- 1990–1992: Ichiritsu Funabashi High School

Senior career*
Years	Team	Apps	(Gls)
1993–1999	Kashima Antlers	38	(2)
1998	→ Kawasaki Frontale (loan)	33	(2)
2000–2006	Kawasaki Frontale	156	(1)
Total		227	(5)

Managerial career
- 2010–2017: Kawasaki Frontale (assistant)
- 2017–2024: Kawasaki Frontale
- 2025–: Kashima Antlers
Medal record
Kashima Antlers
Winner	J1 League	1996
Runner-up	J1 League	1993
Runner-up	J1 League	1997
Winner	J.League Cup	1997
Runner-up	J.League Cup	1999
Winner	Emperor's Cup	1997
Runner-up	Emperor's Cup	1993
Kawasaki Frontale
Runner-up	J1 League	2006
Runner-up	J.League Cup	2000
- * Club domestic league appearances and goals

Toru Oniki (鬼木 達, Oniki Tōru; born April 20, 1974) is a Japanese football manager and former player. He is the currently manager of J1 League club, Kashima Antlers.

Oniki’s immediate success further cemented his reputation as one of the greatest managers in the J1 League history, having delivered sustained success at Kawasaki Frontale and instant impact at Kashima Antlers in which he was also a former players at both club.

== Playing career ==
Oniki was born in Funabashi on 20 April 1974. After graduating from high school, he joined Kashima Antlers in 1993. He played as mainly defensive midfielder. However he could not become a regular player behind Jorginho and Yasuto Honda. In 1998, he moved to Japan Football League club Kawasaki Frontale on loan. He played as regular player and the club won the 2nd place. In 1999, although he returned to Antlers, he could not play many matches. In 2000, he moved to newly promoted J1 League club, Kawasaki Frontale again. In 2000, he played many matches and the club won the 2nd place 2000 J.League Cup. Although the club finished at bottom place in the league and was relegated to J2 League, he became a regular player from 2001 season. Although his opportunity to play decreased from 2003, the club won the champions in 2004 and was promoted to J1 League. He could hardly play in the match from 2005 and he retired end of 2006 season.

== Managerial career ==
=== Kawasaki Frontale ===
After retirement, Oniki began his coaching career serving as an assistant coach under Takashi Sekizuka with Kawasaki Frontale in 2007. He mostly spend his time becoming an assist to Yahiro Kazama until the end of the 2016 season. In January 2017, he was promoted to the club manager. In his debut season, he guided Frontale to their first-ever J1 League title in the 2017 season and also their first major honours, ending years of near misses. Under Oniki helms, Frontale established themselves as a dominant force in Japanese football. The club won back-to-back league titles defending their league title in the 2018 season. Later, he helped the club to add further more silverware in 2020 and 2021, becoming the first team to secure four J1 League titles within five seasons. During Oniki's tenure, the club would amass numerous titles, including four J1 League title, two Emperor's Cups, and one J.League Cup. His tenure saw Frontale win a total of 10 major trophies, making him the most successful manager in the club and league history.

=== Kashima Antlers ===
Oniki officially announced he would depart as manager due to his contract expiring at the end of 2024 season. He was subsequently announced as the new manager of his former club, the Kashima Antlers, starting from the 2025 season. In his first season, Oniki immediately led the team to the 2025 J1 League title, ending the club’s nine-year wait for a league title and also guiding the club back to the AFC Champions League Elite. His achievement marked Oniki’s fifth J1 League title as a manager and made him one of the few coaches to win the league with multiple clubs. His arrival was widely seen as a decisive factor in restoring Kashima’s dominance, combining his proven tactical approach with the club’s strong footballing tradition.

== Career statistics ==
=== Club ===
As of the end 2006 season.

Club performance			League		Cup		League Cup		Total	
Season	Club	League	Apps	Goals	Apps	Goals	Apps	Goals	Apps	Goals
Japan			League		Emperor's Cup		League Cup		Total	
1993	Kashima Antlers	J.League	0	0	0	0	0	0	0	0
1994	Kashima Antlers	J.League	0	0	0	0	0	0	0	0
1995	Kashima Antlers	J.League	4	0	0	0	—		4	0
1996	Kashima Antlers	J.League	11	0	2	0	3	1	16	1
1997	Kashima Antlers	J.League	5	0	0	0	3	0	8	0
1998	Kawasaki Frontale	Former JFL	27	1	3	1	3	0	33	2
1999	Kashima Antlers	J.League Div 1	7	1	0	0	3	0	10	1
2000	Kawasaki Frontale	J.League Div 1	21	1	0	0	7	0	28	1
2001	Kawasaki Frontale	J.League Div 2	40	0	5	0	3	0	48	0
2002	Kawasaki Frontale	J.League Div 2	39	0	5	0	—		44	0
2003	Kawasaki Frontale	J.League Div 2	13	0	2	0	—		15	0
2004	Kawasaki Frontale	J.League Div 2	19	0	0	0	—		19	0
2005	Kawasaki Frontale	J.League Div 1	1	0	0	0	0	0	1	0
2006	Kawasaki Frontale	J.League Div 1	0	0	0	0	1	0	1	0
Career total			187	3	17	1	23	1	227	5

== Managerial statistics ==
As of 6 June 2026

Team	From	To	Record				
Team	From	To	G	W	D	L	Win %
Kawasaki Frontale	1 February 2017	8 December 2024	393	216	98	79	54.96
Kashima Antlers	12 December 2024	present	64	41	12	11	64.06
Total			457	257	110	90	56.24

== Honours ==
=== As player ===
==== Kashima Antlers ====
- J1 League: 1996
- J.League Cup: 1997
- Japanese Super Cup: 1997, 1999

==== Kawasaki Frontale ====
- J2 League: 2004

=== As manager ===
==== Kawasaki Frontale ====
- J1 League: 2017, 2018, 2020, 2021
- Emperor's Cup: 2020, 2023
- J.League Cup: 2019
- Japanese Super Cup: 2019, 2021, 2024

==== Kashima Antlers ====
- J1 League: 2025

==== Individual ====
- J1 League Manager of the Month: February/March 2025,
