= Espeto =

Espeto may refer to:

- Espeto (food), a fish dish from Málaga and the Granada Coast in Southern Spain
- Gabriel Strefezza (born April 1997), nicknamed Espeto, Brazilian footballer
- Espeto (footballer, born November 1997), Brazilian footballer Genilson dos Santos Júnior
