= Mizuta =

Mizuta (written: 水田; lit. "water field") is a Japanese surname. Notable people with the surname include:

- Akio Mizuta (水田 章雄; born 1973), Japanese baseball player
- Mizuta Masahide (水田 正秀; 1657–1723), Japanese poet and samurai
- Mikio Mizuta (水田 三喜男; 1905–1976), Japanese jurist, educator and politician
- Naoshi Mizuta (水田 直志; born 1972), Japanese video game composer and musician
- Noriko Mizuta (水田 宗子; born 1937), Japanese academic and poet
- Wasabi Mizuta (水田 わさび; born 1974), Japanese voice actress
