= Shuhei Terada =

Japanese footballer

Shuhei Terada 寺田 周平
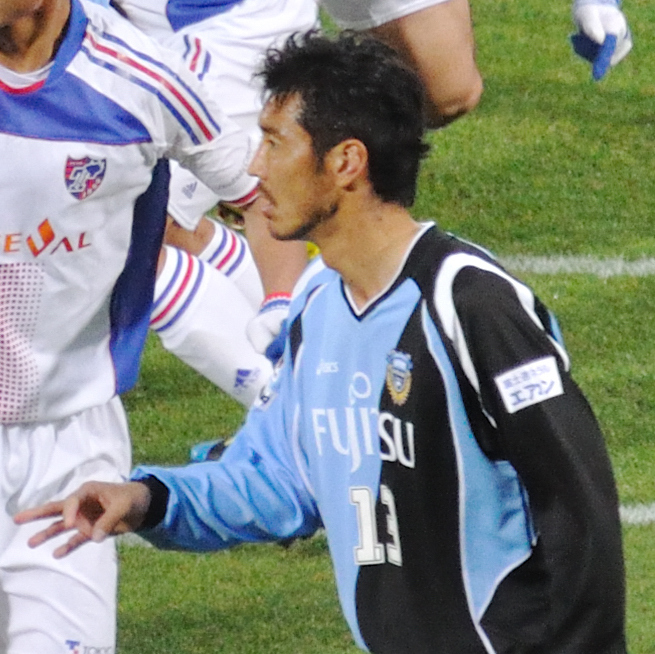

Personal information
- Full name: Shuhei Terada
- Date of birth: 23 June 1975 (age 51)
- Place of birth: Mie, Japan
- Height: 1.89 m (6 ft 2 1/2 in)
- Position: Defender

Team information
- Current team: Fukushima United (manager)

Youth career
- 1991–1993: Yokosuka High School

College career
Years	Team	Apps	(Gls)
1994–1997	Tokai University		

Senior career*
Years	Team	Apps	(Gls)
1999–2010	Kawasaki Frontale	191	(8)
Total		191	(8)

International career
2008–2009	Japan	6	(0)

Managerial career
- 2024–: Fukushima United
Medal record
Kawasaki Frontale
Runner-up	J1 League	2006
Runner-up	J1 League	2008
Runner-up	J1 League	2009
Runner-up	J.League Cup	2000
Runner-up	J.League Cup	2007
Runner-up	J.League Cup	2009
- * Club domestic league appearances and goals

Shuhei Terada (寺田 周平, Terada Shuhei; born June 23, 1975) is a Japanese football manager and former player who is the current manager of J3 League club, Fukushima United.

== Club career ==
Terada started playing football at the junior youth setup of Japan Soccer League side Nissan Motors (current Yokohama F. Marinos). Then he played for and was educated at Yokosuka High School and Tokai University. At the university, he contribute to the Japan team winning the 1995 Summer Universiade held in Fukuoka. After the graduation, he nearly signed with Yokohama Marinos but the club pulled out when a problem was found in his neck at the medical check.

After spending a year unattached, he signed with J2 League side Kawasaki Frontale in 1999 as an anchoring midfielder. He immediately became a regular starter and contributed to the club winning the J2 Championship. In May 2000, he damaged his knee ligament that, along with other injuries, sidelined him for two and half years.

He was converted to a central defender and established himself as a linchpin of the Kawasaki defence.

He retired from the game at the end of the 2010 season.

== International career ==
Terada earned his first international cap on May 27, 2008 in a friendly against Paraguay. Being 32 years and 339 days old, he became the fourth eldest to make a national team debut for Japan. He also played at 2010 World Cup qualification and 2011 Asian Cup qualification. He played 6 games for Japan until 2009.

== Managerial career ==
On 13 December 2023, Terada was announced as manager of J3 club Fukushima United from the 2024 season.

On 18 November 2024, Terada signed a one year contract extension with Fukushima United.

== Career statistics ==
=== Club ===
Club performance			League		Cup		League Cup		Continental		Total	
Season	Club	League	Apps	Goals	Apps	Goals	Apps	Goals	Apps	Goals	Apps	Goals
Japan			League		Emperor's Cup		J.League Cup		Asia		Total	
1999	Kawasaki Frontale	J.League Div 2	12	0	4	0	2	0	-		18	0
2000	Kawasaki Frontale	J.League Div 1	8	1	0	0	2	0	-		10	1
2001	Kawasaki Frontale	J.League Div 2	0	0	0	0	0	0	-		0	0
2002	Kawasaki Frontale	J.League Div 2	4	1	0	0	-		-		4	1
2003	Kawasaki Frontale	J.League Div 2	3	0	4	0	-		-		7	0
2004	Kawasaki Frontale	J.League Div 2	33	2	3	1	-		-		36	3
2005	Kawasaki Frontale	J.League Div 1	26	2	2	0	6	3	-		34	5
2006	Kawasaki Frontale	J.League Div 1	22	0	2	0	7	0	-		31	0
2007	Kawasaki Frontale	J.League Div 1	29	1	4	0	4	0	7	0	44	1
2008	Kawasaki Frontale	J.League Div 1	21	1	1	0	3	1	-		25	2
2009	Kawasaki Frontale	J.League Div 1	23	0	3	0	4	0	6	1	36	1
2010	Kawasaki Frontale	J.League Div 1	10	0	1	1	0	0	-		11	1
Career total			191	8	24	2	28	4	13	1	256	15

=== National team ===
Japan national team
Year	Apps	Goals
2008	4	0
2009	2	0
Total	6	0

=== Appearances in major competitions ===
Team	Competition	Category	Appearances		Goals	Team record
Team	Competition	Category	Start	Sub	Goals	Team record
Japan	2010 FIFA World Cup Qualification	Senior	1	0	0	
Japan	2011 AFC Asian Cup qualification	Senior	2	0	0	

== Managerial statistics ==
Team	From	To	Record				
Team	From	To	G	W	D	L	Win %
Fukushima United	2024	present	38	18	5	15	47.37
Total			38	18	5	15	47.37
