= Yoshinori Doi =

Japanese footballer

Yoshinori Doi 土居 義典
Personal information
- Full name: Yoshinori Doi
- Date of birth: April 2, 1972 (age 54)
- Place of birth: Naruto, Tokushima, Japan
- Height: 1.79 m (5 ft 10 1/2 in)
- Position: Defender

Youth career
- 1988–1990: Tokushima High School

College career
Years	Team	Apps	(Gls)
1991–1994	University of Tsukuba		

Senior career*
Years	Team	Apps	(Gls)
1995–1996	Otsuka Pharmaceutical	44	(0)
1997–2001	Kawasaki Frontale	67	(0)
2002	Otsuka Pharmaceutical	8	(0)
Total		119	(0)
Medal record
Kawasaki Frontale
Runner-up	J.League Cup	2000
- * Club domestic league appearances and goals

Yoshinori Doi (土居 義典, Doi Yoshinori; born April 2, 1972) is a former Japanese football player.

== Playing career ==
Doi was born in Naruto on April 2, 1972. After graduating from University of Tsukuba, he joined Japan Football League (JFL) club Otsuka Pharmaceutical in 1995, which was based in his local area. In 1997, he moved to JFL club Kawasaki Frontale. He played many matches as a defensive midfielder and the club was promoted to new league J2 League in 1999. In 2000, the club were promoted as champions, but Doi could not play many matches and in the J1 League, and the club was relegated to J2. In 2002, he returned to Otsuka Pharmaceutical, retiring at the end of the season.

== Career statistics ==
Appearances and goals by club, season and competition
Club	Season	League			Emperor's Cup		J.League Cup		Total	
Club	Season	Division	Apps	Goals	Apps	Goals	Apps	Goals	Apps	Goals
Otsuka Pharmaceutical	1995	Football League	23	0	1	0	—		24	0
Otsuka Pharmaceutical	1996	Football League	21	0	4	0	—		25	0
Kawasaki Frontale	1997	Football League	13	0	2	0	—		15	0
Kawasaki Frontale	1998	Football League	18	0	0	0	3	0	21	0
Kawasaki Frontale	1999	J2 League	25	0	4	0	1	0	30	0
Kawasaki Frontale	2000	J1 League	2	0	0	0	1	0	3	0
Kawasaki Frontale	2001	J2 League	9	0	6	0	3	0	18	0
Otsuka Pharmaceutical	2002	Football League	8	0	1	0	—		9	0
Career total			119	0	18	0	8	0	145	0
