= Genilson =

Genilson or Genílson is a Brazilian given name. Notable people with the name include:

- Genilson da Rocha Santos (born 1971), Brazilian football defender
- Genílson Alves (born 1974), Brazilian football forward
- Genílson Ventura Mendes de Oliveira (born 1990), Brazilian football centre-back
- Genilson dos Santos Júnior (born 1997), Brazilian football defender commonly known as Espeto
