= Tomoaki Kuno =

Japanese footballer

Tomoaki Kuno 久野 智昭
Personal information
- Full name: Tomoaki Kuno
- Date of birth: September 25, 1973 (age 53)
- Place of birth: Shizuoka, Shizuoka, Japan
- Height: 1.70 m (5 ft 7 in)
- Position: Midfielder

Youth career
- 1989–1991: Shizuoka High School
- 1992–1995: Tokyo University of Agriculture

Senior career*
Years	Team	Apps	(Gls)
1996–2005	Kawasaki Frontale	232	(15)
Total		232	(15)
Medal record
Kawasaki Frontale
Runner-up	J.League Cup	2000
- * Club domestic league appearances and goals

Tomoaki Kuno (久野 智昭, Kuno Tomoaki; born September 25, 1973) is a former Japanese football player.

== Playing career ==
Kuno was born in Shizuoka on September 25, 1973. After graduating from Tokyo University of Agriculture, he joined Japan Football League club Fujitsu (later Kawasaki Frontale) in 1996. He became a regular player as a left side midfielder in 1998 and the club was promoted to the new J2 League in 1999. The club won the championship that year and was promoted to the J1 League in 2000. The club won second place in the J.League Cup that year. However the club results were poor in league competition and it was relegated to the J2 league. In 2002, he did not play left side midfielder as often as defensive midfielder. In 2004, he played as a regular defensive midfielder. The club won the championship and was promoted to J1 in 2005. However he did not play as much in 2005 and he retired at the end of the season.

== Career statistics ==
Appearances and goals by club, season and competition
Club	Season	League			Emperor's Cup		J.League Cup		Total	
Club	Season	Division	Apps	Goals	Apps	Goals	Apps	Goals	Apps	Goals
Fujitsu	1996	Football League	7	0	4	0	—		11	0
Kawasaki Frontale	1997	Football League	3	0	0	0	—		3	0
Kawasaki Frontale	1998	Football League	28	3	3	0	4	0	35	3
Kawasaki Frontale	1999	J2 League	35	8	4	0	2	0	41	8
Kawasaki Frontale	2000	J1 League	28	1	1	0	8	1	37	2
Kawasaki Frontale	2001	J2 League	42	1	5	2	4	0	51	3
Kawasaki Frontale	2002	J2 League	24	1	0	0	—		24	1
Kawasaki Frontale	2003	J2 League	16	0	0	0	—		16	0
Kawasaki Frontale	2004	J2 League	32	1	3	1	—		35	2
Kawasaki Frontale	2005	J1 League	17	0	1	0	2	0	20	0
Career total			232	15	21	1	20	1	273	17
