= 2000 Kawasaki Frontale season =

Kawasaki Frontale
2000 season
- Manager: Zeca; Toshiaki Imai; Hiroshi Kobayashi
- Stadium: Todoroki Athletics Stadium
- J.League 1: 16th
- Emperor's Cup: 3rd Round
- J.League Cup: Runners-up
- Top goalscorer: Akira Konno (3)
Home colours	Away colours

2000 Kawasaki Frontale season

== Competitions ==
Competitions	Position
J.League 1	16th / 16 clubs
Emperor's Cup	3rd Round
J.League Cup	Runners-up

== Domestic results ==
=== J.League 1 ===
11 March 2000 1–1	Avispa Fukuoka	2–1	Kawasaki Frontale	Hakatanomori Football Stadium
JST (UTC+09)

18 March 2000 1–2	Kawasaki Frontale	0–1	Kashima Antlers	Todoroki Athletics Stadium
JST (UTC+09)

25 March 2000 1–3	Kawasaki Frontale	0–1	Sanfrecce Hiroshima	Todoroki Athletics Stadium
JST (UTC+09)

1 April 2000 1–4	Vissel Kobe	0–1	Kawasaki Frontale	Kobe Universiade Memorial Stadium
JST (UTC+09)

5 April 2000 1–5	Kawasaki Frontale	2–2 (GG) (a.e.t.)	Gamba Osaka	Todoroki Athletics Stadium
JST (UTC+09)

8 April 2000 1–6	JEF United Ichihara	1–0	Kawasaki Frontale	Ichihara Seaside Stadium
JST (UTC+09)

15 April 2000 1–7	Kawasaki Frontale	2–1	Kyoto Purple Sanga	Todoroki Athletics Stadium
JST (UTC+09)

22 April 2000 1–8	Verdy Kawasaki	2–0	Kawasaki Frontale	Todoroki Athletics Stadium
JST (UTC+09)

29 April 2000 1–9	Kawasaki Frontale	0–2	Shimizu S-Pulse	Todoroki Athletics Stadium
JST (UTC+09)

3 May 2000 1–10	Kawasaki Frontale	1–5	Júbilo Iwata	Todoroki Athletics Stadium
JST (UTC+09)

6 May 2000 1–11	F.C. Tokyo	2–1	Kawasaki Frontale	Komazawa Olympic Park Stadium
JST (UTC+09)

13 May 2000 1–12	Kawasaki Frontale	1–1 (GG) (a.e.t.)	Nagoya Grampus Eight	Todoroki Athletics Stadium
JST (UTC+09)

17 May 2000 1–13	Yokohama F. Marinos	4–1	Kawasaki Frontale	International Stadium Yokohama
JST (UTC+09)

20 May 2000 1–14	Kawasaki Frontale	2–4	Kashiwa Reysol	Todoroki Athletics Stadium
JST (UTC+09)

27 May 2000 1–15	Cerezo Osaka	1–2 (GG) (a.e.t.)	Kawasaki Frontale	Osaka Nagai Stadium
JST (UTC+09)

24 June 2000 2–1	Kawasaki Frontale	0–1	Avispa Fukuoka	Todoroki Athletics Stadium
JST (UTC+09)

1 July 2000 2–2	Kashima Antlers	4–0	Kawasaki Frontale	Kashima Soccer Stadium
JST (UTC+09)

8 July 2000 2–3	Kawasaki Frontale	0–3	F.C. Tokyo	Tokyo National Stadium
JST (UTC+09)

15 July 2000 2–4	Júbilo Iwata	3–1	Kawasaki Frontale	Júbilo Iwata Stadium
JST (UTC+09)

22 July 2000 2–5	Shimizu S-Pulse	2–2 (GG) (a.e.t.)	Kawasaki Frontale	Nihondaira Sports Stadium
JST (UTC+09)

26 July 2000 2–6	Kawasaki Frontale	0–0 (GG) (a.e.t.)	Verdy Kawasaki	Todoroki Athletics Stadium
JST (UTC+09)

29 July 2000 2–7	Kyoto Purple Sanga	3–1	Kawasaki Frontale	Nishikyogoku Athletic Stadium
JST (UTC+09)

5 August 2000 2–8	Kawasaki Frontale	2–1	Vissel Kobe	Todoroki Athletics Stadium
JST (UTC+09)

12 August 2000 2–9	Sanfrecce Hiroshima	0–1 (GG) (a.e.t.)	Kawasaki Frontale	Hiroshima Big Arch
JST (UTC+09)

19 August 2000 2–10	Kawasaki Frontale	0–1	JEF United Ichihara	Todoroki Athletics Stadium
JST (UTC+09)

8 November 2000 2–11	Gamba Osaka	4–0	Kawasaki Frontale	Osaka Expo '70 Stadium
JST (UTC+09)

11 November 2000 2–12	Kawasaki Frontale	4–3 (GG) (a.e.t.)	Cerezo Osaka	Todoroki Athletics Stadium
JST (UTC+09)

18 November 2000 2–13	Kashiwa Reysol	1–0	Kawasaki Frontale	Hitachi Kashiwa Soccer Stadium
JST (UTC+09)

23 November 2000 2–14	Kawasaki Frontale	1–0 (GG) (a.e.t.)	Yokohama F. Marinos	Todoroki Athletics Stadium
JST (UTC+09)

26 November 2000 2–15	Nagoya Grampus Eight	1–0	Kawasaki Frontale	Mizuho Athletic Stadium
JST (UTC+09)

=== Emperor's Cup ===
1st Round	bye

2nd Round	bye

10 December 2000 3rd Round	Kawasaki Frontale	0–2	Urawa Red Diamonds	Todoroki Athletics Stadium
JST (UTC+09)

=== J.League Cup ===
12 April 2000 1st Round-1	Kawasaki Frontale	3–0	Urawa Red Diamonds	Todoroki Athletics Stadium
JST (UTC+09)

19 April 2000 1st Round-2	Urawa Red Diamonds	2–1 (2–4 agg.)	Kawasaki Frontale	Urawa Komaba Stadium
JST (UTC+09)

5 July 2000 2nd Round-1	Kawasaki Frontale	1–0	Kashiwa Reysol	Todoroki Athletics Stadium
JST (UTC+09)

12 July 2000 2nd Round-2	Kashiwa Reysol	1–1 (GG) (a.e.t.) (1–2 agg.)	Kawasaki Frontale	Hitachi Kashiwa Soccer Stadium
JST (UTC+09)

30 August 2000 Quarterfinals-1	Verdy Kawasaki	0–0	Kawasaki Frontale	Todoroki Athletics Stadium
JST (UTC+09)

6 September 2000 Quarterfinals-2	Kawasaki Frontale	2–0 (2–0 agg.)	Verdy Kawasaki	Todoroki Athletics Stadium
JST (UTC+09)

11 October 2000 Semifinals-1	Kyoto Purple Sanga	0–2	Kawasaki Frontale	Nishikyogoku Athletic Stadium
JST (UTC+09)

18 October 2000 Semifinals-2	Kawasaki Frontale	1–2 (GG) (a.e.t.) (3–2 agg.)	Kyoto Purple Sanga	Tokyo National Stadium
JST (UTC+09)

4 November 2000 Final	Kawasaki Frontale	0–2	Kashima Antlers	Tokyo National Stadium
JST (UTC+09)		J.League

== Player statistics ==
No.	Pos.	Nat.	Player	D.o.B. (Age)	Height / Weight	J.League 1		Emperor's Cup		J.League Cup		Total	
No.	Pos.	Nat.	Player	D.o.B. (Age)	Height / Weight	Apps	Goals	Apps	Goals	Apps	Goals	Apps	Goals
1	GK	(Japan)	Takeshi Urakami	February 7, 1969 (aged 31)	cm / kg	24	0						
2	MF	(Japan)	Eiji Takada	October 21, 1974 (aged 25)	cm / kg	1	0						
3	DF	(Japan)	Hideki Sahara	May 15, 1978 (aged 21)	cm / kg	5	0						
4	DF	(Japan)	Ryosuke Okuno	November 13, 1968 (aged 31)	cm / kg	25	0						
5	MF	(Brazil)	Pedrinho	September 6, 1976 (aged 23)	cm / kg	14	1						
5	DF	(Japan)	Yoshinobu Minowa	June 2, 1976 (aged 23)	cm / kg	1	0						
6	DF	(Japan)	Shuhei Terada	June 23, 1975 (aged 24)	cm / kg	8	1						
7	MF	(Japan)	Toru Oniki	April 20, 1974 (aged 25)	cm / kg	21	1						
8	FW	(Japan)	Takayuki Suzuki	June 5, 1976 (aged 23)	cm / kg	11	0						
9	FW	(Japan)	Yasuyuki Moriyama	May 1, 1969 (aged 30)	cm / kg	14	0						
10	FW	(Brazil)	Mazinho Oliveira	December 26, 1965 (aged 34)	cm / kg	8	1						
11	FW	(Japan)	Tatsuru Mukojima	January 9, 1966 (aged 34)	cm / kg	8	1						
12	MF	(Japan)	Hideki Katsura	March 6, 1970 (aged 30)	cm / kg	0	0						
13	FW	(Japan)	Naoki Urata	June 27, 1974 (aged 25)	cm / kg	13	2						
14	DF	(Japan)	Tetsuo Nakanishi	September 8, 1969 (aged 30)	cm / kg	5	0						
15	DF	(Japan)	Yoshinori Doi	April 2, 1972 (aged 27)	cm / kg	2	0						
16	MF	(Japan)	Shinji Otsuka	December 29, 1975 (aged 24)	cm / kg	17	0						
17	GK	(Japan)	Yoshimi Sasahara	April 2, 1974 (aged 25)	cm / kg	0	0						
18	MF	(Paraguay)	Guido Alvarenga	August 24, 1970 (aged 29)	cm / kg	13	1						
19	MF	(Japan)	Akira Ito	September 19, 1972 (aged 27)	cm / kg	13	2						
20	MF	(Japan)	Yasuhiro Nagahashi	August 2, 1975 (aged 24)	cm / kg	19	1						
21	GK	(Japan)	Shinkichi Kikuchi	April 12, 1967 (aged 32)	cm / kg	6	0						
22	DF	(Japan)	Yusuke Nakatani	September 22, 1978 (aged 21)	cm / kg	10	1						
23	MF	(Japan)	Tomoaki Kuno	September 25, 1973 (aged 26)	cm / kg	28	1						
24	MF	(Japan)	Taketo Shiokawa	December 17, 1977 (aged 22)	cm / kg	4	0						
25	MF	(Japan)	Tetsuya Oishi	November 26, 1979 (aged 20)	cm / kg	10	1						
26	DF	(Japan)	Shingo Itō	April 28, 1979 (aged 20)	cm / kg	0	0						
27	FW	(Japan)	Kazuki Ganaha	September 26, 1980 (aged 19)	cm / kg	18	2						
28	MF	(Japan)	Akira Konno	September 12, 1974 (aged 25)	cm / kg	20	3						
29	DF	(Japan)	Takumi Morikawa	July 11, 1977 (aged 22)	cm / kg	17	1						
30	MF	(Japan)	Takumi Watanabe	March 15, 1982 (aged 17)	cm / kg	0	0						
31	DF	(Japan)	Junji Nishizawa	May 10, 1974 (aged 25)	cm / kg	19	1						
32	MF	(Japan)	Nobuyasu Ikeda	May 18, 1970 (aged 29)	cm / kg	9	1						
33	GK	(Japan)	Takashi Aizawa	January 5, 1982 (aged 18)	cm / kg	0	0						
34	MF	(Japan)	Takeo Harada	October 2, 1971 (aged 28)	cm / kg	15	1						
35	FW	(Brazil)	Paulo Isidoro	October 30, 1973 (aged 26)	cm / kg	9	2						
36	MF	(Brazil)	Daniel Rossi	January 4, 1981 (aged 19)	cm / kg	8	1						
37	MF	(Brazil)	Ricardinho	November 26, 1975 (aged 24)	cm / kg	6	0						
38	FW	(Brazil)	Luiz	January 10, 1982 (aged 18)	cm / kg	2	0						
