= Takeshi Urakami =

Japanese footballer

Takeshi Urakami 浦上 壮史
Personal information
- Full name: Takeshi Urakami
- Date of birth: 7 February 1969 (age 57)
- Place of birth: Kunitachi, Tokyo, Japan
- Height: 1.83 m (6 ft 0 in)
- Position: Goalkeeper

Youth career
- Kokugakuin Kugayama High School

Senior career*
| Years | Team | Apps | (Gls) |
| 1988–1994 | Yokohama Marinos | 2 | (0) |
| 1995–1996 | Shimizu S-Pulse | 5 | (0) |
| 1997–2004 | Kawasaki Frontale | 175 | (0) |
| Total | | 182 | (0) |
Medal record
Yokohama Marinos
| Winner | Japan Soccer League | 1988/89 |
| Winner | Japan Soccer League | 1989/90 |
| Runner-up | Japan Soccer League | 1990/91 |
| Runner-up | Japan Soccer League | 1991/92 |
| Winner | JSL Cup | 1988 |
| Winner | JSL Cup | 1989 |
| Winner | JSL Cup | 1990 |
| Winner | Emperor's Cup | 1988 |
| Winner | Emperor's Cup | 1989 |
| Winner | Emperor's Cup | 1991 |
| Winner | Emperor's Cup | 1992 |
| Runner-up | Emperor's Cup | 1990 |
Shimizu S-Pulse
| Winner | J.League Cup | 1996 |
Kawasaki Frontale
| Runner-up | J.League Cup | 2000 |
- * Club domestic league appearances and goals

Takeshi Urakami (浦上 壮史, Urakami Takeshi; born 7 February 1969) is a former Japanese football player.

== Playing career ==
Urakami was born in Kunitachi on 7 February 1969. After graduating from high school, he joined Nissan Motors (later Yokohama Marinos) in 1988. Through reserve team, he joined top team in 1990. However he could hardly play in the match behind Japan national team player Shigetatsu Matsunaga. In 1995, he moved to Shimizu S-Pulse. However he could hardly play in the match behind Masanori Sanada. In 1997, he moved to Japan Football League club Kawasaki Frontale. He became a regular player and the club was promoted to J2 League in 1999 and J1 League in 2000. The club was relegated to J2 in 2001. He lost his regular position behind Shinya Yoshihara from 2003 and he retired end of 2004 season.

== Club statistics ==
| Club performance | | | League | | Cup | | League Cup | | Total | |
| Season | Club | League | Apps | Goals | Apps | Goals | Apps | Goals | Apps | Goals |
| Japan | | | League | | Emperor's Cup | | J.League Cup | | Total | |
|---|---|---|---|---|---|---|---|---|---|---|
| 1990/91 | Nissan Motors | JSL Division 1 | 0 | 0 | | | 0 | 0 | 0 | 0 |
| 1991/92 | Nissan Motors | JSL Division 1 | 0 | 0 | | | 0 | 0 | 0 | 0 |
| 1992 | Yokohama Marinos | J1 League | - | | 0 | 0 | 0 | 0 | 0 | 0 |
| 1993 | Yokohama Marinos | J1 League | 0 | 0 | 0 | 0 | 2 | 0 | 2 | 0 |
| 1994 | Yokohama Marinos | J1 League | 2 | 0 | 0 | 0 | 0 | 0 | 2 | 0 |
| 1995 | Shimizu S-Pulse | J1 League | 5 | 0 | 0 | 0 | - | | 5 | 0 |
| 1996 | Shimizu S-Pulse | J1 League | 0 | 0 | 0 | 0 | 0 | 0 | 0 | 0 |
| 1997 | Kawasaki Frontale | Football League | 30 | 0 | 3 | 0 | - | | 33 | 0 |
| 1998 | Kawasaki Frontale | Football League | 28 | 0 | 3 | 0 | 4 | 0 | 35 | 0 |
| 1999 | Kawasaki Frontale | J2 League | 35 | 0 | 4 | 0 | 2 | 0 | 41 | 0 |
| 2000 | Kawasaki Frontale | J1 League | 24 | 0 | 1 | 0 | 9 | 0 | 34 | 0 |
| 2001 | Kawasaki Frontale | J2 League | 16 | 0 | 4 | 0 | 2 | 0 | 22 | 0 |
| 2002 | Kawasaki Frontale | J2 League | 42 | 0 | 0 | 0 | - | | 42 | 0 |
| 2003 | Kawasaki Frontale | J2 League | 0 | 0 | 0 | 0 | - | | 0 | 0 |
| 2004 | Kawasaki Frontale | J2 League | 0 | 0 | 0 | 0 | - | | 0 | 0 |
| Total | | | 182 | 0 | 15 | 0 | 19 | 0 | 216 | 0 |
