= 1999 Kawasaki Frontale season =

Kawasaki Frontale
1999 season
- Manager: Beto; Ikuo Matsumoto
- Stadium: Todoroki Athletics Stadium
- J.League 2: 1st
- Emperor's Cup: 4th Round
- J.League Cup: 1st Round
- Top goalscorer: Tuto (17)
Home colours	Away colours

1999 Kawasaki Frontale season

== Competitions ==
Competitions	Position
J.League 2	1st / 10 clubs
Emperor's Cup	4th round
J.League Cup	1st round

== Domestic results ==
=== J.League 2 ===
14 March 1999 1	Kawasaki Frontale	0–1	Albirex Niigata	Todoroki Athletics Stadium
JST (UTC+09)

21 March 1999 2	Oita Trinita	1–0	Kawasaki Frontale	Oita Athletic Stadium
JST (UTC+09)

28 March 1999 3	Montedio Yamagata	2–1	Kawasaki Frontale	Tsuruoka Komakihara Stadium
JST (UTC+09)

4 April 1999 4	Kawasaki Frontale	2–2 (GG) (a.e.t.)	FC Tokyo	Todoroki Athletics Stadium
JST (UTC+09)

10 April 1999 5	Ventforet Kofu	1–2	Kawasaki Frontale	Kose Sports Park Stadium
JST (UTC+09)

18 April 1999 6	Kawasaki Frontale	2–0	Consadole Sapporo	Todoroki Athletics Stadium
JST (UTC+09)

25 April 1999 7	Omiya Ardija	0–2	Kawasaki Frontale	Omiya Football Stadium
JST (UTC+09)

29 April 1999 8	Kawasaki Frontale	2–4	Sagan Tosu	Todoroki Athletics Stadium
JST (UTC+09)

2 May 1999 9	Vegalta Sendai	0–2	Kawasaki Frontale	Sendai Stadium
JST (UTC+09)

5 May 1999 10	Kawasaki Frontale	2–1	Oita Trinita	Todoroki Athletics Stadium
JST (UTC+09)

9 May 1999 11	Kawasaki Frontale	4–0	Montedio Yamagata	Todoroki Athletics Stadium
JST (UTC+09)

16 May 1999 12	FC Tokyo	0–1	Kawasaki Frontale	Nishigaoka Soccer Stadium
JST (UTC+09)

23 May 1999 13	Kawasaki Frontale	3–1	Ventforet Kofu	Todoroki Athletics Stadium
JST (UTC+09)

29 May 1999 14	Consadole Sapporo	1–1 (GG) (a.e.t.)	Kawasaki Frontale	Sapporo Atsubetsu Park Stadium
JST (UTC+09)

27 June 1999 15	Kawasaki Frontale	2–1 (GG) (a.e.t.)	Omiya Ardija	Todoroki Athletics Stadium
JST (UTC+09)

4 July 1999 16	Sagan Tosu	2–4	Kawasaki Frontale	Tosu Stadium
JST (UTC+09)

11 July 1999 17	Kawasaki Frontale	5–1	Vegalta Sendai	Todoroki Athletics Stadium
JST (UTC+09)

15 July 1999 18	Albirex Niigata	0–2	Kawasaki Frontale	Niigata City Athletic Stadium
JST (UTC+09)

30 July 1999 19	Kawasaki Frontale	2–1 (GG) (a.e.t.)	Omiya Ardija	International Stadium Yokohama
JST (UTC+09)

7 August 1999 20	Vegalta Sendai	0–3	Kawasaki Frontale	Sendai Stadium
JST (UTC+09)

15 August 1999 21	Kawasaki Frontale	0–1	Albirex Niigata	Todoroki Athletics Stadium
JST (UTC+09)

21 August 1999 22	Oita Trinita	0–1	Kawasaki Frontale	Oita Athletic Stadium
JST (UTC+09)

29 August 1999 23	Kawasaki Frontale	1–0	Montedio Yamagata	Todoroki Athletics Stadium
JST (UTC+09)

5 September 1999 24	FC Tokyo	0–0 (GG) (a.e.t.)	Kawasaki Frontale	Nishigaoka Soccer Stadium
JST (UTC+09)

10 September 1999 25	Kawasaki Frontale	2–0	Consadole Sapporo	Todoroki Athletics Stadium
JST (UTC+09)

15 September 1999 26	Sagan Tosu	2–1	Kawasaki Frontale	Tosu Stadium
JST (UTC+09)

19 September 1999 27	Ventforet Kofu	1–2	Kawasaki Frontale	Nirasaki Central Park Stadium
JST (UTC+09)

26 September 1999 28	Kawasaki Frontale	3–1	Vegalta Sendai	Todoroki Athletics Stadium
JST (UTC+09)

2 October 1999 29	Albirex Niigata	1–4	Kawasaki Frontale	Niigata City Athletic Stadium
JST (UTC+09)

11 October 1999 30	Kawasaki Frontale	0–3	Oita Trinita	Nagano Athletic Stadium
JST (UTC+09)

17 October 1999 31	Montedio Yamagata	0–2	Kawasaki Frontale	Yamagata City Athletic Stadium
JST (UTC+09)

24 October 1999 32	Kawasaki Frontale	3–2	FC Tokyo	Todoroki Athletics Stadium
JST (UTC+09)

31 October 1999 33	Consadole Sapporo	1–2 (GG) (a.e.t.)	Kawasaki Frontale	Sapporo Atsubetsu Park Stadium
JST (UTC+09)

5 November 1999 34	Kawasaki Frontale	2–1 (GG) (a.e.t.)	Sagan Tosu	Todoroki Athletics Stadium
JST (UTC+09)

14 November 1999 35	Kawasaki Frontale	3–0	Ventforet Kofu	Todoroki Athletics Stadium
JST (UTC+09)

21 November 1999 36	Omiya Ardija	2–1 (GG) (a.e.t.)	Kawasaki Frontale	Omiya Football Stadium
JST (UTC+09)

=== Emperor's Cup ===
28 November 1999 1st Round	Ehime FC	0–3	Kawasaki Frontale	Ehime Matsuyama Athletic Stadium
JST (UTC+09)

5 December 1999 2nd Round	Kawasaki Frontale	5–1	Josai University	Todoroki Athletics Stadium
JST (UTC+09)

12 December 1999 3rd Round	JEF United Ichihara	2–3	Kawasaki Frontale	Ichihara Seaside Stadium
JST (UTC+09)

19 December 1999 4th Round	Kawasaki Frontale	1–3	Verdy Kawasaki	Kagawa Marugame Stadium
JST (UTC+09)

=== J.League Cup ===
7 April 1999 1st Round-1	Kawasaki Frontale	1–3	Gamba Osaka	Todoroki Athletics Stadium
JST (UTC+09)

14 April 1999 1st Round-2	Gamba Osaka	0–1 (3–2 agg.)	Kawasaki Frontale	Osaka Expo '70 Stadium
JST (UTC+09)

== Player statistics ==
No.	Pos.	Nat.	Player	D.o.B. (Age)	Height / Weight	J.League 2		Emperor's Cup		J.League Cup		Total	
No.	Pos.	Nat.	Player	D.o.B. (Age)	Height / Weight	Apps	Goals	Apps	Goals	Apps	Goals	Apps	Goals
1	GK	(Japan)	Takeshi Urakami	February 7, 1969 (aged 30)	cm / kg	35	0						
2	MF	(Japan)	Eiji Takada	October 21, 1974 (aged 24)	cm / kg	28	7						
3	DF	(Japan)	Hideki Sahara	May 15, 1978 (aged 20)	cm / kg	28	1						
4	DF	(Japan)	Tamotsu Komatsuzaki	July 10, 1970 (aged 28)	cm / kg	1	0						
5	DF	(Brazil)	Genilson	December 1, 1971 (aged 27)	cm / kg	3	0						
6	DF	(Japan)	Shuhei Terada	June 23, 1975 (aged 23)	cm / kg	12	0						
7	FW	(Japan)	Kenichi Sugano	August 8, 1971 (aged 27)	cm / kg	2	0						
8	MF	(Japan)	Yuzuki Ito	April 7, 1974 (aged 24)	cm / kg	2	0						
9	FW	(Brazil)	Tuto	July 2, 1978 (aged 20)	cm / kg	30	17						
10	MF	(Brazil)	Tinga	January 13, 1978 (aged 21)	cm / kg	24	8						
11	FW	(Japan)	Tatsuru Mukojima	January 9, 1966 (aged 33)	cm / kg	16	0						
12	MF	(Japan)	Hideki Katsura	March 6, 1970 (aged 29)	cm / kg	27	3						
13	FW	(Japan)	Naoki Urata	June 27, 1974 (aged 24)	cm / kg	28	6						
14	DF	(Japan)	Tetsuo Nakanishi	September 8, 1969 (aged 29)	cm / kg	31	0						
15	DF	(Japan)	Yoshinori Doi	April 2, 1972 (aged 26)	cm / kg	25	0						
16	MF	(Japan)	Shinji Otsuka	December 29, 1975 (aged 23)	cm / kg	32	0						
17	GK	(Japan)	Yoshimi Sasahara	April 2, 1974 (aged 24)	cm / kg	2	0						
18	DF	(Japan)	Masahide Kawamoto	June 21, 1971 (aged 27)	cm / kg	8	0						
19	MF	(Japan)	Akira Ito	September 19, 1972 (aged 26)	cm / kg	31	7						
20	MF	(Japan)	Yasuhiro Nagahashi	August 2, 1975 (aged 23)	cm / kg	31	0						
21	GK	(Japan)	Akinori Sakai	October 6, 1970 (aged 28)	cm / kg	0	0						
22	MF	(Japan)	Hiroshi Eda	April 15, 1977 (aged 21)	cm / kg	0	0						
23	MF	(Japan)	Tomoaki Kuno	September 25, 1973 (aged 25)	cm / kg	35	8						
24	FW	(Japan)	Takashi Uemura	December 2, 1973 (aged 25)	cm / kg	8	2						
25	MF	(Japan)	Tetsuya Oishi	November 26, 1979 (aged 19)	cm / kg	5	0						
26	DF	(Japan)	Shingo Itō	April 28, 1979 (aged 19)	cm / kg	4	0						
27	FW	(Japan)	Kazuki Ganaha	September 26, 1980 (aged 18)	cm / kg	3	0						
28	MF	(Japan)	Teruo Iwamoto	May 2, 1972 (aged 26)	cm / kg	12	5						
29	DF	(Japan)	Takumi Morikawa	July 11, 1977 (aged 21)	cm / kg	26	2						
30	MF	(Brazil)	Cadu	January 1, 1974 (aged 25)	cm / kg	4	1						

== Other pages ==
- (in Japanese) J.League official site
