= Juninho (footballer, born 1977) =

Brazilian footballer

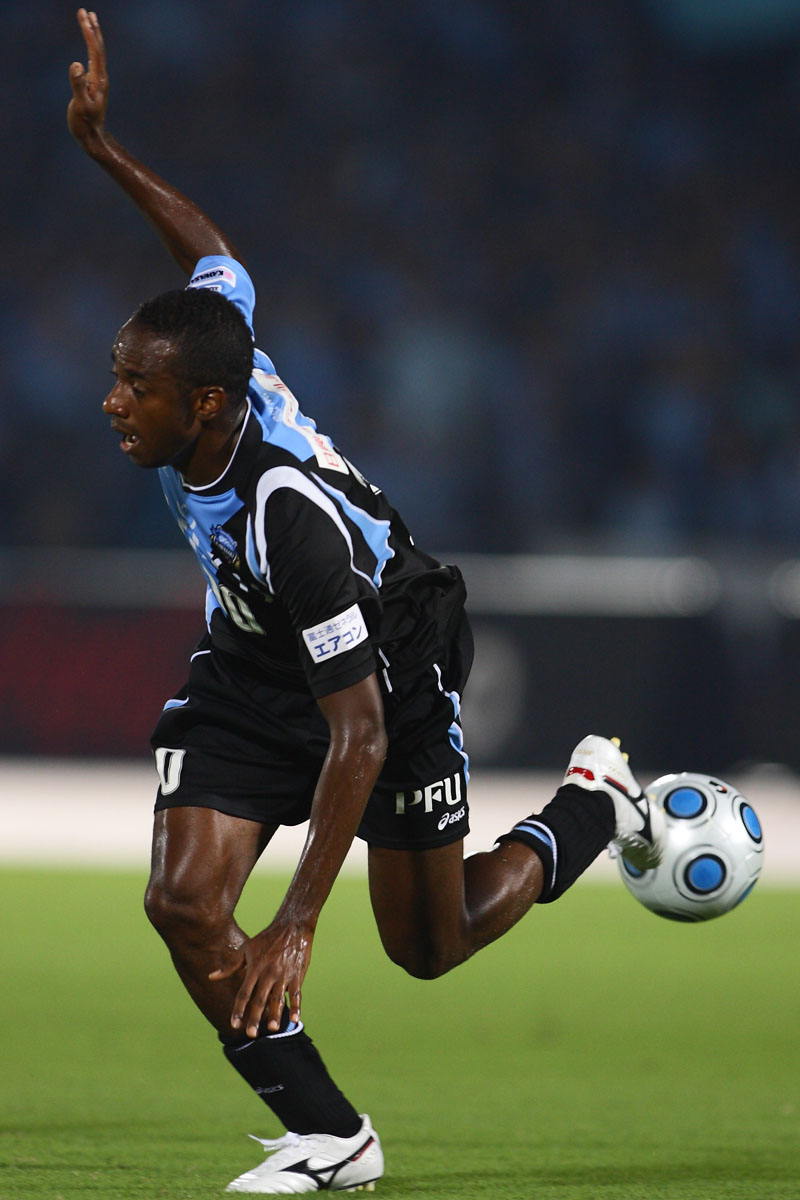

Personal information
- Full name: Carlos Alberto Carvalho dos Anjos Junior
- Date of birth: September 15, 1977 (age 49)
- Place of birth: Salvador, Brazil
- Height: 1.74 m (5 ft 9 in)
- Position: Striker

Senior career*
Years	Team	Apps	(Gls)
1996–1998	Bahia		
1999	Vila Nova		
2000	União São João		
2000–2002	Palmeiras	55	(6)
2003	→ Kawasaki Frontale (loan)	39	(28)
2004–2011	Kawasaki Frontale	246	(147)
2012–2013	Kashima Antlers	57	(6)
2015–2017	Juazeirense	26	(5)

International career
1996	Brazil U-20	4	(?)
- * Club domestic league appearances and goals as of 12 March 2017

Carlos Alberto Carvalho dos Anjos Junior "Juninho" (born September 15, 1977) is a Brazilian former professional footballer who played as a striker.

A legend of Kawasaki Frontale, Juninho was top scorer in the J2 League in 2004, and top scorer in the J1 League in 2007, leading him to be named in the 2007 J.League Team of the Year. He scored over 100 goals for the club during an 8-year stay, and later joined Kashima Antlers before retiring at Juazeirense.

== Career ==
Juninho started his career with Bahia, before joining Vila Nova, União São João and Palmeiras.

On 5 December 2003, after previously spending the loan on loan with Kawasaki Frontale, Juninho joined the club on a permanent transfer. He scored 37 goals in 39 games as Kawasaki Frontale were promoted to the J1 League, as he won the top scorer award. During the 2007 season, he was the top scorer, with 22 goals in 31 league appearances. This led to him being named in the 2007 J.League Team of the Year. In 2008, he said his intention was to stay in Japan for the rest of his life and become a naturalized Japanese citizen. However, he gave up on obtaining Japanese nationality due to concerns with him playing 4 international matches for Brazil U20's team, alongside a lack of documents from Brazil and Juninho not having proficiency in Japanese. On 25 November 2011, the club announced they would not be renewing his contract for the 2012 season.

On 27 December 2011, Juninho was announced at Kashima Antlers on a permanent transfer. He scored 6 goals in 57 league appearances during his time at the club before leaving at the end of the 2013 season.

== Club statistics ==
Club performance			League		Cup		League Cup		Continental		Total	
Season	Club	League	Apps	Goals	Apps	Goals	Apps	Goals	Apps	Goals	Apps	Goals
Japan			League		Emperor's Cup		J.League Cup		Asia		Total	
2003	Kawasaki Frontale	J2 League	39	28	0	0	-		-		39	28
2004	Kawasaki Frontale	J2 League	39	37	2	2	-		-		41	39
2005	Kawasaki Frontale	J1 League	31	16	1	2	6	4	-		38	22
2006	Kawasaki Frontale	J1 League	29	20	2	2	10	6	-		41	28
2007	Kawasaki Frontale	J1 League	31	22	4	2	5	4	7	3	47	31
2008	Kawasaki Frontale	J1 League	32	12	2	0	6	4	-		40	16
2009	Kawasaki Frontale	J1 League	33	17	1	1	5	3	9	4	48	24
2010	Kawasaki Frontale	J1 League	19	14	2	1	4	1	0	0	25	16
2011	Kawasaki Frontale	J1 League	32	9	1	0	3	1	-		36	10
2012	Kashima Antlers	J1 League	27	3	4	2	8	2	1	0	40	7
2013	Kashima Antlers	J1 League	30	3	1	0	5	1	1	0	37	4
Career total			342	181	20	12	52	24	18	7	432	223

== Honours ==
=== Individual ===
- J2 League Top Scorer: 2004
- J1 League Top Scorer: 2007
- J. League Best Eleven: 2007

=== Team ===
- J1 League Runners-up: 2006, 2008, 2009
- J.League Cup Runners-up: 2007, 2009
