= Genilson (footballer, born 1971) =

Brazilian footballer (born 1971)

Personal information
- Full name: Genilson da Rocha Santos
- Date of birth: 1 December 1971 (age 54)
- Place of birth: Euclides da Cunha, Brazil
- Height: 1.82 m (6 ft 0 in)
- Position: Midfielder

Team information
- Current team: Grêmio Novorizontino (president)

Senior career*
Years	Team	Apps	(Gls)
1992–1995	GE Novorizontino		
1995	Vasco da Gama	1	(0)
1996	GE Novorizontino		
1996	União Madeira	16	(3)
1997–1998	Bragantino		
1999	Kawasaki Frontale	3	(0)
2000	Mirassol	17	(0)
2001	Comercial-SP	22	(4)
2002	Araçatuba	5	(0)
2002–2003	Wuhan Guoce Bluestar		
- * Club domestic league appearances and goals

Genilson da Rocha Santos (born 1 December 1971), known as just Genilson, is a Brazilian retired footballer who played as a midfielder. He is the current president of Grêmio Novorizontino.

== Club statistics ==
Club performance			League		Cup		League Cup		Total	
Season	Club	League	Apps	Goals	Apps	Goals	Apps	Goals	Apps	Goals
Japan			League		Emperor's Cup		J.League Cup		Total	
1999	Kawasaki Frontale	J2 League	3	0			1	0	4	0
Total			3	0	0	0	1	0	4	0
