= Daniel Pitbull =

Brazilian footballer (born 1979)

Personal information
- Full name: Daniel Carlos Silva Anjos
- Date of birth: November 23, 1979 (age 46)
- Place of birth: Feira de Santana, Brazil
- Height: 1.78 m (5 ft 10 in)
- Position: Midfielder

Senior career*
Years	Team	Apps	(Gls)
2001	Kawasaki Frontale	5	(1)
2006	Grêmio Inhumense		
2006–2008	Estrela da Amadora		
2008	Pandurii Târgu Jiu		
- * Club domestic league appearances and goals

Daniel Carlos Silva Anjos (born 23 November 1979), sometimes known as Daniel Pitbull or just Daniel, is a Brazilian football player.

== Club statistics ==
Club performance			League		Cup		League Cup		Total	
Season	Club	League	Apps	Goals	Apps	Goals	Apps	Goals	Apps	Goals
Japan			League		Emperor's Cup		J.League Cup		Total	
2001	Kawasaki Frontale	J2 League	5	1	0	0	0	0	5	1
Total			5	1	0	0	0	0	5	1
