= Cadu (footballer, born 1974) =

Brazilian footballer

Personal information
- Full name: Ricardo Frederico Rodrigues Antunes
- Date of birth: 1 January 1974 (age 52)
- Place of birth: Rio de Janeiro, Brazil
- Height: 1.76 m (5 ft 9 1/2 in)
- Position: Midfielder

Team information
- Current team: Fluminense (assistant)

Youth career
- Fluminense

Senior career*
Years	Team	Apps	(Gls)
1994–1998	Fluminense	114	(1)
1999	Bahia		
1999	Kawasaki Frontale	4	(1)
2000	America-RJ		
2001	Madureira		
2004	Cabofriense		
2006	Volta Redonda	8	(1)
2007	Ceilândia		
2008	Bacabal		
2008–2009	Duque de Caxias	9	(0)

Managerial career
- 2014: Audax Rio
- 2021: Fluminense U23 (assistant)
- 2022: Fluminense U23
- 2023–: Fluminense (assistant)
- * Club domestic league appearances and goals

Ricardo Frederico Rodrigues Antunes (born 1 January 1974) is a Brazilian football coach and former player who played as a midfielder. He is the current assistant manager of Fluminense.

== Club statistics ==
Club performance			League		Cup		League Cup		Total	
Season	Club	League	Apps	Goals	Apps	Goals	Apps	Goals	Apps	Goals
Japan			League		Emperor's Cup		J.League Cup		Total	
1999	Kawasaki Frontale	J2 League	4	1			0	0	4	1
Total			4	1	0	0	0	0	4	1
