= Pedrinho (footballer, born 1976) =

Brazilian footballer

Personal information
- Full name: Jose Pedro Santos
- Date of birth: September 6, 1976 (age 50)
- Place of birth: Brazil
- Height: 1.73 m (5 ft 8 in)
- Position: Midfielder

Senior career*
Years	Team	Apps	(Gls)
2000	Kawasaki Frontale	14	(1)
- * Club domestic league appearances and goals

Jose Pedro Santos (born September 6, 1976), known as Pedrinho is a former Brazilian football player.

== Club statistics ==
Club performance			League		Cup		League Cup		Total	
Season	Club	League	Apps	Goals	Apps	Goals	Apps	Goals	Apps	Goals
Japan			League		Emperor's Cup		J.League Cup		Total	
2000	Kawasaki Frontale	J1 League	14	1	0	0	2	0	16	1
Total			14	1	0	0	2	0	16	1
