= 2001 Kawasaki Frontale season =

Kawasaki Frontale
2001 season
- Manager: Yoshiharu Horii; Nobuhiro Ishizaki
- Stadium: Todoroki Athletics Stadium
- J.League 2: 7th
- Emperor's Cup: Semifinals
- J.League Cup: Quarterfinals
- Top goalscorer: Emerson (19)
Home colours	Away colours

2001 Kawasaki Frontale season

== Competitions ==
Competitions	Position
J.League 2	7th / 12 clubs
Emperor's Cup	Semifinals
J.League Cup	Quarterfinals

== Domestic results ==
=== J.League 2 ===
10 March 2001 1	Kawasaki Frontale	3–1	Ventforet Kofu	Todoroki Athletics Stadium
JST (UTC+09)

17 March 2001 2	Sagan Tosu	0–1	Kawasaki Frontale	Tosu Stadium
JST (UTC+09)

24 March 2001 3	Kawasaki Frontale	2–4	Kyoto Purple Sanga	Todoroki Athletics Stadium
JST (UTC+09)

31 March 2001 4	Albirex Niigata	1–0	Kawasaki Frontale	Niigata City Athletic Stadium
JST (UTC+09)

8 April 2001 5	Kawasaki Frontale	1–0	Montedio Yamagata	Todoroki Athletics Stadium
JST (UTC+09)

14 April 2001 6	Kawasaki Frontale	1–2	Shonan Bellmare	Todoroki Athletics Stadium
JST (UTC+09)

22 April 2001 7	Vegalta Sendai	4–2	Kawasaki Frontale	Sendai Stadium
JST (UTC+09)

28 April 2001 8	Kawasaki Frontale	1–2	Oita Trinita	Todoroki Athletics Stadium
JST (UTC+09)

3 May 2001 9	Omiya Ardija	1–0	Kawasaki Frontale	Omiya Football Stadium
JST (UTC+09)

6 May 2001 10	Kawasaki Frontale	4–0	Mito HollyHock	Todoroki Athletics Stadium
JST (UTC+09)

12 May 2001 11	Yokohama FC	0–6	Kawasaki Frontale	International Stadium Yokohama
JST (UTC+09)

19 May 2001 12	Kawasaki Frontale	6–1	Sagan Tosu	Todoroki Athletics Stadium
JST (UTC+09)

23 May 2001 13	Kyoto Purple Sanga	4–0	Kawasaki Frontale	Nishikyogoku Athletic Stadium
JST (UTC+09)

26 May 2001 14	Shonan Bellmare	2–0	Kawasaki Frontale	Hiratsuka Athletics Stadium
JST (UTC+09)

17 June 2001 15	Kawasaki Frontale	1–1 (GG) (a.e.t.)	Vegalta Sendai	Todoroki Athletics Stadium
JST (UTC+09)

23 June 2001 16	Mito HollyHock	0–3	Kawasaki Frontale	Hitachinaka City Stadium
JST (UTC+09)

29 June 2001 17	Kawasaki Frontale	2–1	Yokohama FC	Todoroki Athletics Stadium
JST (UTC+09)

7 July 2001 18	Oita Trinita	2–1	Kawasaki Frontale	Ōita Stadium
JST (UTC+09)

11 July 2001 19	Kawasaki Frontale	2–3 (GG) (a.e.t.)	Omiya Ardija	Todoroki Athletics Stadium
JST (UTC+09)

14 July 2001 20	Ventforet Kofu	1–1 (GG) (a.e.t.)	Kawasaki Frontale	Kose Sports Park Stadium
JST (UTC+09)

21 July 2001 21	Kawasaki Frontale	2–3 (GG) (a.e.t.)	Albirex Niigata	Todoroki Athletics Stadium
JST (UTC+09)

25 July 2001 22	Montedio Yamagata	2–1 (GG) (a.e.t.)	Kawasaki Frontale	Yamagata Park Stadium
JST (UTC+09)

28 July 2001 23	Yokohama FC	1–3	Kawasaki Frontale	Yokohama Mitsuzawa Stadium
JST (UTC+09)

3 August 2001 24	Kawasaki Frontale	0–0 (GG) (a.e.t.)	Kyoto Purple Sanga	Todoroki Athletics Stadium
JST (UTC+09)

11 August 2001 25	Kawasaki Frontale	1–2	Oita Trinita	Todoroki Athletics Stadium
JST (UTC+09)

14 August 2001 26	Omiya Ardija	0–1	Kawasaki Frontale	Omiya Football Stadium
JST (UTC+09)

18 August 2001 27	Kawasaki Frontale	2–0	Shonan Bellmare	Todoroki Athletics Stadium
JST (UTC+09)

25 August 2001 28	Vegalta Sendai	1–2	Kawasaki Frontale	Sendai Stadium
JST (UTC+09)

1 September 2001 29	Albirex Niigata	2–0	Kawasaki Frontale	Niigata Stadium
JST (UTC+09)

5 September 2001 30	Kawasaki Frontale	0–2	Montedio Yamagata	Todoroki Athletics Stadium
JST (UTC+09)

10 September 2001 31	Kawasaki Frontale	2–1 (GG) (a.e.t.)	Mito HollyHock	Todoroki Athletics Stadium
JST (UTC+09)

15 September 2001 32	Sagan Tosu	0–1	Kawasaki Frontale	Tosu Stadium
JST (UTC+09)

19 September 2001 33	Kawasaki Frontale	1–2	Ventforet Kofu	Todoroki Athletics Stadium
JST (UTC+09)

22 September 2001 34	Oita Trinita	2–1	Kawasaki Frontale	Ōita Stadium
JST (UTC+09)

30 September 2001 35	Kawasaki Frontale	2–0	Vegalta Sendai	Todoroki Athletics Stadium
JST (UTC+09)

6 October 2001 36	Shonan Bellmare	2–1	Kawasaki Frontale	Hiratsuka Athletics Stadium
JST (UTC+09)

13 October 2001 37	Kawasaki Frontale	1–0	Omiya Ardija	Nagano Athletic Stadium
JST (UTC+09)

17 October 2001 38	Mito HollyHock	1–3	Kawasaki Frontale	Kasamatsu Stadium
JST (UTC+09)

20 October 2001 39	Kawasaki Frontale	2–1 (GG) (a.e.t.)	Yokohama FC	Edogawa Stadium
JST (UTC+09)

29 October 2001 40	Ventforet Kofu	3–0	Kawasaki Frontale	Kose Sports Park Stadium
JST (UTC+09)

3 November 2001 41	Kawasaki Frontale	2–0	Sagan Tosu	Nishigaoka Soccer Stadium
JST (UTC+09)

6 November 2001 42	Kyoto Purple Sanga	3–2 (GG) (a.e.t.)	Kawasaki Frontale	Nishikyogoku Athletic Stadium
JST (UTC+09)

10 November 2001 43	Kawasaki Frontale	1–2	Albirex Niigata	Machida Athletic Stadium
JST (UTC+09)

18 November 2001 44	Montedio Yamagata	0–1 (GG) (a.e.t.)	Kawasaki Frontale	Yamagata Park Stadium
JST (UTC+09)

=== Emperor's Cup ===
25 November 2001 1st Round	Kwansei Gakuin University	0–5	Kawasaki Frontale	Kakogawa Athletic Stadium
JST (UTC+09)

2 December 2001 2nd Round	Kawasaki Frontale	1–0	Hosei University	Tochigi Green Stadium
JST (UTC+09)

9 December 2001 3rd Round	Consadole Sapporo	2–3 (GG) (a.e.t.)	Kawasaki Frontale	Toyama Athletic Stadium
JST (UTC+09)

16 December 2001 4th Round	Yokohama FC	1–3	Kawasaki Frontale	Tokushima Naruto Stadium
JST (UTC+09)

24 December 2001 Quarterfinals	Tokyo Verdy 1969	0–3	Kawasaki Frontale	Tokyo Stadium
JST (UTC+09)

29 December 2001 Semifinals	Kawasaki Frontale	1–2	Shimizu S-Pulse	Kobe Wing Stadium
JST (UTC+09)

=== J.League Cup ===
bye

13 June 2001 2nd Round-1	Yokohama FC	0–1	Kawasaki Frontale	Yokohama Mitsuzawa Stadium
JST (UTC+09)

20 June 2001 2nd Round-2	Kawasaki Frontale	2–1 (3–1 agg.)	Yokohama FC	Todoroki Athletics Stadium
JST (UTC+09)

8 August 2001 Quarterfinals-1	Yokohama F. Marinos	3–0	Kawasaki Frontale	Yokohama Mitsuzawa Stadium
JST (UTC+09)

29 August 2001 Quarterfinals-2	Kawasaki Frontale	0–2 (0–5 agg.)	Yokohama F. Marinos	Todoroki Athletics Stadium
JST (UTC+09)

== Player statistics ==
No.	Pos.	Nat.	Player	D.o.B. (Age)	Height / Weight	J.League 2		Emperor's Cup		J.League Cup		Total	
No.	Pos.	Nat.	Player	D.o.B. (Age)	Height / Weight	Apps	Goals	Apps	Goals	Apps	Goals	Apps	Goals
1	GK	(Japan)	Takeshi Urakami	February 7, 1969 (aged 32)	cm / kg	16	0						
2	MF	(Japan)	Eiji Takada	October 21, 1974 (aged 26)	cm / kg	9	1						
3	DF	(Japan)	Hideki Sahara	May 15, 1978 (aged 22)	cm / kg	0	0						
4	MF	(Japan)	Tetsuya Asano	February 23, 1967 (aged 34)	cm / kg	8	0						
5	DF	(Japan)	Yoshinobu Minowa	June 2, 1976 (aged 24)	cm / kg	36	5						
6	DF	(Japan)	Shuhei Terada	June 23, 1975 (aged 25)	cm / kg	0	0						
7	MF	(Japan)	Toru Oniki	April 20, 1974 (aged 26)	cm / kg	40	0						
8	MF	(Brazil)	Daniel	November 23, 1979 (aged 21)	cm / kg	5	1						
8	MF	(Brazil)	Edmilson	February 23, 1974 (aged 27)	cm / kg	20	2						
9	FW	(Brazil)	Emerson	September 6, 1981 (aged 19)	cm / kg	18	19						
9	DF	(Japan)	Kohei Morita	July 13, 1976 (aged 24)	cm / kg	7	1						
10	MF	(Brazil)	Ricardinho	November 26, 1975 (aged 25)	cm / kg	14	3						
10	MF	(Brazil)	Aílton	February 27, 1980 (aged 21)	cm / kg	10	2						
11	FW	(Japan)	Tatsuru Mukojima	January 9, 1966 (aged 35)	cm / kg	11	1						
12	MF	(Japan)	Hideki Katsura	March 6, 1970 (aged 31)	cm / kg	1	0						
13	FW	(Japan)	Naoki Urata	June 27, 1974 (aged 26)	cm / kg	0	0						
14	MF	(Japan)	Tetsuya Oishi	November 26, 1979 (aged 21)	cm / kg	5	0						
15	DF	(Japan)	Yoshinori Doi	April 2, 1972 (aged 28)	cm / kg	9	0						
16	FW	(Japan)	Yoshinori Abe	September 10, 1972 (aged 28)	cm / kg	30	4						
17	FW	(Japan)	Kazuki Ganaha	September 26, 1980 (aged 20)	cm / kg	31	2						
18	MF	(Japan)	Akira Konno	September 12, 1974 (aged 26)	cm / kg	35	9						
19	MF	(Japan)	Akira Ito	September 19, 1972 (aged 28)	cm / kg	33	2						
20	MF	(Japan)	Yasuhiro Nagahashi	August 2, 1975 (aged 25)	cm / kg	15	0						
21	GK	(Japan)	Yoshimi Sasahara	April 2, 1974 (aged 26)	cm / kg	20	0						
22	FW	(Brazil)	Luiz	January 10, 1982 (aged 19)	cm / kg	1	0						
23	MF	(Japan)	Tomoaki Kuno	September 25, 1973 (aged 27)	cm / kg	42	1						
24	MF	(Japan)	Taketo Shiokawa	December 17, 1977 (aged 23)	cm / kg	28	3						
25	DF	(Japan)	Hiroki Ito	July 27, 1978 (aged 22)	cm / kg	43	1						
26	MF	(Japan)	Seiichi Tamaoki	April 26, 1982 (aged 18)	cm / kg	0	0						
27	FW	(Japan)	Masaru Kurotsu	August 20, 1982 (aged 18)	cm / kg	0	0						
28	GK	(Japan)	Takashi Aizawa	January 5, 1982 (aged 19)	cm / kg	9	0						
29	DF	(Japan)	Toru Ojima	February 22, 1976 (aged 25)	cm / kg	12	0						
30	MF	(Japan)	Takumi Watanabe	March 15, 1982 (aged 18)	cm / kg	14	1						
31	DF	(Japan)	Kazuhisa Iijima	January 6, 1970 (aged 31)	cm / kg	43	1						
32	DF	(Japan)	Ryosuke Kanzaki	June 21, 1982 (aged 18)	cm / kg	0	0						
33	FW	(Japan)	Kohei Hayashi	June 27, 1978 (aged 22)	cm / kg	39	9						
34	GK	(Japan)	Shinya Yoshihara	April 19, 1978 (aged 22)	cm / kg	0	0						

== Other pages ==
- (in Japanese) J.League official site
