= Masahide Kawamoto =

Japanese footballer

Masahide Kawamoto 川元 正英
Personal information
- Full name: Masahide Kawamoto
- Date of birth: June 21, 1971 (age 55)
- Place of birth: Kanagawa, Japan
- Height: 1.82 m (5 ft 11 1/2 in)
- Position: Defender

Youth career
- 1987–1989: Atsugi Minami High School
- 1990–1993: Tokai University

Senior career*
Years	Team	Apps	(Gls)
1994–1999	Kawasaki Frontale	68	(1)
Total		68	(1)
- * Club domestic league appearances and goals

Masahide Kawamoto (川元 正英, Kawamoto Masahide; born June 21, 1971) is a former Japanese football player.

== Playing career ==
Kawamoto was born in Kanagawa Prefecture on June 21, 1971. After graduating from Tokai University, he joined the Japan Football League club Fujitsu (later Kawasaki Frontale) in 1994. He became a regular player as center back from the first season. However, hr did not play as much in 1995. In 1998, he became a regular player again and the club won second place and was promoted to the new J2 League in 1999. The club won the championship for the 1999 season and was promoted to the J1 League for the 2000 season. However, he did not play as much in 1999 and he left the club at the end of the 1999 season without playing J1.

== Career statistics ==
Appearances and goals by club, season and competition
Club	Season	League			Emperor's Cup		J.League Cup		Total	
Club	Season	Division	Apps	Goals	Apps	Goals	Apps	Goals	Apps	Goals
Fujitsu	1994	Football League	21	1	—		—		21	1
Fujitsu	1995	Football League	2	0	0	0	—		2	0
Fujitsu	1996	Football League	13	0	3	1	—		16	1
Kawasaki Frontale	1997	Football League	0	0	0	0	—		0	0
Kawasaki Frontale	1998	Football League	24	0	3	0	4	0	31	0
Kawasaki Frontale	1999	J2 League	8	0	0	0	0	0	8	0
Career total			68	1	6	1	4	0	78	2
