= Espeto (food) =

Spanish dish

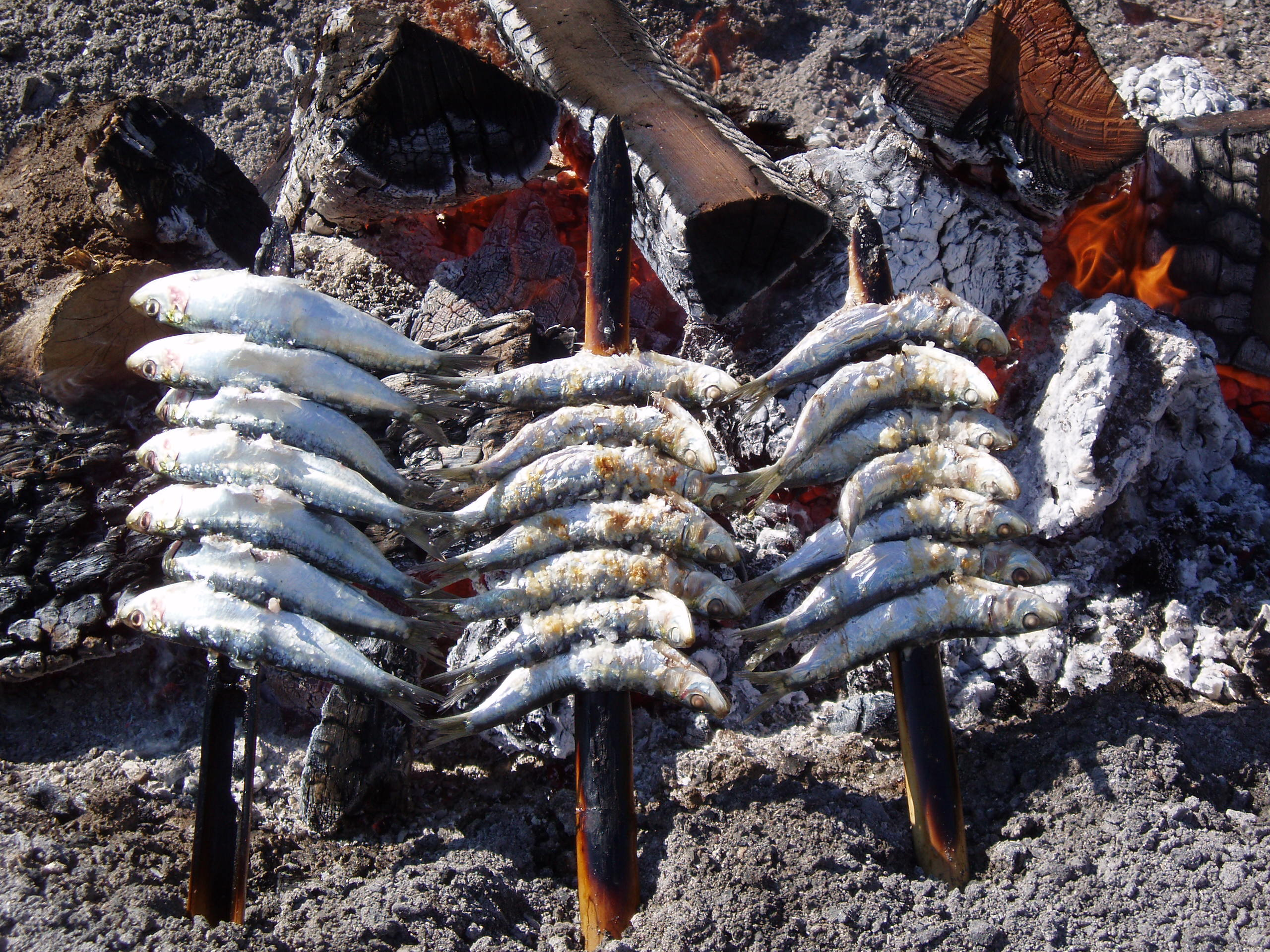
Typical Espeto of the Costa del Sol

The Espeto is a typical dish from Málaga and the Granada Coast in Southern Spain, and consists of skewering fish, traditionally sardines, on thin and long rods, to roast it over firewood on the beach sand.

== Technique ==
The technique consists of inserting the sardines through its back and taking care that they are all placed equally on the rod, above or below it. The concave part of the shank is turned upwards and the tip is inserted into the back of the sardine at the level of the dorsal fin, skirting the spine without breaking it and exiting through the belly. The row of sardines must be perpendicular to the rod. Salt is added and they are put next to an olive wood fire. The direction of the wind is always checked, which must go from the sardines to the flame to prevent them from scorching or smoking. The ideal distance is about 20-30 centimeters (7.8-11.8 inches) from the flame. The skewers are made in approximately 6 minutes. Traditionally, a small mound of sand was placed to nail the reeds and on the other side the wood already made on fire. When it became an activity where a professional skewer cooks for a restaurant, to avoid being crouched in the sand for hours, the skewers resorted to the ingenuity of placing sand inside a boat and raising it on trestles. At present there are many restaurants and even town halls that place boats, in some cases made of metal, along the promenades, so that they can be filled with sand and make work easier. The advantage of these modern containers is that they can be easily oriented with respect to the breeze.

Obviously, although the traditional thing is the sardine, many other foods can be spit. Thus, it is common to spit other fish such as horse mackerel, sea bream, sea bass, etc. In these cases, the cane is inserted through the animal's mouth. It is also common to see squid or other large mollusks. The embers of the skewer can be used, of course, to roast other foods such as meat or vegetable skewers or potatoes.

The rod on which the fish is skewered is made from sugarcane that is cut into pieces of about 50 centimeters and then split in half lengthwise. Once the two half rods are obtained, the tip is sharpened so that the fish can be inserted. These reeds are placed in a bucket with water so that they become moist and can be placed on top of the coals without burning.
