= 2003 Kawasaki Frontale season =

Kawasaki Frontale
2003 season
- Manager: Nobuhiro Ishizaki
- Stadium: Todoroki Athletics Stadium
- J. League 2: 3rd
- Emperor's Cup: 4th Round
- Top goalscorer: Juninho (28)
Home colours	Away colours

2003 Kawasaki Frontale season

== Competitions ==
Competitions	Position
J. League 2	3rd / 12 clubs
Emperor's Cup	4th Round

== Domestic results ==
=== J. League 2 ===
Match	Date	Venue	Opponents	Score
1	2003.3.15	Hiroshima Big Arch	Sanfrecce Hiroshima	2–2
2	2003.3.22	Todoroki Athletics Stadium	Shonan Bellmare	2–1
3	2003.3.29	Hakatanomori Athletic Stadium	Avispa Fukuoka	2–0
4	2003.4.5	Todoroki Athletics Stadium	Ventforet Kofu	1–1
5	2003.4.9	Todoroki Athletics Stadium	Montedio Yamagata	5–1
6	2003.4.13	Tosu Stadium	Sagan Tosu	0–0
7	2003.4.19	Todoroki Athletics Stadium	Mito HollyHock	2–2
8	2003.4.26	Niigata City Athletic Stadium	Albirex Niigata	0–1
9	2003.4.29	Todoroki Athletics Stadium	Omiya Ardija	1–1
10	2003.5.5	Sapporo Atsubetsu Park Stadium	Consadole Sapporo	0–0
11	2003.5.10	Todoroki Athletics Stadium	Yokohama F.C.	1–1
12	2003.5.14	Todoroki Athletics Stadium	Sanfrecce Hiroshima	1–0
13	2003.5.17	Hiratsuka Athletics Stadium	Shonan Bellmare	4–0
14	2003.5.24	Todoroki Athletics Stadium	Avispa Fukuoka	2–1
15	2003.5.31	Kose Sports Stadium	Ventforet Kofu	2–0
16	2003.6.6	Todoroki Athletics Stadium	Consadole Sapporo	1–0
17	2003.6.14	Mitsuzawa Stadium	Yokohama F.C.	4–0
18	2003.6.18	Todoroki Athletics Stadium	Albirex Niigata	0–4
19	2003.6.22	Kasamatsu Stadium	Mito HollyHock	1–0
20	2003.6.28	Todoroki Athletics Stadium	Sagan Tosu	6–3
21	2003.7.2	Yamagata Park Stadium	Montedio Yamagata	2–2
22	2003.7.6	Ōmiya Park Soccer Stadium	Omiya Ardija	0–1
23	2003.7.19	Todoroki Athletics Stadium	Yokohama F.C.	3–3
24	2003.7.26	Todoroki Athletics Stadium	Shonan Bellmare	2–1
25	2003.7.30	Hiroshima Stadium	Sanfrecce Hiroshima	1–1
26	2003.8.3	Todoroki Athletics Stadium	Ventforet Kofu	4–1
27	2003.8.10	Sapporo Dome	Consadole Sapporo	1–1
28	2003.8.17	Todoroki Athletics Stadium	Mito HollyHock	1–2
29	2003.8.23	Tosu Stadium	Sagan Tosu	2–0
30	2003.8.30	Todoroki Athletics Stadium	Montedio Yamagata	2–1
31	2003.9.3	Niigata City Athletic Stadium	Albirex Niigata	2–3
32	2003.9.6	Todoroki Athletics Stadium	Omiya Ardija	0–1
33	2003.9.13	Hakatanomori Athletic Stadium	Avispa Fukuoka	3–2
34	2003.9.20	Mito City Athletic Stadium	Mito HollyHock	1–0
35	2003.9.23	Todoroki Athletics Stadium	Sagan Tosu	7–1
36	2003.9.28	International Stadium Yokohama	Yokohama F.C.	5–2
37	2003.10.4	Todoroki Athletics Stadium	Albirex Niigata	3–0
38	2003.10.11	Saitama Stadium 2002	Omiya Ardija	2–0
39	2003.10.18	Todoroki Athletics Stadium	Consadole Sapporo	1–0
40	2003.10.25	Yamagata Park Stadium	Montedio Yamagata	0–0
41	2003.11.1	Kose Sports Stadium	Ventforet Kofu	0–2
42	2003.11.8	Todoroki Athletics Stadium	Avispa Fukuoka	5–2
43	2003.11.15	Hiratsuka Athletics Stadium	Shonan Bellmare	2–2
44	2003.11.23	Todoroki Athletics Stadium	Sanfrecce Hiroshima	2–1

=== Emperor's Cup ===
Match	Date	Venue	Opponents	Score
1st Round	2003..	[[]]	[[]]	-
2nd Round	2003..	[[]]	[[]]	-
3rd Round	2003..	[[]]	[[]]	-
4th Round	2003..	[[]]	[[]]	-

== Player statistics ==
No.	Pos.	Player	D.o.B. (Age)	Height / Weight	J. League 2		Emperor's Cup		Total	
No.	Pos.	Player	D.o.B. (Age)	Height / Weight	Apps	Goals	Apps	Goals	Apps	Goals
1	GK	Takeshi Urakami	February 7, 1969 (aged 34)	cm / kg	0	0				
2	DF	Hiroki Ito	July 27, 1978 (aged 24)	cm / kg	32	1				
3	DF	Hideki Sahara	May 15, 1978 (aged 24)	cm / kg	0	0				
4	MF	Augusto	November 5, 1968 (aged 34)	cm / kg	41	17				
5	DF	Yoshinobu Minowa	June 2, 1976 (aged 26)	cm / kg	41	1				
6	MF	Iwao Yamane	July 31, 1976 (aged 26)	cm / kg	39	1				
7	MF	Toru Oniki	April 20, 1974 (aged 28)	cm / kg	13	0				
8	MF	Tomoaki Kuno	September 25, 1973 (aged 29)	cm / kg	16	0				
9	FW	Jorge Dely Valdés	March 12, 1967 (aged 36)	cm / kg	18	3				
9	FW	Robert	February 27, 1981 (aged 22)	cm / kg	16	6				
10	FW	Juninho	September 15, 1977 (aged 25)	cm / kg	39	28				
11	MF	Yuzuki Ito	April 7, 1974 (aged 28)	cm / kg	10	0				
13	DF	Shuhei Terada	June 23, 1975 (aged 27)	cm / kg	3	0				
14	MF	Takehito Shigehara	October 6, 1981 (aged 21)	cm / kg	39	0				
15	MF	Taketo Shiokawa	December 17, 1977 (aged 25)	cm / kg	19	0				
16	FW	Kenji Kikawada	October 28, 1974 (aged 28)	cm / kg	5	0				
17	GK	Shinya Yoshihara	April 19, 1978 (aged 24)	cm / kg	44	0				
18	MF	Akira Konno	September 12, 1974 (aged 28)	cm / kg	41	7				
19	FW	Kohei Hayashi	June 27, 1978 (aged 24)	cm / kg	2	0				
20	MF	Yasuhiro Nagahashi	August 2, 1975 (aged 27)	cm / kg	35	2				
21	FW	Keiji Ishizuka	August 26, 1974 (aged 28)	cm / kg	0	0				
22	DF	Makoto Kimura	June 10, 1979 (aged 23)	cm / kg	1	0				
23	MF	Seiichi Tamaoki	April 26, 1982 (aged 20)	cm / kg	0	0				
24	FW	Masaru Kurotsu	August 20, 1982 (aged 20)	cm / kg	1	0				
25	DF	Ryosuke Kanzaki	June 21, 1982 (aged 20)	cm / kg	0	0				
26	MF	Kengo Nakamura	October 31, 1980 (aged 22)	cm / kg	34	4				
27	FW	Kazuki Ganaha	September 26, 1980 (aged 22)	cm / kg	40	13				
28	GK	Takashi Aizawa	January 5, 1982 (aged 21)	cm / kg	0	0				
29	DF	Ryoi Fujiki	September 8, 1983 (aged 19)	cm / kg	0	0				
30	MF	Takumi Watanabe	March 15, 1982 (aged 21)	cm / kg	40	0				
31	GK	Yohei Suzuki	October 14, 1983 (aged 19)	cm / kg	0	0				
32	DF	Kazunari Okayama	April 24, 1978 (aged 24)	cm / kg	34	2				
33	MF	Satoshi Hida	April 18, 1984 (aged 18)	cm / kg	0	0				
34	FW	Yasutaka Kobayashi	June 15, 1980 (aged 22)	cm / kg	10	1				

== Other pages ==
- (in Japanese) J. League official site
