= Hiroyuki Taniguchi =

Japanese footballer

Hiroyuki Taniguchi 谷口 博之
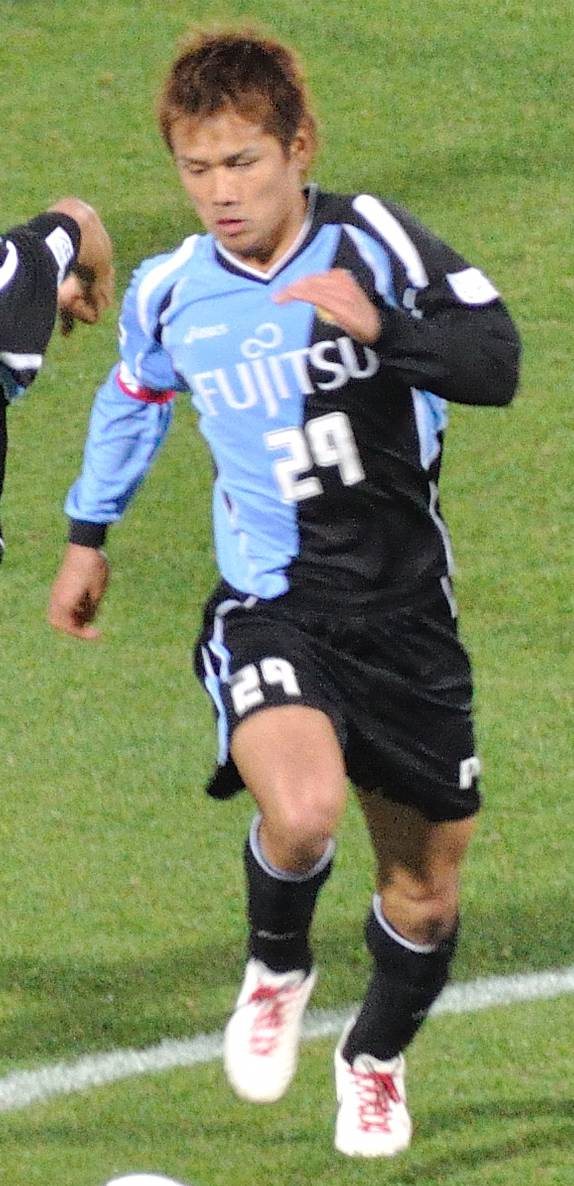

Personal information
- Full name: Hiroyuki Taniguchi
- Date of birth: 27 June 1985 (age 41)
- Place of birth: Yokosuka, Kanagawa, Japan
- Height: 1.82 m (5 ft 11 1/2 in)
- Position: Midfielder

Youth career
- 1998–2003: Yokohama F. Marinos

Senior career*
Years	Team	Apps	(Gls)
2004–2010	Kawasaki Frontale	190	(40)
2011–2012	Yokohama F. Marinos	58	(5)
2013	Kashiwa Reysol	8	(0)
2014–2019	Sagan Tosu	105	(8)
Total		361	(53)

International career
2008	Japan U-23	3	(0)
Medal record
Kawasaki Frontale
Runner-up	J1 League	2006
Runner-up	J1 League	2008
Runner-up	J1 League	2009
Runner-up	J.League Cup	2007
Runner-up	J.League Cup	2009
Kashiwa Reysol
Winner	J.League Cup	2013
- * Club domestic league appearances and goals as of end of 2019 season

Hiroyuki Taniguchi (谷口 博之, Taniguchi Hiroyuki; born 27 June 1985) is a Japanese former football player who last played for Sagan Tosu.

== Career ==
Taniguchi retired from football at the end of the 2019 season.

== National team career ==
In August 2008, Taniguchi was selected Japan U-23 national team for 2008 Summer Olympics. At this tournament, he played all 3 matches as offensive midfielder.

== Club statistics ==
Updated to 24 February 2020.

Club performance			League		Cup		League Cup		Continental		Total	
Season	Club	League	Apps	Goals	Apps	Goals	Apps	Goals	Apps	Goals	Apps	Goals
Japan			League		Emperor's Cup		J.League Cup		AFC		Total	
2004	Kawasaki Frontale	J2 League	11	1	2	0	—		—		13	1
2005	Kawasaki Frontale	J1 League	25	5	2	0	4	1	—		31	6
2006	Kawasaki Frontale	J1 League	33	13	1	0	8	0	—		42	13
2007	Kawasaki Frontale	J1 League	31	2	3	0	5	2	7	0	46	4
2008	Kawasaki Frontale	J1 League	31	10	2	1	4	0	—		37	11
2009	Kawasaki Frontale	J1 League	32	8	4	0	5	0	9	1	50	9
2010	Kawasaki Frontale	J1 League	27	1	3	0	3	0	6	2	40	3
2011	Yokohama F. Marinos	J1 League	33	2	3	1	5	2	—		41	5
2012	Yokohama F. Marinos	J1 League	25	3	2	0	3	0	—		30	3
2013	Kashiwa Reysol	J1 League	8	0	0	0	1	0	4	0	13	0
2014	Sagan Tosu	J1 League	28	2	1	1	4	1	—		33	4
2015	Sagan Tosu	J1 League	33	4	4	3	5	0	—		42	7
2016	Sagan Tosu	J1 League	33	2	3	0	5	0	—		41	2
2017	Sagan Tosu	J1 League	10	0	0	0	1	0	—		11	0
2018	Sagan Tosu	J1 League	0	0	0	0	0	0	—		0	0
2019	Sagan Tosu	J1 League	1	0	0	0	1	1	—		2	1
Career total			361	53	30	6	55	7	26	3	472	69

== National team career statistics ==
=== Appearances in major competitions ===
Year	Competition	Category	Appearances		Goals	Team record
Year	Competition	Category	Start	Sub	Goals	Team record
2007	2008 Olympics Qualification	U-22	0	1	0	Qualified
2008	2008 Summer Olympics	U-23	3	0	0	Round 1

== Honours ==
Kawasaki Frontale

- J2 League: 2004

Kashiwa Reysol

- J.League Cup: 2013

Individual

- J.League Best XI: 2006
- J.League Cup New Hero Award: 2006
