= Espeto (footballer, born November 1997) =

Brazilian footballer

Personal information
- Full name: Genilson dos Santos Júnior
- Date of birth: 12 November 1997 (age 29)
- Place of birth: Linhares, Brazil
- Position: Defender

Team information
- Current team: Ipojuca

Youth career
- –2014: Aracruz
- 2015: Linhares

Senior career*
| Years | Team | Apps | (Gls) |
| 2019 | Petrolina | 6 | (0) |
| 2019–2020 | Retrô | 7 | (0) |
| 2020– | Ipojuca | 3 | (0) |
- * Club domestic league appearances and goals as of 16:14, 17 November 2020 (UTC)

Genilson dos Santos Júnior (born 12 November 1997), commonly known as Espeto, is a Brazilian footballer who currently plays as a defender for Ipojuca.

== Career statistics ==
=== Club ===
As of 17 November 2020.

| Club | Season | League | | | State League | | Cup | | Other | | Total | |
| Club | Season | Division | Apps | Goals | Apps | Goals | Apps | Goals | Apps | Goals | Apps | Goals |
|---|---|---|---|---|---|---|---|---|---|---|---|---|
| Petrolina | 2019 | – | | | 6 (Note: Appearances in the Campeonato Pernambucano) | 0 | 0 | 0 | 0 | 0 | 6 | 0 |
| Retrô | 2019 | – | | | 7 (Note: Appearances in the Campeonato Pernambucano Série A2) | 0 | 0 | 0 | 0 | 0 | 7 | 0 |
| Retrô | 2020 | – | | | 0 | 0 | 0 | 0 | 0 | 0 | 0 | 0 |
| Retrô | Total | | 0 | 0 | 7 | 0 | 0 | 0 | 0 | 0 | 7 | 0 |
| Ipojuca | 2020 | – | | | 3 | 0 | 0 | 0 | 0 | 0 | 3 | 0 |
| Career total | | | 0 | 0 | 16 | 0 | 0 | 0 | 0 | 0 | 16 | 0 |
