= 2002 Kawasaki Frontale season =

Kawasaki Frontale
2002 season
- Manager: Nobuhiro Ishizaki
- Stadium: Todoroki Athletics Stadium
- J. League 2: 4th
- Emperor's Cup: Quarter-finals
- Top goalscorer: Bentinho (16)
Home colours	Away colours

The 2002 Kawasaki Frontale season. Kawasaki Frontale is a Japanese professional football club based in Kawasaki, Kanagawa Prefecture, south of Tokyo. This article summarizes the competition and results of the season.

== Competitions ==
Competitions	Position
J. League 2	4th / 12 clubs
Emperor's Cup	Quarterfinals

== Domestic results ==
=== J. League 2 ===
Match	Date	Venue	Opponents	Score
1	2002.3.3	Todoroki Athletics Stadium	Shonan Bellmare	1–1
2	2002.3.9	Todoroki Athletics Stadium	Omiya Ardija	2–0
3	2002.3.16	Hakata no mori stadium	Avispa Fukuoka	0–4
4	2002.3.21	Nagai Aid Stadium	Cerezo Osaka	2–2
5	2002.3.24	Todoroki Athletics Stadium	Mito HollyHock	1–0
6	2002.3.30	International Stadium Yokohama	Yokohama F.C.	3–2
7	2002.4.6	Tosu Stadium	Sagan Tosu	2–0
8	2002.4.10	Todoroki Athletics Stadium	Oita Trinita	1–1
9	2002.4.14	Niigata City Athletic Stadium	Albirex Niigata	1–2
10	2002.4.20	Todoroki Athletics Stadium	Montedio Yamagata	3–0
11	2002.4.24	Kose Sports Stadium	Ventforet Kofu	4–1
12	2002.4.27	Ōmiya Park Soccer Stadium	Omiya Ardija	0–0
13	2002.5.3	Todoroki Athletics Stadium	Cerezo Osaka	2–3
14	2002.5.6	Kasamatsu Stadium	Mito HollyHock	1–0
15	2002.5.12	Todoroki Athletics Stadium	Yokohama F.C.	1–2
16	2002.7.5	Todoroki Athletics Stadium	Sagan Tosu	2–1
17	2002.7.10	KKWing Stadium	Oita Trinita	0–5
18	2002.7.13	Todoroki Athletics Stadium	Ventforet Kofu	2–1
19	2002.7.20	Hiratsuka Athletics Stadium	Shonan Bellmare	0–2
20	2002.7.24	Todoroki Athletics Stadium	Albirex Niigata	2–0
21	2002.7.27	Yamagata Park Stadium	Montedio Yamagata	1–1
22	2002.8.1	Todoroki Athletics Stadium	Avispa Fukuoka	2–1
23	2002.8.7	Todoroki Athletics Stadium	Yokohama F.C.	1–0
24	2002.8.10	Kose Sports Stadium	Ventforet Kofu	2–2
25	2002.8.17	Todoroki Athletics Stadium	Oita Trinita	1–1
26	2002.8.21	Niigata City Athletic Stadium	Albirex Niigata	1–2
27	2002.8.25	Todoroki Athletics Stadium	Omiya Ardija	3–2
28	2002.8.31	Todoroki Athletics Stadium	Shonan Bellmare	4–0
29	2002.9.7	Tosu Stadium	Sagan Tosu	2–0
30	2002.9.11	Todoroki Athletics Stadium	Montedio Yamagata	0–0
31	2002.9.14	Nagai Stadium	Cerezo Osaka	3–3
32	2002.9.21	Todoroki Athletics Stadium	Mito HollyHock	2–0
33	2002.9.25	Hakata no mori stadium	Avispa Fukuoka	2–1
34	2002.9.28	Yumenoshima Stadium	Yokohama F.C.	2–0
35	2002.10.5	Todoroki Athletics Stadium	Albirex Niigata	1–2
36	2002.10.9	Yamagata Park Stadium	Montedio Yamagata	1–1
37	2002.10.13	Todoroki Athletics Stadium	Cerezo Osaka	2–1
38	2002.10.20	Saitama Stadium 2002	Omiya Ardija	0–1
39	2002.10.23	Todoroki Athletics Stadium	Avispa Fukuoka	4–3
40	2002.10.26	Kasamatsu Stadium	Mito HollyHock	2–1
41	2002.11.2	Todoroki Athletics Stadium	Sagan Tosu	2–1
42	2002.11.9	Ōita Stadium	Oita Trinita	1–2
43	2002.11.16	Todoroki Athletics Stadium	Ventforet Kofu	2–1
44	2002.11.24	Hiratsuka Athletics Stadium	Shonan Bellmare	0–0

=== Emperor's Cup ===
Match	Date	Venue	Opponents	Score
1st Round	2002..	[[]]	[[]]	-
2nd Round	2002..	[[]]	[[]]	-
3rd Round	2002..	[[]]	[[]]	-
4th Round	2002..	[[]]	[[]]	-
Quarterfinals	2002..	[[]]	[[]]	-

== Player statistics ==
No.	Pos.	Player	D.o.B. (Age)	Height / Weight	J. League 2		Emperor's Cup		Total	
No.	Pos.	Player	D.o.B. (Age)	Height / Weight	Apps	Goals	Apps	Goals	Apps	Goals
1	GK	Takeshi Urakami	February 7, 1969 (aged 33)	cm / kg	42	0				
2	DF	Hiroki Ito	July 27, 1978 (aged 23)	cm / kg	44	3				
3	DF	Hideki Sahara	May 15, 1978 (aged 23)	cm / kg	13	1				
4	MF	Marco	September 23, 1977 (aged 24)	cm / kg	2	0				
4	DF	Alex	April 16, 1983 (aged 18)	cm / kg	20	1				
5	DF	Yoshinobu Minowa	June 2, 1976 (aged 25)	cm / kg	40	4				
6	DF	Shuhei Terada	June 23, 1975 (aged 26)	cm / kg	4	1				
7	MF	Toru Oniki	April 20, 1974 (aged 27)	cm / kg	39	0				
8	MF	Tomoaki Kuno	September 25, 1973 (aged 28)	cm / kg	24	1				
9	FW	Bentinho	December 18, 1971 (aged 30)	cm / kg	36	16				
10	MF	Marquinho	March 7, 1976 (aged 25)	cm / kg	26	4				
11	MF	Yuzuki Ito	April 7, 1974 (aged 27)	cm / kg	4	2				
13	MF	Kensuke Kagami	November 21, 1974 (aged 27)	cm / kg	22	1				
14	MF	Takehito Shigehara	October 6, 1981 (aged 20)	cm / kg	30	0				
15	MF	Taketo Shiokawa	December 17, 1977 (aged 24)	cm / kg	38	4				
16	FW	Kenji Kikawada	October 28, 1974 (aged 27)	cm / kg	34	2				
17	GK	Shinya Yoshihara	April 19, 1978 (aged 23)	cm / kg	2	0				
18	MF	Akira Konno	September 12, 1974 (aged 27)	cm / kg	21	2				
19	FW	Kohei Hayashi	June 27, 1978 (aged 23)	cm / kg	11	1				
20	MF	Yasuhiro Nagahashi	August 2, 1975 (aged 26)	cm / kg	34	5				
21	FW	Yasutaka Kobayashi	June 15, 1980 (aged 21)	cm / kg	6	2				
22	DF	Makoto Kimura	June 10, 1979 (aged 22)	cm / kg	0	0				
23	MF	Seiichi Tamaoki	April 26, 1982 (aged 19)	cm / kg	0	0				
24	FW	Masaru Kurotsu	August 20, 1982 (aged 19)	cm / kg	8	1				
25	DF	Ryosuke Kanzaki	June 21, 1982 (aged 19)	cm / kg	0	0				
26	FW	Kazunori Iio	February 23, 1982 (aged 20)	cm / kg	7	2				
27	FW	Kazuki Ganaha	September 26, 1980 (aged 21)	cm / kg	21	3				
28	GK	Takashi Aizawa	January 5, 1982 (aged 20)	cm / kg	0	0				
29	DF	Ryoi Fujiki	September 8, 1983 (aged 18)	cm / kg	0	0				
30	MF	Takumi Watanabe	March 15, 1982 (aged 19)	cm / kg	14	0				
31	GK	Yohei Suzuki	October 14, 1983 (aged 18)	cm / kg	0	0				
32	DF	Kazunari Okayama	April 24, 1978 (aged 23)	cm / kg	37	1				
33	FW	Marlon	September 5, 1976 (aged 25)	cm / kg	23	12				

== Other pages ==
- (in Japanese) J. League official site
