= Mizuta Masahide =

Japanese poet and samurai

Mizuta Masahide (水田 正秀; 1657–1723) was a seventeenth-century (Edo period) Japanese poet and samurai who studied under Matsuo Bashō.

Masahide practiced medicine in Zeze and led a group of poets who built the Mumyō Hut.

== Examples ==
Barn's burnt down

My barn having burned to the ground
I can see the moon.

Alternate translation:

Since my house burned down
I now own a better view
of the rising moon

When bird passes on

When bird passes on --
like moon,
a friend to water.

Masahide's Death Poem

while I walk on
the moon keeps pace beside me:
friend in the water
