= Takashi Sekizuka =

Japanese footballer and manager

Takashi Sekizuka 関塚 隆
Personal information
- Full name: Takashi Sekizuka
- Date of birth: October 26, 1960 (age 66)
- Place of birth: Funabashi, Chiba, Japan
- Height: 1.76 m (5 ft 9 1/2 in)
- Position: Forward

Youth career
- 1976–1978: Yachiyo High School
- 1980–1983: Waseda University

Senior career*
Years	Team	Apps	(Gls)
1984–1991	Honda	112	(36)
Total		112	(36)

Managerial career
- 1998: Kashima Antlers (caretaker)
- 1999: Kashima Antlers (caretaker)
- 2004–2008: Kawasaki Frontale
- 2009: Kawasaki Frontale
- 2010–2012: Japan U-23
- 2013: Júbilo Iwata
- 2014–2016: JEF United Chiba
Medal record
Honda
Runner-up	JSL Cup	1991
- * Club domestic league appearances and goals

Takashi Sekizuka (関塚 隆, Sekizuka Takashi; born October 26, 1960) is a former Japanese football player and manager.

== Playing career ==
Sekizuka was born in Funabashi on October 26, 1960. After graduating from Waseda University, he joined Honda in 1984. In 1984 season, he was selected Rookie of the Year awards and Best Eleven. He played 112 games and scored 36 goals in Japan Soccer League. In 1991, he retired.

== Coaching career ==
After retirement, in 1993, Sekizuka became assistant coach for Kashima Antlers under manager Masakatsu Miyamoto. In 1995, he moved to Shimizu S-Pulse with Miyamoto. In 1996, he returned Kashima Antlers and coached until 2003. In July 1998 and August 1999, he also managed the club as caretaker manager. In 2004, he moved to J2 League club Kawasaki Frontale and became manager. In first season, he led the club to the champions and the club was promoted J1 League. In April 2008, he resigned for health reasons. In 2009, he returned the club as manager, but he resigned end of season. In September 2010, he became manager for Japan U-23 national team for 2012 Summer Olympics and assistant coach for Japan national team. At 2012 Summer Olympics, he led Japan to the 4th place. From 2013, he managed Júbilo Iwata (2013) and JEF United Chiba (2014-2016).

== Managerial statistics ==
Team	From	To	Record				
Team	From	To	G	W	D	L	Win %
Kashima Antlers	1998	1998	6	4	0	2	66.67
Kashima Antlers	1999	1999	1	0	0	1	0.00
Kawasaki Frontale	2004	2008	153	85	29	39	55.56
Kawasaki Frontale	2009	2009	34	19	7	8	55.88
Júbilo Iwata	2013	2013	21	3	7	11	14.29
JEF United Chiba	2014	2016	97	38	30	29	39.18
Total			312	149	73	90	47.76

== Awards ==
- Japan Soccer League Rookie of the Year: 1984
- Japan Soccer League Best Eleven: 1984
