= 2007 J.League Cup =

J.League Yamazaki Nabisco Cup

Tournament details
- Country: Japan
- Dates: March 21 and November 3

Final positions
- Champions: Gamba Osaka (1st title)
- Runners-up: Kawasaki Frontale
- Semifinalists: Yokohama F. Marinos; Kashima Antlers

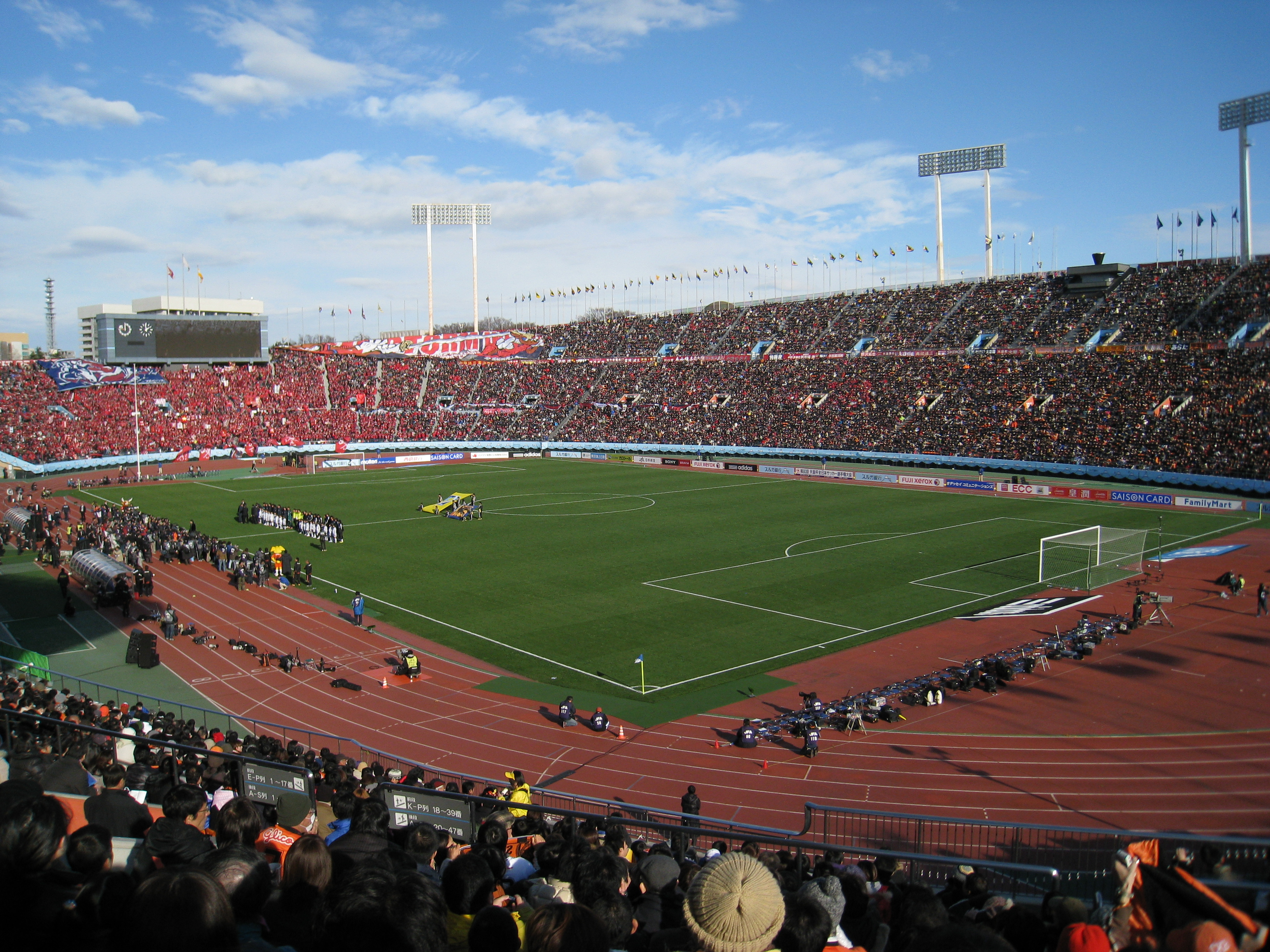
The National Kasumigaoka Stadium, where the 2011 Emperor’s Cup final was held

The 2007 edition of the J.League Cup, officially the 2007 J.League Yamazaki Nabisco Cup, sponsored by Nabisco began on March 21 with reigning champions JEF United seeking to claim their 3rd successive crown. This would equal the record set by Verdy Kawasaki when the competition began in 1992. The top 4 teams of each qualifying group automatically qualified for the quarterfinals with the best two remaining runners-up. Both Kawasaki Frontale and Urawa Red Diamonds were exempt from competing in the group stage, due to their entry into the Asian Champions League. They were therefore entered into the quarter-final stage which begins in the summer.

The final was on November 3 at the Tokyo National Stadium. The winners were Gamba Osaka, beating Kawasaki Frontale in the final 1-0 to claim its first J.League Cup. They qualified for the 2008 Pan-Pacific Championship and the 2008 Suruga Bank Championship.

== Group stage ==
=== Group A ===
Team	Pld	W	D	L	GF	GA	GD	Pts
Sanfrecce Hiroshima	6	4	0	2	6	5	+1	12
Gamba Osaka	6	3	1	2	10	6	+4	10
JEF United Chiba	6	3	0	3	7	5	+2	9
Vissel Kobe	6	1	1	4	6	13	−7	4

March 21, 2007
Sanfrecce Hiroshima	0 – 3	Gamba Osaka
Vissel Kobe	1 – 4	JEF United
March 25, 2007
Gamba Osaka	2 – 2	Vissel Kobe
JEF United	2 – 1	Sanfrecce Hiroshima
April 4, 2007
Gamba Osaka	0 – 1	JEF United
Sanfrecce Hiroshima	2 – 0	Vissel Kobe
April 11, 2007
JEF United	0 – 1	Gamba Osaka
Vissel Kobe	0 – 1	Sanfrecce Hiroshima
May 9, 2007
Gamba Osaka	0 – 1	Sanfrecce Hiroshima
JEF United	0 – 1	Vissel Kobe
May 23, 2007
Sanfrecce Hiroshima	1 – 0	JEF United
Vissel Kobe	2 – 4	Gamba Osaka

=== Group B ===
Team	Pld	W	D	L	GF	GA	GD	Pts
Yokohama F. Marinos	6	2	2	2	8	7	+1	8
Shimizu S-Pulse	6	2	2	2	8	7	+1	8
Kashiwa Reysol	6	2	2	2	6	6	0	8
Omiya Ardija	6	2	2	2	5	7	−2	8

March 21, 2007
Kashiwa Reysol	2 – 1	Shimizu S-Pulse
Yokohama F-Marinos	0 – 1	Omiya Ardija
March 25, 2007
Omiya Ardija	2 – 1	Kashiwa Reysol
Shimizu S-Pulse	2 – 2	Yokohama F-Marinos
April 4, 2007
Kashiwa Reysol	0 – 0	Omiya Ardija
Yokohama F-Marinos	2 – 0	Shimizu S-Pulse
April 11, 2007
Omiya Ardija	1 – 1	Yokohama F-Marinos
Shimizu S-Pulse	0 – 0	Kashiwa Reysol
May 9, 2007
Yokohama F-Marinos	3 – 0	Kashiwa Reysol
Omiya Ardija	1 – 2	Shimizu S-Pulse
May 23, 2007
Kashiwa Reysol	3 – 0	Yokohama F-Marinos
Shimizu S-Pulse	3 – 0	Omiya Ardija

=== Group C ===
Team	Pld	W	D	L	GF	GA	GD	Pts
FC Tokyo	6	3	1	2	7	7	0	10
Yokohama FC	6	3	0	3	6	5	+1	9
Oita Trinita	6	3	0	3	6	6	0	9
Júbilo Iwata	6	2	1	3	7	8	−1	7

March 21, 2007
Ōita Trinita	1 – 0	Yokohama FC
Júbilo Iwata	2 – 2	FC Tokyo
March 25, 2007
FC Tokyo	0 – 2	Ōita Trinita
Yokohama FC	2 – 0	Júbilo Iwata
April 4, 2007
Júbilo Iwata	0 – 1	Yokohama FC
Ōita Trinita	0 – 1	FC Tokyo
April 11, 2007
FC Tokyo	2 – 1	Júbilo Iwata
Yokohama FC	1 – 2	Ōita Trinita
May 9, 2007
Júbilo Iwata	1 – 0	Ōita Trinita
FC Tokyo	0 – 1	Yokohama FC
May 23, 2007
Ōita Trinita	1 – 3	Júbilo Iwata
Yokohama FC	1 – 2	FC Tokyo

=== Group D ===
Team	Pld	W	D	L	GF	GA	GD	Pts
Kashima Antlers	6	4	0	2	12	7	+5	12
Ventforet Kofu	6	3	1	2	5	6	−1	10
Albirex Niigata	6	2	3	1	8	6	+2	9
Nagoya Grampus Eight	6	0	2	4	5	11	−6	2

March 21, 2007
Ventforet Kofu	2 – 1	Nagoya Grampus Eight
Albirex Niigata	3 – 1	Kashima Antlers
March 25, 2007
Kashima Antlers	2 – 1	Albirex Niigata
Nagoya Grampus Eight	0 – 1	Ventforet Kofu
April 4, 2007
Kashima Antlers	0 – 1	Ventforet Kofu
Nagoya Grampus Eight	2 – 2	Albirex Niigata
April 11, 2007
Kashima Antlers	2 – 1	Nagoya Grampus Eight
Albirex Niigata	2 – 1	Ventforet Kofu
May 9, 2007
Nagoya Grampus Eight	1 – 4	Kashima Antlers
Ventforet Kofu	0 – 0	Albirex Niigata
May 23, 2007
Ventforet Kofu	0 – 3	Kashima Antlers
Albirex Niigata	0 – 0	Nagoya Grampus Eight

== Knockout stage ==
=== Quarterfinals ===
Match	Team #1	Agg.	Team #2	1st leg	2nd leg
A	Urawa Red Diamonds	3-6	Gamba Osaka	1-1	2-5
B	Ventforet Kofu	5-6	Kawasaki Frontale	3-2	2-4
C	Yokohama F. Marinos	4-3	F.C. Tokyo	0-1	4-2
D	Sanfrecce Hiroshima	2-3	Kashima Antlers	1-0	1-3

=== Semifinals ===
==== Semifinals Match#1 ====
Gamba Osaka and Kashima Antlers ties on the aggregate with 3 – 3; Gamba Osaka advance to the final on away goal rule.

October 10, 2007
19:00

Gamba Osaka	1 – 0	Kashima Antlers
Endo 57'	Report

Osaka Expo '70 Stadium, Suita
Attendance: 8,157
Referee: Joji Kashihara

October 13, 2007
15:00

Kashima Antlers	3 – 2	Gamba Osaka
Motoyama 41', 44'; Ogasawara 51'	Report	49' Bando; 66' Sidiclei

Kashima Soccer Stadium, Kashima
Attendance: 16,279
Referee: Yuichi Nishimura

==== Semifinals Match#2 ====
Kawasaki Frontale advances to the final on aggregate score of 6 – 3.

October 10, 2007
19:00

Yokohama F. Marinos	1 – 2	Kawasaki Frontale
Yamase 47'	Official Report	8', 59' Juninho

Nissan Stadium, Yokohama
Attendance: 11,181
Referee: Kenji Ogiya

October 13, 2007
15:00

Kawasaki Frontale	4 – 2	Yokohama F. Marinos
Ito 20'; Jong Tae-Se 23'; Juninho 35'; Kurotsu 89'	Official Report	7' Ōshima; 37' Sakata

Todoroki Stadium, Kawasaki
Attendance: 15,948
Referee: Masayoshi Okada

=== Final ===
November 3, 2007
13:39

Kawasaki Frontale	0 – 1	Gamba Osaka
	Official Report	55' Yasuda

National Stadium, Tokyo
Attendance: 41,569
Referee: Toshimitsu Yoshida

== Awards ==
- MVP: Michihiro Yasuda (Gamba Osaka)
- Top Scorer: Daisuke Sudo (Ventforet Kofu); 6 goals.
- New Hero Prize: Michihiro Yasuda (Gamba Osaka)
