= 2000 J.League Cup =

J.League Yamazaki Nabisco Cup

Tournament details
- Country: Japan
- Dates: 12 April and 4 November 2000
- Teams: 27

Final positions
- Champions: Kashima Antlers (2nd title)
- Runners-up: Kawasaki Frontale
- Semifinalists: Kyoto Purple Sanga; Nagoya Grampus Eight

Tournament statistics
- Matches played: 51

Awards
- MVP Award: Koji Nakata

Statistics of J. League Cup, officially the 2000 J.League Yamazaki Nabisco Cup, in the 2000 season.

== Overview ==
It was contested by 27 teams, and Kashima Antlers won the cup. There were 22 teams played the first round, with 5 teams getting byes to the second round.

== Results ==
=== First round ===
- Montedio Yamagata 0–3; 1–0 Sanfrecce Hiroshima
- Omiya Ardija 0–4; 0–2 Vissel Kobe
- Kawasaki Frontale 3–0; 1–2 Urawa Red Diamonds
- Shonan Bellmare 2–3; 0–0 Avispa Fukuoka
- Ventforet Kofu 0–2; 1–5 Yokohama F. Marinos
- Albirex Niigata 0–1; 1–3 Kyoto Purple Sanga
- Cerezo Osaka 2–0; 1–0 Vegalta Sendai
- Sagan Tosu 0–1; 1–2 Verdy Kawasaki
- Oita Trinita 2–2; 1–3 JEF United Ichihara
- Gamba Osaka 2–1; 1–0 Consadole Sapporo
- Shimizu S-Pulse 4–1; 3–1 Mito HollyHock

=== Second round ===
- Yokohama F. Marinos 4–1; 0–1 Sanfrecce Hiroshima
- Kawasaki Frontale 1–0; 1–1 Kashiwa Reysol
- Verdy Kawasaki 1–0; 1–0 Cerezo Osaka
- Kyoto Purple Sanga 1–1; 0–1 FC Tokyo
- Gamba Osaka 0–1; 2–1 Jubilo Iwata
- Avispa Fukuoka 1–1; 2–3 Kashima Antlers
- JEF United Ichihara 1–1; 1–2 Nagoya Grampus Eight
- Vissel Kobe 2–0; 0–4 Shimizu S-Pulse

=== Quarterfinals ===
- Verdy Kawasaki 0–0; 0–2 Kawasaki Frontale
- Jubilo Iwata 1–1; 1–2 Kyoto Purple Sanga
- Yokohama F. Marinos 1–2; 1–1 Kashima Antlers
- Shimizu S-Pulse 4–6; 0–0 Nagoya Grampus Eight

=== Semifinals ===
- Kyoto Purple Sanga 0–2; 2–1 Kawasaki Frontale
- Nagoya Grampus Eight 1–3; 2–3 Kashima Antlers

=== Final ===
- Kashima Antlers 2–0 Kawasaki Frontale

Kashima Antlers won the cup.
