= 2017 J2 League =

Meiji Yasuda J2 League
- Season: 2017
- Champions: Shonan Bellmare; 2nd J2 title 4th D2 title
- Promoted: Shonan Bellmare; V-Varen Nagasaki; Nagoya Grampus
- Relegated: Thespakusatsu Gunma
- Matches: 462
- Goals: 1,198 (2.59 per match)
- Top goalscorer: Ibba Laajab (Yokohama FC) (25 goals)
- Highest attendance: 36,755; Nagoya 1–1 Kyoto (3 May 2017)
- Lowest attendance: 1,191; Sanuki 0-0 Yamagata (22 Oct 2017)
- Average attendance: 6,970

The 2017 Meiji Yasuda J2 League (2017 明治安田生命J2リーグ) season was the 46th season of the second-tier club football in Japan and the 19th season since the establishment of J2 League.

== Clubs ==
Locations of the 2017 J2 League teams

The participating clubs are listed in the following table:

Club name	Home town(s)	Note(s)
Avispa Fukuoka	Fukuoka City, Fukuoka	Relegated from J1 League in 2016
Ehime FC	All cities/towns in Ehime (Note: centering on Matsuyama)	
Fagiano Okayama	All cities/towns in Okayama (Note: centering on Okayama, Kurashiki, Tsuyama)	
FC Gifu	All cities/towns in Gifu (Note: centering on Gifu)	
JEF United Chiba	Chiba & Ichihara, Chiba	
Kamatamare Sanuki	Takamatsu, Kagawa	
Kyoto Sanga	Southwestern cities/towns in Kyoto (Note: Kyoto, Uji, Joyo, Kyōtanabe, Mukō, Nagaokakyō, Kizugawa, Kameoka, Nantan, Kyotanba)	
Machida Zelvia	Machida, Tokyo	
Matsumoto Yamaga	Central cities/towns in Nagano (Note: Matsumoto, Nagano, Azumino, Yamagata, Shiojiri, Ōmachi, Ikeda)	
Mito HollyHock	Mito, Ibaraki	
Montedio Yamagata	All cities/towns in Yamagata (Note: centering on Yamagata, Tendō, Tsuruoka)	
Nagoya Grampus	All Aichi Prefecture (Note: centering on Nagoya, Toyota, Miyoshi)	Relegated from J1 League in 2016
Oita Trinita	Ōita	Promoted from J3 League in 2016
Renofa Yamaguchi	All cities/towns in Yamaguchi (Note: centering on Yamaguchi, Shimonoseki, Sanyoonoda, Ube)	
Roasso Kumamoto	Kumamoto	
Shonan Bellmare	Shonan part of Kanagawa (Note: Hiratsuka, Kanagawa, Atsugi, Isehara, Odawara, Chigasaki, Hadano, Fujisawa, Ōiso, Samukawa, Ninomiya, Kamakura, Minamiashigara, Oi, Kaisei, Nakai, Hakone, Matsuda, Manazuru, Yamakita, Yugawara)	Relegated from J1 League in 2016
Thespakusatsu Gunma	All cities/towns in Gunma (Note: centering on Kusatsu, Maebashi)	
Tokushima Vortis	All cities/towns in Tokushima (Note: centering on Tokushima, Naruto, Mima, Matsushige, Itano, Aizumi, Kitajima)	
Tokyo Verdy	All cities/towns in Tokyo	
V-Varen Nagasaki	All cities/towns in Nagasaki (Note: centering on Nagasaki, Isahaya)	
Yokohama FC	Yokohama, Kanagawa	
Zweigen Kanazawa	Kanazawa	Won J2-J3 Relegation Playoff

=== Personnel and kits ===
Club	Manager	Captain	Kit manufacturer
Avispa Fukuoka	(Japan) Masami Ihara	(Japan) Yuta Mikado	ATHLETA
Ehime FC	(Japan) Shuichi Mase	(Japan) Shuto Kojima	Mizuno
Fagiano Okayama	(Japan) Tetsu Nagasawa	(Japan) Kohei Kiyama	Penalty
FC Gifu	(Japan) Takeshi Oki	(Japan) Yoshihiro Shoji	New Balance
JEF United Chiba	(Argentina) Juan Esnáider	(Japan) Naoya Kondo	Kappa
Kamatamare Sanuki	(Japan) Makoto Kitano	(Japan) Kenta Shimizu	ATHLETA
Kyoto Sanga	(Japan) Takanori Nunobe	(Japan) Takanori Sugeno	Wacoal
Machida Zelvia	(Japan) Naoki Soma	(North Korea) Ri Han-jae	SVOLME
Matsumoto Yamaga	(Japan) Yasuharu Sorimachi	(Japan) Masaki Iida	Adidas
Mito HollyHock	(Japan) Takayuki Nishigaya	(Japan) Keisuke Funatani	GAViC
Montedio Yamagata	(Japan) Takashi Kiyama	(Japan) Takuya Honda	New Balance
Nagoya Grampus	(Japan) Yahiro Kazama	(Japan) Hisato Sato	Mizuno
Oita Trinita	(Japan) Tomohiro Katanosaka	(Japan) Satoru Yamagishi	Puma
Renofa Yamaguchi	(Argentina) Carlos Mayor	(Japan) Yuya Torikai	Finta
Roasso Kumamoto	(Japan) Hiroyuki Kiyokawa	(Japan) Takuya Sonoda	Puma
Shonan Bellmare	(South Korea) Cho Kwi-jea	(Japan) Kaoru Takayama	Penalty
Thespakusatsu Gunma	(Japan) Hitoshi Morishita	(Japan) Yuya Yamagishi	Finta
Tokushima Vortis	(Spain) Ricardo Rodríguez	(Japan) Ken Iwao	Mizuno
Tokyo Verdy	(Spain) Miguel Ángel Lotina	(Japan) Akira Ibayashi	ATHLETA
V-Varen Nagasaki	(Japan) Takuya Takagi	(Japan) Yusuke Murakami	hummel
Yokohama FC	(Japan) Hitoshi Nakata	(Japan) Kensuke Sato	SOCCER JUNKY
Zweigen Kanazawa	(Japan) Masaaki Yanagishita	(Japan) Tomonobu Hiroi	Adidas

=== Managerial changes ===
Team	Outgoing manager	Date of separation	Manner of departure	Incoming manager	Date of announcement
Nagoya Grampus	(North Macedonia) Boško Gjurovski	6 November 2016	End of caretaker spell	(Japan) Yahiro Kazama	4 January 2017
Renofa Yamaguchi	(Japan) Nobuhiro Ueno	23 May 2017	Sacked	(Argentina) Carlos Mayor	5 June 2017
Roasso Kumamoto	(Japan) Hiroyuki Kiyokawa	14 June 2017	Sacked	(Japan) Tomoyoshi Ikeya	14 June 2017
Yokohama FC	(Japan) Hitoshi Nakata	15 October 2017	Sacked	(Brazil) Edson Tavares	24 October 2017

=== Foreign players ===
Players name in bold indicates the player is registered during the summer transfer window.

Clubs	Player 1	Player 2	Player 3	Player 4	Player 5	Other	Former
Nagoya Grampus	(Brazil) Felipe Garcia	(Brazil) **Gabriel Xavier**	(Brazil) Washington	(South Korea) **Lim Seung-gyeom**	(Sweden) Robin Simović		(Brazil) Charles
Shonan Bellmare	(Australia) Tando Velaphi	(Brazil) André Bahia	(Brazil) Dinei	(Serbia) **Dragan Mrđa**			(Brazil) Chiquinho
Avispa Fukuoka	(Brazil) **Euller**	(Brazil) Gilsinho	(Brazil) Wellington	(Brazil) Willian Popp	(South Korea) **Won Du-jae**		(Colombia) Danilson Córdoba
Ehime FC	(China) Ju Feng	(South Korea) Park Seung-su					
Fagiano Okayama	(Argentina) **Nicolás Orsini**	(South Korea) Jang Suk-won	(South Korea) **Kim Jong-min**	(South Korea) Lee Kyung-tae	(South Korea) Park Hyung-jin		
FC Gifu	(Brazil) Cristian	(Brazil) Henik	(Spain) Sisinio	(Spain) Víctor Ibáñez			
Oita Trinita	(Brazil) **Chiquinho**						
Mito HollyHock	(Brazil) Paulão						(South Korea) Kwon Young-jin
JEF United Chiba	(Argentina) Joaquín Larrivey	(Argentina) **Luis Ojeda**	(Paraguay) Eduardo Aranda	(Paraguay) Jorge Salinas	(South Korea) Kim Byeom-yong		(South Korea) Lee Joo-young
Kamatamare Sanuki	(Brazil) **Alex**	(Brazil) Allan	(Brazil) Evson	(South Korea) **Lee Joo-young**	(South Korea) Yoon Seon-ho	(North Korea) Ri Yong-jik	
Montedio Yamagata	(South Korea) Lee Je-seung						(South Korea) Koo Bon-hyeok
Renofa Yamaguchi	(Argentina) **Abel Luciatti**	(Argentina) **Leonardo Ramos**	(Argentina) **Marcelo Vidal**	(South Korea) Park Chan-yong			
Roasso Kumamoto	(Brazil) Gustavo	(Brazil) **Júnior Fell**	(Brazil) Morbeck	(South Korea) Lim Jin-woo	(South Korea) Yang Sang-jun	(North Korea) An Byong-jun	
Kyoto Sanga	(Belgium) Kevin Oris	(South Korea) Ha Sung-min	(South Korea) Lee Yong-jae				
Thespakusatsu Gunma	(Brazil) Matheus	(South Korea) Choi Joon-gi	(South Korea) Kang Su-il	(South Korea) **Yeo Sung-hye**	(South Korea) Park Gon	(North Korea) Park Seung-ri	(South Korea) Han Ho-dong
Tokyo Verdy	(Brazil) Alan Pinheiro	(Brazil) Douglas	(Spain) **Carlos Martínez**				
V-Varen Nagasaki	(Spain) Juanma	(Spain) Miguel Pallardó	(South Korea) Song Young-Min				
Tokushima Vortis	(Brazil) Carlinhos	(Serbia) Nikola Vasiljević	(South Korea) Kim Jong-pil				(Serbia) Nikola Ašćerić
Matsumoto Yamaga	(Brazil) **Davi**	(Brazil) Diego	(Brazil) Paulinho	(Brazil) Serginho	(South Korea) Goh Dong Min		(South Korea) Yeo Sung-hye
Yokohama FC	(Brazil) **Leandro Domingues**	(Netherlands) Calvin Jong-a-Pin	(Norway) Ibba Laajab	(South Korea) Jeong Chung-geun			
Machida Zelvia	(Montenegro) Boris Tatar	(North Korea) Kim Song-gi				(North Korea) Ri Han-jae	
Zweigen Kanazawa	(South Korea) **Byeon Jun-byum**	(South Korea) Kim Tea-sung					(Brazil) Mendes

== League table ==
Pos	Team	Pld	W	D	L	GF	GA	GD	Pts	Promotion, qualification or relegation
1	Shonan Bellmare (C, P)	42	24	11	7	58	36	+22	83	Promotion to 2018 J1 League
2	V-Varen Nagasaki (P)	42	24	8	10	59	41	+18	80	Promotion to 2018 J1 League
3	Nagoya Grampus (O, P)	42	23	6	13	85	65	+20	75	Qualification for promotion playoffs (Note: Only teams that meet J1 license criteria can participate in promotion playoffs. If one or more teams fail to meet the criteria, only eligible teams that finished 3rd to 6th will participate and no replacement teams will be added.)
4	Avispa Fukuoka	42	21	11	10	54	36	+18	74	Qualification for promotion playoffs
5	Tokyo Verdy	42	20	10	12	64	49	+15	70	Qualification for promotion playoffs
6	JEF United Chiba	42	20	8	14	70	58	+12	68	Qualification for promotion playoffs
7	Tokushima Vortis	42	18	13	11	71	45	+26	67	
8	Matsumoto Yamaga	42	19	9	14	61	45	+16	66	
9	Oita Trinita	42	17	13	12	58	50	+8	64	
10	Yokohama FC	42	17	12	13	60	49	+11	63	
11	Montedio Yamagata	42	14	17	11	45	47	−2	59	
12	Kyoto Sanga	42	14	15	13	55	47	+8	57	
13	Fagiano Okayama	42	13	16	13	44	49	−5	55	
14	Mito HollyHock	42	14	12	16	45	48	−3	54	
15	Ehime FC	42	14	9	19	54	68	−14	51	
16	Machida Zelvia	42	11	17	14	53	53	0	50	
17	Zweigen Kanazawa	42	13	10	19	49	67	−18	49	
18	FC Gifu	42	11	13	18	56	68	−12	46	
19	Kamatamare Sanuki	42	8	14	20	41	61	−20	38	
20	Renofa Yamaguchi	42	11	5	26	48	69	−21	38	
21	Roasso Kumamoto	42	9	10	23	36	59	−23	37	
22	Thespakusatsu Gunma (R)	42	5	5	32	32	88	−56	20	Relegation to 2018 J3 League (Note: Direct exchange between J2 and J3 is subject to eligibility of J2-licensed teams in top 2 of 2017 J3 League.)

Updated to match(es) played on 28 November 2017. Source: 2017 MEIJI YASUDA J2 LEAGUE League table
Rules for classification: 1) Points; 2) Goal difference; 3) Goals scored
(C) Champions; (O) Play-off winners; (P) Promoted; (R) Relegated

== Results ==
Home \ Away	AVI	BEL	EHI	FAG	GIF	GRA	HOL	JEF	KAM	MON	REN	ROS	SAN	SPA	TRI	VVN	VER	VOR	YAM	YFC	ZEL	ZWE
Avispa Fukuoka		2–1	0–1	1–0	1–0	3–1	0–0	0–1	3–1	2–0	2–1	2–1	2–1	1–3	1–2	0–1	1–0	0–1	1–1	0–0	1–3	0–2
Shonan Bellmare	0–3		1–0	1–1	3–3	2–1	3–0	2–0	1–0	0–1	1–0	0–0	1–0	3–1	0–1	1–1	2–0	2–0	2–1	2–2	1–1	4–2
Ehime FC	0–1	0–1		2–0	2–0	1–2	0–0	1–0	2–1	2–0	2–1	1–0	0–2	4–2	2–2	1–0	0–3	1–3	0–0	2–3	1–1	1–0
Fagiano Okayama	1–1	0–2	0–1		1–1	0–1	3–0	2–1	0–1	2–1	2–1	1–1	2–1	2–1	0–3	2–0	0–1	3–2	0–0	2–1	1–1	0–1
FC Gifu	1–2	1–1	2–1	1–1		2–6	2–1	4–6	0–1	1–1	2–2	1–2	3–2	2–0	1–2	4–4	1–2	0–2	0–1	1–2	0–2	1–0
Nagoya Grampus	3–1	3–2	7–4	2–0	1–1		2–1	0–3	2–1	1–0	0–2	5–1	1–1	4–2	0–1	2–0	4–1	0–2	5–2	2–3	2–1	2–3
Mito HollyHock	1–1	0–1	1–0	1–0	1–2	1–1		3–1	2–1	0–1	1–1	2–2	2–0	4–0	2–0	0–2	3–2	1–1	0–1	0–0	3–2	4–0
JEF United Chiba	0–0	0–1	4–2	3–1	1–3	2–0	2–1		4–3	1–1	2–1	1–1	2–2	1–1	4–1	5–0	2–2	2–0	5–1	2–1	2–1	2–0
Kamatamare Sanuki	2–2	3–0	2–2	1–1	1–3	0–2	2–0	1–1		0–0	1–3	0–0	0–4	1–2	0–1	0–1	0–0	0–0	1–1	1–0	2–2	1–0
Montedio Yamagata	0–0	3–0	2–2	1–1	4–1	0–0	0–0	2–2	0–0		3–2	0–1	2–2	1–0	3–2	0–0	1–0	1–6	1–0	2–0	1–3	2–1
Renofa Yamaguchi	1–2	3–5	1–1	0–1	0–1	1–3	1–0	0–1	1–0	2–0		1–2	1–1	3–2	2–3	0–3	0–2	1–1	1–2	1–2	0–1	0–1
Roasso Kumamoto	1–1	0–1	2–1	0–1	0–0	0–1	2–3	1–0	2–1	1–1	0–2		0–3	1–2	0–1	0–2	4–0	1–1	2–0	1–4	0–1	1–4
Kyoto Sanga	0–1	0–0	3–2	1–1	1–1	3–1	1–1	2–0	1–0	1–2	1–2	2–1		1–0	2–2	0–1	0–1	1–0	1–1	2–2	2–2	1–3
Thespakusatsu Gunma	1–3	0–2	0–3	1–2	0–2	1–4	0–1	2–0	1–2	0–1	2–1	1–1	1–1		0–4	1–4	1–2	0–2	0–2	1–1	0–1	1–1
Oita Trinita	1–1	0–0	1–1	1–1	3–3	4–1	0–0	1–2	2–1	1–1	2–0	2–1	1–3	1–0		1–2	0–2	0–1	0–0	2–2	1–3	1–0
V-Varen Nagasaki	0–1	0–2	2–0	3–0	2–1	1–1	0–0	2–1	3–1	2–0	2–1	1–0	1–0	4–0	2–1		1–0	2–1	1–0	1–1	0–0	2–1
Tokyo Verdy	0–0	2–3	3–3	1–1	1–0	2–1	4–0	3–0	3–3	3–1	1–2	1–0	1–2	3–1	1–0	2–1		2–1	1–2	1–1	3–1	2–1
Tokushima Vortis	2–1	0–1	4–1	3–3	1–1	2–2	2–3	0–1	1–1	1–1	5–0	3–0	1–1	4–1	1–0	3–1	1–0		0–2	2–2	2–2	1–1
Matsumoto Yamaga	0–1	1–2	2–1	1–1	2–1	1–2	0–1	3–1	4–0	3–2	2–3	1–0	0–1	3–0	0–2	3–0	1–1	3–1		3–1	1–1	4–0
Yokohama FC	1–3	0–1	4–0	1–1	1–0	1–2	1–0	4–0	2–1	0–1	1–0	2–0	2–0	1–0	1–2	2–1	1–1	0–2	1–0		2–2	2–0
Machida Zelvia	0–1	0–0	1–2	1–1	0–1	3–4	2–0	0–1	1–1	0–0	0–1	2–1	0–2	2–0	2–2	1–1	2–4	0–1	1–2	1–0		1–1
Zweigen Kanazawa	0–5	0–0	1–2	1–2	0–1	3–4	2–0	2–1	1–1	1–1	3–2	0–2	0–2	2–0	2–2	1–1	2–4	0–1	0–4	3–2	2–2	

Updated to match(es) played on 19 November 2017. Source: J.League Data
Legend: Blue = home team win; Yellow = draw; Red = away team win.

== Play-offs ==
=== J1 League Promotion Playoffs ===
2017 J.League Road To J1 Play-Offs (2017 J1昇格プレーオフ)

Semifinals
3	Nagoya Grampus	4
6	JEF United Chiba	2
4	Avispa Fukuoka	1
5	Tokyo Verdy	0

Final
3	Nagoya Grampus	0
4	Avispa Fukuoka	0

=== Semifinals ===
26 November 2017
13:00

Avispa Fukuoka	1–0	Tokyo Verdy
Yamase 14'	Report

Egao Kenkō Stadium, Kumamoto
Attendance: 9,019

26 November 2017
16:00

Nagoya Grampus	4–2	JEF United
Taguchi 61'; Simović 66', 86', 90+6'	Report	Larrivey 45+2', 90'

Paloma Mizuho Stadium, Nagoya, Aichi
Attendance: 18,350

=== Final ===
3 December 2017
16:00

Nagoya Grampus	0–0	Avispa Fukuoka
	Report

Toyota Stadium, Toyota, Aichi
Attendance: 37,959

Nagoya Grampus was promoted to J1 League.

== Season statistics ==
=== Top scorers ===
As of match played 19 November 2017.

Rank	Player	Club	Goals
1	(Norway) Ibba Laajab	Yokohama FC	25
2	(Japan) Daiki Watari	Tokushima Vortis	23
3	(Brazil) Wellington	Avispa Fukuoka	19
3	(Japan) Hiroyuki Takasaki	Matsumoto Yamaga	19
3	(Argentina) Joaquin Larrivey	JEF United Chiba	19
6	(Brazil) Alan Pinheiro	Tokyo Verdy	14
6	(Japan) Yusuke Goto	Oita Trinita	14
8	(Japan) Tulio	Kyoto Sanga	13
8	(Sweden) Robin Simovic	Nagoya Grampus	13
8	(Brazil) Douglas Vieira	Tokyo Verdy	13
8	(Japan) Daizen Maeda	Mito HollyHock	13

== Attendances ==
Pos	Team	Total	High	Low	Average	Change
1	Nagoya Grampus	322,672	36,755	7,046	15,365	−13.3%^{†}
2	Matsumoto Yamaga	255,076	15,872	8,982	12,146	−10.9%
3	JEF United Chiba	209,637	15,994	6,230	9,983	−3.0%
4	Avispa Fukuoka	200,546	16,336	6,021	9,550	−25.7%^{†}
5	Fagiano Okayama	198,883	12,286	6,275	9,471	−5.5%
6	Shonan Bellmare	177,527	12,480	4,453	8,454	−26.7%^{†}
7	Oita Trinita	169,328	11,370	6,136	8,063	+3.8%^{‡}
8	FC Gifu	146,518	17,027	3,650	6,977	+23.2%
9	Kyoto Sanga	141,705	10,750	4,896	6,748	+3.4%
10	Montedio Yamagata	138,232	12,743	3,707	6,582	+5.2%
11	Roasso Kumamoto	137,698	13,990	3,944	6,557	+18.3%
12	Tokyo Verdy	130,334	14,541	2,786	6,206	+14.9%
13	Yokohama FC	125,301	13,244	2,284	5,967	+22.0%
14	V-Varen Nagasaki	124,756	22,407	3,189	5,941	+13.7%
15	Renofa Yamaguchi	114,538	9,651	3,369	5,454	−18.0%
16	Tokushima Vortis	104,577	7,583	3,106	4,979	+9.1%
17	Mito HollyHock	103,549	9,240	3,023	4,931	−8.1%
18	Zweigen Kanazawa	92,336	11,173	2,780	4,397	+5.2%
19	Machida Zelvia	85,177	8,124	2,383	4,056	−20.8%
20	Ehime FC	81,193	7,117	1,958	3,866	−5.5%
21	Thespakusatsu Gunma	80,465	6,828	1,402	3,832	−19.2%
22	Kamatamare Sanuki	79,908	7,994	1,191	3,805	+3.2%
	League total	3,219,936	36,755	1,191	6,970	0.0%

Updated to games played on 19 November 2017
Source: J. League Data
Notes:
^{†} Last year in J1 League.^{‡} Last year in J3 League.
