= 2016 J2 League =

Meiji Yasuda J2 League
- Season: 2016
- Champions: Hokkaido Consadole Sapporo; 6th D2 title
- Promoted: Hokkaido Consadole Sapporo; Shimizu S-Pulse; Cerezo Osaka
- Relegated: Giravanz Kitakyushu
- Matches: 462
- Goals: 1,108 (2.4 per match)
- Top goalscorer: Jong Tae-se (Shimizu S-Pulse) (26 goals)
- Highest attendance: 33,697; Sapporo vs Kanazawa (20 November)
- Lowest attendance: 1,795; Giravanz Kitakyushu vs Kanazawa (6 June)
- Average attendance: 6,973

The 2016 Meiji Yasuda J2 League (2016 明治安田生命J2リーグ) season was the 45th season of second-tier club football in Japan and the 18th season since the establishment of J2 League.

== Clubs ==
Locations of the 2016 J2 League teams

Omiya Ardija have stayed in the second division for just a year, winning promotion as the champions. Júbilo Iwata have spent only 2 seasons in J2 after their first relegation from the J1 League in 2013 after 20 seasons. Third-placed Avispa Fukuoka won the promotion playoffs and will return to the first division after playing in the J2 for four years. Matsumoto Yamaga were relegated from the J1 immediately after their inaugural promotion. Shimizu S-Pulse also suffered their first relegation to the J2 after 23 seasons in the J1, while Montedio Yamagata returned after one season.

On the other end of the table, Renofa Yamaguchi have been promoted from the 2015 J3 League as the champions of the second season of the J3 League, replacing Tochigi SC and becoming the first club based in Yamaguchi Prefecture to play in the second tier since Eidai SC back in 1973. J3 runners-up Machida Zelvia were also promoted by beating Oita Trinita in the promotion-relegation playoffs.

The participating clubs are listed in the following table:

Club name	Home town(s)	Note(s)
Cerezo Osaka	Osaka & Sakai, Osaka	2015 Play-off finalist
Consadole Sapporo	All cities/towns in Hokkaidō (Note: centering on Sapporo)	
Ehime FC	All cities/towns in Ehime (Note: centering on Matsuyama)	2015 Play-off contestant
Fagiano Okayama	All cities/towns in Okayama (Note: centering on Okayama, Kurashiki, Tsuyama)	
FC Gifu	All cities/towns in Gifu (Note: centering on Gifu)	
Giravanz Kitakyushu	Kitakyushu, Fukuoka	Not eligible for J1 promotion in 2015
Mito HollyHock	Mito, Ibaraki	Not eligible for J1 promotion in 2015
JEF United Chiba	Chiba & Ichihara, Chiba	
Kamatamare Sanuki	Takamatsu, Kagawa	Not eligible for J1 promotion in 2015
Montedio Yamagata	All cities/towns in Yamagata (Note: centering on Yamagata, Tendo, Tsuruoka)	Relegated from J1 League in 2015
Renofa Yamaguchi	All cities/towns in Yamaguchi (Note: centering on Yamaguchi, Shimonoseki, Sanyoonoda, Ube)	Promoted from J3 League in 2015
Roasso Kumamoto	Kumamoto, Kumamoto	
Kyoto Sanga	Southwestern cities/towns in Kyoto (Note: Kyoto, Uji, Joyo, Kyotanabe, Muko, Nagaokakyo, Kizugawa, Kameoka)	
Thespakusatsu Gunma	All cities/towns in Gunma (Note: centering on Kusatsu, Maebashi)	Not eligible for J1 promotion in 2015
Shimizu S-Pulse	Shizuoka, Shizuoka	Relegated from J1 League in 2015
V-Varen Nagasaki	All cities/towns in Nagasaki (Note: centering on Nagasaki, Isahaya)	2015 J2 League Play-off contestant
Tokyo Verdy	All cities/towns in Tokyo	
Tokushima Vortis	All cities/towns in Tokushima (Note: centering on Tokushima, Naruto, Mima, Matsushige, Itano, Aizumi, Kitajima)	
Matsumoto Yamaga	Central cities/towns in Nagano (Note: Matsumoto, Azumino, Yamagata, Shiojiri, Omachi, Ikeda)	Relegated from J1 League in 2015
Yokohama FC	Yokohama, Kanagawa	
Machida Zelvia	Machida, Tokyo	Promoted from J3 League in 2015
Zweigen Kanazawa	Kanazawa, Ishikawa	

=== Managerial changes ===
Team	Outgoing manager	Date of departure	Manner of departure	Incoming manager	Date of announcement
Shimizu S-Pulse	(Japan) Kazuaki Tasaka	25 November 2015	Resigned	(Japan) Shinji Kobayashi	25 November 2015
Tokushima Vortis	(Japan) Shinji Kobayashi	26 November 2015	Contract expired	(Japan) Hiroaki Nagashima	26 November 2015
Yokohama FC	(Japan) Hitoshi Nakata	1 December 2015	Retired from coaching	(Slovenia) Miloš Rus	1 December 2015
Roasso Kumamoto	(Japan) Takeshi Ono	25 November 2015	Contract expired	(Japan) Hiroyuki Kiyokawa	28 December 2015
Yokohama FC	(Slovenia) Miloš Rus	15 June 2016	Resigned	(Japan) Hitoshi Nakata	15 June 2016
FC Gifu	(Japan) Ruy Ramos	22 July 2016	Sacked	(Japan) Megumu Yoshida	22 July 2016
JEF United Ichihara Chiba	(Japan) Takashi Sekizuka	25 July 2016	Sacked	(Japan) Shigetoshi Hasebe	25 July 2016

=== Foreign players ===
Clubs	Player 1	Player 2	Player 3	Asian player	Non-visa foreign	Type-C contract
Cerezo Osaka	(Brazil) Ricardo Santos	(Brazil) Souza	(North Macedonia) Besart Abdurahimi	(South Korea) Kim Jin-hyeon		(South Korea) Ahn Joon-soo
Consadole Sapporo	(Brazil) Julinho	(Brazil) Macedo	(Brazil) Reis	(South Korea) Gu Sung-yun	(Indonesia) Irfan Bachdim	
Ehime FC	(South Korea) Park Kwang-il			(South Korea) Park Chan-yong		
Fagiano Okayama	(China) Wang Jingbin			(South Korea) Kim Jin-kyu		
FC Gifu	(Brazil) Evandro	(Brazil) Leo Mineiro	(Brazil) Leonardo Rocha	(South Korea) Choi Sung-keun		
Giravanz Kitakyushu	(Brazil) Rodrigo					
Mito HollyHock	(Peru) Romero Frank	(South Korea) Yoo Lomon		(South Korea) Song Ju-hun	(Vietnam) Nguyễn Công Phượng	
JEF United Chiba	(Brazil) Élton	(Paraguay) Eduardo Aranda		(South Korea) Lee Joo-young		
Kamatamare Sanuki	(Brazil) Allan	(Brazil) Evson	(Brazil) Miguel	(South Korea) Han Chang-joo		
Montedio Yamagata	(Brazil) Alceu	(Brazil) Diego	(Brazil) Diego Rosa	(South Korea) Lee Je-seung		(South Korea) Koo Bon-hyeok
Renofa Yamaguchi	(Argentina) Luciano Romero			(South Korea) Yoon Sin-young		
Roasso Kumamoto	(Brazil) Anderson			(South Korea) Kim Tae-yeon		
Kyoto Sanga	(Brazil) Andrei Girotto	(Brazil) Daniel Lovinho	(Brazil) Kiros	(South Korea) Lee Yong-jae		
Shimizu S-Pulse	(Australia) Mitchell Duke	(Canada) Dejan Jaković	(South Korea) Kim Byeom-yong	(South Korea) Byeon Jun-byum	(North Korea) Jong Tae-se	
Thespakusatsu Gunma	(Brazil) Lucas Gaúcho	(Brazil) Matheus	(South Korea) Park Gon	(South Korea) Lim Jung-bin	(North Korea) Park Seung-ri	
Tokyo Verdy	(Brazil) Alan Pinheiro	(Brazil) Douglas	(Brazil) Weslley	(South Korea) Lim You-hwan		
V-Varen Nagasaki	(South Korea) Baek Sung-dong	(South Korea) Park Hyung-jin		(South Korea) Cho Min-woo	(North Korea) Ri Yong-jik	
Tokushima Vortis	(Brazil) Alex	(Brazil) Carlinhos	(Cameroon) Achille Emaná	(South Korea) Kim Kyung-jung		
Matsumoto Yamaga	(Brazil) Obina	(Brazil) Paulinho	(Brazil) Willians	(South Korea) Han Seung-hyeon		
Yokohama FC	(Norway) Ibba Laajab	(Slovenia) Rok Štraus	(Vietnam) Nguyễn Tuấn Anh	(South Korea) Na Sung-soo	(North Korea) An Yong-hak	
Zweigen Kanazawa	(Brazil) David	(Brazil) Mendes	(Brazil) Romarinho	(South Korea) Kim Young-heon	(North Korea) An Byong-jun	(South Korea) Kim Tea-sung
Machida Zelvia	(Netherlands) Calvin Jong-a-Pin			(North Korea) Kim Song-gi	(North Korea) Ri Han-jae	

== League table ==
Pos	Team	Pld	W	D	L	GF	GA	GD	Pts	Promotion, qualification or relegation
1	Consadole Sapporo (C, P)	42	25	10	7	65	33	+32	85	Promotion to 2017 J1 League
2	Shimizu S-Pulse (P)	42	25	9	8	85	37	+48	84	Promotion to 2017 J1 League
3	Matsumoto Yamaga	42	24	12	6	62	32	+30	84	Qualification for promotion playoffs (Note: Only teams that meet J1 license criteria can participate in promotion playoffs. If one or more teams fail to meet the criteria, only eligible teams that finished 3rd to 6th will participate and no replacement teams will be added.)
4	Cerezo Osaka (O, P)	42	23	9	10	62	46	+16	78	Qualification for promotion playoffs
5	Kyoto Sanga	42	18	15	9	50	37	+13	69	Qualification for promotion playoffs
6	Fagiano Okayama	42	17	14	11	58	44	+14	65	Qualification for promotion playoffs
7	Machida Zelvia	42	18	11	13	53	44	+9	65	
8	Yokohama FC	42	16	11	15	50	51	−1	59	
9	Tokushima Vortis	42	16	9	17	46	42	+4	57	
10	Ehime FC	42	12	20	10	41	40	+1	56	
11	JEF United Chiba	42	13	14	15	52	53	−1	53	
12	Renofa Yamaguchi	42	14	11	17	55	63	−8	53	
13	Mito HollyHock	42	10	18	14	45	49	−4	48	
14	Montedio Yamagata	42	11	14	17	43	49	−6	47	
15	V-Varen Nagasaki	42	10	17	15	39	51	−12	47	
16	Roasso Kumamoto	42	12	10	20	38	53	−15	46	
17	Thespakusatsu Gunma	42	11	12	19	52	66	−14	45	
18	Tokyo Verdy	42	10	13	19	43	61	−18	43	
19	Kamatamare Sanuki	42	10	13	19	43	62	−19	43	
20	FC Gifu	42	12	7	23	47	71	−24	43	
21	Zweigen Kanazawa (X)	42	8	15	19	36	60	−24	39	Qualification for relegation playoffs (Note: The playoffs and direct exchange between J2 and J3 are subject to eligibility of J2-licensed teams in top 2 of 2016 J3 League.)
22	Giravanz Kitakyushu (R)	42	8	14	20	43	64	−21	38	Relegation to 2017 J3 League

Updated to match(es) played on 20 November 2016. Source: 2016 MEIJI YASUDA J2 LEAGUE League table
Rules for classification: 1) Points; 2) Goal difference; 3) Goals scored
(C) Champions; (O) Play-off winners; (P) Promoted; (R) Relegated; (X) Relegation play-off winner

== Play-offs ==
=== J1 Promotion Playoffs ===
2016 J.League Road To J1 Play-Offs (2016 J1昇格プレーオフ)

Semifinals
3	Matsumoto Yamaga	1
6	Fagiano Okayama	2
4	Cerezo Osaka	1
5	Kyoto Sanga	1

Final
6	Fagiano Okayama	0
4	Cerezo Osaka	1

=== Semifinals ===
27 November 2016
15:30

Matsumoto Yamaga	1–2	Fagiano Okayama
Paulinho 74'	Report	Oshitani 23'; Akamine 90+2'

Matsumotodaira Football Stadium, Matsumoto, Nagano
Attendance: 12,200

27 November 2016
15:30

Cerezo Osaka	1–1	Kyoto Sanga
Kakitani 13'	Report	Arita 90'

Kincho Stadium, Higashisumiyoshi-ku, Osaka
Attendance: 13,922

=== Final ===
4 December 2016
15:35

Fagiano Okayama	0–1	Cerezo Osaka
	Report	Kiyohara 52'

Kincho Stadium, Higashisumiyoshi-ku, Osaka
Attendance: 17,086

Cerezo Osaka was promoted to J1 League.

=== J3 Relegation Playoffs ===
2016 J2/J3 Play-Offs (2016 J2・J3入れ替え戦)

Team 1	Agg.	Team 2	1st leg	2nd leg
Tochigi SC	0–3	Zweigen Kanazawa	0–1	0–2

27 November 2016
12:30

Tochigi SC	0–1	Zweigen Kanazawa
	Report	Koyanagi 89'

Tochigi Green Stadium, Utsunomiya, Tochigi
Attendance: 5,369

4 December 2016
12:30

Zweigen Kanazawa	2–0	Tochigi SC
Nakami 34', 69'	Report

Toyama Athletic Stadium, Toyama, Toyama
Attendance: 7,130

Zweigen Kanazawa remains in J2 League.
Tochigi SC remains in J3 League.

== Positions by round ==
Team \ Round	1	2	3	4	5	6	7	8	9	10	11	12	13	14	15	16	17	18	19	20	21	22	23	24	25	26	27	28	29	30	31	32	33	34	35	36	37	38	39	40	41	42
Consadole Sapporo	17	8	8	6	4	7	3	4	3	2	1	3	1	1	1	1	1	1	1	1	1	1	1	1	1	1	1	1	1	1	1	1	1	1	1	1	1	1	1	1	1	1
Shimizu S-Pulse	13	5	6	11	9	6	9	9	6	4	6	7	9	10	9	9	9	7	8	5	6	6	5	7	6	5	6	5	6	5	5	4	5	5	4	4	3	3	3	3	2	2
Matsumoto Yamaga	17	9	10	14	12	16	14	8	4	6	7	6	6	6	4	3	2	5	3	3	3	2	2	2	2	2	2	2	2	2	2	2	2	2	2	2	2	2	2	2	3	3
Cerezo Osaka	4	3	1	1	2	1	1	1	2	3	2	2	4	4	3	5	5	3	2	2	2	3	3	3	3	3	4	3	4	3	3	3	3	3	3	3	4	4	4	4	4	4
Kyoto Sanga	9	14	13	13	15	12	12	13	14	14	8	9	7	7	5	6	6	4	5	6	5	5	6	4	5	6	5	6	5	6	6	6	6	6	6	6	6	6	6	5	5	5
Fagiano Okayama	9	6	7	5	3	4	7	3	5	7	5	4	5	2	6	4	3	2	4	4	4	4	4	5	4	4	3	4	3	4	4	5	4	4	5	5	5	5	5	6	6	6
Machida Zelvia	17	16	9	7	5	2	2	2	1	1	3	1	2	3	2	2	4	6	6	7	7	7	8	6	7	7	8	8	8	8	9	8	8	7	7	7	7	7	8	7	7	7
Yokohama FC	17	21	22	17	17	13	11	12	13	10	12	8	11	11	11	12	12	14	16	12	14	17	16	15	15	13	11	10	9	10	7	7	7	8	8	8	8	8	7	8	8	8
Tokushima Vortis	15	20	21	21	15	19	19	19	17	18	16	17	14	15	13	15	16	12	14	16	16	12	12	13	10	11	13	13	13	12	12	12	13	12	12	12	11	10	10	9	9	9
Ehime FC	13	15	14	18	18	15	13	14	12	11	13	13	13	14	16	13	13	15	11	13	10	11	11	12	13	12	12	12	12	13	11	11	11	9	9	9	9	9	9	10	10	10
JEF United Chiba	2	10	5	4	7	9	5	6	10	12	11	12	10	8	8	8	8	8	9	9	9	9	9	9	9	9	10	9	10	9	10	10	9	10	10	11	12	12	11	11	11	11
Renofa Yamaguchi	9	7	11	16	13	10	10	10	7	5	4	5	3	5	7	7	7	9	7	8	8	8	7	8	8	8	7	7	7	7	8	9	10	11	11	10	10	11	12	12	12	12
Mito HollyHock	9	16	19	19	21	18	18	18	16	15	15	15	17	13	15	16	14	16	18	17	18	16	14	16	16	14	14	14	15	14	14	14	14	13	14	13	14	14	14	13	13	13
Montedio Yamagata	17	16	18	19	21	22	22	21	20	20	18	16	16	16	14	14	15	10	12	14	11	10	10	11	12	15	16	16	18	18	18	16	16	18	18	16	17	18	18	16	16	14
V-Varen Nagasaki	2	13	12	12	14	17	17	17	19	19	20	21	21	20	19	17	18	19	19	18	17	13	13	10	11	10	9	11	11	11	13	13	12	14	13	14	13	13	13	14	14	15
Roasso Kumamoto	4	3	1	3	1	3	5	7	11	13	14	14	15	18	18	19	17	17	15	11	12	14	15	14	14	17	17	18	14	16	17	18	17	15	15	17	18	15	16	18	15	16
Thespakusatsu Gunma	1	1	4	8	10	11	16	16	18	17	19	19	18	19	20	20	20	20	20	20	21	21	21	22	20	20	19	19	16	15	15	17	18	16	16	15	15	17	17	15	17	17
Tokyo Verdy	4	11	15	9	11	13	15	15	15	16	17	18	20	17	17	18	19	18	17	19	19	19	19	17	18	18	18	15	17	17	16	15	15	17	17	18	16	16	15	17	18	18
Kamatamare Sanuki	4	2	3	2	6	8	4	5	9	8	9	11	12	12	12	10	10	11	13	15	15	18	18	19	17	16	15	17	19	19	19	19	19	19	19	19	19	19	19	20	19	19
FC Gifu	22	22	17	10	8	5	8	11	8	9	10	10	8	9	10	11	11	13	10	10	13	15	17	18	19	19	20	20	20	20	20	20	20	20	20	20	21	22	22	19	20	20
Zweigen Kanazawa	15	19	20	21	20	21	21	22	22	22	22	22	22	22	22	21	21	22	22	22	22	22	22	20	21	21	21	21	21	22	22	22	21	21	21	22	20	20	21	22	22	21
Giravanz Kitakyushu	4	12	16	15	18	20	20	20	21	21	21	20	19	21	21	22	22	21	21	21	20	20	20	21	22	22	22	22	22	21	21	21	22	22	22	21	22	21	20	21	21	22

Last updated: 20 November 2016
Source: J. League Data Site
Note 1: Two games for Matchday 8 (V. Varen Nagasaki vs. Mito HollyHock; Kyoto Sanga FC vs. Roasso Kumamoto) scheduled on 17 April 2016 were affected by the series of earthquakes in Kumamoto prefecture.

- Matchday 8 game between Kyoto Sanga FC and Roasso Kumamoto was rescheduled on 29 June 2016. Result of this match were included on Matchday 21 ranking.
- Matchday 8 game between V. Varen Nagasaki and Mito HollyHock was rescheduled on 7 September 2016. Result of this match were included on Matchday 31 ranking.

Note 2: Matchday 8 schedule for Zweigen Kanazawa vs. Ehime FC, scheduled on 17 April 2016, was postponed due to severe storms in the area. The match was rescheduled on May 18 and results were included on Matchday 14 Ranking.
Note 3: Fixtures of Roasso Kumamoto for Matchdays 9 (Roasso Kumamoto vs. Yokohama FC), 10 (Montedio Yamagata vs. Roasso Kumamoto), 11 (Roasso Kumamoto vs. Ehime FC) and 12 (Consadole Sapporo vs. Roasso Kumamoto) were postponed by the J. League due to series of earthquakes in Kumamoto prefecture.

- Matchday 9 game between Roasso Kumamoto and Yokohama FC was rescheduled on 7 September 2016. Result of this match were included on Matchday 31 ranking.
- Matchday 10 game between Montedio Yamagata and Roasso Kumamoto was rescheduled on 6 July 2016. Result of this match were included on Matchday 22 ranking.
- Matchday 11 game between Roasso Kumamoto and Ehime FC was rescheduled on 31 August 2016. Result of this match were included on Matchday 31 ranking.
- Matchday 12 game between Consadole Sapporo and Roasso Kumamoto was rescheduled on 25 August 2016. Result of this match were included on Matchday 31 ranking.

Leader and qualification for 2017 J1 League
Qualification for 2017 J1 League
Qualification for promotion play-offs
Qualification for relegation play-offs
Relegation to 2017 J3 League

== Results ==
Home \ Away	CER	CON	EHI	FAG	GIF	GIR	HOL	JEF	KAM	MON	REN	ROS	SAN	SSP	SPA	VVN	VER	VOR	YAM	YFC	ZEL	ZWE
Cerezo Osaka		0–0	1–0	2–1	3–2	1–1	2–2	2–1	2–3	2–2	2–4	1–0	0–2	1–2	1–0	2–0	1–0	3–2	0–1	2–3	1–3	2–2
Consadole Sapporo	1–0		1–1	1–0	5–0	1–0	1–0	2–2	4–1	3–1	3–1	1–0	3–1	3–2	3–1	2–1	1–2	1–0	1–0	5–2	3–2	0–0
Ehime FC	0–0	2–2		1–1	0–3	2–1	1–1	2–1	1–0	1–1	1–1	1–0	0–1	2–2	1–0	0–1	0–0	0–2	0–0	3–0	0–1	3–1
Fagiano Okayama	1–1	0–0	2–1		0–1	2–0	1–2	2–1	3–1	0–1	1–0	2–1	2–2	2–2	3–3	0–0	1–1	1–0	2–1	0–1	2–2	1–2
FC Gifu	0–1	0–4	2–1	0–5		1–0	1–0	0–2	1–1	0–1	1–2	2–3	0–1	1–1	2–1	2–4	4–2	1–1	0–2	2–0	1–2	0–1
Giravanz Kitakyushu	0–1	0–0	1–1	1–3	2–1		2–2	0–2	3–0	1–0	0–1	1–1	1–2	1–2	0–3	2–2	2–1	0–1	1–2	0–4	1–3	3–2
Mito HollyHock	0–1	0–1	1–2	2–3	1–0	1–1		1–0	3–2	1–0	0–2	1–1	1–1	0–0	1–0	0–2	1–1	0–3	2–3	1–1	2–2	3–0
JEF United Chiba	3–0	1–2	0–0	2–0	3–2	1–2	0–1		1–1	3–0	1–1	2–0	0–3	3–4	0–0	0–0	2–2	2–1	0–3	1–0	1–1	1–0
Kamatamare Sanuki	2–1	0–1	1–1	0–1	3–2	1–1	1–1	1–1		2–1	0–2	0–0	1–3	1–2	1–3	2–2	2–1	1–2	2–4	1–0	0–1	1–1
Montedio Yamagata	0–1	1–1	2–2	0–1	1–1	3–0	2–2	1–1	2–1		2–1	4–1	0–0	0–1	3–1	1–0	1–0	2–1	0–1	0–0	0–1	0–0
Renofa Yamaguchi	0–2	1–2	1–1	1–1	2–3	5–1	1–0	4–2	1–0	2–2		0–2	1–1	0–4	2–0	0–3	3–1	2–1	0–0	0–2	0–2	0–1
Roasso Kumamoto	1–5	2–0	1–2	0–0	1–0	1–6	0–1	3–0	2–0	0–0	1–2		1–2	0–2	1–1	1–2	1–0	1–0	1–0	0–1	0–2	5–2
Kyoto Sanga	3–3	0–0	0–1	2–0	1–0	0–0	1–1	1–1	1–0	3–2	3–0	1–1		2–1	0–0	0–0	2–0	0–1	1–2	1–0	1–0	0–0
Shimizu S-Pulse	0–2	0–2	0–0	2–1	2–0	2–0	2–1	1–1	2–2	3–1	2–2	4–0	4–1		8–0	2–0	0–1	0–1	0–0	3–0	2–0	4–1
Thespakusatsu Gunma	0–2	0–1	1–2	0–1	4–0	2–2	2–1	2–1	1–2	2–0	2–0	1–1	0–1	0–4		3–0	2–2	0–3	1–1	3–1	2–2	2–1
V-Varen Nagasaki	1–2	0–0	1–1	0–3	2–1	0–0	1–1	1–1	1–2	1–1	2–1	0–2	0–2	0–3	2–2		2–1	1–2	1–1	1–3	1–0	0–0
Tokyo Verdy	1–2	1–0	1–1	2–1	1–1	1–1	0–3	1–1	3–2	0–1	2–2	1–0	2–1	2–1	1–2	0–0		1–0	0–4	0–2	0–1	4–1
Tokushima Vortis	0–1	2–1	2–0	2–3	1–3	1–0	1–0	1–0	0–0	2–2	1–1	0–1	2–1	1–2	1–1	0–0	3–1		2–2	0–3	1–1	0–1
Matsumoto Yamaga	0–1	3–2	1–1	1–1	1–1	2–1	0–0	0–1	0–0	1–0	3–3	1–0	2–0	1–0	2–1	1–0	2–0	1–0		3–2	1–0	4–2
Yokohama FC	1–1	1–0	0–0	0–2	1–2	2–2	1–1	2–1	0–1	2–1	2–0	1–1	2–0	0–2	3–2	2–2	1–1	0–2	0–2		1–0	0–0
Machida Zelvia	0–1	2–0	0–1	1–1	1–1	0–1	3–3	2–3	0–1	2–1	2–3	1–0	1–1	1–2	0–0	1–0	2–1	1–0	2–1	1–1		2–1
Zweigen Kanazawa	1–3	0–1	2–1	1–1	1–2	1–1	0–0	1–2	0–0	1–0	1–0	0–0	1–1	0–3	3–1	1–2	1–1	0–0	0–2	1–2	1–2	

Updated to match(es) played on 20 November 2016. Source: J.League Data
Legend: Blue = home team win; Yellow = draw; Red = away team win.

== Top scorers ==
Rank	Scorer	Club	Goals
1	(North Korea) Jong Tae-se	Shimizu S-Pulse	26
2	(Japan) Ken Tokura	Consadole Sapporo	19
3	(Japan) Genki Omae	Shimizu S-Pulse	18
3	(Norway) Ibba Laajab	Yokohama FC	18
5	(Japan) Ryo Nagai	V-Varen Nagasaki	17
6	(Japan) Kazuki Hara	Giravanz Kitakyushu	16
6	(Japan) Hiroyuki Takasaki	Matsumoto Yamaga	16
8	(Japan) Yuki Nakashima	Machida Zelvia	14
8	(Japan) Kenyu Sugimoto	Cerezo Osaka	14
8	(Japan) Yuki Oshitani	Fagiano Okayama	14
11	(Brazil) Léo Mineiro	FC Gifu	13
11	(Japan) Yusuke Segawa	Thespakusatsu Gunma	13

Updated to games played on 20 November 2016
Source: J.League Data

== Attendances ==
Pos	Team	Total	High	Low	Average	Change
1	Consadole Sapporo	305,732	33,697	8,269	14,559	+21.7%
2	Matsumoto Yamaga	286,246	19,632	10,796	13,631	−19.0%^{†}
3	Cerezo Osaka	262,691	23,781	8,464	12,509	+2.3%
4	Shimizu S-Pulse	236,749	16,740	6,552	11,274	−19.9%^{†}
5	JEF United Chiba	216,127	14,163	7,684	10,292	−4.0%
6	Fagiano Okayama	210,364	15,204	7,050	10,017	+19.1%
7	Renofa Yamaguchi	139,732	14,532	3,629	6,654	+52.4%^{‡}
8	Kyoto Sanga	137,005	12,042	2,884	6,524	−12.9%
9	Montedio Yamagata	131,324	14,450	3,189	6,254	−37.6%^{†}
10	FC Gifu	118,910	12,158	3,215	5,662	−8.4%
11	Roasso Kumamoto	116,402	9,727	2,509	5,543	−21.2%
12	Tokyo Verdy	113,451	9,272	2,752	5,402	−4.6%
13	Mito HollyHock	112,668	10,420	3,815	5,365	+11.4%
14	V-Varen Nagasaki	109,727	9,048	2,692	5,225	+6.0%
15	Machida Zelvia	107,591	10,112	3,448	5,123	+36.0%^{‡}
16	Yokohama FC	102,724	10,524	2,077	4,892	−4.3%
17	Thespakusatsu Gunma	99,619	9,804	2,374	4,744	+15.7%
18	Tokushima Vortis	95,860	9,767	3,218	4,565	−9.0%
19	Zweigen Kanazawa	87,757	9,316	1,924	4,179	−14.9%
20	Ehime FC	85,863	8,215	2,019	4,089	+8.4%
21	Kamatamare Sanuki	77,413	11,376	1,924	3,686	+0.8%
22	Giravanz Kitakyushu	67,698	5,689	1,795	3,224	−6.8%
	League total	3,221,653	33,697	1,795	6,973	+1.9%

Updated to games played on 20 November 2016
Source: J. League Data
Notes:
^{†}from J1^{‡}from J3
