= Masaru Kurotsu =

Japanese footballer (born 1982)

Masaru Kurotsu 黒津 勝
Personal information
- Full name: Masaru Kurotsu
- Date of birth: 20 August 1982 (age 44)
- Place of birth: Koga, Ibaraki, Japan
- Height: 1.79 m (5 ft 10 1/2 in)
- Position: Forward

Team information
- Current team: J.FC Miyazaki
- Number: 34

Youth career
- 1998–2000: Hanasaki Tokuharu High School

Senior career*
Years	Team	Apps	(Gls)
2001–2012	Kawasaki Frontale	174	(30)
2013–2015	Yokohama FC	82	(15)
2016–2017	Gainare Tottori	22	(2)
2018–	J.FC Miyazaki		
Total		278	(47)
Medal record
Kawasaki Frontale
Runner-up	J1 League	2006
Runner-up	J1 League	2008
Runner-up	J1 League	2009
Runner-up	J.League Cup	2007
Runner-up	J.League Cup	2009
- * Club domestic league appearances and goals as of end of 2017 season

Masaru Kurotsu (黒津 勝, Kurotsu Masaru; born 20 August 1982) is a retired Japanese football player. He last played for J.FC Miyazaki.

== Playing career ==
Kurotsu was born in Koga on 20 August 1982. After graduating from high school, he joined J2 League club Kawasaki Frontale in 2001. On August 25, 2002, he debuted as substitute at the 76th minutes against Omiya Ardija and scored a winning goal at the 77th minutes. Although he could hardly play in the match for injury in 2003, he played many matches as substitute forward from summer 2004. Frontale also won the champions in 2004 season and was promoted to J1 League. His opportunity to play increased from 2005 and Frontale won the 2nd place in 2006, 2008 and 2009 season. However he could hardly play in the match for injuries from 2011. In 2013, he moved to J2 club Yokohama FC. He played many matches in 3 seasons. In 2016, he moved to J3 League club Gainare Tottori. In 2018, he moved to Regional Leagues club J.FC Miyazaki.

== Club statistics ==
Club performance			League		Cup		League Cup		Continental		Total	
Season	Club	League	Apps	Goals	Apps	Goals	Apps	Goals	Apps	Goals	Apps	Goals
Japan			League		Emperor's Cup		J.League Cup		Asia		Total	
2001	Kawasaki Frontale	J2 League	0	0	0	0	0	0	-		0	0
2002	Kawasaki Frontale	J2 League	8	1	3	1	-		-		11	2
2003	Kawasaki Frontale	J2 League	1	0	0	0	-		-		1	0
2004	Kawasaki Frontale	J2 League	14	3	3	1	-		-		17	4
2005	Kawasaki Frontale	J1 League	22	3	2	0	4	4	-		28	7
2006	Kawasaki Frontale	J1 League	22	7	1	0	7	3	-		30	10
2007	Kawasaki Frontale	J1 League	28	4	3	0	4	2	3	0	38	6
2008	Kawasaki Frontale	J1 League	26	3	0	0	4	1	-		30	4
2009	Kawasaki Frontale	J1 League	16	1	3	1	4	0	4	1	27	3
2010	Kawasaki Frontale	J1 League	33	8	1	0	4	2	6	1	44	11
2011	Kawasaki Frontale	J1 League	1	0	0	0	0	0	-		1	0
2012	Kawasaki Frontale	J1 League	3	0	0	0	0	0	-		3	0
2013	Yokohama FC	J2 League	22	5	1	0	-		-		23	5
2014	Yokohama FC	J2 League	34	7	1	0	-		-		35	7
2015	Yokohama FC	J2 League	26	3	1	1	-		-		27	4
2016	Gainare Tottori	J3 League	16	2	0	0	-		-		16	2
2017	Gainare Tottori	J3 League	6	0	0	0	-		-		6	0
Career total			278	47	20	4	27	12	13	2	338	65
