= 2015 Yokohama FC season =

Yokohama FC
2015 season
- Manager: Miloš Rus; Hitoshi Nakata
- Stadium: NHK Spring Mitsuzawa Football Stadium
- J2 League: 15th
Home colours	Away colours

2015 Yokohama FC season.

== J2 League ==
=== League table ===
Pos	Team	Pld	W	D	L	GF	GA	GD	Pts
14	Tokushima Vortis	42	13	14	15	35	44	−9	53
15	Yokohama FC	42	13	13	16	33	58	−25	52
16	Kamatamare Sanuki	42	12	15	15	30	33	−3	51

Source: Meiji Yasuda J2 League Standing
Rules for classification: 1) Points; 2) Goal difference; 3) Goals scored

=== Match details ===
J2 League match details
Match	Date	Team	Score	Team	Venue	Attendance
1	2015.03.08	Thespakusatsu Gunma	0-1	Yokohama FC	Shoda Shoyu Stadium Gunma	11,198
2	2015.03.15	Yokohama FC	1-1	Tochigi SC	NHK Spring Mitsuzawa Football Stadium	6,794
3	2015.03.20	Zweigen Kanazawa	1-2	Yokohama FC	Ishikawa Athletics Stadium	4,652
4	2015.03.29	Cerezo Osaka	2-0	Yokohama FC	Yanmar Stadium Nagai	14,518
5	2015.04.01	Yokohama FC	2-2	Avispa Fukuoka	NHK Spring Mitsuzawa Football Stadium	2,208
6	2015.04.05	Yokohama FC	2-3	Júbilo Iwata	NHK Spring Mitsuzawa Football Stadium	5,921
7	2015.04.11	Roasso Kumamoto	0-1	Yokohama FC	Umakana-Yokana Stadium	7,040
8	2015.04.19	Yokohama FC	2-2	V-Varen Nagasaki	NHK Spring Mitsuzawa Football Stadium	3,849
9	2015.04.26	Yokohama FC	1-1	Tokushima Vortis	NHK Spring Mitsuzawa Football Stadium	6,660
10	2015.04.29	Tokyo Verdy	0-1	Yokohama FC	Ajinomoto Stadium	5,629
11	2015.05.03	JEF United Chiba	3-0	Yokohama FC	Fukuda Denshi Arena	13,909
12	2015.05.06	Yokohama FC	1-2	Kamatamare Sanuki	NHK Spring Mitsuzawa Football Stadium	4,357
13	2015.05.09	Oita Trinita	1-1	Yokohama FC	Oita Bank Dome	7,246
14	2015.05.17	Yokohama FC	1-0	Giravanz Kitakyushu	NHK Spring Mitsuzawa Football Stadium	9,663
15	2015.05.24	Fagiano Okayama	0-0	Yokohama FC	City Light Stadium	9,302
16	2015.05.31	Ehime FC	3-0	Yokohama FC	Ningineer Stadium	3,419
17	2015.06.06	Yokohama FC	3-2	FC Gifu	NHK Spring Mitsuzawa Football Stadium	5,432
18	2015.06.14	Kyoto Sanga FC	1-2	Yokohama FC	Kyoto Nishikyogoku Athletic Stadium	14,811
19	2015.06.21	Yokohama FC	0-3	Omiya Ardija	NHK Spring Mitsuzawa Football Stadium	4,777
20	2015.06.28	Mito HollyHock	0-1	Yokohama FC	K's denki Stadium Mito	5,486
21	2015.07.04	Yokohama FC	0-0	Consadole Sapporo	NHK Spring Mitsuzawa Football Stadium	6,422
22	2015.07.08	Yokohama FC	0-0	Cerezo Osaka	NHK Spring Mitsuzawa Football Stadium	3,728
23	2015.07.12	FC Gifu	0-1	Yokohama FC	Gifu Nagaragawa Stadium	7,532
24	2015.07.18	Yokohama FC	0-3	Roasso Kumamoto	NHK Spring Mitsuzawa Football Stadium	7,506
25	2015.07.22	Omiya Ardija	3-0	Yokohama FC	NACK5 Stadium Omiya	9,737
26	2015.07.26	Yokohama FC	0-2	Mito HollyHock	NHK Spring Mitsuzawa Football Stadium	3,229
27	2015.08.01	V-Varen Nagasaki	2-0	Yokohama FC	Nagasaki Stadium	6,496
28	2015.08.08	Yokohama FC	1-6	Tokyo Verdy	NHK Spring Mitsuzawa Football Stadium	5,321
29	2015.08.15	Tochigi SC	2-1	Yokohama FC	Tochigi Green Stadium	5,891
30	2015.08.23	Yokohama FC	0-1	JEF United Chiba	NHK Spring Mitsuzawa Football Stadium	5,814
31	2015.09.12	Consadole Sapporo	2-0	Yokohama FC	Sapporo Dome	10,840
32	2015.09.20	Yokohama FC	2-1	Zweigen Kanazawa	NHK Spring Mitsuzawa Football Stadium	3,186
33	2015.09.23	Tokushima Vortis	0-0	Yokohama FC	Pocarisweat Stadium	4,876
34	2015.09.27	Yokohama FC	2-1	Ehime FC	NHK Spring Mitsuzawa Football Stadium	4,510
35	2015.10.04	Giravanz Kitakyushu	3-1	Yokohama FC	Honjo Stadium	4,455
36	2015.10.10	Kamatamare Sanuki	1-1	Yokohama FC	Pikara Stadium	2,595
37	2015.10.18	Yokohama FC	0-0	Kyoto Sanga FC	NHK Spring Mitsuzawa Football Stadium	7,464
38	2015.10.25	Yokohama FC	0-0	Fagiano Okayama	Ajinomoto Field Nishigaoka	2,568
39	2015.11.01	Avispa Fukuoka	4-0	Yokohama FC	Level5 Stadium	16,776
40	2015.11.08	Yokohama FC	1-0	Oita Trinita	NHK Spring Mitsuzawa Football Stadium	3,518
41	2015.11.14	Júbilo Iwata	0-0	Yokohama FC	Yamaha Stadium	13,576
42	2015.11.23	Yokohama FC	1-0	Thespakusatsu Gunma	NHK Spring Mitsuzawa Football Stadium	4,437
