= Lee Joo-young =

Lee Joo-young (이주영) may refer to:

- Lee Joo-young (actress, born 1987), South Korean actress
- Lee Joo-young (actress, born 1992), South Korean actress
- Lee Tae-ho (footballer, born 1991) (born 1991), South Korean football/soccer player born Lee Joo-young
