= 2025 Seoul EOU Cup =

2025 서울 EOU컵 (in Korean)

Tournament details
- Host country: South Korea
- Dates: 20–28 September
- Teams: 8 (from 6 confederations)
- Venue: 1 (in 1 host city)

Final positions
- Champions: (South Korea) K League Youth (1st title)
- Runners-up: (South Korea) Seoul FA
- Third place: (Japan) Kanto University
- Fourth place: (Thailand) Buriram United U18

Tournament statistics
- Matches played: 14
- Goals scored: 58 (4.14 per match)
- Top scorer(s): (South Korea) Lee Ho-jin (South Korea) Lee Yong-jae (4 goals each)

The 2025 Seoul EOU Cup (Korean: 2025 서울 EOU컵) was the 3rd edition of the Seoul Cup organized by Seoul Football Association and Korea Sports Agent Association, an youth under-18 association football tournament held at the Seoul World Cup Auxiliary Stadium, a small stadium next to the bigger stadium, in Seoul, South Korea from 20 to 28 September 2025.

== Participating teams ==
Here are the 8 teams participated from the Seoul EOU Cup this season:

Country	Team
South Korea	Seoul FA
South Korea	K League Youth
South Korea	Gangneung Jungang High School
Vietnam	Vietnam U18
Japan	Kanto University
Malaysia	Johor Darul Ta'zim U18
China	Zhejiang Professional U18
Thailand	Buriram United U18

== Venues ==
Seoul
Seoul World Cup Auxiliary Stadium
Capacity: 1,012
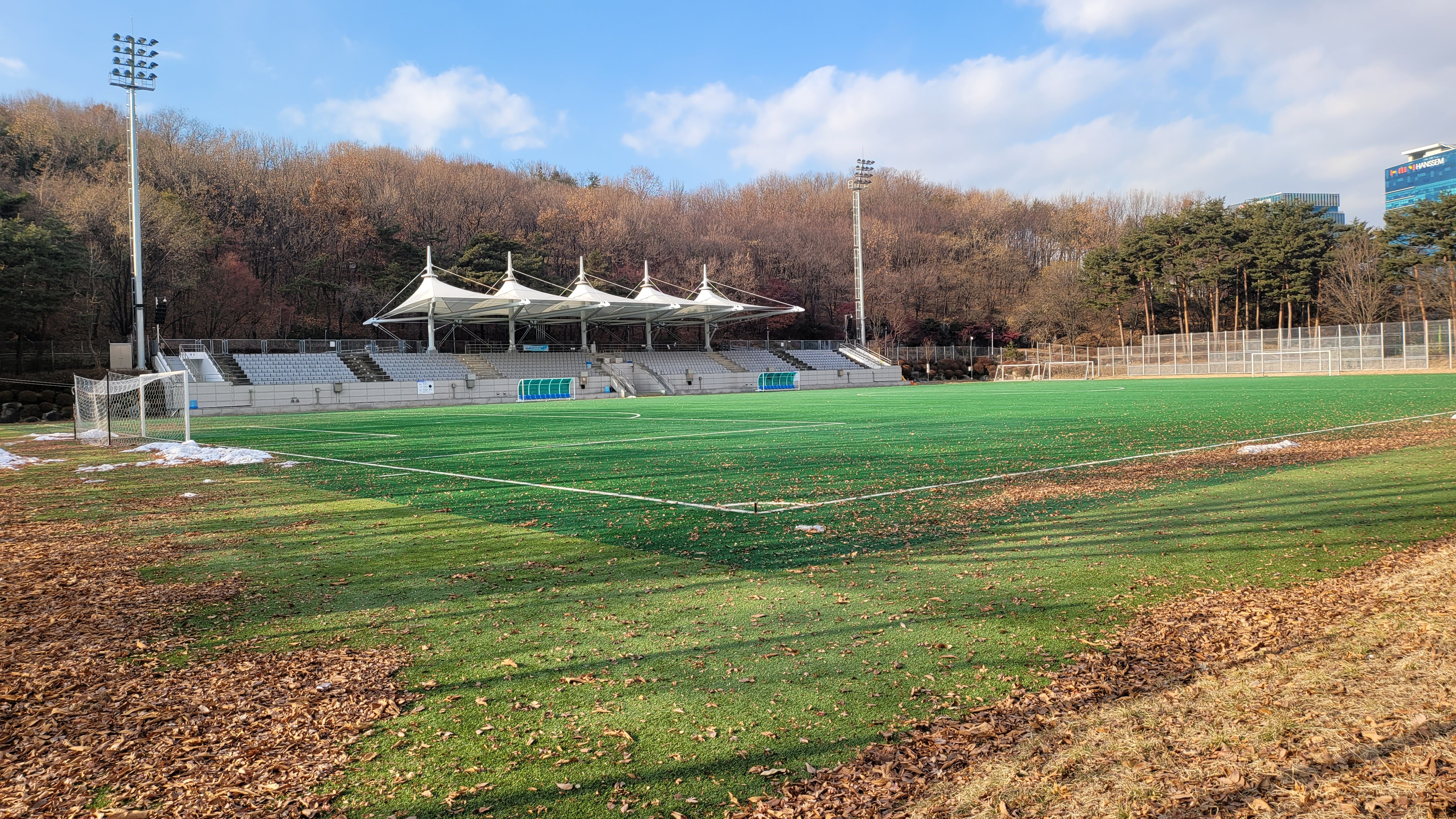
2025 Seoul EOU Cup (South Korea)

== Group stage ==
All times are local, KST (UTC+9).

=== Group A ===
Pos	Team	Pld	W	D	L	GF	GA	GD	Pts	Qualification
1	(South Korea) K League Youth	3	2	1	0	9	3	+6	7	Advance to the final match
2	(Japan) Kanto University	3	2	0	1	7	4	+3	6	Advance to the third place match
3	Vietnam U18	3	1	0	2	5	6	−1	3	
4	(China) Zhejiang U18	3	0	1	2	2	10	−8	1	

Source: Instagram
Rules for classification: 1) Points; 2) Goal difference; 3) Goals scored; 4) Head-to-head result; 5) Fair play ranking.
20 September 2025
16:00

Zhejiang U18 (China)	1–5	(Japan) Kanto University
Huang Guosen 58'	Report	Kasuya 7', 63'; Sakuto 38'; Hideki 41'; Seiya 88'

Seoul World Cup Auxiliary Stadium, Seoul
20 September 2025
19:00

K League Youth (South Korea)	5–1	Vietnam U18
Lee Ho-jin 7', 36', 60'; Lee Yong-jae 88'; Lee Hwan-hee 78'	Report	Đào Quang Anh 24'

Seoul World Cup Auxiliary Stadium, Seoul

22 September 2025
16:00

Kanto University (Japan)	1–0	Vietnam U18
Fukumotto 46'	Report

Seoul World Cup Auxiliary Stadium, Seoul
22 September 2025
19:00

Zhejiang U18 (China)	1–1	(South Korea) K League Youth
Su Zeming 79'	Report	Lee Ho-jin 90+4'

Seoul World Cup Auxiliary Stadium, Seoul

24 September 2025
16:00

Zhejiang U18 (China)	0–4	Vietnam U18
	Report	Nguyễn Thiên Phú 6'; Đậu Hồng Phong 23'; Nguyễn Lê Phát 62'; Nguyễn Thành Long 81'

Seoul World Cup Auxiliary Stadium, Seoul
24 September 2025
19:00

K League Youth (South Korea)	3–1	(Japan) Kanto University
Yang Min-hyuk 45', 90+4'; Lee Hwan-hee 65'	Report	Kelly 78'

Seoul World Cup Auxiliary Stadium, Seoul

=== Group B ===
Pos	Team	Pld	W	D	L	GF	GA	GD	Pts	Qualification
1	(South Korea) Seoul FA	3	2	0	1	12	5	+7	6	Advance to the final match
2	(Thailand) Buriram United U18	3	2	0	1	7	8	−1	6	Advance to the third place match
3	(South Korea) Gangneung Jungang High School	3	1	1	1	4	5	−1	4	
4	(Malaysia) Johor Darul Ta'zim U18	3	0	1	2	3	8	−5	1	

Source: Instagram
Rules for classification: 1) Points; 2) Goal difference; 3) Goals scored; 4) Head-to-head result; 5) Fair play ranking.
21 September 2025
16:00

Gangneung Jungang High School (South Korea)	1–3	(Thailand) Buriram United U18
Lee Eon-min 44'	Report	Rattanasuwan 2', 55'; Kaiwakamonchat 46'

Seoul World Cup Auxiliary Stadium, Seoul
21 September 2025
19:00

Seoul FA (South Korea)	5–1	(Malaysia) Johor Darul Ta'zim U18
Jo Jeong-hyeon 4'; Oh Yun-Taek 14'; Hong Dong-Hyeon 56'; Oh Seong-ju 65', 78'	Report	Muhammed Fahmi 26'

Seoul World Cup Auxiliary Stadium, Seoul

23 September 2025
16:00

Gangneung Jungang High School (South Korea)	0–0	(Malaysia) Johor Darul Ta'zim U18
	Report

Seoul World Cup Auxiliary Stadium, Seoul
23 September 2025
19:00

Seoul FA (South Korea)	5–1	(Thailand) Buriram United U18
Lee Yeong-jin 8', 46'; Hong Dong-hyeon 14'; Lee Cha-min 86'; Jeong Ji-won 89'	Report	Nathakorn 69'

Seoul World Cup Auxiliary Stadium, Seoul

25 September 2025
16:00

Buriram United U18 (Thailand)	3–2	(Malaysia) Johor Darul Ta'zim U18
Phanuwit 13', 56'; Surawee 59'	Report	Aisy Mirza 37'; Mohammad Fadhlul 65'

Seoul World Cup Auxiliary Stadium, Seoul
25 September 2025
19:00

Seoul FA (South Korea)	2–3	(South Korea) Gangneung Jungang High School
Jo Jeong-Hyeon 9'; Jeong Hui-Seung 71'	Report	Seo Ji-hwan 13'; Kang Do-yeon 67'; Pyeon Je-won 70'

Seoul World Cup Auxiliary Stadium, Seoul

== Knockout stage ==
All times are local, KST (UTC+9).

=== Bracket ===
Final
28 September — Seoul
(South Korea) Seoul FA	2 (4)
(South Korea) K League Youth	2 (5)
Third place play-off
28 September — Seoul
(Thailand) Buriram United U18	0
(Japan) Kanto University	5

=== Third place play-off ===
28 September 2025
16:00

Buriram United U18 (Thailand)	0–5	(Japan) Kanto University
	Report	Umi 26'; Haru 58'; Kasuya 68', 75'; Sakuto 84'

Seoul World Cup Auxiliary Stadium, Seoul

=== Final ===
28 September 2025
19:00

Seoul FA (South Korea)	2–2 (a.e.t.)	(South Korea) K League Youth
Kim Beom-gi 21'; Won Tae-hun 117'	Report	Lee Yong-jae 58', 120'
Penalties
Oh Seong-ju (penalty scored); Byun Jeong-woo (penalty scored); Noh Yeong-jun (penalty missed); Baek Kyung (penalty scored); Lee Young-jin (penalty scored)	4–5	(penalty scored) Lee Ho-jin; (penalty scored) Kim Min-seo; (penalty scored) Won Tae-hoon; (penalty scored) Lee Ho-in; (penalty scored) Yang Min-hyeok

Seoul World Cup Auxiliary Stadium, Seoul

== Goalscorers ==
There were 58 goals scored in 14 matches, for an average of 4.14 goals per match.

4 goals

- (South Korea) Lee Ho-jin
- (South Korea) Lee Yong-jae

3 goals

- (Thailand) Nathakorn Rattanasuwan
- (Japan) Kasuya Yu

2 goals

- (South Korea) Oh Seong-ju
- (South Korea) Yang Min-hyuk
- (South Korea) Lee Yeong-jin
- (South Korea) Hong Dong-Hyeon
- (South Korea) Jo Jeong-hyeon
- (Japan) Hamba Sakuto

1 goal

- (China) Huang Guosen
- (Japan) Saito Hideki
- (Japan) Hara Seiya
- (South Korea) Lee Hwan-hee
- (Vietnam) Đào Quang Anh
- (South Korea) Lee Eon-min
- (Thailand) Thanakorn Kaiwakamonchat
- (Malaysia) Muhammed Fahmi
- (South Korea) Oh Yun-Taek
- (China) Su Zeming
- (Japan) Fukumotto Itta
- (Vietnam) Nguyễn Thiên Phú
- (Vietnam) Đậu Hồng Phong
- (Vietnam) Nguyễn Lê Phát
- (Vietnam) Nguyễn Thành Long
- (South Korea) Lee Hwan-hee
- (South Korea) Lee Cha-min
- (South Korea) Jeong Ji-won
- (Thailand) Phanuwit Jeyakom
- (Thailand) Surawee Rodma
- (Malaysia) Aisy Mirza Bin Azri
- (Malaysia) Mohammad Fadhlul
- (South Korea) Jeong Hui-Seung
- (South Korea) Seo Ji-hwan
- (South Korea) Kang Do-yeon
- (South Korea) Pyeon Je-won
- (Japan) Kajisa Umi
- (Japan) Ishii Haru
- (South Korea) Kim Beom-gi
- (South Korea) Won Tae-hun
