= Ikeuchi =

Ikeuchi (written: 池内) is a Japanese surname. Notable people with the surname include:

- Hiroyuki Ikeuchi (池内 博之, born 1976), Japanese actor
- Saori Ikeuchi (池内 さおり, born 1982), Japanese politician
- Tomohiko Ikeuchi (池内 友彦, born 1977), Japanese footballer
- Yutaka Ikeuchi (池内 豊, born 1961), Japanese footballer
