= Yutaka Azuma =

Japanese footballer and manager

Yutaka Azuma 東 泰
Personal information
- Full name: Yutaka Azuma
- Date of birth: September 21, 1967 (age 59)
- Place of birth: Tokushima, Tokushima, Japan
- Height: 1.67 m (5 ft 5 1/2 in)
- Position: Midfielder

Youth career
- 1983–1985: Tokushima Commercial High School

Senior career*
Years	Team	Apps	(Gls)
1986–1992	Toyota Motors		

Managerial career
- 2006: Tokushima Vortis
- * Club domestic league appearances and goals

Yutaka Azuma (東 泰, Azuma Yutaka; born September 21, 1967) is a former Japanese football player and manager.

== Playing career ==
Azuma was born in Tokushima on September 21, 1967. After graduating from high school, he played for Toyota Motors from 1986 to 1992.

== Coaching career ==
After retirement, in 1995, Azuma became a coach at his local club Otsuka Pharmaceutical (later Tokushima Vortis). In September 2006, he was promoted to a manager as Shinji Tanaka successor. End of season, he resigned.

== Club statistics ==
Club performance			League		Cup		League Cup		Total	
Season	Club	League	Apps	Goals	Apps	Goals	Apps	Goals	Apps	Goals
Japan			League		Emperor's Cup		J.League Cup		Total	
1986/87	Toyota Motors	JSL Division 2								
1987/88	Toyota Motors	JSL Division 1								
1988/89	Toyota Motors	JSL Division 2								
1989/90	Toyota Motors	JSL Division 2								
1990/91	Toyota Motors	JSL Division 1	4	0			2	0	6	0
1991/92	Toyota Motors	JSL Division 1	0	0			0	0	0	0
Country	Japan		4	0	0	0	2	0	6	0
Total			4	0	0	0	2	0	6	0

== Managerial statistics ==
Team	From	To	Record				
Team	From	To	G	W	D	L	Win %
Tokushima Vortis	2006	2006	9	2	3	4	22.22
Total			9	2	3	4	22.22
