= Alan Pinheiro =

Brazilian footballer (born 1992)

Personal information
- Full name: Alan Lopes Pinheiro
- Date of birth: 13 May 1992 (age 34)
- Place of birth: Brumado, Brazil
- Height: 1.80 m (5 ft 11 in)
- Position: Forward

Senior career*
Years	Team	Apps	(Gls)
2012–2015	Vitória	12	(0)
2013	→ Ceará (loan)	1	(0)
2013	→ Kawasaki Frontale (loan)	10	(0)
2014	→ ASA (loan)	5	(0)
2015	→ Tokyo Verdy (loan)	31	(3)
2016–2018	Tokyo Verdy	92	(26)
2019–2021	JEF United Chiba	51	(5)
2021	Londrina	1	(0)
2023	Maguary	11	(3)
2024	Pevidém	10	(1)
Total		223	(38)
- * Club domestic league appearances and goals

Alan Lopes Pinheiro (アラン・ピニェイロ, born 13 May 1992) is a Brazilian former professional footballer who played as a forward.

== Club statistics ==
Appearances and goals by club, season and competition
Club	Season	League			State League (Note: Includes Campeonato Baiano and Campeonato Pernambucano)		National cup (Note: Includes Copa do Brasil and Emperors Cup)		League cup (Note: Includes J.League Cup)		Other		Total	
Club	Season	Division	Apps	Goals	Apps	Goals	Apps	Goals	Apps	Goals	Apps	Goals	Apps	Goals
Vitória	2012	Série A	0	0	2	0	0	0	–		–		2	0
Vitória	2013	Série A	0	0	2	0	0	0	–		4 (Note: Appearances in Copa do Nordeste)	1	6	1
Vitória	2014	Série A	1	0	7	0	1	1	–		5	1	14	2
Vitória	Total		1	0	11	0	1	1	0	0	9	2	22	3
Ceará (loan)	2013	Série B	1	0	0	0	0	0	–		–		1	0
Kawasaki Frontale (loan)	2013	J.League Division 1	10	0	–		2	2	2	0	–		14	2
ASA (loan)	2014	Série C	5	0	0	0	0	0	–		–		5	0
Tokyo Verdy (loan)	2015	J2 League	31	3	–		2	1	–		0	0	33	4
Tokyo Verdy	2016	J2 League	25	3	–		2	0	–		0	0	27	3
Tokyo Verdy	2017	J2 League	39	17	–		0	0	–		1 (Note: Appearance in J1/J2 play-offs)	0	40	17
Tokyo Verdy	2018	J2 League	27	6	–		2	0	–		0	0	29	6
Tokyo Verdy	Total		91	26	0	0	4	0	0	0	1	0	96	26
JEF United Chiba	2019	J2 League	26	2	–		1	0	–		–		27	2
JEF United Chiba	2020	J2 League	25	3	–		0	0	–		–		25	3
JEF United Chiba	Total		51	5	0	0	1	0	0	0	0	0	52	5
Londrina	2021	Série B	1	0	0	0	0	0	–		–		1	0
Maguary	2023	Campeonato Pernambucano	0	0	11	3	0	0	–		–		11	3
Pevidém	2023–24	Campeonato de Portugal	10	1	–		0	0	–		–		10	1
Career total			201	35	22	3	10	4	2	0	10	2	245	44

== Honours ==
Esporte Clube Vitória

- Campeonato Baiano (1): 2013
- Campeonato Baiano Runners-Up (1): 2012

Copa do Brasil Sub-20 (1)
