= Yutaka Ikeuchi =

Japanese footballer and manager

Yutaka Ikeuchi 池内 豊
Personal information
- Full name: Yutaka Ikeuchi
- Date of birth: 25 August 1961 (age 65)
- Place of birth: Aichi, Japan
- Height: 1.75 m (5 ft 9 in)
- Position: Defender

Youth career
- 1977–1979: Aichi High School

Senior career*
Years	Team	Apps	(Gls)
1980	Toyoda Automatic Loom Works		
1981–1993	Fujita Industries		

International career
1983–1985	Japan	8	(0)

Managerial career
- 2007–2011: Japan U17
- 2025–: Vietnam U20
Medal record
Fujita Industries
Winner	Japan Soccer League	1981
Runner-up	Emperor's Cup	1982
Runner-up	Emperor's Cup	1985
Runner-up	Emperor's Cup	1988
- * Club domestic league appearances and goals

Yutaka Ikeuchi (池内 豊, Ikeuchi Yutaka; born 25 August 1961) is a former Japanese football player and manager who is currently the head coach of the Vietnam national under-20 team. He appeared 8 times for the Japan national team between 1983 and 1985.

== Club career ==
Ikeuchi was born in Aichi Prefecture on 25 August 1961. After graduating from high school, he joined his local club, the Toyoda Automatic Loom Works in 1980. In 1981, he moved to the Japan Soccer League club Fujita Industries. In 1981, the club won the championship of the Japan Soccer League. In 1990, the club was relegated to Division 2. In 1992, the club won the championship in Division 2 and joined the new Japan Football League. In 1993, the club won the championship and was promoted to the J1 League, which started in 1994. However, he retired in 1993, and never played in the J.League.

== National team career ==
On 12 February 1983, Ikeuchi debuted for Japan national team against Syria. He played at 1984 Summer Olympics qualification and 1986 World Cup qualification. He played 8 games for Japan until 1985.

== Coaching career ==
In 2007, Ikeuchi became the manager for Japan U-17 national team. He managed at 2009 U-17 World Cup.

In February 2025, he was appointed as the technical advisor for the Vietnam U-17 national team. He was later named as the head coach of Vietnam U-20 in August 2025 for the 2025 Seoul EOU Cup.

== Club statistics ==
Club performance			League		Cup		League Cup		Total	
Season	Club	League	Apps	Goals	Apps	Goals	Apps	Goals	Apps	Goals
Japan			League		Emperor's Cup		J.League Cup		Total	
1980	Toyoda Automatic Loom Works	Prefectural Leagues								
1981	Fujita Industries	JSL Division 1								
1982	Fujita Industries	JSL Division 1								
1983	Fujita Industries	JSL Division 1								
1984	Fujita Industries	JSL Division 1								
1985/86	Fujita Industries	JSL Division 1	11	0					11	0
1986/87	Fujita Industries	JSL Division 1	17	1					17	1
1987/88	Fujita Industries	JSL Division 1	8	0					8	0
1988/89	Fujita Industries	JSL Division 1								
1989/90	Fujita Industries	JSL Division 1	18	0			3	0	21	0
1990/91	Fujita Industries	JSL Division 2	26	2			0	0	26	2
1991/92	Fujita Industries	JSL Division 2	20	0			3	0	23	0
1992	Fujita Industries	Football League								
1993	Fujita Industries	Football League								
Total			100	3	0	0	6	0	106	3

== National team statistics ==
Japan national team
Year	Apps	Goals
1983	3	0
1984	1	0
1985	4	0
Total	8	0
