= Boris Tatar =

Montenegrin footballer (born 1993)

Personal information
- Date of birth: 17 March 1993 (age 33)
- Place of birth: Podgorica, FR Yugoslavia
- Height: 1.83 m (6 ft 0 in)
- Position: Defender

Youth career
- 1999–2010: Budućnost Podgorica

Senior career*
Years	Team	Apps	(Gls)
2010–2013	Budućnost Podgorica	1	(0)
2011–2012	→ Kom (loan)	23	(3)
2012–2013	→ Mladost Podgorica (loan)	17	(1)
2013–2014	Bentleigh Greens	12	(0)
2015	Zabjelo	5	(0)
2015	Ekenäs	22	(2)
2016	Lahti	21	(2)
2017	Machida Zelvia	0	(0)
2019	Otrant	6	(1)
2019–2020	OFK Titograd		
2020	Budućnost Dobanovci	2	(0)

International career
2009	Montenegro U17	9	(0)
2010–2012	Montenegro U19	18	(0)
2012–2013	Montenegro U21	4	(0)
- * Club domestic league appearances and goals as of 13:02, 9 August 2019 (UTC)

Boris Tatar (born March 17, 1993) is a Montenegrin footballer who most recently played as a defender for Budućnost Dobanovci.

== Club career ==
Tatar started his career in his native Montenegro, going through youth ranks of the biggest club in Montenegro Budućnost Podgorica before turning out on loan for FK Kom and Mladost Podgorica before moving to Australia to join NPL Victoria side Bentleigh Greens, where he made 12 appearances. Owing to difficulties in obtaining new Australian visa and limiting the number of foreign players in NPL Victoria he was forced to return to Montenegro to play for FK Zabjelobefore moving once more to Finland, where he played for Ekenäs Sport Club and Lahti.

He joined Japanese side Machida Zelvia in early 2017.

In season 2018/19, he returned to Montenegro playing for FK Otrant. On 21 June 2019, Tatar joined OFK Titograd.
