= Lee Yong-jae =

South Korean footballer (born 1991)

Lee Yong-jae 이용재
Personal information
- Full name: Lee Yong-jae
- Date of birth: 8 June 1991 (age 35)
- Place of birth: Gwangju, South Korea
- Height: 1.86 m (6 ft 1 in)
- Position: Forward

Youth career
- 2007–2009: Pohang Jecheol; Technical High School
- 2007–2008: Watford (KFA Youth Project)
- 2009–2010: Nantes

Senior career*
Years	Team	Apps	(Gls)
2010–2013	Nantes	50	(5)
2012–2013	Nantes II	14	(5)
2013–2014	Red Star	29	(4)
2014–2015	V-Varen Nagasaki	51	(10)
2016–2017	Kyoto Sanga	65	(11)
2018–2021	Fagiano Okayama	91	(27)
2022	Incheon United	21	(1)
2023–2024	Jeonnam Dragons	9	(3)
2024	FC Gifu	19	(1)

International career
2005–2008	South Korea U17	15	(7)
2011	South Korea U20	4	(0)
2011–2014	South Korea U23	8	(1)
2015	South Korea	4	(1)
Medal record
Representing South Korea
Asian Games
Gold medal – first place	2014 Incheon	Team
- * Club domestic league appearances and goals

- Lee Yong-jae
- Hangul: 이용재
- Hanja: 李龍在
- RR: I Yongjae
- MR: I Yongjae

Lee Yong-jae (Korean: 이용재; born 8 June 1991) is a South Korean former footballer.

== Club career ==
Lee began his career with Pohang Jecheol Technical High School and, after the 2007 FIFA U-17 World Cup, left for Europe signing with Watford through KFA Youth Project. On 6 September 2009 the French club FC Nantes signed the South Korean forward from Watford FC U-18 to a four-year deal. Prior to joining the French side, Lee went on trial with Willem II Tilburg. Lee scored his first goal for FC Nantes against Châteauroux on 22 October 2010.

== International career ==
Lee represented his homeland at 2007 FIFA U-17 World Cup in his native South Korea and played one game. He also played for the South Korea national under-20 football team.

== Career statistics ==
=== Club ===
As of 5 October 2019

Appearances and goals by club, season and competition
Club	Season	League			National Cup		League Cup		Total	
Club	Season	Division	Apps	Goals	Apps	Goals	Apps	Goals	Apps	Goals
Nantes	2010–11	Ligue 2	26	2	5	2	0	0	31	4
Nantes	2011–12	Ligue 2	3	0	1	0	1	0	5	0
Nantes	2012–13	Ligue 2	10	1	3	0	1	0	14	1
Nantes	Total		39	3	9	2	2	0	50	5
Nantes II	2012–13	National 3	14	5	—		—		14	5
Red Star	2013–14	National	29	4	0	0	—		29	4
V-Varen Nagasaki	2014	J2 League	14	3	0	0	—		14	3
V-Varen Nagasaki	2015	J2 League	36	6	1	0	—		36	7
V-Varen Nagasaki	Total		50	9	1	0	—		51	9
Kyoto Sanga	2016	J2 League	34	7	1	0	—		35	7
Kyoto Sanga	2017	J2 League	30	4	0	0	—		30	4
Kyoto Sanga	Total		64	11	1	0	—		65	11
Fagiano Okayama	2018	J2 League	11	1	0	0	—		11	1
Fagiano Okayama	2019	J2 League	35	18			—		35	18
Fagiano Okayama	Total		46	19	0	0	—		46	19
Career total			242	51	11	2	2	0	255	53

=== International goals ===
Scores and results list South Korea's goal tally first, score column indicates score after each Lee goal.

List of international goals scored by Lee Yong-jae
No.	Date	Venue	Opponent	Score	Result	Competition
1	11 June 2015	Shah Alam Stadium, Kuala Lumpur	United Arab Emirates	2–0	3–0	Friendly

== Honours ==
=== International ===
South Korea U23

- Asian Games: 2014

South Korea

- EAFF East Asian Cup: 2015
