= 2016 Gainare Tottori season =

Gainare Tottori
2016 season
- Manager: Tetsuji Hashiratani
- Stadium: Tottori Bank Bird Stadium
- J3 League: 15th

Japanese football team Gainare Tottori's 2016 season.

== Competitions ==
=== Emperor's Cup ===
Beat Fagiano Okayama Next in the first round.
Lost to Omiya Ardija in the 2nd round.

== J3 League ==
=== League table ===
| Pos | Team | Pld | W | D | L | GF | GA | GD | Pts |
|---|---|---|---|---|---|---|---|---|---|
| 12 | Cerezo Osaka U-23 | 30 | 8 | 8 | 14 | 38 | 47 | −9 | 32 |
| 13 | Grulla Morioka | 30 | 6 | 12 | 12 | 43 | 47 | −4 | 30 |
| 14 | Fukushima United | 30 | 7 | 9 | 14 | 35 | 44 | −9 | 30 |
| 15 | Gainare Tottori | 30 | 8 | 6 | 16 | 30 | 47 | −17 | 30 |
| 16 | YSCC Yokohama | 30 | 5 | 5 | 20 | 15 | 51 | −36 | 20 |

Updated to match(es) played on 20 November 2016. Source: 2016 MEIJI YASUDA J3 LEAGUE League table
Rules for classification: 1) Points; 2) Goal difference; 3) Goals scored; 4th) head-to-head results; 5th) disciplinary points; 6th) draw

=== Match details ===
J3 League match details
| Match | Date | Team | Score | Team | Venue | Attendance |
|---|---|---|---|---|---|---|
| 1 | 2016.03.13 | Tochigi SC | 0-0 | Gainare Tottori | Tochigi Green Stadium | 5,644 |
| 2 | 2016.03.20 | Gainare Tottori | 1-1 | Blaublitz Akita | Tottori Bank Bird Stadium | 2,645 |
| 3 | 2016.04.03 | Oita Trinita | 2-1 | Gainare Tottori | Oita Bank Dome | 7,532 |
| 4 | 2016.04.10 | Gainare Tottori | 0-1 | Kagoshima United FC | Tottori Bank Bird Stadium | 1,653 |
| 6 | 2016.04.24 | Gainare Tottori | 0-1 | FC Tokyo U-23 | Tottori Bank Bird Stadium | 1,464 |
| 7 | 2016.05.01 | AC Nagano Parceiro | 0-0 | Gainare Tottori | Minami Nagano Sports Park Stadium | 5,440 |
| 8 | 2016.05.08 | Gainare Tottori | 1-0 | FC Ryukyu | Tottori Bank Bird Stadium | 1,385 |
| 9 | 2016.05.15 | YSCC Yokohama | 0-1 | Gainare Tottori | NHK Spring Mitsuzawa Football Stadium | 804 |
| 10 | 2016.05.22 | Gainare Tottori | 1-3 | Fujieda MYFC | Tottori Bank Bird Stadium | 2,058 |
| 11 | 2016.05.29 | SC Sagamihara | 1-0 | Gainare Tottori | Sagamihara Gion Stadium | 4,543 |
| 12 | 2016.06.12 | Gainare Tottori | 0-4 | Gamba Osaka U-23 | Tottori Bank Bird Stadium | 1,867 |
| 13 | 2016.06.19 | Gainare Tottori | 1-3 | Fukushima United FC | Chubu Yajin Stadium | 1,706 |
| 14 | 2016.06.25 | Cerezo Osaka U-23 | 2-2 | Gainare Tottori | Kincho Stadium | 1,221 |
| 15 | 2016.07.03 | Grulla Morioka | 2-0 | Gainare Tottori | Iwagin Stadium | 881 |
| 16 | 2016.07.10 | Gainare Tottori | 0-1 | SC Sagamihara | Tottori Bank Bird Stadium | 1,321 |
| 17 | 2016.07.16 | Blaublitz Akita | 3-0 | Gainare Tottori | Akigin Stadium | 1,702 |
| 18 | 2016.07.24 | Gainare Tottori | 2-0 | AC Nagano Parceiro | Tottori Bank Bird Stadium | 1,616 |
| 19 | 2016.07.31 | FC Tokyo U-23 | 0-1 | Gainare Tottori | Ajinomoto Field Nishigaoka | 1,375 |
| 20 | 2016.08.07 | Gainare Tottori | 3-3 | Grulla Morioka | Tottori Bank Bird Stadium | 2,335 |
| 5 | 2016.08.13 | Kataller Toyama | 4-1 | Gainare Tottori | Toyama Stadium | 2,770 |
| 21 | 2016.09.11 | Kagoshima United FC | 2-0 | Gainare Tottori | Kagoshima Kamoike Stadium | 3,667 |
| 22 | 2016.09.18 | Fujieda MYFC | 2-5 | Gainare Tottori | Fujieda Soccer Stadium | 1,221 |
| 23 | 2016.09.25 | Gainare Tottori | 2-1 | YSCC Yokohama | Tottori Bank Bird Stadium | 2,114 |
| 24 | 2016.10.02 | Fukushima United FC | 1-2 | Gainare Tottori | Toho Stadium | 2,079 |
| 25 | 2016.10.16 | Gainare Tottori | 1-2 | Cerezo Osaka U-23 | Tottori Bank Bird Stadium | 2,064 |
| 26 | 2016.10.23 | Gainare Tottori | 0-1 | Kataller Toyama | Chubu Yajin Stadium | 1,408 |
| 27 | 2016.10.30 | Gamba Osaka U-23 | 1-2 | Gainare Tottori | Expo '70 Commemorative Stadium | 1,400 |
| 28 | 2016.11.05 | Gainare Tottori | 0-1 | Tochigi SC | Tottori Bank Bird Stadium | 1,385 |
| 29 | 2016.11.13 | FC Ryukyu | 1-1 | Gainare Tottori | Okinawa Athletic Park Stadium | 2,041 |
| 30 | 2016.11.20 | Gainare Tottori | 2-4 | Oita Trinita | Tottori Bank Bird Stadium | 3,450 |
