= Hitoshi Nakata =

Japanese footballer and manager

Hitoshi Nakata 中田 仁司
Personal information
- Full name: Hitoshi Nakata
- Date of birth: January 17, 1962 (age 64)
- Place of birth: Osaka, Japan
- Height: 1.72 m (5 ft 7 1/2 in)
- Position: Midfielder

Youth career
- 1977–1979: Nihon University High School
- 1980–1983: Tokai University

Senior career*
Years	Team	Apps	(Gls)
1984–1991	Fujita Industries		
1991–1993	Otsuka Pharmaceutical		

Managerial career
- 2005: Nagoya Grampus Eight
- 2015: Yokohama FC
- 2016–2017: Yokohama FC
Medal record
Fujita Industries
Runner-up	Emperor's Cup	1985
Runner-up	Emperor's Cup	1988
- * Club domestic league appearances and goals

Hitoshi Nakata (中田 仁司, Nakata Hitoshi; born January 17, 1962) is a former Japanese football player and manager.

== Playing career ==
Nakata was born in Osaka Prefecture on January 17, 1962. After graduating from Tokai University, he played Fujita Industries (1984-1991) and Otsuka Pharmaceutical (1991-1993).

== Coaching career ==
After retirement, Nakata started coaching career at Otsuka Pharmaceutical (later Tokushima Vortis). He coached at Otsuka Pharmaceutical (1993-1995), Yokohama F. Marinos (1996-1999), Cerezo Osaka (2000-2003) and Nagoya Grampus Eight (2004-2007). In 2005, he also managed Nagoya Grampus Eight from September to December. In 2008, he moved to Tokushima Vortis and became Technical Advisor until October 2014. In 2015, he moved to Yokohama FC and became Technical Director. In September 2015, manager Miloš Rus resigned for health reasons. Nakata became a manager and managed 11 matches until the end of the season. In 2016 season, although Rus returned to manager, Rus resigned for heart arrhythmia in June. So, Nakata became a manager again. In October 2017, he was sacked for poor performance.

== Managerial statistics ==
Team	From	To	Record				
Team	From	To	G	W	D	L	Win %
Nagoya Grampus Eight	2005	2005	10	2	1	7	20.00
Yokohama FC	2015	2015	11	4	5	2	36.36
Yokohama FC	2016	2017	62	27	15	20	43.55
Total			83	33	21	29	39.76
