= Luciano Romero =

Argentine footballer

Personal information
- Full name: Luciano Daniel Romero
- Date of birth: August 28, 1993 (age 33)
- Place of birth: Buenos Aires, Argentina
- Height: 1.73 m (5 ft 8 in)
- Position: Midfielder

Youth career
- River Plate

Senior career*
Years	Team	Apps	(Gls)
2013–2016	River Plate	0	(0)
2013–2014	→ Douglas Haig (loan)	12	(1)
2014–2015	→ Deportivo Armenio (loan)	24	(0)
2015–2016	→ Deportes La Serena (loan)	14	(1)
2016	Renofa Yamaguchi	5	(0)
2016–2017	Deportivo Armenio	10	(0)
2017–2018	Fénix	31	(7)
2018–2019	Barracas Central	36	(6)
2019	Unión San Felipe	9	(2)
2019–2020	Almirante Brown	3	(0)
2020–2022	Barracas Central	33	(2)
2022	Unión San Felipe	7	(1)
2023	Nueva Chicago	2	(0)
2024	Deportivo Merlo		
- * Club domestic league appearances and goals as of 19:58, 10 January 2026 (UTC)

Luciano Daniel Romero (born 28 August 1993) is an Argentine footballer. who plays as a attacking midfielder. He is currently without a team.
