= Koo Bon-hyeok =

South Korean footballer

Koo Bon-hyeok 구본혁
Personal information
- Full name: Koo Bon-hyeok
- Date of birth: February 9, 1998 (age 28)
- Place of birth: South Korea
- Height: 1.75 m (5 ft 9 in)
- Position: Midfielder

Team information
- Current team: Chungju Citizen FC
- Number: 66

Senior career*
Years	Team	Apps	(Gls)
2016–2018	Montedio Yamagata	0	(0)
2017	→ Tegevajaro Miyazaki (loan)	0	(0)
2019	Gimhae FC	13	(1)
2020	FC Anyang	17	(0)
2021–	Chungju Citizen FC	6	(0)
- * Club domestic league appearances and goals as of 16 February 2022

Koo Bon-hyeok (Korean: 구본혁; born February 9, 1998) is a South Korean football player. He plays for Chungju Citizen FC.

== Career ==
Koo Bon-hyeok joined J2 League club Montedio Yamagata in 2016. On September 3, 2016, he debuted in Emperor's Cup (v Thespakusatsu Gunma).

== Club statistics ==
Updated to 20 February 2018.

Club performance			League		Cup		Total	
Season	Club	League	Apps	Goals	Apps	Goals	Apps	Goals
Japan			League		Emperor's Cup		Total	
2016	Montedio Yamagata	J2 League	0	0	2	0	2	0
2017	Montedio Yamagata	J2 League	0	0	2	0	2	0
2017	Tegevajaro Miyazaki	JRL (Kyushu)	0	0	-		2	0
Total			0	0	2	0	2	0
