= Lee Ho-jin (footballer) =

South Korean footballer (born 1983)

Lee Ho-Jin
Personal information
- Full name: Lee Ho-Jin
- Date of birth: 9 March 1983 (age 43)
- Place of birth: Seoul, South Korea
- Height: 1.80 m (5 ft 11 in)
- Position: Left back

Youth career
- Sungkyunkwan University

Senior career*
| Years | Team | Apps | (Gls) |
| 2006–2007 | Racing Santander | 1 | (0) |
| 2008 | Incheon United | 0 | (0) |
| 2009 | JJK | 1 | (0) |
| 2009 | → Jyväskylä Blackbird (loan) | ? | (?) |
| 2010 | Insee-Police Utd | ? | (?) |
| 2011 | Goyang KB | 2 | (0) |

International career^{‡}
| 2002–2003 | South Korea U-20 | 7 | (1) |
- * Club domestic league appearances and goals as of 1 February 2012 ‡ National team caps and goals as of 1 February 2012

Lee Ho-Jin (Korean: 이호진; born 9 March 1983) is a South Korean football defender. He has played for Spanish club Racing de Santander, South Korean club Incheon United, Finnish club JJK, Thai Premier League club Insee-Police Utd and South Korean second-tier Korea National League side Goyang Kookmin Bank FC.

== Career ==
He joined Racing de Santander in February 2006, but he suffered from injuries. His La Liga debut was 24 May 2006, in the last game of the 2005–2006 season against Villarreal CF. After two years at the club, he transferred to Incheon United.

He has had a tryout with the Finnish club FC Haka who wanted Lee to play as a left back, but he was not signed. In March 2009 he joined Finnish club JJK on a tryout. He was loaned to FC Jyväskylä Blackbird in August 2009.

== Club career statistics ==
| Club performance | | | League | | Cup | | League Cup | | Continental | | Total | |
| Season | Club | League | Apps | Goals | Apps | Goals | Apps | Goals | Apps | Goals | Apps | Goals |
| Spain | | | League | | Copa del Rey | | Supercopa de España | | Europe | | Total | |
|---|---|---|---|---|---|---|---|---|---|---|---|---|
| 2005–06 | Racing de Santander | La Liga | 1 | 0 | | | | | - | | | |
| 2006–07 | Racing de Santander | La Liga | 0 | 0 | | | | | - | | | |
| South Korea | | | League | | KFA Cup | | League Cup | | Asia | | Total | |
| 2008 | Incheon United | K-League | 0 | 0 | 0 | 0 | 0 | 0 | - | | 0 | 0 |
| Finland | | | League | | Finnish Cup | | League Cup | | Europe | | Total | |
| 2009 | JJK | Veikkausliiga | 1 | 0 | | | | | - | | | |
| Total | Spain | | 1 | 0 | | | | | 0 | 0 | | |
| Total | South Korea | | 0 | 0 | 0 | 0 | 0 | 0 | 0 | 0 | 0 | 0 |
| Total | Finland | | 1 | 0 | | | | | - | | | |
| Career total | | | 2 | 0 | | | | | 0 | 0 | | |
