= Yoon Seon-ho =

South Korean footballer

Personal information
- Full name: Yoon Seon-ho
- Date of birth: November 8, 1995 (age 30)
- Place of birth: South Korea
- Height: 1.92 m (6 ft 3 1/2 in)
- Position: Defender

Team information
- Current team: Pyeongchang United
- Number: 5

Senior career*
Years	Team	Apps	(Gls)
2017	Kamatamare Sanuki	0	(0)
2018	Kōchi United		
2019	Ansan Greeners	1	(0)
2020	Chuncheon	9	(0)
2021	Yangpyeong	6	(0)
2021	Yangju Citizen	10	(0)
2022	Gangneung	11	(0)
2022-	Pyeongchang United	0	(0)
- * Club domestic league appearances and goals as of 16 November 2019

Yoon Seon-ho (born November 8, 1995) is a South Korean football player. He plays for Ansan Greeners.

== Career ==
Yoon Seon-ho joined J2 League club Kamatamare Sanuki in 2017.
