= 2017 Gainare Tottori season =

Gainare Tottori
2017 season
- Manager: Ryuzo Morioka
- Stadium: Tottori Bank Bird Stadium
- J3 League: 17th
Home colours	Away colours

2017 Gainare Tottori season.

== J3 League ==
=== League table ===
Pos	Team	Pld	W	D	L	GF	GA	GD	Pts
13	Cerezo Osaka U-23	32	8	11	13	39	43	−4	35
14	YSCC Yokohama	32	8	8	16	41	54	−13	32
15	Grulla Morioka	32	7	8	17	32	49	−17	29
16	Gamba Osaka U-23	32	7	5	20	31	65	−34	26
17	Gainare Tottori	32	4	9	19	31	63	−32	21

Source: 2017 MEIJI YASUDA J3 LEAGUE League table
Rules for classification: 1) Points; 2) Goal difference; 3) Goals scored; 4th) head-to-head results; 5th) disciplinary points; 6th) draw

=== Match details ===
J3 League match details
Match	Date	Team	Score	Team	Venue	Attendance
1	2017.03.12	Gamba Osaka U-23	0-2	Gainare Tottori	Suita City Football Stadium	2,148
2	2017.03.19	Gainare Tottori	1-1	Tochigi SC	Tottori Bank Bird Stadium	2,435
3	2017.03.26	Gainare Tottori	1-0	AC Nagano Parceiro	Tottori Bank Bird Stadium	1,574
5	2017.04.16	Blaublitz Akita	3-1	Gainare Tottori	Akigin Stadium	1,518
6	2017.04.30	Gainare Tottori	2-2	Grulla Morioka	Tottori Bank Bird Stadium	2,067
7	2017.05.07	YSCC Yokohama	1-2	Gainare Tottori	NHK Spring Mitsuzawa Football Stadium	1,198
8	2017.05.14	Giravanz Kitakyushu	2-0	Gainare Tottori	Mikuni World Stadium Kitakyushu	4,395
9	2017.05.21	Gainare Tottori	1-3	Cerezo Osaka U-23	Tottori Bank Bird Stadium	1,363
10	2017.05.28	Gainare Tottori	1-2	Fukushima United FC	Chubu Yajin Stadium	1,626
11	2017.06.04	Kagoshima United FC	2-1	Gainare Tottori	Kagoshima Kamoike Stadium	4,311
12	2017.06.10	Fujieda MYFC	1-1	Gainare Tottori	Fujieda Soccer Stadium	1,149
13	2017.06.18	Gainare Tottori	0-1	Kataller Toyama	Tottori Bank Bird Stadium	2,054
14	2017.06.25	FC Ryukyu	2-1	Gainare Tottori	Okinawa Athletic Park Stadium	1,813
15	2017.07.02	Gainare Tottori	2-2	Azul Claro Numazu	Tottori Bank Bird Stadium	1,552
16	2017.07.09	SC Sagamihara	1-1	Gainare Tottori	Sagamihara Gion Stadium	3,106
17	2017.07.15	Gainare Tottori	0-6	FC Tokyo U-23	Tottori Bank Bird Stadium	1,875
18	2017.07.23	Grulla Morioka	1-2	Gainare Tottori	Iwagin Stadium	520
19	2017.08.20	Azul Claro Numazu	1-1	Gainare Tottori	Ashitaka Park Stadium	2,962
20	2017.08.26	Gainare Tottori	1-2	SC Sagamihara	Tottori Bank Bird Stadium	2,009
21	2017.09.03	AC Nagano Parceiro	3-0	Gainare Tottori	Minami Nagano Sports Park Stadium	3,484
22	2017.09.10	Gainare Tottori	1-2	YSCC Yokohama	Chubu Yajin Stadium	1,569
23	2017.09.17	Fukushima United FC	2-0	Gainare Tottori	Toho Stadium	629
24	2017.09.24	Gainare Tottori	1-6	Fujieda MYFC	Tottori Bank Bird Stadium	1,401
26	2017.10.08	Gainare Tottori	1-2	Kagoshima United FC	Tottori Bank Bird Stadium	1,116
27	2017.10.16	FC Tokyo U-23	1-0	Gainare Tottori	Ajinomoto Stadium	1,139
28	2017.10.22	Gainare Tottori	0-0	Gamba Osaka U-23	Chubu Yajin Stadium	787
29	2017.10.29	Gainare Tottori	2-3	FC Ryukyu	Tottori Bank Bird Stadium	573
30	2017.11.05	Cerezo Osaka U-23	2-0	Gainare Tottori	Kochi Haruno Athletic Stadium	1,422
31	2017.11.12	Gainare Tottori	3-4	Giravanz Kitakyushu	Tottori Bank Bird Stadium	1,191
32	2017.11.19	Tochigi SC	1-1	Gainare Tottori	Tochigi Green Stadium	6,880
33	2017.11.26	Kataller Toyama	1-1	Gainare Tottori	Toyama Stadium	2,876
34	2017.12.03	Gainare Tottori	0-3	Blaublitz Akita	Tottori Bank Bird Stadium	1,746

== Emperor's Cup ==
Lost to Kagoshima United in the 1st round.
