= Hiroaki Nagashima =

Japanese footballer and manager

Hiroaki Nagashima 長島 裕明
Personal information
- Full name: Hiroaki Nagashima
- Date of birth: March 22, 1967 (age 59)
- Place of birth: Kanagawa, Japan
- Height: 1.74 m (5 ft 8 1/2 in)
- Position: Defender

Team information
- Current team: Tochigi SC (assistant manager)

Youth career
- 1982–1984: Nihon University High School
- 1985–1988: Nihon University

Senior career*
| Years | Team | Apps | (Gls) |
| 1989–1991 | Fujita Industries | 0 | (0) |
| Total | | 0 | (0) |

Managerial career
- 2016: Tokushima Vortis
- * Club domestic league appearances and goals

Hiroaki Nagashima (長島 裕明, Nagashima Hiroaki; born March 22, 1967) is a former Japanese football player and manager, He is the currently assistant manager of J2 League side Tochigi SC.

== Playing career ==
Nagashima was born in Kanagawa Prefecture on March 22, 1967. After graduating from Nihon University, he played for Fujita Industries from 1989 to 1991.

== Coaching career ==
After playing for two seasons with Fujita Industries, Nagashima became a manager. He spent two seasons with Otsuka Pharmaceutical (later Tokushima Vortis) U-15, then he moved back to Tokyo, where he was assigned first to U-15, then U-18: under his guidance, many players had their debut with FC Tokyo.

Nagashima then worked with Montedio Yamagata before coming back to Tokushima Vortis, where he inherited Shinji Kobayashi's job in 2016 after having been his second for three seasons. He resigned end of 2016 season.

== Managerial statistics ==
| Team | From | To | Record | | | | |
| Team | From | To | G | W | D | L | Win % |
|---|---|---|---|---|---|---|---|
| Tokushima Vortis | 2016 | 2016 | 42 | 16 | 9 | 17 | 38.10 |
| Total | | | 42 | 16 | 9 | 17 | 38.10 |
