= Tokushima Vortis =

Japanese football club

Tokushima Vortis 徳島ヴォルティス
- Full name: Tokushima Vortis
- Nickname: Vortis
- Founded: 1955; 71 years ago
- Ground: Pocarisweat Stadium; Naruto, Tokushima
- Capacity: 17,924
- Chairman: Kazuhiro Kishida
- Manager: Takefumi Otani
- League: J2 League
- 2025: J2 League, 4th of 20
- Website: vortis.jp
Home colours

Tokushima Vortis (徳島ヴォルティス, Tokushima Vorutisu) is a Japanese professional football club located in Tokushima, capital of Tokushima Prefecture. The club currently playing in the J2 League, the Japanese second tier of professional football league.

== Name origin ==
The name, "Vortis" was named in 1997 (see below), and it was explained as a coinage of Italian "Vortice" (meaning whirlpool, after the famous Naruto whirlpool in Naruto Strait). The name was chosen to exhibit the dynamics of a whirlpool in the hope of swallowing up the whole audience in excitement by its power, speed and unity.

== History ==
Founded in 1955 as Otsuka Pharmaceutical Co., Ltd. Soccer Club, VORTIS joined the J-League in 2005. They are still sponsored by Otsuka's best-known brand, Pocari Sweat sports drink.

They were first promoted to the old Japan Soccer League Division 2 in 1989, but the company's reluctance to professionalize the team forced it to compete in the former JFL and current JFL. In the 1997 old JFL season, they first sported a Vortis Tokushima name, but the lack of fan interest at the time forced them to go back to the corporate identity. They finally adopted the Tokushima Vortis name for good after winning the new JFL championship in 2004 and being promoted.

The first season in J2 was naturally a difficult one for Vortis, but they surprised many sceptics with their determination and quality of play. The team rose as high as fourth place, at one point, before slipping down the table later in the season to finish ninth. In 2006, the team was forced to rebuild, as the players who took the team into the J.League began to hit the ceiling of their abilities and made way for younger replacements. As a result, despite the encouragement of a local rivalry with Ehime FC, Tokushima drifted down-table, and they followed it up with a last-place finish in 2007 and 2008.

In 2013, they earned fourth place in J2, matching the same placement they had two years before in the division and twenty years before in the old JFL Division 1; this time they won the playoff, defeating Kyoto Sanga F.C. in the final round at the National Stadium in Tokyo, thus becoming the first professional Shikoku football club to compete in the top division of their national league.

Until their promotion, they were the only former JSL member currently a member of the J.League which has never competed in the top tier of Japanese football. With promotion and the creation of the J3 League in 2014, the distinction was taken over by Blaublitz Akita.

In the 2019 season, they finished 4th again and were one win away from a return to J1 in the playoffs, but ultimately failed to beat Shonan Bellmare away in the final game. In 2020, despite the COVID-19 pandemic, they did one better and were promoted as J2 champions.

=== Team name transition ===
- Otsuka Pharmaceutical (1955–1996, 1998–2004)
- Vortis Tokushima (1997)
- Tokushima Vortis FC (2005–present)

== Stadium ==
Their home stadium is Naruto Otsuka Sports Park Pocari Sweat Stadium, in Naruto, Tokushima.

== League & cup record ==
Champions	Runners-up	Third place	Promoted	Relegated

League													J.League Cup	Emperor's Cup
Season	Div.	Teams	Pos.	P	W	D	L	F	A	GD	Pts	Attendance/G	J.League Cup	Emperor's Cup
Otsuka Pharmaceuticals
2003	JFL	16	1st	30	23	3	4	65	21	44	72	781	Not eligible	3rd round
2004	JFL	16	1st	30	25	3	2	74	20	54	78	3,046	Not eligible	2nd round
Tokushima Vortis
2005	J2	12	9th	44	12	16	16	60	76	-16	52	4,366	Not eligible	4th round
2006	J2	13	13th	48	8	11	29	43	92	-49	35	3,477	Not eligible	4th round
2007	J2	13	13th	48	6	15	27	31	67	-36	33	3,289	Not eligible	4th round
2008	J2	15	15th	42	7	8	27	40	72	-32	29	3,862	Not eligible	3rd round
2009	J2	18	9th	51	19	15	17	67	52	15	72	4,073	Not eligible	2nd round
2010	J2	19	8th	36	15	6	15	51	47	4	51	4,614	Not eligible	3rd round
2011	J2	20	4th	38	19	8	11	51	38	13	65	5,207	Not eligible	2nd round
2012	J2	22	15th	42	13	12	17	45	49	-4	51	3,991	Not eligible	3rd round
2013	J2	22	4th	42	20	7	15	56	51	5	67	4,348	Not eligible	2nd round
2014	J1	18	18th	34	3	5	26	16	74	-58	14	8,884	Group stage	3rd round
2015	J2	22	14th	42	13	14	15	35	44	-9	53	5,019	Not eligible	4th round
2016	J2	22	9th	42	16	9	17	46	42	4	57	4,565	Not eligible	3rd round
2017	J2	22	7th	42	18	13	11	71	45	26	67	4,979	Not eligible	2nd round
2018	J2	22	11th	42	16	8	18	48	42	6	56	4,997	Not eligible	3rd round
2019	J2	22	4th	42	21	10	11	67	45	22	73	5,736	Not eligible	3rd round
2020 †	J2	22	1st	42	25	9	8	67	33	34	84	3,100	Not eligible	Semi-finalist
2021	J1	20	17th	38	10	6	22	34	55	-21	36	5,664	Group stage	3rd round
2022	J2	22	8th	42	13	23	6	48	35	13	62	4,224	Group stage	3rd round
2023	J2	22	15th	42	10	19	13	43	53	-10	49	5,976	Not eligible	3rd round
2024	J2	20	8th	38	16	7	15	42	44	-2	55	6,054	1st round	3rd round
2025	J2	20	4th	38	18	11	9	45	24	21	65	9,703	1st round	3rd round
2026	J2	40	9th	18	9	3	6	36	22	14	32	6,323	N/A	N/A
2026–27	J2	20	TBD	38									TBD	TBD

Key

- Pos. = Position in league; P = Games played; W = Games won; D = Games drawn; L = Games lost; F = Goals scored; A = Goals conceded; GD = Goals difference; Pts = Points gained
- Attendance/G = Average league home attendance
- † 2020 season attendance reduced by COVID-19 worldwide pandemic
- Source: J. League Data Site

== Honours ==
Tokushima Vortis honours
Honour	No.	Years	Notes
Shikoku Football League	4	1978, 1979, 1981, 1989	as Otsuka Pharmaceutical
Japan Football League	2	2003, 2004	as Otsuka Pharmaceutical
J2 League	1	2020	

== Players ==
=== Current squad ===
As of 1 August 2026.

Note: Flags indicate national team as defined under FIFA eligibility rules; some limited exceptions apply. Players may hold more than one non-FIFA nationality.

No.	Pos.	Nation	Player
2	DF	JPN	Hayato Tanaka (on loan from Kashiwa Reysol)
3	DF	JPN	Nao Yamada (captain)
4	DF	BRA	Kaique Mafaldo
5	DF	JPN	Hayato Aoki
6	MF	JPN	Naoki Kanuma (vice-captain)
7	MF	JPN	Shunto Kodama
8	MF	JPN	Ken Iwao
9	FW	BRA	Thonny Anderson (vice-captain)
10	MF	JPN	Taro Sugimoto
11	FW	BRA	Lucas Barcellos
14	FW	JPN	Yukihito Kajiya
15	DF	JPN	Kohei Yamakoshi
16	FW	JPN	Daiki Watari (vice-captain)
17	MF	JPN	Tetsuyuki Inami
19	FW	JPN	Jumma Miyazaki
22	DF	JPN	Ko Yanagisawa

No.	Pos.	Nation	Player
23	MF	JPN	Yu Takada
24	MF	JPN	Soya Takada
26	MF	JPN	Yusei Onoe
27	FW	NGR	Lawrence David
28	DF	JPN	Towa Nishisaka
29	GK	JPN	Daiki Mitsui
31	GK	JPN	Toru Hasegawa
37	GK	JPN	Kai Chidi Kitamura
42	DF	JPN	Yuya Takagi
43	MF	JPN	Tsubasa Ito ^{DSP}
44	DF	JPN	Tatsuya Yamaguchi
50	GK	KOR	Kang Young-kwang
55	MF	JPN	Takuya Shigehiro
69	MF	JPN	Muku Fukuta
97	DF	JPN	Malcolm Tsuyoshi Moyo

=== Out on loan ===
Note: Flags indicate national team as defined under FIFA eligibility rules; some limited exceptions apply. Players may hold more than one non-FIFA nationality.

No.	Pos.	Nation	Player
21	GK	JPN	Kokoro Aoki (at Kamatamare Sanuki)

No.	Pos.	Nation	Player
77	MF	BRA	Thales (at Kagoshima United)
—	FW	JPN	Kiyoshiro Tsuboi (at Kataller Toyama)

== Club staff ==
Position	Staff
Manager	(Japan) Takefumi Otani
First-team coach	(Japan) Masaya Yamaguchi (Japan) Tsuyoshi Furukawa
Goalkeeper coach	(Japan) Masahiko Nakagawa
Analyst	(Japan) Akira Nakajima
Physical coach	(Brazil) Wellington
Rehabilitation fitness coach	(Japan) Atsushi Nagatani
Chief trainer	(Japan) Shoji Suzuki
Trainer	(Japan) Hisaaki Maehara (Japan) Masaya Furukawa (Japan) Kenta Saito
Interpreter	(Japan) Masahiro Fukasawa (Japan) Masayuki Hatamoto Ferreira (Japan) Hiroki Nunome
General manager	(Japan) Yusuke Abe
Assistant general manager	(Japan) Yuya Ishii (Japan) Daiki Sugawara

== Managerial history ==
Manager	Nationality	Tenure	
Manager	Nationality	Start	Finish
Kunio Yamade	Japan	1988	31 January 1993
Hajime Ishii	Japan	1 February 1993	31 January 1996
Edinho	Brazil	1 February 1996	31 December 1998
Shinji Tanaka	Japan	1 January 1999	28 September 2006
Yutaka Azuma	Japan	28 September 2006	31 January 2007
Masataka Imai	Japan	1 January 2007	31 January 2008
Naohiko Minobe	Japan	1 February 2008	31 January 2012
Shinji Kobayashi	Japan	1 February 2012	31 January 2016
Hiroaki Nagashima	Japan	25 November 2015	31 January 2017
Ricardo Rodríguez	Spain	1 February 2017	31 January 2021
Takeshi Komoto (Interim)	Japan	1 February 2021	16 April 2021
Dani Poyatos	Spain	1 February 2021; Actual start date 16 April 2021	31 January 2023
Beñat Labaien	Spain	1 February 2023	22 August 2023
Tatsuma Yoshida	Japan	23 August 2023	31 March 2024
Kosaku Masuda	Japan	1 April 2024 (Interim); 7 May 2024 (Official)	28 December 2025
Gert Engels	Germany	28 December 2025	8 May 2026
Takefumi Otani	Japan	8 May 2026	Current

== Kit evolution ==
Home kits - 1st
2005-2006	2007-2008	2009-2010	2011-2012	2013
2014	2015	2016	2017	2018
2019	2020	2021	2022	2023
2024	2025 -			

Away kits - 2nd
2005-2006	2007-2008	2009-2010	2011-2012	2013
2014	2015	2016	2017	2018
2019	2020	2021	2022	2023
2024	2025 -			

Other kits - 3rd
2017; Summer 3rd	2019; 15th Anniversary; Summer Only	2021; Summer	2024; 20th Anniversary
