= Yokohama FC =

Japanese football club

Yokohama FC 横浜FC
- Full name: Yokohama Football Club
- Nickname: Fulie
- Founded: 25 December 1998; 27 years ago
- Ground: Mitsuzawa Stadium; Kanagawa-ku, Yokohama
- Capacity: 15,046
- Owner: Onodera Group
- Chairman: Yuji Onodera
- Manager: Daisuke Sudo
- League: J2 League
- 2025: J1 League, 18th of 20 (relegated)
- Website: yokohamafc.com
| Home colours | Away colours |

Yokohama Football Club (横浜FC, Yokohama Efushī) is a Japanese professional football club based in Yokohama, Kanagawa Prefecture, part of the Greater Tokyo Area. The club was formed by fans of Yokohama Flügels as a protest against Flügels' merger with Yokohama Marinos in 1999, becoming the first supporter-owned professional sports team in Japan. They are set to play in the J2 League from 2026–27, the second tier of Japanese football, after relegation from the J1 League in 2025.

Since gaining J.League membership in 2001, Yokohama spent considerable time in the second tier of the Japanese football league system. The club gained promotion to J.League Division 1 for the 2007 season after winning the Division 2 title. However, YFC were immediately relegated in the following season. After 12 years in the J2 League, they returned to Japan's top tier, now called the J1 League, for the 2020 season. The team finished 15th in its first season back in the top flight, but in 2021 they were relegated to J2 after finishing the season in last place. The team was promoted again to J1 in 2025 after a one year stint in the second tier in 2024, then relegated once again the following season.

== History ==
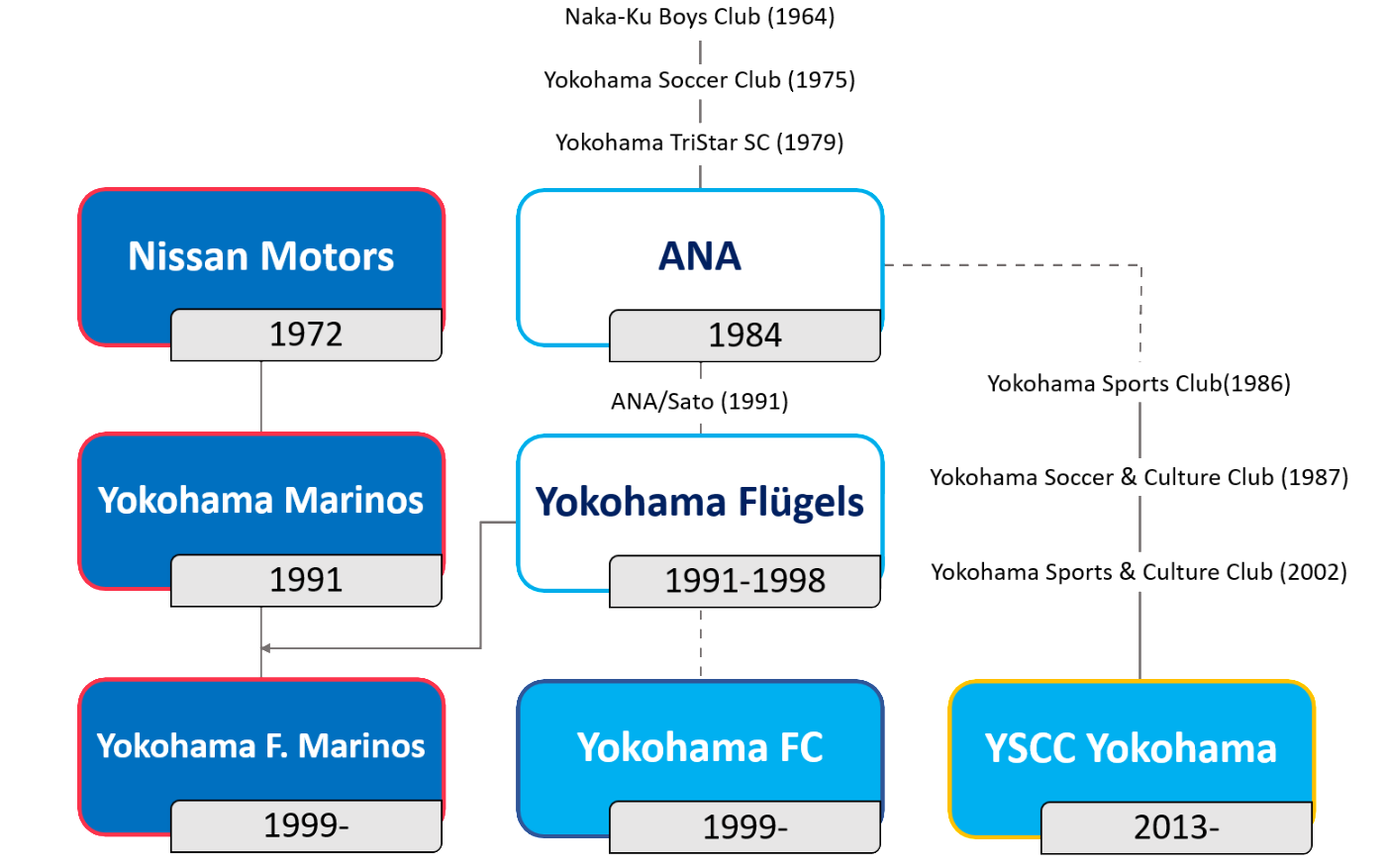
Graphical timeline of Yokohama football clubs

Yokohama was formed on 25 December 1998 following the merger of Yokohama's two J.League clubs, the Flügels and the Marinos. Flügels supporters felt that their club had essentially been dissolved rather than merged with, so rejected the suggestion that they should start supporting Marinos – who had been their crosstown rivals. Instead, with money raised through donations from the general public and an affiliation with talent management company IMG, the former Flügels supporters founded the Yokohama Fulie Sports Club. Following the socio model used by FC Barcelona, the Fulie Sports Club created Yokohama Football Club, the first professional sports team in Japan owned and operated by its supporters.

For its first season in 1999, Yokohama hired former Germany national team and FIFA World Cup star Pierre Littbarski to be the manager and Yasuhiko Okudera, the first Japanese footballer to play professionally in Europe, to be the chairman. The club attempted to gain entry directly into the professional J.League, but the Japan Football Association only permitted entry to the amateur Japan Football League (JFL), at the time the third level of the Japanese football league system, and ruled that the club would not be eligible for promotion into J.League Division 2 at the end of its first season. So, despite finishing as JFL champion in 1999, Yokohama finished as JFL champion again in 2000 before being promoted to J.League Division 2.

Although they had a dire season in 2005, ending 11th out of 12, they were in the top half of table throughout the 2006 season. Yokohama had lost all of their pre-season matches, including against college teams; they later hired player-manager Takuya Takagi, under whom they saw success. On 26 November 2006, they finished in the top spot of the J2 League and were promoted to the J. League 1. Yokohama's financial situation remained poor, with no ownership of their stadium or training ground, and few staff members. One of their players, Kazuyoshi Miura, last played for the team at the age of 53, and a former player, Atsuhiro Miura (one of their main players before his 2010 retirement) was 36 when he last played for the club. These players once played for the Japan national team.

In 2007, just the ninth year of its existence, Yokohama played its first season in the top flight of Japanese football. After a poor season, the team were relegated with five games of the season still remaining. Despite their early relegation, Yokohama defeated title contenders Urawa Red Diamonds on the last day of the season, allowing Kashima Antlers to secure the J.League Division 1 title.

In 2018, Yokohama narrowly missed out on automatic promotion by goal difference. The team made it to the J2 promotion final, losing to Tokyo Verdy on a stoppage time winner. In 2019, Yokohama finished second in J2 and gained automatic promotion to J1.

After finishing in last place in 2021, Yokohama would be relegated back to J2 for the 2022 season, but they bounced back immediately to J1 League the next year. On 25 November 2023, Yokohama FC were relegated from J1 to J2 from 2024 after the club lost to Shonan Bellmare. On 11 November 2024, Yokohama FC secure promotion again to J1 from 2025 after draw against Renofa Yamaguchi FC 0–0 in final matchweek and ended one year stint in second tier.

== Crest ==
Yokohama's crest features a phoenix, symbolizing the rise of Yokohama from the ashes of the Yokohama Flügels. The blue ribbon on the top represents the Blue Ribbon Movement, a movement that began at the end of the 1998 J.League season to keep the Flugels alive.

== Kit and colours ==
As they could not adopt directly Flügels' white and blue strip given its similarity to that of Marinos, Yokohama decided to adopt an all-cyan kit, after NKK SC, a former company club which had closed in 1994. NKK SC was based in Kawasaki and played most matches at Todoroki Athletics Stadium, but used Mitsuzawa Stadium on days when the other Kawasaki clubs at the time (Verdy Kawasaki, Toshiba and Fujitsu) used the Todoroki stadium.

== Current squad ==
As of 21 October 2026.

Note: Flags indicate national team as defined under FIFA eligibility rules; some limited exceptions apply. Players may hold more than one non-FIFA nationality.

| No. | Pos. | Nation | Player |
|---|---|---|---|
| 4 | MF | JPN | Hinata Ogura |
| 5 | DF | JPN | Kyo Hosoi |
| 7 | MF | JPN | Kota Yamada |
| 9 | FW | BRA | Lukian |
| 10 | FW | BRA | João Paulo |
| 13 | MF | JPN | Ryo Kubota |
| 14 | MF | JPN | Hayase Takashio |
| 15 | DF | JPN | Kengo Hayashi |
| 16 | DF | JPN | Makito Ito |
| 18 | MF | JPN | Takuya Shimamura (on loan from Kashiwa Reysol) |
| 19 | DF | JPN | Hayato Sugita |
| 20 | MF | JPN | Toma Murata |
| 21 | GK | JPN | Akinori Ichikawa |
| 22 | DF | JPN | Katsuya Iwatake (captain) |
| 23 | FW | JPN | Kantaro Maeda |
| 24 | DF | JPN | Jui Hata |

| No. | Pos. | Nation | Player |
|---|---|---|---|
| 26 | MF | JPN | Akiyuki Yokoyama |
| 28 | MF | JPN | Koki Kumakura |
| 29 | DF | JPN | Ryusei Nakamura ^{DSP} |
| 30 | FW | JPN | Kanta Chiba |
| 31 | GK | JPN | Manato Harada ^{DSP} |
| 35 | MF | JPN | Koshiro Uda |
| 37 | MF | JPN | Yuto Shimizu |
| 42 | GK | JPN | Ryo Ishii |
| 45 | FW | JPN | Kakeru Saito ^{Type 2} |
| 48 | DF | JPN | Kaili Shimbo |
| 49 | FW | JPN | Naoya Komazawa |
| 63 | DF | JPN | Sota Tsukuda |
| 70 | MF | JPN | Rita Watanabe ^{DSP} |
| 77 | MF | JPN | Leo Takae |
| 78 | MF | JPN | Ryosuke Iwasaki |
| 90 | FW | BRA | Adaílton |

=== Out on loan ===
Note: Flags indicate national team as defined under FIFA eligibility rules; some limited exceptions apply. Players may hold more than one non-FIFA nationality.

| No. | Pos. | Nation | Player |
|---|---|---|---|
| 3 | DF | JPN | Junya Suzuki (at Renofa Yamaguchi FC) |
| 11 | FW | JPN | Kazuyoshi Miura (at Fukushima United FC) |
| 27 | GK | POL | Jakub Słowik (at Mito HollyHock) |
| 94 | DF | JPN | Soma Sato (at SC Sagamihara) |
| — | MF | JPN | Takanari Endo (at Giravanz Kitakyushu) |

| No. | Pos. | Nation | Player |
|---|---|---|---|
| — | DF | JPN | Ibuki Matsushita (at FC Tokushima) |
| — | MF | JPN | Tomoya Takahashi (at (Portugal) C.D. Celoricense) |
| — | FW | JPN | Izumi Miyata (at Roasso Kumamoto) |
| — | MF | JPN | Yoshiaki Komai (at FC Imabari) |

== Club officials ==
As of 10 November 2026.

| Role | Name |
|---|---|
| Manager | (Japan) Daisuke Sudo |
| Coaches | (Japan) Yuji Yabu (Japan) Ryo Tadokoro (Japan) Tsuyoshi Yoshitake |
| Goalkeeper coach | (Japan) Yoichi Doi |
| Physical coach | (Japan) Kazutaka Takahashi |
| Conditioning coach | (Japan) Kenta Kanno |
| Chief trainer | (Japan) Masahiro Watanabe |
| Trainers | (Japan) Yuki Katase (Japan) Hiroki Naito (Japan) Kazuhiro Sagawa (Japan) Kengo Nemoto (Japan) Keisuke Ozawa (Japan) Kyohei Nishimura |

== Managerial history ==
| Manager | Nationality | Tenure | |
| Manager | Nationality | Start | Finish |
|---|---|---|---|
| Pierre Littbarski | Germany | 1 February 1999 | 31 December 2000 |
| Yoshikazu Nagai | Japan | 1 January 2001 | 10 September 2001 |
| Yūji Sakakura | Japan | 11 September 2001 | 15 September 2001 |
| Pierre Littbarski | Germany | 1 February 2003 | 31 January 2005 |
| Yūsuke Adachi | Japan | 1 January 2005 | 6 March 2006 |
| Takuya Takagi | Japan | 7 March 2006 | 27 August 2007 |
| Júlio César Leal | Brazil | 28 August 2007 | 31 December 2007 |
| Satoshi Tsunami | Japan | 1 February 2008 | 31 January 2009 |
| Yasuhiro Higuchi | Japan | 1 February 2009 | 31 January 2010 |
| Yasuyuki Kishino | Japan | 1 February 2010 | 18 March 2012 |
| Takahiro Taguchi | Japan | 18 March 2012 | 21 March 2012 |
| Motohiro Yamaguchi | Japan | 21 March 2012 | 31 January 2015 |
| Miloš Rus | Slovenia | 1 January 2015 | 14 September 2015 |
| Hitoshi Nakata | Japan | 14 September 2015 | 1 December 2015 |
| Miloš Rus | Slovenia | 1 December 2015 | 15 June 2016 |
| Hitoshi Nakata | Japan | 16 June 2016 | 15 October 2017 |
| Tomonobu Hayakawa | Japan | 15 October 2017 | 17 October 2017 |
| Yasuhiko Okudera | Japan | 19 October 2017 | 23 October 2017 |
| Edson Tavares | Brazil | 24 October 2017 | 13 May 2019 |
| Takahiro Shimotaira | Japan | 14 May 2019 | 8 April 2021 |
| Tomonobu Hayakawa | Japan | 8 April 2021 | 31 January 2022 |
| Shūhei Yomoda | Japan | 1 February 2022 | 23 July 2025 |
| Fumitake Miura | Japan | 23 July 2025 | 13 November 2025 |
| Daisuke Sudo | Japan | 8 December 2025 | Present |

== Record as J.League member ==
| Champions | Runners-up | Third place | Promoted | Relegated |

| League | | | | | | | | | | | | | J.League Cup | Emperor's Cup |
| Season | Div. | Teams | Pos. | P | W (OTW) | D | L (OTL) | F | A | GD | Pts | Attendance/G | J.League Cup | Emperor's Cup |
|---|---|---|---|---|---|---|---|---|---|---|---|---|---|---|
| 2001 | J2 | 12 | 9th | 44 | 12 (3) | 1 | 25 (3) | 58 | 81 | -23 | 43 | 3,007 | 2nd round | Round of 16 |
| 2002 | J2 | 12 | 12th | 44 | 8 | 11 | 25 | 43 | 81 | -38 | 35 | 3,477 | – | 3rd round |
| 2003 | J2 | 12 | 11th | 44 | 10 | 12 | 22 | 49 | 88 | -39 | 42 | 3,743 | – | 3rd round |
| 2004 | J2 | 12 | 8th | 44 | 10 | 22 | 12 | 42 | 50 | -8 | 52 | 4,219 | – | Round of 16 |
| 2005 | J2 | 12 | 11th | 44 | 10 | 15 | 19 | 48 | 64 | -16 | 45 | 5,938 | – | 4th round |
| 2006 | J2 | 13 | 1st | 48 | 26 | 15 | 7 | 61 | 32 | -29 | 93 | 5,119 | – | 3rd round |
| 2007 | J1 | 18 | 18th | 34 | 4 | 4 | 26 | 19 | 66 | -47 | 16 | 14,039 | Group stage | Round of 16 |
| 2008 | J2 | 15 | 10th | 42 | 11 | 17 | 14 | 51 | 56 | -5 | 50 | 6,793 | – | Round of 16 |
| 2009 | J2 | 18 | 16th | 51 | 11 | 11 | 29 | 43 | 70 | -27 | 44 | 3,535 | – | 3rd round |
| 2010 | J2 | 19 | 6th | 36 | 16 | 6 | 14 | 54 | 47 | 7 | 54 | 5,791 | – | 3rd round |
| 2011 | J2 | 20 | 18th | 38 | 11 | 8 | 19 | 40 | 54 | -14 | 41 | 5,770 | – | 2nd round |
| 2012 | J2 | 22 | 4th | 42 | 22 | 7 | 13 | 62 | 45 | 17 | 73 | 6,039 | – | 3rd round |
| 2013 | J2 | 22 | 11th | 42 | 15 | 13 | 14 | 49 | 46 | 3 | 58 | 6,064 | – | 2nd round |
| 2014 | J2 | 22 | 11th | 42 | 14 | 13 | 15 | 49 | 47 | 2 | 55 | 5,146 | – | 2nd round |
| 2015 | J2 | 22 | 15th | 42 | 13 | 13 | 16 | 33 | 58 | -25 | 52 | 5,113 | – | 2nd round |
| 2016 | J2 | 22 | 8th | 42 | 16 | 11 | 15 | 50 | 51 | -1 | 59 | 4,892 | – | Round of 16 |
| 2017 | J2 | 22 | 10th | 42 | 17 | 12 | 13 | 60 | 49 | 11 | 63 | 5,967 | – | 2nd round |
| 2018 | J2 | 22 | 3rd | 42 | 21 | 13 | 8 | 63 | 44 | 19 | 76 | 6,141 | – | 3rd round |
| 2019 | J2 | 22 | 2nd | 42 | 23 | 10 | 9 | 66 | 40 | 26 | 79 | 7,061 | – | 3rd round |
| 2020 † | J1 | 18 | 15th | 34 | 9 | 6 | 19 | 38 | 60 | -22 | 33 | 3,559 | Group stage | Did not qualify |
| 2021 † | J1 | 20 | 20th | 38 | 6 | 9 | 23 | 32 | 77 | -45 | 27 | 4,511 | Group stage | 2nd round |
| 2022 | J2 | 22 | 2nd | 42 | 23 | 11 | 8 | 66 | 49 | 17 | 80 | 5,088 | – | 3rd round |
| 2023 | J1 | 18 | 18th | 34 | 7 | 8 | 19 | 31 | 58 | -27 | 29 | 9,128 | Group stage | 3rd round |
| 2024 | J2 | 20 | 2nd | 38 | 22 | 10 | 6 | 60 | 27 | 33 | 76 | 6,963 | 3rd round | 3rd round |
| 2025 | J1 | 20 | 18th | 38 | 9 | 8 | 21 | 27 | 45 | -18 | 35 | 10,199 | Semi-final | 3rd round |
| 2026 | J2 | 40 | 13th | 18 | 8 | 3 | 7 | 34 | 27 | 7 | 29 | 6,238 | – | |
| 2026–27 | J2 | 20 | TBA | 38 | | | | | | | | | | |

Key

- Pos. = Position in league; P = Games played; W = Games won; D = Games drawn; L = Games lost; F = Goals scored; A = Goals conceded; GD = Goals difference; Pts = Points gained
- Attendance/G = Average home league attendance
- † 2020 & 2021 season's attendances reduced by COVID-19 worldwide pandemic.
- Source: J. League Data Site

== Honours ==
Yokohama FC honours
| Honour | No. | Years |
|---|---|---|
| Japan Football League | 2 | 1999, 2000 |
| J2 League | 1 | 2006 |

== Kit evolution ==
Home kits - 1st
| 2001 | 2002 | 2003 - 2004 | 2005 - 2006 | 2007 - 2008 |
| 2009 - 2010 | 2011 - 2012 | 2013 | 2014 | 2015 |
| 2016 | 2017 | 2018 | 2019 | 2020 |
| 2021 | 2022 | 2023 | 2024 | 2025 |
2026 -

Away kits - 2nd
| 2001 | 2002 | 2003 - 2004 | 2005 - 2006 | 2007 - 2008 |
| 2009 - 2010 | 2011 - 2012 | 2013 | 2014 | 2015 |
| 2016 | 2017 | 2018 | 2019 | 2020 |
| 2021 | 2022 | 2023 | 2024 | 2025 |
2026 -

Special / 3rd Kit
| 2010 3rd | 2012 3rd Anniversary of the Establishment of Modern Waterworks | 2013; Club 15th Anniversary Celebration | 2014; Nippatsu Mitsuzawa Ball Game Stadium 60th Anniversary Commemoration | 2015; Hometown Project 15th Anniversary |
2015; Emperor's Cup Commemoration

== Mascot ==
The Yokohama mascot is named Fulie-maru, an alien-bird like figure. He is, supposedly, a tribute to Yokohama Flugels' mascot, Tobimaru, a flying squirrel.
