= Miloš Rus =

Slovenian footballer and manager

Personal information
- Full name: Miloš Rus
- Date of birth: April 4, 1962 (age 64)
- Place of birth: Logatec, FPR Yugoslavia
- Position: Goalkeeper

Senior career*
Years	Team	Apps	(Gls)
1980–1983	Olimpija		
1984–1986	Slovan		
1987	Elan		
1988–1990	FC Eisenkappel		

Managerial career
- 1997: Brummell Sendai
- 1998: Slavija Vevče
- 1999: Factor
- 2005–2006: Zagreb
- 2009–2012: Slovenia U18
- 2013–2014: Celje
- 2014: Krka
- 2015: Yokohama FC
- 2016: Yokohama FC
- * Club domestic league appearances and goals

Miloš Rus (born April 4, 1962) is a former Slovenian football goalkeeper and manager.

== Managerial statistics ==
Team	From	To	Record				
Team	From	To	G	W	D	L	Win %
Yokohama FC	2015	2015	31	9	8	14	29.03
Yokohama FC	2016	2016	17	5	5	7	29.41
Total			48	14	13	21	29.17
