= Lee Tae-ho (footballer, born 1991) =

South Korean footballer

Personal information
- Date of birth: 16 March 1991 (age 35)
- Place of birth: South Korea
- Height: 1.85 m (6 ft 1 in)
- Position: Centre-back

Team information
- Current team: Seoul E-Land (on loan from Gangwon FC)
- Number: 24

Youth career
- 2010–2012: Sungkyunkwan University

Senior career*
Years	Team	Apps	(Gls)
2013–2014	Montedio Yamagata	54	(0)
2015	Cheonan City	5	(1)
2015	Tochigi SC	13	(0)
2016–2017	JEF United Chiba	30	(0)
2017	→ Kamatamare Sanuki (loan)	6	(0)
2018–	Gangwon FC	11	(1)
2019–	→ Seoul E-Land (loan)	0	(0)

International career
2010	South Korea U20	3	(0)
2014	South Korea U23	2	(0)
Medal record
Representing South Korea
Men's football
Asian Games
Gold medal – first place	2014 Incheon	Team
- * Club domestic league appearances and goals as of 20 July 2019

- Lee Tae-ho
- Hangul: 이태호
- RR: I Taeho
- MR: I T'aeho

Lee Tae-ho (Korean: 이태호; born Lee Joo-young, 16 March 1991) is a South Korean footballer who plays as a centre-back for Seoul E-Land on loan from Gangwon FC. He legally changed his name from Lee Joo-young to Lee Tae-ho in 2018.

== Career ==
He joined Montedio Yamagata in 2013.
