= 2019 J.League Cup final =

2019ＪリーグYBCルヴァンカップ 決勝
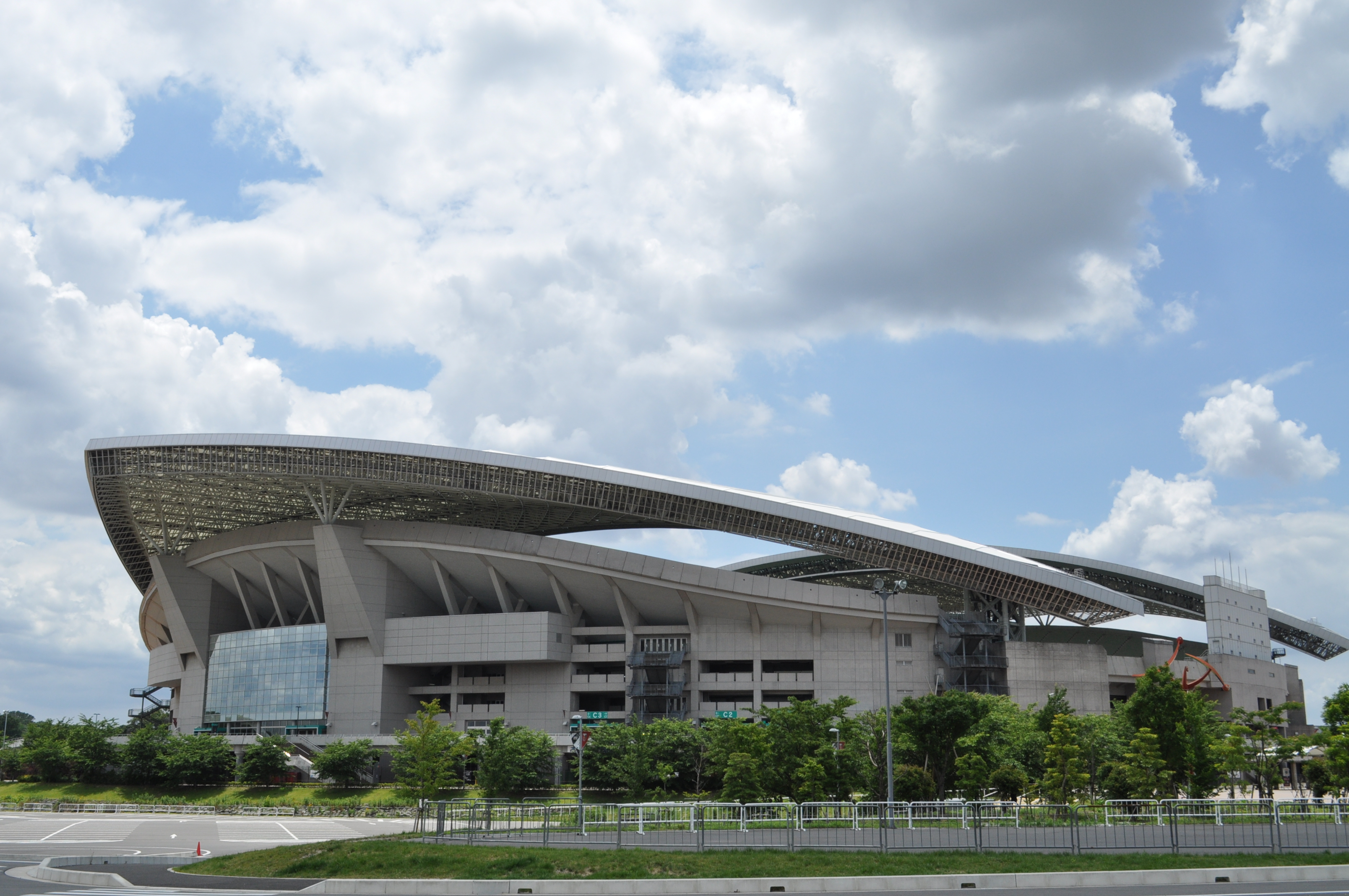
- The match took place at Saitama Stadium
- Event: 2019 J.League Cup
| Consadole Sapporo | Kawasaki Frontale |
| 3 | 3 |
- After extra time Kawasaki won 5–4 on penalties
- Date: 26 October 2019
- Venue: Saitama Stadium, Saitama
- Referee: Yusuke Araki
- Attendance: 48,119
- Weather: Sunny, 25.4 °C (78 °F)

The 2019 J.League Cup final was an association football match between Hokkaido Consadole Sapporo and Kawasaki Frontale on 26 October 2019 at Saitama Stadium. It was the 27th edition J.League Cup, organised by the J.League. Consadole Sapporo were playing in their first J.League Cup final, having never previously made it beyond the quarter-final stage. Kawasaki Frontale were playing in their fifth J.League Cup final, most recently finishing runners-up in 2017 where they lost 2–0 to Cerezo Osaka.

Yusuke Araki was the referee for the match, which was played in front of 48,119 spectators. The match was tied 1–1 at half-time following goals from Daiki Suga and Hiroyuki Abe. Kawasaki scored an 88th-minute goal through Yu Kobayashi but Consadole grabbed a late equalizer to take the game to extra time. Consadole took the lead again in the 99th minute with a free-kick goal by Akito Fukumori, following a foul in which a red-card was shown to Kawasaki defender Shogo Taniguchi. In the 109th minute, Yu Kobayashi scored his second for Kawasaki, tying the game at 3–3. Neither team could find a winning goal so it was decided by a penalty shoot-out. Kawasaki eventually won 5–4 on penalties and were crowned champions of a domestic cup competition for the first time.

As winners, Kawasaki Frontale earned the right to play against the winners of the 2019 Copa Sudamericana in the 2020 J.League Cup / Copa Sudamericana Championship.

== Teams ==
| Team | League | Previous finals appearances (bold indicates winners) |
|---|---|---|
| Consadole Sapporo | J1 League | 0 |
| Kawasaki Frontale | J1 League | 4 (2000, 2007, 2009, 2017) |

== Route to the final ==
The tournament consisted of 20 teams, beginning with a group stage consisting of four groups of four teams. The top two teams of each group would then advance to a two-legged play-off stage. The winners of the play-offs would then be entered into a final knockout stage, alongside four teams that received byes due to their commitments in the 2019 AFC Champions League group stage.

| Consadole Sapporo | | | | Round | Kawasaki Frontale | | | |
|---|---|---|---|---|---|---|---|---|
| Opponent | Result | | | Group stage | Bye | | | |
| Yokohama F. Marinos | 1–1 (A) | | | Matchday 1 | Bye | | | |
| V-Varen Nagasaki | 0–0 (H) | | | Matchday 2 | Bye | | | |
| Shonan Bellmare | 4–1 (H) | | | Matchday 3 | Bye | | | |
| V-Varen Nagasaki | 3–6 (A) | | | Matchday 4 | Bye | | | |
| Yokohama F. Marinos | 0–4 (H) | | | Matchday 5 | Bye | | | |
| Shonan Bellmare | 2–2 (H) | | | Matchday 6 | Bye | | | |
| **Group A winners**: Pos / Team / Pld / Pts; 1 / **Consadole Sapporo** / 6 / **9**; 2 / V-Varen Nagasaki / 6 / **8**; 3 / Yokohama F. Marinos / 6 / **8**; 4 / Shonan Bellmare / 6 / **7**; Source: League table, Match results | | | | Final standings | Bye | | | |
| Opponent | Agg. | 1st leg | 2nd leg | Knockout phase | Opponent | Agg. | 1st leg | 2nd leg |
| Júbilo Iwata | 2–4 | 1–2 (A) | 2–1 (H) | Play-off stage | Bye | | | |
| Sanfrecce Hiroshima | 4–3 | 3–2 (H) | 1–1 (A) | Quarter-finals | Nagoya Grampus | 4–2 | 2–0 (H) | 2–2 (A) |
| Gamba Osaka | 2–2 (a) | 2–1 (A) | 1–0 (H) | Semi-finals | Kashima Antlers | 3–1 | 3–1 (H) | 0–0 (A) |

== Pre-match ==
=== Venue selection ===
The final was hosted in Saitama Stadium, the sixth year in a row that this venue was used in place of the National Stadium whilst the new national stadium was being constructed.

=== Analysis ===
Hokkaido Consadole Sapporo had never reached further than the play-off stage of the J.League Cup. Kawasaki Frontale had been finalists in the competition on four previous occasions, the most recent in 2017. Neither team had ever won a domestic cup. In their only meeting in the 2019 J1 League, they played out a 1–1 draw in Kawasaki. Sapporo had won only one game in their last 24 against Kawasaki in all competitions, with their only previous victory coming in 1998.

Due to their participation in AFC Champions League group stage games, Kawasaki received byes for both the group stage and the play-off stage and therefore played eight less games than Consadole Sapporo in the competition. Sapporo finished top of their group and came through close ties in both the quarter-final and semi-final, knocking out Gamba Osaka in the latter on away goals.

== Match ==
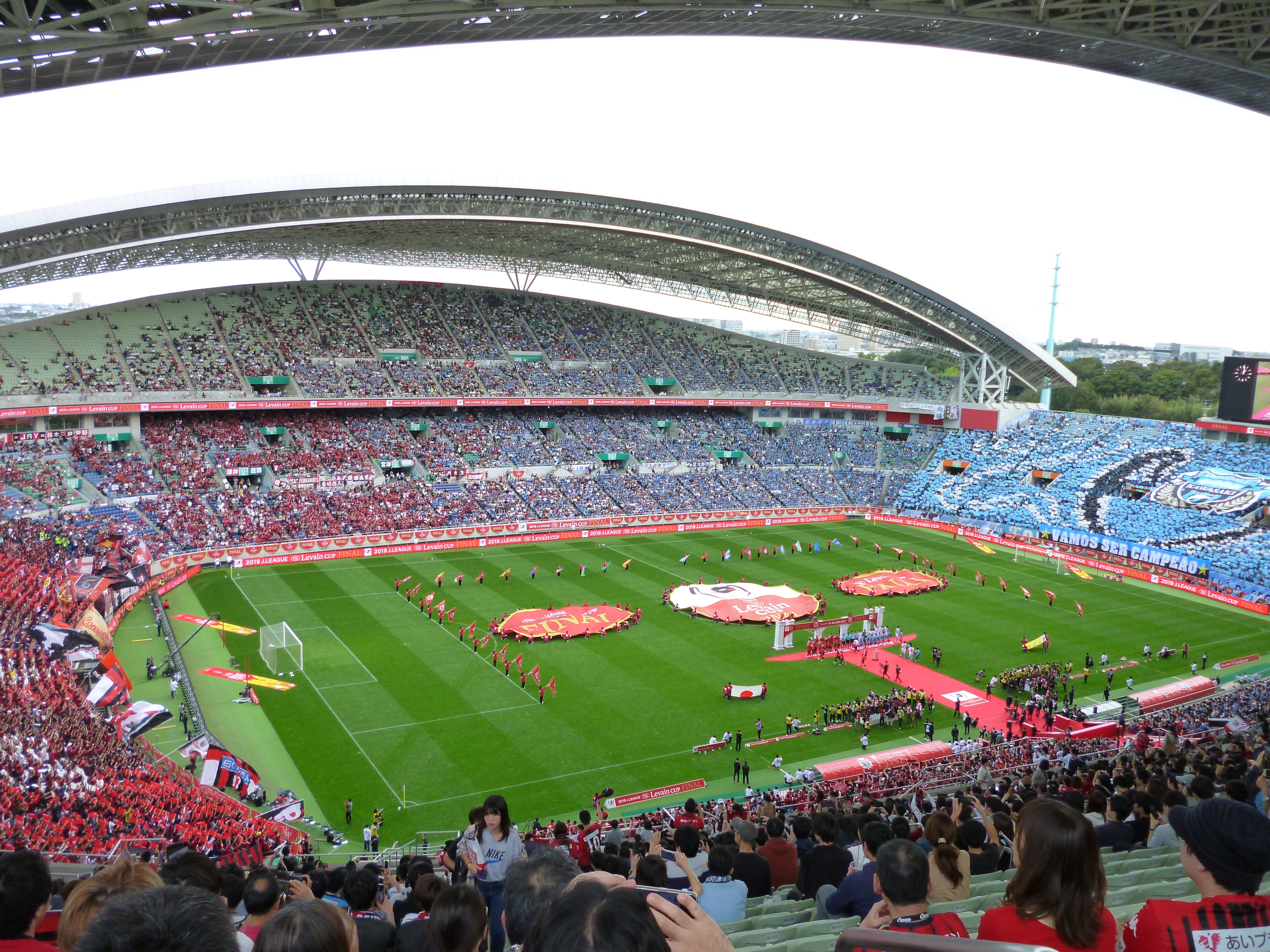
The ceremony before the start of the game as seen from the main stand side. Supporter seats are on the left side for Sapporo (home) and on the right side for Kawasaki (away).

For Consadole Sapporo, Takuma Arano came in to replace their injured captain Hiroki Miyazawa. They lined up in a 3-4-2-1 formation, with Chanathip Songkrasin and cup top-scorer Musashi Suzuki sitting just behind Jay Bothroyd. For Kawasaki, manager Toru Oniki made the decision to bench key players Yu Kobayashi and Kengo Nakamura, lining up in a 4-2-3-1 formation with Leandro Damião the sole striker.

=== First half ===
The game had a tense start with opportunities coming at both ends, however the deadlock was broken by Sapporo in the 10th minute. Kawasaki's Shogo Taniguchi made a headed clearance which fell to left-midfielder Daiki Suga who fired a volley which went into the net off the underside of the bar. Kawasaki then upped the pressure on Sapporo with the best chance falling to Leandro Damião who hit the post from six yards out. In the 44th minute, Sapporo failed to clear a corner and the ball fell to Hiroyuki Abe at the back post who chested the ball down and scored the equalizer for Kawasaki, firing the ball low between the goalkeeper's legs.

=== Second half ===
Kawasaki began to dominate in the second half, with big chances falling to Wakizaka in the 58th and 59th minute, but he could not convert them into goals. Wakizaka was then substituted in the 64th minute for Kengo Nakamura and was soon joined by Yu Kobayashi who replaced Damião in the 73rd minute. In spite of their pressure, it wasn't until the 88th minute that Kawasaki scored their second goal to take the lead. Following a lobbed through ball from Ryota Oshima, substitute Kobayashi chested the ball down and scored past the on-rushing goalkeeper. Deep into injury time, Sapporo managed to score an equalizer to take the game to extra time following a headed goal by Kazuki Fukai from Akito Fukumori's corner.

=== Extra time ===
In the 96th minute with Sapporo's Chanathip through on goal, Shogo Taniguchi made a mistimed challenge just outside the box and following a decision from the VAR, Taniguchi was shown a red card and Kawasaki were down to 10 men. The resulting free-kick was taken by Sapporo captain Fukumori, who scored directly into the top corner to the goalkeeper's right. In the 109th minute in the second half of extra time, Kawasaki scored to take the game to 3–3 with Yu Kobayashi scoring his second goal of the game. Following a corner which Sapporo failed to clear, Kazuya Yamamura volleyed the ball across the goal which Kobayashi bundled in from 2 yards out. Neither team could find a winning goal in extra time, so after 120 minutes of football and six goals scored, a penalty shoot-out would decide the championship.

=== Penalties ===
Kawasaki would take the first penalty, which would be taken in front of the end housing the Kawasaki fans. Captain Kobayashi sent the goalkeeper the wrong way to put Kawasaki 1–0 up. Anderson Lopes took Sapporo's first penalty and after a stuttered run-up, also sent Shota Arai the wrong way. Kazuya Yamamura and Musashi Suzuki both scored the next penalties, followed by Kengo Nakamura and Kazuki Fukai also scoring theirs to take the shoot-out to 3–3. Kawasaki's Shintaro Kurumaya struck the crossbar with his penalty, and following Lucas Fernandes scoring Sapporo's fourth, the pressure was on Kawasaki as they were 4–3 down. Akihiro Ienaga held his nerve to fire his penalty past the outstretched goalkeeper to tie the game at 4–4. With the chance to win the game for Sapporo, Naoki Ishikawa's penalty was saved by Asai and the shoot-out continued. Tatsuya Hasegawa took Kawasaki's sixth penalty and scored into the top left corner. Centre-back Ryosuke Shindo's penalty was saved again by Asai down to the goalkeepers right, meaning Kawasaki won the shoot-out by 5 goals to 4.

=== Details ===
26 October 2019
13:10 JST

| Hokkaido Consadole Sapporo | 3–3 (a.e.t.) | Kawasaki Frontale |
|---|---|---|
| Suga 10'; Fukai 90+5'; Fukumori 99' | Report | Abe 45+3'; Kobayashi 88', 109' |
Penalties
| A.Lopes (penalty scored); Suzuki (penalty scored); Fukai (penalty scored); L. Fernandes (penalty scored); Ishikawa (penalty missed); Shindo (penalty missed) | 4−5 | (penalty scored) Kobayashi; (penalty scored) Yamamura; (penalty scored) Nakamura; (penalty missed) Kurumaya; (penalty scored) Ienaga; (penalty scored) Hasegawa |

Saitama Stadium, Saitama
Attendance: 48,119
Referee: Yusuke Araki

| GK | 25 | (South Korea) Gu Sung-yun |
| DF | 3 | (Japan) Ryosuke Shindo |
| DF | 20 | (South Korea) Kim Min-tae |
| DF | 5 | (Japan) Akito Fukumori (c) | | (substituted off) 106' |
| MF | 19 | (Japan) Kosuke Shirai | | (substituted off) 73' |
| MF | 27 | (Japan) Takuma Arano |
| MF | 8 | (Japan) Kazuki Fukai | | (substituted off) 88' |
| MF | 4 | (Japan) Daiki Suga | (yellow card) 88' | (substituted off) 117' |
| FW | 9 | (Japan) Musashi Suzuki |
| FW | 18 | (Thailand) Chanathip Songkrasin |
| FW | 48 | (England) Jay Bothroyd | | (substituted off) 58' |
Substitutes:
| GK | 1 | (Japan) Takanori Sugeno |
| DF | 2 | (Japan) Naoki Ishikawa | | (substituted on) 106' |
| MF | 7 | (Brazil) Lucas Fernandes | | (substituted on) 73' |
| MF | 23 | (Japan) Yoshihiro Nakano | | (substituted on) 117' |
| MF | 26 | (Japan) Ryota Hayasaka |
| FW | 11 | (Brazil) Anderson Lopes | | (substituted on) 58' |
| FW | 13 | (Japan) Yuto Iwasaki |
Manager:
(Serbia) Mihailo Petrović

| GK | 21 | (Japan) Shota Arai |
| DF | 2 | (Japan) Kyohei Noborizato |
| DF | 34 | (Japan) Kazuya Yamamura |
| DF | 5 | (Japan) Shogo Taniguchi (c) | (red card) 96' |
| DF | 7 | (Japan) Shintaro Kurumaya |
| MF | 10 | (Japan) Ryota Oshima | | (substituted off) 100' |
| MF | 25 | (Japan) Ao Tanaka |
| MF | 41 | (Japan) Akihiro Ienaga | (yellow card) 115' |
| MF | 28 | (Japan) Yasuto Wakizaka | | (substituted off) 64' |
| MF | 8 | (Japan) Hiroyuki Abe | | (substituted off) 91' |
| FW | 9 | (Brazil) Leandro Damião | | (substituted off) 73' |
Substitutes:
| GK | 1 | (South Korea) Jung Sung-ryong |
| DF | 3 | (Japan) Tatsuki Nara |
| DF | 26 | (Brazil) Maguinho | | (substituted on) 100' |
| MF | 22 | (Japan) Hokuto Shimoda |
| MF | 16 | (Japan) Tatsuya Hasegawa | | (substituted on) 91' |
| MF | 14 | (Japan) Kengo Nakamura | | (substituted on) 64' |
| FW | 11 | (Japan) Yu Kobayashi | | (substituted on) 73' |
Manager:
(Japan) Toru Oniki

Assistant referees:
Hiroshi Yamauchi
Ryo Hirama
Fourth official:
Takuto Okabe

**Match rules**

- 90 minutes.
- 30 minutes of extra-time if necessary.
- Penalty shoot-out if scores still level.
- Seven named substitutes.
- Maximum of three substitutions.

=== Statistics ===
| Statistic | Consadole Sapporo | Kawasaki Frontale |
|---|---|---|
| Goals scored | 3 | 3 |
| Total shots | 10 | 19 |
| Shots on target | 5 | 9 |
| Saves | 6 | 2 |
| Corner kicks | 6 | 10 |
| Fouls committed | 10 | 19 |
| Possession | 51% | 49% |
| Yellow cards | 1 | 1 |
| Red cards | 0 | 1 |

== Post-match ==
By winning the match, Kawasaki Frontale won their first J.League Cup in their history. Toru Oniki, the winning manager, said "The players didn't give up until the very end and the supporters really continued to support me by believing in us. I really appreciate that. I am grateful to the players and supporters". His opposite number, Mihailo Petrović said "I've been in Japan for a long time, but looking back on the past finals of the Levain Cup, I think it was one of the best finals. I think the players did their best, and the effort was wonderful. We must be proud of that effort". Kawasaki's Kengo Nakamura thanked Sapporo manager Petrović after the game, saying "We were the ones who won in the end, but I think Sapporo has fought so well. Thank you very much".

One of Sapporo's key offensive players Chanathip admitted post-match that he did not want to take a penalty in the shoot-put due to him missing a vital one in his youth, so was only listed as the ninth potential penalty taker.

The monetary reward to Kawasaki Frontale for winning the trophy was 150,000,000円, with runners-up Consadole Sapporo awarded 50,000,000円.

For his two penalty saves in the shoot-out, Shota Arai was awarded the MVP award and received a prize of 1,000,000円.

As winners, Kawasaki Frontale were due to play the winners of the 2019 Copa Sudamericana, Independiente del Valle, in the 2020 J.League Cup / Copa Sudamericana Championship, however this game was not played firstly due to a scheduling clash with the 2020 Summer Olympics but ended up being suspended entirely due to the COVID-19 pandemic.
