= 2020 J.League Cup final =

2020ＪリーグYBCルヴァンカップ 決勝
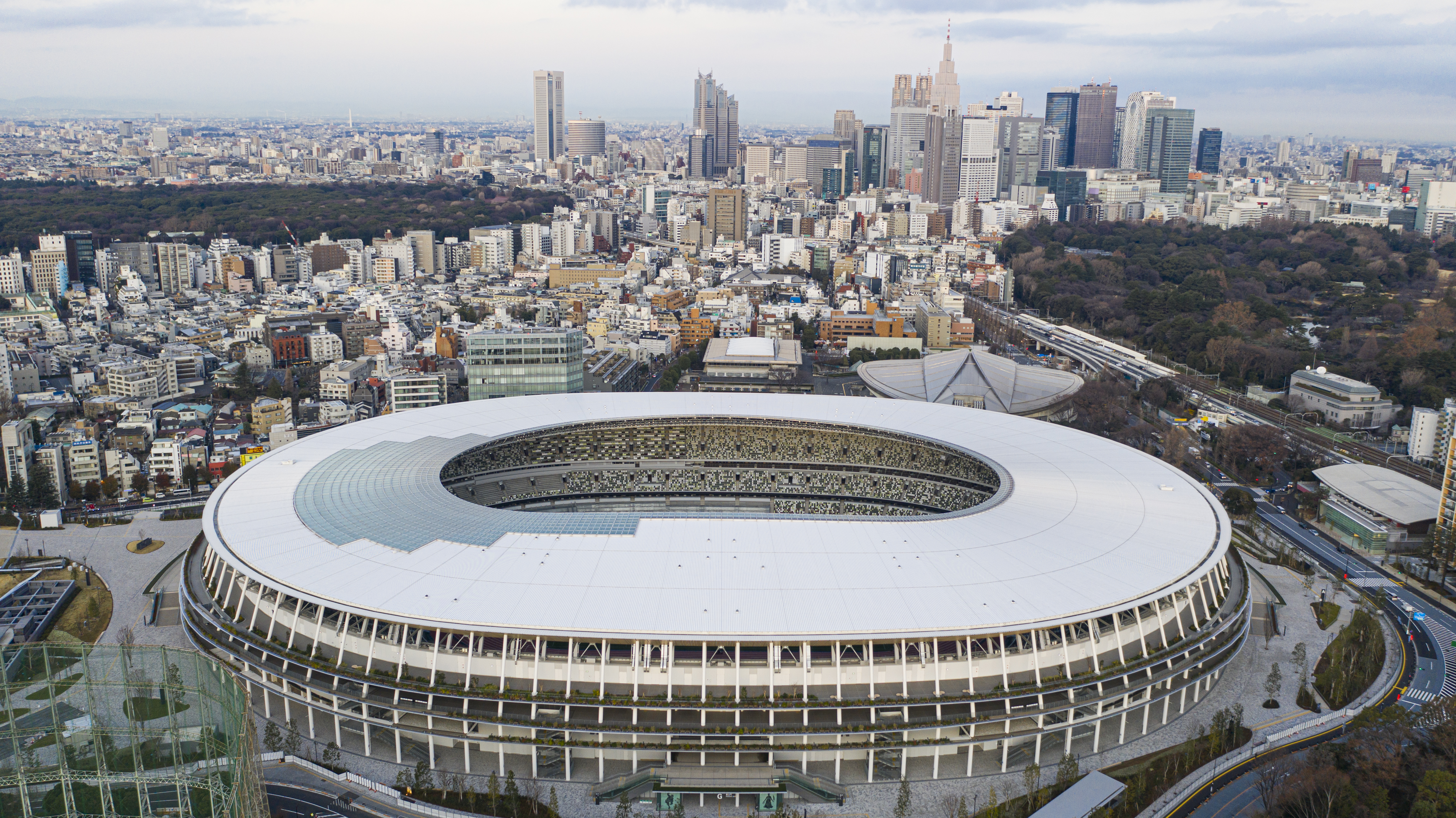
- The match took place at Japan National Stadium
- Event: 2020 J.League Cup
| Kashiwa Reysol | FC Tokyo |
| 1 | 2 |
- Date: 4 January 2021
- Venue: National Stadium, Tokyo
- Man of the Match: Leandro
- Referee: Koichiro Fukushima
- Attendance: 24,219
- Weather: Sunny, 11.4 °C (53 °F)

The 2020 J.League Cup final was an association football match between Kashiwa Reysol and FC Tokyo on 4 January 2021 at Japan National Stadium. It was the 28th edition J.League Cup, organised by the J.League. Kashiwa Reysol were playing in their third J.League Cup final after winning the competition in both of their finals appearances in 1999 and 2013. FC Tokyo were also playing in their third J.League Cup final, following victories in 2004 and 2009.

Koichiro Fukushima was the referee for the match, which was played in front of 24,219 spectators. FC Tokyo scored first through Leandro after 16 minutes, but Kashiwa equalized just before half time through Yusuke Segawa. In the second half, the deadlock was broken by substitute Adaílton in the 74th minute and FC Tokyo held on to claim victory and be crowned champions for the third time in their history.

As winners, FC Tokyo earned the right to play against the winners of the 2020 Copa Sudamericana in the J.League Cup / Copa Sudamericana Championship.

== Teams ==
| Team | League | Previous finals appearances (bold indicates winners) |
|---|---|---|
| Kashiwa Reysol | J1 League | 2 (**1999**, **2013**) |
| FC Tokyo | J1 League | 2 (**2004**, **2009**) |

== Route to the final ==
The tournament consisted of 19 teams, beginning with a group stage consisting of four groups of four teams. Due to the COVID-19 pandemic a number of changes were made to the tournament to reduce the number of games played. This included only playing a single round-robin at the group stage and only playing one-legged ties in the knockout phase. The usual pre-knockout phase play-off games were also cancelled. The winners of each group, in addition to the highest placed runner-up would then be entered into a final knockout stage, alongside the three teams that received byes due to their commitments in the 2020 AFC Champions League group stage.

| Kashiwa Reysol | | Round | FC Tokyo | |
|---|---|---|---|---|
| Opponent | Result | Group stage | Bye | |
| Gamba Osaka | 0–1 (A) | Matchday 1 | Bye | |
| Shonan Bellmare | 1–0 (H) | Matchday 2 | Bye | |
| Oita Trinita | 3–1 (H) | Matchday 3 | Bye | |
| **Group D winners**: Pos / Team / Pld / Pts; 1 / Kashiwa Reysol / 3 / **9**; 2 / Gamba Osaka / 3 / **4**; 3 / Shonan Bellmare / 3 / **3**; 4 / Oita Trinita / 3 / **1**; Source: Table, Results | | Final standings | Bye | |
| Opponent | Result | Knockout phase | Opponent | Result |
| Cerezo Osaka | 0–3 (A) | Quarter-finals | Nagoya Grampus | 3–0 (H) |
| Yokohama F. Marinos | 0–1 (A) | Semi-finals | Kawasaki Frontale | 0–2 (A) |

== Pre-match ==
=== Background ===
Originally scheduled for 7 November, the final was delayed just three days before due to a number of COVID-19 infections amongst the staff and players of Kashiwa Reysol and was rescheduled to 4 January 2021. The J.League were prepared to declare both teams as winners if the new date could not be held for any reason, rather than rearrange again.

=== Venue selection ===
The final was hosted in Japan National Stadium, the first J.League Cup final held in the newly reconstructed national stadium. The final hadn't been held in the national stadium since 2013. The game was played in front of a reduced capacity crowd due to social distancing being in effect.

=== Analysis ===
Kashiwa Reysol had reached the final of the J.League Cup twice before and had won both of those finals – firstly in 1999 and again in 2013. FC Tokyo were also unbeaten in J.League Cup finals appearances, winning the competition in 2004 and 2009. In their meetings in the 2020 J1 League, they won one game each. FC Tokyo won the first game with a 1–0 in Kashiwa but Reysol won their away game 3–1 later in the season. Both teams had a relatively even head-to-head record coming into the final – Kashiwa winning 6 and FC Tokyo winning 4 of their previous 10 meetings.

Due to their participation in AFC Champions League group stage games, FC Tokyo received byes for the group stage of the competition. They comfortably beat Nagoya Grampus 3–0 in the quarter-finals and knocked out 2019 champions Kawasaki Frontale in the semi-finals. Kashiwa finished top of their group, winning all three of their group stage games. Two away wins in the knockout stages meant they came into the final having played five games and only conceding one goal throughout.

== Match ==
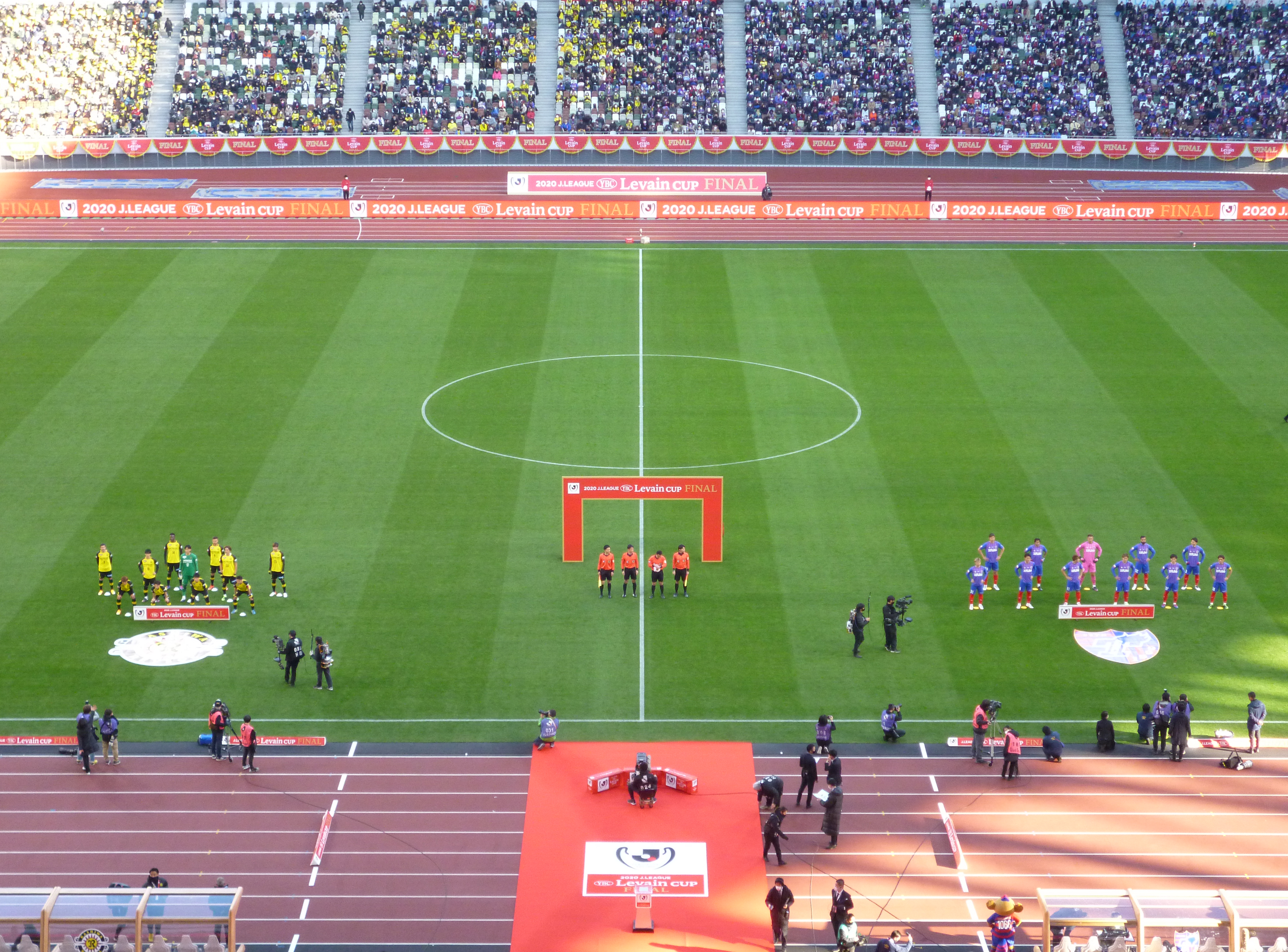
2020 J.League Cup Final teams before kick-off

Kashiwa Reysol's starting forward quartet of Cristiano, Yusuke Segawa, Ataru Esaka and MVP and J.League top scorer Michael Olunga was unchanged from their previous match, the final game of their league season against Kawasaki Frontale. The other personnel changes from their previous game were Richardson coming in to central midfield for Masatoshi Mihara after serving a suspension and Naoki Kawaguchi starting at right-back in place of Kengo Kitazume. Left-back Taiyo Koga was absent from the previous days training, but started the match. Reysol lined up in a 4-2-3-1 formation with Ataru Esaka as captain.

FC Tokyo were without forward Diego Oliveira who scored 10 goals throughout the 2020 season, as well as midfielder Yojiro Takahagi and striker Kyosuke Tagawa. Forward Kensuke Nagai was preferred to Adaílton who was left on the bench, in spite of having scored 11 goals across all competitions in the 2020 season. FC Tokyo adopted a defensive 4-3-3, with Masato Morishige acting as the defensive midfield anchor. Keigo Higashi captained the team – due to injury he would not have been able to play the original date of the final in November, but had recovered in time for the rescheduled date.

=== First half ===
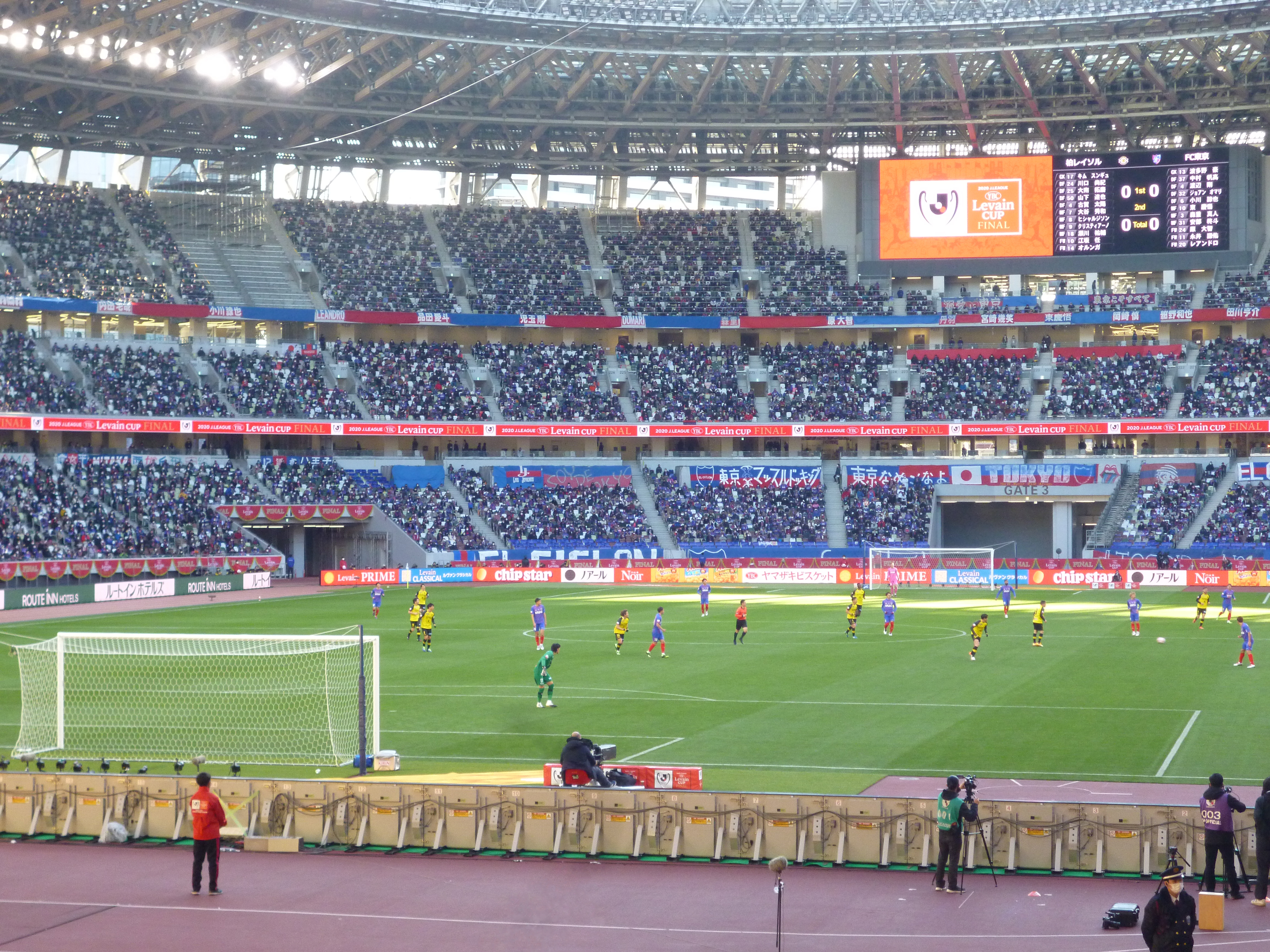
2020 J.League Cup first half

FC Tokyo started the game strongly, winning lots of the second-ball and early shots coming from Leandro and Shuto Abe. The first definitive chance came in the 16th-minute. Ryoya Ogawa won a header in the left back position which put the ball down the left-hand side for Leandro, who dribbled quickly past a sliding tackle from Richardson. He continued his run into the box, cut inside a number of Kashiwa defenders and placed a right-footed shot into the bottom corner of the net to the goalkeepers left and put FC Tokyo 1–0 up. FC Tokyo continued to press and cause problems for Kashiwa down the flanks – it wasn't until after the half hour mark that Kashiwa started to grow into the game. Right at the end of the first half, Kashiwa managed to score an equalizing goal in spite of FC Tokyo's domination. Following a left-sided corner by Cristiano, the ball looped into the air off Michael Olunga which FC Tokyo goalkeeper Go Hatano failed to clear effectively and the ball was stabbed into the net by Yusuke Segawa.

=== Second half ===
Neither team made any changes at half-time and Kashiwa seemed to have the better of the early exchanges. In the 57th minute, Kashiwa created another chance from a corner-kick with Naoki Kawaguchi going close as his volley grazed the crossbar. However FC Tokyo continued to be effective on the counter-attack and almost scored their second goal, with Leandro crashing a central free-kick into the crossbar from around 25 yards out. FC Tokyo made a couple of substitutions in the 67th minute, with Hirotaka Mita and Adaílton replacing captain Keigo Higashi and Taichi Hara. The change quickly paid dividends, as Adaílton scored from a left-footed strike just inside the box, following a poor headed clearance by Takuma Ominami that Kensuke Nagai capitalised on and assisted the goal. Kashiwa pressed from the front for the rest of the game to try and score an equalizer, but even with six minutes of additional time they could not score and the game ended 2–1 to FC Tokyo.

=== Details ===
4 January 2021
14:41 JST

| Kashiwa Reysol | 1–2 | FC Tokyo |
|---|---|---|
| Segawa 45' | Report | Leandro 16'; Adaílton 74' |

National Stadium, Tokyo
Attendance: 24,219
Referee: Koichiro Fukushima

| GK | 17 | (South Korea) Kim Seung-gyu |
| DF | 24 | (Japan) Naoki Kawaguchi |
| DF | 25 | (Japan) Takuma Ominami |
| DF | 50 | (Japan) Tatsuya Yamashita |
| DF | 4 | (Japan) Taiyo Koga |
| MF | 8 | (Brazil) Richardson | (substituted off) 86' |
| MF | 7 | (Japan) Hidekazu Otani | (substituted off) 78' |
| MF | 9 | (Brazil) Cristiano |
| MF | 18 | (Japan) Yusuke Segawa | (substituted off) 78' |
| FW | 10 | (Japan) Ataru Esaka (c) | (substituted off) 78' |
| FW | 14 | (Kenya) Michael Olunga |
Substitutes:
| GK | 16 | (Japan) Haruhiko Takimoto |
| DF | 15 | (Japan) Yuta Someya |
| DF | 20 | (Japan) Hiromu Mitsumaru |
| MF | 27 | (Japan) Masatoshi Mihara | (substituted on) 78' |
| MF | 39 | (Japan) Yuta Kamiya | (substituted on) 78' |
| MF | 33 | (Japan) Hayato Nakama | (substituted on) 86' |
| FW | 19 | (Japan) Hiroto Goya | (substituted on) 78' |
Manager:
(Brazil) Nelsinho

| GK | 13 | (Japan) Go Hatano |
| DF | 37 | (Japan) Hotaka Nakamura |
| DF | 4 | (Japan) Tsuyoshi Watanabe |
| DF | 32 | (Lebanon) Joan Oumari |
| DF | 6 | (Japan) Ryoya Ogawa |
| MF | 10 | (Japan) Keigo Higashi (c) | (substituted off) 67' |
| MF | 3 | (Japan) Masato Morishige |
| MF | 31 | (Japan) Shuto Abe |
| FW | 24 | (Japan) Taichi Hara | (substituted off) 67' |
| FW | 11 | (Japan) Kensuke Nagai | (substituted off) 90' |
| FW | 20 | (Brazil) Leandro |
Substitutes:
| GK | 1 | (Japan) Tsuyoshi Kodama |
| DF | 5 | (Japan) Daiki Niwa |
| MF | 7 | (Japan) Hirotaka Mita | (substituted on) 67' |
| MF | 28 | (Japan) Takuya Uchida | (substituted on) 90' |
| MF | 44 | (Japan) Manato Shinada |
| FW | 15 | (Brazil) Adaílton | (substituted on) 67' |
| FW | 38 | (Japan) Kazuya Konno |
Manager:
(Japan) Kenta Hasegawa

Assistant referees:
Gakushi Karakami
Yosuke Takebe
Fourth official:
Minoru Tojo

**Match rules**

- 90 minutes.
- 30 minutes of extra-time if necessary.
- Penalty shoot-out if scores still level.
- Seven named substitutes.
- Maximum of three substitutions.

=== Statistics ===
| Statistic | Kashiwa Reysol | FC Tokyo |
|---|---|---|
| Goals scored | 1 | 2 |
| Total shots | 12 | 11 |
| Corner kicks | 6 | 0 |
| Fouls committed | 13 | 19 |
| Yellow cards | 0 | 0 |
| Red cards | 0 | 0 |

Source: jleague.jp

== Post-match ==
FC Tokyo won the competition during a period back to 2009, this extending their record of having never been beaten in a J.League Cup final. Kenta Hasegawa, the winning manager, said "I think I was able to give something back to the supporters. I think winning the Levain Cup is the first step. I want to fight for another title next season". He went on to praise Masato Morishige for stepping in as the defensive midfielder which allowed the team "to play a stable game in both offense and defense". This was Hasegawa's first trophy at FC Tokyo. His opposite number, Nelsinho said "I think it turned out to be a very tough match. I think we had a lot of fouls in the first half, and we weren't able to score many goals".

FC Tokyo captain Keigo Higashi spoke in a similar manner to his manager, seeing the victory in this competition as a stepping stone to further success. He said "Last season, we finished second in the league, which was a disappointing experience. I'm happy to finish the season with a win. This is the start for Tokyo. I will never forget the moment I won. I want to win the title as soon as possible." For Kashiwa, both Hidekazu Otani and Yusuke Segawa mentioned the lack of teamwork contributing to their defeat, saying "As a team, we struggled a bit from the start, and there were some players who were playing in the finals for the first time, so I think it was a big deal that we gave the opponent a goal while we were not fully engaged in the game".

The monetary reward to FC Tokyo for winning the trophy was 75,000,000円, with runners-up Kashiwa Reysol awarded 25,000,000円.

For his performance and goal in the final, Leandro was awarded the MVP award and received a prize of 1,000,000円.

As winners, FC Tokyo were due to play the winners of the 2020 Copa Sudamericana, Defensa y Justicia, in the 2021 J.League Cup / Copa Sudamericana Championship, however this game was not played due to a scheduling clash with the 2020 Summer Olympics.
