= 2017 J.League Cup final =

Cerezo Osaka	Kawasaki Frontale
2	0
- Date: November 4, 2017
- Venue: Saitama Stadium 2002, Saitama

2017 J.League Cup final was the 25th final of the J.League Cup competition. The final was played at Saitama Stadium 2002 in Saitama on November 4, 2017. Cerezo Osaka won the championship.

== Match details ==
November 4, 2017

Cerezo Osaka	2–0	Kawasaki Frontale
Kenyu Sugimoto 1'; Souza 90+2'	Report

Saitama Stadium 2002

Cerezo Osaka
GK	21	(South Korea) Kim Jin-hyeon
DF	2	(Japan) Riku Matsuda
DF	14	(Japan) Yusuke Maruhashi	(substituted off) 90+3'
DF	15	(Japan) Yasuki Kimoto	(substituted off) 89'
DF	22	(Croatia) Matej Jonjic
MF	6	(Brazil) Souza
MF	10	(Japan) Hotaru Yamaguchi
MF	16	(Japan) Kota Mizunuma
MF	46	(Japan) Hiroshi Kiyotake
FW	8	(Japan) Yoichiro Kakitani	(substituted off) 84'
FW	9	(Japan) Kenyu Sugimoto
Substitutes:
GK	27	(Japan) Kenta Tanno
DF	5	(Japan) Yusuke Tanaka	(substituted in) 90+3'
DF	23	(Japan) Tatsuya Yamashita	(substituted in) 89'
MF	17	(Japan) Takaki Fukumitsu
MF	24	(Japan) Kazuya Yamamura	(substituted in) 84'
MF	26	(Japan) Daichi Akiyama
FW	19	(Japan) Ryuji Sawakami
Manager:
(South Korea) Yoon Jong-hwan

Kawasaki Frontale
GK	1	(South Korea) Jung Sung-ryong
DF	18	(Brazil) Elsinho	(substituted off) 75'
DF	5	(Japan) Shogo Taniguchi
DF	23	(Brazil) Eduardo
DF	7	(Japan) Shintaro Kurumaya
MF	21	(Brazil) Eduardo Neto	(substituted off) 80'
MF	10	(Japan) Ryota Oshima
MF	14	(Japan) Kengo Nakamura
MF	13	(Japan) Koji Miyoshi	(substituted off) 46'
MF	41	(Japan) Akihiro Ienaga
FW	11	(Japan) Yu Kobayashi
Substitutes:
GK	30	(Japan) Shota Arai
DF	2	(Japan) Kyohei Noborizato
DF	28	(Japan) Ko Itakura
MF	19	(Japan) Kentaro Moriya
MF	16	(Japan) Tatsuya Hasegawa	(substituted in) 46'
FW	20	(Japan) Kei Chinen	(substituted in) 75'
FW	8	(Japan) Hiroyuki Abe	(substituted in) 80'
Manager:
(Japan) Toru Oniki

== See also ==
- 2017 J.League Cup
