= 1997 J.League Cup final =

Kashima Antlers	Júbilo Iwata
7	2
- on aggregate
- Date: November 22, 1997
- Venue: Júbilo Iwata Stadium, Shizuoka
- Date: November 29, 1997
- Venue: Kashima Soccer Stadium, Ibaraki

1997 J.League Cup final was the 5th final of the J.League Cup competition. The final was played at Júbilo Iwata Stadium in Shizuoka on November 22, 1997, and Kashima Soccer Stadium in Ibaraki on November 29. Kashima Antlers won the championship.

== Match details ==
November 22, 1997

Júbilo Iwata	1–2	Kashima Antlers
Masashi Nakayama 74'	Report	Yutaka Akita 33'; Jorginho 86'

Júbilo Iwata Stadium

Júbilo Iwata
GK	12	(Japan) Tomoaki Ogami
DF	2	(Japan) Hideto Suzuki	(substituted off) 81'
DF	28	(Japan) Takuma Koga	(substituted off) 60'
DF	14	(Japan) Takahiro Yamanishi
DF	4	(Brazil) Adilson
MF	8	(Brazil) Dunga
MF	25	(Japan) Yasushi Kita
MF	7	(Japan) Hiroshi Nanami
MF	10	(Japan) Toshiya Fujita
FW	9	(Japan) Masashi Nakayama
FW	29	(Japan) Daisuke Oku
Substitutes:
GK	21	(Japan) Hiroki Kobayashi
DF	26	(Japan) Toshinobu Katsuya
MF	20	(Japan) Kiyokazu Kudo
MF	18	(Japan) Norihisa Shimizu	(substituted on) 81'
FW	33	(Japan) Takanori Nunobe	(substituted on) 60'
Manager:
(Japan) Takashi Kuwahara

Kashima Antlers
GK	21	(Japan) Yohei Sato
DF	4	(Japan) Ryosuke Okuno
DF	3	(Japan) Yutaka Akita
DF	32	(Japan) Akira Narahashi
DF	7	(Japan) Naoki Soma
MF	6	(Japan) Yasuto Honda
MF	23	(Japan) Toshiyuki Abe
MF	2	(Brazil) Jorginho
MF	18	(Japan) Koji Kumagai	(substituted off) 74'
FW	9	(Japan) Hisashi Kurosaki	(substituted off) 80'
FW	8	(Brazil) Mazinho
Substitutes:
GK	1	(Japan) Masaaki Furukawa
DF	5	(Japan) Naruyuki Naito	(substituted on) 74'
FW	11	(Japan) Yoshiyuki Hasegawa	(substituted on) 80'
FW	19	(Japan) Yasuo Manaka
FW	13	(Japan) Atsushi Yanagisawa
Manager:
(Brazil) Joao Carlos

November 29, 1997

Kashima Antlers	5–1	Júbilo Iwata
Naoki Soma 23'; Mazinho 28', 50'; Yoshiyuki Hasegawa 51'; Yutaka Akita 84'	Report	Norihisa Shimizu 73'

Kashima Soccer Stadium

Kashima Antlers
GK	21	(Japan) Yohei Sato
DF	4	(Japan) Ryosuke Okuno
DF	3	(Japan) Yutaka Akita
DF	7	(Japan) Naoki Soma
DF	5	(Japan) Naruyuki Naito
MF	6	(Japan) Yasuto Honda
MF	14	(Japan) Tadatoshi Masuda	(substituted off) 81'
MF	2	(Brazil) Jorginho
MF	10	(Brazil) Bismarck
FW	11	(Japan) Yoshiyuki Hasegawa
FW	8	(Brazil) Mazinho	(substituted off) 81'
Substitutes:
GK	1	(Japan) Masaaki Furukawa
DF	15	(Japan) Ichiei Muroi
MF	18	(Japan) Koji Kumagai	(substituted on) 81'
FW	19	(Japan) Yasuo Manaka
FW	13	(Japan) Atsushi Yanagisawa	(substituted on) 81'
Manager:
(Brazil) Joao Carlos

Júbilo Iwata
GK	12	(Japan) Tomoaki Ogami
DF	20	(Japan) Kiyokazu Kudo	(substituted off) 72'
DF	5	(Japan) Makoto Tanaka
DF	14	(Japan) Takahiro Yamanishi
DF	4	(Brazil) Adilson
MF	10	(Japan) Toshiya Fujita
MF	25	(Japan) Yasushi Kita	(substituted off) 45'
MF	2	(Japan) Hideto Suzuki
MF	7	(Japan) Hiroshi Nanami
FW	9	(Japan) Masashi Nakayama
FW	29	(Japan) Daisuke Oku
Substitutes:
GK	21	(Japan) Hiroki Kobayashi
DF	28	(Japan) Takuma Koga
DF	26	(Japan) Toshinobu Katsuya
MF	18	(Japan) Norihisa Shimizu	(substituted on) 45'
FW	33	(Japan) Takanori Nunobe	(substituted on) 72'
Manager:
(Japan) Takashi Kuwahara

== See also ==
- 1997 J.League Cup
