= 2007 J.League Cup final =

Gamba Osaka	Kawasaki Frontale
1	0
- Date: November 3, 2007
- Venue: National Stadium, Tokyo

2007 J.League Cup final was the 15th final of the J.League Cup competition. The final was played at National Stadium in Tokyo on November 3, 2007. Gamba Osaka won the championship.

== Match details ==
November 3, 2007

Gamba Osaka	1–0	Kawasaki Frontale
Michihiro Yasuda 55'	Report

National Stadium

Gamba Osaka
GK	22	(Japan) Yosuke Fujigaya
DF	21	(Japan) Akira Kaji
DF	5	(Brazil) Sidiclei
DF	6	(Japan) Satoshi Yamaguchi
DF	13	(Japan) Michihiro Yasuda
MF	17	(Japan) Tomokazu Myojin
MF	27	(Japan) Hideo Hashimoto
MF	7	(Japan) Yasuhito Endo
MF	10	(Japan) Takahiro Futagawa
FW	18	(Brazil) Bare	(substituted off) 89'
FW	9	(Brazil) Magno Alves
Substitutes:
GK	1	(Japan) Naoki Matsuyo
DF	2	(Japan) Sota Nakazawa
DF	15	(Japan) Ryota Aoki
MF	8	(Japan) Akihiro Ienaga
MF	16	(Japan) Masafumi Maeda
MF	20	(Japan) Shinichi Terada
FW	11	(Japan) Ryuji Bando	(substituted on) 89'
Manager:
(Japan) Akira Nishino

Kawasaki Frontale
GK	1	(Japan) Eiji Kawashima
DF	5	(Japan) Yoshinobu Minowa
DF	3	(Japan) Hideki Sahara	(substituted off) 74'
DF	2	(Japan) Hiroki Ito
MF	19	(Japan) Yusuke Mori
MF	14	(Japan) Kengo Nakamura
MF	29	(Japan) Hiroyuki Taniguchi
MF	13	(Japan) Shuhei Terada
MF	24	(Japan) Masahiro Ohashi	(substituted off) 63'
FW	16	(North Korea) Chong Te-se	(substituted off) 78'
FW	10	(Brazil) Juninho
Substitutes:
GK	21	(Japan) Takashi Aizawa
DF	4	(Japan) Yusuke Igawa
MF	6	(Japan) Takahiro Kawamura	(substituted on) 74'
MF	8	(Brazil) Francismar
MF	20	(Japan) Yuji Yabu
FW	23	(Japan) Satoshi Kukino	(substituted on) 63'
FW	7	(Japan) Masaru Kurotsu	(substituted on) 78'
Manager:
(Japan) Takashi Sekizuka

== See also ==
- 2007 J.League Cup
