= 2019 J.League Cup =

2019 J.League YBC Levain Cup
2019 JリーグYBCルヴァンカップ
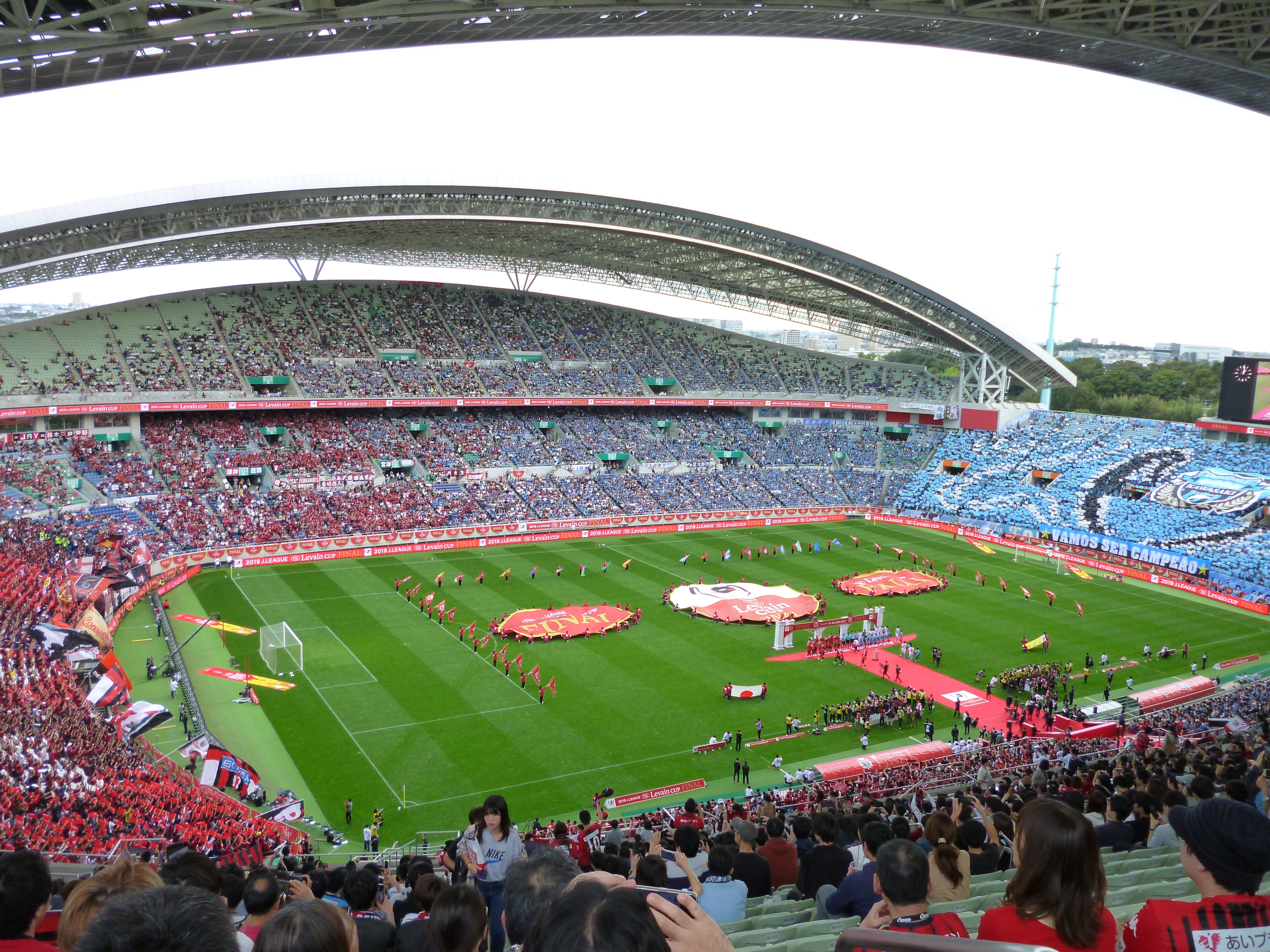
- 2019 J.League Cup Final at Saitama Stadium 2002

Tournament details
- Country: Japan
- Dates: 6 March – 26 October
- Teams: 20

Final positions
- Champions: Kawasaki Frontale (1st title)
- Runners-up: Hokkaido Consadole Sapporo

The 2019 J. League Cup was the 27th J.League Cup, which began on 6 March and ended on 26 October 2019.

The official title is 2019 J.League YBC Levain Cup (2019 JリーグYBCルヴァンカップ) due to the sponsorship of Yamazaki Baking. The winners would have earned the right to play against the winners of the 2019 Copa Sudamericana in the 2020 J.League Cup / Copa Sudamericana Championship, but it would not held due to the 2020 Tokyo Olympics held at the same time.

== Format ==
J.League announced the schedule and the matchdays up to the semifinals on December 14, 2018, and full fixture of the matches including the final (on October 26, at Saitama Stadium 2002) on 23 January, 2019.

All 18 teams playing in the 2019 J1 League participated. In addition, depending on the result of the 2019 AFC Champions League qualifying play-offs, one or two teams from 2019 J2 League with the best performance in the previous season (i.e., Kashiwa Reysol and V-Varen Nagasaki, the 17th- and 18th-placed teams in 2018 J1 League, respectively) may participate.

=== Group stage ===
Participants of 2019 AFC Champions League group stage (ACL) receive byes for the group stage and the play-off stage.

- Kawasaki Frontale and Urawa Red Diamonds received byes for the J.League Cup group stage and play-off stage.
- Sanfrecce Hiroshima and Kashima Antlers will receive byes for the J.League Cup group stage and play-off stage if they win the play-offs of ACL and advance to the ACL group stage. In case either of them advanced to ACL group stage, Kashiwa Reysol will join the J. League Cup group stage. In case both of them advanced to ACL group stage, Kashiwa Reysol and V-Varen Nagasaki will join.

As a result, 16 teams will play the group stage. 16 teams are divided into four groups of four teams by the performance of 2018 J1 League and 2018 J2 League (parenthesized below).

- Group A: Hokkaido Consadole Sapporo (J1 4th), Yokohama F. Marinos (J1 12th), Shonan Bellmare (J1 13th), V-Varen Nagasaki (J1 18th).
- Group B: FC Tokyo (J1 6th), Vegalta Sendai (J1 11th), Sagan Tosu (J1 14th), Kashiwa Reysol (J1 17th).
- Group C: Cerezo Osaka (J1 7th), Vissel Kobe (J1 10th), Nagoya Grampus (J1 15th), Oita Trinita (J2 2nd).
- Group D: Shimizu S-Pulse (J1 8th), Gamba Osaka (J1 9th), Júbilo Iwata (J1 16th), Matsumoto Yamaga FC (J2 1st)
- These groups are the cases when both Hiroshima and Kashima advance to the ACL group stage. In case either or both teams cannot advance to the ACL group stage, they will replace the spot for Nagasaki and/or Kashiwa (other matchups are not replaced).

Each group is played on a home-and-away round-robin basis. Each match will be played for 90 minutes (without extra time).

==== Group stage tiebreakers ====
In the group stage, teams in a group are ranked by points (3 points for a win, 1 point for a draw, 0 points for a loss). If the points are tied, the following tiebreakers are applied:

1. Points in head-to-head matches among tied teams;
2. Goal difference in head-to-head matches among tied teams;
3. Goals scored in head-to-head matches among tied teams;
4. Away goals scored in head-to-head matches among tied teams;
5. If more than two teams are tied, and applying all head-to-head criteria above remains a part of teams still tied, reapply the criteria above only for the tied teams.
6. Goal difference in all group matches;
7. Goals scored in all group matches;
8. Penalty shoot-out if only two teams are tied and they met in the last round of the group;
9. Fewer disciplinary points;
10. Drawing of lots.

In case of ranking third-placed teams across the groups, the following criteria are used:

1. Points;
2. Goal difference in all group matches;
3. Goals scored in all group matches;
4. Fewer disciplinary points;
5. Drawing of lots.

=== Play-off stage ===
The number of play-off stage participants depends on the number of teams advanced to ACL group stage.

- In case four teams advanced to ACL group stage, eight teams (top two teams in each group) will play the play-off.
- In case three teams advanced to ACL group stage, ten teams (top two teams in each group, and two best third-placed teams across the groups) will play the play-off.
- In case two teams advanced to ACL group stage, twelve teams (top three teams in each group) will play the play-off.

The play-off stage is played as two-legged ties of two teams each. The away goals rule, an extra time (away goals rule is not applied for the scores in the extra time), and a penalty shoot-out are used if needed.

=== Prime stage (Knockout stage) ===
The prime stage (knockout stage) is played by 8 teams who advanced to ACL group stage and won the play-off stage.

The quarterfinals and the semifinals are played as two-legged ties (same as the play-off stage). The final is a single game.

The video assistant referee (VAR) system will be used during the knockout stage.

- Due to the difficulty in logistics of the video system by typhoon Hagibis, the use of VAR was cancelled for the match of Kashima Antlers v Kawasaki Frontale (13 October, semifinal second leg), and additional assistant referees are introduced instead.

== Schedule ==
The schedule, except for the final, was announced on 14 December 2018. All matches of the group stage and the play-off stage will be played on Wednesdays.

Stage	Round	1st leg	2nd leg
Group stage	MD1	6 March	
Group stage	MD2	13 March	
Group stage	MD3	10 April	
Group stage	MD4	24 April	
Group stage	MD5	8 May	
Group stage	MD6	22 May	
Play-off stage		19 June	26 June
Prime stage
Prime stage	Quarterfinals	4 September	8 September
Prime stage	Semifinals	9 October	13 October
Prime stage	Final	26 October 2019 (Saitama Stadium 2002)	

== Group stage ==
=== Group A ===
Pos	Team	Pld	W	D	L	GF	GA	GD	Pts	CON	VVN	FMA	BEL
1	Hokkaido Consadole Sapporo	6	2	3	1	13	11	+2	9	—	0–0	0–4	4–1
2	V-Varen Nagasaki	6	2	2	2	10	11	−1	8 (Note: Head-to-head points: V-Varen Nagasaki 4, Yokohama F. Marinos 1.)	3–6	—	3–1	2–1
3	Yokohama F. Marinos	6	2	2	2	9	8	+1	8	1–1	2–2	—	1–0
4	Shonan Bellmare	6	2	1	3	7	9	−2	7	2–2	1–0	2–0	—

Source: League table, Match results
Legend: Blue = home team win; Yellow = draw; Red = away team win.

=== Group B ===
Pos	Team	Pld	W	D	L	GF	GA	GD	Pts	VEG	TOK	SAG	REY
1	Vegalta Sendai	6	3	3	0	9	5	+4	12	—	2–1	1–1	2–1
2	F.C. Tokyo	6	3	1	2	6	4	+2	10	0–0 (Note: F.C. Tokyo played their home matches on Chichibunomiya Rugby Stadium (10 April: vs. Tosu, 8 May: vs. Sendai) and NACK5 Stadium Omiya (24 April, vs. Kashiwa) instead of their regular home stadium Ajinomoto Stadium, since Ajinomoto Stadium was in preparation for 2019 Rugby World Cup on weekdays.)	—	1–0	2–0
3	Sagan Tosu	6	1	2	3	3	6	−3	5 (Note: Head-to-head points: Sagan Tosu 4, Kashiwa Reysol 1.)	1–3	0–1	—	0–0
4	Kashiwa Reysol	6	1	2	3	4	7	−3	5	1–1	2–1	0–1	—

Source: League table, Match results
Legend: Blue = home team win; Yellow = draw; Red = away team win.

=== Group C ===
Pos	Team	Pld	W	D	L	GF	GA	GD	Pts	CER	GRA	TRI	VIS
1	Cerezo Osaka	6	3	2	1	9	4	+5	11	—	3–0	2–0	1–0
2	Nagoya Grampus	6	2	3	1	11	11	0	9	2–2	—	2–1	2–2
3	Oita Trinita	6	2	1	3	7	10	−3	7	2–1	2–2	—	2–1
4	Vissel Kobe	6	1	2	3	6	8	−2	5	0–0	1–3	2–0	—

Source: League table, Match results
Legend: Blue = home team win; Yellow = draw; Red = away team win.

=== Group D ===
Pos	Team	Pld	W	D	L	GF	GA	GD	Pts	GAM	JUB	SSP	YAM
1	Gamba Osaka	6	3	2	1	10	5	+5	11	—	4–1	3–1	2–1
2	Jubilo Iwata	6	3	0	3	6	8	−2	9	1–0	—	0–2	1–0
3	Shimizu S-Pulse	6	2	2	2	8	8	0	8	1–1	1–0	—	2–2
4	Matsumoto Yamaga F.C.	6	1	2	3	6	9	−3	5	0–0	1–3	2–1	—

Source: League table, Match results
Legend: Blue = home team win; Yellow = draw; Red = away team win.

== Play-off stage ==
Team 1	Agg.	Team 2	1st leg	2nd leg
Jubilo Iwata	2 – 4	Hokkaido Consadole Sapporo	1 - 2	1 - 2
Nagoya Grampus	2 – 1	Vegalta Sendai	2 - 0	0 - 1
F.C. Tokyo	2 – 1	Cerezo Osaka	1 - 0	1 - 1
V-Varen Nagasaki	3 – 4	Gamba Osaka	1 - 4	2 - 0

Source: J. League data site

== Prime stage (Knockout stage) ==
The draw for the prime stage was held on July 28 at Fuji TV Odaiba headquarters, Tokyo.

For each tie in the bracket (except the final), the team on top will play the second leg at home.

Quarterfinals
1	Sanfrecce Hiroshima	2	1	3
8	Hokkaido Consadole Sapporo	3	1	4
4	F.C. Tokyo	0	2	2
5	Gamba Osaka (a)	1	1	2
2	Kashima Antlers	3	2	5
7	Urawa Red Diamonds	2	2	4
3	Nagoya Grampus	0	2	2
6	Kawasaki Frontale	2	2	4

Semifinals
Hokkaido Consadole Sapporo(a)	1	1	2
Gamba Osaka	2	0	2
Kashima Antlers	1	0	1
Kawasaki Frontale	3	0	3

Finals
Hokkaido Consadole Sapporo	3 (4)
Kawasaki Frontale	3 (5)

=== Quarter-finals ===
F.C. Tokyo played their home match on NACK5 Stadium Omiya instead of their regular home stadium Ajinomoto Stadium.

Team 1	Agg.	Team 2	1st leg	2nd leg
Hokkaido Consadole Sapporo	4–3	Sanfrecce Hiroshima	3–2	1–1
Gamba Osaka	2–2 (a)	F.C. Tokyo	1–0	1–2
Urawa Red Diamonds	4–5	Kashima Antlers	2–3	2–2
Kawasaki Frontale	4–2	Nagoya Grampus	2–0	2–2

Source: J. League data site

=== Semi-finals ===
Team 1	Agg.	Team 2	1st leg	2nd leg
Gamba Osaka	2–2 (a)	Hokkaido Consadole Sapporo	2–1	0–1
Kawasaki Frontale	3–1	Kashima Antlers	3–1	0–0

9 October 2019	Gamba Osaka	2–1	Hokkaido Consadole Sapporo	Panasonic Stadium, Suita
19:03	Usami 74'; Kurata 90+5'	Report	Kim 87'	Attendance: 8,138; Referee: H. Kimura

9 October 2019	Kawasaki Frontale	3–1	Kashima Antlers	Kawasaki Todoroki Stadium, Kawasaki
19:03	Morita 27'; Wakizaka 82'; Abe 85'	Report	Shirasaki 10'	Attendance: 18,412; Referee: Y. Nishimura

13 October 2019	Hokkaido Consadole Sapporo	1–0	Gamba Osaka	Sapporo Dome, Sapporo
13:03	Suzuki 76'	Report		Attendance: 15,996; Referee: M. Iemoto

13 October 2019	Kashima Antlers	0–0	Kawasaki Frontale	Kashima Soccer Stadium, Kashima
19:03		Report		Attendance: 19,127; Referee: M. Tōjō

Source: J. League data site

=== Final ===
26 October 2019
13:05

Hokkaido Consadole Sapporo	3−3 (a.e.t.)	Kawasaki Frontale
Suga 10'; Fukai 90+5'; Fukumori 99'	report	45+3' Abe; 88', 109' Kobayashi
Penalties
A.Lopes (penalty scored); Suzuki (penalty scored); Fukai (penalty scored); L. Fernandes (penalty scored); Ishikawa (penalty missed); Shindo (penalty missed)	4−5	(penalty scored) Kobayashi; (penalty scored) Yamamura; (penalty scored) Nakamura; (penalty missed) Kurumaya; (penalty scored) Ienaga; (penalty scored) Hasegawa

Saitama Stadium 2002, Saitama
Attendance: 48,119
Referee: Yusuke Araki

== Related articles ==
- 2019 J1 League
- 2019 Emperor's Cup
- 2019 AFC Champions League
