= 2000 J.League Cup final =

Kashima Antlers	Kawasaki Frontale
2	0
- Date: November 4, 2000
- Venue: National Stadium, Tokyo

2000 J.League Cup final was the 8th final of the J.League Cup competition. The final was played at National Stadium in Tokyo on November 4, 2000. Kashima Antlers won the championship.

== Match details ==
November 4, 2000

Kashima Antlers	2–0	Kawasaki Frontale
Koji Nakata 31'; Bismarck 63'	Report

National Stadium

Kashima Antlers
GK	28	(Japan) Hitoshi Sogahata
DF	2	(Japan) Akira Narahashi
DF	3	(Japan) Yutaka Akita
DF	4	(Brazil) Fabiano
DF	7	(Japan) Naoki Soma
MF	6	(Japan) Yasuto Honda
MF	5	(Japan) Koji Nakata
MF	18	(Japan) Koji Kumagai	(substituted off) 89'
MF	10	(Brazil) Bismarck
FW	9	(Japan) Tomoyuki Hirase	(substituted off) 71'
FW	30	(Japan) Takayuki Suzuki	(substituted off) 84'
Substitutes:
GK	21	(Japan) Daijiro Takakuwa
DF	23	(Japan) Jun Uchida
DF	24	(Japan) Kenji Haneda	(substituted on) 84'
FW	11	(Japan) Yoshiyuki Hasegawa	(substituted on) 89'
FW	13	(Japan) Atsushi Yanagisawa	(substituted on) 71'
Manager:
(Brazil) Toninho Cerezo

Kawasaki Frontale
GK	1	(Japan) Takeshi Urakami
DF	4	(Japan) Ryosuke Okuno
DF	36	(Brazil) Daniel
DF	31	(Japan) Junji Nishizawa
MF	34	(Japan) Takeo Harada
MF	7	(Japan) Toru Oniki
MF	23	(Japan) Tomoaki Kuno	(substituted off) 77'
MF	24	(Japan) Taketo Shiokawa
MF	37	(Brazil) Ricardinho
FW	38	(Brazil) Luiz	(substituted off) 66'
FW	27	(Japan) Kazuki Ganaha	(substituted off) 65'
Substitutes:
GK	21	(Japan) Shinkichi Kikuchi
DF	29	(Japan) Takumi Morikawa	(substituted on) 77'
MF	20	(Japan) Yasuhiro Nagahashi
MF	19	(Japan) Akira Ito	(substituted on) 65'
FW	9	(Japan) Yasuyuki Moriyama	(substituted on) 66'
Manager:
(Japan) Hiroshi Kobayashi

== See also ==
- 2000 J.League Cup
