= 2009 J.League Cup final =

FC Tokyo	Kawasaki Frontale
2	0
- Date: November 3, 2009
- Venue: National Stadium, Tokyo

2009 J.League Cup final was the 17th final of the J.League Cup competition. The final was played at National Stadium in Tokyo on November 3, 2009. FC Tokyo won the championship.

== Match details ==
November 3, 2009

FC Tokyo	2–0	Kawasaki Frontale
Takuji Yonemoto 22'; Sota Hirayama 59'	Report

National Stadium

FC Tokyo
GK	20	(Japan) Shuichi Gonda
DF	33	(Japan) Kenta Mukuhara
DF	4	(Brazil) Bruno Quadros
DF	6	(Japan) Yasuyuki Konno
DF	25	(Japan) Yuhei Tokunaga
MF	10	(Japan) Yohei Kajiyama
MF	28	(Japan) Takuji Yonemoto
MF	40	(Japan) Tatsuya Suzuki	(substituted off) 86'
MF	22	(Japan) Naotake Hanyu	(substituted off) 74'
FW	24	(Japan) Shingo Akamine	(substituted off) 60'
FW	13	(Japan) Sota Hirayama
Substitutes:
GK	1	(Japan) Hitoshi Shiota
DF	3	(Japan) Hideki Sahara	(substituted on) 86'
DF	5	(Japan) Yuto Nagatomo	(substituted on) 60'
DF	8	(Japan) Ryuji Fujiyama
DF	15	(Japan) Daishi Hiramatsu	(substituted on) 74'
MF	14	(Japan) Hokuto Nakamura
FW	32	(Japan) Yusuke Kondo
Manager:
(Japan) Hiroshi Jofuku

Kawasaki Frontale
GK	1	(Japan) Eiji Kawashima
DF	19	(Japan) Yusuke Mori
DF	17	(Japan) Kosuke Kikuchi
DF	2	(Japan) Hiroki Ito
DF	26	(Japan) Kazuhiro Murakami	(substituted off) 70'
MF	29	(Japan) Hiroyuki Taniguchi
MF	18	(Japan) Tomonobu Yokoyama	(substituted off) 84'
MF	14	(Japan) Kengo Nakamura
FW	9	(North Korea) Chong Te-se
FW	10	(Brazil) Juninho
FW	34	(Brazil) Renatinho	(substituted off) 79'
Substitutes:
GK	28	(Japan) Rikihiro Sugiyama
DF	13	(Japan) Shuhei Terada
DF	4	(Japan) Yusuke Igawa
MF	6	(Japan) Yusuke Tasaka	(substituted on) 70'
MF	8	(Japan) Satoru Yamagishi
FW	23	(Japan) Kyohei Noborizato	(substituted on) 84'
FW	7	(Japan) Masaru Kurotsu	(substituted on) 79'
Manager:
(Japan) Takashi Sekizuka

== See also ==
- 2009 J.League Cup
