= Kazuki Fukai =

Japanese footballer

Kazuki Fukai 深井 一希
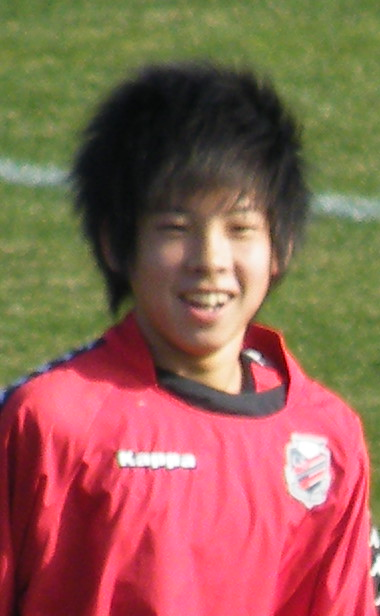

Personal information
- Full name: Kazuki Fukai
- Date of birth: 11 March 1995 (age 31)
- Place of birth: Sapporo, Japan
- Height: 1.77 m (5 ft 10 in)
- Position: Defensive midfielder

Youth career
- –2012: Consadole Sapporo

Senior career*
Years	Team	Apps	(Gls)
2013–2025	Hokkaido Consadole Sapporo	218	(8)

International career
2011	Japan U-17	4	(0)
- * Club domestic league appearances and goals as of 18 July 2022

Kazuki Fukai (深井 一希, Fukai Kazuki) is a Japanese former football player who last played for Hokkaido Consadole Sapporo in the J1 League.

His younger brother Yuki is also a professional footballer currently playing for Hokkaido Tokachi Sky Earth.

== International career ==
In June 2011, Fukai was elected Japan U-17 national team for 2011 U-17 World Cup and he played 4 matches.

== Career statistics ==
Updated to 18 July 2022.

Appearances and goals by club, season and competition
Club	Season	League			Emperor's Cup		J.League Cup		Total	
Club	Season	Division	Apps	Goals	Apps	Goals	Apps	Goals	Apps	Goals
Hokkaido Consadole Sapporo	2013	J2 League	19	0	0	0	–		19	0
Hokkaido Consadole Sapporo	2014	J2 League	3	0	1	0	–		4	0
Hokkaido Consadole Sapporo	2015	J2 League	15	0	1	0	–		16	0
Hokkaido Consadole Sapporo	2016	J2 League	25	0	0	0	–		25	0
Hokkaido Consadole Sapporo	2017	J1 League	5	0	0	0	0	0	5	0
Hokkaido Consadole Sapporo	2018	J1 League	28	2	0	0	0	0	28	2
Hokkaido Consadole Sapporo	2019	J1 League	33	2	0	0	5	1	38	3
Hokkaido Consadole Sapporo	2020	J1 League	20	0	0	0	1	0	21	0
Hokkaido Consadole Sapporo	2021	J1 League	21	2	0	0	4	1	25	3
Hokkaido Consadole Sapporo	2022	J1 League	18	1	1	0	4	1	23	2
Career total			187	7	3	0	14	3	204	10
