= Shota Arai =

Japanese footballer (born 1988)

Shota Arai 新井章太
Personal information
- Full name: Shota Arai
- Date of birth: November 1, 1988 (age 38)
- Place of birth: Chichibu, Saitama, Japan
- Height: 1.85 m (6 ft 1 in)
- Position: Goalkeeper

Team information
- Current team: Vissel Kobe
- Number: 21

Youth career
- Yoshida FC
- 2001–2003: Kamisato FC
- 2004–2006: Shochi Fukaya High School

College career
Years	Team	Apps	(Gls)
2007–2010	Kokushikan University		

Senior career*
Years	Team	Apps	(Gls)
2011–2012	Tokyo Verdy	0	(0)
2013–2019	Kawasaki Frontale	41	(0)
2020–2023	JEF United Chiba	143	(0)
2024–	Vissel Kobe	2	(0)
- * Club domestic league appearances and goals as of 22:43, 19 February 2024 (UTC)

Shota Arai (新井 章太, Arai Shota; born November 1, 1988 in Saitama) is a Japanese footballer who currently plays for J1 League club Vissel Kobe.

== Playing career ==
Shota Arai joined the J2 League club Tokyo Verdy in 2011. He moved to the J1 League club Kawasaki Frontale in 2013. In 2020, he joined JEF United Chiba.

In January 2024, Arai joined J1 League champions Vissel Kobe.

== Career statistics ==
As of 19 February 2024.

Appearances and goals by club, season and competition
Club	Season	League			National Cup		League Cup		Continental		Other		Total	
Club	Season	Division	Apps	Goals	Apps	Goals	Apps	Goals	Apps	Goals	Apps	Goals	Apps	Goals
Japan			League		Emperor's Cup		J.League Cup		AFC		Other		Total	
Tokyo Verdy	2011	J2 League	0	0	0	0	–		–		–		0	0
Tokyo Verdy	2012	J2 League	0	0	0	0	–		–		–		0	0
Tokyo Verdy	Total		0	0	0	0	0	0	0	0	0	0	0	0
Kawasaki Frontale	2013	J1 League	0	0	0	0	0	0	–		–		0	0
Kawasaki Frontale	2014	J1 League	0	0	0	0	0	0	0	0	–		0	0
Kawasaki Frontale	2015	J1 League	23	0	1	0	3	0	–		–		27	0
Kawasaki Frontale	2016	J1 League	5	0	2	0	3	0	–		0	0	10	0
Kawasaki Frontale	2017	J1 League	3	0	4	0	1	0	1	0	–		9	0
Kawasaki Frontale	2018	J1 League	3	0	3	0	2	0	2	0	0	0	10	0
Kawasaki Frontale	2019	J1 League	7	0	2	0	5	0	0	0	0	0	14	0
Kawasaki Frontale	Total		41	0	12	0	14	0	3	0	0	0	70	0
JEF United Chiba	2020	J2 League	42	0	0	0	–		–		–		42	0
JEF United Chiba	2021	J2 League	37	0	0	0	–		–		–		37	0
JEF United Chiba	2021	J2 League	41	0	0	0	–		–		–		41	0
JEF United Chiba	2023	J2 League	23	0	0	0	–		–		0	0	23	0
JEF United Chiba	Total		143	0	0	0	0	0	0	0	0	0	143	0
Vissel Kobe	2024	J1 League	0	0	0	0	0	0	0	0	0	0	0	0
Career total			184	0	12	0	14	0	3	0	0	0	213	0

== Honours ==
=== Club ===
Kawasaki Frontale

- J1 League: 2017, 2018
- J.League Cup: 2019
- Japanese Super Cup: 2019

Vissel Kobe

- J1 League: 2024
- Emperor's Cup: 2024
- J1 100 Year Vision League: 2026

=== Individual ===
- J. League Cup MVP: 2019
