= Tatsuya Yamashita =

Japanese footballer

Tatsuya Yamashita 山下 達也
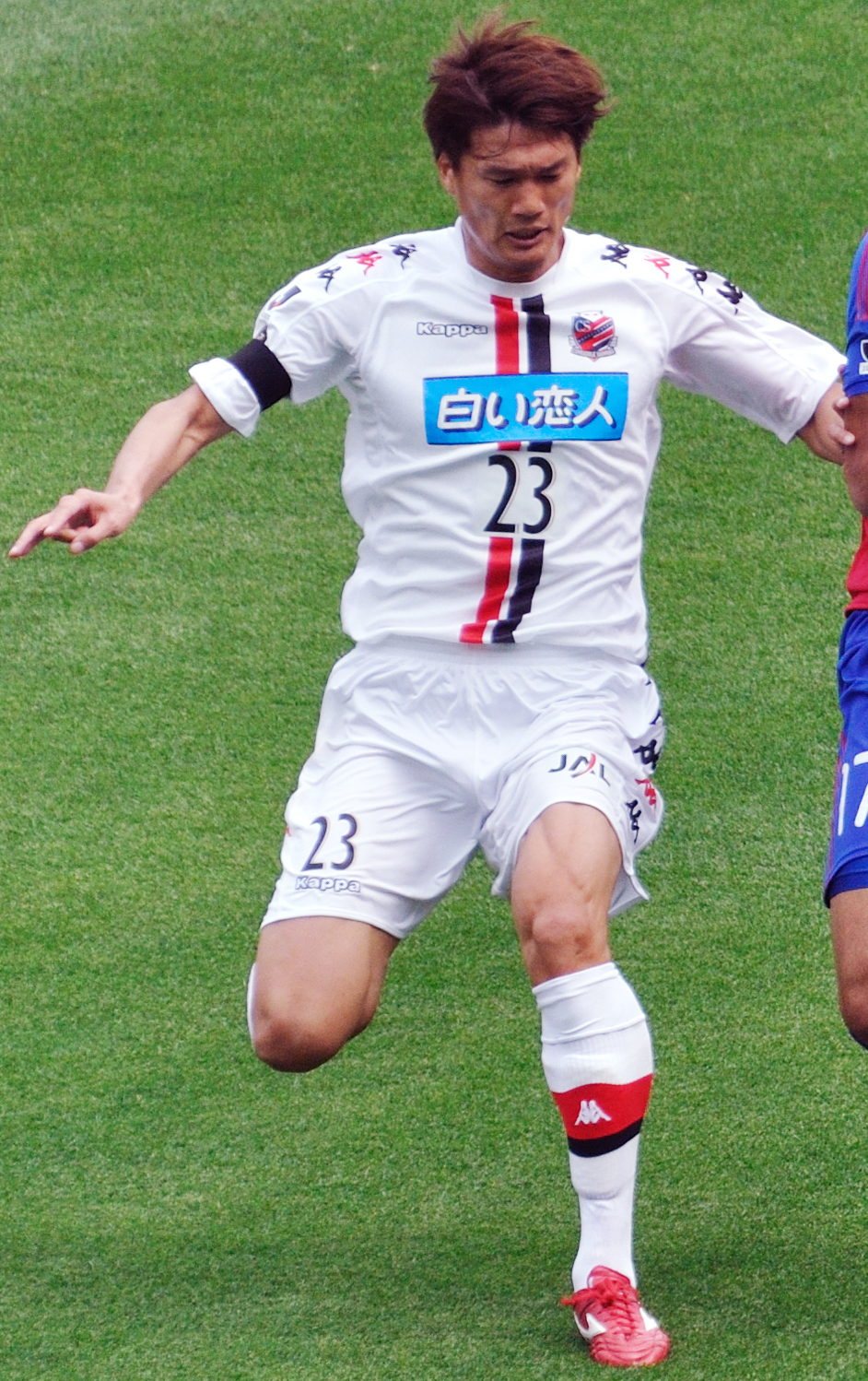

Personal information
- Full name: Tatsuya Yamashita
- Date of birth: November 7, 1987 (age 38)
- Place of birth: Akashi, Hyōgo, Japan
- Height: 1.82 m (6 ft 0 in)
- Position: Centre back

Youth career
- –1999: Akashi FC
- 2000–2002: Okura Junior High School
- 2003–2005: Mikage Kogyo High School

Senior career*
Years	Team	Apps	(Gls)
2006–2010	Cerezo Osaka	17	(0)
2011	Consadole Sapporo	37	(0)
2012–2019	Cerezo Osaka	206	(10)
2019–2021	Kashiwa Reysol	31	(0)
2022–2024	Cerezo Osaka	4	(0)
Total		295	(10)
Medal record
Cerezo Osaka
Winner	J.League Cup	2017
Winner	Emperor's Cup	2017
- * Club domestic league appearances and goals as of 00:20, 6 January 2025 (UTC)

Tatsuya Yamashita (山下 達也, Yamashita Tatsuya; born November 7, 1987, in Hyōgo) is a Japanese former professional footballer who played as a centre back.

A longtime player of Cerezo Osaka, Yamashita played in over 220 games for the club.

== Career ==
=== Second spell at Cerezo Osaka ===
On 27 December 2011, Yamashita was announced as a member of Cerezo Osaka's starting team. On 22 February 2019, Yamashita scored against Vissel Kobe in the 11th minute. This was the first time in J.League history that a defender had scored the first goal of the season in the opening match of the J.League season.

=== Kashiwa Reysol ===
On 11 August 2019, Yamashita was announced at Kashiwa Reysol. On 2 October 2020, in the J.League Cup semi final, he scored the winning goal against Yokohama F. Marinos in the 11th minute. However, Kashiwa lost in the final to FC Tokyo.

=== Third spell at Cerezo Osaka ===
On 12 January 2022, Yamashita returned to Cerezo Osaka.

On 28 July 2023, Yamashita came on as a second-half substitute against Paris Saint-Germain in a friendly match.

On 20 February 2024, Yamashita was announced as captain for Cerezo Osaka for the 2024 season.

On 23 October 2024, Yamashita announced he would be retiring at the end of the 2024 season. He made his final appearance for Cerezo Osaka on 30 November 2024, coming on in the 88th minute for Ryūya Nishio. The match was also his 150th appearance in the J1 League.

== International career ==
On 3 April 2013, Yamashita was called up to the Japan senior team training camp.

== Club statistics ==
Appearances and goals by club, season and competition
Club performance			League		Cup		League Cup		Continental		Other		Total	
Club	Season	League	Apps	Goals	Apps	Goals	Apps	Goals	Apps	Goals	Apps	Goals	Apps	Goals
Japan			League		Emperor's Cup		League Cup		Asia				Total	
Cerezo Osaka	2007	J2 League	7	0	0	0	–		–		–		7	0
Cerezo Osaka	2008	J2 League	8	0	1	0	–		–		–		9	0
Cerezo Osaka	2009	J2 League	1	0	0	0	–		–		–		1	0
Cerezo Osaka	2010	J1 League	1	0	0	0	0	0	–		–		1	0
Cerezo Osaka	Total		17	0	1	0	0	0	0	0	0	0	18	0
Consadole Sapporo	2011	J2 League	37	0	0	0	–		–		–		37	0
Cerezo Osaka	2012	J1 League	9	0	4	0	0	0	–		–		13	0
Cerezo Osaka	2013	J1 League	26	3	3	1	6	0	–		–		35	4
Cerezo Osaka	2014	J1 League	33	1	4	0	2	0	8	2	–		12	3
Cerezo Osaka	2015	J2 League	42	2	1	0	–		–		–		43	2
Cerezo Osaka	2016	J2 League	39	1	2	0	–		–		–		41	1
Cerezo Osaka	2017	J1 League	26	2	1	0	2	0	–		–		29	2
Cerezo Osaka	2018	J1 League	21	0	3	0	2	0	5	0	2 (Note: Appearance in Japanese Super Cup) (Note: Appearance in J.League Cup / Copa Sudamericana Championship)	0	33	0
Cerezo Osaka	2019	J1 League	10	1	1	1	7	0	–		–		18	2
Cerezo Osaka	Total		206	10	19	2	19	0	13	2	2	0	259	14
Kashiwa Reysol	2019	J2 League	10	0	0	0	0	0	–		–		10	0
Kashiwa Reysol	2020	J1 League	19	0	0	0	3	1	–		–		22	1
Kashiwa Reysol	2021	J1 League	2	0	1	0	1	0	–		–		4	0
Kashiwa Reysol	Total		31	0	1	0	4	1	0	0	0	0	36	1
Cerezo Osaka	2022	J1 League	0	0	1	0	1	0	–		–		2	0
Cerezo Osaka	2023	J1 League	0	0	1	0	0	0	–		–		1	0
Cerezo Osaka	2024	J1 League	4	0	2	0	2	0	–		–		8	0
Cerezo Osaka	Total		4	0	4	0	3	0	0	0	0	0	11	0
Career total			295	10	25	2	26	1	13	2	2	0	361	15
