= Naoki Ishikawa =

Japanese footballer (born 1985)

Naoki Ishikawa 石川 直樹
Personal information
- Full name: Naoki Ishikawa
- Date of birth: September 13, 1985 (age 41)
- Place of birth: Kashiwa, Chiba, Japan
- Height: 1.80 m (5 ft 11 in)
- Position: Defender

Youth career
- 2001–2003: Kashiwa Reysol

Senior career*
Years	Team	Apps	(Gls)
2004–2009	Kashiwa Reysol	58	(4)
2009–2010	Consadole Sapporo	51	(1)
2011–2012	Albirex Niigata	54	(2)
2013–2017	Vegalta Sendai	126	(6)
2017–2020	Hokkaido Consadole Sapporo	41	(1)
Total		330	(14)
Medal record
Kashiwa Reysol
Runner-up	Emperor's Cup	2008
- * Club domestic league appearances and goals as of 31 December 2020

Naoki Ishikawa (石川 直樹, Ishikawa Naoki; born 13 September 1985) is a Japanese former professional footballer who played as a defender.

== Playing career ==
Ishikawa was born and raised in Kashiwa. He is a product of the Kashiwa Reysol youth academy, having come up through the ranks into the reserve squad in 2003.

He turned full-time professional with Reysol at the start of the 2004 season and made his first team debut against Kawasaki Frontale on 23 October 2005. He served as players chairperson in 2008. In early 2009, Ishikawa signed a loan deal with Consadole Sapporo. At Consadole, Ishikawa reunited with former Reysol manager Nobuhiro Ishizaki. He quickly became their key player and served as team's captain in 2010.

In 2011, Ishikawa completed a permanent move to Albirex Niigata.

== Club statistics ==
Appearances and goals by club, season and competition
Club performance			League		Emperor's Cup		J.League Cup		Asia		Total	
Season	Club	League	Apps	Goals	Apps	Goals	Apps	Goals	Apps	Goals	Apps	Goals
2004	Kashiwa Reysol	J1 League	0	0	0	0	0	0	–		0	0
2005	Kashiwa Reysol	J1 League	2	0	0	0	1	0	–		3	0
2006	Kashiwa Reysol	J2 League	15	2	1	0	–		–		16	2
2007	Kashiwa Reysol	J1 League	12	0	0	0	4	0	–		16	0
2008	Kashiwa Reysol	J1 League	17	1	2	0	3	0	–		22	1
2009	Kashiwa Reysol	J1 League	12	1	0	0	2	0	–		14	1
2009	Consadole Sapporo	J2 League	20	1	1	0	–		–		21	1
2010	Consadole Sapporo	J2 League	31	0	2	0	–		–		33	0
2011	Albirex Niigata	J1 League	22	1	2	0	3	0	–		27	1
2012	Albirex Niigata	J1 League	32	1	1	0	5	0	–		38	1
2013	Vegalta Sendai	J1 League	27	3	3	0	2	0	4	0	36	3
2014	Vegalta Sendai	J1 League	32	1	0	0	2	0	–		34	1
2015	Vegalta Sendai	J1 League	28	1	1	0	3	0	–		32	1
2016	Vegalta Sendai	J1 League	29	1	1	1	2	0	–		32	2
2017	Vegalta Sendai	J1 League	10	0	1	0	5	1	–		16	1
2017	Hokkaido Consadole Sapporo	J1 League	12	0	0	0	0	0	–		12	0
2018	Hokkaido Consadole Sapporo	J1 League	21	0	2	0	4	0	–		27	0
2019	Hokkaido Consadole Sapporo	J1 League	5	1	0	0	6	0	–		11	1
2020	Hokkaido Consadole Sapporo	J1 League	3	0	0	0	0	0	–		3	0
Career total			330	14	17	1	42	1	4	0	393	16
