= Lucas Fernandes (footballer, born 1994) =

Brazilian footballer

Personal information
- Full name: Lucas Fernandes
- Date of birth: 24 April 1994 (age 32)
- Place of birth: União dos Palmares, Brazil
- Height: 1.74 m (5 ft 8 1/2 in)
- Position: Right winger

Team information
- Current team: Cerezo Osaka
- Number: 77

Youth career
- Real Deodorense
- 2009–2011: Vitória
- 2012–2013: CRB
- 2014: Fluminense

Senior career*
Years	Team	Apps	(Gls)
2013	CRB	1	(0)
2014–2019	Fluminense	13	(0)
2015	→ Bonsucesso (loan)	11	(1)
2015	→ Luverdense (loan)	25	(2)
2016	→ Avaí (loan)	22	(3)
2016	→ Atlético Paranaense (loan)	20	(0)
2017	→ Atlético Paranaense (loan)	14	(0)
2018	→ Paraná (loan)	6	(0)
2018	→ Vitória (loan)	30	(3)
2019	→ Hokkaido Consadole Sapporo (loan)	31	(2)
2020–2024	Hokkaido Consadole Sapporo	108	(7)
2024–	Cerezo Osaka	68	(10)
- * Club domestic league appearances and goals as of 10 August 2026

Lucas Fernandes (born 24 April 1994) is a Brazilian footballer who plays for Cerezo Osaka as a right winger.

== Club career ==
Born in União dos Palmares, Alagoas, Lucas Fernandes represented Real Deodorense, Vitória and CRB as a youth. He made his first team debut for the latter on 28 July 2013, coming on as a late substitute in a 2–0 home win against Luverdense for the Série C championship.

On 13 March 2014, Lucas Fernandes moved to Fluminense, being initially assigned to the under-20s. The following 25 February, he was loaned to Bonsucesso until the end of 2015 Campeonato Carioca.

Lucas Fernandes moved to Luverdense on 24 April 2015, on loan until December. He made his professional debut on 30 May, playing 17 minutes in a 1–2 home loss against Macaé Esporte.

Lucas Fernandes scored his first professional goal on 30 September 2015, netting the game's only in an away success over Ceará. In November, he renewed his contract with Flu.

On 7 January 2016, Lucas Fernandes joined Avaí in a one-year loan deal. After impressing with the side, he moved to Atlético Paranaense on 26 July.

Lucas Fernandes made his Série A debut on 30 July 2016, replacing Yago in a 0–2 away loss against Sport Recife.

On 5 December 2023, Consadole Sapporo announced that it would not be renewing Lucas Fernandes' contract for the 2024 season.

On 10 January 2024, Lucas Fernandes was announced at Cerezo Osaka. During the 2024 J1 League season, he recorded the most assists in the league with 10.

== Career statistics ==
As of match played 28 September 2025

Appearances and goals by club, season and competition
Club	Season	League			State league		National cup		League cup		Continental		Other		Total	
Club	Season	Division	Apps	Goals	Apps	Goals	Apps	Goals	Apps	Goals	Apps	Goals	Apps	Goals	Apps	Goals
CRB	2013	Série C	1	0	0	0	0	0	—		—		—		1	0
Fluminense	2017	Série A	4	0	8	0	0	0	—		1	0	3	0	16	0
Fluminense	2018	Série A	—		1	0	0	0	—		—		—		1	0
Fluminense	Total		4	0	9	0	0	0	—		1	0	3	0	17	0
Bonsucesso (loan)	2015		—		11	1	0	0	—		—		—		11	1
Luverdense (loan)	2015	Série B	25	2	—		0	0	—		—		—		25	2
Avaí (loan)	2016	Série B	8	1	14	2	4	0	—		—		2	0	28	3
Atlético Paranaense (loan)	2016	Série A	20	0	—		0	0	—		—		—		20	0
Atlético Paranaense (loan)	2017	Série A	14	0	—		0	0	—		—		—		14	0
Paraná (loan)	2018	Série A	—		4	0	2	0	—		—		—		6	0
Vitória (loan)	2018	Série A	30	3	—		0	0	—		—		—		30	3
Hokkaido Consadole Sapporo (loan)	2019	J1 League	31	2	—		1	0	8	1	—		—		40	3
Hokkaido Consadole Sapporo	2020	J1 League	31	2	—		—		3	0	—		—		34	2
Hokkaido Consadole Sapporo	2021	J1 League	27	2	—		1	1	8	1	—		—		36	4
Hokkaido Consadole Sapporo	2022	J1 League	28	3	—		0	0	4	1	—		—		32	4
Hokkaido Consadole Sapporo	2023	J1 League	22	0	—		2	0	4	2	—		—		28	2
Hokkaido Consadole Sapporo	Total		139	9	—		4	1	27	5	—		—		170	15
Cerezo Osaka	2024	J1 League	35	3	—		1	0	3	0	—		—		39	3
Cerezo Osaka	2025	J1 League	32	7	—		2	1	4	1	—		—		38	9
Cerezo Osaka	2026	J1 (100)	0	0	—		—		—		—		—		0	0
Cerezo Osaka	Total		67	10	—		3	1	7	1	—		—		77	12
Career total			308	25	38	3	13	2	34	6	1	0	5	0	397	36
