= Kengo Nakamura =

Japanese footballer (born 1980)

Kengo Nakamura 中村 憲剛
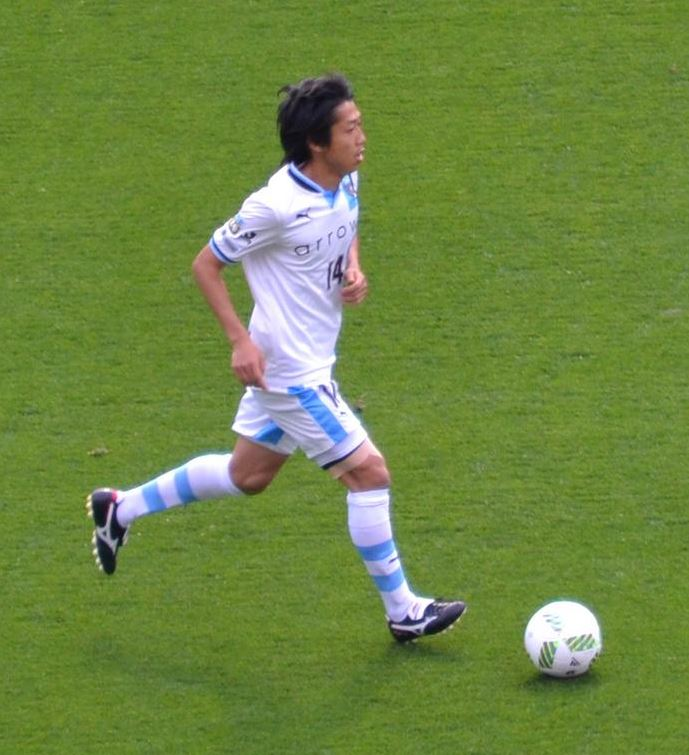
- Nakamura with Kawasaki Frontale in 2016

Personal information
- Date of birth: 31 October 1980 (age 46)
- Place of birth: Kodaira, Tokyo, Japan
- Height: 1.75 m (5 ft 9 in)
- Position: Midfielder

Youth career
- 1996–1998: Kurume High School

College career
| Years | Team | Apps | (Gls) |
| 1999–2002 | Chuo University | | |

Senior career*
| Years | Team | Apps | (Gls) |
| 2003–2020 | Kawasaki Frontale | 546 | (83) |

International career
| 2006–2013 | Japan | 68 | (6) |
Medal record
Kawasaki Frontale
| Winner | J1 League | 2017 |
| Winner | J1 League | 2018 |
| Winner | J1 League | 2020 |
| Runner-up | J1 League | 2006 |
| Runner-up | J1 League | 2008 |
| Runner-up | J1 League | 2009 |
| Runner-up | J.League Cup | 2007 |
| Runner-up | J.League Cup | 2009 |
| Runner-up | J.League Cup | 2017 |
| Winner | J.League Cup | 2019 |
| Runner-up | Emperor's Cup | 2016 |
| Winner | Emperor's Cup | 2020 |
| Winner | Japanese Super Cup | 2019 |
- * Club domestic league appearances and goals

Kengo Nakamura (中村 憲剛, Nakamura Kengo; born 31 October 1980) is a Japanese former professional footballer who played as a midfielder. A one-club man, Nakamura signed with Kawasaki Frontale in 2003 and helped the then J2 outfit earn promotion back to the top flight in 2004, and became a fixture in the ambitious Frontale side that finished second in the J1 League in 2006, 2008 and 2009.

He was named club captain for the first time in 2012, and in the same season lead the league in assists with 13. In 2016, at the age of 36, Nakamura was named both J League MVP and Japanese Footballer of the Year, becoming the oldest recipient of either award. The following season, he was a part of the Kawasaki side that won the J1 League for the first time in the club's history. He would win two more J1 League titles in 2018 and 2020, as well as a domestic double of the Japanese Super and J League Cups in 2019 before retiring at the end of the 2020 season after 17 years and over 500 appearances for the club.

Nakamura was first selected for the Japan national team in 2006 under Ivica Osim and earned his first cap on 4 October in a 1–0 friendly win against Ghana. He scored his first international goal one week later in a 3–0 win over India, and represented his country at the 2007 AFC Asian Cup. After battling through injury, he was named in the Japan squad for the 2010 FIFA World Cup, making one substitute appearance as the side reached the round of 16. In total, Nakamura earned 68 caps and scored 6 goals during an eight-year international career.

== Career ==
=== Youth career ===
Nakamura was born in Kodaira, Tokyo and began playing football in the first grade, joining the Fuchu Boys' Soccer Club in nearby Fuchu. Nakamura played in many tournaments during his youth career, including the 1989 All Japan Youth Soccer Tournament, where Fuchu reached the round of 16, and the 8th Tokyo Boys' Selection Soccer Tournament, where he was named as one of the ten best players. Nakamura continued to play into his teens, and, after graduating from Kurume High School, he enrolled in Chuo University, studying English and American literature whilst also playing for the university football team. In his third year, he became a regular fixture in the squad, despite the team performing poorly, finishing last in the Kanto University League 1st Division and suffering relegation to the 2nd Division. The experienced left Nakamura in tears, but made him more aware of the importance of "mental strength." The following year, He was named club captain and led Chuō to win the 2nd Division, earning promotion back to the top league at the first time of asking. Nakamura graduated from Chuō in 2002 with a Bachelor of Arts in English.

=== Kawasaki Frontale (2003–2020) ===
==== Early years and promotion (2003–2005) ====
Nakamura's work as club captain at Chuō had attracted attention from J League scouts, and he was invited for a trial by Kawasaki Frontale of the Second Division shortly after graduation. He impressed and was signed to a professional contract in early 2003. He made his first appearance on the opening day of the 2003 Division 2 season against Sanfrecce Hiroshima, coming on in the 88th minute to replace Takehito Shigehara. He scored his first professional goal on 9 April, the last in a 5–1 drubbing of Montedio Yamagata. In his first season, Nakamura made 34 league appearances and scored four goals, as well as another two in the 2003 Emperor's Cup.

After playing much of his first season as an aggressive box-to-box midfielder, manager Takashi Sekizuka began switching Nakamura to the role of a playmaker in 2004, a move Nakamura credited as a turning point in his career. Nakamura made 41 appearances and scored 5 times as he cemented himself as a regular starter and Frontale won the league and earned promotion back to the top flight for the first time since 2000. Continuing to play as a starter, Nakamura's first season in the First Division was a modest success, making 29 appearances and scoring 2 goals as Frontale managed to safely avoid any threat of relegation with an 8th-place finish. A respectable performance in the Emperor's Cup was marked by a 3–2 victory over reigning First Division Champions Yokohama F. Marinos on 10 December 2005, with Nakamura scoring the winner in the 97th minute of extra time to take Frontale to the quarter-finals, where they were knocked out by eventual winners, Urawa Red Diamonds.

==== Title contention (2006–2009) ====
The 2006 season was seen as a breakthrough for both Nakamura and Frontale as a whole, as the team looked to expand on their 8th-place finish the previous campaign. Nakamura continued to hold down his starting place in central midfield, scoring 10 goals as the ambitious Frontale became serious challengers for their first ever First Division trophy. Despite falling short to Urawa Red Diamonds and finishing second, the 2006 season was seen as one of many positives for the side and considered to be Nakamura's best yet, as he scored 10 goals from midfield and was named in the J League Best XI along with teammate Hiroyuki Taniguchi, marking the first time any Frontale players had been included. The 2007 season was less successful and saw Frontale's league form take a dip, as they finished fifth and seven points behind fourth place Shimizu S-Pulse. Their league form was however contrasted by a successful Nabisco Cup run to the final, with Nakamura playing in both the semi and eventual final on 11 March, where they lost to Gamba Osaka.

A rejuvenated Frontale bounced back to make another strong challenge for the First Division title in 2008, with Nakamura once again in a pivotal role as their midfield playmaker, providing 11 assists and four goals from midfield as Frontale went head to head with Kashima Antlers in the top two spots. It would however be another year of disappointment, as they missed out on winning the league by just three points. By 2009, Frontale were perennial title challengers as they looked to stop Kashima Antlers from winning a historic three First Divisions in a row. In another closely contended title race, Frontale were once again narrowly beaten by the Antlers, losing out on the first place by just two points. Nakamura enjoyed his most prolific season as a playmaker yet, providing 11 assists and 4 goals, as well as being part of the team that reached the final of the 2009 Nabisco Cup, earning a big quarter final win over Kashima on the way to the final, where they were defeated by F.C. Tokyo.

==== Injury and international recognition (2010–2012) ====
By 2009, Nakamura was considered as Frontale's best known and most popular player, and despite making the J League Best XI three years in a row, was widely seen as one of the most underrated players in the First Division. Nakamura's consistent performances for club and country eventually attracted attention from overseas clubs, with Eredivisie club PSV Eindhoven making an offer for him in late 2009; Nakamura respectfully declined, citing feelings of debt toward Frontale as the club who took a chance on him and gave him the opportunity to become a professional. Nakamura was injured during an AFC Champions League game against Seongnam Ilhwa on 23 February 2010, suffering a Mandibular fracture, casting doubt over his eligibility for selection in the upcoming 2010 FIFA World Cup; Nakamura was however able to make a speedy recovery and was named in Japan's squad, but only made one substitute appearance as Japan were knocked out in the round of 16.

==== Club captain (2012–2017) ====
At the start of the 2012 J1 season, Nakamura was named captain of Frontale for the first time ever, and arguably enjoyed his best season to date, scoring five goals and leading the league in assists with 13. The following season saw him placed in a prolific three man attacking partnership with new signings Yoshito Ōkubo and Renatinho, with Nakamura providing 7 goals and 8 assists as Frontale earned a return to the AFC Champions League for the first time in three years. The 2014 and 2015 seasons were less successful for both club and individual, as Nakamura suffered an ankle injury which would require surgery and caused him to miss the end of the 2014 season. Before his absence, however, Nakamura remained a highlight of the squad as he once again lead the league in assists with 14, and performed well again after his return from surgery in 2015, recording 8 more assists.

The 2016 season was widely seen as the best of Nakamura's career, as he provided ten assists and scored nine goals whilst captaining Frontale to a second-place finish in the J1, the final of the 2016 Emperor's Cup and taking them through to the J1 Championship stage, where they lost in the semi-finals to third place Kashima Antlers. Despite this, Nakamura's efforts were recognised as he was named both J League MVP and Japanese Footballer of the Year, becoming the oldest recipient of either award at the age of 36.

==== Final successes and retirement (2017–2020) ====
At the beginning of the 2017 season, Nakamura gave up the captain's armband, with striker Yu Kobayashi chosen as his replacement. He would however remain a pivotal part of the squad with 6 goals and 12 assists throughout the season. Nakamura's efforts were finally rewarded at the end of the 2017 season, when, after 11 years of trying and three runner-up medals, Frontale won the J1 League for the first time in club history, finally beating longtime title rivals Kashima Antlers on goal difference on the final day of the season. Frontale would become back to back champions the following year, with Nakamura once again featuring heavily with six goals and six assists. The 2019 season would see him sidelined with two separate injuries, however, he was present for both the Japanese Super Cup and J League Cup finals, scoring a penalty in the latter as Frontale did the domestic double and won both.

Shortly after Frontale won the J League Cup, Nakamura announced he would require knee surgery, which he underwent successfully in November, after which he would require seven months of rehabilitation. Nakamura made his return on 29 August 2020, scoring as Frontale defeated Shimizu S-Pulse in a 5–0 victory. On 31 October, his 40th birthday, he scored the winning goal as Frontale extended their unbeaten run to defeat F.C. Tokyo 2–1. A day later, Nakamura announced his intention to retire from the professional game at the end of the season. After winning one more J1 League trophy with Frontale, Nakamura's retirement ceremony was held on 21 December 2020. He remained with Frontale after retirement, and currently works as the club's relations organiser while also occasionally pitching in as a member of the coaching staff.

== Coaching career ==
In April 2024, while completing his Japan Football Association Class S coaching licence, the highest level of coaching in Japan, he joined Canadian Premier League club Pacific FC as a visiting coach until 5 May.

== Style of play ==
Nakamura began his career as a central box-to-box midfielder, but was converted to the role of a playmaker during his second season at Frontale under Takashi Sekizuka, a move he credited as a turning point in his career. He was recognised as a highly efficient passer of the ball, regularly topping the J League for assists throughout his career, as well as being a consistent goal threat and an adept dribbler with determination and strength, despite his relatively small size. His ability on set-pieces has also been praised, both free kicks and penalties.

== Career statistics ==
=== Club ===
As of 27 December 2020

Appearances and goals by club, season and competition
| Club | Season | League | | | Emperor's Cup | | J.League Cup | | AFC | | Other | | Total | |
| Club | Season | Division | Apps | Goals | Apps | Goals | Apps | Goals | Apps | Goals | Apps | Goals | Apps | Goals |
|---|---|---|---|---|---|---|---|---|---|---|---|---|---|---|
| Kawasaki Frontale | 2003 | J2 League | 34 | 4 | 3 | 2 | – | | – | | – | | 37 | 6 |
| Kawasaki Frontale | 2004 | J2 League | 41 | 5 | 3 | 0 | – | | – | | – | | 44 | 5 |
| Kawasaki Frontale | 2005 | J1 League | 29 | 2 | 3 | 1 | 6 | 2 | – | | – | | 38 | 5 |
| Kawasaki Frontale | 2006 | J1 League | 34 | 10 | 2 | 1 | 10 | 3 | – | | – | | 46 | 14 |
| Kawasaki Frontale | 2007 | J1 League | 30 | 4 | 4 | 0 | 3 | 0 | 7 | 3 | – | | 44 | 7 |
| Kawasaki Frontale | 2008 | J1 League | 34 | 4 | 1 | 0 | 1 | 0 | – | | – | | 36 | 4 |
| Kawasaki Frontale | 2009 | J1 League | 32 | 4 | 1 | 0 | 3 | 0 | 9 | 3 | – | | 45 | 7 |
| Kawasaki Frontale | 2010 | J1 League | 27 | 4 | 1 | 0 | 3 | 1 | 3 | 0 | – | | 34 | 5 |
| Kawasaki Frontale | 2011 | J1 League | 30 | 4 | 1 | 0 | 2 | 0 | – | | – | | 33 | 4 |
| Kawasaki Frontale | 2012 | J1 League | 34 | 5 | 1 | 0 | 2 | 0 | – | | – | | 37 | 5 |
| Kawasaki Frontale | 2013 | J1 League | 29 | 7 | 2 | 0 | 5 | 2 | – | | – | | 36 | 9 |
| Kawasaki Frontale | 2014 | J1 League | 30 | 3 | 0 | 0 | 2 | 0 | 8 | 2 | – | | 40 | 5 |
| Kawasaki Frontale | 2015 | J1 League | 33 | 2 | 3 | 0 | 6 | 0 | – | | – | | 42 | 2 |
| Kawasaki Frontale | 2016 | J1 League | 31 | 9 | 4 | 0 | 2 | 0 | – | | 1 (Note: Appearances in the J.League Championship) | 0 | 38 | 9 |
| Kawasaki Frontale | 2017 | J1 League | 32 | 6 | 2 | 0 | 4 | 0 | 9 | 1 | – | | 47 | 7 |
| Kawasaki Frontale | 2018 | J1 League | 33 | 6 | 2 | 0 | 2 | 0 | 2 | 0 | 1 (Note: Appearances in the Japanese Super Cup) | 0 | 40 | 6 |
| Kawasaki Frontale | 2019 | J1 League | 20 | 2 | 2 | 0 | 2 | 0 | 3 | 0 | 1 | 0 | 28 | 2 |
| Kawasaki Frontale | 2020 | J1 League | 13 | 2 | 0 | 0 | 0 | 0 | – | | – | | 13 | 2 |
| Career total | | | 546 | 83 | 35 | 4 | 53 | 8 | 41 | 9 | 3 | 0 | 678 | 104 |

=== International ===
Appearances and goals by national team and year
| National team | Year | Apps | Goals |
|---|---|---|---|
| Japan | 2006 | 3 | 1 |
| Japan | 2007 | 13 | 0 |
| Japan | 2008 | 13 | 2 |
| Japan | 2009 | 12 | 2 |
| Japan | 2010 | 11 | 0 |
| Japan | 2011 | 4 | 1 |
| Japan | 2012 | 7 | 0 |
| Japan | 2013 | 5 | 0 |
| Total | | 68 | 6 |

Scores and results list Japan's goal tally first, score column indicates score after each Nakamura goal.

List of international goals scored by Kengo Nakamura
| No. | Date | Venue | Opponent | Score | Result | Competition |
|---|---|---|---|---|---|---|
| 1 | 11 October 2006 | Bangalore, India | India | | 3–0 | 2007 AFC Asian Cup qualification |
| 2 | 14 June 2008 | Bangkok, Thailand | Thailand | | 3–0 | 2010 FIFA World Cup qualification |
| 3 | 6 September 2008 | Riffa, Bahrain | Bahrain | | 3–2 | 2010 FIFA World Cup qualification |
| 4 | 31 May 2009 | Tokyo, Japan | Belgium | | 4–0 | Friendly |
| 5 | 9 September 2009 | Utrecht, Netherlands | Ghana | | 4–3 | Friendly |
| 6 | 11 October 2011 | Osaka, Japan | Tajikistan | | 8–0 | 2014 FIFA World Cup qualification |

== Honours ==
Kawasaki Frontale

- J1 League: 2017, 2018, 2020
- Emperor's Cup: 2020
- J.League Cup: 2019
- Japanese Super Cup: 2019
- J2 League: 2004

Individual

- Japanese Footballer of the Year: 2016
- J.League MVP Award: 2016
- J.League Best XI: 2006, 2007, 2008, 2009, 2010, 2016, 2017, 2018
- J.League 30th Anniversary Team
