= J.League Cup =

Association football tournament in Japan

J.League Cup （J.League Yamazaki Biscuit Co.Ltd Levain Cup)
- Organiser(s): J.League
- Founded: 1992; 34 years ago
- Region: Japan
- Teams: 60
- Current champions: Sanfrecce Hiroshima (2nd title)
- Most championships: Kashima Antlers (6 titles)
- Broadcaster(s): Fuji TV, SKY PerfecTV! (live matches)
- Website: jleague.jp/cup
- 2026–27 J.League Cup

The J.League Cup (Japanese: Jリーグカップ, Hepburn: Jē-rīgu Kappu), a.k.a. J.League Yamazaki Biscuit Co.Ltd（YBC） Levain Cup (Japanese: Jリーグヤマザキビスケット（YBC）・ルヴァンカップ, Hepburn: Jē-rīgu Yamazaki Bisketto Ruvan Kappu) or YBC Levain Cup (Japanese: ルヴァンカップ、ルヴァン杯, Hepburn: Ruvan Kappu) is a Japanese football knockout tournament organised by J.League, the men's association football league in Japan. It has been sponsored by Yamazaki Biscuits (YBC) of Yamazaki Baking (formerly Yamazaki Nabisco) since its inception in 1992. It was known as the J.League Yamazaki Nabisco Cup (Japanese: Jリーグヤマザキナビスコカップ, Hepburn: Jē-rīgu Yamazaki Nabisuko Kappu) or Nabisco Cup (Japanese: ナビスコカップ、ナビスコ杯, Hepburn: Nabisuko Kappu) until August 2016.

It is generally regarded as the Japanese equivalent to league cup competitions played in many countries, such as the Football League Cup in England, as complementary to the Emperor's Cup competed between clubs from all divisions of professional football in Japan. Before the J. League Cup was created, the old Japan Soccer League had its own Japan Soccer League Cup since the 1976 season.

The tournament format varies almost each year largely depending on the schedule of international matches such as the Olympic Games and World Cup games (see the Format section below).

From 2007 to 2023, the winners qualified for the J.League Cup / Copa Sudamericana Championship held in the following summer, where they played against the winners of the Copa Sudamericana. The tournament was cancelled in 2020 due to the COVID-19 pandemic, but was not held for 2021 and 2022, before ultimately being cancelled in 2023.

== Format ==
=== Early years (1992–1998) ===
1992
The founding ten clubs of the J. League participated as a warm-up to the upcoming inaugural league season. At the group stage, each team played the other teams once. There was no draw and the golden goal, extra time and penalty shootout was employed to decide a tie if necessary. A sudden death was applied to the penalty shoot-out from the first kicker. The winner of a game got four points. A team who scored two or more goals in a game also won one point. The top four teams of the group stage went on to the knock-out stage where the ties were single matches.
1993
Thirteen teams (the ten J. League sides as well as the three JFL sides who had J. League associate membership) took part. At the group stage, the teams were divided into two groups, one consisting seven and the other consisting six. Each team played the other teams in the same group once. The top two teams of each group were qualified for the knock-out stage where the ties were single matches.
1994
Fourteen teams (the twelve J. League sides as well as the two JFL sides who had J. League associate membership) took part. There was no group stage. The ties were single matches all through the competition.
1995
No competition
1996
The sixteen J. League sides participated. J. League associate member teams did not take part due to the congested schedule. At the group stage, the teams were divided into two groups. Each team played the other teams in the same group twice (home and away). A tie was decided by the aggregate of two matches. The winner of a tie got three points and a draw earned one point. The top two teams of each group were qualified for the knock-out stage where the ties were single matches.
1997
Twenty teams (all the J. League clubs and the JFL clubs with J. League associate membership) participated. At the group stage, the teams were divided into five groups. Each team played the other teams in the same group once. A win earned three points, a draw earned one point. There was no extra time at this stage. The top team of each group, as well as the three second-placed teams with the best records, were qualified for the knock-out stage where the ties were played over two matches (home and away). Although Sagan Tosu had forfeited their associate membership because of the bankruptcy of their forerunner Tosu Futures, they were allowed to enter the competition as a special case.
1998
Twenty teams (all the J. League clubs and the JFL clubs with J. League associate membership) participated. At the group stage, the teams were divided into four groups. Each team played the other teams in the same group once. The top team of each group was qualified for the knock-out stage where the ties were single matches.

=== As tournaments for J1 and J2 (1999–2001) ===
1999
All the twenty-six J1 and J2 clubs participated. There was no group stage. The ties were played over two matches (home and away) except the final where the winners were decided by a single game.
2000
All the twenty-seven J1 and J2 clubs participated. There was no group stage. The ties were played over two matches (home and away) except the final where the winners were decided by a single game.
2001
All the twenty-eight J1 and J2 clubs participated. There was no group stage. The ties were played over two matches (home and away) except the final where the winners were decided by a single game.

=== As tournaments for only J1 (2002–2017) ===
2002
All the sixteen J1 teams took part. At the group stage, the teams were divided into four groups. Each team played the other teams in the same group twice. The top two teams of the each group were qualified for the knock-out stage where the ties were single matches.
2003

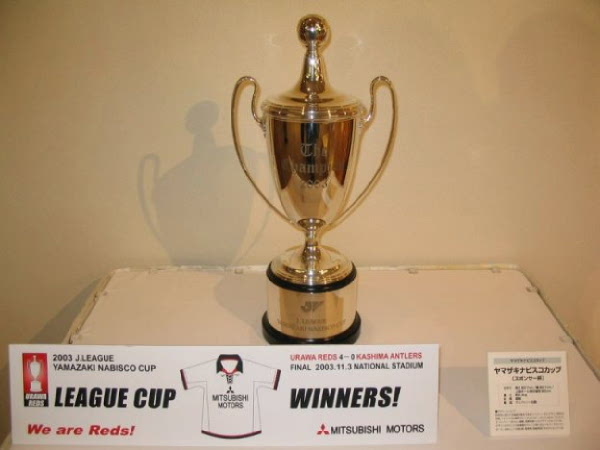
The trophy awarded to Urawa Red Diamonds, 2003 winners

All the sixteen J1 teams took part. Kashima Antlers and Shimizu S-Pulse were exempted from the group stage because they participated in the AFC Champions League. The remaining fourteen teams were divided into four groups, two groups containing four teams and the other two groups containing three. The top team of the each group and the second placed teams of the groups containing four teams as well as Kashima and Shimizu were qualified for the knock-out stage. The ties were played over two matches (home and away) except the final where the winners were decided by a single game.
2004
All the sixteen J1 teams took part. At the group stage, the teams were divided into four groups. Each team played the other teams in the same group twice. The top two teams of the each group were qualified for the knock-out stage where the ties were single matches.
2005
All the eighteen J1 teams took part. Yokohama F. Marinos and Jubilo Iwata were exempted from the group stage because they participated in the AFC Champions League. The remaining sixteen teams were divided into four groups. Each team played the other teams in the same group twice. The top team of the each group and the two second-placed teams with the best records as well as Marinos and Iwata were qualified for the knock-out stage. The ties were played over two matches (home and away) except the final where the winners were decided by a single game. From this year's competition, the golden goal rule was abolished and the extra time was always played for thirty minutes.
2006
All the eighteen J1 teams took part. Gamba Osaka were exempted from the group stage because they participated in the 2006 AFC Champions League. The remaining seventeen teams were divided into four groups, three of them containing four teams and the other containing five teams. Each team played the other teams in the same group twice but only one game was played between some pairs of teams in the group containing five teams. The top team of the each group and the three second placed teams with the best records as well as Gamba Osaka were qualified for the knock-out stage. The ties were played over two matches (home and away) except the final where the winners were decided by a single game. The away goal rule was employed for this year's competition but it was not applied to a goal in the extra time.
2007
The format of the 2007 competition was similar to that of 2006's, but the number of clubs participating from the group stage has been decreased to 16 due to two clubs', Kawasaki Frontale and Urawa Red Diamonds, participation in the 2007 AFC Champions League. See 2007 J. League Cup for details.
2008

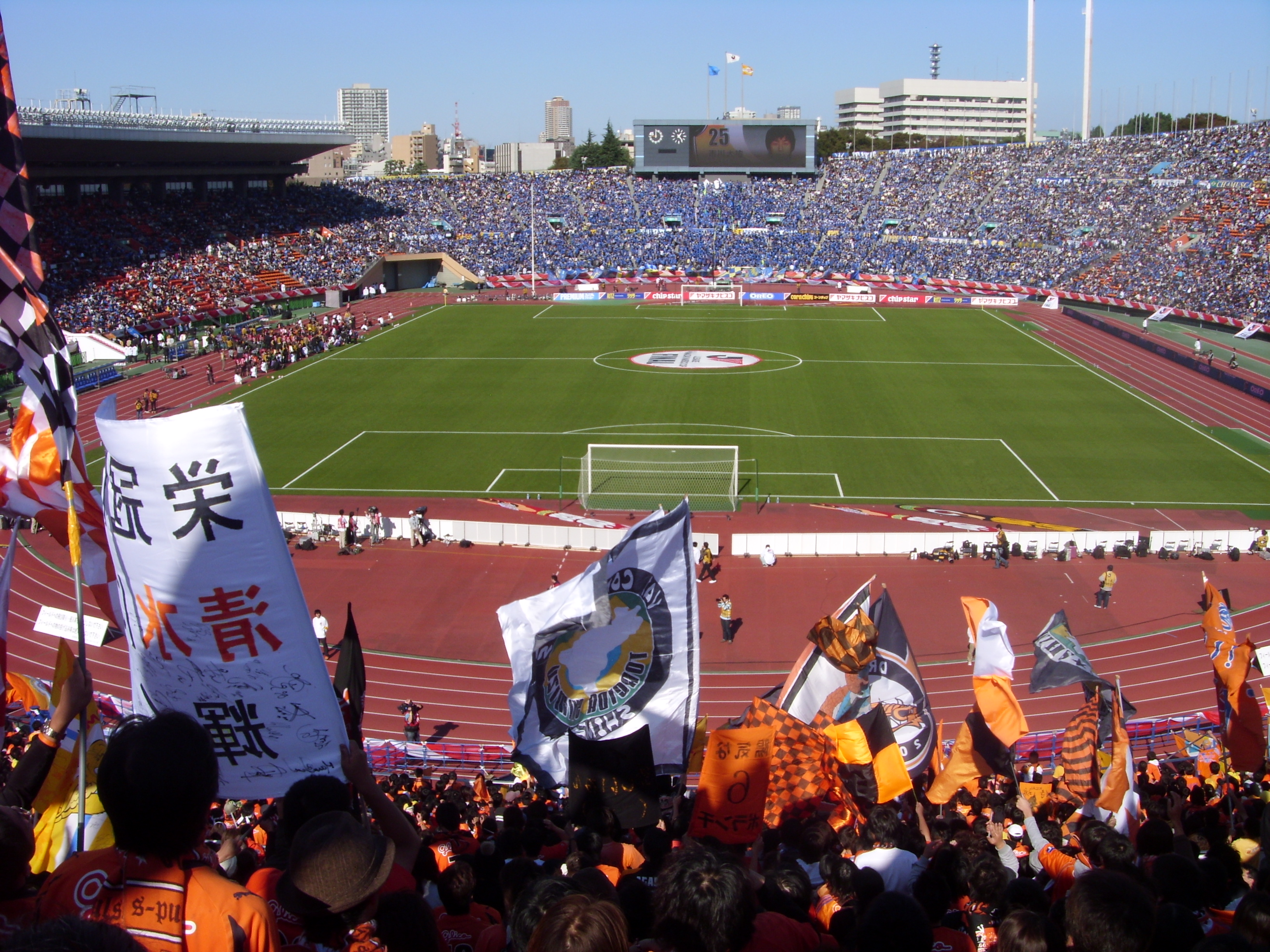
The 2008 Final

The format of the 2008 competition was similar to that of 2007's. See 2008 J. League Cup for details.
2009
The format of the 2009 group stage was changed due to the number of clubs participating 2009 AFC Champions League increased from two to four. 14 remaining clubs were divided into two groups with seven clubs each, then two top clubs of each group were qualified for the knock-out stage. See 2009 J. League Cup for more details.
2010
The format of the 2010 competition was same as that of 2009's. See 2010 J. League Cup for details.
2011
Although the format of the 2011 competition is planned to be same as that of 2009's and 2010's, it was abandoned due to 2011 Tōhoku earthquake and tsunami and replaced by a format without group stage (five knockout stages only). See 2011 J. League Cup for details.
2012–2017
See 2012 J. League Cup, 2013 J. League Cup, 2014 J. League Cup, 2015 J. League Cup, 2016 J. League Cup, and 2017 J.League Cup for details.

=== As tournaments for J1 and J2 (2018–2023) ===
0 to 2 clubs (varies depending on the number of J1 teams participating in the ACL group stage) that were relegated to J2 last year and all J1 clubs can now participate. This is last season of group stage format in 2023.

=== As tournaments for J1, J2 and J3 (2024–present) ===
All of the 60 J. League clubs participated in a full knockout format which started from 2024.

For the 2024 season, the three Japanese clubs qualified for the 2023–24 AFC Champions League knockout stage (i.e. Kawasaki Frontale, Yokohama F. Marinos and Ventforet Kofu) received a bye to the knockout phase, while the remaining 57 J.League clubs were split into 10 groups of five or six for the first three rounds (known as the "first stage") based on their performance in the 2023 league season, with the winners of each single leg single-elimination group advanced to the two-legged play-off round. The five winners of the play-off round will join the three aforementioned clubs in the knockout stage (known locally as the "prime stage"), in which the format was unchanged.

== Prizes ==
- Champions: J. League Cup, YBC Levain Cup, Champion medals and 150 million yen
- Runners-up: J. League Commemorative Plaque, Runner-up medals, and 50 million yen
- 3rd place (2 clubs): J. League Commemorative Plaque and 20 million yen to each 3rd placed club

== Trophy ==
The trophy has been produced by Tiffany & Co. since the third tournament in 1994. The sterling silver trophy, about 56cm tall, includes a soccer ball motif at the tip as a design feature. The tournament names "J.LEAGUE" and "YBC Levain CUP" are engraved on a silver plate attached to its ebony wood base.

== Finals ==
Year	Winners	Score	Runners-up	Venue	Attendance
1992	Verdy Kawasaki	1–0	Shimizu S-Pulse	National Stadium	56,000
1993	Verdy Kawasaki	2–1	Shimizu S-Pulse	National Stadium	53,677
1994	Verdy Kawasaki	2–0	Júbilo Iwata	Kobe Universiade Memorial Stadium	37,475
1995	Not played				
1996	Shimizu S-Pulse	3–3 (a.e.t.) (5–4 p)	Verdy Kawasaki	National Stadium	28,232
1997	Kashima Antlers	7–2 agg. 2–1; 5–1	Júbilo Iwata	First leg: Yamaha Stadium; Second leg: Kashima Soccer Stadium	First leg: 10,437; Second leg: 14,444
1998	Júbilo Iwata	4–0	JEF United Ichihara	National Stadium	41,718
1999	Kashiwa Reysol	2–2 (a.e.t.) (5–4 p)	Kashima Antlers	National Stadium	35,238
2000	Kashima Antlers	2–0	Kawasaki Frontale	National Stadium	26,992
2001	Yokohama F. Marinos	0–0 (a.e.t.) (3–1 p)	Júbilo Iwata	National Stadium	31,019
2002	Kashima Antlers	1–0	Urawa Red Diamonds	National Stadium	56,064
2003	Urawa Red Diamonds	4–0	Kashima Antlers	National Stadium	51,758
2004	FC Tokyo	0–0 (a.e.t.) (4–2 p)	Urawa Red Diamonds	National Stadium	53,236
2005	JEF United Chiba	0–0 (a.e.t.) (5–4 p)	Gamba Osaka	National Stadium	45,039
2006	JEF United Chiba	2–0	Kashima Antlers	National Stadium	44,704
2007	Gamba Osaka	1–0	Kawasaki Frontale	National Stadium	41,569
2008	Oita Trinita	2–0	Shimizu S-Pulse	National Stadium	44,723
2009	FC Tokyo	2–0	Kawasaki Frontale	National Stadium	44,308
2010	Júbilo Iwata	5–3 (a.e.t.)	Sanfrecce Hiroshima	National Stadium	39,767
2011	Kashima Antlers	1–0 (a.e.t.)	Urawa Red Diamonds	National Stadium	46,599
2012	Kashima Antlers	2–1 (a.e.t.)	Shimizu S-Pulse	National Stadium	45,228
2013	Kashiwa Reysol	1–0	Urawa Red Diamonds	National Stadium	46,675
2014	Gamba Osaka	3–2	Sanfrecce Hiroshima	Saitama Stadium 2002	38,126
2015	Kashima Antlers	3–0	Gamba Osaka	Saitama Stadium 2002	50,828
2016	Urawa Red Diamonds	1–1 (a.e.t.) (5–4 p)	Gamba Osaka	Saitama Stadium 2002	51,248
2017	Cerezo Osaka	2–0	Kawasaki Frontale	Saitama Stadium 2002	53,452
2018	Shonan Bellmare	1–0	Yokohama F. Marinos	Saitama Stadium 2002	44,242
2019	Kawasaki Frontale	3–3 (a.e.t.) (5–4 p)	Hokkaido Consadole Sapporo	Saitama Stadium 2002	48,119
2020	FC Tokyo	2–1	Kashiwa Reysol	National Stadium	24,219
2021	Nagoya Grampus	2–0	Cerezo Osaka	Saitama Stadium 2002	17,933
2022	Sanfrecce Hiroshima	2–1	Cerezo Osaka	National Stadium	39,608
2023	Avispa Fukuoka	2–1	Urawa Red Diamonds	National Stadium	61,683
2024	Nagoya Grampus	3–3 (a.e.t.) (5–4 p)	Albirex Niigata	National Stadium	62,517
2025	Sanfrecce Hiroshima	3–1	Kashiwa Reysol	National Stadium	62,466

== Performances by team ==
Club	Winners	Runners-up	Winning seasons	Runners-up seasons
Kashima Antlers	6	3	1997, 2000, 2002, 2011, 2012, 2015	1999, 2003, 2006
Tokyo Verdy	3	1	1992, 1993, 1994	1996
FC Tokyo	3	0	2004, 2009, 2020	
Urawa Red Diamonds	2	5	2003, 2016	2002, 2004, 2011, 2013, 2023
Júbilo Iwata	2	3	1998, 2010	1994, 1997, 2001
Gamba Osaka	2	3	2007, 2014	2005, 2015, 2016
Sanfrecce Hiroshima	2	2	2022, 2025	2010, 2014
JEF United Chiba	2	1	2005, 2006	1998
Kashiwa Reysol	2	2	1999, 2013	2020, 2025
Nagoya Grampus	2	0	2021, 2024	
Shimizu S-Pulse	1	4	1996	1992, 1993, 2008, 2012
Kawasaki Frontale	1	4	2019	2000, 2007, 2009, 2017
Cerezo Osaka	1	2	2017	2021, 2022
Yokohama F. Marinos	1	1	2001	2018
Oita Trinita	1	0	2008	
Shonan Bellmare	1	0	2018	
Avispa Fukuoka	1	0	2023	
Hokkaido Consadole Sapporo	0	1		2019
Albirex Niigata	0	1		2024

== Most valuable players ==
Year	Winner	Club	Nationality
1992	Kazuyoshi Miura	Verdy Kawasaki	Japan
1993	Bismarck	Verdy Kawasaki	Brazil
1994	Bismarck	Verdy Kawasaki	Brazil
1996	Santos	Shimizu S-Pulse	Brazil
1997	Jorginho	Kashima Antlers	Brazil
1998	Nobuo Kawaguchi	Júbilo Iwata	Japan
1999	Takeshi Watanabe	Kashiwa Reysol	Japan
2000	Koji Nakata	Kashima Antlers	Japan
2001	Tatsuya Enomoto	Yokohama F. Marinos	Japan
2002	Mitsuo Ogasawara	Kashima Antlers	Japan
2003	Tatsuya Tanaka	Urawa Red Diamonds	Japan
2004	Yoichi Doi	FC Tokyo	Japan
2005	Tomonori Tateishi	JEF United Chiba	Japan
2006	Koki Mizuno	JEF United Chiba	Japan
2007	Michihiro Yasuda	Gamba Osaka	Japan
2008	Daiki Takamatsu	Oita Trinita	Japan
2009	Takuji Yonemoto	FC Tokyo	Japan
2010	Ryoichi Maeda	Júbilo Iwata	Japan
2011	Yuya Osako	Kashima Antlers	Japan
2012	Gaku Shibasaki	Kashima Antlers	Japan
2013	Masato Kudo	Kashiwa Reysol	Japan
2014	Patric	Gamba Osaka	Brazil
2015	Mitsuo Ogasawara	Kashima Antlers	Japan
2016	Tadanari Lee	Urawa Red Diamonds	Japan
2017	Kenyu Sugimoto	Cerezo Osaka	Japan
2018	Daiki Sugioka	Shonan Bellmare	Japan
2019	Shota Arai	Kawasaki Frontale	Japan
2020	Leandro	FC Tokyo	Brazil
2021	Sho Inagaki	Nagoya Grampus	Japan
2022	Pieros Sotiriou	Sanfrecce Hiroshima	Cyprus
2023	Hiroyuki Mae	Avispa Fukuoka	Japan
2024	Mitchell Langerak	Nagoya Grampus	Australia
2025	Hayato Araki	Sanfrecce Hiroshima	Japan

== New Hero Award ==
This award is presented to an under-23 player who made the biggest contribution to his team in the competition. The winner is decided based on votes from football journalists.

Year	Winner	Club
1996	Hiroshi Nanami	Júbilo Iwata
1996	Toshihide Saito	Shimizu S-Pulse
1997	Atsuhiro Miura	Yokohama Flügels
1998	Naohiro Takahara	Júbilo Iwata
1999	Yukihiko Sato	FC Tokyo
2000	Takayuki Suzuki	Kashima Antlers
2001	Hitoshi Sogahata	Kashima Antlers
2002	Keisuke Tsuboi	Urawa Red Diamonds
2003	Tatsuya Tanaka	Urawa Red Diamonds
2004	Makoto Hasebe	Urawa Red Diamonds
2005	Yuki Abe	JEF United Chiba
2006	Hiroyuki Taniguchi	Kawasaki Frontale
2007	Michihiro Yasuda	Gamba Osaka
2008	Mu Kanazaki	Oita Trinita
2009	Takuji Yonemoto	FC Tokyo
2010	Yojiro Takahagi	Sanfrecce Hiroshima
2011	Genki Haraguchi	Urawa Red Diamonds
2012	Hideki Ishige	Shimizu S-Pulse
2013	Manabu Saitō	Yokohama F. Marinos
2014	Takashi Usami	Gamba Osaka
2015	Shuhei Akasaki	Kashima Antlers
2016	Yosuke Ideguchi	Gamba Osaka
2017	Takuma Nishimura	Vegalta Sendai
2018	Keita Endo	Yokohama F. Marinos
2019	Keito Nakamura	Gamba Osaka
2020	Ayumu Seko	Cerezo Osaka
2021	Zion Suzuki	Urawa Red Diamonds
2022	Sota Kitano	Cerezo Osaka
2023	Jumpei Hayakawa	Urawa Red Diamonds
2024	Riku Yamane	Yokohama F. Marinos
2025	Yotaro Nakajima	Sanfrecce Hiroshima

== Broadcasters ==
=== Japan ===
All matches of the competition is currently broadcast live by Fuji TV and SKY PerfecTV! respectively.

=== Outside Japan ===
YouTube only broadcast live coverage in prime stage matches through J.League International channel (excluding China, Hong Kong, Thailand, and Brazil).

== See also ==
- Sport in Japan
- Football in Japan
- Japan Football Association (JFA)
