= 2011 Kashima Antlers season =

Kashima Antlers
2011 season
- Manager: Oswaldo de Oliveira
- J.League Division 1: 6th
- Emperor's Cup: Fourth round
- J.League Cup: Champions
- Super Cup: Runners-up
- AFC Champions League: Round of 16
Home colours	Away colours

The 2011 Kashima Antlers season was Kashima Antlers's 19th season in J.League Division 1 and 23rd season overall in the top flight (counting the Japan Soccer League and participation in the inaugural J.League Cup). It also included the 2011 J.League Cup, 2011 Emperor's Cup, and the 2011 AFC Champions League. They finished the season 6th in the championship and lost the chance to break the record of 7 championships they share with Tokyo Verdy.

== Players ==
=== Current squad ===
As of 15 December 2010 Note: Flags indicate national team as defined under FIFA eligibility rules; some limited exceptions apply. Players may hold more than one non-FIFA nationality.

No.	Pos.	Nation	Player
1	GK	JPN	Tetsu Sugiyama
3	DF	JPN	Daiki Iwamasa
5	DF	BRA	Alex
6	MF	JPN	Kōji Nakata
7	DF	JPN	Toru Araiba
8	MF	JPN	Takuya Nozawa
9	FW	JPN	Yuya Osako
10	MF	JPN	Masashi Motoyama
11	MF	BRA	Fellype Gabriel
13	FW	JPN	Shinzo Koroki
14	MF	JPN	Chikashi Masuda
15	MF	JPN	Takeshi Aoki
16	MF	JPN	Takuya Honda
18	FW	BRA	Carlão

No.	Pos.	Nation	Player
19	DF	JPN	Masahiko Inoha
20	MF	JPN	Gaku Shibasaki
21	GK	JPN	Hitoshi Sogahata
22	DF	JPN	Daigo Nishi
23	DF	JPN	Gen Shoji
24	DF	JPN	Takefumi Toma
25	MF	JPN	Yasushi Endo
26	MF	JPN	Kenji Koyano
27	MF	JPN	Takahide Umebachi
28	MF	JPN	Shouma Doi
29	GK	JPN	Akihiro Sato
30	FW	JPN	Yuzo Tashiro
31	GK	JPN	Naoki Yagi
40	MF	JPN	Mitsuo Ogasawara

=== Out on loan ===
Note: Flags indicate national team as defined under FIFA eligibility rules; some limited exceptions apply. Players may hold more than one non-FIFA nationality.

No.	Pos.	Nation	Player
—	GK	JPN	Shinichiro Kawamata (to Vegalta Sendai)
—	DF	JPN	Tomohiko Miyazaki (to Yokohama F.C.)
—	MF	JPN	Shuto Suzuki (to Tochigi S.C.)
—	MF	JPN	Daichi Kawashima (to Montedio Yamagata)
—	FW	JPN	Ryuta Sasaki (to Shonan Bellmare)

=== 2011 season transfers ===
In Note: Flags indicate national team as defined under FIFA eligibility rules; some limited exceptions apply. Players may hold more than one non-FIFA nationality.

No.	Pos.	Nation	Player
5	DF	BRA	Alex (Transferred from JEF United Ichihara Chiba)
14	MF	JPN	Chikashi Masuda (Loan return from Montedio Yamagata)
16	MF	JPN	Takuya Honda (Transferred from Shimizu S-Pulse)
18	FW	BRA	Carlão (Transferred from União de Leiria)
20	MF	JPN	Gaku Shibasaki (Drafted from Aomori Yamada High School)
22	DF	JPN	Daigo Nishi (Transferred from Consadole Sapporo)
23	DF	JPN	Gen Shoji (Drafted from Yonago Kita High School)
27	MF	JPN	Takahide Umebachi (Drafted from Kansai University Daiichi Senior High School)
28	MF	JPN	Shouma Doi (Promoted from youth team)
29	GK	JPN	Akihiro Sato (Transferred from Sanfrecce Hiroshima)
30	FW	JPN	Yuzo Tashiro (Loan return from Montedio Yamagata)

Out Note: Flags indicate national team as defined under FIFA eligibility rules; some limited exceptions apply. Players may hold more than one non-FIFA nationality.

No.	Pos.	Nation	Player
4	DF	JPN	Go Oiwa (Retired)
5	DF	BRA	Gilton Ribeiro (Loan return to Porto Alegre Futebol Clube)
16	MF	JPN	Yuji Funayama (Transferred to Montedio Yamagata)
17	FW	JPN	Ryuta Sasaki (Loan to Shonan Bellmare)
18	FW	BRA	Marquinhos (Transferred to Vegalta Sendai)
20	MF	JPN	Shuto Suzuki (Loan to Tochigi S.C.)
27	DF	JPN	Kenta Kasai (Released)
28	GK	JPN	Shinichiro Kawamata (Loan to Vegalta Sendai)
30	MF	JPN	Hiroyuki Omichi (Transferred to Fagiano Okayama)
32	DF	JPN	Tomohiko Miyazaki (Loan to Yokohama F.C.)
33	MF	JPN	Daichi Kawashima (Loan to Montedio Yamagata)

== Competitions ==
=== Super Cup ===
26 February 2011	Nagoya Grampus	1–1 (3–1 p)	Kashima Antlers	Nissan Stadium
Saturday 13:37	Masukawa 54'	Report	66' Nozawa	Attendance: 35,963; Referee: Nishimura
	Penalties
	Kennedy (penalty missed); Fujimoto (penalty scored); Santos (penalty scored); Ogawa (penalty scored)		(penalty missed) Iwamasa; (penalty scored) Motoyama; (penalty missed) Alex; (penalty missed) Araiba

=== J.League ===
==== League table ====
Pos	Team	Pld	W	D	L	GF	GA	GD	Pts
4	Vegalta Sendai	34	14	14	6	39	25	+14	56
5	Yokohama F. Marinos	34	16	8	10	46	40	+6	56
6	Kashima Antlers	34	13	11	10	53	40	+13	50
7	Sanfrecce Hiroshima	34	14	8	12	52	49	+3	50
8	Júbilo Iwata	34	13	8	13	53	45	+8	47

Updated to match(es) played on December 3, 2011. Source: J.League Division 1
Rules for classification: 1st points; 2nd goal differential; 3rd goals scored; 4th head-to-head results; 5th disciplinary points; 6th draw. If two clubs are tied for first place, both clubs will be declared.

==== Matches ====
6 March 2011 Round 1	Kashima Antlers	3–3	Omiya Ardija	Kashima Soccer Stadium
Sunday 15:00	Inoha 47', Iwamasa 58', Tsubouchi 90' (o.g.)	Report	11', 64' Lee, 49' Ueda	Attendance: 23,262; Referee: Yoshida

12 March 2011 Round 2	Shimizu S-Pulse	0–0	Kashima Antlers	Nihondaira Sports Stadium
Saturday 13:00		Report		Attendance: 15,528; Referee: Kenji Ogiya

20 March 2011 Round 3	Kashima Antlers	1–2	Albirex Niigata	Hitachi Kashiwa Soccer Stadium
Sunday 16:00	Nozawa 56' (pen.)	report	59' (pen.) Lopes, 88' Young-Cheol	Attendance: 10,602; Referee: Masaaki Toma

2 April 2011 Round 4	Nagoya Grampus	2–1	Kashima Antlers	Toyota Stadium
Saturday 13:00	35' Kennedy, 79' Burzanović	report	2' Osako	Attendance: 12,845; Referee: Toshmitsu Yoshida

10 April 2011 Round 5	Kashima Antlers	v	Vegalta Sendai
Sunday 16:00

16 April 2011 Round 6	Kashiwa Reysol	v	Kashima Antlers
Saturday 15:30

23 April 2011 Round 7	Kashima Antlers	v	Yokohama F. Marinos
Saturday 15:00

29 April 2011 Round 8	Avispa Fukuoka	v	Kashima Antlers
Friday 13:00

17 August 2011 Round 9	Kashima Antlers	v	Cerezo Osaka
Wednesday 19:00

27 July 2011 Round 10	Kashima Antlers	v	Gamba Osaka
Wednesday 19:00

15 May 2011 Round 11	Kawasaki Frontale	v	Kashima Antlers
Sunday 16:00

21 May 2011 Round 12	Kashima Antlers	v	Urawa Red Diamonds
Saturday 16:00

29 May 2011 Round 13	Sanfrecce Hiroshima	v	Kashima Antlers
Sunday 19:00

11 June 2011 Round 14	Montedio Yamagata	v	Kashima Antlers
Saturday 16:00

15 June 2011 Round 15	Kashima Antlers	v	Ventforet Kofu
Wednesday 19:00

18 June 2011 Round 16	Kashima Antlers	v	Júbilo Iwata
Saturday 19:00

22 June 2011 Round 17	Vissel Kobe	v	Kashima Antlers
Wednesday 19:00

25 June 2011 Round 18	Kashima Antlers	v	Kawasaki Frontale
Saturday 18:30

31 July 2011 Round 19	Cerezo Osaka	v	Kashima Antlers
Sunday 18:00

6 August 2011 Round 20	Kashima Antlers	v	Montedio Yamagata
Saturday 18:30

13 August 2011 Round 21	Vegalta Sendai	v	Kashima Antlers
Saturday 19:00

20 August 2011 Round 22	Kashima Antlers	v	Sanfrecce Hiroshima
Saturday 18:30

24 August 2011 Round 23	Ventforet Kofu	v	Kashima Antlers
Wednesday 19:00

28 August 2011 Round 24	Kashima Antlers	v	Avispa Fukuoka
Sunday 18:30

10 September 2011 Round 25	Albirex Niigata	v	Kashima Antlers
Saturday

18 September 2011 Round 26	Kashima Antlers	v	Nagoya Grampus
Sunday

24 September 2011 Round 27	Urawa Red Diamonds	v	Kashima Antlers
Saturday

2 October 2011 Round 28	Kashima Antlers	v	Kashiwa Reysol
Sunday

15 October 2011 Round 29	Júbilo Iwata	v	Kashima Antlers
Saturday

22 October 2011 Round 30	Kashima Antlers	v	Vissel Kobe
Saturday

29 October 2011 Round 31	Gamba Osaka	v	Kashima Antlers
Saturday

19 November 2011 Round 32	Omiya Ardija	v	Kashima Antlers
Saturday

26 November 2011 Round 33	Kashima Antlers	v	Shimizu S-Pulse
Saturday

3 December 2011 Round 34	Yokohama F. Marinos	v	Kashima Antlers
Saturday

=== J.League Cup ===
2011-10-29 Final	Urawa Reds	0–1 (a.e.t.)	Kashima Antlers	Tokyo National Stadium, Tokyo
13:10		report (Japanese)	Yuya Osako 105'	Attendance: 46,599; Referee: Minoru Tojo

=== Emperor's Cup ===
2011-10-12 Second round	Kashima Antlers	2–0	University of Tsukuba	Kashima Soccer Stadium, Kashima
19:00	Tashiro 33'; Osako 38'	Report		Attendance: 3,468; Referee: Minoru Tojo

2011-11-16 Third round	Kashima Antlers	2–1 (a.e.t.)	Kataller Toyama	Kashima Soccer Stadium, Kashima
19:00	Koroki 28'; Nozawa 101'	Report	Fukuda 42'	Attendance: 3,465; Referee: Toshimitsu Yoshida

2011-12-17 Fourth round	Kashima Antlers	0–1	Kyoto Sanga	Marugame Stadium, Marugame
17:00		report (Japanese)	Takumi Miyayoshi 59'	Attendance: 5,671; Referee: Itaru Hirose

=== Group stage ===
==== Standings ====
Group H
Team	Pld	W	D	L	GF	GA	GD	Pts
(South Korea) Suwon Bluewings	6	3	3	0	12	3	+9	12
(Japan) Kashima Antlers	6	3	3	0	9	3	+6	12
(Australia) Sydney FC	6	1	2	3	6	11	−5	5
(China) Shanghai Shenhua	6	0	2	4	3	13	−10	2

==== Matches ====
2 March 2011 Group Stage	Shanghai Shenhua (China)	0–0	(Japan) Kashima Antlers	Hongkou Stadium, Shanghai
20:00 UTC+08:00		Report		Attendance: 20,036; Referee: Khalil Al Ghamdi (Saudi Arabia)

6 April 2011 Group Stage	Suwon Samsung Bluewings (South Korea)	1–1	(Japan) Kashima Antlers	Suwon World Cup Stadium, Suwon
19:30 UTC+09:00	Yeom Ki-Hoon 67'	Report	K. Nakata 71'	Attendance: 7,689; Referee: Abdullah Al Hilali (Oman)

13 April 2011^{1} Group Stage	Sydney FC (Australia)	0–3	(Japan) Kashima Antlers	Sydney Football Stadium, Sydney
20:00 UTC+10:00		Report	Nozawa 41'; Gabriel 51'; Koroki 90+2'	Attendance: 7,320; Referee: Ali Al Badwawi (UAE)

19 April 2011 Group Stage	Kashima Antlers (Japan)	1–1	(South Korea) Suwon Samsung Bluewings	National Olympic Stadium, Tokyo^{2}
14:00 UTC+09:00	Tashiro 55'	Report	Yeom Ki-Hun 48'	Attendance: 4,619; Referee: Abdulrahman Abdou (Qatar)

3 May 2011 Group Stage	Kashima Antlers (Japan)	2–0	(China) Shanghai Shenhua	National Olympic Stadium, Tokyo^{2}
15:00 UTC+09:00	Koroki 32', 80'	Report		Attendance: 11,954; Referee: Andre El Haddad (Lebanon)

10 May 2011^{1} Group Stage	Kashima Antlers (Japan)	2–1	(Australia) Sydney FC	National Olympic Stadium, Tokyo^{2}
15:00 UTC+09:00	Osako 64'; Nozawa 84'	Report	Jurman 26'	Attendance: 3,164; Referee: Khalil Al Ghamdi (Saudi Arabia)

- Note 1: The Kashima Antlers v Sydney FC match was postponed from 16 March 2011 to 10 May 2011 due to the 2011 Tōhoku earthquake and tsunami in Japan. The return match, Sydney FC v Kashima Antlers, was brought forward from 10 May 2011 to 13 April 2011. All home matches of the Kashima Antlers were moved to the National Olympic Stadium in Tokyo as the Kashima Soccer Stadium in Kashima was damaged in the earthquake.

=== Knock-out stage ===
25 May 2011 Round of 16	FC Seoul (South Korea)	3–0	(Japan) Kashima Antlers	Seoul World Cup Stadium, Seoul
19:30 UTC+09:00	Bang Seung-Hwan 38'; Damjanović 55'; Ko Myong-Jin 90+2'	Report		Attendance: 12,725; Referee: Nawaf Shukralla (Bahrain)
