= 2008 Kashima Antlers season =

Kashima Antlers
2008 season
- Manager: Oliveira
- Stadium: Kashima Soccer Stadium
- J. League 1: Champions
- Emperor's Cup: 5th Round
- J. League Cup: Quarterfinals
- AFC Champions League: Quarterfinals
- Top goalscorer: Marquinhos (21)
Home colours	Away colours	Third colours

2008 Kashima Antlers season

== Competitions ==
Competitions	Position
J. League 1	Champions / 18 clubs
Emperor's Cup	5th Round
J. League Cup	Quarterfinals

=== J. League 1 ===
==== League table ====
Pos	Team	Pld	W	D	L	GF	GA	GD	Pts	Qualification or relegation
1	Kashima Antlers (C)	34	18	9	7	56	30	+26	63	Qualification for 2009 AFC Champions League Group stage
2	Kawasaki Frontale	34	18	6	10	65	42	+23	60	Qualification for 2009 AFC Champions League Group stage
3	Nagoya Grampus	34	17	8	9	48	35	+13	59	Qualification for 2009 AFC Champions League Group stage
4	Oita Trinita	34	16	8	10	33	24	+9	56	Qualification for Pan-Pacific Championship 2009 (Note: Qualified as the winner of 2008 J.League Cup.)
5	Shimizu S-Pulse	34	16	7	11	50	42	+8	55	

Updated to match(es) played on December 6, 2008. Source: J. League Division 1
Rules for classification: 1) points; 2) goal difference; 3) number of goals scored.
(C) Champions

==== Results ====
J.League Division 1 results
Date	Opponent	Venue	Result F–A	Attendance
8 March 2008	Consadole Sapporo	H	4–0	28,152
16 March 2008	Tokyo Verdy	A	2–0	18,934
30 March 2008	Yokohama F. Marinos	H	2–1	22,901
2 April 2008	Albirex Niigata	A	2–0	22,740
5 April 2008	JEF United Chiba	H	4–1	17,257
13 April 2008	Urawa Red Diamonds	A	0–2	54,450
19 April 2008	Gamba Osaka	H	0–0	17,292
27 April 2008	Omiya Ardija	A	1–1	11,884
30 April 2008	Vissel Kobe	H	2–2	10,221
3 May 2008	Kawasaki Frontale	A	2–3	20,280
11 May 2008	Shimizu S-Pulse	A	0–1	16,195
17 May 2008	Kashiwa Reysol	H	1–1	20,361
25 June 2008	Oita Trinita	H	1–0	8,286
28 June 2008	Nagoya Grampus	A	4–0	18,215
5 July 2008	Júbilo Iwata	A	2–1	18,479
13 July 2008	FC Tokyo	H	4–1	16,561
16 July 2008	Kyoto Sanga FC	A	1–2	15,081
20 July 2008	Yokohama F. Marinos	A	2–0	34,752
27 July 2008	Urawa Red Diamonds	H	1–1	36,412
9 August 2008	JEF United Chiba	A	1–3	16,190
16 August 2008	Tokyo Verdy	H	4–1	21,431
23 August 2008	Nagoya Grampus	H	1–2	19,868
27 August 2008	Vissel Kobe	A	2–1	13,123
13 September 2008	Kawasaki Frontale	H	1–1	22,292
20 September 2008	Kashiwa Reysol	A	1–1	10,669
28 September 2008	Shimizu S-Pulse	H	2–0	15,481
1 October 2008	Omiya Ardija	H	2–0	6,725
4 October 2008	Gamba Osaka	A	0–0	19,386
18 October 2008	Kyoto Sanga FC	H	2–1	20,580
26 October 2008	FC Tokyo	A	2–3	33,596
9 November 2008	Albirex Niigata	H	0–0	21,500
23 November 2008	Oita Trinita	A	1–0	31,744
29 November 2008	Júbilo Iwata	H	1–0	29,820
6 December 2008	Consadole Sapporo	A	1–0	26,220

=== Super Cup ===
Kashima Antlers qualified for this tournament as winners of the 2007 J.League Division 1.

1 March 2008 Final	Kashima Antlers	2–2 (3–4 p)	Sanfrecce Hiroshima	Tokyo
13:35	Iwamasa (yellow card) 7' (yellow-red card) 12'; Aoki (yellow card) 42'; Motoyama 49'; Nozawa 52'; Ōiwa (yellow card) 79'	Report	Ri Han-jae (yellow card) 33' (yellow-red card) 38'; Hattori (yellow card) 60'; Kubo 80'; Jukić (yellow card) 84'; Satō 85' (yellow card) 89'	Stadium: National Stadium; Attendance: 27,245; Referee: Masaaki Iemoto
	Penalties
	Marquinhos (penalty scored); Chugo (penalty scored); Danilo (penalty missed); Motoyama (penalty missed); Ogasawara (penalty scored)		(penalty scored) Morisaki; (penalty scored) Stoyanov; (penalty scored) Makino; (penalty missed) Jukić; (penalty scored) Satō

=== Emperor's Cup ===
Kashima Antlers received a bye to the fourth round as being part of the J.League Division 1.

2 November 2008 4th Round	Kashima Antlers	2–2 (a.e.t.) (3–0 p)	Kokushikan University	Kashima
13:04	Danilo 43'; Marquinhos 74' (pen.) (yellow card) 85'	Report	Kojima (yellow card) 23'; Sato (yellow card) 25'; Hamaya (yellow card) 27'; Takahashi 39'; Amano 59'; Yamada (yellow card) 73'	Stadium: Kashima Soccer Stadium; Attendance: 5,286; Referee: Yuki Noda
	Penalties
	Marquinhos (penalty scored); Nozawa (penalty scored); Danilo (penalty scored)		(penalty missed) Takeoka; (penalty missed) Kashiwa; (penalty missed) Yoshino

15 November 2008 5th Round	Kashima Antlers	3–4 (a.e.t.)	Shimizu S-Pulse	Kashima
13:00	Masuda 28'; Marquinhos 50' (pen.); Chugo (yellow card) 56'; Marcinho 114'	Report	Hyodo 17'; Aoyama (yellow card) 23'; Nshibe (yellow card) 49'; Ichikawa (yellow card) 73'; Yamamoto 80' (yellow card) 92'; Edamura 104'; Hara 119'	Stadium: Kashima Soccer Stadium; Attendance: 5,158; Referee: Hajime Matsuo

=== J. League Cup ===
Kashima Antlers received a bye to the quarter-finals in order to avoid scheduling conflicts due to their participation in the AFC Champions League.

Quarter-finals

2 July 2008 1st Leg	Kashima Antlers	0–0	Shimizu S-Pulse	Kashima
19:00	Araiba (yellow card) 57'; Aoki (yellow card) 71'	Report	Hara (yellow card) 16'; Honda (yellow card) 57'; Hyodo (yellow card) 78'	Stadium: Kashima Soccer Stadium; Attendance: 6,757; Referee: Hajime Matsuo

6 August 2008 2nd Leg	Shimizu S-Pulse	2–1 (2–1 agg.)	Kashima Antlers	Shimizu-ku
19:00	Iwashita 16'; Aoyama (yellow card) 37'; Hyodo 48' (yellow card) 63'	Report	Chugo (yellow card) 26'; Marquinhos 57'; Aoki (yellow card) 62'; Nakata (yellow card) 85'	Stadium: Nihondaira Sports Stadium; Attendance: 8,949; Referee: Kazuhiko Matsumura

=== AFC Champions League ===
Kashima Antlers qualified for this tournament after being crowned champions of the 2007 J.League Division 1.

==== Group stage ====
Pos	Team	Pld	W	D	L	GF	GA	GD	Pts	Qualification
1	(Japan) Kashima Antlers	6	5	0	1	28	3	+25	15	Advance to knockout stage
2	(China) Beijing Guoan	6	4	0	2	14	9	+5	12	
3	(Thailand) Krung Thai Bank	6	2	1	3	20	27	−7	7	
4	(Vietnam) Nam Định	6	0	1	5	4	27	−23	1	

==== Knockout stage ====
Quarterfinals

17 September 2008 1st Leg	Kashima Antlers (Japan)	1–1	(Australia) Adelaide United	Kashima, Japan
19:00 UTC+9	Ogasawara (yellow card) 22'; Aoki (yellow card) 44'; Cornthwaite 45+2' (o.g.); Masuda (yellow card) 51'	Report	Dodd 37'; Cornthwaite (yellow card) 51'; Ognenovski (yellow card) 51'; Costanzo (yellow card) 60'; Galekovic (yellow card) 90+3'	Stadium: Kashima Soccer Stadium; Attendance: 7,004; Referee: Lee Gi-young (South Korea)

24 September 2008 2nd Leg	Adelaide United (Australia)	1–0 (2–1 agg.)	(Japan) Kashima Antlers	Adelaide, Australia
19:30 UTC+10:30	Ognenovski (yellow card) 55'; Cristiano (yellow card) 64'; Spagnuolo (yellow card) 68'; Cornthwaite 73'	Report	Chugo (yellow card) 29'; Sogahata (yellow card) 90+4'	Stadium: Hindmarsh Stadium; Attendance: 16,965; Referee: Saad Kamil Al-Fadhli (Kuwait)

== Player statistics ==
No.	Pos.	Player	D.o.B. (Age)	Height / Weight	J. League 1		Emperor's Cup		J. League Cup		Total	
No.	Pos.	Player	D.o.B. (Age)	Height / Weight	Apps	Goals	Apps	Goals	Apps	Goals	Apps	Goals
1	GK	Hideaki Ozawa	17 March 1974 (aged 33)	cm / kg	0	0						
2	DF	Atsuto Uchida	27 March 1988 (aged 19)	cm / kg	25	1						
3	DF	Daiki Iwamasa	30 January 1982 (aged 26)	cm / kg	33	2						
4	DF	Go Oiwa	23 June 1972 (aged 35)	cm / kg	18	0						
6	MF	Kōji Nakata	9 July 1979 (aged 28)	cm / kg	9	0						
7	DF	Toru Araiba	12 July 1979 (aged 28)	cm / kg	30	2						
8	MF	Takuya Nozawa	12 August 1981 (aged 26)	cm / kg	27	3						
9	FW	Yūzō Tashiro	22 July 1982 (aged 25)	cm / kg	27	3						
10	MF	Masashi Motoyama	20 June 1979 (aged 28)	cm / kg	32	3						
11	MF	Danilo	11 June 1979 (aged 28)	cm / kg	28	4						
13	FW	Shinzo Koroki	31 July 1986 (aged 21)	cm / kg	29	8						
14	MF	Chikashi Masuda	19 June 1985 (aged 22)	cm / kg	19	0						
15	MF	Takeshi Aoki	28 September 1982 (aged 25)	cm / kg	34	2						
16	MF	Masaki Chugo	16 May 1982 (aged 25)	cm / kg	24	0						
17	FW	Ryuta Sasaki	7 February 1988 (aged 20)	cm / kg	11	2						
18	FW	Marquinhos	23 March 1976 (aged 31)	cm / kg	30	21						
19	DF	Masahiko Inoha	28 August 1985 (aged 22)	cm / kg	23	0						
20	MF	Shuto Suzuki	31 August 1985 (aged 22)	cm / kg	0	0						
21	GK	Hitoshi Sogahata	2 August 1979 (aged 28)	cm / kg	34	0						
22	DF	Naoya Ishigami	2 March 1985 (aged 23)	cm / kg	4	0						
23	MF	Yuji Funayama	19 January 1985 (aged 23)	cm / kg	2	0						
24	DF	Takefumi Toma	21 March 1989 (aged 18)	cm / kg	0	0						
25	MF	Yasushi Endo	7 April 1988 (aged 19)	cm / kg	0	0						
26	MF	Kenji Koyano	22 June 1988 (aged 19)	cm / kg	0	0						
27	DF	Kenta Kasai	25 December 1985 (aged 22)	cm / kg	0	0						
28	GK	Shinichiro Kawamata	23 July 1989 (aged 18)	cm / kg	0	0						
29	GK	Tetsu Sugiyama	26 June 1981 (aged 26)	cm / kg	0	0						
30	MF	Hiroyuki Omichi	25 June 1987 (aged 20)	cm / kg	0	0						
31	DF	Keita Goto	8 September 1986 (aged 21)	cm / kg	0	0						
32	DF	Seiji Kaneko	27 May 1980 (aged 27)	cm / kg	0	0						
33	MF	Marcinho	20 March 1981 (aged 26)	cm / kg	12	0						
40	MF	Mitsuo Ogasawara	5 April 1979 (aged 28)	cm / kg	24	5						

== Other pages ==
- (in Japanese) J. League official site
