= 2009 Kashima Antlers season =

Kashima Antlers
2009 season
- Manager: Oliveira
- Stadium: Kashima Soccer Stadium
- J. League 1: Champions
- Emperor's Cup: Quarterfinals
- J. League Cup: Quarterfinals
- Top goalscorer: Marquinhos (13)
Home colours	Away colours	Third colours

2009 Kashima Antlers season

== Competitions ==
Competitions	Position
J. League 1	Champions / 18 clubs
Emperor's Cup	Quarterfinals
J. League Cup	Quarterfinals

=== J. League 1 ===
Pos	Team	Pld	W	D	L	GF	GA	GD	Pts	Qualification or relegation
1	Kashima Antlers (C)	34	20	6	8	51	30	+21	66	Qualification for 2010 AFC Champions League group stage (Note: Sanfrecce Hiroshima received fourth Japanese berth in the group stage of the 2010 AFC Champions League because Gamba Osaka, the winners of the 2009 Emperor's Cup, had been already qualified for ACL through J.League championship.)
2	Kawasaki Frontale	34	19	7	8	64	40	+24	64	Qualification for 2010 AFC Champions League group stage
3	Gamba Osaka	34	18	6	10	62	44	+18	60	Qualification for 2010 AFC Champions League group stage
4	Sanfrecce Hiroshima	34	15	11	8	53	44	+9	56	Qualification for 2010 AFC Champions League group stage
5	FC Tokyo	34	16	5	13	47	39	+8	53	

Updated to match(es) played on December 5, 2009. Source: J.League Division 1
Rules for classification: 1) points; 2) goal difference; 3) number of goals scored.
(C) Champions

== Player statistics ==
No.	Pos.	Player	D.o.B. (Age)	Height / Weight	J. League 1		Emperor's Cup		J. League Cup		Total	
No.	Pos.	Player	D.o.B. (Age)	Height / Weight	Apps	Goals	Apps	Goals	Apps	Goals	Apps	Goals
1	GK	Hideaki Ozawa	March 17, 1974 (aged 34)	cm / kg	0	0						
2	DF	Atsuto Uchida	March 27, 1988 (aged 20)	cm / kg	31	0						
3	DF	Daiki Iwamasa	January 30, 1982 (aged 27)	cm / kg	33	4						
4	DF	Go Oiwa	June 23, 1972 (aged 36)	cm / kg	6	0						
6	MF	Kōji Nakata	July 9, 1979 (aged 29)	cm / kg	22	1						
7	DF	Toru Araiba	July 12, 1979 (aged 29)	cm / kg	29	0						
8	MF	Takuya Nozawa	August 12, 1981 (aged 27)	cm / kg	33	7						
9	FW	Yūzō Tashiro	July 22, 1982 (aged 26)	cm / kg	16	2						
10	MF	Masashi Motoyama	June 20, 1979 (aged 29)	cm / kg	27	2						
11	MF	Danilo	June 11, 1979 (aged 29)	cm / kg	23	2						
13	FW	Shinzo Koroki	July 31, 1986 (aged 22)	cm / kg	32	12						
14	MF	Chikashi Masuda	June 19, 1985 (aged 23)	cm / kg	17	0						
15	MF	Takeshi Aoki	September 28, 1982 (aged 26)	cm / kg	33	0						
17	FW	Ryuta Sasaki	February 7, 1988 (aged 21)	cm / kg	4	1						
18	FW	Marquinhos	March 23, 1976 (aged 32)	cm / kg	31	13						
19	DF	Masahiko Inoha	August 28, 1985 (aged 23)	cm / kg	30	1						
20	MF	Shuto Suzuki	August 31, 1985 (aged 23)	cm / kg	0	0						
21	GK	Hitoshi Sogahata	August 2, 1979 (aged 29)	cm / kg	34	0						
23	MF	Yuji Funayama	January 19, 1985 (aged 24)	cm / kg	0	0						
24	DF	Takefumi Toma	March 21, 1989 (aged 19)	cm / kg	0	0						
25	MF	Yasushi Endo	April 7, 1988 (aged 20)	cm / kg	2	0						
26	MF	Kenji Koyano	June 22, 1988 (aged 20)	cm / kg	0	0						
27	DF	Kenta Kasai	December 25, 1985 (aged 23)	cm / kg	0	0						
28	GK	Shinichiro Kawamata	July 23, 1989 (aged 19)	cm / kg	0	0						
29	GK	Tetsu Sugiyama	June 26, 1981 (aged 27)	cm / kg	0	0						
30	MF	Hiroyuki Omichi	June 25, 1987 (aged 21)	cm / kg	0	0						
31	DF	Keita Goto	September 8, 1986 (aged 22)	cm / kg	0	0						
32	DF	Tomohiko Miyazaki	November 21, 1986 (aged 22)	cm / kg	0	0						
33	MF	Daichi Kawashima	November 21, 1986 (aged 22)	cm / kg	0	0						
34	FW	Yuya Osako	May 18, 1990 (aged 18)	cm / kg	22	3						
35	DF	Park Joo-Ho	January 16, 1987 (aged 22)	cm / kg	19	0						
40	MF	Mitsuo Ogasawara	April 5, 1979 (aged 29)	cm / kg	32	3						

== Other pages ==
- (in Japanese) J. League official site
