= 2010 Kashima Antlers season =

Kashima Antlers
2010 season
- Manager: Oliveira
- Stadium: Kashima Soccer Stadium
- J. League 1: 4th
- Emperor's Cup: Champions
- J. League Cup: Quarterfinals
- Top goalscorer: Marquinhos (11)
Home colours	Away colours

2010 Kashima Antlers season

== Competitions ==
Competitions	Position
J. League 1	4th / 18 clubs
Emperor's Cup	Champions
J. League Cup	Quarterfinals

=== J. League 1 ===
Pos	Team	Pld	W	D	L	GF	GA	GD	Pts	Qualification or relegation
2	Gamba Osaka	34	18	8	8	65	44	+21	62	Qualification for 2011 AFC Champions League group stage (Note: Kashima Antlers qualified as 2010 Emperor's Cup winners.)
3	Cerezo Osaka	34	17	10	7	58	32	+26	61	Qualification for 2011 AFC Champions League group stage
4	Kashima Antlers	34	16	12	6	51	31	+20	60	Qualification for 2011 AFC Champions League group stage
5	Kawasaki Frontale	34	15	9	10	61	47	+14	54	
6	Shimizu S-Pulse	34	15	9	10	60	49	+11	54	

Updated to match(es) played on December 4, 2010. Source: J.League Division 1
Rules for classification: 1) points; 2) goal difference; 3) number of goals scored.

== Player statistics ==
No.	Pos.	Player	D.o.B. (Age)	Height / Weight	J. League 1		Emperor's Cup		J. League Cup		Total	
No.	Pos.	Player	D.o.B. (Age)	Height / Weight	Apps	Goals	Apps	Goals	Apps	Goals	Apps	Goals
1	GK	Tetsu Sugiyama	June 26, 1981 (aged 28)	cm / kg	0	0						
2	DF	Atsuto Uchida	March 27, 1988 (aged 21)	cm / kg	9	0						
3	DF	Daiki Iwamasa	January 30, 1982 (aged 28)	cm / kg	34	3						
4	DF	Go Oiwa	June 23, 1972 (aged 37)	cm / kg	6	0						
5	DF	Gilton Ribeiro	March 25, 1989 (aged 20)	cm / kg	25	1						
6	MF	Kōji Nakata	July 9, 1979 (aged 30)	cm / kg	32	3						
7	DF	Toru Araiba	July 12, 1979 (aged 30)	cm / kg	33	1						
8	MF	Takuya Nozawa	August 12, 1981 (aged 28)	cm / kg	34	8						
9	FW	Yuya Osako	May 18, 1990 (aged 19)	cm / kg	27	4						
10	MF	Masashi Motoyama	June 20, 1979 (aged 30)	cm / kg	15	2						
11	MF	Fellype Gabriel	December 6, 1985 (aged 24)	cm / kg	31	2						
13	FW	Shinzo Koroki	July 31, 1986 (aged 23)	cm / kg	30	8						
14	DF	Lee Jung-Soo	January 8, 1980 (aged 30)	cm / kg	10	3						
15	MF	Takeshi Aoki	September 28, 1982 (aged 27)	cm / kg	23	0						
16	MF	Yuji Funayama	January 19, 1985 (aged 25)	cm / kg	0	0						
17	FW	Ryuta Sasaki	February 7, 1988 (aged 22)	cm / kg	17	0						
18	FW	Marquinhos	March 23, 1976 (aged 33)	cm / kg	27	11						
19	DF	Masahiko Inoha	August 28, 1985 (aged 24)	cm / kg	26	0						
20	MF	Shuto Suzuki	August 31, 1985 (aged 24)	cm / kg	0	0						
21	GK	Hitoshi Sogahata	August 2, 1979 (aged 30)	cm / kg	34	0						
24	DF	Takefumi Toma	March 21, 1989 (aged 20)	cm / kg	1	0						
25	MF	Yasushi Endo	April 7, 1988 (aged 21)	cm / kg	19	2						
26	MF	Kenji Koyano	June 22, 1988 (aged 21)	cm / kg	1	0						
27	DF	Kenta Kasai	December 25, 1985 (aged 24)	cm / kg	0	0						
28	GK	Shinichiro Kawamata	July 23, 1989 (aged 20)	cm / kg	0	0						
29	GK	Akihiro Sato	August 30, 1986 (aged 23)	cm / kg	0	0						
30	MF	Hiroyuki Omichi	June 25, 1987 (aged 22)	cm / kg	0	0						
31	GK	Naoki Yagi	December 18, 1991 (aged 18)	cm / kg	0	0						
32	DF	Tomohiko Miyazaki	November 21, 1986 (aged 23)	cm / kg	4	0						
33	MF	Daichi Kawashima	November 21, 1986 (aged 23)	cm / kg	0	0						
40	MF	Mitsuo Ogasawara	April 5, 1979 (aged 30)	cm / kg	33	3						

== Other pages ==
- (in Japanese) J. League official site
