= 2012 Kashima Antlers season =

Kashima Antlers
2012 season
- Chairman: Hiroshi Ushijima
- Manager: Jorginho
- J.League Division 1: 11th
- Emperor's Cup: Semifinals
- J.League Cup: Champions
Home colours	Away colours	Third colours

The 2012 Kashima Antlers season was Kashima Antlers's 20th season in J.League Division 1 and 24th overall in the Japanese top flight. Kashima Antlers also competed in the 2012 Emperor's Cup and 2012 J.League Cup.

== Competitions ==
=== J.League ===
==== League table ====
Pos	Team	Pld	W	D	L	GF	GA	GD	Pts
9	Shimizu S-Pulse	34	14	7	13	39	40	−1	49
10	FC Tokyo	34	14	6	14	47	44	+3	48
11	Kashima Antlers	34	12	10	12	50	43	+7	46
12	Júbilo Iwata	34	13	7	14	57	53	+4	46
13	Omiya Ardija	34	11	11	12	38	45	−7	44

Updated to match(es) played on 1 December 2012. Source: J.League Division 1
Rules for classification: 1) points; 2) goal difference; 3) number of goals scored.

==== Matches ====
10 March 2012 1	Vegalta Sendai	1–0	Kashima Antlers	Yurtec Stadium Sendai
Saturday 14:04	Uemoto 62'	Report		Attendance: 18,250; Referee: Kimura

17 March 2012 2	Kashima Antlers	0–1	Kawasaki Frontale	Kashima Soccer Stadium
Saturday 14:04		Report	45+2' Renato	Attendance: 19,010; Referee: Nishimura

24 March 2012 3	Sanfrecce Hiroshima	2–0	Kashima Antlers	Hiroshima Big Arch
Saturday 13:04	Sato 25'; Osaki 71'	Report		Attendance: 14,349; Referee: Inoue

31 March 2012 4	Yokohama F. Marinos	0–0	Kashima Antlers	Nissan Stadium
Saturday 19:03		Report		Attendance: 22,126; Referee: Iida

7 April 2012 5	Kashima Antlers	1–3	Urawa Red Diamonds	Kashima Soccer Stadium
Saturday 18:00	Koroki 2'; Araiba (yellow card) 24'; Umebachi (yellow card) 27'; Endo (yellow card) 67'	Summary	Marcio Richardes 3', 26' (pen.); Popó 5'; Kashiwagi (yellow card) 67'; Makino (yellow card) 84'	Attendance: 23,507; Referee: (Japan) Hiroyuki Kimura

14 April 2012 6	F.C. Tokyo	1–2	Kashima Antlers	Ajinomoto Stadium
Saturday 14:00	Yazawa (yellow card) 45+8'; Shiota (yellow card) 58'; Tanabe 85'	Summary	Umebachi (yellow card) 40'; Koroki (yellow card) 45' (goal) 66'; Osako (yellow card) 78'; Iwamasa (yellow card) 81'; Ogasawara (yellow card) 83'; Juninho (yellow card) 84'; Endo 90+4'; Masuda (yellow card) 90+7'	Attendance: 19,279; Referee: (Japan) Toshimitsu Yoshida

21 April 2012 7	Kashima Antlers	3–2	Cerezo Osaka	Kashima Soccer Stadium
Saturday 16:00	Dutra 57' (yellow card) 88'; Koroki 62'; Endo 85'	Summary	Kim Bo-Kyung 20', 44' (yellow card) 72'; Yamaguchi (yellow card) 36'; Ohgihara (yellow card) 41'; Moniwa (yellow card) 82'; Kurogi (yellow card) 89'	Attendance: 12,110; Referee: (Japan) Hajime Matsuo

28 April 2012 8	Kashima Antlers	5–0	Gamba Osaka	Kashima Soccer Stadium
Saturday 16:30	Endo 42'; Koroki 54'; Osako 72', 90+3'; Aoki (yellow card) 87'; Motoyama 90'	Summary	Endō (yellow card) 50'; Kurata (yellow card) 70'; Paulinho (yellow card) 85'; Lee Seung-Yeoul (yellow card) 88'	Attendance: 17,583; Referee: (Japan) Ryuji Sato

3 May 2012 9	Shimizu S-Pulse	3–0	Kashima Antlers	Outsourcing Stadium Nihondaira
Thursday 20:00	Ito 5'; Takagi 72'; Omae 75'	Summary	Koroki (yellow card) 45+1'; Iwamasa (yellow card) 50'	Attendance: 18,393; Referee: (Japan) Yoshiro Imamura

6 May 2012 10	Kashima Antlers	0–0	Sagan Tosu	Kashima Soccer Stadium
Sunday 20:00	Nishi (yellow card) 45+2'; Shibasaki (yellow card) 90+4'	Summary	Toyoda (yellow card) 28'	Attendance: 10,626; Referee: (Japan) Minoru Tojo

12 May 2012 11	Júbilo Iwata	3–0	Kashima Antlers	Yamaha Stadium
Saturday 15:00	Maeda 10'; Kobayashi (yellow card) 60'; Yamamoto (yellow card) 60'; Fujita (yellow card) 66'; Matsuura 85'; Yamada 90'	Summary	Ogasawara (yellow card) 32'	Attendance: 13,555; Referee: (Japan) Nobutsugu Murakami

19 May 2012 12	Kashima Antlers	7–0	Consadole Sapporo	Kashima Soccer Stadium
Saturday 15:00	Iwamasa 9'; Osako 15' (pen.); Yamamura 40'; Koroki 61'; Motoyama 74'; Juninho 82'; Endo 89'	Summary	North (yellow card) 15'; Kushibiki (yellow card) 45+1'	Attendance: 13,915; Referee: (Japan) Hiroyoshi Takayama

26 May 2012 13	Vissel Kobe	1–2	Kashima Antlers	Home's Stadium Kobe
Saturday 18:00	Inoha (yellow card) 49'; Tashiro 90'	Summary	Juninho 8'; Koroki 51'; Sogahata (yellow card) 85'	Attendance: 22,766; Referee: (Japan) Tomohiro Inoue

16 June 2012 14	Kashima Antlers	2–3	Nagoya Grampus	Kashima Soccer Stadium
Saturday 19:30	Koroki 44'; Motoyama 77'; Osako (yellow card) 89'; Araiba (yellow card) 90'	Summary	Daniel (yellow card) 40'; Nagai 59', 86'; Kanazaki 66'	Attendance: 15,010; Referee: (Japan) Nobutsugu Murakami

23 June 2012 15	Kashiwa Reysol	1–1	Kashima Antlers	Hitachi Kashiwa Soccer Stadium
Saturday 19:30	Jorge Wagner (yellow card) 16'; Leandro Domingues (yellow card) 60'; Kondo 90+4' (pen.)	Summary	Iwamasa (yellow card) 12'; Ogasawara 50'; Shibasaki (yellow card) 61'; Dutra (yellow card) 89'; Nishi (yellow card) 90+3'	Attendance: 13,987; Referee: (Paraguay) Antonio Arias

30 June 2012 16	Albirex Niigata	1–1	Kashima Antlers	Tohoku Electric Power Big Swan Stadium
Saturday 20:00	Michael 37'; Suzuki (yellow card) 73'; Mikado (yellow card) 90+1'	Summary	Dutra 17'; Iwamasa (yellow card) 68'; Aoki (yellow card) 76'; Ogasawara (yellow card) 88'	Attendance: 35,506; Referee: (Japan) Yoshiro Imamura

7 July 2012 17	Kashima Antlers	1–0	Omiya Ardija	Kashima Soccer Stadium
Saturday 19:30	Nishi 74'; Dutra (yellow card) 80'	Summary	Higashi (yellow card) 63'	Attendance: 12,787; Referee: (Japan) Yuichi Nishimura

14 July 2012 18	Cerezo Osaka	0–1	Kashima Antlers	Kincho Stadium
Saturday 20:00	Kempes (yellow card) 42'; Fujimoto (yellow card) 56'; Yamaguchi (yellow card) 86'; Ohgihara (yellow card) 90+1'	Summary	Ogasawara 38'; Koroki (yellow card) 45'	Attendance: 26,534; Referee: (Japan) Ryuji Sato

28 July 2012 19	Kashima Antlers	2–2	Sanfrecce Hiroshima	Kashima Soccer Stadium
Saturday 19:30	Osako 45+2', 75'; Aoki (yellow card) 65'	Summary	Satō 39'; Moriwaki 48' (yellow card) 90+4'	Attendance: 15,496; Referee: (Japan) Jumpei Iida

4 August 2012 20	Sagan Tosu	2–0	Kashima Antlers	Tosu Stadium
Saturday 20:00	Mizunuma 23'; Toyoda 61'; Noda (yellow card) 80'; Okuda (yellow card) 81'	Summary	Nishi (yellow card) 84'; Endo (yellow card) 89'	Attendance: 12,844; Referee: (Japan) Kazuhiko Matsummura

11 August 2012 21	Kashima Antlers	2–1	Kashima Antlers	Kashima Soccer Stadium
Saturday 19:30	Renato Cajá 19'; Endo 75'	Summary	Maeda 3' (yellow card) 38'	Attendance: 14,649; Referee: (Japan) Tomohiro Inoue

18 August 2012 22	Urawa Red Diamonds	2–1	Kashima Antlers	Saitama Stadium 2002
Saturday 20:00	Ugajin 26' (yellow card) 83'; Haraguchi 39'; Nagata (yellow card) 45+1'; Suzuki (yellow card) 63'	Summary	Osako (yellow card) 20'; Junior Dutra (yellow card) 45'; Endo (yellow card) 47'; Iwamasa 55'; Shibasaki (yellow card) 89'; Juninho (yellow card) 90+1'; Nishi (yellow card) 90+3'	Attendance: 44,131; Referee: (Japan) Kenji Ogiya

25 August 2012 23	Kashima Antlers	0–1	Albirex Niigata	Kashima Soccer Stadium
Saturday 19:30	Shibasaki (yellow card) 24'	Summary	Michael 38'; Tsubouchi (yellow card) 46'	Attendance: 12,729; Referee: (Japan) Toshimitsu Yoshida

1 September 2012 24	Kashima Antlers	1–0	Vissel Kobe	Kashima Soccer Stadium
Saturday 20:00	Osako 23'; Nishi (yellow card) 61'; Araiba (yellow card) 89'	Summary	Mogi (yellow card) 33'; Park Kang-Jo (yellow card) 63'; Inoha (yellow card) 72'	Attendance: 13,798; Referee: (Japan) Ryuji Sato

15 September 2012 25	Kawasaki Frontale	2–2	Kashima Antlers	Todoroki Athletics Stadium
Saturday 20:00	Saneto (yellow card) 15' (goal) 19'; Tanaka (yellow card) 62'; Igawa (yellow card) 71'; Oshima 78'; Kusukami (yellow card) 85'	Summary	Koroki 6', 17'	Attendance: 18,088; Referee: (Japan) Jumpei Iida

22 September 2012 26	Kashima Antlers	1–2	Yokohama F. Marinos	Kashima Soccer Stadium
Saturday 15:00	Renato Cajá (yellow card) 45+3'; Juninho 90+4'	Summary	Andrew Kumagai 11' (yellow card) 72'; Marquinhos (red card) 45+3'; Nakamura 55' (yellow card) 83'	Attendance: 16,845; Referee: (Japan) Itaru Hirose

29 September 2012 27	Gamba Osaka	2–2	Kashima Antlers	Osaka Expo '70 Stadium
Saturday 17:00	Abe (yellow card) 7'; Leandro 25', 90+2'	Summary	Renato Cajá 10' (yellow card) 64'; Junior Dutra (yellow card) 15' (goal) 39'; Iwamasa (yellow card) 62'	Attendance: 14,163; Referee: (Japan) Yudai Yamamoto

6 October 2012 28	Kashima Antlers	5–1	F.C. Tokyo	Kashima Soccer Stadium
Saturday 16:00	Junior Dutra 18', 71', 87'; Shibasaki 38'; Endo 69'	Summary	Takahashi 83'	Attendance: 15,118; Referee: (Japan) Takuto Okabe

20 October 2012 29	Consadole Sapporo	0–0	Kashima Antlers	Sapporo Dome
Saturday 17:00	Haga (yellow card) 44'; Kushibiki (yellow card) 49' (yellow-red card) 81'	Summary

27 October 2012 30	Kashima Antlers	–	Shimizu S-Pulse	Kashima Soccer Stadium
Saturday 18:00

7 November 2012 31	Omiya Ardija	–	Kashima Antlers	NACK5 Stadium Omiya
Wednesday 19:00

17 November 2012 32	Kashima Antlers	–	Vegalta Sendai	Kashima Soccer Stadium
Saturday 14:00

24 November 2012 33	Nagoya Grampus	–	Kashima Antlers	Toyota Stadium
Saturday 14:30

1 December 2012 34	Kashima Antlers	–	Kashiwa Reysol	Kashima Soccer Stadium
Saturday 15:30

=== J.League Cup ===
Team	Pld	W	D	L	GF	GA	GD	Pts
Shimizu S-Pulse	6	5	0	1	12	4	+8	15
Kashima Antlers	6	5	0	1	10	5	+5	15
Albirex Niigata	6	3	1	2	6	5	+1	10
Yokohama F. Marinos	6	1	2	3	7	9	−2	5
Omiya Ardija	6	1	2	3	7	10	−3	5
Consadole Sapporo	6	1	2	3	6	11	−5	5
Vissel Kobe	6	1	1	4	6	10	−8	4

20 March 2012 Group B	Kashima Antlers	2–0	Vissel Kobe	Kashima Soccer Stadium
Tuesday 15:00	Osako 20'; Endo 45+1'	Report		Attendance: 11,379; Referee: Matsuo

4 April 2012 Group B	Kashima Antlers	1–0	Omiya Ardija	Kashima Soccer Stadium
Wednesday 19:00	Koroki 31'	Report		Attendance: 6,515; Referee: Murakami

18 April 2012 Group B	Consadole Sapporo	1–2	Kashima Antlers	Sapporo Dome
Wednesday 20:00	Sakaki 16'; Thiago Quirino (yellow card) 32' (yellow-red card) 39'; Miyazawa (yellow card) 85'	Summary	Juninho 85' (pen.); Okamoto 90+4'	Attendance: 6,877; Referee: (Japan) Takuto Okabe

16 May 2012 Group B	Yokohama F. Marinos	3–2	Kashima Antlers	Nissan Stadium
Wednesday 20:00	Hyodo 38' (pen.); Saitō 84'; Oguro 86'	Summary	Endo 58'; Juninho 69'	Attendance: 9,693; Referee: (Japan) Takumi Takagi

6 June 2012 Group B	Albirex Niigata	0–1	Kashima Antlers	Tohoku Electric Power Big Swan Stadium
Wednesday 20:00	Homma (yellow card) 34'	Summary	Iwamasa (yellow card) 77'; Osako 86'	Attendance: 9,986; Referee: (Japan) Ryuji Sato

27 June 2012 Group B	Kashima Antlers	2–1	Shimizu S-Pulse	Kashima Soccer Stadium
Wednesday 20:00	Shouma Doi (yellow card) 69'; Osako 75', 90' (pen.); Araiba (yellow card) 79'	Summary	Ito 14'; Muramatsu (yellow card) 86'; Yamamoto (yellow card) 89'	Attendance: 6,207; Referee: (Japan) Hiroshi Yamaguchi

25 July 2012 Quarter Final First Leg	Kashima Antlers	2–1	Cerezo Osaka	Kashima Soccer Stadium
Wednesday 20:00	Iwamasa 22'; Koroki 25'; Nishi (yellow card) 62'	Summary	Kakitani 33'; Yoshino (yellow card) 83'; Kurogi (yellow card) 90+4'	Attendance: 6,203; Referee: (England) Kevin Friend

8 August 2012 Quarter Final Second Leg	Cerezo Osaka	0–3 (1–5 agg.)	Kashima Antlers	Kincho Stadium
Wednesday 20:00	Yoshino (yellow card) 71'	Summary	Dutra 28'; Koroki 63' (pen.); Shibasaki 70'; Ogasawara (yellow card) 76'	Attendance: 9,555; Referee: (Japan) Nobutsugu Murakami

5 September 2012 Semi Final First Leg	Kashima Antlers	3–2	Kashiwa Reysol	Kashima Soccer Stadium
Wednesday 20:00	Osako 7', 69'; Aoki (yellow card) 29'; Renato Cajá 36'; Ogasawara (yellow card) 85'	Summary	Leandro Domingues (yellow card) 20' (goal) 62'; Barada 35'; Kurisawa (yellow card) 39'; Nasu (yellow card) 59'	Attendance: 9,115; Referee: (Japan) Hajime Matsuo

13 October 2012 Semi Final Second Leg	Kashiwa Reysol	2–2 (4–5 agg.)	Kashima Antlers	Hitachi Kashiwa Soccer Stadium
Saturday 20:00	Jorge Wagner 37'; Barada (yellow card) 38'; Neto Biano 90+4'	Summary	Dutra 12'; Osako 24'	Attendance: 13,527; Referee: (Japan) Yuichi Nishimura

3 November 2012 Final	Shimizu S-Pulse	–	Kashima Antlers	National Olympic Stadium (Tokyo)
Saturday 13:05

=== Emperor's Cup ===
8 September 2012 Round 2	Kashima Antlers	7–1	University of Tsukuba	Kashima
13:00	Endo 35', 38', 72'; Juninho 53'; Aoki 69'; Okamoto 76'; Shoji 84'	Report	Shuhei Akasaki 90+3'	Stadium: Kashima Soccer Stadium; Attendance: 3,191; Referee: Minoru Tojo

10 October 2012 Round 2	Kashima Antlers	2–1 (a.e.t.)	Gainare Tottori	Kashima
19:00	Masuda 40'; Koroki 110'	Report	Mio 75'	Stadium: Kashima Soccer Stadium; Attendance: 2,606; Referee: Hiroyuki Kimura
