= Hitoshi Sogahata =

Japanese footballer (born 1979)

Hitoshi Sogahata 曽ヶ端 準
Personal information
- Date of birth: August 2, 1979 (age 47)
- Place of birth: Kashima, Ibaraki, Japan
- Height: 1.87 m (6 ft 2 in)
- Position: Goalkeeper

Team information
- Current team: Kashima Antlers (Goalkeeper Coach)

Youth career
- 1986–1991: Namino SSS
- 1992–1994: Kashima Junior High School
- 1995–1997: Kashima Antlers

Senior career*
| Years | Team | Apps | (Gls) |
| 1998–2020 | Kashima Antlers | 533 | (0) |
| Total | | 533 | (0) |

International career
| 2004 | Japan Olympic (O.P.) | 3 | (0) |
| 2001–2003 | Japan | 4 | (0) |

Managerial career
- 2021–: Kashima Antlers (goalkeeper coach)
Medal record
Kashima Antlers
| Winner | AFC Champions League | 2018 |
| Winner | J1 League | 1998 |
| Winner | J1 League | 2000 |
| Winner | J1 League | 2001 |
| Winner | J1 League | 2007 |
| Winner | J1 League | 2008 |
| Winner | J1 League | 2009 |
| Winner | J1 League | 2016 |
| Runner-up | J1 League | 2017 |
| Winner | J.League Cup | 2000 |
| Winner | J.League Cup | 2002 |
| Winner | J.League Cup | 2011 |
| Winner | J.League Cup | 2012 |
| Winner | J.League Cup | 2015 |
| Runner-up | J.League Cup | 1999 |
| Runner-up | J.League Cup | 2003 |
| Runner-up | J.League Cup | 2006 |
| Winner | Emperor's Cup | 2000 |
| Winner | Emperor's Cup | 2007 |
| Winner | Emperor's Cup | 2010 |
| Winner | Emperor's Cup | 2016 |
| Runner-up | Emperor's Cup | 2002 |
Representing Japan
AFC U-16 Championship
| Gold medal – first place | 1994 Qatar |
- * Club domestic league appearances and goals

Hitoshi Sogahata (曽ヶ端 準, Sogahata Hitoshi; born 2 August 1979) is a Japanese former professional footballer who played as a goalkeeper for Kashima Antlers and the Japan national team.

== Playing career ==
Sogahata was born in Kashima on 2 August 1979. He joined J1 League club Kashima Antlers based in his local from youth team in 1998. He debuted against Avispa Fukuoka on 8 May 1999 and played several matches until 2000. Although he could not play many matches behind Japan national team player Daijiro Takakuwa until 2000, Sogahata played in semifinals and final at 2000 J.League Cup and Antlers won the champions. He was also selected New Hero Awards. In 2001, he became a regular goalkeeper instead Takakuwa and Sogahata played as regular goalkeeper for long time. Antlers won the champions 2001 J1 League for two consecutive seasons. In 2002 season, he was selected Best Eleven award. Antlers also won the champions in 2002 J.League Cup. In 2007, Antlers won the champions in J1 League for the first time in six years. Antlers also won the champions in 2007 Emperor's Cup. Antlers won the champions in J1 League for three consecutive seasons (2007–2009). From 2010 season, Antlers won the champions 2010 Emperor's Cup, 2011 and 2012 J.League Cup. He also played all matches from 2008 season to 2014 season. He played for 244 consecutive matches until last match in 2014 season which is J1 League record. In 2015, although he could not play all matches in J1 League, Antlers won the champions in J.League Cup. In 2016, Antlers won the champions in J1 League and qualified for 2016 Club World Cup as host country champions. At Club World Cup, he played all four matches and won the 2nd place. In 2017, Antlers gained new goalkeeper Kwoun Sun-tae and Sogahata battles for the position with Kwoun Sun-tae. However Sogahata could not play many matches behind Kwoun Sun-tae from 2017. In 2018 AFC Champions League, he played four matches and Antlers won the champions first Asian title in the club history.

On 24 December 2020, Sogahata announced his retirement after more than twenty years with the club thus joining the backroom staff at the club as a goalkeeper coach from the 2021 season onwards.

== International career ==
On November 7, 2001, Sogahata debuted for Japan national team against Italy. However he could not play many matches behind Yoshikatsu Kawaguchi and Seigo Narazaki. Sogahata was a member of Japan for 2002 FIFA World Cup. He played three games for Japan until 2003.

In August 2004, Sogahata was selected Japan U23 national team as over aged for 2004 Summer Olympics. At this tournament, he played full time in all three matches. Japan exited in the first round, having finished fourth in group B, below group winners Paraguay, Italy and Ghana.

== Career statistics ==
=== Club ===
Appearances and goals by club, season and competition
| Club | Season | League | | | Emperor's Cup | | J.League Cup | | Asia | | Other (Note: Includes Japanese Super Cup, Suruga Bank Championship, J.League Championship and FIFA Club World Cup.) | | Total | |
| Club | Season | Division | Apps | Goals | Apps | Goals | Apps | Goals | Apps | Goals | Apps | Goals | Apps | Goals |
|---|---|---|---|---|---|---|---|---|---|---|---|---|---|---|
| Kashima Antlers | 1998 | J1 League | 0 | 0 | 0 | 0 | 0 | 0 | – | | – | | 0 | 0 |
| Kashima Antlers | 1999 | J1 League | 4 | 0 | 0 | 0 | 0 | 0 | – | | – | | 4 | 0 |
| Kashima Antlers | 2000 | J1 League | 2 | 0 | 1 | 0 | 3 | 0 | – | | – | | 6 | 0 |
| Kashima Antlers | 2001 | J1 League | 21 | 0 | 2 | 0 | 6 | 0 | – | | 2 | 0 | 31 | 0 |
| Kashima Antlers | 2002 | J1 League | 30 | 0 | 5 | 0 | 3 | 0 | 5 | 0 | 1 | 0 | 44 | 0 |
| Kashima Antlers | 2003 | J1 League | 30 | 0 | 4 | 0 | 5 | 0 | 0 | 0 | – | | 39 | 0 |
| Kashima Antlers | 2004 | J1 League | 27 | 0 | 3 | 0 | 6 | 0 | – | | – | | 36 | 0 |
| Kashima Antlers | 2005 | J1 League | 34 | 0 | 3 | 0 | 4 | 0 | – | | – | | 41 | 0 |
| Kashima Antlers | 2006 | J1 League | 22 | 0 | 4 | 0 | 3 | 0 | – | | – | | 29 | 0 |
| Kashima Antlers | 2007 | J1 League | 32 | 0 | 5 | 0 | 10 | 0 | – | | – | | 47 | 0 |
| Kashima Antlers | 2008 | J1 League | 34 | 0 | 2 | 0 | 2 | 0 | 8 | 0 | 1 | 0 | 47 | 0 |
| Kashima Antlers | 2009 | J1 League | 34 | 0 | 4 | 0 | 2 | 0 | 7 | 0 | 1 | 0 | 48 | 0 |
| Kashima Antlers | 2010 | J1 League | 34 | 0 | 6 | 0 | 2 | 0 | 7 | 0 | 1 | 0 | 50 | 0 |
| Kashima Antlers | 2011 | J1 League | 34 | 0 | 3 | 0 | 3 | 0 | 7 | 0 | 1 | 0 | 48 | 0 |
| Kashima Antlers | 2012 | J1 League | 34 | 0 | 4 | 0 | 9 | 0 | – | | 1 | 0 | 48 | 0 |
| Kashima Antlers | 2013 | J1 League | 34 | 0 | 3 | 0 | 6 | 0 | – | | 1 | 0 | 40 | 0 |
| Kashima Antlers | 2014 | J1 League | 34 | 0 | 1 | 0 | 5 | 0 | – | | – | | 0 | 0 |
| Kashima Antlers | 2015 | J1 League | 24 | 0 | 0 | 0 | 5 | 0 | 6 | 0 | – | | 35 | 0 |
| Kashima Antlers | 2016 | J1 League | 34 | 0 | 6 | 0 | 2 | 0 | – | | 8 | 0 | 50 | 0 |
| Kashima Antlers | 2017 | J1 League | 23 | 0 | 3 | 0 | 1 | 0 | 1 | 0 | 0 | 0 | 28 | 0 |
| Kashima Antlers | 2018 | J1 League | 7 | 0 | 3 | 0 | 4 | 0 | 4 | 0 | 1 | 0 | 19 | 0 |
| Kashima Antlers | 2019 | J1 League | 4 | 0 | 4 | 0 | 1 | 0 | 1 | 0 | – | | 10 | 0 |
| Kashima Antlers | 2020 | J1 League | 1 | 0 | – | | 1 | 0 | 0 | 0 | – | | 2 | 0 |
| Career total | | | 533 | 0 | 66 | 0 | 83 | 0 | 46 | 0 | 18 | 0 | 744 | 0 |

=== International ===
Appearances and goals by national team and year
| National team | Year | Apps | Goals |
|---|---|---|---|
| Japan | 2001 | 1 | 0 |
| Japan | 2002 | 1 | 0 |
| Japan | 2003 | 2 | 0 |
| Total | | 4 | 0 |

== Honours ==
Kashima Antlers

- J1 League (6): 2000, 2001, 2007, 2008, 2009, 2016
- Emperor's Cup: 2000, 2007, 2010, 2016
- J.League Cup: 2000, 2002, 2011, 2012, 2015
- Japanese Super Cup: 1999, 2009, 2010, 2017
- AFC Champions League: 2018

Individual

- J.League Cup New Hero Award : 2001
- J.League Best Eleven – 2002
