= Takeshi Aoki =

Japanese football player (born 1982)

Takeshi Aoki 青木 剛
Personal information
- Full name: Takeshi Aoki
- Date of birth: 28 September 1982 (age 44)
- Place of birth: Takasaki, Gunma, Japan
- Height: 1.83 m (6 ft 0 in)
- Positions: Defender; midfielder

Team information
- Current team: Nankatsu SC
- Number: 15

Youth career
- 1998–2000: Maebashi Ikuei High School

Senior career*
Years	Team	Apps	(Gls)
2001–2016	Kashima Antlers	376	(8)
2016–2017	Sagan Tosu	24	(0)
2018	Roasso Kumamoto	26	(0)
2019–	Nankatsu SC		
Total		426	(8)

International career
2001	Japan U-20	3	(0)
2008–2009	Japan	2	(0)
Medal record
Kashima Antlers
Winner	J1 League	2001
Winner	J1 League	2007
Winner	J1 League	2008
Winner	J1 League	2009
Winner	J1 League	2016
Winner	J.League Cup	2002
Winner	J.League Cup	2011
Winner	J.League Cup	2012
Winner	J.League Cup	2015
Runner-up	J.League Cup	2003
Runner-up	J.League Cup	2006
Winner	Emperor's Cup	2007
Winner	Emperor's Cup	2010
Winner	Emperor's Cup	2016
Runner-up	Emperor's Cup	2002
Representing Japan
Asian Games
Silver medal – second place	2002 Busan	Team
AFC U-19 Championship
Silver medal – second place	2000 Iran
- * Club domestic league appearances and goals as of end of 2018 season

Takeshi Aoki (青木 剛, Aoki Takeshi; born 28 September 1982) is a Japanese football player. He played for Japan national team.

== Club career ==
Aoki was born in Takasaki on 28 September 1982. After graduating from high school, he joined J1 League club Kashima Antlers in 2001. He played as defensive midfielder from first season and Antlers won the champions in 2001 J1 League and 2002 J.League Cup. He became a regular player from 2003 season and played many matches for a long time. In 2007, Antlers won the champions in J1 League for the first time in 6 years and Emperor's Cup. Antlers won the champions in J1 League for 3 years in a row (2007-2009).

From 2010 season, although his opportunity to play as starting member decreased, Antlers won the champions 2010 Emperor's Cup, 2011 and 2012 J.League Cup. From 2012, he played many matches as center back. Antlers won the champions in 2015 J.League Cup. However he could hardly play in the match in 2016.

In July 2016, Aoki moved to Sagan Tosu. He played for the club in 2 seasons. In 2018, he moved to J2 League club Roasso Kumamoto. In 2019, he moved to Prefectural Leagues club Nankatsu SC.

== National team career ==
In June 2001, Aoki was selected Japan U-20 national team for 2001 World Youth Championship. At this tournament, he played full time in all 3 matches as defensive midfielder.

He made his international debut for Japan on 20 August 2008 in a friendly against Uruguay at Sapporo Dome.

== Club statistics ==
As of end of 2018 season

Club performance			League		Cup		League Cup		Continental		Total	
Season	Club	League	Apps	Goals	Apps	Goals	Apps	Goals	Apps	Goals	Apps	Goals
Japan			League		Emperor's Cup		J.League Cup		AFC		Total	
2001	Kashima Antlers	J1 League	8	0	0	0	0	0	-		8	0
2002	Kashima Antlers	J1 League	13	0	4	0	7	0	-		24	0
2003	Kashima Antlers	J1 League	27	1	4	1	4	0	3	1	38	3
2004	Kashima Antlers	J1 League	20	0	3	0	6	0	-		29	0
2005	Kashima Antlers	J1 League	32	0	2	0	6	0	-		40	0
2006	Kashima Antlers	J1 League	31	2	4	0	6	0	-		41	2
2007	Kashima Antlers	J1 League	30	0	5	0	10	0	-		45	0
2008	Kashima Antlers	J1 League	34	2	2	0	2	0	8	0	46	2
2009	Kashima Antlers	J1 League	33	0	3	0	2	0	6	2	44	2
2010	Kashima Antlers	J1 League	23	0	5	0	2	0	6	0	36	0
2011	Kashima Antlers	J1 League	23	0	3	0	3	0	7	0	36	0
2012	Kashima Antlers	J1 League	28	0	5	1	9	0	-		42	1
2013	Kashima Antlers	J1 League	34	2	2	0	7	0	-		43	2
2014	Kashima Antlers	J1 League	18	1	1	0	2	0	-		21	1
2015	Kashima Antlers	J1 League	21	0	1	0	3	0	1	0	26	0
2016	Kashima Antlers	J1 League	1	0	0	0	4	0	–		5	0
Total			376	8	44	2	73	0	31	3	524	13
2016	Sagan Tosu	J1 League	7	0	2	0	0	0	–		9	0
2017	Sagan Tosu	J1 League	17	0	2	1	5	0	–		24	1
Total			24	0	4	1	5	0	–		33	1
2018	Roasso Kumamoto	J2 League	26	0	0	0	–		–		26	0
Total			26	0	0	0	–		–		26	0
Career total			426	8	48	3	78	0	31	3	583	14

== National team statistics ==
Japan national team
Year	Apps	Goals
2008	1	0
2009	1	0
Total	2	0

=== Appearances in major competitions ===
Team	Competition	Category	Appearances		Goals	Team record
Team	Competition	Category	Start	Sub	Goals	Team record
Japan	2011 AFC Asian Cup qualification	Senior	1	0	0	Qualified

== Team honors ==
- A3 Champions Cup – 2003
- J1 League – 2001, 2007, 2008, 2009
- Emperor's Cup – 2007
- J.League Cup – 2002
- Japanese Super Cup – 2009
