= Daiki Iwamasa =

Japanese footballer and manager

Daiki Iwamasa 岩政 大樹
Personal information
- Full name: Iwamasa Daiki
- Date of birth: 30 January 1982 (age 44)
- Place of birth: Suo-Oshima, Yamaguchi, Japan
- Height: 1.87 m (6 ft 2 in)
- Position: Defender

Youth career
- 1997–1999: Iwakuni High School

College career
Years	Team	Apps	(Gls)
2000–2003	Tokyo Gakugei University		

Senior career*
Years	Team	Apps	(Gls)
2004–2013	Kashima Antlers	290	(35)
2014	BEC Tero Sasana	35	(5)
2015–2016	Fagiano Okayama	82	(10)
2017–2018	Tokyo United	32	(6)
Total		439	(56)

International career
2009–2011	Japan	8	(0)

Managerial career
- 2022–2023: Jobu University
- 2022: Kashima Antlers (interim)
- 2022–2023: Kashima Antlers
- 2024: Hà Nội
- 2025: Hokkaido Consadole Sapporo
- 2026–: Tokyo Gakugei University
Medal record
Men's Football
Representing Japan
AFC Asian Cup
Winner	2011 Qatar
- * Club domestic league appearances and goals

Daiki Iwamasa (岩政 大樹, Iwamasa Daiki; born 30 January 1982) is a Japanese professional football manager and former player, who was most recently the manager of J2 League club, Hokkaido Consadole Sapporo. He also played for the Japan national team until 2011.

== Club career ==
Iwamasa was born in Suo-Oshima, Yamaguchi on 30 January 1982. He was educated at and played for Iwakuni High School and Tokyo Gakugei University before turning professional.

=== Kashima Antlers ===
Iwamasa started his professional career at Kashima Antlers where he later became one of the club's longest serving players. He became a regular player at center back from late first season. The club won the title in J1 League for three consecutive seasons (2007–2009) which is the first time in J1 League history. He was also elected in the J.League Best XI for three consecutive years. The club also won 2007, 2010 Emperor's Cup, 2011 and 2012 J.League Cup however his opportunity to play decreased in 2013 and he left the club end of 2013 season.

=== BEC Tero Sasana ===
In 2014, Iwamasa moved to Thailand to join BEC Tero Sasana which he helped the club to win the 2014 Thai League Cup where he scored a goal in the final that ended in a 2–0 victory.

=== Fagiano Okayama ===
In 2015, Iwamasa returned to Japan and joined J2 League side, Fagiano Okayama ahead of the 2015 season.

=== Tokyo United ===
In 2017, Iwamasa moved to sixth tier Regional Leagues side, Tokyo United. He retired at the end of the 2018 season.

== International career ==
Iwamasa was the captain of the Japan team that won the 2003 Summer Universiade held in Daegu, South Korea, where he scored a goal in the final of the tournament. He received the first call-up for Japan national team in 2008 by newly appointed coach Takeshi Okada.

On 10 October 2009, he made his international debut in a friendly match against Scotland. He was also one of the final 23 Japan national football players participating in 2010 FIFA World Cup in South Africa although did not play any minute during the tournament. After the 2010 FIFA World Cup, in January 2011, he was selected Japan for 2011 AFC Asian Cup by new manager Alberto Zaccheroni. At the 2011 AFC Asian Cup, he played in four matches and Japan was the eventual champions. He played eight games for Japan until 2011.

== Managerial career ==
=== Jobu University ===
After retiring as a player in 2018, in 2021 he became manager of Jobu University's football team.

=== Kashima Antlers ===
For the 2022 season, Iwamasa became the assistant manager of Kashima Antlers and took charge of a number of games whilst new manager René Weiler awaited entry to the country due to COVID-19 quarantine restrictions. In August 2022, it was announced that Iwamasa would be promoted to manager of Kashima Antlers following the departure of Weiler.

The first game in the charge was 2–0 home win by J1 League against Avispa Fukuoka on 14 August 2022. But the in the nine games after. only one win against Vissel Kobe in Emperor's Cup, the team was knocked out by second-tier team Ventforet Kofu after defeat by 1–0. Ending the season in fourth place, three points behind of the AFC Champions League slots occupied by Sanfrecce Hiroshima.

The 2023 Season starts with an away victory over Kyoto Sanga by 0–2. The first match at home was a defeat against current runners-up Kawasaki Frontale by 1–2. Following this, the team collected mixed results in the Emperor's Cup. They were knocked out by the defending champions, Ventforet Kofu for a consecutive season after a 1–1 draw, the team lost 10–11 in the penalty shootout. Following the end of the campaign, Antlers won the last match of the competition against the relegated team Yokohama FC.), ending the aspirations for qualification to AFC Tournaments after a 3–1 defeat to Vissel Kobe.

On 5 December 2023 the board announced the Iwamasa's contract was not renewed for the 2024 season.

=== Hà Nội ===
On 11 January 2024, Iwamasa was named as the manager of V.League 1 club Hà Nội. He lost his first V.League 1 match, 2–0 at away to Dong A Thanh Hoa on 18 February. He resigned his role as head coach on 8 July.

=== Hokkaido Consadole Sapporo ===
On 12 December 2024, Iwamasa was announced as manager of newly relegated club Hokkaido Consadole Sapporo for the 2025 J2 League season. Due to the club under-performing in the second tier and finding themselves in 11th place, in August 2025 Iwamasa was dismissed from his role.

== Career statistics ==
=== Club ===
As of 1 January 2015

Appearances and goals by club, season and competition
Club	Season	League			Emperor's Cup		J.League Cup		Asia		Total	
Club	Season	Division	Apps	Goals	Apps	Goals	Apps	Goals	Apps	Goals	Apps	Goals
Kashima Antlers	2004	J1 League	18	4	3	0	4	0	–		25	4
Kashima Antlers	2005	J1 League	31	4	3	0	6	2	–		40	6
Kashima Antlers	2006	J1 League	30	3	4	2	11	1	–		45	6
Kashima Antlers	2007	J1 League	33	6	5	0	10	0	–		48	6
Kashima Antlers	2008	J1 League	33	2	2	0	2	0	8	2	45	4
Kashima Antlers	2009	J1 League	33	4	2	0	2	0	6	0	43	4
Kashima Antlers	2010	J1 League	34	3	3	1	1	0	7	0	45	4
Kashima Antlers	2011	J1 League	28	6	1	0	1	0	7	0	37	6
Kashima Antlers	2012	J1 League	32	3	3	1	7	1	–		42	5
Kashima Antlers	2013	J1 League	18	0	1	0	5	0	–		24	0
BEC Tero Sasana	2014	Premier League	37	5	2	0	6	1	–		45	6
Fagiano Okayama	2015	J2 League	42	4	1	0	–		–		43	4
Career total			327	40	29	4	55	5	28	2	439	51

=== International ===
Appearances and goals by national team and year
National team	Year	Apps	Goals
Japan	2009	1	0
Japan	2010	3	0
Japan	2011	4	0
Total		8	0

== Managerial record ==
As of 9 August 2025

Managerial record by team and tenure
Team	From	To	Record				
Team	From	To	G	W	D	L	Win %
Kashima Antlers	1 February 2022	17 March 2022	5	3	0	2	60.00
Kashima Antlers	8 August 2022	31 January 2024	56	21	18	17	37.50
Hanoi	1 February 2024	7 July 2024	22	13	4	5	59.09
Hokkaido Consadole Sapporo	1 February 2025	10 August 2025	27	10	5	12	37.04
Total			110	47	27	36	42.73

== Honours ==
=== Club ===
Kashima Antlers

- J1 League: 2007, 2008, 2009
- Emperor's Cup: 2007, 2010
- J.League Cup: 2011, 2012
- Japanese Super Cup: 2009, 2010

BEC Tero Sasana

- Thai League Cup: 2014

=== International ===
Japan

- AFC Asian Cup: 2011

=== Individual ===
- J.League Best XI: 2007, 2008, 2009
