= 2010 Japanese Super Cup =

| Kashima Antlers | Gamba Osaka |
| 1 | 1 |
- Kashima Antlers won 5–3 on penalties
- Date: 27 February 2010
- Venue: Tokyo National Stadium, Tokyo
- Referee: Yuichi Nishimura
- Attendance: 34,634

The 2010 Japanese Super Cup was held on 27 February 2010 between the 2009 J. League champions Kashima Antlers and the 2009 Emperor's Cup winner Gamba Osaka. The match was drawn 1–1 at the end of regulation time and Kashima Antlers went on to win the match 5–3 in penalties.

== Match details ==
27 February 2010
13:36 JST

| Kashima Antlers | 1–1 | Gamba Osaka |
|---|---|---|
| Marquinhos 20' | Report | 45+1' Kaji |
Penalties
| Ogasawara (penalty scored); Nozawa (penalty scored); Araiba (penalty scored); Iwamasa (penalty scored); Marquinhos (penalty scored) | 5–3 | (penalty missed) Endo; (penalty scored) Futagawa; (penalty scored) Lucas; (penalty scored) Cho |

Tokyo National Stadium
Attendance: 34,634
Referee: (Japan) Yuichi Nishimura

== See also ==
- 2009 J. League Division 1
- 2009 Emperor's Cup
