= Takuya Nozawa =

Japanese footballer

Takuya Nozawa 野沢 拓也
Personal information
- Full name: Takuya Nozawa
- Date of birth: August 12, 1981 (age 45)
- Place of birth: Kasama, Ibaraki, Japan
- Height: 1.76 m (5 ft 9 1/2 in)
- Position: Midfielder

Youth career
- 1994–1999: Kashima Antlers

Senior career*
Years	Team	Apps	(Gls)
1999–2011	Kashima Antlers	254	(50)
1999	→ CFZ (loan)		
2012	Vissel Kobe	33	(5)
2013–2014	Kashima Antlers	31	(5)
2014–2017	Vegalta Sendai	66	(10)
2018	Wollongong Wolves	19	(1)
2019–2020	FC Tiamo Hirakata	21	(16)
Total		417	(85)
Medal record
Kashima Antlers
Winner	J1 League	2000
Winner	J1 League	2001
Winner	J1 League	2007
Winner	J1 League	2008
Winner	J1 League	2009
Winner	J.League Cup	2000
Winner	J.League Cup	2002
Winner	J.League Cup	2011
Runner-up	J.League Cup	1999
Runner-up	J.League Cup	2003
Runner-up	J.League Cup	2006
Winner	Emperor's Cup	2000
Winner	Emperor's Cup	2007
Winner	Emperor's Cup	2010
Runner-up	Emperor's Cup	2002
Representing Japan
Asian Games
Silver medal – second place	2002 Busan	Team
- * Club domestic league appearances and goals as of 4 January 2021

Takuya Nozawa (野沢 拓也, Nozawa Takuya; born August 12, 1981) is a Japanese former football player.

== Playing career ==
Nozawa was born in Kasama on August 12, 1981. He joined J1 League club Kashima Antlers in 1999. On April 10, when he was 17 years old, he debuted against Kyoto Purple Sanga. In early 2000s, he could not play many matches behind Mitsuo Ogasawara, Masashi Motoyama so on. From 2005, he played many matches and he completely became a regular as offensive midfielder after Ogasawara moved to Italy in September 2006. The club also won the champions for 3 years in a row (2007-2009). In 2012, he moved to Vissel Kobe. Although he played as regular player, the club was relegated to J2 League end of 2012 season. In 2013, he returned to Kashima Antlers. Although he played as regular player in early 2013, his opportunity to play decreased from late 2013.

In August 2014, he moved to Vegalta Sendai. He played as regular player until 2015. However his opportunity to play decreased from 2016. In 2018, he moved to Australian club Wollongong Wolves. In 2019, he returned to Japan and joined Regional Leagues club FC Tiamo Hirakata. He retired at the end of the 2020 season.

== Club statistics ==
Updated to 1 January 2020.

Club performance			League		Cup		League Cup		Continental		Total	
Season	Club	League	Apps	Goals	Apps	Goals	Apps	Goals	Apps	Goals	Apps	Goals
Japan			League		Emperor's Cup		J.League Cup		AFC		Total	
1999	Kashima Antlers	J1 League	1	0	0	0	0	0	-		1	0
2000	Kashima Antlers	J1 League	0	0	0	0	1	0	-		1	0
2001	Kashima Antlers	J1 League	5	0	2	1	0	0	-		7	1
2002	Kashima Antlers	J1 League	13	0	3	0	6	2	-		22	2
2003	Kashima Antlers	J1 League	5	0	4	2	1	0	2	1	12	3
2004	Kashima Antlers	J1 League	16	2	3	1	7	3	-		26	6
2005	Kashima Antlers	J1 League	28	10	3	1	2	0	-		33	11
2006	Kashima Antlers	J1 League	29	9	1	0	11	1	-		41	10
2007	Kashima Antlers	J1 League	29	5	5	0	6	1	-		40	6
2008	Kashima Antlers	J1 League	27	3	2	0	2	0	6	4	37	7
2009	Kashima Antlers	J1 League	33	7	4	2	2	0	7	2	46	11
2010	Kashima Antlers	J1 League	34	8	5	2	2	0	7	1	48	11
2011	Kashima Antlers	J1 League	34	6	2	1	3	0	7	2	46	9
2012	Vissel Kobe	J1 League	33	5	1	0	4	0	-		38	5
2013	Kashima Antlers	J1 League	23	4	2	1	8	0	-		33	5
2014	Kashima Antlers	J1 League	8	1	0	0	4	1	-		13	2
2014	Vegalta Sendai	J1 League	16	2	0	0	0	0	-		16	2
2015	Vegalta Sendai	J1 League	29	4	3	1	3	0	-		35	5
2016	Vegalta Sendai	J1 League	18	3	1	0	4	0	-		23	3
2017	Vegalta Sendai	J1 League	3	1	0	0	8	0	-		11	1
2018	Wollongong Wolves	NPL	19	1	0	0	0	0	-		19	1
2019	FC Tiamo Hirakata	JRL (Kansai)	14	14	-		-		-		14	14
Career total			417	85	41	12	74	8	29	10	561	115

== Team honors ==
- A3 Champions Cup – 2003
- J1 League – 2000, 2001, 2007, 2008, 2009
- Emperor's Cup – 2007, 2010
- J.League Cup – 2000, 2002, 2011
- Japanese Super Cup – 2009, 2010
- Suruga Bank Championship – 2013
