= Gō Ōiwa =

Japanese footballer and manager

Gō Ōiwa 大岩 剛
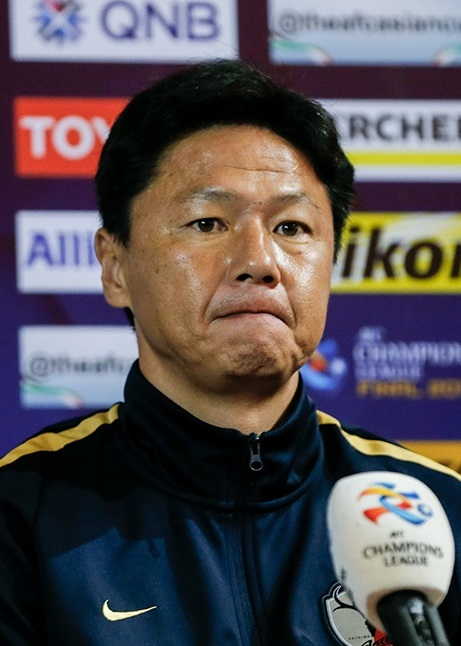
- Ōiwa in 2018

Personal information
- Full name: Gō Ōiwa
- Date of birth: 23 June 1972 (age 54)
- Place of birth: Shizuoka, Shizuoka, Japan
- Height: 1.80 m (5 ft 11 in)
- Position: Defender

Team information
- Current team: Japan U23 (manager)

Youth career
- 1988–1990: Shimizu Shogyo High School

College career
Years	Team	Apps	(Gls)
1991–1994	University of Tsukuba		

Senior career*
Years	Team	Apps	(Gls)
1995–2000	Nagoya Grampus Eight	172	(6)
2000–2002	Júbilo Iwata	49	(2)
2003–2010	Kashima Antlers	165	(2)
Total		386	(10)

International career
2000	Japan	3	(0)

Managerial career
- 2011–2017: Kashima Antlers (assistant)
- 2017–2020: Kashima Antlers
- 2021–: Japan U23
Medal record
Men's football
Representing Japan (as manager)
AFC U-23 Asian Cup
Third place	2022 Uzbekistan
Winner	2024 Qatar
Winner	2026 Saudi Arabia
Asian Games
Silver medal – second place	2022 Hangzhou
Silver medal – second place	2026 Aichi–Nagoya
- * Club domestic league appearances and goals

Gō Ōiwa (大岩 剛, Ōiwa Gō; born 23 June 1972) is a Japanese football manager and former player who is the manager of the Japan under-23 national team.

== Playing career ==
Ōiwa was born in Shizuoka on June 23, 1972. After graduating from the University of Tsukuba, he joined Nagoya Grampus Eight in 1995. From his first season, he established a centre-back partnership with Alexandre Torres. The club won the 1995 and 1999 Emperor's Cup. In Asia, the club were runners-up in the 1996–97 Asian Cup Winners' Cup. He moved to Júbilo Iwata in September 2000. The club won the 2002 J1 League and were runners-up in the 2000–01 Asian Club Championship. In 2003, he moved to rival club Kashima Antlers, who had competed for the title with Júbilo. He played as a centre-back with Yutaka Akita or Daiki Iwamasa. Although his opportunity to play decreased from 2007, the club were champions for three years in a row (2007–2009). The club also won the 2007 and 2010 Emperor's Cup. He retired at the end of the 2010 season.

On February 5, 2000, Ōiwa debuted for Japan national team against Mexico. He played three games for Japan in 2000.

== Managerial career ==
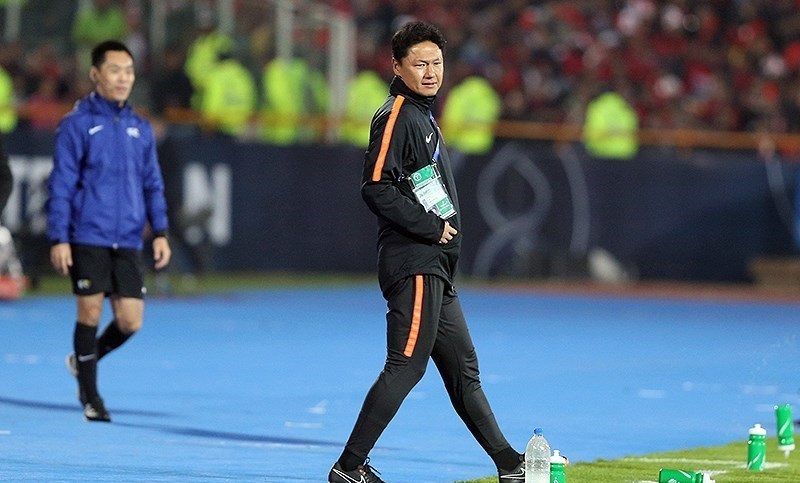
Ōiwa managing Kashima in the second leg of the 2018 AFC Champions League Final

After retirement, Ōiwa became a coach for Kashima Antlers in 2011. In May 2017, he became the new manager, succeeding Masatada Ishii. In the 2018 AFC Champions League, he led the team to the final against Persepolis. Ōiwa overcame the absence of five injured players, in addition to the fatigue at the end of the season after playing 52 matches, Kashima Antlers beat Persepolis with two goals in the first leg. After a goalless draw in the second leg, the club won the AFC Champions League.

It was revealed on the 23rd of July 2026 that Gō Ōiwa would take charge of the Japan National Football team in March 2027 with current manager Hajime Moriyasu stepping down.

== Career statistics ==
=== Club ===
Appearances and goals by club, season and competition
Club	Season	League			Emperor's Cup		J.League Cup		Asia		Total	
Club	Season	Division	Apps	Goals	Apps	Goals	Apps	Goals	Apps	Goals	Apps	Goals
Nagoya Grampus Eight	1995	J1 League	38	0	4	0	—		—		42	0
Nagoya Grampus Eight	1996	J1 League	27	1	1	0	12	0	—		40	1
Nagoya Grampus Eight	1997	J1 League	32	1	0	0	7	0	—		39	1
Nagoya Grampus Eight	1998	J1 League	32	2	1	0	4	0	—		37	2
Nagoya Grampus Eight	1999	J1 League	26	2	5	0	4	0	—		35	2
Nagoya Grampus Eight	2000	J1 League	17	0	0	0	0	0	—		17	0
Júbilo Iwata	2000	J1 League	1	0	0	0	1	0	—		2	0
Júbilo Iwata	2001	J1 League	28	2	1	1	7	0	—		36	3
Júbilo Iwata	2002	J1 League	20	0	0	0	6	0	—		26	0
Kashima Antlers	2003	J1 League	29	1	4	0	5	0	3	0	41	1
Kashima Antlers	2004	J1 League	29	0	3	0	6	1	—		38	1
Kashima Antlers	2005	J1 League	30	0	3	0	5	0	—		38	0
Kashima Antlers	2006	J1 League	27	1	1	0	7	0	—		35	1
Kashima Antlers	2007	J1 League	20	0	5	0	6	1	—		31	1
Kashima Antlers	2008	J1 League	18	0	0	0	0	0	8	0	26	0
Kashima Antlers	2009	J1 League	6	0	2	0	0	0	2	1	10	1
Kashima Antlers	2010	J1 League	6	0	5	0	1	0	0	0	12	0
Total			386	10	35	1	71	2	13	1	505	14

=== International ===
Japan national team
Year	Apps	Goals
2000	3	0
Total	3	0

=== Managerial ===
As of 1 January 2020

Team	From	To	Record				
Team	From	To	G	W	D	L	Win %
Kashima Antlers	31 May 2017	1 January 2020	143	78	32	33	54.55
Total			143	78	32	33	54.55

== Honours ==
=== Player ===
Nagoya Grampus Eight

- Emperor's Cup: 1995, 1999

Júbilo Iwata
• J1 League: 2002
Kashima Antlers

- J1 League: 2007, 2008, 2009
- Emperor's Cup: 2007, 2010
- A3 Champions Cup: 2003

=== Manager ===
Kashima Antlers

- Japanese Super Cup: 2017
- AFC Champions League: 2018

Japan U23

- AFC U-23 Asian Cup: 2024, 2026

=== Individual ===
- J.League Best Eleven: 2001
- Asian Coach of the Year: 2018, 2023
