= Toru Araiba =

Japanese footballer

Toru Araiba 新井場 徹
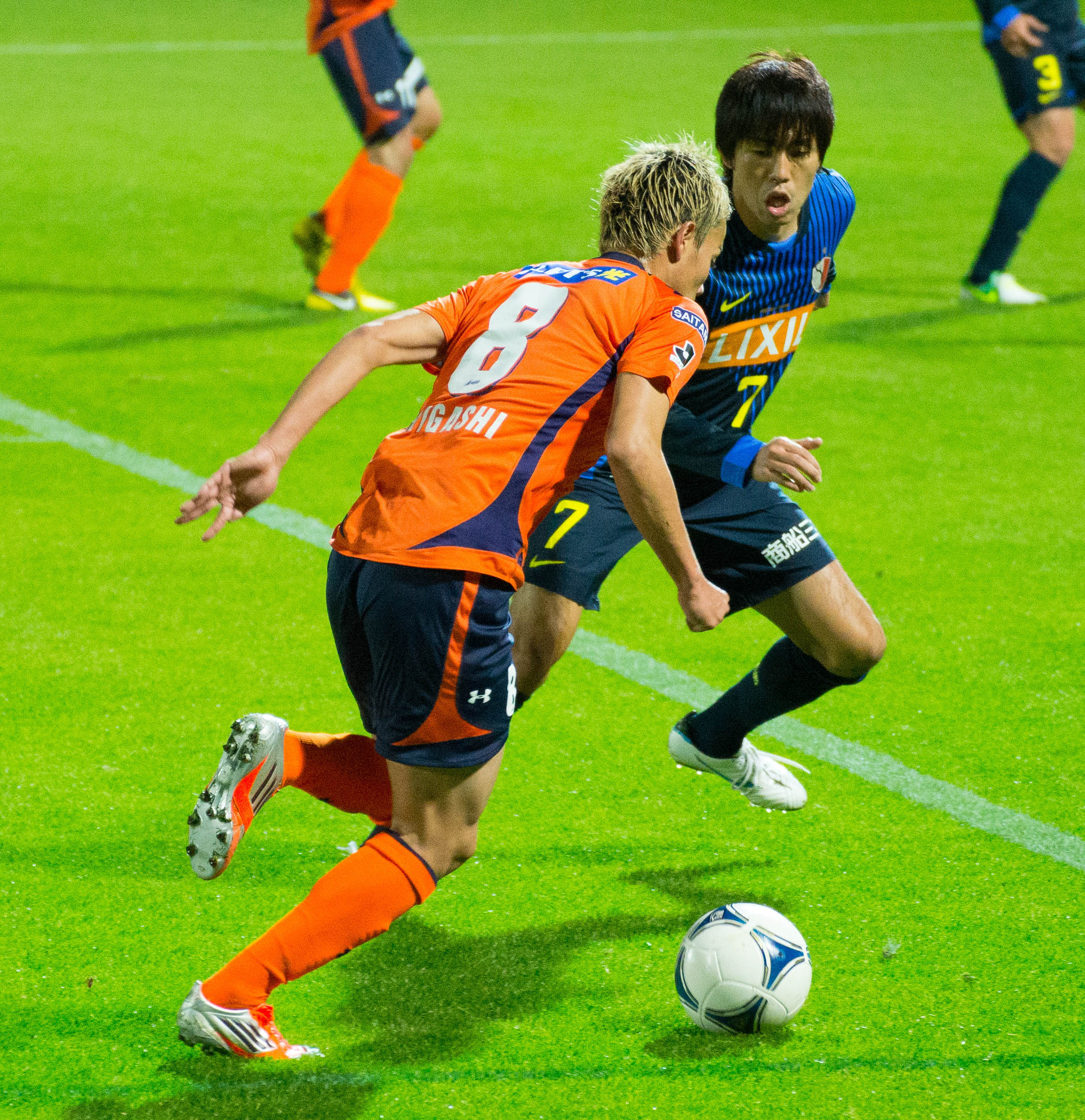
- Araiba (right)

Personal information
- Full name: Toru Araiba
- Date of birth: July 12, 1979 (age 47)
- Place of birth: Hirakata, Osaka, Japan
- Height: 1.82 m (5 ft 11 1/2 in)
- Position: Defender

Youth career
- 1995–1997: Gamba Osaka

Senior career*
Years	Team	Apps	(Gls)
1997–2003	Gamba Osaka	140	(13)
2004–2012	Kashima Antlers	262	(9)
2013–2014	Cerezo Osaka	21	(0)
Total		423	(22)

International career
1995	Japan U-17	3	(0)
Medal record
Kashima Antlers
Winner	J1 League	2007
Winner	J1 League	2008
Winner	J1 League	2009
Winner	J.League Cup	2011
Winner	J.League Cup	2012
Runner-up	J.League Cup	2006
Winner	Emperor's Cup	2007
Winner	Emperor's Cup	2010
- * Club domestic league appearances and goals

Toru Araiba (新井場 徹, Araiba Tōru; born July 12, 1979) is a former Japanese football player.

== Club career ==
Araiba was a product of the youth system of Gamba Osaka. He made two first team appearances for Gamba in 1997 while he still belonged to their youth team. He signed a professional contract in 1998 and started to play regularly for the club's first team. He played mainly as left midfielder. He moved to Kashima Antlers in 2004. He played as left side-back as Naoki Soma successor. The club won the league champions for 3 years in a row (2007-2009). The club also won 2007, 2010 Emperor's Cup, 2011 and 2012 J.League Cup. He moved to his local Osaka league and signed with Cerezo Osaka in 2013. He retired at the end of the 2014 season.

== National team career ==
In August 1995, Araiba was selected Japan U-17 national team for 1995 U-17 World Championship. He played all 3 matches.

== Club statistics ==
Club performance			League		Cup		League Cup		Continental		Total	
Season	Club	League	Apps	Goals	Apps	Goals	Apps	Goals	Apps	Goals	Apps	Goals
Japan			League		Emperor's Cup		J.League Cup		Asia		Total	
1997	Gamba Osaka	J1 League	2	0	0	0	0	0	-		2	0
1998	Gamba Osaka	J1 League	30	0	0	0	3	0	-		33	0
1999	Gamba Osaka	J1 League	0	0	0	0	0	0	-		0	0
2000	Gamba Osaka	J1 League	24	7	1	0	4	1	-		29	8
2001	Gamba Osaka	J1 League	29	3	3	1	4	0	-		36	4
2002	Gamba Osaka	J1 League	30	1	2	0	8	1	-		40	2
2003	Gamba Osaka	J1 League	25	2	2	1	4	1	-		31	4
2004	Kashima Antlers	J1 League	28	1	3	0	7	0	-		38	1
2005	Kashima Antlers	J1 League	28	1	2	0	4	0	-		34	1
2006	Kashima Antlers	J1 League	30	2	4	0	11	0	-		45	2
2007	Kashima Antlers	J1 League	30	1	5	0	9	0	-		44	1
2008	Kashima Antlers	J1 League	30	2	2	0	2	0	7	0	41	2
2009	Kashima Antlers	J1 League	29	0	2	0	2	0	4	0	37	0
2010	Kashima Antlers	J1 League	33	1	2	0	2	0	6	1	44	2
2011	Kashima Antlers	J1 League	23	1	2	0	3	0	7	0	36	1
2012	Kashima Antlers	J1 League	31	0	3	0	10	0	-		44	0
2013	Cerezo Osaka	J1 League	11	0	1	0	4	0	-		16	0
2014	Cerezo Osaka	J1 League	10	0	2	0	1	0	-		13	0
Career total			423	22	39	2	78	3	26	1	566	28

== Team honors ==
- J1 League - 2007, 2008, 2009
- Japanese Super Cup - 2009, 2010
- Emperor's Cup - 2007, 2010
- J.League Cup - 2011, 2012
