= Marquinhos (footballer, born 1976) =

Brazilian footballer

Personal information
- Full name: Marcos Gomes de Araujo
- Date of birth: 23 March 1976 (age 50)
- Place of birth: Rio Brilhante, Brazil
- Height: 1.74 m (5 ft 9 in)
- Position: Striker

Senior career*
Years	Team	Apps	(Gls)
1996–1997	Ourense	18	(2)
1997–1999	Operário	12	(10)
1999–2001	Coritiba	62	(27)
2001–2002	Tokyo Verdy	29	(10)
2003	Yokohama F. Marinos	24	(8)
2004	JEF United Ichihara	14	(12)
2005–2006	Shimizu S-Pulse	43	(20)
2007–2010	Kashima Antlers	119	(59)
2011	Vegalta Sendai	1	(0)
2011	Atlético Mineiro	5	(1)
2012–2013	Yokohama F. Marinos	54	(26)
2014–2015	Vissel Kobe	49	(17)
- * Club domestic league appearances and goals as of 5 February 2016

Marcos Gomes de Araujo, better known as Marquinhos (born 23 March 1976), is a former Brazilian footballer who played as a forward. He has spent his career playing mostly in the J1 League.

== Career ==
Marquinhos started his professional career in Spain with Segunda División side CD Ourense. Then he played with several Brazilian and Japanese teams. He became the J. League Top Scorer top scorer in the 2008 season with 21 goals to his name as Kashima Antlers won the title for the second year in a row.

Marquinhos was awarded J. League Most Valuable Player on 22 December 2008, becoming the second Antlers player to win the highest J.League award after former Brazilian star Jorginho.

On 22 January 2011, Marquinhos left Kashima to join Vegalta Sendai on a permanent deal but left that club on 9 April 2011, suffering emotional instability from the deadly earthquake and tsunami on 11 March. He played for Sendai in only one league match.

On 11 January 2012, Marquinhos returned to the Japanese League to sign with his former club Yokohama F. Marinos.

== Club statistics ==
Club performance			League		Cup		League Cup		Continental		Total	
Season	Club	League	Apps	Goals	Apps	Goals	Apps	Goals	Apps	Goals	Apps	Goals
Japan			League		Emperor's Cup		League Cup		Asia		Total	
2001	Tokyo Verdy	J1 League	14	8	1	1	0	0	-		15	9
2002	Tokyo Verdy	J1 League	15	2	0	0	5	1	-		20	3
2003	Yokohama F. Marinos	J1 League	24	8	0	0	7	4	-		31	12
2004	JEF United Ichihara	J1 League	14	12	0	0	4	1	-		18	13
2005	Shimizu S-Pulse	J1 League	14	9	2	2	0	0	-		16	11
2006	Shimizu S-Pulse	J1 League	29	11	1	2	5	3	-		35	16
2007	Kashima Antlers	J1 League	31	14	5	0	10	4	-		46	18
2008	Kashima Antlers	J1 League	30	21	2	2	2	1	5	5	39	29
2009	Kashima Antlers	J1 League	31	13	3	1	2	0	7	4	43	18
2010	Kashima Antlers	J1 League	27	11	1	1	2	1	6	2	36	15
2011	Vegalta Sendai	J1 League	1	0	0	0	0	0	-		1	0
2012	Yokohama F. Marinos	J1 League	22	10	4	1	2	0	-		28	11
2013	Yokohama F. Marinos	J1 League	32	16	2	3	9	7	-		43	26
2014	Vissel Kobe	J1 League	34	14	1	0	5	2	-		40	16
2015	Vissel Kobe	J1 League	15	3	0	0	3	0	-		18	3
Career total			333	152	22	13	56	24	18	11	429	200

== Awards and honours ==
=== Club ===
Yokohama F. Marinos

- J1 League: 1

2003

Kashima Antlers

- J1 League: 3

2007, 2008, 2009

- Emperor's Cup: 1

2007

- Japanese Super Cup: 2

2009, 2010

=== Individual ===
- J.League Most Valuable Player: 1

2008

- J.League Top Scorer: 1

2008

- J.League Best XI: 1

2008
