= Fellype Gabriel =

Brazilian footballer (born 1985)

Personal information
- Full name: Fellype Gabriel de Melo e Silva
- Date of birth: December 6, 1985 (age 40)
- Place of birth: Rio de Janeiro, Brazil
- Height: 1.76 m (5 ft 9 in)
- Position: Attacking midfielder

Youth career
- 2004: Flamengo

Senior career*
Years	Team	Apps	(Gls)
2005–2008	Flamengo	53	(4)
2007	→ Cruzeiro (loan)	2	(0)
2007–2008	→ Nacional (loan)	14	(2)
2008	→ Portuguesa (loan)	68	(14)
2010–2012	Kashima Antlers	47	(4)
2012–2013	Botafogo	64	(14)
2013–2015	Al Sharjah	23	(5)
2015–2016	Palmeiras	1	(0)
2016	Vasco da Gama	4	(0)
2017–2018	Boavista	15	(5)
Total		291	(48)

International career
2005	Brazil U20	5	(0)
- * Club domestic league appearances and goals

Fellype Gabriel de Melo e Silva or simply Fellype Gabriel (born December 6, 1985), is a Brazilian former professional footballer who played as an attacking midfielder.

He was a member of the Brazil U20 national team at 2005 FIFA World Youth Championship in the Netherlands. On November 13, 2012, Fellype Gabriel was called up, by Mano Menezes, for seleção brasileira that played the Superclásico de las Américas.

== Career statistics ==
Appearances and goals by club, season and competition
Club	Season	League			State league		National cup		League cup		Continental		Other		Total	
Club	Season	Division	Apps	Goals	Apps	Goals	Apps	Goals	Apps	Goals	Apps	Goals	Apps	Goals	Apps	Goals
Flamengo	2005	Série A	29	2	10	1	3	1	—		—		—		42	4
Flamengo	2006	Série A	7	0	7	1	3	0	—		—		—		17	1
Flamengo	Total		36	2	17	2	6	1	—		—		—		59	5
Cruzeiro (loan)	2007	Série A	2	0	0	0	3	0	—		—		—		5	0
Nacional (loan)	2007–08	Primeira Liga	14	2	—		0	0	0	0	—		—		14	2
Portuguesa (loan)	2008	Série A	20	3	—		—		—		—		—		20	3
Portuguesa (loan)	2009	Série B	31	9	17	2	—		—		—		—		48	11
Portuguesa (loan)	Total		51	12	17	2	—		—		—		—		68	14
Kashima Antlers	2010	J. League Division 1	31	2	—		5	1	2	0	4	0	1	0	43	3
Kashima Antlers	2011	J. League Division 1	16	2	—		1	0	1	0	7	1	1	0	26	3
Kashima Antlers	Total		47	4	—		6	1	3	0	11	1	2	0	69	3
Botafogo	2012	Série A	32	3	11	5	3	0	—		1	0	—		47	8
Botafogo	2013	Série A	4	1	17	5	3	1	—		—		—		24	8
Botafogo	Total		36	4	28	10	6	1	—		1	0	—		71	16
Sharjah	2013–14	UAE Pro League	23	5	—		1	0	6	2	—		—		30	7
Palmeiras	2015	Série A	1	0	—		0	0	—		—		—		1	0
Vasco da Gama	2016	Série B	4	0	—		0	0	—		—		—		4	0
Boavista	2017	Carioca	—		8	1	2	0	—		—		—		10	1
Boavista	2018	Carioca	—		7	4	1	0	—		—		—		8	4
Boavista	Total		—		15	5	3	0	—		—		—		18	5
Career total			214	29	77	19	25	3	9	2	12	1	3	0	340	54

== Honours ==
Flamengo

- Brazilian Cup: 2006

Kashima Antlers

- Xerox Super Cup: 2010
- Emperor's Cup: 2010
- J. League Cup: 2011

Botafogo

- Campeonato Carioca: 2013

Palmeiras

- Brazilian Cup: 2015

Brazil U20

- Chile Octagonal Tournament: 2005 (U-20)
