= Masashi Motoyama =

Japanese footballer (born 1979)

Masashi Motoyama 本山 雅志
Personal information
- Full name: Masashi Motoyama
- Date of birth: June 20, 1979 (age 47)
- Place of birth: Kitakyushu, Fukuoka, Japan
- Height: 1.75 m (5 ft 9 in)
- Position: Midfielder

Youth career
- 1995–1997: Higashi Fukuoka High School

Senior career*
Years	Team	Apps	(Gls)
1998–2015	Kashima Antlers	365	(38)
2016–2019	Giravanz Kitakyushu	50	(0)
2021–2022	Kelantan United	23	(1)

International career
1999	Japan U-20	7	(1)
2000	Japan U-23	3	(0)
2000–2006	Japan	28	(0)
Medal record
Kashima Antlers
Winner	J1 League	1998
Winner	J1 League	2000
Winner	J1 League	2001
Winner	J1 League	2007
Winner	J1 League	2008
Winner	J1 League	2009
Winner	J.League Cup	2000
Winner	J.League Cup	2002
Winner	J.League Cup	2011
Winner	J.League Cup	2012
Winner	J.League Cup	2015
Runner-up	J.League Cup	1999
Runner-up	J.League Cup	2003
Runner-up	J.League Cup	2006
Winner	Emperor's Cup	2000
Winner	Emperor's Cup	2007
Winner	Emperor's Cup	2010
Runner-up	Emperor's Cup	2002
Representing Japan
AFC Asian Cup
Gold medal – first place	2004 China
FIFA U-20 World Cup
Silver medal – second place	1999 Nigeria
AFC U-19 Championship
Silver medal – second place	1998 Thailand
- * Club domestic league appearances and goals as of 31 December 2020

Masashi Motoyama (本山 雅志, Motoyama Masashi; born June 20, 1979) is a Japanese football player. He played for Japan national team.

== Club career ==
Motoyama was born in Kitakyushu on June 20, 1979. After graduating from high school, he joined J1 League club Kashima Antlers in 1998. He debuted in July 1998 and he played many matches from 1999 season. In 2000, Antlers won the champions all three major title in Japan; J1 League, J.League Cup and Emperor's Cup first time in J1 League history. The club also won the champions 2001 J1 League for 2 years in a row. In 2002, he was given the number "10" shirt as Bismarck successor. Antlers also won the champions in 2002 J.League Cup.

In 2007 season, he played all 34 matches and Antlers won the champions in J1 League for the first time in 6 years. Antlers also won the champions in 2007 Emperor's Cup. Antlers won the champions in J1 League for 3 years in a row (2007-2009).

From 2010 season, although his opportunity to play decreased, Antlers won the champions 2010 Emperor's Cup, 2011 and 2012 J.League Cup. In 2015, he could only play 6 matches and he left the club end of 2015 season.

In 2016, Motoyama moved to his local club Giravanz Kitakyushu in J2 League. He played many matches in 2016 season. However Giravanz was finished at the bottom place of 22 clubs and was relegated to J3 League. From 2017 season, he could not play many matches for injuries. At the end of 2019 season, he opted to retire after not appearing at all for Giravanz that year.

Motoyama came out of retirement when it was announced at the end of 2020 that he would play for Malaysia Premier League team Kelantan United, making this his first team outside of Japan.

== International career ==
In April 1999, Motoyama was selected Japan U-20 national team for 1999 World Youth Championship. At this tournament, he played all 7 matches as left side midfielder and Japan won the 2nd place.

On June 18, 2000, Motoyama debuted for Japan national team under manager Philippe Troussier against Bolivia.

In September 2000, Motoyama was selected Japan U-23 national team for 2000 Summer Olympics. He played 3 matches as substitute midfielder.

In September 2003, Motoyama played for Japan under manager Zico for the first time in 3 years. After that, he played many matches as substitute. In 2004, he was selected Japan for 2004 AFC Asian Cup. He played 4 matches and Japan won the champions. He was also member of Japan for 2005 FIFA Confederations Cup. He played 28 games for Japan until 2006.

== Career statistics ==
=== Club ===
As of 1 January 2020

Appearances and goals by club, season and competition
Club	Season	League			Emperor's Cup		J.League Cup		AFC		Total	
Club	Season	Division	Apps	Goals	Apps	Goals	Apps	Goals	Apps	Goals	Apps	Goals
Kashima Antlers	1998	J1 League	1	0	4	3	0	0	—		5	3
Kashima Antlers	1999	J1 League	18	0	0	0	2	0	—		20	0
Kashima Antlers	2000	J1 League	18	6	5	0	3	1	—		26	7
Kashima Antlers	2001	J1 League	21	3	3	2	3	0	—		27	5
Kashima Antlers	2002	J1 League	24	3	4	2	7	1	—		35	6
Kashima Antlers	2003	J1 League	20	4	4	1	4	1	1	0	29	6
Kashima Antlers	2004	J1 League	24	3	2	0	0	0	—		26	3
Kashima Antlers	2005	J1 League	32	5	3	1	0	0	—		35	6
Kashima Antlers	2006	J1 League	27	2	4	1	7	0	—		38	3
Kashima Antlers	2007	J1 League	34	2	5	1	9	4	—		48	7
Kashima Antlers	2008	J1 League	32	3	1	0	2	0	7	3	42	6
Kashima Antlers	2009	J1 League	27	2	3	0	2	0	6	1	38	3
Kashima Antlers	2010	J1 League	15	2	5	1	2	0	0	0	22	3
Kashima Antlers	2011	J1 League	13	0	3	0	1	0	3	0	20	0
Kashima Antlers	2012	J1 League	17	3	3	0	6	0	—		25	3
Kashima Antlers	2013	J1 League	24	0	2	0	7	1	—		34	1
Kashima Antlers	2014	J1 League	12	0	0	0	2	1	—		14	1
Kashima Antlers	2015	J1 League	6	0	2	0	0	0	4	0	12	0
Kashima Antlers	Total		365	38	53	12	57	9	21	4	496	63
Giravanz Kitakyushu	2016	J2 League	36	0	2	0	—		—		38	0
Giravanz Kitakyushu	2017	J3 League	5	0	0	0	—		—		5	0
Giravanz Kitakyushu	2018	J3 League	9	0	—		—		—		9	0
Giravanz Kitakyushu	2019	J3 League	0	0	0	0	—		—		0	0
Giravanz Kitakyushu	Total		50	0	2	0	—		—		52	0
Career total			415	38	55	12	57	9	21	4	548	63

=== International ===
Japan national team
Year	Apps	Goals
2000	3	0
2001	0	0
2002	0	0
2003	3	0
2004	12	0
2005	8	0
2006	2	0
Total	28	0

=== Appearances in major competitions ===
Team	Competition	Category	Appearances		Goals	Team Record
Team	Competition	Category	Start	Sub	Goals	Team Record
Japan	1999 FIFA World Youth Championship	U-20	7	0	1	2nd Place
Japan	2004 AFC Asian Cup	Senior	0	4	0	Champions

== Honours ==
Kashima Anthers

- J1 League - 1998, 2000, 2001, 2007, 2008, 2009
- Emperor's Cup - 2000, 2007
- J.League Cup - 2000, 2002
- Japanese Super Cup - 2009

Japan

- FIFA World Youth Championship - 1999 (Runner-up)
- AFC Asian Cup - 2004

Individual

- AFC U-19 Championship Top Scorer - 1998
- FIFA World Youth Championship Best Eleven - 1999
