= Takamitsu Yoshino =

Japanese footballer

Personal information
- Full name: Takamitsu Yoshino
- Date of birth: April 24, 1989 (age 37)
- Place of birth: Kyoto, Japan
- Height: 1.76 m (5 ft 9 1/2 in)
- Position: Midfielder

Team information
- Current team: Khonkaen
- Number: 7

Senior career*
Years	Team	Apps	(Gls)
2012–2015	Cerezo Osaka	24	(0)
2016	Ventforet Kofu		
2017–	Khonkaen	0	(0)
- * Club domestic league appearances and goals as of 23 February 2016

Takamitsu Yoshino (吉野 峻光, born April 24, 1989) is a Japanese football player.

== Club statistics ==
Updated to 23 February 2016.

Club performance			League		Cup		League Cup		Continental		Total	
Season	Club	League	Apps	Goals	Apps	Goals	Apps	Goals	Apps	Goals	Apps	Goals
Japan			League		Emperor's Cup		League Cup		Asia		Total	
2012	Cerezo Osaka	J1 League	5	0	2	0	4	0	-		11	0
2013	Cerezo Osaka	J1 League	0	0	0	0	0	0	-		0	0
2014	Cerezo Osaka	J1 League	2	0	2	0	2	0	0	0	6	0
2015	Cerezo Osaka	J2 League	17	0	1	0	-		-		18	0
Career total			24	0	5	0	6	0	0	0	35	0
