= Chikashi Masuda =

Japanese footballer

Personal information
- Full name: Chikashi Masuda
- Date of birth: 19 June 1985 (age 41)
- Place of birth: Miyazaki, Miyazaki, Japan
- Height: 1.79 m (5 ft 10 1/2 in)
- Position: Midfielder

Youth career
- 2001–2003: Hosho High School

Senior career*
| Years | Team | Apps | (Gls) |
| 2004–2012 | Kashima Antlers | 155 | (12) |
| 2010 | → Montedio Yamagata (loan) | 26 | (1) |
| 2013–2016 | Ulsan Hyundai | 98 | (7) |
| 2014 | → Omiya Ardija (loan) | 19 | (1) |
| 2017 | Al-Sharjah | 11 | (1) |
| 2017–2019 | Shimizu S-Pulse | 4 | (1) |
| 2019 | → Seoul E-Land (loan) | 12 | (0) |
| Total | | 325 | (23) |

International career
| 2006–2007 | Japan U23 | | |
| 2012 | Japan | 1 | (0) |
Medal record
Kashima Antlers
| Winner | J1 League | 2007 |
| Winner | J1 League | 2008 |
| Winner | J1 League | 2009 |
| Winner | J.League Cup | 2011 |
| Winner | J.League Cup | 2012 |
| Runner-up | J.League Cup | 2006 |
| Winner | Emperor's Cup | 2007 |
- * Club domestic league appearances and goals

Chikashi Masuda (増田 誓志, Masuda Chikashi; born 19 June 1985) is a Japanese former professional football player. He was capped by the Japan national team.

== Club career ==
In 2019, Masuda joined the K League 2 side Seoul E-Land on loan from Shimizu S-Pulse. He announced his retirement in November of the same year.

== International career ==
Masuda made his senior national team debut on 24 February 2012 in a friendly match against Iceland.

== Career statistics ==
Appearances and goals by club, season and competition
| Club | Season | League | | | Cup | | League Cup | | Continental | | Total | |
| Club | Season | Division | Apps | Goals | Apps | Goals | Apps | Goals | Apps | Goals | Apps | Goals |
|---|---|---|---|---|---|---|---|---|---|---|---|---|
| Kashima Antlers | 2004 | J. League Division 1 | 8 | 2 | 2 | 0 | 5 | 0 | — | | 15 | 2 |
| Kashima Antlers | 2005 | J. League Division 1 | 19 | 2 | 3 | 3 | 6 | 1 | — | | 28 | 6 |
| Kashima Antlers | 2006 | J. League Division 1 | 23 | 0 | 1 | 0 | 11 | 2 | — | | 35 | 2 |
| Kashima Antlers | 2007 | J. League Division 1 | 23 | 3 | 0 | 0 | 6 | 1 | — | | 29 | 4 |
| Kashima Antlers | 2008 | J. League Division 1 | 19 | 0 | 2 | 1 | 2 | 0 | 4 | 0 | 27 | 2 |
| Kashima Antlers | 2009 | J. League Division 1 | 17 | 0 | 3 | 0 | 0 | 0 | 5 | 0 | 25 | 0 |
| Kashima Antlers | 2011 | J. League Division 1 | 32 | 5 | 3 | 0 | 1 | 0 | — | | 36 | 5 |
| Kashima Antlers | 2012 | J. League Division 1 | 14 | 0 | 3 | 1 | 8 | 0 | — | | 25 | 1 |
| Kashima Antlers | Total | | 155 | 12 | 17 | 5 | 39 | 4 | 9 | 0 | 220 | 21 |
| Montedio Yamagata (loan) | 2010 | J. League Division 1 | 26 | 1 | 4 | 2 | 5 | 1 | — | | 35 | 4 |
| Ulsan Hyundai | 2013 | K League Classic | 35 | 4 | 1 | 0 | — | | — | | 36 | 4 |
| Ulsan Hyundai | 2014 | K League Classic | 0 | 0 | — | | — | | 2 | 0 | 2 | 0 |
| Ulsan Hyundai | 2015 | K League Classic | 31 | 3 | 2 | 0 | — | | — | | 33 | 3 |
| Ulsan Hyundai | 2016 | K League Classic | 32 | 0 | 2 | 0 | — | | — | | 34 | 0 |
| Ulsan Hyundai | Total | | 98 | 7 | 5 | 0 | — | | 4 | 0 | 107 | 7 |
| Omiya Ardija (loan) | 2014 | J. League Division 1 | 19 | 1 | 2 | 0 | 2 | 0 | — | | 23 | 1 |
| Sharjah FC | 2016–17 | UAE Pro-League | 11 | 1 | 0 | 0 | — | | — | | 11 | 1 |
| Shimizu S-Pulse | 2017 | J1 League | 4 | 1 | 0 | 0 | — | | — | | 4 | 1 |
| Shimizu S-Pulse | 2018 | J1 League | 0 | 0 | 0 | 0 | 5 | 0 | — | | 5 | 0 |
| Shimizu S-Pulse | Total | | 4 | 1 | 0 | 0 | 5 | 0 | — | | 9 | 1 |
| Seoul E-Land (loan) | 2019 | K League 2 | 12 | 0 | 2 | 0 | — | | — | | 14 | 0 |
| Career total | | | 325 | 23 | 30 | 7 | 51 | 5 | 11 | 0 | 417 | 35 |

== National team statistics ==
Japan national team
| Year | Apps | Goals |
|---|---|---|
| 2012 | 1 | 0 |
| Total | 1 | 0 |
