= Daichi Kawashima =

Japanese footballer

Daichi Kawashima 川島 大地
Personal information
- Full name: Daichi Kawashima
- Date of birth: November 21, 1986 (age 39)
- Place of birth: Kashima, Ibaraki, Japan
- Height: 1.68 m (5 ft 6 in)
- Position: Midfielder

Team information
- Current team: Giravanz Kitakyushu
- Number: 19

Youth career
- 2005–2008: Tokai University

Senior career*
Years	Team	Apps	(Gls)
2009–2013	Kashima Antlers	0	(0)
2011–2012	→ Montedio Yamagata (loan)	15	(0)
2014–	Giravanz Kitakyushu	83	(5)
Medal record
Kashima Antlers
Winner	J1 League	2009
Winner	Emperor's Cup	2010
- * Club domestic league appearances and goals as of 23 February 2018

Daichi Kawashima (川島 大地, Kawashima Daichi; born November 21, 1986) is a Japanese football player.

== Career statistics ==
Updated to 23 February 2018.

Appearances and goals by club, season and competition
Club	Season	League			Emperor's Cup		J.League Cup		Asia		Total	
Club	Season	Division	Apps	Goals	Apps	Goals	Apps	Goals	Apps	Goals	Apps	Goals
Kashima Antlers	2009	J1 League	0	0	0	0	0	0	0	0	0	0
Kashima Antlers	2010	J1 League	0	0	0	0	0	0	0	0	0	0
Montedio Yamagata	2011	J1 League	13	0	0	0	2	1	—		15	1
Montedio Yamagata	2012	J2 League	2	0	0	0	—		—		2	0
Kashima Antlers	2013	J2 League	0	0	0	0	0	0	—		0	0
Giravanz Kitakyushu	2014	J2 League	4	1	0	0	—		—		4	1
Giravanz Kitakyushu	2015	J2 League	34	2	2	0	—		—		36	2
Giravanz Kitakyushu	2016	J2 League	30	1	2	0	—		—		32	1
Giravanz Kitakyushu	2017	J3 League	15	1	2	0	—		—		17	1
Career total			98	5	6	0	2	1	0	0	106	6
