= Takefumi Toma =

Japanese retired footballer (born 1989)

Takefumi Toma 當間 建文
Personal information
- Full name: Takefumi Toma
- Date of birth: 21 March 1989 (age 37)
- Place of birth: Okinawa, Japan
- Height: 1.78 m (5 ft 10 in)
- Position: Centre back

Youth career
- 2004–2006: Tokai University Daigo High School

Senior career*
Years	Team	Apps	(Gls)
2007–2011	Kashima Antlers	3	(0)
2012–2013	Tochigi SC	59	(3)
2014–2015	Montedio Yamagata	49	(3)
2016–2019	Matsumoto Yamaga	55	(3)
2019	→ FC Gifu (loan)	14	(1)

International career
2010	Japan U-23		
Medal record
Kashima Antlers
Winner	J1 League	2007
Winner	J1 League	2008
Winner	J1 League	2009
Winner	J.League Cup	2011
Winner	Emperor's Cup	2007
Winner	Emperor's Cup	2010
Montedio Yamagata
Runner-up	Emperor's Cup	2014
Representing Japan
Asian Games
Gold medal – first place	2010 Guangzhou	Team
- * Club domestic league appearances and goals

Takefumi Toma (當間 建文, Toma Takefumi; born 21 March 1989 in Okinawa) is a Japanese retired football player.

== Japan U-21 ==
Toma was selected for the Japan Under-21 squad for the 2010 Asian Games held in Guangzhou, China PR.

== Career statistics ==
Updated to 24 February 2019.

Appearances and goals by club, season and competition
Club	Season	League			Emperor's Cup		J.League Cup		Total	
Club	Season	Division	Apps	Goals	Apps	Goals	Apps	Goals	Apps	Goals
Kashima Antlers	2007	J1 League	0	0	0	0	0	0	0	0
Kashima Antlers	2008	J1 League	0	0	0	0	0	0	0	0
Kashima Antlers	2009	J1 League	0	0	0	0	0	0	0	0
Kashima Antlers	2010	J1 League	1	0	3	0	0	0	4	0
Kashima Antlers	2011	J1 League	2	0	1	0	0	0	3	0
Tochigi SC	2012	J2 League	29	2	1	0	—		30	2
Tochigi SC	2013	J2 League	30	1	0	0	—		30	1
Montedio Yamagata	2014	J2 League	27	3	5	0	—		32	3
Montedio Yamagata	2015	J1 League	22	0	2	0	2	2	26	2
Matsumoto Yamaga	2016	J2 League	25	1	2	0	—		27	1
Matsumoto Yamaga	2017	J2 League	20	1	1	0	—		21	1
Matsumoto Yamaga	2018	J2 League	5	0	2	2	—		7	2
Career total			161	8	17	2	2	2	180	12
