= 2009 Japanese Super Cup =

Kashima Antlers	Gamba Osaka
3	0
- Date: February 28, 2009
- Venue: National Stadium, Tokyo
- Attendance: 36,880

2009 Japanese Super Cup was the Japanese Super Cup competition. The match was played at National Stadium in Tokyo on February 28, 2009. Kashima Antlers won the championship.

== Match details ==
February 28, 2009

Kashima Antlers	3–0	Gamba Osaka

National Stadium
Attendance: 36,880
