= Kenji Koyano =

Japanese footballer

Personal information
- Full name: Kenji Koyano
- Date of birth: June 22, 1988 (age 38)
- Place of birth: Itako, Ibaraki, Japan
- Height: 1.70 m (5 ft 7 in)
- Position: Midfielder

Youth career
- 1995–2006: Kashima Antlers

Senior career*
Years	Team	Apps	(Gls)
2007–2011	Kashima Antlers	4	(0)
2012–2013	Albirex Niigata	10	(0)
2014–2015	Mito HollyHock	28	(1)
2016–	Gainare Tottori	0	(0)
Medal record
Kashima Antlers
Winner	J1 League	2007
Winner	J1 League	2008
Winner	J1 League	2009
Winner	J.League Cup	2011
Winner	Emperor's Cup	2007
Winner	Emperor's Cup	2010
- * Club domestic league appearances and goals as of 23 February 2016

Kenji Koyano (小谷野 顕治, born June 22, 1988) is a Japanese football player.

== Club career statistics ==
Updated to 23 February 2016.

Club performance			League		Cup		League Cup		Continental		Total	
Season	Club	League	Apps	Goals	Apps	Goals	Apps	Goals	Apps	Goals	Apps	Goals
Japan			League		Emperor's Cup		J. League Cup		Asia		Total	
2007	Kashima Antlers	J1 League	0	0	0	0	0	0	-		0	0
2008	Kashima Antlers	J1 League	0	0	0	0	0	0	0	0	0	0
2009	Kashima Antlers	J1 League	0	0	0	0	0	0	0	0	0	0
2010	Kashima Antlers	J1 League	1	0	1	0	0	0	1	0	3	0
2011	Kashima Antlers	J1 League	3	0	1	0	0	0	1	0	5	0
2012	Albirex Niigata	J1 League	9	0	2	0	4	0	-		15	0
2013	Albirex Niigata	J1 League	1	0	0	0	0	0	-		1	0
2014	Mito Hollyhock	J2 League	17	0	2	1	-		-		19	1
2015	Mito Hollyhock	J2 League	11	1	2	0	-		-		13	1
Total			42	1	8	1	4	0	2	0	56	2
