= Yuji Funayama (footballer) =

Japanese footballer

Yuji Funayama 船山 祐二
Personal information
- Full name: Yuji Funayama
- Date of birth: 19 January 1985 (age 41)
- Place of birth: Narita, Chiba, Japan
- Height: 1.76 m (5 ft 9 in)
- Position: Midfielder

Youth career
- 1991–1999: Kashiwa Reysol
- 2000: Narashino High School
- 2001–2002: RKU Kashiwa High School

College career
Years	Team	Apps	(Gls)
2003–2006	Ryutsu Keizai University		

Senior career*
Years	Team	Apps	(Gls)
2007–2010	Kashima Antlers	10	(1)
2009	→ Cerezo Osaka (loan)	15	(5)
2011–2012	Montedio Yamagata	48	(2)
2013	Avispa Fukuoka	37	(1)
2014	Army United	28	(1)
2015	Air Force Central	33	(0)
2016	Tokyo Verdy	16	(0)
Medal record
Kashima Antlers
Winner	J1 League	2007
Winner	J1 League	2008
Winner	J1 League	2009
Winner	Emperor's Cup	2007
Winner	Emperor's Cup	2010
- * Club domestic league appearances and goals as of 28 December 2016, 15:38 (UTC)

Yuji Funayama (船山 祐二, Funayama Yūji; born 19 January 1985 in Narita, Chiba) is a Japanese former footballer who played as a midfielder.

== Career ==
Funayama announcement officially retirement from football in 2016.

== Personal life ==
His younger brother Takayuki also plays football and currently play in JFL club, ReinMeer Aomori.

== Career statistics ==
=== Club ===
As of the end of 2016 season.

Club performance			League		Cup		League Cup		Continental		Total	
Season	Club	League	Apps	Goals	Apps	Goals	Apps	Goals	Apps	Goals	Apps	Goals
Japan			League		Emperor's Cup		J. League Cup		Asia		Total	
2005	Ryutsu Keizai University	Football League	0	0	–						0	0
2006	Ryutsu Keizai University	Football League	9	2	1	0	–				10	2
2007	Kashima Antlers	J. League 1	8	1	0	0	2	0	–		10	1
2008	Kashima Antlers	J. League 1	2	0	0	0	0	0	0	0	2	0
2009	Kashima Antlers	J. League 1	0	0	0	0	0	0	0	0	0	0
2009	Cerezo Osaka (loan)	J. League 2	15	5	1	0	–				16	5
2010	Kashima Antlers	J. League 1	0	0	1	0	1	0	0	0	2	0
2011	Montedio Yamagata	J. League 1	19	0	2	0	1	0	0	0	22	0
2012	Montedio Yamagata	J. League 2	27	2	0	0	–				27	2
2013	Avispa Fukuoka	J. League 2	37	1	1	0	–				38	1
2014	Army United	Thai Premier League	28	1	0	0	–				28	1
2015	Air Force Central	Thai First Division	32	0	0	0	–				32	0
2016	Tokyo Verdy	J2 League	16	0	1	0	–				16	5
Total			193	12	6	0	4	0	0	0	203	12

== Honours ==
=== Club ===
Kashima Antlers

- J. League Division 1 Champions (2) : 2008, 2007
