= Shuto Suzuki =

Japanese footballer

Personal information
- Full name: Shuto Suzuki
- Date of birth: August 31, 1985 (age 41)
- Place of birth: Chiba, Japan
- Height: 1.71 m (5 ft 7 1/2 in)
- Position: Midfielder

Youth career
- 2004–2007: Waseda University

Senior career*
Years	Team	Apps	(Gls)
2008–2010	Kashima Antlers	0	(0)
2009	→Shonan Bellmare (loan)	6	(0)
2011–2012	Tochigi SC	19	(0)
2013–2014	Giravanz Kitakyushu	37	(1)
Total		62	(1)
Medal record
Kashima Antlers
Winner	J1 League	2008
Winner	J1 League	2009
Winner	Emperor's Cup	2010
- * Club domestic league appearances and goals

Shuto Suzuki (鈴木 修人, Suzuki Shūto; born August 31, 1985) is a former Japanese football player.

In February 2015, Suzuki announced his retirement from football.
