= Shinichiro Kawamata =

Japanese footballer

Shinichiro Kawamata 川俣慎一郎
Personal information
- Full name: Shinichiro Kawamata
- Date of birth: 23 July 1989 (age 37)
- Place of birth: Gotemba, Shizuoka, Japan
- Height: 1.88 m (6 ft 2 in)
- Position: Goalkeeper

Team information
- Current team: Nankatsu SC
- Number: 22

Youth career
- –2004: Harasato Sports Shonendan
- 2002–2004: Kashima Antlers
- 2005–2007: Azul Claro Numazu

Senior career*
Years	Team	Apps	(Gls)
2008–2019	Kashima Antlers	0	(0)
2011	→ Vegalta Sendai (loan)	0	(0)
2020–	Nankatsu SC	0	(0)
Medal record
Kashima Antlers
Winner	AFC Champions League	2018
Winner	J1 League	2008
Winner	J1 League	2009
Winner	J1 League	2016
Runner-up	J1 League	2017
Winner	J.League Cup	2012
Winner	J.League Cup	2015
Winner	Emperor's Cup	2010
Winner	Emperor's Cup	2016
- * Club domestic league appearances and goals as of 14 October 2022

Shinichiro Kawamata (川俣慎一郎, Kawamata, Shinichiro; born 23 July 1989 in Gotemba, Shizuoka) is a Japanese footballer who plays for Nankatsu SC.

== Career ==
Shinichiro Kawamata joined J1 League club; Kashima Antlers in 2008. In 2011, he moved Vegalta Sendai. In 2012, he backed to Kashima Antlers. 25 May 2016, he debuted in J.League Cup (v Júbilo Iwata).

In January 2020, Kawamata joined Nankatsu SC.

== Club statistics ==
Updated to end of 2018 season.

Club performance			League		Cup		League Cup		Continental		Total	
Season	Club	League	Apps	Goals	Apps	Goals	Apps	Goals	Apps	Goals	Apps	Goals
Japan			League		Emperor's Cup		J.League Cup		AFC		Total	
2008	Kashima Antlers	J1 League	0	0	0	0	0	0	0	0	0	0
2008	Kashima Antlers	J1 League	0	0	0	0	0	0	0	0	0	0
2010	Kashima Antlers	J1 League	0	0	0	0	0	0	0	0	0	0
2011	Vegalta Sendai	J1 League	0	0	0	0	0	0	–		0	0
2012	Kashima Antlers	J1 League	0	0	0	0	0	0	–		0	0
2013	Kashima Antlers	J1 League	0	0	0	0	0	0	–		0	0
2014	Kashima Antlers	J1 League	0	0	0	0	0	0	–		0	0
2015	Kashima Antlers	J1 League	0	0	0	0	0	0	0	0	0	0
2016	Kashima Antlers	J1 League	0	0	0	0	1	0	–		1	0
2017	Kashima Antlers	J1 League	0	0	0	0	0	0	0	0	0	0
2018	Kashima Antlers	J1 League	0	0	0	0	0	0	0	0	0	0
Career total			0	0	0	0	1	0	0	0	1	0
