= Ryuta Sasaki =

Japanese footballer

Personal information
- Full name: Ryuta Sasaki
- Date of birth: February 7, 1988 (age 38)
- Place of birth: Kashima, Ibaraki, Japan
- Height: 1.80 m (5 ft 11 in)
- Position: Forward

Youth career
- 2003–2005: Kashima Gakuen High School

Senior career*
Years	Team	Apps	(Gls)
2006–2012	Kashima Antlers	41	(4)
2006	→Japan Soccer College (loan)	0	(0)
2011	→Shonan Bellmare (loan)	31	(3)
2012	Tochigi SC	15	(0)
Total		87	(7)
Medal record
Kashima Antlers
Winner	J1 League	2007
Winner	J1 League	2008
Winner	J1 League	2009
Winner	J.League Cup	2012
Runner-up	J.League Cup	2006
Winner	Emperor's Cup	2007
Winner	Emperor's Cup	2010
- * Club domestic league appearances and goals

Ryuta Sasaki (佐々木 竜太, Sasaki Ryuta; born February 7, 1988) is a former Japanese football player.

== Club statistics ==
Club performance			League		Cup		League Cup		Continental		Total	
Season	Club	League	Apps	Goals	Apps	Goals	Apps	Goals	Apps	Goals	Apps	Goals
Japan			League		Emperor's Cup		J.League Cup		Asia		Total	
2006	Kashima Antlers	J1 League	0	0	0	0	0	0	-		0	0
2006	Japan Soccer College	Regional Leagues	0	0	0	0	-		-		0	0
2007	Kashima Antlers	J1 League	8	1	0	0	3	0	-		11	1
2008	Kashima Antlers	J1 League	11	2	1	0	0	0	6	1	18	3
2009	Kashima Antlers	J1 League	4	1	1	0	0	0	3	2	8	3
2010	Kashima Antlers	J1 League										
Country	Japan		23	4	2	0	3	0	9	3	37	7
Total			23	4	2	0	3	0	9	3	37	7

== Team honors ==
- J1 League - 2007, 2008, 2009
