= Yasushi Endo =

Japanese footballer

Yasushi Endo 遠藤 康
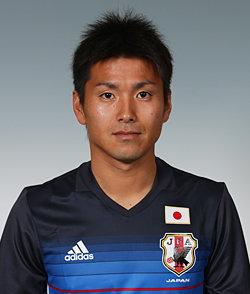

Personal information
- Full name: Yasushi Endo
- Date of birth: 7 April 1988 (age 38)
- Place of birth: Sendai, Miyagi, Japan
- Height: 1.68 m (5 ft 6 in)
- Position: Attacking midfielder

Youth career
- 2001–2006: Shiogama FC

Senior career*
| Years | Team | Apps | (Gls) |
| 2007–2022 | Kashima Antlers | 304 | (46) |
| 2022–2024 | Vegalta Sendai | 32 | (5) |
Medal record
Kashima Antlers
| Winner | AFC Champions League | 2018 |
| Winner | J1 League | 2007 |
| Winner | J1 League | 2008 |
| Winner | J1 League | 2009 |
| Winner | J1 League | 2016 |
| Runner-up | J1 League | 2017 |
| Winner | J.League Cup | 2011 |
| Winner | J.League Cup | 2012 |
| Winner | J.League Cup | 2015 |
| Winner | Emperor's Cup | 2007 |
| Winner | Emperor's Cup | 2010 |
| Winner | Emperor's Cup | 2016 |
- * Club domestic league appearances and goals as of 25 October 2022 ‡ National team caps and goals as of 7 May 2015

Yasushi Endo (遠藤 康, Endō Yasushi; born 7 April 1988 in Sendai, Miyagi) is a former Japanese footballer.

== Career statistics ==
As of match played on 25 October 2022.

Appearances and goals by club, season and competition
| Club | Season | League | | | Cup | | League Cup | | Other | | Total | |
| Club | Season | Division | Apps | Goals | Apps | Goals | Apps | Goals | Apps | Goals | Apps | Goals |
|---|---|---|---|---|---|---|---|---|---|---|---|---|
| Kashima Antlers | 2007 | J1 League | 2 | 0 | - | | 3 | 0 | - | | 2 | 0 |
| Kashima Antlers | 2008 | J1 League | - | | - | | - | | 1 (Note: Appearances in AFC Champions League) | 0 | 1 | 0 |
| Kashima Antlers | 2009 | J1 League | 2 | 0 | 1 | 0 | 0 | 0 | 0 | 0 | 2 | 0 |
| Kashima Antlers | 2010 | J1 League | 19 | 2 | 3 | 1 | 1 | 0 | 7 (Note: Six appearances in AFC Champions League, One appearance in Japanese Super Cup) | 2 | 27 | 4 |
| Kashima Antlers | 2011 | J1 League | 30 | 3 | 1 | 0 | 3 | 0 | 5 | 0 | 38 | 3 |
| Kashima Antlers | 2012 | J1 League | 32 | 6 | 5 | 3 | 10 | 2 | 1 | 0 | 44 | 8 |
| Kashima Antlers | 2013 | J1 League | 28 | 7 | 3 | 2 | 7 | 0 | 1 | 0 | 36 | 7 |
| Kashima Antlers | 2014 | J1 League | 30 | 10 | 1 | 0 | 5 | 1 | 0 | 0 | 35 | 11 |
| Kashima Antlers | 2015 | J1 League | 32 | 6 | 1 | 0 | 5 | 2 | 6 | 1 | 43 | 9 |
| Kashima Antlers | 2016 | J1 League | 25 | 3 | 4 | 0 | 3 | 1 | 7 (Note: Appearances in FIFA Club World Cup) | 2 | 39 | 6 |
| Kashima Antlers | 2017 | J1 League | 22 | 2 | 2 | 0 | 2 | 0 | 7 (Note: Six appearances in AFC Champions League, One appearance in Japanese Super Cup) | 3 | 32 | 5 |
| Kashima Antlers | 2018 | J1 League | 20 | 4 | 5 | 1 | 4 | 0 | 10 (Note: Appearances in FIFA Club World Cup) | 1 | 39 | 6 |
| Kashima Antlers | 2019 | J1 League | 12 | 1 | 3 | 0 | 2 | 0 | 8 | 0 | 25 | 1 |
| Kashima Antlers | 2020 | J1 League | 27 | 1 | 0 | 0 | 1 | 0 | - | | 28 | 1 |
| Kashima Antlers | 2021 | J1 League | 23 | 1 | 3 | 2 | 9 | 0 | - | | 35 | 3 |
| Vegalta Sendai | 2022 | J2 League | 32 | 5 | 1 | 0 | - | | - | | 33 | 5 |
| Career totals | | | 336 | 51 | 33 | 9 | 55 | 6 | 53 | 9 | 377 | 75 |

== International career ==
On 7 May 2015, Japan's coach Vahid Halilhodžić called him for a two-days training camp.

== Honours ==
=== Club ===
Kashima Antlers

- J. League Division 1 (4) : 2007, 2008, 2009, 2016
- Emperor's Cup (3) : 2007, 2010, 2016
- J. League Cup (3) : 2011, 2012, 2015
- Japanese Super Cup (3) : 2009, 2010, 2017
- Suruga Bank Championship (2) : 2012, 2013
- AFC Champions League (1): 2018
