= Kenta Kasai =

Japanese footballer

Personal information
- Full name: Kenta Kasai
- Date of birth: 25 December 1985 (age 40)
- Place of birth: Kikugawa, Shizuoka, Japan
- Height: 1.77 m (5 ft 9 1/2 in)
- Position: Defender

Youth career
- 2003: Santos
- 2004: Paulista

Senior career*
Years	Team	Apps	(Gls)
2005–2007	Paulista	2	(0)
2008–2010	Kashima Antlers	0	(0)
Total		2	(0)
Medal record
Kashima Antlers
Winner	J1 League	2008
Winner	J1 League	2009
Winner	Emperor's Cup	2010
- * Club domestic league appearances and goals

Kenta Kasai (笠井 健太, Kasai Kenta; born 25 December 1985) is a former Japanese football player.

== Club statistics ==
Club performance			League		Cup		League Cup		Continental		Total	
Season	Club	League	Apps	Goals	Apps	Goals	Apps	Goals	Apps	Goals	Apps	Goals
Brazil			League		Copa do Brasil		League Cup		South America		Total	
2005	Paulista	Série B	0	0					-		0	0
2006	Paulista	Série B	2	0					1	0	3	0
2007	Paulista	Série B	0	0					-		0	0
Japan			League		Emperor's Cup		League Cup		Asia		Total	
2008	Kashima Antlers	J1 League	0	0	0	0	0	0	2	0	2	0
2009	Kashima Antlers	J1 League	0	0	0	0	0	0	0	0	0	0
2010	Kashima Antlers	J1 League										
Career total			2	0	0	0	0	0	3	0	5	0
