= Yūzō Tashiro =

Japanese footballer

Yuzo Tashiro 田代 有三
Personal information
- Full name: Yuzo Tashiro
- Date of birth: July 22, 1982 (age 44)
- Place of birth: Fukuoka, Fukuoka, Japan
- Height: 1.81 m (5 ft 11 1/2 in)
- Position: Forward

Youth career
- 1998–2000: Fukuoka University Ohori High School

College career
Years	Team	Apps	(Gls)
2001–2004	Fukuoka University		

Senior career*
Years	Team	Apps	(Gls)
2003	Oita Trinita	1	(0)
2004	Sagan Tosu	10	(1)
2005–2011	Kashima Antlers	114	(31)
2010	→Montedio Yamagata (loan)	29	(10)
2012–2014	Vissel Kobe	66	(15)
2015–2016	Cerezo Osaka	28	(8)
2016	→Cerezo Osaka U-23 (loan)	1	(0)
2017–2018	Wollongong Wolves	41	(14)
Total		290	(79)

International career
2008	Japan	3	(0)
Medal record
Kashima Antlers
Winner	J1 League	2007
Winner	J1 League	2008
Winner	J1 League	2009
Winner	J.League Cup	2011
Runner-up	J.League Cup	2006
Winner	Emperor's Cup	2007
- * Club domestic league appearances and goals

Yuzo Tashiro (田代 有三, Tashiro Yūzō; born July 22, 1982) is a former Japanese football player. He played for Japan national team.

== Playing career ==
He was educated at and played for Fukuoka University Ohori High School and Fukuoka University. When he was at the university, he was a member of the Japan team that won the 22nd Universiade football competition hosted by Daegu, South Korea.

He was chosen as one of the Designated Players for Development by J1 League and JFA in 2003 and 2004. Because of this status, he was able to register as an Oita Trinita player (2003) and a Sagan Tosu player (2004) while he was still eligible to play for his university club. He played one game for Oita and 10 games for Tosu.

After the graduation in 2005, he joined Kasima Antlers. He became a regular in the 2006 season for the club. He earned his first international cap on February 17, 2008 against in an East Asian Cup match against China. After being released by Vissel Kobe in the end of 2014 season, he signed in March 2015 with Cerezo Osaka.

== Club statistics ==
Club performance			League		Cup		League Cup		Continental		Total	
Season	Club	League	Apps	Goals	Apps	Goals	Apps	Goals	Apps	Goals	Apps	Goals
Japan			League		Emperor's Cup		J.League Cup		Asia		Total	
2003	Oita Trinita	J1 League	1	0	0	0	0	0	-		1	0
2004	Sagan Tosu	J2 League	10	1	0	0	-		-		10	1
2005	Kashima Antlers	J1 League	5	1	0	0	4	0	-		9	1
2006	Kashima Antlers	J1 League	20	7	4	2	8	2	-		32	11
2007	Kashima Antlers	J1 League	24	6	5	2	5	4	-		34	12
2008	Kashima Antlers	J1 League	27	3	2	0	1	0	8	5	38	8
2009	Kashima Antlers	J1 League	16	2	2	1	2	0	3	0	23	3
2010	Montedio Yamagata	J1 League	29	10	0	0	6	3	-	-	35	13
2011	Kashima Antlers	J1 League	22	11	1	1	3	1	3	1	29	15
2012	Vissel Kobe	J1 League	18	6	1	0	1	0	-	-	20	6
2013	Vissel Kobe	J2 League	35	8	1	0	-	-	-	-	36	8
2014	Vissel Kobe	J1 League	13	1	-	-	7	0	-		20	1
2015	Cerezo Osaka	J2 League	22	6	0	0	-		-		22	6
2016	Cerezo Osaka	J2 League										
2017	Wollongong Wolves	NPL NSW	21	10	–	–	–	–	–	–	21	10
2018	Wollongong Wolves	NPL NSW	20	4	–	–	–	–	–	–	20	4
Japan total			242	62	16	6	37	10	14	6	309	84
Australia total			61	14	–	–	–	–	–	–	61	14
Career total			303	76	16	6	37	10	14	6	370	98

== National team statistics ==
Japan national team
Year	Apps	Goals
2008	3	0
Total	3	0

== Team honors ==
- J1 League - 2007, 2008, 2009
- Emperor's Cup - 2007
- Japanese Super Cup - 2009
