= 2011 J.League Cup =

2011 J. League Cup
Yamazaki Nabisco Cup

Tournament details
- Country: Japan
- Teams: 18

Final positions
- Champions: Kashima Antlers (4th title)
- Runners-up: Urawa Red Diamonds
- Semifinalists: Nagoya Grampus; Cerezo Osaka

Tournament statistics
- Matches played: 27

The 2011 J. League Cup, also known as the 2011 J.League Yamazaki Nabisco Cup for sponsoring purposes, was the 36th edition of the most prestigious Japanese soccer league cup tournament and the 19th edition under the current J. League Cup format. It was scheduled to begin on 16 March 2011 with the first matches of the group stage; however, the competition was postponed due to the aftermath of the 2011 Tōhoku earthquake and tsunami. Later the beginning of the tournament is set to 5 June, with reducing the number of matches.

The winner qualified for the 2012 Suruga Bank Championship.

== Format ==
All 18 teams from the 2011 J. League Division 1 will take part in the tournament. Nagoya Grampus, Gamba Osaka, Cerezo Osaka and Kashima Antlers are given a bye to the quarter-final due to the qualification for the AFC Champions League group stage. The remaining 4 teams for quarter-finals are selected from other 14 teams by knockout tournaments of home and away (with away goals rule, except for goals in extra times). Quarter-finals and semifinals will be played as one match at either team's home stadium. The final will also be played as one match, but at neutral venue (National Stadium).

First, the exact date of the Final has yet to be determined and is subject to possible participation in the 2011 AFC Champions League Final of at least one of the involved clubs. Later the date is set to 29 October.

=== Original Format ===
The original competition format, which is same as the previous tournament and was abandoned due to 2011 Tōhoku earthquake and tsunami, is:

- The preliminary round for the 14 teams would be played as 2 groups of single round-robin tournaments by 7 teams, where each team would play 3 home and 3 away games. The top 2 teams in each group would advance to quarter-finals.
- Quarter-finals and semi-finals would be played home and away.

The draw result of the preliminary round is:

Group A
Albirex Niigata, Omiya Ardija, Yokohama F. Marinos, Kawasaki Frontale, Montedio Yamagata, Kashiwa Reysol, Ventforet Kofu
Group B
Avispa Fukuoka, Júbilo Iwata, Urawa Red Diamonds, Sanfrecce Hiroshima, Shimizu S-Pulse, Vegalta Sendai, Vissel Kobe

== Schedule ==
=== First round ===
The first leg is scheduled on 5 June and the second leg on 27 July.

Albirex Niigata and Omiya Ardija received bye for the second round as a result of tournament draws.

Team 1	Agg.	Team 2	1st leg	2nd leg
Urawa Red Diamonds	4–1	Montedio Yamagata	2–0	2 – 1
Kashiwa Reysol	1–3	Vegalta Sendai	0–1	1 – 2
Júbilo Iwata	5–0	Avispa Fukuoka	2–0	3 – 0
Ventforet Kofu	1–2	Shimizu S-Pulse	1–0	0 – 2
Yokohama F. Marinos	3–2	Vissel Kobe	1–1	2 – 1
Sanfrecce Hiroshima	3–5	Kawasaki Frontale	2–2	1 – 3

=== Second round ===
The first leg is scheduled on 14 September and the second leg on 28 September.

Team 1	Agg.	Team 2	1st leg	2nd leg
Urawa Red Diamonds	4–1	Omiya Ardija	2–0	2 – 1
Vegalta Sendai	0–3	Júbilo Iwata	0–0	0 – 3
Shimizu S-Pulse	3–4	Albirex Niigata	2–1	1 – 3
Yokohama F. Marinos	6–3	Kawasaki Frontale	4–0	2 – 3

=== Quarterfinals ===
5 October 2011
19:00

Kashima Antlers	3–2 (a.e.t.)	Yokohama F. Marinos
Koroki 49'; Osako 73'; Tashiro 111'		Nakata 1' (o.g.); Watanabe 11'

Kashima Soccer Stadium, Kashima
Attendance: 4,804
Referee: Masaaki Iemoto

5 October 2011
19:00

Nagoya Grampus	5–3 (a.e.t.)	Albirex Niigata
Kanazaki 15'; Nagai 90+1', 105+2'; Hashimoto 114'; Tulio 120+1'		Bruno Lopes 63'; Kawamata 90+3'; Kikuchi 98'

Mizuho Athletic Stadium, Nagoya
Attendance: 4,108
Referee: Ryuji Sato

5 October 2011
19:03

Gamba Osaka	3–1	Júbilo Iwata
Sasaki 43'; Rafinha 67'; 76' (o.g.)		Nasu 7'

Expo'70 Stadium, Suita, Osaka
Attendance: 4,112
Referee: Nobutsugu Murakami

5 October 2011
19:04

Cerezo Osaka	1–2	Urawa Red Diamonds
Fabio Lopes 73'		9' (o.g.); Despotović 83'

Nagai Stadium, Osaka
Attendance: 6,736
Referee: Toshimitsu Yoshida

=== Semifinals ===
9 October 2011
13:00

Nagoya Grampus	1–2 (a.e.t.)	Kashima Antlers
Tulio 80'		Osako 10'; Shibasaki 107'

Mizuho Athletic Stadium, Nagoya
Attendance: 8,562
Referee: Kenji Ogiya

9 October 2011
17:00

Urawa Red Diamonds	2–1	Gamba Osaka
Umesaki 21'; Escudero 38'		Otsuka 90+3'

Saitama Stadium, Saitama
Attendance: 23,879
Referee: Hajime Matsuo

=== Final ===
29 October 2011
13:10

Urawa Red Diamonds	0–1 (a.e.t.)	Kashima Antlers
	Report (in Japanese)	Osako 105'

Tokyo National Stadium, Tokyo
Attendance: 46,599
Referee: Minoru Tojo

== Top goalscorers ==
Goalscorers	Goals	Team
(Serbia) Ranko Despotović	4	Urawa Red Diamonds
(Japan) Yuya Osako	3	Kashima Antlers
(Japan) Masashi Oguro	3	Yokohama F. Marinos
