= 2022 Japanese Super Cup =

Kawasaki Frontale	Urawa Red Diamonds
0	2
- Date: 12 February 2022
- Venue: Nissan Stadium, Yokohama
- Referee: Hiroki Kasahara
- Attendance: 18,558
- Weather: Fine; 8.5 °C (47.3 °F); 40% humidity

The 2022 Japanese Super Cup (known as FUJIFILM Super Cup 2022 for sponsorship reasons) was the 29th Japanese Super Cup since its reestablishment, and the 37th overall. It was held on 12 February 2022 between the 2021 J1 League champions Kawasaki Frontale, whom also the Super Cup holders, and the 2021 Emperor's Cup winners Urawa Red Diamonds at the Nissan Stadium, Yokohama, Kanagawa.

This was Frontale's fourth Super Cup appearance overall, all in the previous five years; they only failed to qualify in 2020 and won twice in 2019 and 2021. At the other hand, this was Urawa's tenth Super Cup appearance and their first since 2019; they previously had won four times (in 1979, 1980, 1983, and 2006).

Ataru Esaka scored in each half to won Urawa their fifth Super Cup ever, second as Urawa Red Diamonds, and the first in 16 years. Frontale lost the Super Cup match for the first time since their maiden appearance in 2018.

== Details ==
12 February 2022
13:35 JST

Kawasaki Frontale	0–2	Urawa Red Diamonds
	JLeague.co (EN); JLeague.jp (JA)	Esaka 7', 81'

Nissan Stadium, Yokohama
Attendance: 18,558
Referee: Hiroki Kasahara

Kawasaki Frontale	Urawa Red Diamonds

GK	1	(South Korea) Jung Sung-ryong
RB	13	(Japan) Miki Yamane
CB	5	(Japan) Shogo Taniguchi (c)
CB	7	(Japan) Shintaro Kurumaya
LB	2	(Japan) Kyohei Noborizato
DM	6	(Brazil) João Schmidt	(substituted off) 46'
CM	14	(Japan) Yasuto Wakizaka	(substituted off) 71'
CM	10	(Japan) Ryota Oshima	(substituted off) 82'
RW	41	(Japan) Akihiro Ienaga
LW	18	(Thailand) Chanathip Songkrasin	(substituted off) 77'
CF	9	(Brazil) Leandro Damião	(substituted off) 71'
Substitutes:
GK	27	(Japan) Kenta Tanno
MF	3	(Japan) Koki Tsukagawa	(substituted on) 82'
MF	16	(Japan) Tatsuki Seko	(substituted on) 71'
MF	31	(Japan) Kazuya Yamamura
FW	11	(Japan) Yu Kobayashi	(substituted on) 77'
FW	20	(Japan) Kei Chinen	(substituted on) 71'
FW	23	(Brazil) Marcinho	(substituted on) 46'
Manager:
(Japan) Toru Oniki

GK	1	(Japan) Shusaku Nishikawa (c)
RB	2	(Japan) Hiroki Sakai
CB	4	(Japan) Takuya Iwanami
CB	28	(Denmark) Alexander Scholz
LB	6	(Japan) Kazuaki Mawatari
DM	19	(Japan) Ken Iwao
RM	14	(Japan) Takahiro Sekine	(substituted off) 86'
CM	22	(Japan) Kai Shibato
CM	3	(Japan) Atsuki Ito	(substituted off) 82'
LM	15	(Japan) Takahiro Akimoto	(substituted off) 82'
CF	33	(Japan) Ataru Esaka	(substituted off) 86'
Substitutes:
GK	12	(Japan) Zion Suzuki
DF	13	(Japan) Tomoya Inukai	(substituted on) 86'
DF	20	(Japan) Tetsuya Chinen
DF	24	(Japan) Yuta Miyamoto	(substituted on) 86'
MF	25	(Japan) Kaito Yasui
MF	40	(Japan) Yuichi Hirano	(substituted on) 82'
FW	27	(Japan) Kai Matsuzaki	(substituted on) 82'
Manager:
(Spain) Ricardo Rodríguez

Assistant referees:
Isao Nishihashi
Kentaro Matsui
Fourth official:
Masuya Ueda
Video assistant referee:
Yudai Yamamoto
Assistant video assistant referee:
Haruhiro Otsuka

Match rules

- 90 minutes.
- Penalty shoot-out if scores still level.
- Seven named substitutes.
- Maximum of five substitutions, and a maximum of two additional concussion substitutions.
