= Chinese football clubs in international competitions =

Chinese football clubs has participated in Asian association football competitions (AFC Champions League/Asian Club Championship and the Asian Cup Winners' Cup) and other international competitions (FIFA Club World Cup and A3 Champions Cup) since 1985, when the Asian Club Championship returned to Asia for the first time in 14 years.

Liaoning is the first club who won the Asian champion in 1990, and Guangzhou Evergrande is the most successful club with 2 AFC Champions League titles. Defunct club Dalian Shide also got a runners-up in 1997–98 Asian Club Championship.

== Qualification rules ==
Competition	Who qualifies	Notes
AFC Champions League group stage	Chinese Super League 1st	
AFC Champions League group stage	Chinese Super League 2nd	
AFC Champions League group stage	Chinese FA Cup winners	
AFC Champions League play-off round	Chinese Super League 3rd	If the Chinese FA Cup winners have already qualified for AFC Champions League by a high Super League finish, then the next highest-finishing Super League club gets this place.

== Multiple Asian and worldwide competition winners from China ==
Team	Number of Wins	Years
Guangzhou Evergrande	2	2013, 2015
Liaoning	1	1990

== Full Asian record ==
=== AFC Champions League/Asian Club Championship ===
Chinese teams have won the competition 3 times and reached the final on 2 other occasions.

Year	Team	Progress	Score	Opponents	Place(s)
1985-86	Liaoning	3rd in qualifying tournament	N/A	(Hong Kong) Seiko, (North Korea) April 25	
1986	Liaoning	3rd in final round	N/A	(Japan) Furukawa Electric, (Saudi Arabia) Al-Hilal, (Iraq) Al-Talaba	
1987	August 1st	4th in group stage	N/A	(Japan) Yomiuri FC, (Malaysia) Federal Territory, (Kuwait) Kazma	
1988-89	Guangdong	2rd in semi final league	N/A	(Iraq) Al-Rasheed, (Kuwait) Kazma, (India) Mohun Bagan	
1989-90	Liaoning	Winners	3–2	(Japan) Nissan Yokohama	2–1 in Yokohama, 1–1 in Shenyang
1989-90	Liaoning	Final	1–2	(Iran) Esteghlal	Dhaka
1991	Liaoning	First round	2–3	(North Korea) April 25	1–0 in Shenyang, 1–3 in Pyongyang
1992-93	Liaoning	Third round	4–4 (a)	(Japan) Yomiuri FC	3–3 in Chengdu, 1–1 in Tokyo
1993-94	Liaoning	Third place match	1–4	(Japan) Verdy Kawasaki	Bangkok
1994-95	Liaoning	3rd in quarter-finals	N/A	(South Korea) Ilhwa Chunma, (Thailand) Thai Farmers Bank, (Japan) Verdy Kawasaki	
1995	Withdrew (Dalian Wanda)				
1996-97	Shanghai Shenhua	First round	0–1	(South Korea) Cheonan Ilhwa Chunma	0–0 in Seongnam, 0–1 in Shanghai
1997-98	Dalian Wanda	Final	0–0 (5–6 p)	(South Korea) Pohang Steelers	Hong Kong
1998-99	Dalian Wanda	Third place match	2–3	(United Arab Emirates) Al-Ain	Tehran
1999-2000	Withdrew (Dalian Wanda)				
2000-01	Shandong Luneng	3rd in quarter-finals	N/A	(Japan) Júbilo Iwata, (South Korea) Suwon Samsung Bluewings, (Indonesia) PSM Makassar	
2001-02	Dalian Shide	3rd in quarter-finals	N/A	(South Korea) Suwon Samsung Bluewings, (South Korea) Anyang LG Cheetahs, (Japan) Kashima Antlers	
2002-03	Shanghai Shenhua	3rd in group stage	N/A	(Thailand) BEC Tero Sasana, (South Korea) Daejeon Citizen, (Japan) Kashima Antlers	
2002-03	Dalian Shide	Semi-finals	6–7	(United Arab Emirates) Al-Ain	2–4 in Al Ain, 4–3 in Dalian
2004	Shanghai Shenhua	3rd in group stage	N/A	(South Korea) Jeonbuk Hyundai Motors, (Japan) Jubilo Iwata, (Thailand) BEC Tero	
2004	Dalian Shide	Quarter-finals	1–2	(Saudi Arabia) Al-Ittihad	1–1 in Dalian, 0–1 in Jeddah
2005	Shandong Luneng	Quarter-finals	3–8	(Saudi Arabia) Al-Ittihad	1–1 in Jinan, 2–7 in Jeddah
2005	Shenzhen Jianlibao	Semi-finals	0–6	(United Arab Emirates) Al-Ain	0–6 in Al Ain, 0–0 in Shenzhen
2006	Dalian Shide	2nd in group stage	N/A	(South Korea) Jeonbuk Hyundai Motors, (Japan) Gamba Osaka, (Vietnam) Da Nang	
2006	Shanghai Shenhua	Quarter-finals	3–4	(South Korea) Jeonbuk Hyundai Motors	1–0 in Shanghai, 2–4 in Jeonju
2007	Shanghai Shenhua	4th in group stage	N/A	(Japan) Urawa Red Diamonds, (Australia) Sydney FC, (Indonesia) Persik Kediri	
2007	Shandong Luneng	2nd in group stage	N/A	(South Korea) Seongnam Ilhwa Chunma, (Australia) Adelaide United, (Vietnam) Gach Dong Tam Long An	
2008	Beijing Guoan	2nd in group stage	N/A	(Japan) Kashima Antlers, (Thailand) Krung Thai Bank, (Vietnam) Nam Định	
2008	Changchun Yatai	2nd in group stage	N/A	(Australia) Adelaide United, (South Korea) Pohang Steelers, (Vietnam) Bình Dương	
2009	Beijing Guoan	4th in group stage	N/A	(Japan) Nagoya Grampus, (Australia) Newcastle Jets, (South Korea) Ulsan Hyundai	
2009	Shandong Luneng	3rd in group stage	N/A	(Japan) Gamba Osaka, (South Korea) FC Seoul, (Indonesia) Sriwijaya	
2009	Shanghai Shenhua	3rd in group stage	N/A	(Japan) Kashima Antlers, (South Korea) Suwon Samsung Bluewings, Singapore Armed Forces	
2009	Tianjin Teda	3rd in group stage	N/A	(South Korea) Pohang Steelers, (Japan) Kawasaki Frontale, (Australia) Central Coast Mariners	
2010	Henan Jianye	4th in group stage	N/A	(South Korea) Suwon Samsung Bluewings, (Japan) Gamba Osaka, Singapore Armed Forces	
2010	Shandong Luneng	4th in group stage	N/A	(Australia) Adelaide United, (South Korea) Pohang Steelers, (Japan) Sanfrecce Hiroshima	
2010	Changchun Yatai	3rd in group stage	N/A	(Japan) Kashima Antlers, (South Korea) Jeonbuk Hyundai Motors, (Indonesia) Persipura Jayapura	
2010	Beijing Guoan	Round of 16	0–2	(South Korea) Suwon Samsung Bluewings	Suwon
2011	Shanghai Shenhua	4th in group stage	N/A	(South Korea) Suwon Samsung Bluewings, (Japan) Kashima Antlers, (Australia) Sydney FC	
2011	Hangzhou Greentown	4th in group stage	N/A	(South Korea) FC Seoul, (Japan) Nagoya Grampus, (United Arab Emirates) Al-Ain	
2011	Shandong Luneng	3rd in group stage	N/A	(South Korea) Jeonbuk Hyundai Motors, (Japan) Cerezo Osaka, (Indonesia) Arema	
2011	Tianjin Teda	Round of 16	0–3	(South Korea) Jeonbuk Hyundai Motors	Jeonju
2012	Liaoning Whowin	Play-off round	Withdrew		
2012	Shanghai Shenhua	4th in group stage	N/A	(South Korea) Seongnam Ilhwa Chunma, (Japan) Nagoya Grampus, (Australia) Central Coast Mariners	
2012	Beijing Guoan	4th in group stage	N/A	(South Korea) Ulsan Hyundai, (Japan) FC Tokyo, (Australia) Brisbane Roar	
2012	Guangzhou Evergrande	Quarter-finals	4–5	(Saudi Arabia) Al-Ittihad	2–4 in Jeddah, 2–1 in Guangzhou
2013	Jiangsu Sainty	3rd in group stage	N/A	(South Korea) FC Seoul, (Thailand) Buriram United, (Japan) Vegalta Sendai	
2013	Guizhou Renhe	3rd in group stage	N/A	(Japan) Kashiwa Reysol, (Australia) Central Coast Mariners, (South Korea) Suwon Samsung Bluewings	
2013	Beijing Guoan	Round of 16	1–3	(South Korea) FC Seoul	0–0 in Beijing, 1–3 in Seoul
2013	Guangzhou Evergrande	Winners	3–3 (a)	(South Korea) FC Seoul	2–2 in Seoul, 1–1 in Guangzhou
2014	Guizhou Renhe	4th in group stage	N/A	(Australia) Western Sydney Wanderers, (Japan) Kawasaki Frontale, (South Korea) Ulsan Hyundai	
2014	Shandong Luneng	4th in group stage	N/A	(South Korea) Pohang Steelers, (Japan) Cerezo Osaka, (Thailand) Buriram United	
2014	Beijing Guoan	3rd in group stage	N/A	(South Korea) FC Seoul, (Japan) Sanfrecce Hiroshima, (Australia) Central Coast Mariners	
2014	Guangzhou Evergrande	Quarter-finals	2–2 (a)	(Australia) Western Sydney Wanderers	0–1 in Sydney, 2–1 in Guangzhou
2015	Guangzhou R&F	4th in group stage	N/A	(Japan) Gamba Osaka, (South Korea) Seongnam FC, (Thailand) Buriram United	
2015	Shandong Luneng	3rd in group stage	N/A	(South Korea) Jeonbuk Hyundai Motors, (Vietnam) Becamex Bình Dương, (Japan) Kashiwa Reysol	
2015	Beijing Guoan	Round of 16	1–2	(South Korea) Jeonbuk Hyundai Motors	1–1 in Jeonju, 0–1 in Beijing
2015	Guangzhou Evergrande	Winners	1–0	(United Arab Emirates) Al-Ahli	0–0 in Dubai, 1–0 in Guangzhou
2016	Guangzhou Evergrande	3rd in group stage	N/A	(Australia) Sydney FC, (Japan) Urawa Red Diamonds, (South Korea) Pohang Steelers	
2016	Jiangsu Suning	3rd in group stage	N/A	(South Korea) Jeonbuk Hyundai Motors, (Vietnam) Becamex Binh Duong, (Japan) FC Tokyo	
2016	Shanghai SIPG	Quarter-finals	0–5	(South Korea) Jeonbuk Hyundai Motors	0–0 in Shanghai, 0–5 in Jeonju
2016	Shandong Luneng	Quarter-finals	2–4	(South Korea) FC Seoul	1–3 in Seoul, 1–1 in Jinan
2017	Shanghai Shenhua	Play-off round	0–2	(Australia) Brisbane Roar	Shanghai
2017	Jiangsu Suning	Round of 16	3–5	(China) Shanghai SIPG	1–2 in Shanghai, 2–3 in Nanjing
2017	Guangzhou Evergrande	Quarter-finals	5–5 (4–5 p)	(China) Shanghai SIPG	0–4 in Shanghai, 5–1 in Guangzhou
2017	Shanghai SIPG	Semi-finals	1–2	(Japan) Urawa Red Diamonds	1–1 in Shanghai, 0–1 in Saitama
2018	Shanghai Shenhua	4th in group stage	N/A	(Australia) Sydney FC, (Japan) Kashima Antlers, (South Korea) Suwon Samsung Bluewings	
2018	Guangzhou Evergrande	Round of 16	2–2 (a)	(China) Tianjin Quanjian	0–0 in Tianjin, 2–2 in Guangzhou
2018	Shanghai SIPG	Round of 16	3–4	(Japan) Kashima Antlers	1–3 in Kashima, 2–1 in Shanghai
2018	Tianjin Quanjian	Quarter-finals	0–5	(Japan) Kashima Antlers	0–2 in Kashima, 0–3 in Macau
2019	Beijing FC	3rd in group stage	N/A	(South Korea) Jeonbuk Hyundai Motors, (Japan) Urawa Red Diamonds, (Thailand) Buriram United	
2019	Shandong Luneng	Round of 16	4–4 (5–6 p)	(China) Guangzhou Evergrande	1–2 in Guangzhou, 3–2 in Jinan
2019	Shanghai SIPG	Quarter-finals	3–3 (a)	(Japan) Urawa Red Diamonds	2–2 in Shanghai, 1–1 in Saitama
2019	Guangzhou Evergrande	Semi-finals	0–3	(Japan) Urawa Red Diamonds	0–2 in Saitama, 0–1 in Guangzhou
2020	Guangzhou Evergrande				
2020	Shanghai Shenhua				
2020	Beijing FC				
2020	Shanghai SIPG				

=== Asian Cup Winners' Cup ===
The Asian Cup Winners' Cup was an association football competition run by the Asian Football Confederation (AFC). The competition was started in 1991 as a tournament for all the domestic cup winners from countries affiliated to the AFC. The winners of the Cup Winners Cup used to contest the Asian Super Cup against the winners of the Asian Champions' Cup. The most successful clubs in the competition are Al Hilal from Saudi Arabia and Nissan FC from Japan. In 2002, it merged with the Asian Clubs Championship to form the AFC Champions League.

Chinese team Dalian Shide reached the final in the season of 2000-01.

Year	Team	Progress	Score	Opponents	Place(s)
1990-91	Dalian	Second round	Withdrew		
1991-92	None entered				
1992-93	None entered				
1993-94	Dalian	First round	1–2	(Hong Kong) South China	0–2 in Hong Kong, 1–0 in Shanghai
1994-95	None entered				
1995	None entered				
1996-97	None entered				
1997-98	Beijing Guoan	Third place match	4–1	(Turkmenistan) Köpetdag Aşgabat	Riyadh
1998-99	Beijing Guoan	Second round	0–4	(South Korea) Chunnam Dragons	0–2 in Beijing, 0–2 in Gwangyang
1999-2000	Shanghai Shenhua	Second round	0–2	(Japan) Shimizu S-Pulse	0–0 in Shanghai, 0–2 in Shizuoka
2000-01	Dalian Shide	Final	2–4	(Saudi Arabia) Al-Shabab	Jeddah
2001-02	Chongqing Lifan	Third place match	0–0 (6–7 p)	(Qatar) Al-Sadd	Doha

=== A3 Champions Cup ===
A3 Champions Cup (also known as East Asian Champions Cup) was an annual football (soccer) tournament jointly organized by the China PR, Japan and Korea Republic football Association. It began in 2003, involving the league champions of China, Japan and South Korea. The host nation also invited an additional team, making this a four team tournament.

Chinese team Shanghai Shenhua won the competition in 2007.

Year	Team	Progress	Opponents	Place(s)
2003	Dalian Shide	Runners-up	(Japan) Kashima Antlers, (South Korea) Seongnam Ilhwa Chunma, (Japan) Júbilo Iwata	Tokyo
2004	Inter Shanghai	4th place	(South Korea) Seongnam Ilhwa Chunma, (Japan) Yokohama F. Marinos	Shanghai
2004	Shanghai Shenhua	3rd place	(South Korea) Seongnam Ilhwa Chunma, (Japan) Yokohama F. Marinos	Shanghai
2005	Shenzhen Jianlibao	4th place	(South Korea) Suwon Samsung Bluewings, (South Korea) Pohang Steelers, (Japan) Yokohama F. Marinos	Jeju
2006	Dalian Shide	4th place	(South Korea) Ulsan Hyundai, (Japan) Gamba Osaka, (Japan) JEF United Chiba	Tokyo
2007	Shandong Luneng	Runners-up	(Japan) Urawa Red Diamonds, (South Korea) Seongnam Ilhwa Chunma	Jinan
2007	Shanghai Shenhua	Winners	(Japan) Urawa Red Diamonds, (South Korea) Seongnam Ilhwa Chunma	Jinan

== Full international record ==
=== FIFA Club World Cup ===
Chinese team Guangzhou Evergrande has won 2 AFC Champions League titles in 2013 and 2015, which made them qualifying to the FIFA Club World Cup as the representative of Asian clubs. In the 2013 FIFA Club World Cup, they entered in the quarterfinals, beating the African champions Al Ahly 2–0. In the semi-finals, they were defeated by the European champions Bayern Munich 3–0. In the third place match, the club lost against South American champions Atlético Mineiro 3–2 and finished in fourth place. In the 2015 FIFA Club World Cup, Guangzhou won 2–1 against Club América in the quarterfinals before losing 3–0 against Barcelona in the semi-finals. At the end, Guangzhou lost the third place match 2–1 against Hiroshima Sanfrecce, ending up in the same position as in the 2013 edition.

Year	Team	Progress	Score	Opponents	Place(s)
2013	Guangzhou Evergrande	Third place match	2–3	(Brazil) Atlético Mineiro	Marrakesh
2015	Guangzhou Evergrande	Third place match	1–2	(Japan) Sanfrecce Hiroshima	Yokohama
