= 1981 Japanese Super Cup =

Yanmar Diesel	Mitsubishi Motors
0	0
- Date: April 5, 1981
- Venue: National Stadium, Tokyo

1981 Japanese Super Cup was the Japanese Super Cup competition. The match was played at National Stadium in Tokyo on April 5, 1981. Yanmar Diesel won the championship.

== Match details ==
April 5, 1981

Yanmar Diesel	0–0	Mitsubishi Motors
Penalties
	3–2

National Stadium
