= 1982 Japanese Super Cup =

Fujita Industries	Nippon Kokan
2	0
- Date: March 28, 1982
- Venue: National Stadium, Tokyo

1982 Japanese Super Cup was the Japanese Super Cup competition. The match was played at National Stadium in Tokyo on March 28, 1982. Fujita Industries won the championship.

== Match details ==
March 28, 1982

Fujita Industries	2–0	Nippon Kokan

National Stadium
