= 1978 Japanese Super Cup =

Fujita Industries	Yanmar Diesel
5	1
- Date: April 2, 1978
- Venue: Osaka Nagai Stadium, Osaka

1978 Japanese Super Cup was the Japanese Super Cup competition. The match was played at Osaka Nagai Stadium in Osaka on April 2, 1978. Fujita Industries won the championship.

== Match details ==
April 2, 1978

Fujita Industries	5–1	Yanmar Diesel

Osaka Nagai Stadium
