= 1998 Japanese Super Cup =

Júbilo Iwata	Kashima Antlers
1	2
- Date: March 14, 1998
- Venue: National Stadium, Tokyo
- Attendance: 35,208

1998 Japanese Super Cup was the Japanese Super Cup competition. The match was played at National Stadium in Tokyo on March 14, 1998. Kashima Antlers won the championship.

== Match details ==
March 14, 1998

Júbilo Iwata	1–2	Kashima Antlers

National Stadium
Attendance: 35,208
