= 1997 Japanese Super Cup =

Kashima Antlers	Verdy Kawasaki
3	2
- Date: March 5, 1997
- Venue: National Stadium, Tokyo
- Attendance: 28,920

1997 Japanese Super Cup was the Japanese Super Cup competition. The match was played at National Stadium in Tokyo on March 5, 1997. Kashima Antlers won the championship.

== Match details ==
March 5, 1997

Kashima Antlers	3–2	Verdy Kawasaki

National Stadium
Attendance: 28,920
