= Japanese Super Cup =

- Founded: 1977 (original); 1994 (reestablishment)
- Region: Japan
- Teams: 2
- Current champions: Sanfrecce Hiroshima (5th title)
- Most championships: Kashima Antlers (6 titles)
- Website: www.jleague.jp/fxsc/
- 2026 Japanese Super Cup

The Japanese Super Cup (Japanese: スーパーカップ, Hepburn: Sūpā Kappu), a.k.a. the Fujifilm Super Cup (Japanese: 富士フイルム スーパーカップ, Hepburn: Fuji Fuirumu Sūpā Kappu) for sponsorship reasons, is an annual one-match association football competition in Japan organised by J.League and the Japan Football Association. This competition serves as the season opener and is played between the reigning J1 League champions and the Emperor's Cup winners. Fuji Xerox has sponsored the competition since its inception in 1994 (rebranded as Fujifilm Business Innovation from April 2021). The match is usually played annually every February.

== Participating clubs ==
Under the normal circumstances, the following clubs participate:

- Defending J1 League champions
- Defending Emperor's Cup winners

However, if the same club wins both the J1 League and the Emperor's Cup, the J1 League runners-up will participate. Up to 2009, the Emperor's Cup runners-up would take the honor.

== Competition format ==
- Two halves of 45-minute match.
- In case of a tie at the end of regulation time, penalties would decide the winners. No extra time would be played.

== Venues ==
- Tokyo National Stadium (1994–2004, 2006–2010, 2012–2014)
- International Stadium Yokohama (2005, 2011, 2015–2017, 2022)
- Saitama Stadium 2002 (2018–2021)
- Japan National Stadium (2023–present)

== Results ==
Year	Date	J.League Division 1/ J1 League champions	Score	Emperor's Cup winners	Venue
1994	5 March 1994	Verdy Kawasaki	2–1	Yokohama Flügels	National Stadium, Tokyo
1995	11 March 1995	Verdy Kawasaki	2–2 (4–2 p)	Bellmare Hiratsuka	National Stadium, Tokyo
1996	9 March 1996	Yokohama Marinos	0–2	Nagoya Grampus Eight	National Stadium, Tokyo
1997	5 March 1997	Kashima Antlers	3–2	Verdy Kawasaki	National Stadium, Tokyo
1998	14 March 1998	Júbilo Iwata	1–2	Kashima Antlers	National Stadium, Tokyo
1999	27 February 1999	Kashima Antlers	2–1	Shimizu S-Pulse^{*}	National Stadium, Tokyo
2000	4 March 2000	Júbilo Iwata	1–1 (3–2 p)	Nagoya Grampus Eight	National Stadium, Tokyo
2001	3 March 2001	Kashima Antlers	0–3	Shimizu S-Pulse^{†}	National Stadium, Tokyo
2002	23 February 2002	Kashima Antlers	1–1 (4–5 p)	Shimizu S-Pulse	National Stadium, Tokyo
2003	1 March 2003	Júbilo Iwata	3–0	Kyoto Purple Sanga	National Stadium, Tokyo
2004	6 March 2004	Yokohama F. Marinos	1–1 (2–4 p)	Júbilo Iwata	National Stadium, Tokyo
2005	26 February 2005	Yokohama F. Marinos	2–2 (4–5 p)	Tokyo Verdy 1969	International Stadium Yokohama, Yokohama
2006	25 February 2006	Gamba Osaka	1–3	Urawa Red Diamonds	National Stadium, Tokyo
2007	24 February 2007	Urawa Red Diamonds	0–4	Gamba Osaka^{†}	National Stadium, Tokyo
2008	1 March 2008	Kashima Antlers	2–2 (3–4 p)	Sanfrecce Hiroshima^{†}	National Stadium, Tokyo
2009	28 February 2009	Kashima Antlers	3–0	Gamba Osaka	National Stadium, Tokyo
2010	27 February 2010	Kashima Antlers	1–1 (5–3 p)	Gamba Osaka	National Stadium, Tokyo
2011	26 February 2011	Nagoya Grampus	1–1 (3–1 p)	Kashima Antlers	International Stadium Yokohama, Yokohama
2012	3 March 2012	Kashiwa Reysol	2–1	FC Tokyo	National Stadium, Tokyo
2013	23 February 2013	Sanfrecce Hiroshima	1–0	Kashiwa Reysol	National Stadium, Tokyo
2014	22 February 2014	Sanfrecce Hiroshima	2–0	Yokohama F. Marinos	National Stadium, Tokyo
2015	28 February 2015	Gamba Osaka	2–0	Urawa Red Diamonds^{‡}	International Stadium Yokohama, Yokohama
2016	20 February 2016	Sanfrecce Hiroshima	3–1	Gamba Osaka	International Stadium Yokohama, Yokohama
2017	18 February 2017	Kashima Antlers	3–2	Urawa Red Diamonds^{‡}	International Stadium Yokohama, Yokohama
2018	10 February 2018	Kawasaki Frontale	2–3	Cerezo Osaka	Saitama Stadium 2002, Saitama
2019	16 February 2019	Kawasaki Frontale	1–0	Urawa Red Diamonds	Saitama Stadium 2002, Saitama
2020	8 February 2020	Yokohama F. Marinos	3–3 (2–3 p)	Vissel Kobe	Saitama Stadium 2002, Saitama
2021	20 February 2021	Kawasaki Frontale	3–2	Gamba Osaka^{‡}	Saitama Stadium 2002, Saitama
2022	12 February 2022	Kawasaki Frontale	0–2	Urawa Red Diamonds	International Stadium Yokohama, Yokohama
2023	11 February 2023	Yokohama F. Marinos	2–1	Ventforet Kofu	National Stadium, Tokyo
2024	17 February 2024	Vissel Kobe	0–1	Kawasaki Frontale	National Stadium, Tokyo
2025	8 February 2025	Vissel Kobe	0–2	Sanfrecce Hiroshima^{‡}	National Stadium, Tokyo
2026	TBA 2026	Kashima Antlers	vs	Machida Zelvia	National Stadium, Tokyo

^{*} Since the 1998 Emperor's Cup winners Yokohama Flügels had been disbanded before the match, Shimizu S-Pulse as the runners-up qualified for the competition.
^{†} The same club won both the league and the cup; the cup's runners-up qualified for the competition.
^{‡} The same club won both the league and the cup; the league's runners-up qualified for the competition.

== Super Cup in JSL era ==
The Japanese Super Cup was also played during the Japan Soccer League (JSL) era from 1977 to 1984. However, it was never established as an independent competition as the second competition in 1978 was already served as a mere opening league match of the JSL. This previous Super Cup competition was taken less seriously than the current competition and made dormant after 8 years. All matches were held in the National Stadium in Tokyo except for the 1978 and 1980 matches, both held in Osaka.

Year	Date	JSL Division 1 champions	Score	Emperor's Cup winners	Venue
1977	10 April 1977	Furukawa Electric	3–2	Yanmar Diesel^{†}	National Stadium, Tokyo
1978	2 April 1978	Fujita Industries	5–1	Yanmar Diesel^{†}	Nagai Stadium, Osaka
1979	8 April 1979	Mitsubishi Motors	0–0 (3–1 p)	Toyo Industries^{†}	National Stadium, Tokyo
1980	6 April 1980	Fujita Industries	1–2	Mitsubishi Motors^{†}	Nagai Stadium, Osaka
1981	5 April 1981	Yanmar Diesel	0–0 (3–2 p)	Mitsubishi Motors	National Stadium, Tokyo
1982	28 March 1982	Fujita Industries	2–0	Nippon Kokan	National Stadium, Tokyo
1983	27 March 1983	Mitsubishi Motors	3–0	Yamaha Motors	National Stadium, Tokyo
1984	25 March 1984	Yomiuri FC	2–0	Nissan Motors	National Stadium, Tokyo

^{†} The same club had won both the JSL and the Emperor's Cup in the previous year; therefore, the runners-up of the Cup qualified for the competition.

== Performances ==
=== All-time ===
Years in italic indicate Japan Soccer League seasons.

Club	Winners	Runners-up	Winning years	Runners-up years
Kashima Antlers	6	4	1997, 1998, 1999, 2009, 2010, 2017	2001, 2002, 2008, 2011
Urawa Red Diamonds	5	5	1979, 1980, 1983, 2006, 2022	1981, 2007, 2015, 2017, 2019
Sanfrecce Hiroshima	5	1	2008, 2013, 2014, 2016, 2025	1979
Tokyo Verdy	4	1	1984, 1994, 1995, 2005	1997
Júbilo Iwata	3	2	2000, 2003, 2004	1983, 1998
Kawasaki Frontale	3	2	2019, 2021, 2024	2018, 2022
Gamba Osaka	2	5	2007, 2015	2006, 2009, 2010, 2016, 2021
Shonan Bellmare	2	2	1978, 1982	1980, 1995
Cerezo Osaka	2	2	1981, 2018	1977, 1978
Nagoya Grampus	2	1	1996, 2011	2000
Shimizu S-Pulse	2	1	2001, 2002	1999
Yokohama F. Marinos	1	6	2023	1984, 1996, 2004, 2005, 2014, 2020
Vissel Kobe	1	2	2020	2024, 2025
Kashiwa Reysol	1	1	2012	2013
JEF United Chiba	1	0	1977	
NKK SC	0	1		1982
Yokohama Flügels	0	1		1994
Kyoto Sanga	0	1		2003
FC Tokyo	0	1		2012
Ventforet Kofu	0	1		2023

=== J.League era (1994–present) ===
Club	Winners	Runners-up	Winning years	Runners-up years
Kashima Antlers	6	4	1997, 1998, 1999, 2009, 2010, 2017	2001, 2002, 2008, 2011
Sanfrecce Hiroshima	5	0	2008, 2013, 2014, 2016, 2025	
Kawasaki Frontale	3	2	2019, 2021, 2024	2018, 2022
Tokyo Verdy	3	1	1994, 1995, 2005	1997
Júbilo Iwata	3	1	2000, 2003, 2004	1998
Gamba Osaka	2	5	2007, 2015	2006, 2009, 2010, 2016, 2021
Urawa Red Diamonds	2	4	2006, 2022	2007, 2015, 2017, 2019
Nagoya Grampus	2	1	1996, 2011	2000
Shimizu S-Pulse	2	1	2001, 2002	1999
Yokohama F. Marinos	1	5	2023	1996, 2004, 2005, 2014, 2020
Kashiwa Reysol	1	1	2012	2013
Vissel Kobe	1	2	2020	2024, 2025
Cerezo Osaka	1	0	2018	
Yokohama Flügels	0	1		1994
Shonan Bellmare	0	1		1995
Kyoto Sanga	0	1		2003
FC Tokyo	0	1		2012
Ventforet Kofu	0	1		2023

== See also ==
- Football in Japan
- Japan Football Association (JFA)
- Japanese association football league system
- League system
- J.League
  - J1 League (I)
  - J2 League (II)
  - J3 League (III)
- Japan Football League (JFL) (IV)
- Japan Regional Football Champions League (promotion play-offs to JFL)
- Japanese Regional Leagues (V/VI)
- Emperor's Cup (national cup)
- J.League Cup (league cup)
