= 1999 Japanese Super Cup =

Kashima Antlers	Shimizu S-Pulse
2	1
- Date: February 27, 1999
- Venue: National Stadium, Tokyo
- Attendance: 28,520

1999 Japanese Super Cup was the Japanese Super Cup competition. The match was played at National Stadium in Tokyo on February 27, 1999. Kashima Antlers won the championship.

== Match details ==
February 27, 1999

Kashima Antlers	2–1	Shimizu S-Pulse

National Stadium
Attendance: 28,520
