= 1980 Japanese Super Cup =

Fujita Industries	Mitsubishi Motors
1	2
- Date: April 6, 1980
- Venue: Osaka Nagai Stadium, Osaka

1980 Japanese Super Cup was the Japanese Super Cup competition. The match was played at Osaka Nagai Stadium in Osaka on April 6, 1980. Mitsubishi Motors won the championship.

== Match details ==
April 6, 1980

Fujita Industries	1–2	Mitsubishi Motors

Osaka Nagai Stadium
