= 1979 Japanese Super Cup =

Mitsubishi Motors	Toyo Industries
0	0
- Date: April 8, 1979
- Venue: National Stadium, Tokyo

1979 Japanese Super Cup was the Japanese Super Cup competition. The match was played at National Stadium in Tokyo on April 8, 1979. Mitsubishi Motors won the championship.

== Match details ==
April 8, 1979

Mitsubishi Motors	0–0	Toyo Industries
Penalties
	3–1

National Stadium
