= 2003 A3 Champions Cup =

A3 Mazda Cup 2003

Tournament details
- Host country: Japan
- Dates: 16 – 22 February
- Teams: 4 (from 1 confederation)
- Venue: 1 (in 1 host city)

Final positions
- Champions: (Japan) Kashima Antlers (1st title)
- Runners-up: (China) Dalian Shide
- Third place: (South Korea) Seongnam Ilhwa
- Fourth place: (Japan) Jubilo Iwata

Tournament statistics
- Matches played: 6
- Goals scored: 14 (2.33 per match)
- Attendance: 127,245 (21,208 per match)
- Top scorer(s): (China) Hao Haidong (Dalian Shide, 3 goals)
- Best player(s): (Japan) Yutaka Akita (Kashima Antlers)

The 2003 A3 Champions Cup was first edition of A3 Champions Cup. It was held from February 16 to 22, 2003 in Tokyo, Japan.

== Participants ==
- (Japan) Jubilo Iwata – 2002 J. League Champions
- (Japan) Kashima Antlers – 2002 J. League Cup Winners
- (South Korea) Seongnam Ilhwa Chunma – 2002 K-League Champions
- (China) Dalian Shide – 2002 Chinese Jia-A League Champions

== Group table ==
Pos	Team	Pld	W	D	L	GF	GA	GD	Pts
1	(Japan) Kashima Antlers (C)	3	2	1	0	5	1	+4	7
2	(China) Dalian Shide	3	2	0	1	5	5	0	6
3	(South Korea) Seongnam Ilhwa Chunma	3	1	1	1	4	3	+1	4
4	(Japan) Júbilo Iwata	3	0	0	3	0	5	−5	0

Source: RSSSF
(C) Champions

=== Match Results ===
All times are Japan Standard Time (JST) – UTC+9

16 February 2003
13:00

Jubilo Iwata (Japan)	0 – 2	(South Korea) Seongnam Ilhwa Chunma
		Shin Tae-Yong 25'; Kim Dae-Eui 56'

Tokyo National Stadium, Tokyo
Attendance: 20,793

16 February 2003
17:00

Dalian Shide (China)	1 – 3	(Japan) Kashima Antlers
Wang Sheng 44'		Akita 29'; Ogasawara 38'; Fernando 53'

Tokyo National Stadium, Tokyo
Attendance: 23,907

19 February 2003
16:00

Seongnam Ilhwa Chunma (South Korea)	2 – 3	(China) Dalian Shide
Drakulić 16'; Shin Tae-Yong 53'		Hao Haidong 26', 44', 55'

Tokyo National Stadium, Tokyo
Attendance: 9,065

19 February 2003
19:00

Jubilo Iwata (Japan)	0 – 2	(Japan) Kashima Antlers
		Euller 8'; Yanagisawa 74'

Tokyo National Stadium, Tokyo
Attendance: 20,176

22 February 2003
13:30

Kashima Antlers (Japan)	0 – 0	(South Korea) Seongnam Ilhwa Chunma

Tokyo National Stadium, Tokyo
Attendance: 25,423

22 February 2003
16:30

Dalian Shide (China)	1 – 0	(Japan) Jubilo Iwata
Janković 8'

Tokyo National Stadium, Tokyo
Attendance: 27,881

== Awards ==
=== Winners ===
A3 Champions Cup 2003 Winners

Kashima Antlers
First title

=== Individual awards ===
Top Goalscorers	Most Valuable Player
(China) Hao Haidong (Dalian Shide)	(Japan) Yutaka Akita (Kashima Antlers)

== Goalscorers ==
Pos	Player	Team	Goals
1	(China) Hao Haidong	(China) Dalian Shide	3
2	(South Korea) Shin Tae-Yong	(South Korea) Seongnam Ilhwa Chunma	2
3	(Bulgaria) Zoran Janković	(China) Dalian Shide	1
3	(China) Wang Sheng	(China) Dalian Shide	1
3	(Japan) Yutaka Akita	(Japan) Kashima Antlers	1
3	(Brazil) Euller	(Japan) Kashima Antlers	1
3	(Brazil) Fernando	(Japan) Kashima Antlers	1
3	(Japan) Mitsuo Ogasawara	(Japan) Kashima Antlers	1
3	(Japan) Atsushi Yanagisawa	(Japan) Kashima Antlers	1
3	(Serbia and Montenegro) Saša Drakulić	(South Korea) Seongnam Ilhwa Chunma	1
3	(South Korea) Kim Dae-Eui	(South Korea) Seongnam Ilhwa Chunma	1
