= 2006 Japanese Super Cup =

2006 Xerox Super Cup
Gamba Osaka	Urawa Red Diamonds
1	3
- Urawa Red Diamonds won 3–1
- Date: 25 February 2006
- Venue: Tokyo National Stadium, Tokyo
- Referee: Yuichi Nishimura
- Attendance: 35,674

The 2006 Xerox Super Cup was held on 25 February 2006 between the 2005 J. League champions Gamba Osaka and the 2005 Emperor's Cup winner Urawa Red Diamonds. Urawa won the Trophy after winning the match 3–1.

== Match details ==
25 February 2006
13:37 JST

Gamba Osaka	1–3	Urawa Red Diamonds
Own-goal 2'	Report	9' Horinouchi; 17' Washington; 51' Ponte

Tokyo National Stadium
Attendance: 35,674
Referee: Yuichi Nishimura

== See also ==
- 2005 J. League Division 1
- 2005 Emperor's Cup
