= Shonan Bellmare =

Association football club in Hiratsuka, Japan

Shonan Bellmare 湘南ベルマーレ
- Full name: Shonan Bellmare
- Founded: 1968; 58 years ago as Towa Real Estate SC
- Stadium: Lemon Gas Stadium Hiratsuka; Hiratsuka, Kanagawa
- Capacity: 15,380
- Chairman: Kiyoshi Makabe
- Manager: Satoshi Yamaguchi
- League: J2 League
- 2025: J1 League, 19th of 20 (relegated)
- Website: www.bellmare.co.jp
Home colours	Away colours

Shonan Bellmare (湘南ベルマーレ, Shōnan Berumāre) is a Japanese professional football club based in Hiratsuka, in the west of Kanagawa Prefecture, part of the Greater Tokyo Area. The club will play in the J2 League, the second tier of football in the country as of the season 2026–27, after being relegated from J1 League, with three matches remaining. Their home stadium is Hiratsuka Athletics Stadium. Shonan refers to a coastal area along Sagami Bay that includes Hiratsuka. Bellmare is a portmanteau of the Italian words bello and mare, meaning "beautiful sea".

== History ==
=== Early years as corporate team (1968–1992) ===
The club was founded in 1968 as "Towa Real Estate SC" in Nasu, Tochigi. They were promoted to the Japan Soccer League (JSL) Division 1 in 1972. In 1975 they changed their name to "Fujita Kogyo SC" when Towa Estate Development gave up the ownership to their parent company Fujita Industries, which moved the club headquarters to Tokyo and their training ground to Hiratsuka one year later in 1976.

They won the JSL three times (including two doubles with the Emperor's Cup) between 1977 and 1981. They were nevertheless relegated to the JSL's Division 2 in 1990. Although they won the last JSL Division 2 season in 1991–92, the professionalization and formation of the J.League meant they did not meet the new top flight league's criteria and the runners-up, Kashima Antlers (formerly Sumitomo), were promoted instead.

=== 1993: JFL ===
In 1993, they adopted the new name "Bellmare Hiratsuka". Their application to the J.League Associate membership was accepted. They played in the former Japan Football League Division 1 and won the league championship. After Hiratsuka City Council committed to finance the refurbishment of the Hiratsuka Stadium to meet the J.League requirements, J.League accepted the club.

=== 1994–1997: Golden era ===
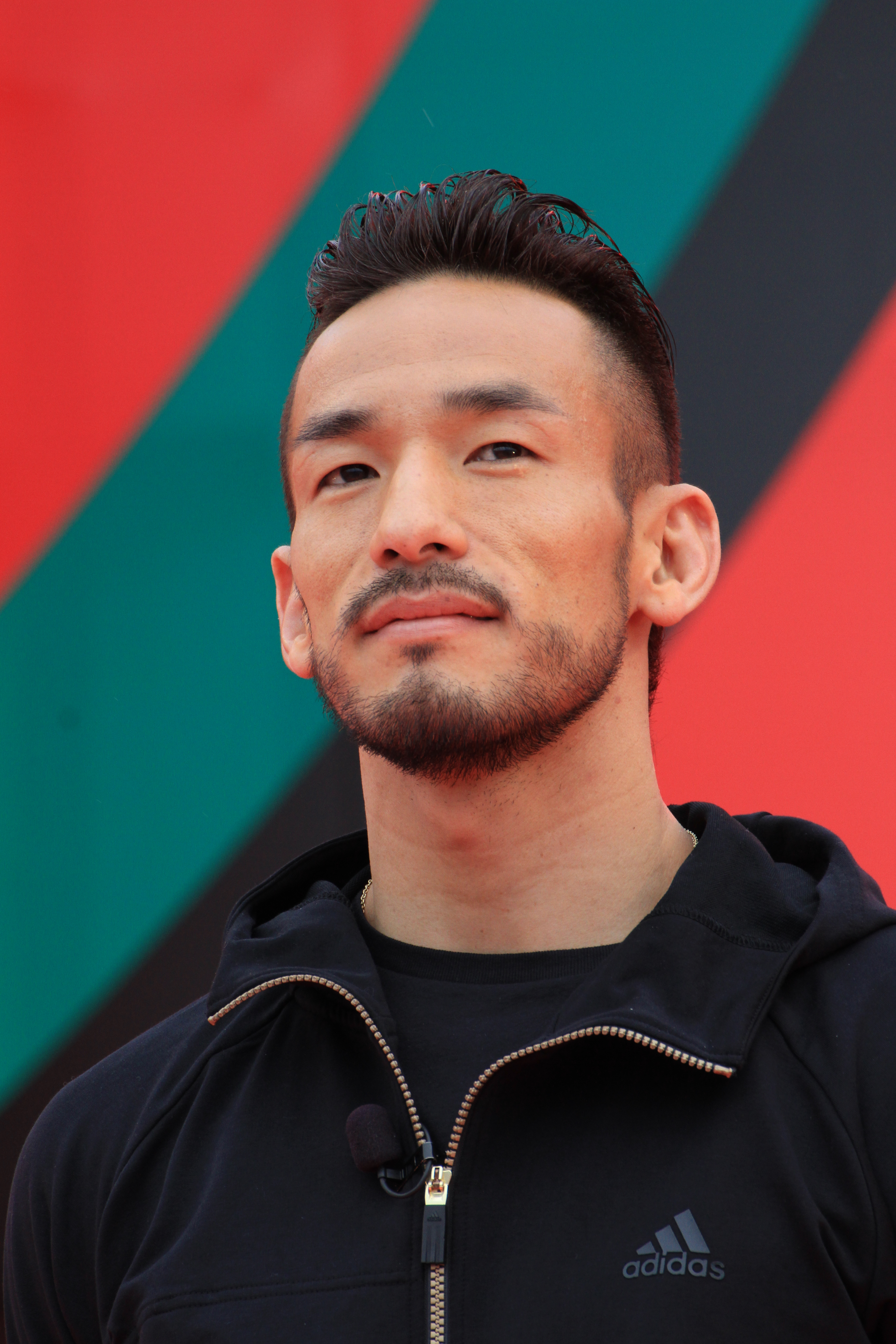
Hidetoshi Nakata, who won the Asian Cup Winners' Cup trophy in 1996

The club was forced to change their name to Bellmare Hiratsuka because J.League required the participants to designate only one city or town as their hometown and include its name in the club names at that time. The club initially struggled to cope with the J.League opponents and finished 11th out of 12 in the first stage of the 1994 season. However, they came back in the second stage and finished 2nd. With this momentum, the club won the 1994–1995 Emperor's Cup. This title qualified Bellmare for the 1995–96 Asian Cup Winners' Cup, which they won by beating Iraq's Al Talaba in the final. Hidetoshi Nakata joined the team in 1995 and they also successfully recruited Brazilian-born Wagner Lopes and influential Korean international Hong Myung-bo. This is arguably the most successful period of the club.

=== 1998–1999: Difficult period ===
Four Bellmare players were selected for the 1998 FIFA World Cup. They were Nakata, Lopes, Hong (for South Korea) and a goalkeeper Nobuyuki Kojima. However, as Nakata left for Italian club Perugia just after the World Cup, the club's fortune started to decline. The main sponsor Fujita decided to discontinue the financial support in 1999 due to their own financial difficulties. It forced the club to release some highly paid players including Lopes, Hong and Kojima. They finished bottom of J1 in 1999 and were relegated to J2.

=== 2000–2009: J2 League ===
The club made a new start. The ownership was transferred to a community-owned organisation. They also changed their name to Shonan Bellmare as J.League allowed them to enlarge their designated hometowns to include several cities and towns surrounding Hiratsuka. The club's performance on the pitch has not been strong and they have not been serious contenders for the promotion to J1 so far.

A J1 comeback in 2010, if they are able to achieve promotion, will be the first without Fujita as their sponsor. Although for a time they refused to consider their history as the championship-winning Fujita corporate team in their current history, this year they celebrated the club's 40-year anniversary in 2009 as deduced from the badge in their Web site.

On 5 December 2009, Shonan returned to J1 as third-place finishers in 2009 seasons.

=== 2010–2025: Return to J1 League ===
The club returned to the J1 in 2010, but injured one after another and J2 was relegated after leaving four games. In the end, he won 21 consecutive league games. It was the worst record of J1 at that time. After that, the team will be repeatedly demoted to J2 and promoted to J1.

In recent years, the team has been steadily improving. In 2014, the team made good progress in the J2, winning 14 consecutive games from the opening. The team was defeated by Ehime FC in the 15th round, but after that they lost 21 battles. J1 automatic promotion is confirmed. As a result, he won the J2 with 31 wins, 8 draws, 3 losses and 101 points in the 2014 season. In 2016, in the J1, Shonan Bellmare was the final result in 8th place, and it was the first time for J1 to remain in history. In addition, at the EAFF E-1 Football Championship 2015 held in August, Wataru Endo, who was on the team at the time, participated as a representative of Japan. In 2018, won the J.League Cup. It was the first time for Shonan Bellmare to win three major titles since winning the 74th Emperor's Cup in the Bellmare Hiratsuka.

On the operational side, there was some report that the club fell into excess debt of more than 100 million yen in February 2012, and in the worst case the club itself could be dissolved (the actual amount of excess debt was 82.68 million yen). However, the debt insolvency was resolved by two capital increases. In April 2018, SANEI ARCHITECTURE PLANNING, which was the largest shareholder of Shonan Bellmare, established "Merudia RIZAP Shonan Sports Partners" in collaboration with RIZAP GROUP. The new company acquired a 50% stake in Shonan Bellmare. RIZAP GROUP intends to invest 1 billion yen in Bellmare over the next three years.

== Rivalries ==
Historically the Shonan area was part of a pre-modern province, Sagami Province, whereas Yokohama and Kawasaki were part of Musashi Province, hence Bellmare's intraprefectural rivalries with Yokohama F. Marinos, Yokohama FC and Kawasaki Frontale are based on the hard-working port cities of South Musashi as opposed to the more laid-back attitude of Sagami.

== Affiliated clubs ==
The following clubs are currently affiliated with Shonan Bellmare:

- (Cambodia) Boeung Ket (2022–2026)
- (India) Sudeva Delhi (2022–2026)
- (Thailand) Nongbua Pitchaya (2022–2026)
- (China) Wuhan Three Towns (2022–2030)
- (Laos) FC Chanthabouly (2022–2028)
- (Malaysia) Kelantan Darul Naim (2022–2030)
- (Italy) Inter Milan (2024–2038)
- (Italy) SS Lazio (2024–2038)
- (Germany) Borussia Dortmund (2024–2038)

=== Former ===
- (Philippines) Davao Aguilas (2022–2024)
- (Indonesia) ASIOP (2022–2025)
- (England) Wolverhampton Wanderers (2024–2025)

== Players ==
=== First-team squad ===
As of 15 September 2026.

Note: Flags indicate national team as defined under FIFA eligibility rules; some limited exceptions apply. Players may hold more than one non-FIFA nationality.

No.	Pos.	Nation	Player
2	DF	JPN	Sere Matsumura
3	DF	JPN	Yūtarō Hakamata
4	DF	JPN	Kōki Tachi
5	MF	JPN	Hiroya Matsumoto
6	MF	JPN	Shōhei Takeda
7	MF	JPN	Kōsuke Onose
8	DF	JPN	Kazunari Ōno
9	FW	COL	Fabián González
11	FW	JPN	Yūtarō Oda
13	DF	JPN	Wakaba Shimoguchi
14	DF	JPN	Naoya Takahashi
15	DF	JPN	Kazuki Dohana
16	MF	BRA	Arthur Silva
17	MF	JPN	Soki Tamura
18	MF	JPN	Masaki Ikeda
19	FW	JPN	Taiyo Nishino
20	MF	JPN	Sena Ishibashi
21	GK	JPN	Tatsunari Nagai

No.	Pos.	Nation	Player
25	MF	JPN	Hiroaki Okuno
26	MF	JPN	Yuta Fukazawa
28	FW	JPN	Shusuke Ota
29	FW	JPN	Keigo Watanabe
30	MF	JPN	Gota Yamaguchi
31	GK	JPN	Kota Sanada
32	DF	JPN	Naru Yasuda
34	FW	JPN	Hiroto Yamada
35	MF	JPN	Ryu Nakamura ^{Type 2}
36	MF	JPN	Hideaki Matsumura ^{Type 2}
37	DF	JPN	Yūto Suzuki
38	MF	JPN	Sōichirō Kōzuki
39	MF	JPN	Aoi Oshita ^{Type 2}
41	GK	JPN	Hikaru Iwase
77	FW	JPN	Hisatsugu Ishii
86	MF	JPN	Naoki Kase
99	GK	JPN	Naoto Kamifukumoto

=== Out on loan ===
Note: Flags indicate national team as defined under FIFA eligibility rules; some limited exceptions apply. Players may hold more than one non-FIFA nationality.

No.	Pos.	Nation	Player
—	DF	JPN	Shuto Okaniwa (at Iwaki FC)
—	GK	JPN	William Popp (at (Belgium) Beerschot)
—	DF	JPN	Kotaro Honda (at Fukushima United)

No.	Pos.	Nation	Player
—	MF	JPN	Mirei Sugiura (at (Spain) UE Sant Andreu U19)
—	DF	JPN	Kanaru Matsumoto (at Gainare Tottori)

== Club officials ==
Role	Name
Manager	(Japan) Satoshi Yamaguchi
Assistant manager	(Japan) Yoshihiro Natsuka (Japan) Masahiro Koga (Japan) Yoshihiro Yatsukawa
Coach assistant	(Japan) Taiga Soeda
Goalkeeper coach	(Japan) Takeaki Yuhara
Analyst	(Japan) Masayuki Hirakawa
Physical coach	(Japan) Kazutaka Takahashi
Conditioning coach	(Japan) Yuta Iguchi
Chief team doctor	(Japan) Eiichi Suzuki
Team doctor	(Japan) Hirofumi Katsutani (Japan) Makoto Takahashi
Medical group chief trainer	(Japan) Hisayoshi Kojima
Athletic trainer	(Japan) Nobuhide Kurihara (Japan) Takahiro Yoshikawa
Physiotherapist	(Japan) Shusuke Shimada (Japan) Shigeyuki Shimizu
Interpreter	(South Korea) Kim Fan-ju (Brazil) Tiago Higa
Competent	(Japan) Keita Mikami
Side affairs	(Japan) Hiroto Araki (Japan) Takahito Hiraga (Japan) Hiroto Tanaka

== Managerial history ==
Manager	Nationality	Tenure	
Manager	Nationality	Start	Finish
Yukio Shimomura	Japan	1 February 1972	31 December 1974
Yoshinobu Ishii	Japan	1 January 1975	31 December 1980
Tsutomu Nakamura	Japan	1 February 1981	31 January 1985
Hidemitsu Hanaoka	Japan	1 February 1985	30 June 1988
Yoshinobu Ishii	Japan	1 January 1988	31 December 1990
Mitsuru Komaeda	Japan	1 July 1990	27 November 1995
Shigeharu Ueki	Japan	28 November 1995	31 January 1996
Toninho Moura	Brazil	1 February 1996	19 September 1996
Shigeharu Ueki	Japan	20 September 1996	31 January 1999
Eiji Ueda	Japan	1 February 1999	30 June 1999
Mitsuru Komaeda	Japan	1 July 1999	31 January 2000
Hisashi Katō	Japan	1 February 2000	31 January 2001
Kōji Tanaka	Japan	1 February 2001	30 November 2002
Ajam Boujarari Mohammed	Morocco	1 February 2003	15 May 2003
Matsuichi Yamada	Japan	16 May 2003	14 July 2004
Tatsuya Mochizuki	Japan	15 July 2004	13 September 2004
Eiji Ueda	Japan	15 September 2004	5 June 2006
Masaaki Kanno	Japan	5 June 2006	31 January 2009
Yasuharu Sorimachi	Japan	1 February 2009	31 January 2012
Cho Kwi-jae	South Korea	1 February 2012	8 October 2019
Kenji Takahashi	Japan	13 August 2019	9 October 2019
Bin Ukishima	Japan	10 October 2019	31 August 2021
Satoshi Yamaguchi	Japan	1 September 2021	Current

== Record as J.League member ==
Champions	Runners-up	Third place	Promoted	Relegated

League													J.League Cup	Emperor's Cup	Asia	
Season	Div.	Teams	Pos.	P	W (OTW/PKW)	D	L (OTL/PKL)	F	A	GD	Pts	Attendance/G	J.League Cup	Emperor's Cup	Asia	
Bellmare Hiratsuka
1994	J1	12	5th	44	23	–	21	75	80	–5	–	17,836	First round	Winners	–	–
1995	J1	14	11th	52	21	–	29 (–/2)	94	102	–8	65	16,111	–	Second round	CWC	Winners
1996	J1	16	11th	30	12	–	18 (–/0)	47	58	–11	36	10,483	Semi-finals	Quarter-finals	CWC	Quarter-finals
1997	J1	17	8th	32	14	–	12 (–/1)	55	52	3	49	7,841	Group stage	Quarter-finals	Did not qualify	Did not qualify
1998	J1	18	11th	34	12 (2/2)	–	17 (1/0)	53	66	–13	42	10,158	Group stage	Round of 16	Did not qualify	Did not qualify
1999	J1	16	16th	30	4 (0/-)	1	22 (3/0)	30	72	–42	13	7,388	First round	Third round	Did not qualify	Did not qualify
Shonan Bellmare
2000	J2	11	8th	40	12 (3/0)	1	17 (7/–)	59	71	–12	43	4,968	First round	Third round	Did not qualify	Did not qualify
2001	J2	12	8th	44	16 (4/–)	4	18 (2/0)	64	61	3	60	4,112	First round	Second round	Did not qualify	Did not qualify
2002	J2	12	5th	44	16	16	12	46	46	3	64	4,551	Not eligible	Round of 16	Did not qualify	Did not qualify
2003	J2	12	10th	44	11	11	22	33	53	–20	44	4,731	Not eligible	Round of 16	Did not qualify	Did not qualify
2004	J2	12	10th	44	7	15	22	39	64	–25	36	4,691	Not eligible	Round of 16	Did not qualify	Did not qualify
2005	J2	12	7th	44	13	15	16	46	59	–13	54	5,746	Not eligible	Third round	Did not qualify	Did not qualify
2006	J2	13	11th	48	13	10	25	61	87	–26	49	5,365	Not eligible	4th round	Did not qualify	Did not qualify
2007	J2	13	6th	48	23	8	17	72	55	17	77	4,677	Not eligible	4th round	Did not qualify	Did not qualify
2008	J2	15	5th	42	19	8	15	68	48	20	65	5,994	Not eligible	Third round	Did not qualify	Did not qualify
2009	J2	18	3rd	51	29	11	11	84	52	32	98	7,273	Not eligible	Second round	Did not qualify	Did not qualify
2010	J1	18	18th	34	3	7	24	31	82	–51	16	11,095	Group stage	Third round	Did not qualify	Did not qualify
2011	J2	20	14th	38	12	10	16	46	48	–2	46	6,943	Not eligible	Quarter-finals	Did not qualify	Did not qualify
2012	J2	22	2nd	42	20	15	7	66	43	23	75	6,852	Not eligible	Third round	Did not qualify	Did not qualify
2013	J1	18	16th	34	6	7	21	34	62	–28	25	9,911	Group stage	Third round	Did not qualify	Did not qualify
2014	J2	22	1st	42	31	8	3	86	25	61	101	8,478	Not eligible	Third round	Did not qualify	Did not qualify
2015	J1	18	8th	34	13	9	12	40	44	–4	48	12,208	Group stage	Third round	Did not qualify	Did not qualify
2016	J1	18	17th	34	7	6	21	30	56	–26	27	11,530	Group stage	Quarter-finals	Did not qualify	Did not qualify
2017	J2	22	1st	42	24	11	7	58	36	22	83	8,454	Not eligible	Third round	Did not qualify	Did not qualify
2018	J1	18	13th	34	10	11	13	38	43	–5	41	12,120	Winners	Round of 16	Did not qualify	Did not qualify
2019	J1	18	16th	34	10	6	18	40	63	–23	36	12,848	Group stage	Second round	Did not qualify	Did not qualify
2020 †	J1	18	18th	34	6	9	19	29	48	–19	27	4,467	Group stage	Did not qualify	Did not qualify	Did not qualify
2021 †	J1	20	16th	38	7	16	15	36	41	–5	37	4,850	Play-off stage	Round of 16	Did not qualify	Did not qualify
2022	J1	18	12th	34	10	11	13	31	39	–8	41	9,228	Play-off stage	Third round	Did not qualify	Did not qualify
2023	J1	18	15th	34	8	10	16	40	56	–16	34	13,161	Group stage	Quarter-finals	Did not qualify	Did not qualify
2024	J1	20	15th	38	12	9	17	53	58	–5	45	11,315	Second round	Round of 16	Did not qualify	Did not qualify
2025	J1	20	19th	38	8	8	22	36	63	–27	32	11,426	Quarter-finals	Third round	Did not qualify	Did not qualify
2026	J2	40	12th	18	8	4	6	25	19	6	31	7,774	N/A	N/A	Did not qualify	Did not qualify
2026–27	J2	20	TBD	38									TBD	TBD	Did not qualify	Did not qualify

Key

- Pos. = Position in league; P = Games played; W = Games won; D = Games drawn; L = Games lost; F = Goals scored; A = Goals conceded; GD = Goals difference; Pts = Points gained
- Attendance/G = Average home league attendance
- OTW / PKW = Overtime wins / Penalty kicks wins (1997 and 1998 seasons); 1999, 2000, 2001 and 2002 extra time wins only
- OTL / PKL = Overtime losses / Penalty kicks losses (1997 and 1998 seasons); 1999, 2000 & 2001 extra time losses only
- † 2020 & 2021 seasons attendances were reduced by COVID-19 pandemic

== Honours ==
As Towa / Fujita (until 1992); Bellmare Hiratsuka (1993–1999) and Shonan Bellmare (2000–present)

Shonan Bellmare honours
Competition	No.	Years
Kanto Soccer League	1	1971
All Japan Senior Football Championship	1	1971
JSL Cup	1	1973
Emperor's Cup	3	1977, 1979, 1994
Japan Soccer League Division 1	3	1977, 1979, 1981
Japanese Super Cup	2	1978, 1982
Japan Soccer League Division 2	1	1991–92
Japan Football League Division 1	1	1993
Asian Cup Winners' Cup	1	1995
J2 League	2	2014, 2017
BTV Cup	1	2016
J.League Cup	1	2018

== League history ==
- Kanto Football League: 1970–71
- Division 1 (Japan Soccer League Div. 1): 1972–89 (1972–74 as Towa Real Estate Development; 1975–89 as Fujita Industries)
- Division 2 (Japan Soccer League Div. 2): 1990–91 (as Fujita Industries)
- Division 2 (Japan Football League (former) Div. 1): 1992–93 (as Fujita Industries)
- Division 1 (J.League Div. 1): 1994–99 (as Bellmare Hiratsuka)
- Division 2 (J.League Div. 2): 2000–09 (as Shonan Bellmare)
- Division 1 (J.League Div. 1): 2010
- Division 2 (J.League Div. 2): 2011–12
- Division 1 (J.League Div. 1): 2013
- Division 2 (J.League Div. 2): 2014
- Division 1 (J1 League): 2015–16
- Division 2 (J2 League): 2017
- Division 1 (J1 League): 2018–2025
- Division 2 (J2 League): 2026-

Total (after 2025): 36 seasons in the top tier, 18 seasons in the second tier and 2 seasons in the Regional Leagues.

=== Kit evolution ===
Home Kits - 1st
1994 - 1996	1997 - 1998	1999 - 2000	2001 - 2002	2003 - 2004
2005 - 2006	2007	2008	2009	2010
2011	2012	2013	2014	2015
2016	2017	2018	2019	2020
2021	2022	2023	2024	2025 -

Away Kits - 2nd
1994 - 1996	1997 - 1998	1999 - 2000	2001 - 2002	2003 - 2004
2005 - 2006	2007	2008	2009	2010
2011	2012	2013	2014	2015
2016	2017	2018	2019	2020
2021	2022	2023 -		

== See also ==
- Shonan Bellmare Futsal Club
