= Urawa Red Diamonds =

Association football club in Japan

- Full name: Urawa Red Diamonds
- Nicknames: Reds (レッズ, Rezzu); Red Devils (赤い悪魔, Akai Akuma)
- Founded: 1950; 76 years ago as Mitsubishi Motors FC
- Stadium: Saitama Stadium 2002; Saitama, Japan
- Capacity: 63,700
- Owner: Mitsubishi Heavy Industries
- Chairman: Makoto Taguchi
- Manager: Cho Kwi-jae
- League: J1 League
- 2026: J1 League, 12th of 20
- Website: urawa-reds.co.jp
Home colours	Away colours	Third colours

The Urawa Red Diamonds (浦和レッドダイヤモンズ, Urawa Reddo Daiyamonzu) or simply the Urawa Reds (浦和レッズ, Urawa Rezzu), also known as Mitsubishi Urawa Football Club (三菱浦和フットボールクラブ, Mitsubishi Urawa futoobōru Kurabu) from April 1992 to January 1996, are a professional football club in the city of Saitama, part of the Greater Tokyo Area in Japan, who play in the J1 League, the top tier of Japanese football.

The club's name comes from the former city of Urawa, now part of Saitama, and pre-professional era parent company Mitsubishi, whose logo consists of three red diamonds, one of which remains within the current club badge.

Urawa Reds are one of the most successful clubs in the country and various domestic titles winning 1 J1 League title including a joint-record 8 Emperor's Cups, 2 J.League Cup and 5 Japanese Super Cup. Continentally, Urawa Reds became a 3 time AFC Champions League winner cementing their place in history as Asian champions (most recently in 2022) . The club also won the J.League Cup / Copa Sudamericana Championship in 2017. Internationally, Urawa Reds has made three appearances in the FIFA Club World Cup with their best results being in the 2007 edition finishing in third place.

== History ==
Mitsubishi Heavy Industries established a football club in 1950 in Kobe and moved the club to Tokyo in 1958. In 1965 it formed the Japan Soccer League (JSL) along with today's JEF United Chiba, Kashiwa Reysol, Cerezo Osaka, Sanfrecce Hiroshima and three other clubs who have since been relegated to regional leagues ("Original Eight" (Note: The original clubs of the Japan Soccer League in 1965 were Mitsubishi Motors, Furukawa Electric, Hitachi, Yanmar Diesel, Toyo Kogyo, Yawata Steel, Toyota Industries and Nagoya Mutual Bank.)).

Mitsubishi first won the JSL championship in 1969, as a break in Mazda/Sanfrecce's dominance (and also with the fact that Toyo were in Bangkok, Thailand, competing in the Asian Club Cup); their runs up the first division were sporadic but steady until the 1980s when they fell into the Second Division. In 1990 they were promoted as JSL Division 2 champions, and thus were ready when the J-League implementation began in earnest. Urawa Red Diamonds was an original member ("Original Ten" (Note: The original clubs of the J.League in 1993 were Kashima Antlers, Urawa, JEF United Ichihara, Verdy Kawasaki, Yokohama Marinos, Yokohama Flügels, Shimizu S-Pulse, Nagoya Grampus Eight, Gamba Osaka and Sanfrecce Hiroshima.)) of the J.League in 1993.

=== Domestic treble ===
Mitsubishi were the first Japanese club to complete a domestic treble, when in 1978 they won the title, the Emperor's Cup and the Japan Soccer League Cup.

==== Name change ====
The club's name was then changed to ''Mitsubishi Urawa Football Club'' from in April 1992 where their nickname was "Red Diamonds". However, in February 1996, the club's name was changed to "Urawa Red Diamonds".

The club has experienced varying degrees of success since the inception of the J-League. The team finished at the bottom of the league for the first two seasons, with an average attendance of fewer than 15,000. In 1999, they were relegated to the second tier of Japanese football once again., the club's performance has improved in years, beginning with a victory in the 2003 Nabisco Cup.

In 2006, Urawa Reds clinched their first professional league title by defeating runners-up Gamba Osaka 3–2 on December 2 in front of 63,000 supporters. This after two close calls in the previous two years. In 2005, they finished second, just one point behind champions Gamba Osaka. In 2004, they finished third in the first stage and won the second stage and qualified for the two-match J.League Championship decider, they lost on penalty shootout to Yokohama F. Marinos.

=== Back to back cup champion ===
Urawa Reds were back to back Emperor's Cup winners in 2005 and 2006. Winning the title for the first time since their establishment as a professional club, they defeated Shimizu S-Pulse 2–1 on 1 January 2006, and retained the title in 2007 with a 1–0 win over Gamba Osaka. This win also completed a league-cup double. In the 2007 tournament they were defeated at the first hurdle by J2 League outfit Ehime FC.

In 2007, despite a seemingly unassailable lead of seven points with four games remaining, Urawa Reds picked up only two points from their final four games. This run included losing at home to Kashima Antlers; the club who would leapfrog Urawa on the final day of the season to claim their fifth J.League title. Following their capitulation in the fourth round of the Emperor's Cup to J2 League outfit Ehime FC, Urawa Reds had to be content with their 2007 AFC Champions League fixtures.

=== AFC Champions League champions ===
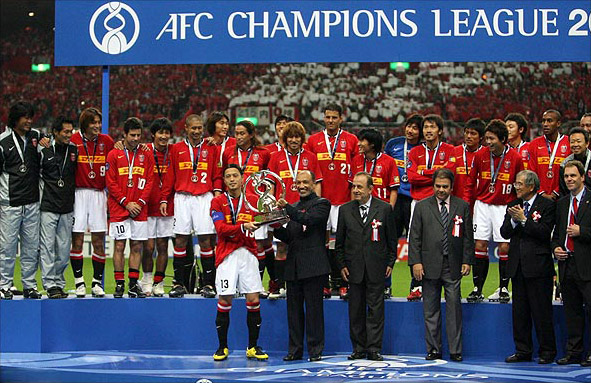
Urawa Reds players lifting the 2007 AFC Champions League trophy

Urawa Reds recorded their first prestigious cup overcoming Iranian club Sepahan 3–1 on aggregate to clinch the 2007 AFC Champions League trophy. The victory made them the first Japanese side to win the cup since the competition was reorganised from the Asian Champions Cup in 2003. In the 2007 FIFA Club World Cup of the same year, Urawa Reds became the first AFC club to finish in third place, beating Tunisian side Étoile Sportive du Sahel on penalty shootout in the third/fourth place play off.

Throughout the 2008 AFC Champions League edition, Urawa Reds attempted to win their second consecutive AFC Champions League title and progressed to the semi-finals where they were defeated by fellow J-League rivals, and eventual Champions League winners, Gamba Osaka 3–1 on aggregate.

On 8 March 2014, a banner which read "JAPANESE ONLY" was hung at one of the entrances to the stands. As punishment for this racist behavior, the league match on 28 March was played behind closed doors.

In the 2017 AFC Champions League edition, Urawa Reds had a good run throughout the entire tournament which saw them face Saudi Arabia club, Al-Hilal in the final which saw Urawa Reds winning the 2017 AFC Champions League final 2–1 on aggregate to clinch their 2nd trophy.

Urawa Reds managed to make their way through all the way until the 2019 AFC Champions League final facing off against Al-Hilal once again. However, the club fell in a 3–0 aggregate loss to the Saudi Arabian club.

=== Third time AFC Champions League champions ===
During the 2022 AFC Champions League, Urawa Reds had an easier run en route to the final where they faced three Southeast Asian club along the way, Singapore league champions Lion City Sailors in the group stage while they faced Malaysia league champions Johor Darul Ta'zim 5–0 in the Round of 16 and Thailand league champions BG Pathum United 4–0 in the Quarter-finals. Urawa Reds would then face Korea league champions, Jeonbuk Hyundai Motors in the semi-finals which ended up with Urawa Reds advancing to the final after winning the penalty shootout. The club faced their tournament rivals Al-Hilal for the third time in the 2022 AFC Champions League final. Urawa Red won 2–1 on aggregate, clinching their 3rd trophy.

On 19 September 2023, it was announced by JFA that Urawa Reds will not be participating in 2024 edition of Emperor's Cup following supporters clash after 0–3 lost against Nagoya Grampus in the 4th round of 2023 edition.

In 2025, Urawa Reds participated in the newly revamp 2025 FIFA Club World Cup held in USA where they were drawn in Group E alongside Inter Milan, Monterrey and River Plate.

== Team image ==
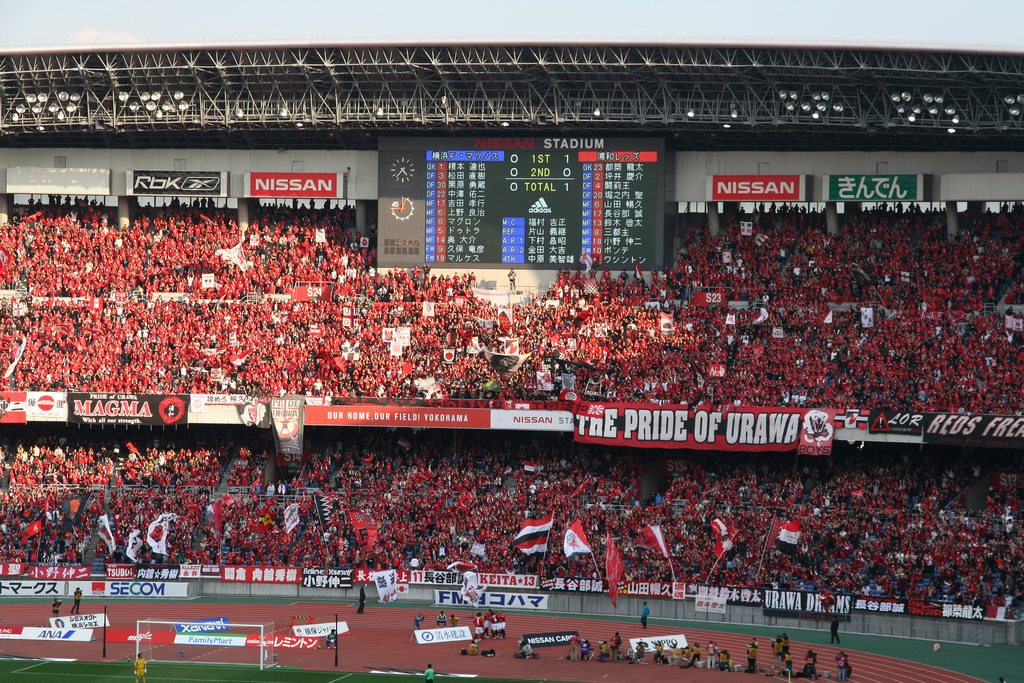
Urawa Red Diamonds fans

=== Supporters ===
Urawa Red Diamonds are associated with right-wing and nationalistic supporters. Since the early 2000s, sections of their ultras (particularly the "Urawa Boys" and related groups) have drawn widespread criticism for xenophobic and confrontational behaviour. These include the display of the Rising Sun Flag, anti-Korean chants, and provocative banners, both at home and away fixtures. In 2008, violent clashes broke out between Urawa and Gamba Osaka supporters at Saitama Stadium, resulting in an hours-long standoff. This was, at the time, considered the most serious act of fan violence in Japanese football history. In 2010, Urawa Red Diamonds were fined $50,000 after a group of their supporters directed taunts at foreign players from rival club Vegalta Sendai. The club's most notorious incident occurred in March 2014, when a "Japanese Only" banner was hung at Saitama Stadium during a league fixture. The banner, widely condemned as racist, led the J.League to impose its first-ever closed-door match as punishment. The incident sparked national and international backlash and prompted the formal dissolution of Urawa's supporter groups in the "Curva Est" section, though the Urawa Boys later reformed in 2018.

Further problems persisted; In 2020–2022, during the COVID-19 pandemic, Urawa fans repeatedly defied public health regulations, including bans on singing, chanting, and mandatory mask-wearing. The club was fined ¥20 million and warned that future infractions could lead to match forfeitures or points deductions. In August 2023, after a 3-0 Emperor's Cup loss to Nagoya Grampus, over 70 Urawa supporters invaded the pitch, tearing down barriers and clashing with security and rival fans. The Japan Football Association (JFA) described it as a collective riot and imposed a ban on Urawa from the 2024 Emperor's Cup. Eighteen individuals were banned from matches, and the club was accused of failing to rein in supporters over many years.

In total, since 2000, Urawa Red Diamonds have been sanctioned at least 11 times for serious supporter misconduct, including fines, official warnings, spectator bans, and competition suspensions. The club has been repeatedly criticised for tolerating and enabling its most fervent ultras, often portraying disciplinary action as an attack on fan culture rather than confronting extremist behaviour directly.

=== Rivalries ===
==== Saitama derby ====
Urawa Red Diamonds has a local derby with Omiya Ardija, from Ōmiya-ku, Saitama city. They first met in the 1987 Emperor's Cup, with Mitsubishi defeating NTT Kanto by 5 to 0 at Nishigaoka National Stadium. The derby first took place in the JSL Second Division in the 1989–90 season, and it would not take place until the 2000 season when Urawa was relegated to the second tier again. In 2003 the formerly separate Omiya and Urawa cities merged to become Saitama city, and since 2005 the derby became a top-flight fixture after Omiya was promoted.

==== Marunouchi Gosanke ====
During the JSL years and into the 1990s, Urawa's main top-flight rivals were JEF United Chiba and Kashiwa Reysol, both now based in Chiba Prefecture. Because of their former parent companies' headquarters being all based in Marunouchi, Tokyo, the three clubs were known as the Marunouchi Gosanke (丸の内御三家, "Marunouchi Big Three") and fixtures among them were known as the Marunouchi derbies, although the term is falling out of use as they are now based in different prefectures and rarely play home games in Tokyo stadiums.

==== Others ====
Rivals further afield include Kashima Antlers, FC Tokyo, Yokohama Marinos, Kawasaki Frontale, and, even farther away, Gamba Osaka. Old JSL championship rivalries with Sanfrecce Hiroshima, Cerezo Osaka and Shonan Bellmare have ebbed down as those clubs had nadirs in the second tier.

=== Friendships ===
The club's supporters also have an unofficial relationship with Chinese club Shanghai Shenhua, who are known as the "Blue Devils" (complementing the "Red Devils" nickname for Urawa). The clubs' supporters will support each other in continental competition. For example, Shenhua fans will support Urawa Reds when Urawa Reds play in Shanghai against Shanghai SIPG.

The connection began in 2007 following an AFC Champions League match in Shanghai, where the two groups met and developed a rapport. Since then, they have maintained contact through reciprocal visits and shared matchday gatherings. Support for Urawa from some Shenhua fans, particularly during matches involving other Chinese clubs such as Shanghai SIPG, has sparked criticism from portions of the domestic fanbase, who call Shanghai Shenhua fans "traitors" for supporting a Japanese team. Shanghai Shenhua supporters' actions have also attracted negative attention from media outlets and authorities. Nonetheless, members of the Blue Devils have continued to express support for Urawa, including by attending matches in Japan and displaying banners during local derbies. Reporters have suggested that Shanghai's support for Urawa comes from Shanghai fans wanting to reject the Beijing government and nationalistic politics in favour of regionalist pride.

=== Mascots ===
The Red Diamonds have four mascots: Redia, Friendia, Schale, and Diarra. However, Redia doesn't make much appearances at Saitama Stadium, due to the club's policy of the stadium being a "place for serious competition". When he does occasionally appear at the stadium, he does not participate in any fan activities. Because of this, Reds fans dubbed him as a NEET mascot (which is an acronym for "No education, employment, or training"). According to the club profile, Redia and Friendia were married during a Reds fan festival in 1997. The younger twin mascots, Schale and Diarra, were born on the day the Red Diamonds won their first J. League Championship in 2006.

=== International affiliation ===
The club is also notable in that former Feyenoord midfielder Shinji Ono began his professional career playing for Urawa Reds. Ono returned for the 2006 season for a second stint with the club. Urawa Reds is affiliated with German club Bayern Munich, whose nickname is also "The Reds". Karl-Heinz Rummenigge, the chairman of the Bayern Munich, announced that "We have been looking for clubs which have potential ability, management stability and cordial confidence. We could fulfill the desire to affiliate with this great club, Urawa Reds." Some other foreign clubs, such as Arsenal, Club Atlético Independiente, CR Flamengo, VfB Stuttgart, Manchester United, Feyenoord, Hamburger SV and Perth Glory, visited Japan and played friendly games at the Saitama Stadium.

In August 2004, Urawa Reds appeared in a pre-season four-club friendly tournament, the Vodafone Cup, at Old Trafford, the home ground of Manchester United. Urawa Reds missed a few key players, losing their first match 5–2 against the Argentinian side Boca Juniors. The second fixture against the hosts, Manchester United, was called off due to a massive electric storm. Some 800 Urawa Reds fans had travelled to the game and were later compensated.

=== Women's team ===
The club also has a women's football team, currently playing in the WE League as Urawa Reds Ladies.

== Stadium ==
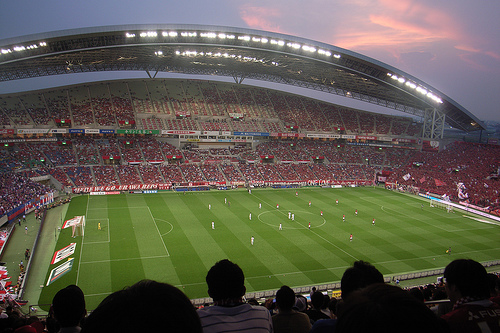
Saitama stadium

Since the establishment of J.League in 1992, the club had used the Urawa Komaba Stadium as its home stadium. Due to the increasing popularity of the matches, Saitama City, owner of the stadium, expanded the seat capacity. During the renovation, the club used Ōmiya Park Soccer Stadium. In spite of the poor performance of the club, the stadium was filled with faithful supporters.

=== New home ground ===
In October 2001, Saitama Prefecture built new football-specific Saitama Stadium in Saitama city. This stadium was used as a venue for the 2002 FIFA World Cup. After the 2002 FIFA World Cup, the club gradually increased home games in Saitama Stadium and in 2003 the stadium was formally designated as the home stadium. In 2008, only two games were held at Komaba Stadium.

=== Facilities ===
Urawa Reds uses Ohara City Field for training. In addition to this facility, the club opened Redsland in 2005, which has three grass fields, one artificial turf field, one baseball field, futsal courts and tennis courts. Redsland is opened to the public and club members can use the facilities at relatively cheap fees.

== Kit suppliers and shirt sponsors ==
=== Sponsors ===
Year	Kit manufacturer	Main sponsor
1988–1999	(Germany) Puma	No sponsors
1990–1992	(Germany) Puma	(Japan) Mitsubishi Motors
1993–1996	(Japan) Mizuno	(Japan) Mitsubishi Motors
1997	(England) Umbro	(Japan) Mitsubishi Motors
1998–2002	(Germany) Puma	(Japan) Mitsubishi Motors
2003	(Germany) Puma	(Japan) Colt
2004	(United States) Nike	(Japan) Mitsubishi Motors
2005–2006	(United States) Nike	(England) Vodafone
2007–2012	(United States) Nike	(Japan) Savas
2013–2021	(United States) Nike	(Japan) Polus
2020	(United States) Nike	(Japan) Mitsubishi Heavy Industries
2021–present	(United States) Nike	(Japan) Polus (Japan) Mitsubishi Heavy Industries (AFC matches)

=== Kit evolution ===
Home kit - 1st
1992	1993–1994	1995–1996	1997	1998
1999–2000	2001–2002	2003	2004	2005
2006	2007	2008	2009	2010
2011	2012	2013	2014	2015
2016	2017	2018	2019	2020
2021	2022	2023	2024	2025–

Away kit - 2nd
1992	1993–1994	1995–1996	1997	1998
1999–2000	2001–2002	2003	2004–2005	2006–2007
2008–2009	2010	2011	2012	2013
2014	2015	2016	2017	2018
2019	2020	2021	2022	2023
2024	2025–			

Alternative kit - 3rd
1992 - 1993; Cup 1st	1992 - 1993; Cup 2nd	1994 - 1996; Cup 1st	1994 - 1996; Cup 2nd	1997; Cup 1st
1997; Cup 2nd	2012 3rd	2013 3rd	2014 3rd	2017 3rd
2019 3rd	2020 3rd	2022; PSG game	2022; Eintracht Frankfurt game	2023 3rd
2023; ACL 2022	ACL2023/24; 1st FIFA 2023; 1st	ACL 2023/24; 2nd FIFA 2023; 2nd	2024 3rd	2025 3rd

== Players ==
=== First-team squad ===
As of 27 September 2026.

Note: Flags indicate national team as defined under FIFA eligibility rules; some limited exceptions apply. Players may hold more than one non-FIFA nationality.

No.	Pos.	Nation	Player
1	GK	JPN	Shūsaku Nishikawa
2	DF	JPN	Yūta Miyamoto (vice-captain)
3	DF	BRA	Danilo Boza
5	DF	JPN	Kenta Nemoto
6	DF	JPN	Miki Yamane
7	MF	JPN	Takurō Kaneko (vice-captain)
8	MF	JPN	Kota Mizunuma
10	MF	BRA	Matheus Sávio
11	MF	SWE	Samuel Gustafson
12	MF	JPN	Tatsuki Seko
13	MF	JPN	Ryōma Watanabe (captain)
15	DF	JPN	Kōta Kudō
17	FW	JPN	Hiiro Komori
18	DF	JPN	Kotaro Hayashi
23	GK	JPN	Kōki Fukui
25	MF	JPN	Kaito Yasui
28	DF	JPN	Yoshitaka Tanaka ^{Type 2}

No.	Pos.	Nation	Player
29	MF	JPN	Yota Horiuchi
31	DF	JPN	Atsushi Inagaki
32	DF	JPN	Eiichi Katayama
33	MF	JPN	Shuta Sasa
34	DF	JPN	Reon Tanaka ^{DSP}
36	FW	JPN	Renji Hidano
37	MF	JPN	Hayate Ueki
39	MF	JPN	Junpei Hayakawa
40	DF	AUS	Luka Didulica
42	FW	JPN	Harumi Minamino
43	MF	JPN	Takeshi Wada ^{Type 2}
44	GK	JPN	Yoshiaki Arai
45	FW	JPN	Ado Onaiwu
46	MF	JPN	Kotaro Nakamura ^{Type 2}
47	DF	JPN	Atsuro Takahashi ^{Type 2}
88	MF	JPN	Yōichi Naganuma

=== Out on loan ===
Note: Flags indicate national team as defined under FIFA eligibility rules; some limited exceptions apply. Players may hold more than one non-FIFA nationality.

No.	Pos.	Nation	Player
26	DF	JPN	Takuya Ogiwara (at (Belgium) OH Leuven)
27	FW	JPN	Toshikazu Teruuchi (at FC Ryukyu)

No.	Pos.	Nation	Player
35	GK	JPN	Ryusei Sato (at Montedio Yamagata)

== Management and staff ==
As of 23 February 2026

Position	Name
Sporting director	(Japan) Hisashi Tsuchida
Interim manager	(Japan) Tatsuya Tanaka
Assistant manager	(Japan) Maiki Hayashi (Japan) Nobuyasu Ikeda (Japan) Masato Maesako (Japan) Tomoki Hasegawa
Goalkeeper coach	(Japan) Hitoshi Shiota
Physical coach	(Japan) Tatsuru Ishiguri
Analyst	(Japan) Kentaro Nagai

== Honours ==
As both Mitsubishi Motors (amateur era) and Urawa Red Diamonds (professional era)

Type	Honours	Titles	Season
League	J1 League	1	2006
League	Japan Soccer League Division 1	4	1969, 1973, 1978, 1982
League	Japan Soccer League Division 2	1	1989–90
Cup	Emperor's Cup	8	1971, 1973, 1978, 1980, 2005, 2006, 2018, 2021
Cup	J.League Cup	2	2003, 2016
Cup	Japanese Super Cup	5	1979, 1980, 1983, 2006, 2022
Cup	JSL Cup	2	1978, 1981
Continental	AFC Champions League	3	2007, 2017, 2022
Regional	J.League Cup / Copa Sudamericana Championship	1	2017

Bold is for those competition that are currently active.

== Records and statistics ==
As of 19 March 2026.

Top 10 all-time appearances
Rank	Player	Years	Club appearance
1	(Japan) Nobuhisa Yamada	1994–2013	725
2	(Japan) Shūsaku Nishikawa	2014–present	529
3	(Japan) Keita Suzuki	2000–2015	508
4	(Japan) Yuki Abe	2007–2010, 2012–2022	502
5	(Japan) Tadaaki Hirakawa	2002–2018	456
6	(Japan) Tomoaki Makino	2012–2021	421
7	(Japan) Shinzō Kōroki	2013–2024	420
8	(Japan) Takahiro Sekine	2013–2017, 2019–present	412
9	(Japan) Yōsuke Kashiwagi	2010–2021	409
10	(Japan) Tomoya Ugajin	2010–2021, 2024	401

Top 10 all-time goalscorer
Rank	Player	Club appearance	Total goals
2	(Japan) Masahiro Fukuda	355	172
2	(Japan) Shinzō Kōroki	420	156
3	(Qatar) Emerson Sheik	129	94
4	(Japan) Yuichiro Nagai	373	82
5	(Japan) Tatsuya Tanaka	295	78
6	(Brazil) Edmílson	141	61
7	(Brazil) Washington	75	59
8	(Japan) Yuki Muto	269	53
9	(Japan) Yuki Abe	502	52
10	(Japan) Yōsuke Kashiwagi	409	49

- Biggest wins:
  - 9–0 vs Mitsubishi Cable Industries SC (17 December 1972)
  - 9–0 vs Minebea Mitsumi (3 December 2000)
- Heaviest defeats: 1–8 vs Nagoya Grampus (29 May 1999)
- Youngest goal scorers: Takahiro Kunimoto ~ 16 years 8 days old (On 16 October 2013 vs Montedio Yamagata)
- Oldest goal scorers: Yuki Abe ~ 39 years 8 months 3 days old (On 9 May 2021 vs Vegalta Sendai)
- Youngest ever debutant: Takahiro Kunimoto ~ 16 years 8 days old (On 16 October 2013 vs Montedio Yamagata)
- Oldest ever player: Yuki Abe ~ 40 years 2 months 28 days old (On 4 December 2021 vs Nagoya Grampus)

== Award winners ==
=== FIFA World Cup players ===
The following players have represented their country at the FIFA World Cup whilst playing for Urawa Red Diamonds:

1998 FIFA World Cup

- (Japan) Masayuki Okano
- (Japan) Shinji Ono
- (Federal Republic of Yugoslavia) Željko Petrović

2006 FIFA World Cup

- (Japan) Alex
- (Japan) Shinji Ono
- (Japan) Keisuke Tsuboi

2010 FIFA World Cup

- (Japan) Yuki Abe

2014 FIFA World Cup

- (Japan) Shusaku Nishikawa

2018 FIFA World Cup

- (Japan) Wataru Endo
- (Japan) Tomoaki Makino
- (Australia) Andrew Nabbout

2022 FIFA World Cup

- (Japan) Hiroki Sakai

=== Club captains ===
- (Japan) Koichi Shitani (1992–1993)
- (Japan) Masahiro Fukuda (1994–1997)
- (Japan) Takashi Tsuchida (1998–1999)
- (Japan) Shinji Ono (2000–2001)
- (Japan) Masami Ihara (2001–2002)
- (Japan) Hideki Uchidate (2003)
- (Japan) Nobuhisa Yamada (2004–2008)
- (Japan) Keita Suzuki (2009–2011)
- (Japan) Yuki Abe (2012–2017)
- (Japan) Yōsuke Kashiwagi (2018–2019)
- (Japan) Shusaku Nishikawa (2020–2022)
- (Japan) Hiroki Sakai (2023–2024)
- (Japan) Takahiro Sekine (2025)
- (Japan) Ryōma Watanabe (2026–present)

== Former players ==
=== International capped players ===
JFA.: (Japan) Masayuki Okano; (Japan) Shinji Ono; (Japan) Keisuke Tsuboi; (Japan) Alessandro Santos; (Japan) Masahiro Fukuda; (Japan) Yuichiro Nagai; (Japan) Nobuhisa Yamada; (Japan) Marcus Tulio Tanaka; (Japan) Tatsuya Tanaka; (Japan) Teruaki Kurobe; (Japan) Tomoyuki Sakai; (Japan) Hiromitsu Isogai; (Japan) Ryōta Tsuzuki; (Japan) Naohiro Takahara; (Japan) Hajime Hosogai; (Japan) Yuki Abe; (Japan) Makoto Hasebe; (Japan) Keita Suzuki; (Japan) Tadanari Lee; (Japan) Ryota Moriwaki; (Japan) Naoki Yamada; (Japan) Genki Haraguchi; (Japan) Shūsaku Nishikawa; (Japan) Wataru Endo; (Japan) Tomoaki Makino; (Japan) Shinzō Kōroki; (Japan) Yōsuke Kashiwagi; (Japan) Tomoya Ugajin; (Japan) Yuki Muto; (Japan) Kazuki Nagasawa; (Japan) Kenyu Sugimoto; (Japan) Ataru Esaka; (Japan) Hiroki Sakai; (Japan) Zion Suzuki; (Japan) Atsuki Itō; (Japan) Hiroki Abe; (Japan) Shōya Nakajima	AFC/ CAF/ OFC.: (Australia) Matthew Spiranovic; (Australia) Ned Zelic; (Australia) Andrew Nabbout; (Australia) Thomas Deng; (Qatar) Emerson Sheik; (South Korea) Cho Kwi-jea; (South Korea) Gwak Kyung-keun; (Thailand) Ekanit Panya; (Burkina Faso) Wilfried Sanou; (Ghana) Faisal Mohammed; (Guinea) José Kanté	UEFA.: (Austria) Michael Baur; (Croatia) Tomislav Marić; (Denmark) Brian Steen Nielsen; (France) Basile Boli; (Germany) Uwe Bein; (Germany) Guido Buchwald; (Germany) Uwe Rahn; (Germany) Michael Rummenigge; (Italy) Giuseppe Zappella; (Montenegro) Željko Petrović; (Netherlands) Alfred Nijhuis; (Poland) Andrzej Kubica; (Russia) Yuriy Nikiforov; (Serbia) Ranko Despotović; (Slovakia) Ľubomír Luhový; (Slovakia) Miroslav Mentel; (Slovenia) Zlatan Ljubijankić; (Spain) Txiki Begiristain; (Turkey) Alpay Özalan; (Sweden) David Moberg	CONMEBOL.: (Argentina) Osvaldo Escudero; (Argentina) Victor Ferreyra; (Argentina) Marcelo Morales; (Argentina) Marcelo Trivisonno; (Brazil) Adiel; (Brazil) Adriano Gerlin; (Brazil) Donizete Oliveira; (Brazil) Edmílson; (Brazil) Edmundo; (Brazil) Harison; (Brazil) Márcio Richardes; (Brazil) Mazola; (Brazil) Nenê; (Brazil) Robson Ponte; (Brazil) Popó; (Brazil) Eliézio; (Brazil) Toninho; (Brazil) Tuto; (Brazil) Washington; (Uruguay) Fernando Picun

== Managerial history ==
Name	Period	Honours
(Japan) Hiroshi Ninomiya	1 February 1967 – 31 January 1975	– 1969 Japan Soccer League Division 1 – 1971 Emperor's Cup – 1973 Japan Soccer League Division 1 – 1973 Emperor's Cup
(Japan) Kenzo Yokoyama	1 February 1975 – 31 January 1984	– 1978 Japan Soccer League Division 1 – 1978 Emperor's Cup – 1978 JSL Cup – 1979 Japanese Super Cup – 1980 Emperor's Cup – 1980 Japanese Super Cup – 1981 JSL Cup – 1982 Japan Soccer League Division 1 – 1983 Japanese Super Cup
(Japan) Kuniya Daini	1 February 1984 – 30 June 1989	
(Japan) Kazuo Saito	1 July 1989 – 30 June 1992	– 1989–90 Japan Soccer League Division 2
(Japan) Takaji Mori	1 July 1993 – 31 January 1994	
(Japan) Kenzo Yokoyama (2)	1 February 1994 – 31 January 1995	
As Urawa Red Diamonds
(Germany) Holger Osieck	1 February 1995 – 31 December 1996	
(Germany) Horst Köppel	1 February 1997 – 31 December 1998	
(Japan) Hiromi Hara	1 February 1998 – 30 June 1999	
(Netherlands) Aad de Mos	1 July 1999 – 3 December 1999	
(Japan) Yasushi Yoshida	4 December 1999 – 31 January 2000	
(Japan) Kazuo Saito (2)	2 February 2000 – 2 October 2000	
(Japan) Kenzo Yokoyama (3)	3 October 2000 – 31 January 2001	
(Brazil) Tita	1 February 2001 – 27 August 2001	
(Brazil) Pita	28 August 2001 – 31 January 2001	
(Netherlands) Hans Ooft	1 February 2002 – 31 January 2004	– 2003 J.League Cup
(Germany) Guido Buchwald	1 February 2004 – 31 January 2007	– 2005 Emperor's Cup – 2006 J1 League – 2006 Emperor's Cup – 2006 Japanese Super Cup
(Germany) Holger Osieck (2)	1 February 2007 – 16 March 2008	– 2007 AFC Champions League
(Germany) Gert Engels	16 March 2008 – 27 November 2008	
(Germany) Volker Finke	1 February 2009 – 31 January 2011	
(Montenegro) Željko Petrović	1 February 2011 – 20 October 2011	
(Japan) Takafumi Hori (caretaker)	20 October 2011 – 31 January 2012	
(Serbia) Mihailo Petrović	1 February 2012 – 30 July 2017	– 2016 J.League Cup
(Japan) Takafumi Hori	31 July 2017 – 2 April 2018	– 2017 AFC Champions League – 2017 J.League Cup / Copa Sudamericana Championship
(Japan) Tsuyoshi Otsuki	3 April 2018 – 24 April 2018	
(Brazil) Oswaldo de Oliveira	25 April 2018 – 28 May 2019	– 2018 Emperor's Cup
(Japan) Tsuyoshi Otsuki (2)	29 May 2019 – 22 December 2020	
(Spain) Ricardo Rodríguez	22 December 2020 – 30 October 2022	– 2021 Emperor's Cup – 2022 Japanese Super Cup
(Poland) Maciej Skorża	10 November 2022 – 30 December 2023	– 2022 AFC Champions League
(Norway) Per-Mathias Høgmo	1 January 2024 – 27 August 2024	
(Japan) Nobuyasu Ikeda (interim)	27 August 2024 – 1 September 2024	
(Poland) Maciej Skorża (2)	1 September 2024 – 28 April 2026	
(Japan) Tatsuya Tanaka (interim)	28 April 2026–12 June 2026	
(South Korea) Cho Kwi-jae	17 June 2026–present	

== Season by season record ==
Champions	Runners-up	Third place	Promoted	Relegated

Season	Div.	Teams	Pos.	Avg. Attd.	J.League Cup	Emperor's Cup	Super Cup	AFC CL	Others	
1992	–				Group stage	Semi-final	–	–		
1993	J1	10	10th	11,459	Group stage	2nd round	–	–		
1994	J1	12	12th	18,475	3rd round	–	–	–		
1995	J1	14	4th	19,560	–	Quarter-final	–	–		
1996	J1	16	6th	24,329	Semi-final	–	–	–		
1997	J1	17	10th	20,504	Round of 16	–	–	–		
1998	J1	18	6th	22,706	Group stage	Quarter-final	–	–		
1999	J1	16	15th	21,206	Round of 16	–	–	–		
2000	J2	11	2nd	16,923	Round of 16	–	–	–		
2001	J1	16	10th	26,720	Quarter-final	Semi-final	–	–		
2002	J1	16	11th	26,296	Runners-up	3rd round	–	–		
2003	J1	16	6th	28,855	Winners	3rd round	–	–		
2004	J1	16	2nd	36,660	Runners-up	Semi-final	–	–		
2005	J1	18	2nd	39,357	Semi-final	Winners	–	–		
2006	J1	18	1st	45,573	Quarter-final	Winners	Winners	–		
2007	J1	18	2nd	46,667	Quarter-final	Round of 16	Runners-up	Winners	A3	3rd place
2007	J1	18	2nd	46,667	Quarter-final	Round of 16	Runners-up	Winners	FIFA CWC	3rd place
2008	J1	18	7th	47,609	Group stage	5th round	–	Semi-finals	–	
2009	J1	18	6th	44,210	Quarter-final	2nd round	–	–	–	
2010	J1	18	10th	39,941	Group stage	Quarter-final	–	–	–	
2011	J1	18	15th	33,910	Runners-up	Quarter-final	–	–	–	
2012	J1	18	3rd	36,634	Group stage	Round of 16	–	–	–	
2013	J1	18	6th	37,100	Runners-up	3rd round	–	Group stage	–	
2014	J1	18	2nd	35,516	Quarter-final	3rd round	–	–	–	
2015	J1	18	3rd	38,745	Quarter-final	Runners-up		Group stage	–	
2016	J1	18	2nd	36,935	Winners	Round of 16	–	Round of 16	–	
2017	J1	18	7th	33,542	Quarter-final	Round of 16	Runners-up	Winners	Suruga	Winners
2017	J1	18	7th	33,542	Quarter-final	Round of 16	Runners-up	Winners	FIFA CWC	5th place
2018	J1	18	5th	34,798	Play-off stage	Winners	–			
2019	J1	18	14th	34,184	Quarter-final	Round of 16	Runners-up		–	
2020 †	J1	18	10th	7,869	Group stage	Did not qualify	–			
2021 †	J1	20	6th	8,244	Semi-final	Winners	–			
2022	J1	18	9th	23,617	Semi-final	3rd round	Winners		–	
2023	J1	18	4th	30,509	Runners-up	Round of 16	–	Group stage	FIFA CWC	4th Place
2024	J1	20	13th	37,519	Group stage	Banned				
2025	J1	20	7th	37,350	Play-off stage	Quarter-final			FIFA CWC	Group stage
2026	J1	10	TBD		N/A	N/A				
2026-27	J1	20	TBD		TBD	TBD				

Key

- Pos. = Position in league
- Attendance/G = Average home league attendance
- † 2020, 2021 seasons attendance reduced by COVID-19 worldwide pandemic

== League history ==
Excepting two seasons in which they were in the second tier, Mitsubishi/Urawa has always competed in the top flight, thereby being the club with the most top flight seasons total.

- Mitsubishi (Amateur era)
  - Division 1 (JSL and JSL Div.1): 1965–66, 1988–89
  - Division 2 (JSL Div.2): 1989–90
  - Division 1 (JSL Div.1): 1990–91, 1991–92
- Urawa Red Diamonds (Professional era)
  - Division 1 (J.League): 1993–99
  - Division 2 (J.League Div.2): 2000
  - Division 1 (J.League Div.1): 2001–
- Top scorer: Masahiro Fukuda with 152 goals

== Notes ==
Sporting positions
Preceded by Jeonbuk Hyundai Motors (South Korea)	Champions of Asia; 2007	Succeeded by Gamba Osaka (Japan)
Preceded by Jeonbuk Hyundai Motors (South Korea)	Champions of Asia; 2017	Succeeded by Kashima Antlers (Japan)
