= 1983 Japanese Super Cup =

Mitsubishi Motors	Yamaha Motors
3	0
- Date: March 27, 1983
- Venue: National Stadium, Tokyo

1983 Japanese Super Cup was the Japanese Super Cup competition. The match was played at National Stadium in Tokyo on March 27, 1983. Mitsubishi Motors won the championship.

== Match details ==
March 27, 1983

Mitsubishi Motors	3–0	Yamaha Motors

National Stadium
