= Kashima Antlers =

Association football club in Japan

Kashima Antlers 鹿島アントラーズ
- Full name: Kashima Antlers Co., Ltd.
- Short name: ANT
- Founded: 1947; 79 years ago as Sumitomo Metal FC
- Ground: Kashima Soccer Stadium
- Capacity: 40,728
- Owner: Mercari
- Chairman: Fumiaki Koizumi
- Manager: Toru Oniki
- League: J1 League
- 2026: J1 League, 2nd of 20
- Website: www.antlers.co.jp/en
Home colours	Away colours

The Kashima Antlers (鹿島アントラーズ, Kashima Antorāzu) are a professional football club based in Kashima, Ibaraki, Japan. They currently play in the J1 League, the top tier of Japanese professional football leagues. The club has financial backing from Mercari, a Japanese e-commerce company.

Since the J.League's creation and introduction of professional Japanese football in 1993, Kashima have proven themselves to be by far Japan's most successful football club in terms of trophies won, having won the J1 League title a record 9 times, the J.League Cup a record 6 times, the Emperor's Cup 5 times and the Japanese Super Cup a record 6 times for an unprecedented twenty (20) major domestic titles. Continentally, Kashima became Asian champions when they won the AFC Champions League in 2018. The club also won the J.League Cup / Copa Sudamericana Championship on 2 occasions in 2012 and 2013.

Internationally, Kashima has made two appearances in the FIFA Club World Cup where in the 2016 edition, the club qualified as the host of the tournament. Kashima notably became the only club to qualify from the first round until the final where they would go on to lose to 2015–16 UEFA Champions League winners, Real Madrid 4–2 after extra time with Gaku Shibasaki scoring both goals for Kashima.

Kashima are also one of only two clubs to have competed in Japan's top flight football every year since it was professionalized (the other being Yokohama F. Marinos, who has been playing in the top flight since 1982).

== History ==
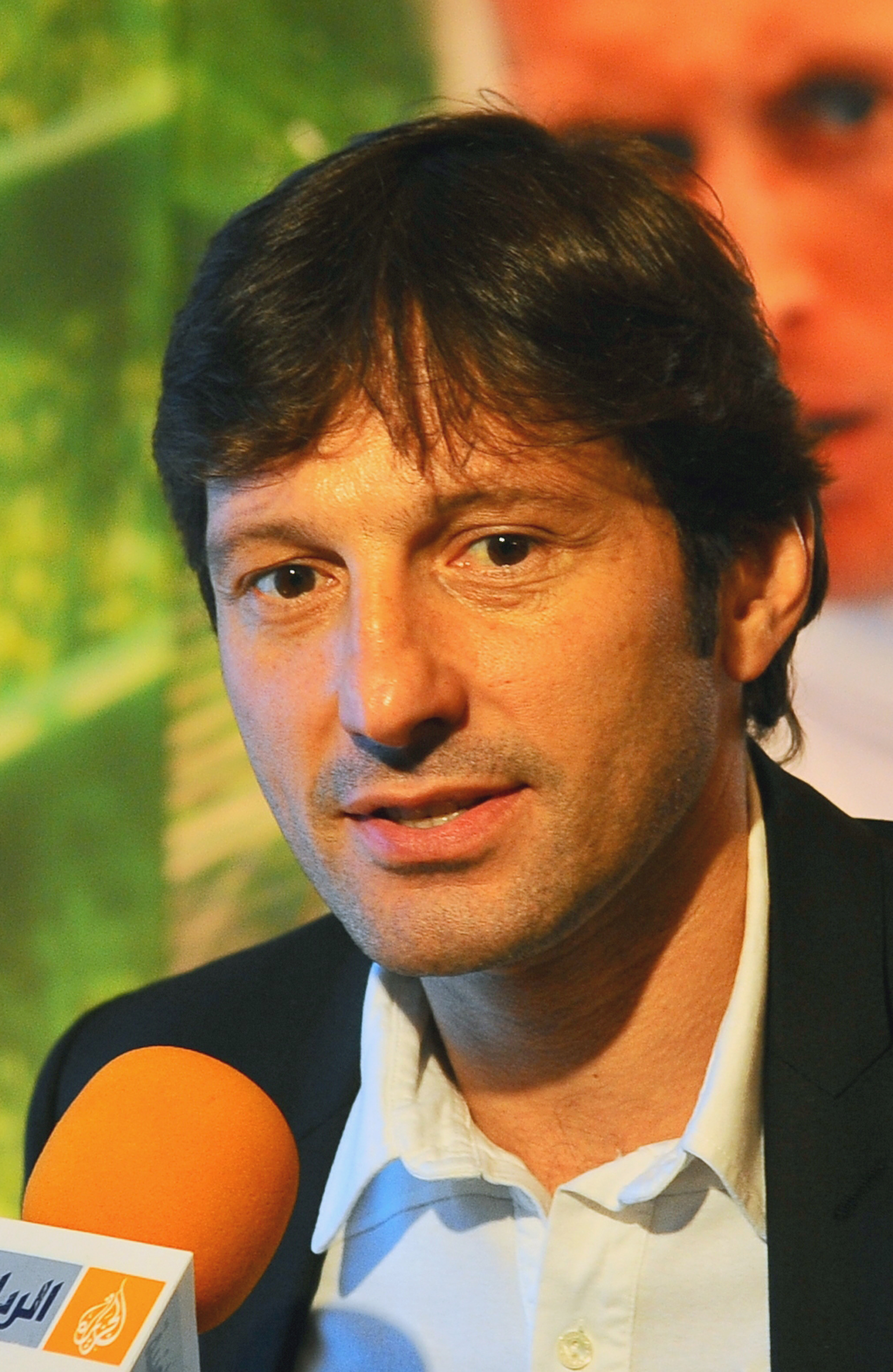
Leonardo Araújo played for Kashima from 1994 to 1996.

Founded in 1947 as Sumitomo Metal Industries Factory Football Club in Osaka and moved to Kashima, Ibaraki in 1975. It played in the semi-professional Japan Soccer League (JSL). They were promoted to the JSL's top flight in 1984, but never made much of an impact, going down in 1985–86 , returning in 1986–87 and going down again in 1988–89. Its last standing in the JSL was 2nd in the Second Division for 1991–92. In October 1991, Kashima Antlers Co., Ltd. was established with investment from 43 companies (at the time) from 5 local governments.

After the formation of the fully professional J.League, Sumitomo, like all other clubs, stripped the corporate brand from the club's name and reformed as the Kashima Antlers in April 1992. Kashima was essentially promoted to the new top flight, as many JSL First Division clubs decided to relegate themselves being unprepared for professionalism. (Of the original 10 (Note: The Original Ten of the J.League in 1992 were Kashima Antlers, Urawa Red Diamonds, JEF United Ichihara, Verdy Kawasaki, Yokohama Marinos, Yokohama Flügels, Shimizu S-Pulse, Nagoya Grampus Eight, Gamba Osaka and Sanfrecce Hiroshima.) J.League founding member clubs, Kashima and Shimizu S-Pulse were newly promoted. Ironically, Kashima had defeated a forerunner of Shimizu's, Nippon Light Metal/Hagoromo Club, to earn its JSL Second Division place back in 1974).

=== Domestic treble and back-to-back league champions (1996–2002) ===
Since the J.League's creation and introduction of professional Japanese football in 1993, Kashima Antlers have consistently been amongst the strongest clubs in the country, holding several distinctions and records. Led by former Brazil national team star and Japan national team coach Zico in the club's formative years, Kashima Antlers were the first club to win a J.League stage, claiming the 1st stage of the inaugural season in 1993. In 1996, Kashima Antlers won their first ever league title in the first division, However, in 1997, they failed to defend their league title where they ended up as runners-up in the league after losing to Júbilo Iwata 4–2 on aggregate in the Suntory Championship. However, Kashima Antlers went on to win the Emperor's Cup, Japanese Super Cup and J.League Cup in the same year. In 1998, Kashima Antlers went on to win the league title again.

In 2000 Kashima became the first J.League club to achieve the "treble", by winning all three major titles: J.League, J.League Cup, and Emperor's Cup.

=== Three peats champions and rise of Kashima Antlers (2007–2019) ===
In recent times, by clinching the 2007 season league title, Kashima Antlers became the first and only club in Japan to have won ten domestic titles in the professional era. In 2008, Kashima Antlers became the first and only club to successfully defend the league titles on two occasions. In 2009, Kashima Antlers became the first and only club to win three consecutive J.League titles. With victories in back to back J.League Cups in 2011, 2012 and most recently followed by their 2015 victory, Kashima extended their unmatched record of major domestic titles in the professional era to seventeen.

To this day, Kashima has maintained strong ties with the football community in Brazil, a fact borne out of Zico's past affiliation with the club. Kashima's Brazilian connection has manifested itself in both the club's player transfer and coaching policy resulting in only three non-Brazilian foreign players and predominantly Brazilian managers signing for Kashima since the inception of the J.League.

The population of Kashima city is a mere 60,000 and for that reason club has also adopted the surrounding cities of Itako, Kamisu, Namegata and Hokota as its official hometowns, all in Ibaraki Prefecture. The combined population of five cities is 280,000. Antlers home games are played at Kashima Soccer Stadium, one of the 2002 FIFA World Cup venues with capacity of 40,000.

==== FIFA Club World Cup debut ====
During the 2016 FIFA Club World Cup, Kashima became the first Asian club to reach the FIFA Club World Cup final and notably became the only club to qualify from the first round until the final following a 3–0 victory over the 2016 Copa Libertadores champions, Atlético Nacional. In the 2016 FIFA Club World Cup Final, Kashima faced off against European champions Real Madrid. Gaku Shibasaki notably scored a brace in the match to put Kashima 2–1 up before Cristiano Ronaldo converted a penalty to level the match at 2–2. After 90 minutes, Kashima were beaten 4–2 after extra time.

==== AFC Champions League champions ====
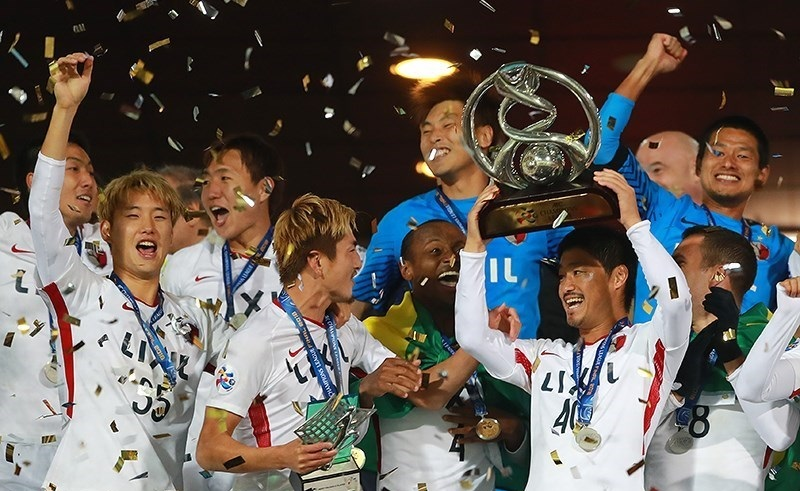
Kashima Antlers celebrate after winning the 2018 AFC Champions League at the Azadi Stadium vs Persepolis

In 2017, Kashima finished the J1 League season as runners-up which sees the club qualified to the 2018 AFC Champions League where they were drawn in Group H alongside Korean club Suwon Samsung Bluewings, Australian club Sydney FC and Chinese club Shanghai Shenhua, Kashima went on to finished as group runners-up with 9 points sitting 1 points below group leaders Suwon Samsung Bluewings thus advancing to the round of 16. In the round of 16, Kashima faced off against Chinese club Shanghai SIPG where they won on a narrow 4–3 margin on aggregate thus advancing to the quarter-finals. In the quarter-finals, they faced off against another Chinese club Tianjin Quanjian where Kashima easily won 5–0 on aggregate seeing themselves qualified to the semi-finals facing against Suwon Samsung Bluewings again. Kashima survived the semi-finals with a 6–5 win on aggregate qualifying to the final where they would face West opposition Persepolis from Iran. Kashima Antlers won 2–0 on aggregate in the 2018 AFC Champions League final thus lifting the trophy at the Azadi Stadium in Tehran. With Kashima Antlers winning their first continental trophy, they earned the right to represent the AFC at the 2018 FIFA Club World Cup facing off against the 2018 CONCACAF Champions League winners Guadalajara where Kashima won them 3–2 to advance to the semi-finals to face off against European champions Real Madrid. However, Kashima suffered a 3–1 lost to the eventual champions where Gareth Bale scored a hat-trick in the match thus seeing Kashima playing in the third place match against 2018 Copa Libertadores champions but was beaten 4–0.

=== Stagnation (2020–2024) ===
The period between 2020 and 2024 represented a transitional era for the Kashima Antlers as the club struggled to return to the dominance that had defined much of its modern history. Following their last J1 League title in 2016 and the continental triumph in the 2018 AFC Champions League, Kashima entered the early 2020s amid managerial changes, squad rebuilding, and increasing competition within Japanese football. Although the club remained competitive domestically, they were unable to secure major silverware during this period.

The 2020 season marked the beginning of the Kashima rebuilding phase. Under Brazilian head coach Antônio Carlos Zago at the start of the campaign, Kashima struggled for consistency and spent the early part of the season near the bottom of the table before improving later in the year. Zago was replaced by Naoki Soma during the campaign as the club sought to stabilize performances until the end of the season. Despite the difficult start, Kashima recovered strongly in the second half of the season and eventually finished fifth in the J1 League with 18 wins, 5 draws and 11 losses, scoring 55 goals. Brazilian forward Everaldo emerged as the team's top scorer, while young players such as Ryōtarō Araki began establishing themselves in the first team.

In 2021, Kashima continued to remain among the upper ranks of the league but struggled to mount a sustained title challenge. The season saw the emergence of several young talents, most notably Araki, who recorded double-digit goal contributions and became one of the league's most promising attacking midfielders.

The 2022 campaign brought renewed optimism with the return of striker Yuma Suzuki who had a three years spelled with Belgium club Sint-Truiden. Kashima started the season strongly and briefly led the league standings during the first half of the campaign. However, inconsistent results in the latter stages saw them fall away from the title race, eventually finishing outside the championship positions once again.

The 2023 season saw further squad changes as the club attempted to rejuvenate its roster with a mix of returning veterans and developing academy products. Gaku Shibasaki returned to Kashima after nearly seven years away after several seasons in Europe, symbolizing the club's attempt to combine experience with youth development. Although Kashima remained competitive in the J1 League, they again failed to secure a major domestic trophy. Nonetheless, the team continued to maintain consistent league finishes in the upper half of the table, reflecting a level of stability even during a relatively trophyless period.

In the 2024 season, Kashima were still regarded as one of the strongest sides in Japan, despite their prolonged wait for another league championship. The club remained in contention near the top of the table for much of the season, however, Kashima title drought persisted.

=== Return to glory (2025–present) ===
The 2025 season marked the end of Kashima prolonged trophy drought and the beginning of a new successful era for the club. After several seasons of rebuilding and near-misses in the early 2020s, Kashima returned to the summit by winning the 2025 J1 League title, securing their first league title since 2016 and a record-extending ninth top-flight championship. Ahead of the season, the club appointed Toru Oniki as manager in December 2024. Oniki, who had previously achieved major success, was tasked with restoring Kashima's competitive edge and guiding a squad that blended experienced players with emerging talents. The season was also highlighted by the attacking form of Brazilian forward Léo Ceará, who would later finish as the league's top scorer with 21 goals.Kashima's campaign was not without difficulties. The team endured inconsistent periods, including several winless streaks, while injuries to key players such as Ikuma Sekigawa, Koki Anzai and Shu Morooka forced the squad to adapt throughout the season. Despite these setbacks, Kashima remained in the title race, showing defensive solidity and resilience in the latter stages of the campaign. Notably, the club conceded only four goals in their final ten matches of the league season, helping them maintain their position near the top of the standings.

The title race ultimately went down to the final matchday, with Kashiwa Reysol closely trailing Kashima in the standings. On 6 December 2025, Kashima secured the championship with a 2–1 home victory over Yokohama F. Marinos. Léo Ceará scored twice to give Kashima a decisive lead, ensuring the club clinched the title by a narrow margin of one point. The triumph ended a nine-year wait for a J1 League title and represented the club's first major trophy since winning the 2018 AFC Champions League and also a return to the 2026–27 AFC Champions League Elite. It also reinforced Kashima’ status as the most successful club in J.League history, extending their record to nine league championships. Beyond the domestic league, Kashima reached the quarter-finals of the 2025 Emperor's Cup and competed in the J.League Cup, though the league title remained the defining achievement of the season. The victory marked the culmination of the rebuilding process that began earlier in the decade and signaled the club's return as a dominant force in Japanese football.

== Team image ==
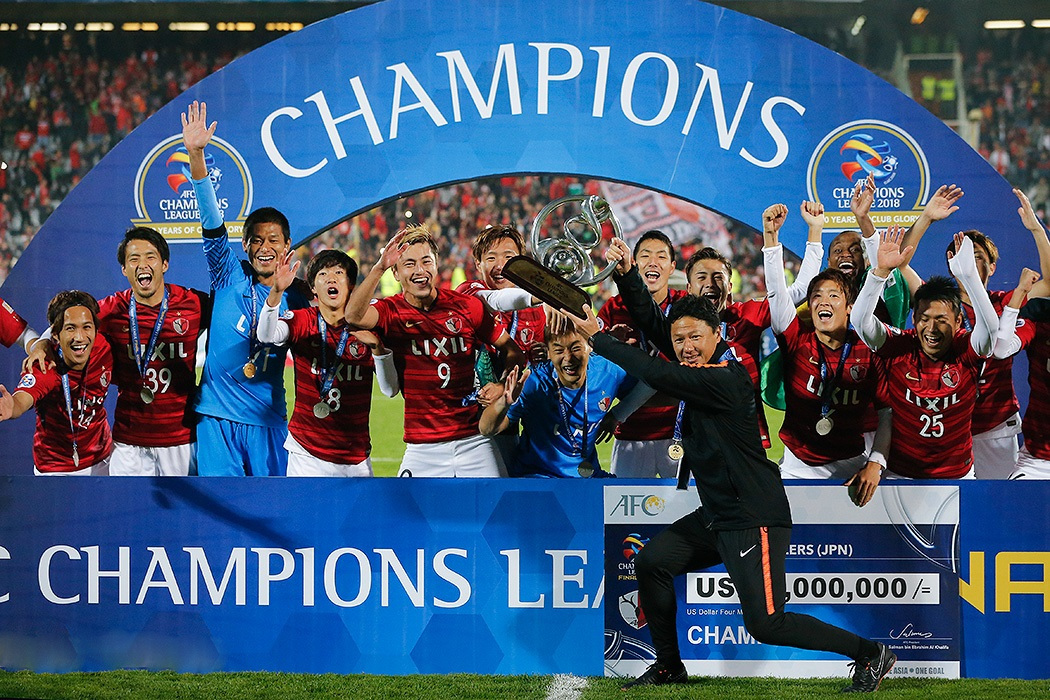
2018 AFC Champions League champions

=== Name origin ===
The name 'Antlers' is derived from the city of Kashima (Japanese: 鹿嶋, lit. 'Deer Island').

The club crest not only resembles deer antlers but it also reflects the image of a rose thorn as it is the official flower of Ibaraki, the home prefecture of the club. Deer are amiable animals and are viewed in some religions as spiritual messengers.

In fact, Kashima Shrine, one of the most famous shrines in Japan and located in close proximity to the club headquarters, has kept and raised deer for more than 1,300 years as a spiritual symbol.

=== International affiliation ===
In 2017, Kashima established a base in New York where the club main objective is to investigate and apply advanced cases from the digital domain of the Major League Soccer while there are also opportunities to gather information in terms of player management and competition factors. Another reason comes in the form of establishing relationships to learn international strategy directly from the likes of FC Barcelona and Bayern Munich. The relationship building hasn't solely been with European clubs, and for the past two years regular meetings have been held at the head offices of MLS in order to deepen ties with the league and its clubs.

=== Slogans ===
- 1998: CHALLENGE
- 1999: NEXT
- 2000: Glory Again – Challenge from the Beginning (原点からの挑戦 )
- 2001: Antlersism – Doctrine of Victory – FOR NEXT 10 YEARS (勝利主義 )
- 2002: Antlersism – Evolution – STAIRWAY TO THE WORLD (進化 )
- 2003: OVER'03 – From Kashima to Asia, then to the World (カシマからアジア、そして世界へ)
- 2004: FOOTBALL DREAM 2004 – Take the Crown 10 (奪冠)
- 2005:FOOTBALL DREAM 2005 – Declaration of Counter-Attack (反撃宣言)
- 2006: FOOTBALL DREAM 2006 – Brand New Conquest (新制覇)
- 2007: FOOTBALL DREAM 2007 – Spirits (魂)
- 2008: FOOTBALL DREAM 2008 – DESAFIO (挑戦 )
- 2009: FOOTBALL DREAM 2009 – PROGRESSO (飛躍)
- 2010: FOOTBALL DREAM 2010 – Evolução (新化)
- 2011: FOOTBALL DREAM NEXT
- 2012: SMILE AGAIN with PRIDE
- 2013: RENASCIMENTO – Rebirth – Carrying Pride in Our Hearts (誇りを胸に)
- 2014: SPECTACLE – Battle (戦 )
- 2015: RISE TO THE CHALLENGE – Ready (覚悟 )
- 2016:FOOTBALL DREAM – Together (ともに)
- 2017: FOOTBALL DREAM – Connected (つなぐ)
- 2018: FOOTBALL DREAM – Surpassing (こえる)
- 2019: FOOTBALL DREAM – Changing (かわる)
- 2020: FOOTBALL DREAM – On Display(みせる)
- 2021: FOOTBALL DREAM – Evolution (しんか)
- 2022: FOOTBALL DREAM – Challenge (いどむ)
- 2023: FOOTBALL DREAM – Be the One (ひとつに)
- 2024: FOOTBALL DREAM – Hang on (かける)
- 2025–2026: FOOTBALL DREAM – ONE
- 2026–2027: FOOTBALL DREAM – Fight Together (共闘)

== Stadium ==
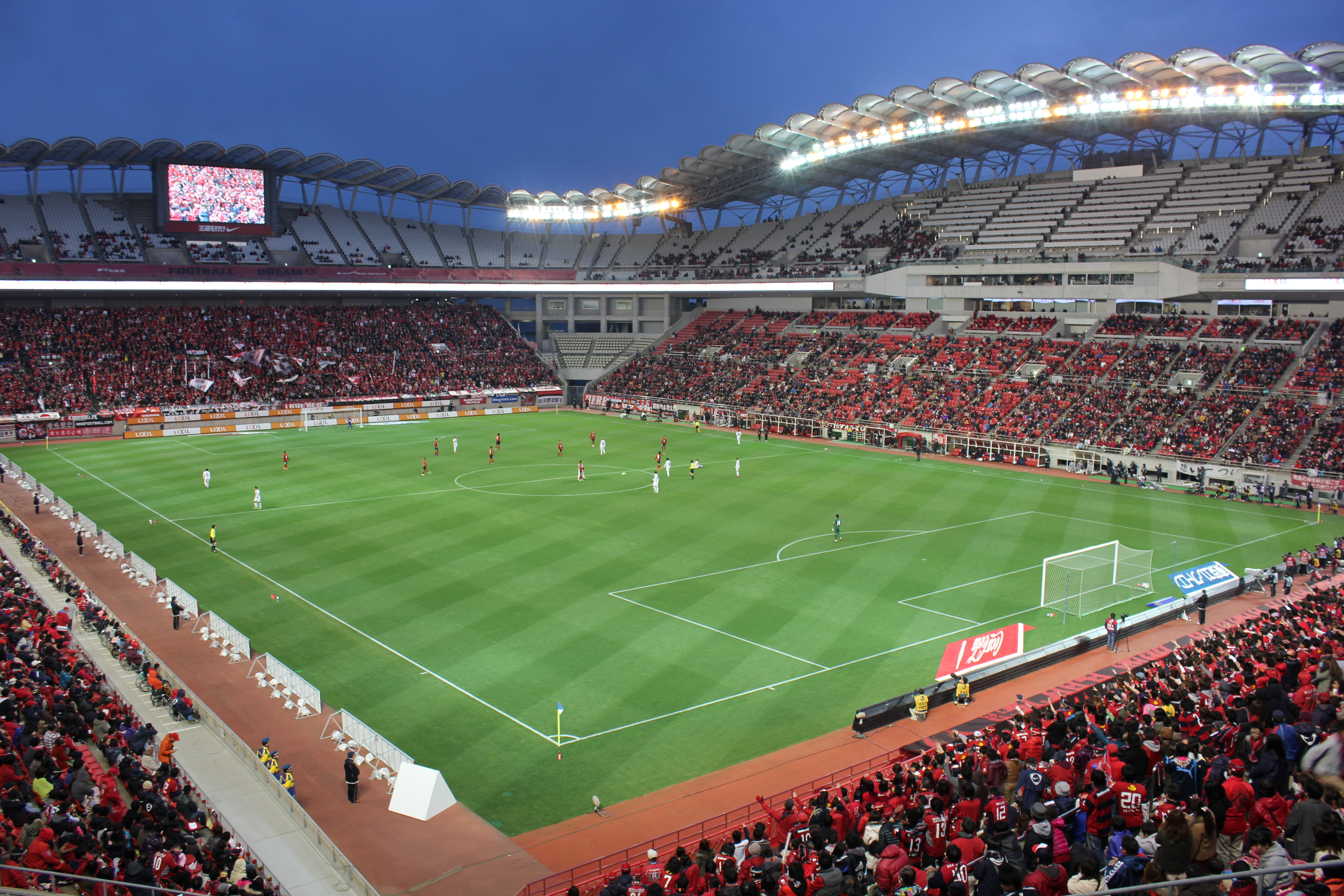
Kashima Soccer Stadium

Kashima Soccer Stadium has been the home ground of Kashima since 26 March 1993. The Kashima Soccer Museum, opened in 2004 is set for wide-scale renewal, while the Wellness Plaza, established in 2006, is also in line for similar improvements, including the installation of a public bath. There is a real awareness of furthering stadium use on non-matchdays to ensure Kashima Stadium is a hub for the local region. On the other hand, the importance of Kashima Stadium as a sacred football ground will also increase. The stadium was selected as a host venue for the 2020 Tokyo Olympics, where it hosted international competition for the first time since the 2002 FIFA World Cup. Ahead of that, the stadium will also host the Ibaraki National Sports Festival this year, at which athletes will gather from all over the country.

In 2008, a 500-metre LED wraparound advertising board, the longest in Asia, was installed at the front of the second tier. In 2017, the latest large electronic screens were added to both the north and south stands as part of the commitment to improving the viewing environment for visitors.

== Kit suppliers and shirt sponsors ==
=== Sponsors ===
Year	Kit manufacturer	Main sponsor
1990–1992	(Germany) Adidas	No sponsors
1993–1995	(Japan) Mizuno (League matches) (Japan) Ennerre (Emperor's Cup matches)	No sponsors
1996	(Japan) Mizuno (League matches) (Japan) Ennerre (Emperor's Cup matches)	(Japan) Tostem
1997	(United Kingdom) Umbro	(Japan) Tostem
1998–2001	(Japan) Ennerre	(Japan) Tostem
2002–2010	(United States) Nike	(Japan) Tostem
2011–present	(United States) Nike	(Japan) Lixil

=== Kit evolution ===
Home kits
1992	1993–1994	1995–1996	1997	1998–1999
2000-2001	2002-2003	2004-2005	2006-2007	2008–2009
2010	2011	2012	2013	2014
2015	2016	2017	2018	2019
2020	2021	2022	2023	2024
2025	2026 -			

Away kits
1992	1993–1994	1995–1996	1997	1998–1999
2000–2001	2002–2003	2004–2005	2006–2007	2008–2009
2010	2011	2012	2013	2014
2015	2016	2017	2018	2019
2020	2021	2022	2023	2024
2025

Alternative kits
1995 3rd	2008–2009 3rd 2009 ACL	2012 3rd	2017 3rd	2019 3rd
2021 3rd	2024; Friendly Match against Brighton			

== Players ==
=== First-team squad ===
As of 29 October 2026.

Note: Flags indicate national team as defined under FIFA eligibility rules; some limited exceptions apply. Players may hold more than one non-FIFA nationality.

No.	Pos.	Nation	Player
1	GK	JPN	Tomoki Hayakawa
2	DF	JPN	Koki Anzai
3	DF	KOR	Kim Tae-hyeon
4	DF	JPN	Kaito Chida
5	DF	JPN	Ikuma Sekigawa (vice-captain)
6	MF	JPN	Kento Misao
7	DF	JPN	Ryoya Ogawa
8	MF	BRA	Matheus Bueno
9	FW	BRA	Léo Ceará (vice-captain)
10	MF	JPN	Gaku Shibasaki (captain)
11	FW	JPN	Kyosuke Tagawa
14	MF	JPN	Yuta Higuchi
17	FW	BRA	Élber
18	FW	BRA	Yan Matheus
19	DF	JPN	Sho Omori
21	GK	JPN	Taiki Yamada
23	DF	JPN	Keisuke Tsukui
24	MF	JPN	Haruki Hayashi
25	DF	JPN	Ryuta Koike

No.	Pos.	Nation	Player
27	MF	JPN	Yūta Matsumura
28	DF	JPN	Yugo Okawa
29	GK	JPN	Yuji Kajikawa
30	FW	JPN	Minato Yoshida
31	GK	JPN	Haruto Fujii
32	DF	JPN	Haruto Matsumoto
34	FW	JPN	Homare Tokuda
35	DF	JPN	Anthony Udemba Motosuna
37	DF	JPN	Rikuto Hirose
40	FW	JPN	Yuma Suzuki (vice-captain)
42	MF	JPN	Rui Onuki ^{Type 2}
43	MF	JPN	Yuwa Fukuoka ^{Type 2}
44	MF	JPN	Daigo Hirashima ^{Type 2}
45	DF	JPN	Koki Kurahashi ^{Type 2}
46	MF	JPN	Sora Iwatsuchi ^{Type 2}
47	FW	JPN	Eito Takaki ^{Type 2}
48	FW	JPN	Shu Takisawa ^{Type 2}
55	DF	JPN	Naomichi Ueda (vice-captain)
77	FW	SVK	Aleksandar Čavrić

=== Out on loan ===
Note: Flags indicate national team as defined under FIFA eligibility rules; some limited exceptions apply. Players may hold more than one non-FIFA nationality.

No.	Pos.	Nation	Player
—	DF	JPN	Mihiro Sato (on loan at Albirex Niigata)
—	DF	JPN	Shuhei Mizoguchi (on loan at Tokyo Verdy)

No.	Pos.	Nation	Player
—	MF	JPN	Yoshihiro Shimoda (on loan at Kochi United SC)
—	MF	JPN	Yu Funabashi (on loan at Mito HollyHock)

=== Kashima Antlers Youth ===
As of 16 April 2026

Below are list of U-18 team players belong to Kashima Antlers Youth team that compete in 2026 Prince Takamado U-18 Premier League, the top-flight league for U-18 team of football clubs and senior high school football teams in the country. Only registered players for the competition will be displayed.

Note: Flags indicate national team as defined under FIFA eligibility rules; some limited exceptions apply. Players may hold more than one non-FIFA nationality.

No.	Pos.	Nation	Player
1	GK	JPN	Shota Arakaki
2	DF	JPN	Kanta Hayashi
3	DF	JPN	Anthony Udemba Motosuna *
4	DF	JPN	Koki Kurahashi
5	DF	JPN	Ayato Yonekawa
6	MF	JPN	Rui Onuki (captain) **
7	MF	JPN	Ryua Oshima
8	FW	JPN	Jigen Monoi
9	FW	JPN	Kuga Doi
10	MF	JPN	Daigo Hirashima (vice-captain) **
11	FW	JPN	Shu Takisawa
13	FW	JPN	Eito Takaki
14	MF	JPN	Sora Iwatsuchi
15	MF	JPN	Ritsuki Miyoshi
16	MF	JPN	Yuwa Fukuoka **
17	FW	JPN	Tomoya Ishiwatari
18	FW	JPN	Tsukamu Kato
19	MF	JPN	Haruto Takagi
20	MF	JPN	Hiro Ogasawara
21	GK	JPN	Kosei Oshita
22	DF	JPN	Yuto Kumazawa

No.	Pos.	Nation	Player
23	MF	JPN	Haruto Kuwana
24	MF	JPN	Kippei Terao
25	MF	JPN	Teru Sogahata
26	MF	JPN	Reon Kakinuma
27	MF	JPN	Gemma Koeda
28	DF	JPN	Shuto Ueno
29	GK	JPN	Leo Fujita
30	MF	JPN	Yuta Hoteida
31	GK	JPN	Kento Schuldt
32	DF	JPN	Kairi Nakajima
33	FW	JPN	Ryoma Fukuda
34	FW	JPN	Soma Iida
35	MF	JPN	Itsuki Tojo
36	FW	JPN	Rio Kumagai
37	FW	JPN	Junpei Mito
38	DF	JPN	Touma Takata
39	FW	JPN	Haruto Kanari
40	FW	JPN	Minato Yoshida *
41	GK	JPN	Toma Misaki
42	MF	JPN	Ayumu Ishida
43	MF	JPN	Toa Sugiyama

Players marked with * (Single asterisk) already registered as full time members of the first team. Players marked with ** (Double asterisks) set to become full-time members of the first team beginning January 2027. As of 20 August 2026, they are registered as type 2 players.

== Management and staff ==
Position	Name
Technical advisor	(Brazil) Zico
Manager	(Japan) Toru Oniki
Assistant manager	(Japan) Masaki Chugo (Japan) Atsushi Yanagisawa (Japan) Makoto Tanaka
Goalkeeping coach	(Japan) Hitoshi Sogahata
Technical staff	(Japan) Suguru Arie (Japan) Tomofumi Kuriyama
Physical coach	(Japan) Ryosuke Ito
Conditioning coach	(Japan) Hiroyuki Furuta
Physiotherapists	(Japan) Yoshihiko Nakagawa (Japan) Atsushi Inaba
Athletic trainers	(Japan) Toshihiro Hashimoto (Japan) Kenichi Nakata (Japan) Tsukasa Ohashi
Interpreters	(Japan) Kenta Kasai (Japan) Kentaro Seki (Japan) Masaya Kawakubo (South Korea) Kim Young-ha
Competent	(Japan) Yuji Takada
Side affairs	(Japan) Keisuke Okawa (Japan) Shinpei Okiji
Dietitian	(Japan) Aya Ishibashi
Team doctors	(Japan) Hiroshi Jonouchi (Japan) Jun Seki (Japan) Ryo Matsunaga (Japan) Takashi Sando (Japan) Tomoo Ishii (Japan) Toshiaki Nagamine (Japan) Hiroshi Kimura

== Honours ==
As both Sumitomo Metal (1947–1991) and Kashima Antlers (1991–present)

Type	Honours	Titles	Season
League	J1 League	9	1996, 1998, 2000, 2001, 2007, 2008, 2009, 2016, 2025
League	Japan Soccer League Division 2	2	1984, 1986–87
Cup	Emperor's Cup	5	1997, 2000, 2007, 2010, 2016
Cup	J.League Cup	6	1997, 2000, 2002, 2011, 2012, 2015
Cup	Japanese Super Cup	6	1997, 1998, 1999, 2009, 2010, 2017
Cup	All Japan Senior Football Championship	1	1973
Continental	AFC Champions League	1	2018
Regional	J.League Cup / Copa Sudamericana Championship	2	2012, 2013
Regional	A3 Champions Cup	1	2003

Bold is for those competition that are currently active.

== Records and statistics ==
As of 26 March 2026.

Top 10 all-time appearances
Rank	Player	Years	Club appearance
1	(Japan) Hitoshi Sogahata	1998–2020	744
2	(Japan) Mitsuo Ogasawara	1998–2018	724
3	(Japan) Takeshi Aoki	2001–2016	531
4	(Japan) Masashi Motoyama	1998–2015	496
5	(Japan) Shoma Doi	2011–2024	464
6	(Japan) Yasushi Endo	2007–2022	444
7	(Japan) Yasuto Honda	1992–2006	431
8	(Japan) Yutaka Akita	1993–2003	411
9	(Japan) Takuya Nozawa	1999–2011, 2013–2014	410
10	(Japan) Daiki Iwamasa	2004–2013	398

Top 10 all-time goalscorer
Rank	Player	Club appearance	Total goals
1	(Japan) Yoshiyuki Hasegawa	365	120
2	(Japan) Yuma Suzuki	327	106
3	(Japan) Atsushi Yanagisawa	290	98
4	(Japan) Mitsuo Ogasawara	724	87
5	(Japan) Takuya Nozawa	410	86
6	(Brazil) Marquinhos	167	82
7	(Japan) Shoma Doi	464	75
8	(Japan) Shinzō Kōroki	283	71
9	(Japan) Yasushi Endo	444	70
10	(Brazil) Mazinho	191	65

- Biggest wins: 16–0 vs (Maldives) Club Valencia (23 October 1999)
- Heaviest defeats: 0–8 vs Shonan Bellmare (10 December 1980)
- Youngest ever debutant: Minato Yoshida ~ 16 years 9 months 14 days old (On 29 April 2025 vs Yokohama FC)
- Oldest ever player: (Brazil) Zico ~ 41 years 3 months 12 days old (On 15 June 1994 vs Júbilo Iwata)
- Youngest goal scorers: Homare Tokuda ~ 17 years 6 months 27 days old (On 14 September 2024 vs Sanfrecce Hiroshima)
- Oldest goal scorers: (Brazil) Zico ~ 41 years 3 months 12 days old (On 15 June 1994 vs Júbilo Iwata)

== Award winners ==
As of the end of the 2025 season.

- J.League Player of the Year:

- (Brazil) Jorginho (1996)
- (Brazil) Marquinhos (2008)
- (Japan) Mitsuo Ogasawara (2009)
- (Japan) Tomoki Hayakawa (2025)

- J.League Top Scorer:

- (Brazil) Marquinhos (2008)

- J.League Best XI:

- (Brazil) Santos (1993)
- (Japan) Shunzo Ono (1993)
- (Japan) Yasuto Honda (1993)
- (Japan) Naoki Soma (1995, 1996, 1997, 1998)
- (Brazil) Jorginho (1996)
- (Brazil) Bismarck (1997)
- (Japan) Yutaka Akita (1997, 1998, 2000)
- (Japan) Atsushi Yanagisawa (1998, 2001)
- (Japan) Daijiro Takakuwa (2000)
- (Japan) Akira Narahashi (2001)
- (Japan) Mitsuo Ogasawara (2001, 2002, 2003, 2004, 2005, 2009)
- (Japan) Kōji Nakata (2001)
- (Japan) Hitoshi Sogahata (2002)
- (Japan) Daiki Iwamasa (2007, 2008, 2009)
- (Brazil) Marquinhos (2008)
- (Japan) Atsuto Uchida (2008, 2009)
- (Japan) Yuya Osako (2013)
- (Japan) Gaku Shibasaki (2014)
- (Japan) Mu Kanazaki (2015)
- (Japan) Gen Shoji (2016, 2017)
- (Japan) Daigo Nishi (2017, 2018)
- (Brazil) Everaldo (2020)
- (Japan) Kei Chinen (2024)
- (Japan) Tomoki Hayakawa (2025)
- (Japan) Naomichi Ueda (2025)
- (Brazil) Léo Ceará (2025)

- J.League Best Young Player:

- (Japan) Atsushi Yanagisawa (1997)
- (Japan) Gaku Shibasaki (2012)
- (Brazil) Caio (2014)
- (Japan) Ryōtarō Araki (2021)

- J.League Goal of the Year:

- (Japan) Daigo Nishi against Sanfrecce Hiroshima (19 July 2014)
- (Brazil) Léo Ceará against Kashiwa Reysol (25 July 2025)

- J.League Manager of the Year:

- (Brazil) João Carlos (1997)
- (Brazil) Oswaldo de Oliveira (2007, 2008, 2009)
- (Japan) Masatada Ishii (2016)

=== FIFA World Cup players ===
The following players have been selected by their country in the FIFA World Cup, while playing for Kashima Antlers:

- (Japan) Akira Narahashi (1998)
- (Japan) Naoki Soma (1998)
- (Japan) Yutaka Akita (1998, 2002)
- (Japan) Atsushi Yanagisawa (2002, 2006)
- (Japan) Hitoshi Sogahata (2002)
- (Japan) Kōji Nakata (2002)
- (Japan) Mitsuo Ogasawara (2002, 2006)
- (Japan) Takayuki Suzuki (2002)
- (Japan) Atsuto Uchida (2010)
- (Japan) Daiki Iwamasa (2010)
- (South Korea) Lee Jung-soo (2010)
- (Japan) Gen Shoji (2018)
- (Japan) Naomichi Ueda (2018)

=== Olympic players ===
The following players have represented their country at the Summer Olympic Games whilst playing for Kashima Antlers:

- (Japan) Atsushi Yanagisawa (2000)
- (Japan) Kōji Nakata (2000)
- (Japan) Masashi Motoyama (2000)
- (Japan) Tomoyuki Hirase (2000)
- (Japan) Hitoshi Sogahata (2004)
- (Japan) Atsuto Uchida (2008)
- (Japan) Kazuya Yamamura (2012)
- (Japan) Naomichi Ueda (2016)
- (Japan) Ayase Ueda (2020)
- (Japan) Kōki Machida (2020)

== Notable players ==
As of 2026–27 season.

=== International capped players ===
AFC/OFC: (China) Serginho; (South Korea) Choi Sung-kuk; (South Korea) Hwang Seok-ho; (South Korea) Jung Seung-hyun; (South Korea) Kim Min-tae; (South Korea) Kim Tae-hyeon; (South Korea) Kwoun Sun-tae; (South Korea) Lee Jung-soo; (South Korea) Park Joo-ho; (United Arab Emirates) Caio Lucas	CAF: –NIL–	UEFA: (Serbia) Aleksandar Čavrić	CONMEBOL/ CONCACAF: (Brazil) Alcindo Sartori; (Brazil) Bebeto; (Brazil) Carlos Mozer; (Brazil) Bismarck; (Brazil) Euller; (Brazil) Fábio Júnior; (Brazil) Fábio Santos; (Brazil) Fellype Gabriel; (Brazil) Jorginho; (Brazil) Juninho; (Brazil) Leonardo Araújo; (Brazil) Léo Silva; (Brazil) Marcinho; (Brazil) Mazinho Oliveira; (Brazil) Regis; (Brazil) Ricardinho; (Brazil) Tartá; (Brazil) Zico

== Managerial history ==
Manager	Period	Honours
(Japan) Masakatsu Miyamoto	January 1992 – June 1994	
(Brazil) Edu	June 1994 – December 1995	
(Brazil) João Carlos	January 1996 – July 1998	– 1996 J.League – 1997 Emperor's Cup – 1997 J.League Cup – 1997 Japanese Super Cup – 1998 Japanese Super Cup
(Japan) Takashi Sekizuka (interim)	July 1998	
(Brazil) Zé Mário	July 1998 – August 1999	– 1998 J.League – 1999 Japanese Super Cup
(Japan) Takashi Sekizuka (interim) (2)	August 1999	
(Brazil) Zico (interim)	20 August 1999 – 31 December 1999	
(Brazil) Toninho Cerezo	1 January 2000 – 30 December 2005	– 2000 J1 League – 2000 Emperor's Cup – 2000 J.League Cup – 2001 J1 League – 2002 J.League Cup – 2003 A3 Champions Cup
(Brazil) Paulo Autuori	31 December 2005 – 29 November 2006	
(Brazil) Oswaldo de Oliveira	1 January 2007 – 31 December 2011	– 2007 J1 League – 2007 Emperor's Cup – 2008 J1 League – 2009 J1 League – 2009 Japanese Super Cup – 2010 Emperor's Cup – 2010 Japanese Super Cup – 2011 J.League Cup
(Brazil) Jorginho	1 January 2012 – 31 December 2012	– 2012 J.League Cup – 2012 J.League Cup / Copa Sudamericana Championship
(Brazil) Toninho Cerezo (2)	1 January 2013 – 22 July 2015	– 2013 J.League Cup / Copa Sudamericana Championship
(Japan) Masatada Ishii	23 July 2015 – 31 May 2017	– 2015 J.League Cup – 2016 J1 League – 2016 Emperor's Cup – 2017 Japanese Super Cup
(Japan) Go Oiwa	31 May 2017 – 1 January 2020	– 2018 AFC Champions League
(Brazil) Antônio Carlos Zago	2 January 2020 – 3 April 2021	
(Japan) Naoki Soma (interim)	7 April 2021 – December 2021	
(Switzerland) René Weiler	10 December 2021 – 7 August 2022	
(Japan) Daiki Iwamasa	8 August 2022 – 4 December 2023	
(Serbia) Ranko Popović	21 December 2023 – 6 October 2024	
(Japan) Masaki Chugo	9 October 2024 – 8 December 2024	
(Japan) Toru Oniki	12 December 2024 – present	– 2025 J1 League

== Season by season record ==
Champions	Runners-up	Third place	Promoted	Relegated

Season	Div.	Tms.	Pos.	Avg. Attd.	J.League Cup	Emperor's Cup	Super Cup	Asia		Others	
1992	–	–	–	–	Semi-finals	Quarter-finals	–	–	–	–	–
1993	J1	10	2nd	14,016	Group stage	Runners-up	–	–	–	–	–
1994	J1	12	3rd	16,812	1st round	1st round	–	–	–	–	–
1995	J1	14	7th	19,141	–	Semi-finals	–	–	–	–	–
1996	J1	16	1st	15,386	Group stage	Quarter-finals	–	–	–	–	–
1997	J1	17	2nd	16,985	Winner	Winner	Winner	–	–	–	–
1998	J1	18	1st	15,345	Semi-finals	Semi-finals	Winner	CC	Quarter-finals	–	–
1999	J1	16	9th	17,049	Runners-up	Round of 16	Winner	CWC	3rd place	–	–
2000	J1	16	1st	17,507	Winner	Winner	–	CC	Quarter-finals	–	–
2001	J1	16	1st	22,425	Semi-finals	Quarter-finals	Runners-up	–	–	–	–
2002	J1	16	4th	21,590	Winner	Runners-up	Runners-up	CC	Quarter-finals	–	–
2003	J1	16	5th	21,204	Runners-up	Semi-finals	–	CL	Group stage	A3	Winner
2004	J1	16	6th	17,585	Quarter-finals	Quarter-finals	–	–	–	–	–
2005	J1	18	3rd	18,641	Group stage	Quarter-finals	–	–	–	–	–
2006	J1	18	6th	15,433	Runners-up	Semi-finals	–	–	–	–	–
2007	J1	18	1st	16,239	Semi-finals	Winner	–	–	–	–	–
2008	J1	18	1st	19,714	Quarter-finals	5th round	Runners-up	CL	Quarter-finals	–	–
2009	J1	18	1st	21,617	Quarter-finals	Quarter-finals	Winner	CL	Round of 16	–	–
2010	J1	18	4th	20,966	Quarter-finals	Winner	Winner	CL	Round of 16	–	–
2011	J1	18	6th	16,156	Winner	Round of 16	Runners-up	CL	Round of 16	–	–
2012	J1	18	11th	15,381	Winner	Semi-finals	–	–	–	Suruga	Winner
2013	J1	18	5th	16,419	Quarter-finals	Round of 16	–	–	–	Suruga	Winner
2014	J1	18	3rd	17,665	Group stage	2nd round	–	–	–	–	–
2015	J1	18	5th	16,423	Winner	3rd round	–	CL	Group stage	–	–
2016	J1	18	1st	19,103	Group stage	Winner	–	–	–	Suruga	Runners-up
2016	J1	18	1st	19,103	Group stage	Winner	–	–	–	FIFA	Runners-up
2017	J1	18	2nd	20,467	Quarter-finals	Quarter-finals	Winner	CL	Round of 16	–	–
2018	J1	18	3rd	20,547	Semi-finals	Semi-finals	–	CL	Winner	FIFA	4th place
2019	J1	18	3rd	20,571	Semi-finals	Runners-up	–	CL	Quarter-finals	–	–
2020 †	J1	18	5th	6,466	Group stage	Did not qualify	–	CL	Playoff	–	–
2021 †	J1	20	4th	7,818	Quarter-finals	Quarter-finals	–	–	–	–	–
2022	J1	18	4th	16,161	Play-off stage	Semi-finals	–	–	–	–	–
2023	J1	18	5th	20,834	Quarter-finals	3rd round	–	–	–	–	–
2024	J1	20	5th	23,027	3rd round	Quarter-finals	–	–	–	–	–
2025	J1	20	1st	27,400	2nd round	Quarter-finals	–	–	–	–	–
2026	J1	10			N/A	N/A					
2026-27	J1	20			TBD	TBD					

Key

- Attendance/G = Average home league attendance
- † 2020 & 2021 seasons attendances reduced by COVID-19 worldwide pandemic.
- Source: J.League Data Site

== See also ==
- List of world champion football clubs and vice-world champions in football
