= 2014 Kashima Antlers season =

Kashima Antlers
2014 season
- Manager: Toninho Cerezo
- Stadium: Kashima Soccer Stadium
- J.League Division 1: 3rd
- Emperor's Cup: Second round
- J.League Cup: Group stage
- Top goalscorer: League: Davi and Yasushi Endo (10 goals); All: Davi (13 goals)
- Highest home attendance: 32,099 (v. Cerezo Osaka, J.League Division 1, 23 March 2014)
- Lowest home attendance: 3,656 (v. Sony Sendai, Emperor's Cup, 12 July 2014)
- Biggest win: 5–0 (v. Tokushima Vortis, J.League Division 1, 27 September 2014)
- Biggest defeat: 1–4 (v. Kawasaki Frontale, J.League Division 1, 10 May 2014); 0–3 (v. Vissel Kobe, J.League Cup, 28 May 2014)
Home colours	Away colours

The 2014 season was Kashima Antlers' 22nd consecutive season in J.League Division 1, the top flight of Japanese football since the introduction of professional football in 1993. The club finished the 2014 J.League Division 1 in third place, two places above their position from the previous season. They also competed in the Emperor's Cup where they were surprisingly knocked out in the second round by JFL club Sony Sendai FC and the J.League Cup where they did not make it past the group stage.

== Squad ==
=== Season squad ===
Squad no.	Name	Nationality	Position(s)	Date of birth (age at start of season)
Goalkeepers
1	Akihiro Sato	(Japan)	GK	30 August 1986 (aged 27)
21	Hitoshi Sogahata	(Japan)	GK	2 August 1979 (aged 34)
29	Shinichiro Kawamata	(Japan)	GK	23 July 1989 (aged 24)
Defenders
4	Kazuya Yamamura	(Japan)	CB / DM	2 December 1989 (aged 24)
5	Takeshi Aoki	(Japan)	CB / DM	28 September 1982 (aged 31)
15	Gen Shoji	(Japan)	CB / LB	11 December 1992 (aged 21)
16	Shuto Yamamoto	(Japan)	LB	1 June 1985 (aged 28)
17	Takanori Maeno	(Japan)	LB	14 April 1988 (aged 25)
22	Daigo Nishi	(Japan)	RB	28 August 1987 (aged 26)
23	Naomichi Ueda	(Japan)	CB	24 October 1994 (aged 19)
24	Yukitoshi Ito	(Japan)	RB	3 September 1993 (aged 20)
Midfielders
6	Koji Nakata	(Japan)	DM	9 July 1979 (aged 34)
7	Jorge Wagner	(Brazil)	AM / CM / LM	17 November 1979 (aged 34)
8	Luís Alberto	(Brazil)	DM	17 November 1983 (aged 30)
10	Masashi Motoyama	(Japan)	AM / LW	20 June 1979 (aged 34)
13	Atsutaka Nakamura	(Japan)	LW	13 September 1990 (aged 23)
19	Yuta Toyokawa	(Japan)	LW / AM	9 September 1994 (aged 19)
20	Gaku Shibasaki	(Japan)	CM / DM	28 May 1992 (aged 21)
25	Yasushi Endo	(Japan)	LW / RW	7 April 1988 (aged 25)
27	Takahide Umebachi	(Japan)	DM	8 June 1992 (aged 21)
28	Shoma Doi	(Japan)	AM	21 May 1992 (aged 21)
32	Taro Sugimoto	(Japan)	AM	12 February 1996 (aged 17)
33	Caio	(Brazil)	LW / RW	19 April 1994 (aged 19)
35	Takuya Nozawa	(Japan)	AM	12 August 1981 (aged 32)
40	Mitsuo Ogasawara (c)	(Japan)	DM / AM	5 April 1979 (aged 34)
Forwards
7	Jair	(Brazil)	FW / LW	10 June 1988 (aged 25)
11	Davi	(Brazil)	FW	10 March 1984 (aged 29)
18	Shuhei Akasaki	(Japan)	FW	1 September 1991 (aged 22)

Last updated: December 2014.
Source: Soccer D.B.

== Competitions ==
=== J.League Division 1 ===
==== League table ====
Pos	Team	Pld	W	D	L	GF	GA	GD	Pts	Qualification or relegation
1	Gamba Osaka (C)	34	19	6	9	59	31	+28	63	Qualification for 2015 AFC Champions League group stage (Note: Because Gamba Osaka also won the 2014 Emperor's Cup, the group stage spot has been given to third-placed Kashima Antlers, while ACL qualification spot was awarded to the fourth-placed Kashiwa Reysol.)
2	Urawa Red Diamonds	34	18	8	8	52	32	+20	62	Qualification for 2015 AFC Champions League group stage
3	Kashima Antlers	34	18	6	10	64	39	+25	60	Qualification for 2015 AFC Champions League group stage
4	Kashiwa Reysol	34	17	9	8	48	40	+8	60	Qualification for 2015 AFC Champions League Third qualifying round
5	Sagan Tosu	34	19	3	12	41	33	+8	60	

Updated to match(es) played on 8 December 2014. Source: J.League Data
Rules for classification: 1) points; 2) goal difference; 3) number of goals scored.
(C) Champions

==== Results summary ====
Overall								Home						Away					
Pld	W	D	L	GF	GA	GD	Pts	W	D	L	GF	GA	GD	W	D	L	GF	GA	GD
34	18	6	10	64	39	+25	60	7	3	7	27	24	+3	11	3	3	37	15	+22

Last updated: 8 December 2014.
Source: J.League data site

==== Results by matchday ====
Round	1	2	3	4	5	6	7	8	9	10	11	12	13	14	15	16	17	18	19	20	21	22	23	24	25	26	27	28	29	30	31	32	33	34
Ground	A	H	A	H	A	A	H	H	A	H	A	H	A	H	A	H	A	H	A	H	A	H	A	H	A	A	H	H	A	H	A	H	A	H
Result	W	W	W	L	W	W	L	L	W	W	L	L	L	W	D	D	D	W	W	W	W	D	L	W	W	W	L	L	D	D	W	W	W	L
Position	2	1	1	1	1	1	2	4	1	1	2	3	7	4	4	4	4	4	4	4	3	3	4	4	3	2	3	4	4	3	3	3	3	3

Updated to match(es) played on 8 December 2014. Source: J. League data site
A = Away; H = Home; W = Win; D = Draw; L = Loss

==== Results ====
1 March 2014 1	Ventforet Kofu	0–4	Kashima Antlers	Tokyo
14:05 JST		Report	Davi 11', 90+3'; Endo 26' (yellow card) 44'; Shoji 47'	Stadium: Tokyo National Stadium; Attendance: 13,809; Referee: Jumpei Iida

8 March 2014 2	Kashima Antlers	2–0	Vegalta Sendai	Kashima
19:04 JST	Endo 31', 90'; Davi (yellow card) 90+1'	Report		Stadium: Kashima Soccer Stadium; Attendance: 15,033; Referee: Minoru Tōjō

15 March 2014 3	Sagan Tosu	0–3	Kashima Antlers	Tosu
15:04 JST	Taniguchi (yellow card) 49'	Report	Davi (yellow card) 5'; Toyokawa (yellow card) 36' (goal) 72'; Aoki 40' (yellow card) 68'; Doi 59'	Stadium: Best Amenity Stadium; Attendance: 13,013; Referee: Hiroyoshi Takayama

23 March 2014 4	Kashima Antlers	0–2	Cerezo Osaka	Kashima
15:04 JST	Endo (yellow card) 44'; Davi (yellow card) 53'	Report	Hasegawa 19' (yellow card) 49'; Forlán 86'	Stadium: Kashima Soccer Stadium; Attendance: 32,099; Referee: Toshimitsu Yoshida

29 March 2014 5	Yokohama F. Marinos	1–3	Kashima Antlers	Yokohama
14:04 JST	Kurihara 42'; Kobayashi (yellow card) 44'; Nakamachi (yellow card) 77'	Report	Endo (yellow card) 47'; Doi 54'; Nozawa 80'; Shibasaki 87'	Stadium: Nissan Stadium; Attendance: 27,764; Referee: Masaaki Iemoto

6 April 2014 6	Gamba Osaka	0–2	Kashima Antlers	Suita
16:03 JST	Kurata (yellow card) 46'; Endo (yellow card) 75'	Report	Davi 38' (yellow card) 48'; Caio 83'; Umebachi (yellow card) 90'	Stadium: Expo '70 Commemorative Stadium; Attendance: 12,899; Referee: Kenji Ogiya

12 April 2014 7	Kashima Antlers	1–2	Albirex Niigata	Kashima
15:04 JST	Doi 31'	Report	Kawamata 20'; Naruoka (yellow card) 38'; Oi (yellow card) 60'; Aoki 74' (o.g.)	Stadium: Kashima Soccer Stadium; Attendance: 11,953; Referee: Jumpei Iida

19 April 2014 8	Kashima Antlers	2–3	Vissel Kobe	Kashima
15:04 JST	Endo 7'; Aoki (yellow card) 28' (yellow-red card) 65'; Ogasawara (yellow card) 53'; Davi 54'; Motoyama (yellow card) 90+3'	Report	Masukawa (yellow card) 12'; Okui (yellow card) 18'; Jung 25'; Marquinhos 67'; Ogawa 69'	Stadium: Kashima Soccer Stadium; Attendance: 11,952; Referee: Futoshi Nakamura

26 April 2014 9	Sanfrecce Hiroshima	0–3	Kashima Antlers	Hiroshima
19:04 JST		Report	Shoji (yellow card) 7'; Caio 10'; Doi 19'; Ueda (yellow card) 27'; Ito (yellow card) 42'; Yamamoto (yellow card) 49'; Endo 54'	Stadium: Edion Stadium Hiroshima; Attendance: 16,992; Referee: Yuichi Nishimura

29 April 2014 10	Kashima Antlers	2–1	Shimizu S-Pulse	Kashima
15:03 JST	Hiraoka 5' (o.g.); Yamamoto (yellow card) 23'; Ueda (yellow card) 69'; Alberto 79'; Ogasawara (yellow card) 90+1'	Report	Jakovic (yellow card) 7'; Novaković 57'	Stadium: Kashima Soccer Stadium; Attendance: 15,077; Referee: Masaaki Iemoto

3 May 2014 11	Kashiwa Reysol	1–0	Kashima Antlers	Kashiwa
13:04 JST	Kudo 45'; Barada (yellow card) 53'; Kondo (yellow card) 55'	Report	Caio (yellow card) 69'	Stadium: Hitachi Kashiwa Soccer Stadium; Attendance: 13,650; Referee: Minoru Tōjō

6 May 2014 12	Kashima Antlers	1–2	Nagoya Grampus	Kashima
15:04 JST	Umebachi (yellow card) 12'; Davi 43'	Report	Ogawa 35' (yellow card) 56'; Yano (yellow card) 42'; Tamada 54' (yellow card) 88'; Matsuda (yellow card) 90+1'	Stadium: Kashima Soccer Stadium; Attendance: 15,122; Referee: Toshimitsu Yoshida

10 May 2014 13	Kawasaki Frontale	4–1	Kashima Antlers	Kawasaki
15:03 JST	Kobayashi 3', 57'; Okubo 83', 89'	Report	Ito (yellow card) 39'; Aoki (yellow card) 48'; Davi (yellow card) 79'	Stadium: Kawasaki Todoroki Stadium; Attendance: 17,451; Referee: Nobutsugu Murakami

17 May 2014 14	Kashima Antlers	1–0	Tokushima Vortis	Kashima
19:04 JST	Ueda (yellow card) 11'; Akasaki 25'; Nakata (yellow card) 64'	Report	Alex (yellow card) 5'	Stadium: Kashima Soccer Stadium; Attendance: 13,544; Referee: Hiroyoshi Takayama

19 July 2014 15	FC Tokyo	1–1	Kashima Antlers	Chōfu
18:34 JST	Mita (yellow card) 36' (goal) 60'; Muto (yellow card) 74'; Yonemoto (yellow card) 90+8'	Report	Shoji (yellow card) 4'; Davi (yellow card) 10'; Ogasawara (yellow card) 25'; Toyokawa 86'; Alberto (red card) 90+5'	Stadium: Ajinomoto Stadium; Attendance: 27,387; Referee: Yudai Yamamoto

23 July 2014 16	Kashima Antlers	2–2	Omiya Ardija	Kashima
19:03 JST	Davi 34'; Caio 58'; Nishi (yellow card) 74'	Report	Masuda (yellow card) 55'; Ienaga 57'; Ljubijankic 68'	Stadium: Kashima Soccer Stadium; Attendance: 8,840; Referee: Masaaki Iemoto

27 July 2014 17	Urawa Red Diamonds	1–1	Kashima Antlers	Saitama
18:04 JST	Koroki 20'; Ugajin (yellow card) 90+4'	Report	Shibasaki 30'; Yamamura (yellow card) 71'	Stadium: Saitama Stadium 2002; Attendance: 39,205; Referee: Yuichi Nishimura

2 August 2014 18	Kashima Antlers	5–1	Sanfrecce Hiroshima	Kashima
18:34 JST	Caio 9'; Nakamura (yellow card) 48'; Alberto 66'; Shibasaki (yellow card) 67' (goal) 83'; Nishi 70'; Davi 81'	Report	Shibasaki (yellow card) 34'; Ishihara (yellow card) 48'; Kashiwa 55'	Stadium: Kashima Soccer Stadium; Attendance: 16,632; Referee: Kenji Ogiya

9 August 2014 19	Nagoya Grampus	2–3	Kashima Antlers	Toyota
19:04 JST	Nagai 25'; Kennedy 47'; Taguchi (yellow card) 70'; Yano (yellow card) 75'	Report	Shibasaki (yellow card) 33'; Yamamoto 42'; Nakamura (yellow card) 45+2'; Davi (yellow card) 77' (goal) 82'; Endo 90'	Stadium: Toyota Stadium; Attendance: 16,369; Referee: Koichiro Fukushima

16 August 2014 20	Kashima Antlers	1–0	Ventforet Kofu	Kashima
18:33 JST	Shibasaki 1'	Report	Hosaka (yellow card) 64'	Stadium: Kashima Soccer Stadium; Attendance: 16,724; Referee: Hiroyoshi Takayama

23 August 2014 21	Shimizu S-Pulse	1–3	Kashima Antlers	Shizuoka
18:04 JST	Omae 31'; Lee (yellow card) 46' (yellow-red card) 66'; Yoshida (yellow card) 59'; Novaković (yellow card) 90+5'	Report	Ogasawara (yellow card) 21' (goal) 61', 68'; Doi (yellow card) 31'; Shoji (yellow card) 44'; Ueda (yellow card) 45+2' (yellow-red card) 63'; Davi 72'; Endo (yellow card) 90+3'	Stadium: IAI Stadium Nihondaira; Attendance: 13,447; Referee: Tomohiro Inoue

30 August 2014 22	Kashima Antlers	2–2	FC Tokyo	Kashima
19:04 JST	Doi 10'; Davi 26'; Caio (yellow card) 50'; Aoki (red card) 70'	Report	Edu 49' (yellow card) 64'; Muto 87'	Stadium: Kashima Soccer Stadium; Attendance: 19,839; Referee: Jumpei Iida

13 September 2014 23	Omiya Ardija	2–1	Kashima Antlers	Kumagaya
18:05 JST	Kanazawa (yellow card) 25'; Mrđa 34'; Takahashi 74'; Izumisawa (yellow card) 85'	Report	Shoji 69'; Nakamura (yellow card) 76'	Stadium: Kumagaya Athletic Stadium; Attendance: 14,182; Referee: Nobutsugu Murakami

20 September 2014 24	Kashima Antlers	1–0	Yokohama F. Marinos	Kashima
19:04 JST	Endo 38'	Report	Kurihara (yellow card) 69'	Stadium: Kashima Soccer Stadium; Attendance: 17,834; Referee: Yoshiro Imamura

23 September 2014 25	Vegalta Sendai	0–1	Kashima Antlers	Sendai
14:04 JST	Ota (yellow card) 28'; Wilson (yellow card) 67'	Report	Davi (yellow card) 35'; Ogasawara (yellow card) 39'; Doi 43'	Stadium: Yurtec Stadium Sendai; Attendance: 17,006; Referee: Takuto Okabe

27 September 2014 26	Tokushima Vortis	0–5	Kashima Antlers	Tokushima
19:04 JST	Saito (yellow card) 28'	Report	Caio 39', 58'; Doi 40'; Endo 59', 71'; Yamamura (yellow card) 79'	Stadium: Pocari Sweat Stadium; Attendance: 10,493; Referee: Ryuji Sato

5 October 2014 27	Kashima Antlers	2–3	Gamba Osaka	Kashima
12:34 JST	Akasaki 5'; Caio (yellow card) 45'; Ogasawara (yellow card) 56'; Doi 65'; Yamamoto (yellow card) 88'	Report	Aoki 29' (o.g.); Konno (yellow card) 69'; Patric 71'; Lins 90+3'	Stadium: Kashima Soccer Stadium; Attendance: 17,939; Referee: Toshimitsu Yoshida

18 October 2014 28	Kashima Antlers	2–3	Kashiwa Reysol	Kashima
14:04 JST	Nishi 35'; Nakamura 68'	Report	Leandro 45+3'; Suzuki (yellow card) 63' (yellow-red card) 76'; Dudu 69'; Ota 90'; Kurisawa (yellow card) 90+5'	Stadium: Kashima Soccer Stadium; Attendance: 15,577; Referee: Nobutsugu Murakami

22 October 2014 29	Vissel Kobe	0–0	Kashima Antlers	Kobe
19:04 JST	Masukawa (yellow card) 61'; Marquinhos (yellow card) 77'	Report		Stadium: Noevir Stadium Kobe; Attendance: 9,375; Referee: Yoshiro Imamura

26 October 2014 30	Kashima Antlers	1–1	Urawa Red Diamonds	Kashima
19:04 JST	Yamamoto (yellow card) 5'; Caio 39'; Nishi (yellow card) 41'; Toyokawa (yellow card) 76'	Report	Lee 63'	Stadium: Kashima Soccer Stadium; Attendance: 26,566; Referee: Jumpei Iida

2 November 2014 31	Albirex Niigata	1–2	Kashima Antlers	Niigata
16:04 JST	Suzuki 43'; Ibusuki (yellow card) 58'; Fitzgerald (yellow card) 77'	Report	Ueda (yellow card) 55'; Nakamura 62'; Maeno (yellow card) 85'; Nishi 86'	Stadium: Denka Big Swan Stadium; Attendance: 27,809; Referee: Minoru Tōjō

22 November 2014 32	Kashima Antlers	2–1	Kawasaki Frontale	Kashima
14:04 JST	Endo 45' (yellow card) 85'; Akasaki 53'; Alberto (yellow card) 76'	Report	Inamoto (yellow card) 84'; Renato 90+1'; Noborizato (yellow card) 90+2'; An (yellow card) 90+3'	Stadium: Kashima Soccer Stadium; Attendance: 20,261; Referee: Hiroyuki Kimura

29 November 2014 33	Cerezo Osaka	1–4	Kashima Antlers	Osaka
14:04 JST	Nagai 69'; Sakemoto (yellow card) 72'; Ogihara (yellow card) 74'; Cacau (yellow card) 90+1'	Report	Caio (yellow card) 28' (goal) 33'; Akasaki 59', 67'; Shibasaki 80'	Stadium: Yanmar Stadium Nagai; Attendance: 23,330; Referee: Hajime Matsuo

6 December 2014 34	Kashima Antlers	0–1	Sagan Tosu	Kashima
15:33 JST	Shibasaki (yellow card) 25'; Doi (yellow card) 25'; Shoji (yellow card) 42'	Report	Takahashi 6'; Yasuda (yellow card) 45+2'	Stadium: Kashima Soccer Stadium; Attendance: 25,318; Referee: Masaaki Iemoto

=== Emperor's Cup ===
Kashima entered into the tournament in the second round, looking to improve on their fourth round exit in 2013. They had drawn and beaten their second round opponents, JFL club Sony Sendai in the second round the previous year, but one of the shocks of the tournament was Kashima's extra time and penalties defeat.

12 July 2014 Second round	Kashima Antlers	2–2 (a.e.t.) (1–2 p)	Sony Sendai	Kashima
18:00 JST	Davi 33'; Caio 36'	Report	Hosomi 23'; Tanaka 28'	Stadium: Kashima Soccer Stadium; Attendance: 3,656; Referee: Hiroyuki Kimura
	Penalties
	Ogasawara (penalty scored); Nozawa (penalty missed); Shibasaki (penalty missed); Nakamura (penalty missed); Yamamoto (penalty missed)		(penalty missed) Seta; (penalty missed) Miyao; (penalty scored) Nakamura; (penalty scored) Sawaguchi

=== J.League Cup ===
As one of the fourteen teams not to receive a bye, Kashima entered into Group A with six other J.League Division 1 clubs. After winning three of their six games in the competition, they finished fourth in the group stage and therefore did not qualify for the quarter-finals.

==== Group stage ====
Pos	Team	Pld	W	D	L	GF	GA	GD	Pts	Qualification	GAM	VIS	SAG	ANT	SPU	FCT	VEG
1	Gamba Osaka	6	4	0	2	9	4	+5	12	Advanced to quarter-finals	—	2–0		2–1		3–1	
2	Vissel Kobe	6	4	0	2	10	9	+1	12	Advanced to quarter-finals		—	3–2			0–3	2–1
3	Sagan Tosu	6	3	0	3	9	8	+1	9		0–2		—		2–0		2–0
4	Kashima Antlers	6	3	0	3	10	10	0	9			0–3	3–1	—	3–0		
5	Shimizu S-Pulse	6	3	0	3	9	9	0	9		1–0	1–2			—		4–0
6	FC Tokyo	6	2	1	3	10	10	0	7				0–2	3–1	2–3	—	
7	Vegalta Sendai	6	1	1	4	4	11	−7	4		1–0			1–2		1–1	—

Source: Table, Results

19 March 2014	FC Tokyo	3–1	Kashima Antlers	Chōfu
19:00 JST	Kawano 8' (yellow card) 44'; Ota 10'; Matsuda (yellow card) 35'; Mita 71'	Report	Shoji (yellow card) 57'; Motoyama 72'; Davi (yellow card) 76'	Stadium: Ajinomoto Stadium; Attendance: 10,353; Referee: Nobutsugu Murakami

2 April 2014	Kashima Antlers	3–1	Sagan Tosu	Kashima
19:00 JST	Davi 38'; Umebachi 83'; Alberto 87'	Report	Choi (yellow card) 17'; Hayasaka 22'; Kanai (yellow card) 38'	Stadium: Kashima Soccer Stadium; Attendance: 6,966; Referee: Yuichi Nishimura

16 April 2014	Vegalta Sendai	1–2	Kashima Antlers	Sendai
19:04 JST	Kamata (yellow card) 52'; Muto 60'	Report	Nozawa 41'; Akasaki 83'	Stadium: Yurtec Stadium Sendai; Attendance: 7,583; Referee: Takuya Maeda

21 May 2014	Gamba Osaka	2–1	Kashima Antlers	Suita
19:03 JST	Kurata 4'; Nishino (yellow card) 30'; Yonekura 80'	Report	Davi 72'	Stadium: Expo '70 Commemorative Stadium; Attendance: 8,103; Referee: Yoshiro Imamura

28 May 2014	Kashima Antlers	0–3	Vissel Kobe	Kashima
19:00 JST		Report	Sugiura 9'; Oya 57'; Hashimoto 75'	Stadium: Kashima Soccer Stadium; Attendance: 6,054; Referee: Hajime Matsuo

1 June 2014	Kashima Antlers	3–0	Shimizu S-Pulse	Kashima
15:00 JST	Toyokawa (yellow card) 11'; Doi 16'; Akasaki 26'; Shoji (yellow card) 43'; Endo 90+3'	Report	Yoshida (yellow card) 65'; Jaković (yellow card) 73'	Stadium: Kashima Soccer Stadium; Attendance: 10,667; Referee: Kenji Ogiya

== Statistics ==
=== Appearances ===
Last updated: 6 December 2014.
Source: Soccer D.B.

No.	Pos.	Name	J1 League		Emperor's Cup		J.League Cup		Total	
No.	Pos.	Name	Apps	Goals	Apps	Goals	Apps	Goals	Apps	Goals
Goalkeepers
1	GK	(Japan) Akihiro Sato	0	0	0	0	1	0	1	0
21	GK	(Japan) Hitoshi Sogahata	34	0	1	0	5	0	40	0
Defenders
4	DF	(Japan) Kazuya Yamamura	2+6	0	0	0	1	0	9	0
5	DF	(Japan) Takeshi Aoki	14+4	1	1	0	2	0	21	1
15	DF	(Japan) Gen Shoji	34	2	0	0	6	0	40	2
16	DF	(Japan) Shuto Yamamoto	32	1	1	0	5	0	38	1
17	DF	(Japan) Takanori Maeno	2	0	0	0	1	0	3	0
22	DF	(Japan) Daigo Nishi	22+1	3	1	0	2	0	26	3
23	DF	(Japan) Naomichi Ueda	18+2	0	1	0	3	0	24	0
24	DF	(Japan) Yukitoshi Ito	12	0	0	0	4	0	16	0
Midfielders
6	MF	(Japan) Koji Nakata	0+3	0	0	0	0+1	0	4	0
7	MF	(Brazil) Jorge Wagner	2+6	0	0	0	0	0	8	0
8	MF	(Brazil) Luís Alberto	0+16	2	0	0	2+1	1	19	3
10	MF	(Japan) Masashi Motoyama	0+12	0	0	0	1+1	1	14	1
13	MF	(Japan) Atsutaka Nakamura	5+9	2	0+1	0	1	0	16	2
19	MF	(Japan) Yuta Toyokawa	8+9	2	0	0	2+1	0	20	2
20	MF	(Japan) Gaku Shibasaki	34	6	1	0	6	0	41	6
25	MF	(Japan) Yasushi Endo	26+4	10	1	0	5	1	36	11
27	MF	(Japan) Takahide Umebachi	2+3	0	0	0	1+3	1	9	1
28	MF	(Japan) Shoma Doi	33+1	8	1	0	5+1	1	41	9
32	MF	(Japan) Taro Sugimoto	0+4	0	0	0	0	0	4	0
33	MF	(Brazil) Caio	25+5	8	1	1	2+4	0	37	9
40	MF	(Japan) Mitsuo Ogasawara	33	2	1	0	3+1	0	38	2
Forwards
11	FW	(Brazil) Davi	24+1	10	1	1	4+1	2	31	13
18	FW	(Japan) Shuhei Akasaki	10+5	5	0+1	0	2+1	2	19	7
Players loaned or transferred out during the season
7	FW	(Brazil) Jair	2+3	0	0	0	1	0	6	0
35	MF	(Japan) Takuya Nozawa	0+8	1	0+1	0	1+3	1	13	2

=== Goalscorers ===
The list is sorted by shirt number when total goals are equal.

Rnk	Pos	No.	Player	J1 League	Emperor's Cup	J.League Cup	Total
1	FW	11	(Brazil) Davi	10	1	2	13
2	MF	25	(Japan) Yasushi Endo	10	0	1	11
3	MF	28	(Japan) Shoma Doi	8	0	1	9
3	MF	33	(Brazil) Caio	8	1	0	9
5	FW	18	(Japan) Shuhei Akasaki	5	0	2	7
6	MF	20	(Japan) Gaku Shibasaki	6	0	0	6
7	MF	8	(Brazil) Luís Alberto	2	0	1	3
7	DF	22	(Japan) Daigo Nishi	3	0	0	3
9	MF	13	(Japan) Atsutaka Nakamura	2	0	0	2
9	DF	15	(Japan) Gen Shoji	2	0	0	2
9	MF	19	(Japan) Yuta Toyokawa	2	0	0	2
9	MF	35	(Japan) Takuya Nozawa	1	0	1	2
9	MF	40	(Japan) Mitsuo Ogasawara	2	0	0	2
14	DF	5	(Japan) Takeshi Aoki	1	0	0	1
14	MF	10	(Japan) Masashi Motoyama	0	0	1	1
14	DF	16	(Japan) Shuto Yamamoto	1	0	0	1
14	MF	27	(Japan) Takahide Umebachi	0	0	1	1
Total				63	2	10	75

Last updated: 6 December 2014.
Source: Soccer D.B.

=== Clean sheets ===
The list is sorted by shirt number when total clean sheets are equal.

Rnk	No.	Player	J1 League	Emperor's Cup	J. League Cup	Total
1	31	(Japan) Hitoshi Sogahata	11	0	1	12
2	1	(Japan) Akihiro Sato	0	0	0	0
Total			11	0	1	12

Last updated: 6 December 2014.
Source: fbref.com
