= Gaku Shibasaki =

Japanese footballer (born 1992)

Gaku Shibasaki 柴崎 岳
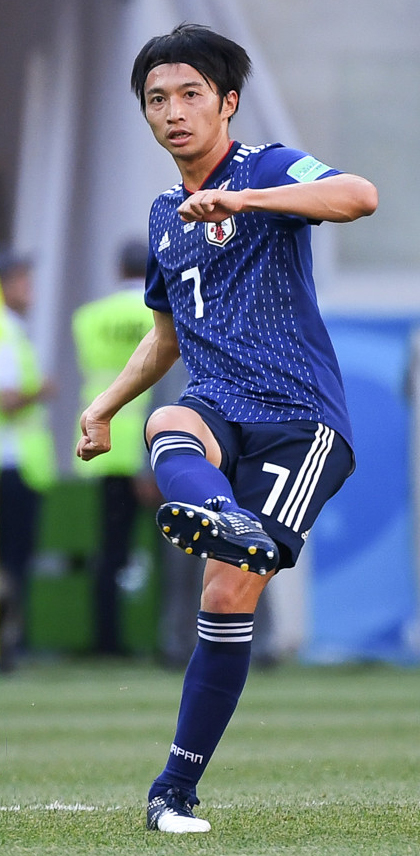
- Shibasaki playing for Japan at the 2018 FIFA World Cup

Personal information
- Full name: Gaku Shibasaki
- Date of birth: 28 May 1992 (age 34)
- Place of birth: Noheji, Aomori, Japan
- Height: 1.75 m (5 ft 9 in)
- Position: Midfielder

Team information
- Current team: Kashima Antlers
- Number: 10

Youth career
- –2004: Noheji SSS
- 2005–2007: Aomori Yamada Junior High School
- 2008–2010: Aomori Yamada High School

Senior career*
| Years | Team | Apps | (Gls) |
| 2011–2016 | Kashima Antlers | 172 | (17) |
| 2017 | Tenerife | 16 | (2) |
| 2017–2019 | Getafe | 29 | (1) |
| 2019–2020 | Deportivo La Coruña | 26 | (0) |
| 2020–2023 | Leganés | 98 | (5) |
| 2023– | Kashima Antlers | 60 | (0) |

International career^{‡}
| 2007–2009 | Japan U17 | 11 | (2) |
| 2014–2022 | Japan | 60 | (3) |
Medal record
Representing Japan
AFC Asian Cup
| Silver medal – second place | 2019 United Arab Emirates |
- * Club domestic league appearances and goals as of 9 August 2026 ‡ National team caps and goals as of 17 November 2022

Gaku Shibasaki (柴崎 岳, Shibasaki Gaku; born 28 May 1992) is a Japanese professional footballer who plays as a midfielder for and captains J1 League club Kashima Antlers.

== Club career ==
=== Early career ===
Born in Noheji, Aomori, Japan, Shibasaki began playing in his first year at elementary school. Once he started junior school at Aomori Yamada High School, he left his hometown and started living in a dormitory, saying: "In a higher level environment, the dream of becoming a professional at that time is now a waypoint into the future. I would like to play an active role in Kashima's match in a year." During his time at high school, he quickly developed with his well-balanced plate accurate kick for offense and defence, as well as, his high judgment and high precision. Two years later on 11 January 2010, Shibasaki helped Aomoriyamada High School reach the final of National High School Championship Final, only to lose 1–0 against Yamanashi Gakuin University. Following the end of the tournament, he was among 36 players named as the best players by the National Sports Committee of the Football Association. Later in August 2010, Shibasaki was among 33 players named as the best players by the National Sports Committee of the Football Association once again. Towards the end of the year, he also became a captain for Aomoriyamada High School and helped the All Japan Youth Championship Final, only to lose 2–0 against Tokyo U-18.

It was announced on 20 January 2010 that Shibasaki will be joining Kashima Antlers, starting from the 2011 season. Upon joining the club, he revealed that he had offers from Nagoya Grampus, but opted to join Kashima Antlers instead.

=== Kashima Antlers ===
Ahead of the 2011 season, Shibasaki was given a number twenty shirt at the club. He began to learn to play in the right–back position under the management of Oswaldo de Oliveira and potentially be used as a cover following an injury of Daigo Nishi. Shibasaki made his Kashima Antlers' debut against Avispa Fukuoka on 29 April 2011, coming on as a late substitute, in a 2–1 win. Four days later on 3 May 2011, he made his AFC Champions League debut, coming on as a late substitute, in a 2–0 win against Shanghai Shenhua. A month later on 18 June 2011, Shibasaki made his first start for the side, starting the whole game, in a 2–0 win against Júbilo Iwata. However, he fractured his foot during a 1–0 win against Vissel Kobe on 22 June 2011 and was sidelined for two months. It wasn't until on 18 September 2011 when Shibasaki returned from injury, coming on as a 76th-minute substitute, in a 1–1 draw against Nagoya Grampus. He then scored his first goal for the club, in a 2–1 win against Nagoya Grampus in the semi–finals of the J. League Cup to reach the final. Shortly after, Shibasaki signed an "A contract". In the J.League Cup Final against Urawa Red Diamonds, Shibasaki started the whole game, as he helped the club win 1–0 to win the J.League Cup. Following this, he received a handful of first team football for the remaining matches of the 2011 season. At the end of the 2011 season, Shibasaki went on to make twenty appearances and scoring once in all competitions.

Ahead of the 2012 season, Shibasaki was appointed as the club's vice–captain, alongside Daigo Nishi. He started three matches in the first four league matches before suffering a thigh strain during a 1–0 win against Omiya Ardija in the J.League Cup on 4 April 2012. It wasn't until on 21 April 2012 when Shibasaki made his return from injury against Cerezo Osaka, coming on as a 31st-minute substitute, and helped Kashima Antlers make a comeback from 2–0 down to beat them 3–2. He later regained his first team place, playing in the central midfield position following his return from injury. Shibasaki started in the Suruga Bank Championship against Universidad de Chile and played for 62 minutes before being substituted, as Kashima Antlers won 7–6 on penalties after the game was played throughout 120 minutes with a 2–2 draw. Seven days later on 8 August 2012, he scored his first goal of the season, in a 3–0 win against Cerezo Osaka in the second leg of the J.League Cup quarter–finals to send the club through to the next round. Two months later on 6 October 2012, Shibasaki scored his second goal of the season, in a 5–1 win against FC Tokyo. In the J.League Cup Final against Shimizu S-Pulse, Shibasaki started and scored twice in the game, as Kashima Antlers won 2–1 after the game went extra time, to win the J.League Cup for the second time in a row. After the match, he was named the Most Valuable Player in the game. Manager Jorginho praised Shibasaki's performance and believed that he could be playing in Europe in the future. Despite one match due to a suspension, he went on to make forty–five appearances and scoring four times in all competitions. For his performance, Shibasaki was awarded J.League's Best Young Player Award.

At the start of the 2013 season, Shibasaki continued to regain his first team place, playing in the central midfield position. It wasn't until on 13 April 2013 when he scored his first goal of the season, in a 3–2 win against Oita Trinita. Two weeks later on 27 April 2013, Shibasaki scored his second goal of the season, in a 3–2 win against Albirex Niigata. His goal against Albirex Niigata earned him April's Goal of the Month. Over the summer, he was linked a move to Bundesliga side 1. FC Nürnberg. Despite this, he started in the 2013 Suruga Bank Championship against São Paulo and helped them win 3–2 to win the trophy once again. Later in the 2013 season, Shibasaki helped the side finish fifth place in the league, but missed out on qualifying for the AFC Champions League. Despite this, he went on to make forty–five appearances and scoring two times in all competitions, having played every single matches of the 2013 season.

In the 2014 season, Shibasaki continued to regain his first team place, playing in the central midfield position. It wasn't until on 29 March 2014 when he scored his first goal of the season, and set up the club's second goal of the game, in a 3–1 win against Yokohama F. Marinos. Shibasaki captained Kashima Antlers for the first time in his career and led the side win 3–1 against Sagan Tosu in the J. League Cup match on 2 April 2014. In a follow–up J. League Cup match, he captained once again and led the side win 2–1 win against Vegalta Sendai. His second goal of the season came on 10 May 2014, in a 4–1 loss against Kawasaki Frontale. Shibasaki then scored two goals in two matches between 27 July 2014 and 2 August 2014 against Urawa Red Diamonds and Sanfrecce Hiroshima. Two weeks later on 16 August 2014, he scored his fifth goal of the season, in a 1–0 win against Ventforet Kofu. His goal against the opposition team resulted in him being named J.League Goal of the Week. In a match against FC Tokyo on 30 August 2014, Shibasaki captained the side for the third time this season, helping drew 2–2. His performance throughout August resulted in him being named August's J.League Player of the Month. It wasn't until on 29 November 2014 when Shibasaki scored his sixth goal of the season, in a 4–1 win against Cerezo Osaka. At the end of the 2014 season, he went on to make forty–one appearances and scoring six times in all competitions. For his performance, Shibasaki was named J.League Best XI.

Ahead of the 2015 season, Shibisaki was linked a move to Serie A side AC Milan, but no move took place. At the start of the 2015 season, he was given a captaincy following the absence of Mitsuo Ogasawara. Shibasaki captained his first match of the season, starting the whole and set up the club's only goal of the game, in a 3–1 loss against Shimizu S-Pulse in the opening game of the season. He then scored his first goal of the season, in a 4–3 loss against Guangzhou Evergrande Taobao on 18 March 2015. Shibasaki played an important role against Sagan Tosu on 8 April 2015, scoring and setting the club's first and third goal of the match, in a 3–1 win. Two weeks later on 25 April 2015, he scored third goal of the season, in a 2–1 loss against Vissel Kobe, and this followed by a week late, scoring 3–2 win against FC Seoul in the AFC Champions League match, which saw Kashima Antlers eliminated in the group stage. A month later on 20 June 2015, Shibasaki played another important role when he set up the club's second and third goal of the game, in a 3–0 win against Yokohama F. Marinos. Shortly after, he suffered a foot injury that kept him out for a month. Shibasaki made his return to the starting line-up against FC Tokyo on 25 July 2015, where he scored the opening goal of the game after breaking a deadlock in the 30th minute and set up a winning goal for Gen Shoji, in a 2–1 win. Four days later on 29 July 2015 in a follow–up, Shibasaki scored twice for the side, in a 3–0 win against Sagan Tosu. Following his return, he later regained his first team place for the rest of the 2015 season. In the J.League Cup against Gamba Osaka, Shibasaki started the match and set up the club's third goal of the game, resulting a 3–0 win for Kashima Antlers to win the tournament.

Ahead of the 2016 season, Shibasaki switched number shirt from twenty to ten. At the start of the 2016 season, Shibasaki continued to regain his first team place for the side, playing in the central midfield position. It wasn't until on 10 April 2016 when he scored his first goal of the season and then setting up a goal for Caio, who scored twice in a game, in a 4–1 win against Sanfrecce Hiroshima. A month later on 29 May 2016, Shibasaki set up the club's first goal of the game and then scored the club's third goal of the game, in a 4–0 win against Ventforet Kofu. He later scored two goals throughout September, scoring against Kataller Toyama and Albirex Niigata. However, Shibasaki suffered a foot injury that kept him out for a month. Following the club's qualification to finish third place at the end of the J.League second stage, he didn't make his return until the final against Urawa Red Diamonds and played in both legs, as Kashima Antlers drew 2–2 on aggregate through away goal, resulting in the club becoming Champions. In the 2016 Club World Cup, Shibasaki started all three matches and helped Kashima Antlers progress in the knockout stages to the final. He rose to prominence after scoring twice for Kashima Antlers in the final of the 2016 Club World Cup against Real Madrid. Real Madrid would eventually go on to win the match 4–2 albeit in extra time, after a hat-trick from Cristiano Ronaldo. Despite losing in the final, Shibasaki's performance was praised by the media, both in and outside of Japan. In addition, he was awarded the Adidas Bronze Ball at the tournament. Following this, Shibasaki helped the club bounce back from the defeat, setting up two goals to beat Yokohama F. Marinos to help Kashima Antlers reach the Emperor's Cup Final. He helped the club beat Kawasaki Frontale 2–1 to win the Emperor's Cup Final. At the end of the 2016 season, he went on to make forty–six appearances and scoring six times in all competitions.

=== Tenerife ===
Following the 2016 season, Shibasaki was linked a move away from Kashima Antlers, which the club's executives were willing to sell him at a right price. It was announced on 31 January 2017, Shibasaki signed a six-month contract with Spanish Segunda División side CD Tenerife. His departure was confirmed by Kashima Antlers the next day. He was linked with a move to Las Palmas but chose instead to join CD Tenerife.

Having trained with the club shortly, Shibasaki's career at CD Tenerife, however, suffered a setback when he struggled to adapt to an unfamiliar environment, and at one point, wanted to leave the club. But Shibasaki managed to overcome the setback and resumed training with the side, with the club's manager José Luis Martí called on the media and supporters for patient on Shibasaki and give him more time in adapt in Spain. He made his debut for the club on 19 March 2017, replacing Aitor Sanz in a 1–0 home loss against CF Reus Deportiu. Since making his debut for CD Tenerife, Shibasaki said in an interview with Marca that his style of football fit well in Spain and acknowledged that the differences of "the pace of the game" in Spain compared to Japan. Shibasaki then scored his first goal abroad on 28 May 2017 (as well as, his 25th birthday), netting his team's second in a 3–1 away win against AD Alcorcón. He became a regular starter for the side and impressed during the play-offs, scoring the winner in a 1–0 home success over Cádiz CF; his side, however, failed to achieve promotion. Despite this, Shibasaki's performance earned him recognition among CD Tenerife supporters and the Manager, José Luis Martí, himself. At the end of the 2016–17 season, he went on to make sixteen appearances and scoring two times in all competitions.

=== Getafe ===
Despite CD Tenerife planned on extending his contract, it was announced on that 17 July 2017 Shibasaki signed a four-year contract with Getafe CF, recently promoted to La Liga instead. Upon joining the club, he said about the transfer move: "I had been wanting to reach the Spanish League for a long time. Since last season I was able to be in Spain and now I have been able to take the opportunity to be here."

Shibasaki made his debut in the category on 20 August 2017, starting in a 0–0 away draw against Athletic Bilbao. He scored his first goal for Getafe against FC Barcelona in a 1–2 loss at home. However, during the match, Shibasaki suffered a foot injury and was substituted in the 54th minute; as a result, he was sidelined for three months, with December was his expectant return date. It wasn't until on 9 December 2017 when he made his return, coming on as a 74th-minute substitute, in a 0–0 draw against SD Eibar. Since returning to the first team, Shibasaki rotated in the starting line–up, mostly coming from the substitute bench. At the end of the 2017–18 season, he went on to make twenty–appearances and scoring once in all competitions.

Shibasaki made his first start of the 2018–19 season, starting the whole game, in a 2–0 loss against Real Madrid in the opening game of the season. However, his first team opportunities at Getafe soon became limited and spent most of the season on the substitute bench. After spending 127 days without playing for the side, Shibasaki made his return against Sevilla on 21 April 2019, where he started and played 61 minutes before being substituted, in a 3–0 win. At the end of the 2018–19 season, Shibasaki went on to make nine appearances in all competitions. Reflecting on his second season at Getafe, he said: "I haven't played so much in the league for the last two years. After all, I want to prove my strength in a tournament of this level."

=== Deportivo La Coruña ===
On 14 July 2019, Shibasaki signed a four-year contract with Deportivo de La Coruña in the second division, for a reported fee of around €2 million. He was previously linked with a move to UNAM and SD Huesca. Upon joining the club, Shibasaki said his objectives at Deportivo La Coruña is to get more playing time and helped the club get promoted to La Liga. In addition, he was given a number twenty–two shirt.

Shibasaki made his Deportivo La Coruña debut, starting the whole game, in a 3–2 win against Real Oviedo in the opening game of the season. After the match, his performance was praised by the Spanish newspaper. In a follow–up match against SD Huesca, he set up a goal for Christian Santos to score the late consolation, in a 3–1 loss. Since making his debut for the club, Shibasaki found himself in and out of the starting line–up, which saw him placed on the substitute bench. This also combined with his international commitment. He acknowledged his progress to improve in the first team, saying: "I am sure that I can give much more and improve my performance, it is true that we are not giving a good level as a team, but we will surely improve with the coming days." By mid–December, however, he suffered a hamstring injury that kept him out for a month. It wasn't until on 16 January 2020 when Shibasaki made his first team return, starting the whole game, in a 2–1 win against Racing de Santander. After the match, he was named Team of the Week by Marca. In a follow–up match against Cádiz CF, Shibasaki played an important role when he set up a goal for Sabin Merino, who scored the only goal of the game, in a 1–0 win for Deportivo La Coruña. Following his return, Shibasaki regained his first team place under the new management of Fernando Vázquez. However, he was sent off for a second bookable offence in a 3–1 defeat against Real Zaragoza on 23 February 2020. After serving a one match suspension, Shibasaki made his first team return on 7 March 2020, starting the whole game, in a 4–0 loss against UD Almería. By the time the season was suspended because of the COVID-19 pandemic, he had made 17 league appearances. Shibasaki remained an integral part of the club once the season resumed behind closed doors. However, in a match against Elche CF on 23 June 2020, he received a straight red card in the 32nd minute for an unprofessional foul on Iván Sánchez, as Deportivo La Coruña won 1–0. After serving a one match suspension, Shibasaki returned to the starting line–up against CD Tenerife on 30 June 2021 and started the whole game, as the club drew 1–1. However, he missed the last game of the season against CF Fuenlabrada, due to injury and Deportivo de La Coruña's relegation was confirmed on 7 August 2020 despite winning 2–1. At the end of the 2019–20 season, Shibasaki went on to make twenty–seven appearances in all competitions.

=== Leganés ===
On 4 September 2020, Shibasaki agreed to a three-year contract with CD Leganés, recently relegated to the second division as a result of the relegation clause being activated. He was previously linked with a move to Las Palmas but opted to join Leganés instead.

Shibasaki made his debut for the club, coming on as a second half substitute, in a 1–0 win against UD Las Palmas in the opening game of the season. In a follow–up match against CD Lugo, he set up a goal for Sabin Merino, in a 2–1 loss. Shibasaki played a key role to the game by setting up the only goal of the game, in a 1–0 win against Real Zaragoza on 22 October 2020. Three days later on 25 October 2020, he scored his first goal for the club, in a 2–1 win against Real Oviedo. Since joining CD Leganés, Shibasaki became a first team regular for the club, playing in the midfield position. He then scored his second goal for the club, as well as, setting up the winning goal, in a 2–1 win against AD Alcorcón on 25 April 2021. However, Shibasaki's absence from the first team due to injury saw CD Leganés unsuccessfully promoted back to La Liga after the club lost 5–1 on aggregate in the play-offs. Despite being absence from the first team on four occasions throughout the 2020–21 season, he went on to make thirty–five appearances and scoring two times in all competitions.

=== Return to Kashima Antlers ===
Following the expiration of his contract with Leganés, it was announced on 1 September 2023 that Shibasaki had re-joined Kashima Antlers. He joined the first team of the club on 4 September 2023 and was assigned squad number 20. On 21 October 2023, he suffered a left hamstring injury that would keep him out for 8 weeks.

Ahead of the 2024 season, Shibasaki was appointed captain and given the number 10 shirt. He made 26 appearances across all competitions.

== International career ==
=== Youth career ===
Throughout 2007, Shibasaki represented the Japan U-15 side and appeared for the U-15 side in a number of matches.

In 2008, Shibasaki was called up to the Japan U-16 squad for both the Montaigu Tournament and Viktor Bannikov Memorial Tournament. Later in September 2008, he was called up to the Japan U-16 squad for the AFC U-16 Championship in Uzbekistan. Shibasaki scored Japan's U16 first goal of the tournament, in a 4–0 win against Malaysia U-16 on 5 October 2008. He made two more appearances in the group stage and helped the national side progress to the quarter–finals of the tournament. Shibasaki appeared in two more matches in the tournament by beating Saudi Arabia U-16 2–0 in the quarter–finals, but lost 2–1 to South Korea U-16 in the semi–finals.

In January 2009, Shibasaki was elected Japan U-17 national team for the first time. He made his Japan U17 debut, starting a match before being substituted in the 55th minute, in a 2–2 draw against Brazil U17 on 25 January 2009. Later in October 2009, Shibasaki was called up to Japan U-17 squad again for the 2009 U-17 World Cup in Nigeria and wore the number 10 shirt for the U-17 side. He played in all three matches, as Japan U-17 were eliminated in the group stage. Six months later, Shibasaki was called up to the Japan U19 squad but never made an appearance for the U-19 side.

=== Senior career ===
In February 2012, Shibasaki was called up to the Japan for the first time ahead of a match against Iceland by Manager Alberto Zaccheroni. However, he appeared as an unused substitute in a match, as Japan won 3–1 on 24 February 2012. Shibasaki's hope of making his debut for the national team continued to be delayed until August 2014 when he was called up.

On 9 September 2014, Shibasaki debuted and scored a goal for Japan national team against Venezuela. In a follow–up match against Jamaica, he played a role that led to Nyron Nosworthy scoring an own goal to give Japan a 1–0 win. After the match, Manager Javier Aguirre praised his performance. He later made two more appearances by the end of 2014.

In December 2014, Shibasaki was elected Japan for 2015 Asian Cup in Australia. After appearing in the first two matches of the tournament as an unused substitute, he made his first appearance, coming on as a late substitute, in a 2–0 win against Jordan on 20 January 2015, which saw Japan through to the next round. Shibasaki's next appearance came against United Arab Emirates in the quarter–finals of the Asian Cup and scored an equalising goal; and the match was played throughout 120 minutes; ultimately, they were eliminated after losing in penalty–shootout (despite Shibasaki, himself, successfully converted the shootout. Two months later on 31 March 2015, he scored his second Japan's goal of his career, in a 5–1 win against Uzbekistan. Five months later, Shibasaki was called up to Japan for the EAFF East Asian Cup in China. He was featured three times in the tournament, as they finished last place.

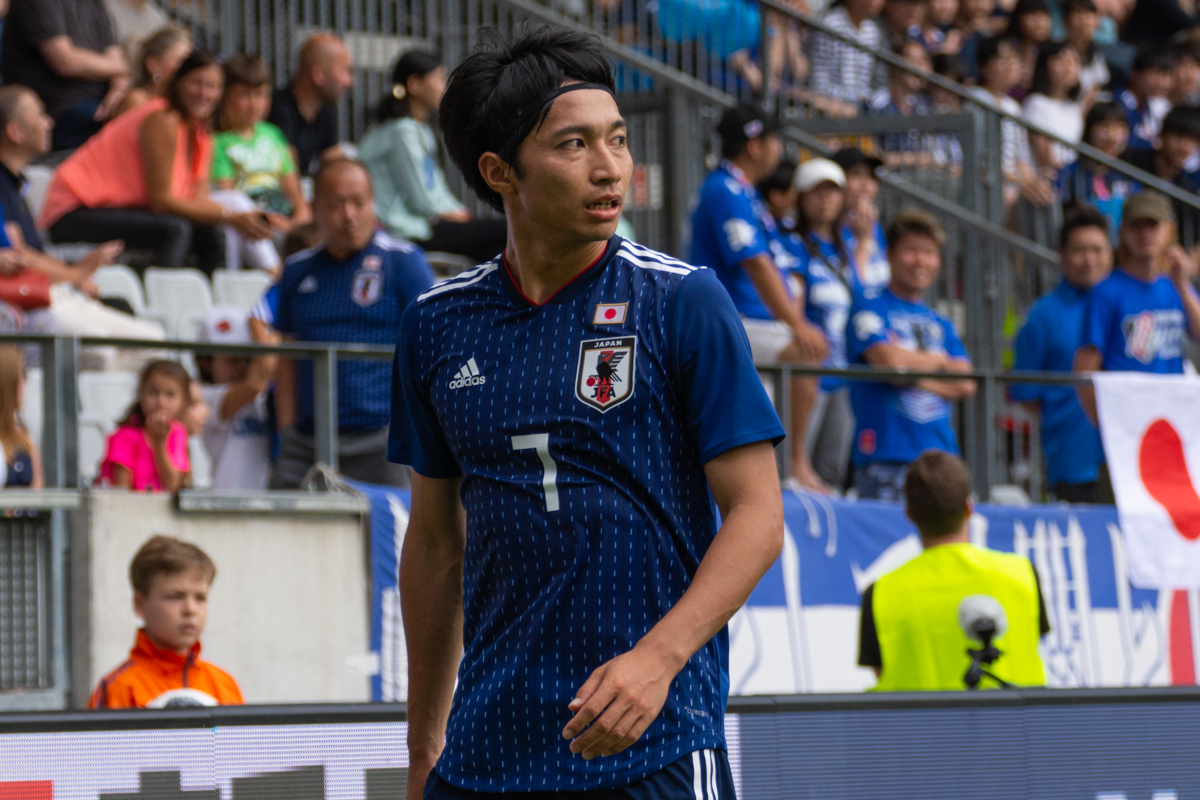
Shibasaki pictured during a friendly match against Paraguay on 8 June 2018.

Two years later away from the national team, Shibasaki was called to Japan's squad and made his first appearance on 5 September 2017 against Saudi Arabia and helped the side win 1–0. Six months later on 28 March 2018, Shibasaki played a role when he set up a goal for Tomoaki Makino, in a 2–1 win against Ukraine. Two months later, he was named in Japan's preliminary squad for the 2018 FIFA World Cup in Russia. Eventually, Shibasaki made it to the final cut of the 23 men squad. Shibasaki made his World Cup debut against Colombia in Matchday 1 of the group stage, where he played 80 minutes in the match, in a 2–1 win. After the match, Manager Akira Nishino praised Shibasaki's performance. He then made two more starts in the World Cup, as Japan progressed through the knockout stage in the tournament. In a match against Belgium in the World Cup Round of 16, Shibasaki set up the opening goal of the game for Genki Haraguchi, as the opposition team later made a comeback in the second half, resulting Japan losing 3–2 and was out of the tournament. Shortly after, Fox Sports named Shibasaki in the Asian's Best Eleven of the tournament.

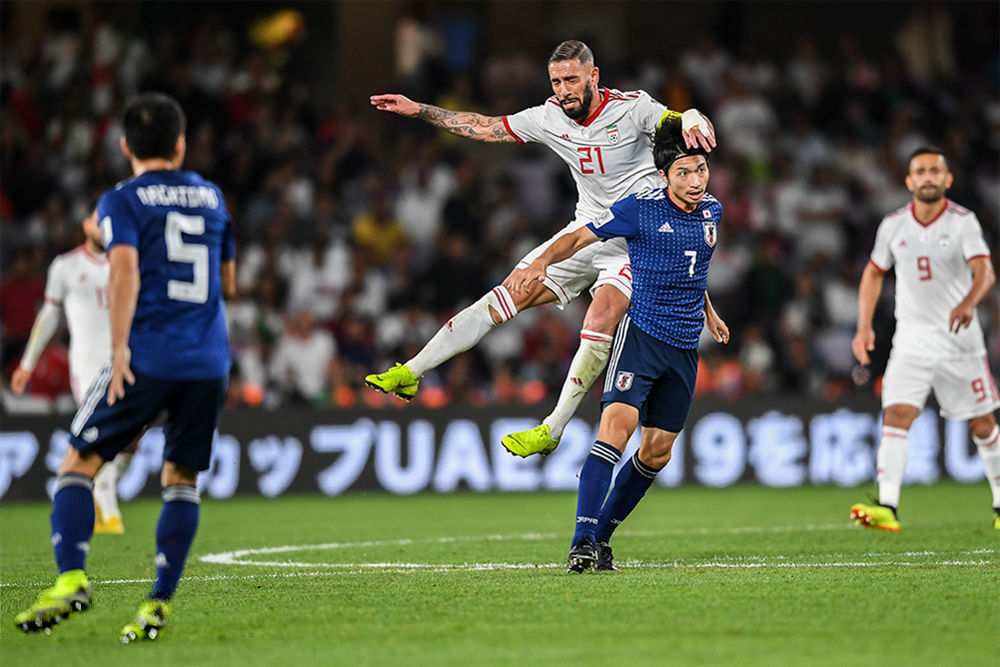
Shibasaki and Iran's Ashkan Dejagah clashed after clearing a ball away during the semi-finals of the AFC Asian Cup.

In December 2018, Shibasaki was one of 23 Japanese players selected for the 2019 AFC Asian Cup. He started his first match of the tournament, starting the whole game and Japan win 3–2 against Turkmenistan. In a match against Saudi Arabia in the Asian Cup Round of 16, Shibasaki set up a goal for Takehiro Tomiyasu, who scored the only goal of the game, resulting in Japan winning 1–0 to progress to the quarter–finals. He later played two more matches of the tournament, which saw the national side reaching the final for the first time since 2011. Shibasaki started in the AFC Asian Cup final against Qatar, as they lost 3–1, finishing as runner–up in the process.

Two months later on 22 March 2019, Shibasaki captained Japan for the first time in his career, as they lost 1–0 against Colombia. Two months later, he was called up to the squad ahead of the Copa América in Brazil. Ahead of the tournament, Shibasaki was appointed as captain for Japan and once captained the national side for the second time, in a 0–0 draw against Trinidad and Tobago on 6 June 2019. He started and captained Japan in all three matches, playing in the centre–midfield position, as they were eliminated in the group stage. After the national team side were eliminated, Shibasaki said: "It was not a bad experience to bring the team together. I personally wanted to prove my ability at these times, and I think it's one of the ways to be a professional when you can do it. Don't let yourself down mentally and spend those periods consciously. I was able to reconfirm that it would be connected to this kind of situation." Following the tournament, Shibasaki started the remaining matches of 2019, including one when he was a captain against Venezuela on 19 November 2019.

Almost a year later, Shibasaki was called up to the Japan squad for a match against Cameroon and Ivory Coast. In a match against Ivory Coast, he played a role in a match by taking a free kick that led to Naomichi Ueda scoring a header, in a 1–0 win for the national team. Shibasaki went on to make three starts for Japan by the end of the year.

== Personal life ==
Shibasaki has two older brothers, whom one of them got him into football. Growing up, Shibasaki said in an interview that his ambition is to become a footballer, having no interests in anything but football. He also idolised Alessandro Del Piero, Francesco Totti and Hidetoshi Nakata. When asked in an interview on how does his improve his concentration before the game, Shibasaki said: "First of all, I start by creating my own world. I create my own senses, spaces, and rhythms. At the same time, I become more focused by being aware of my surroundings. I'm doing something over there, I picked up something and I recognize the movement in the space."

He began a relationship with the actress and singer Erina Mano and their relationship wasn't made public until on 25 November 2017. They were married on 16 July 2018.

In September 2015, it was announced that Shibasaki was appointed as a support leader of the 94th National High School Soccer Championship. In addition to speaking Japanese, he has been learning Galician and acknowledged at Deportivo La Coruña's press conference that his Spanish is not good. Shibasaki also spoke out about living in Spain. In the wake of COVID-19 pandemic, Shibasaki posted a message on his social media account, urging people to stay at home.

== Career statistics ==
=== Club ===
As of 15 January 2025

Appearances and goals by club, season and competition
| Club | Season | League | | | National cup (Note: Includes Emperor's Cup, Copa del Rey) | | League cup (Note: Includes J.League Cup) | | Continental (Note: Includes AFC Champions League) | | Other (Note: Includes Suruga Bank Championship, J.League Championship, FIFA Club World Cup, La Liga play-offs) | | Total | |
| Club | Season | Division | Apps | Goals | Apps | Goals | Apps | Goals | Apps | Goals | Apps | Goals | Apps | Goals |
|---|---|---|---|---|---|---|---|---|---|---|---|---|---|---|
| Kashima Antlers | 2011 | J.League Division 1 | 13 | 0 | 3 | 0 | 3 | 1 | 1 | 0 | — | | 20 | 1 |
| Kashima Antlers | 2012 | J.League Division 1 | 31 | 1 | 4 | 0 | 9 | 3 | — | | 1 | 0 | 45 | 4 |
| Kashima Antlers | 2013 | J.League Division 1 | 34 | 2 | 2 | 0 | 8 | 0 | — | | 1 | 0 | 45 | 2 |
| Kashima Antlers | 2014 | J.League Division 1 | 34 | 6 | 1 | 0 | 6 | 0 | — | | 0 | 0 | 41 | 6 |
| Kashima Antlers | 2015 | J1 League | 29 | 5 | 0 | 0 | 1 | 0 | 6 | 2 | 0 | 0 | 36 | 7 |
| Kashima Antlers | 2016 | J1 League | 31 | 3 | 4 | 1 | 4 | 0 | 0 | 0 | 7 | 2 | 46 | 6 |
| Kashima Antlers | Total | | 172 | 17 | 14 | 1 | 31 | 4 | 7 | 2 | 9 | 2 | 233 | 26 |
| Tenerife | 2016–17 | Segunda División | 12 | 1 | 0 | 0 | — | | — | | 4 | 1 | 16 | 2 |
| Getafe | 2017–18 | La Liga | 22 | 1 | 0 | 0 | — | | — | | — | | 22 | 1 |
| Getafe | 2018–19 | La Liga | 7 | 0 | 2 | 0 | — | | — | | — | | 9 | 0 |
| Getafe | Total | | 29 | 1 | 2 | 0 | — | | — | | — | | 31 | 1 |
| Deportivo La Coruña | 2019–20 | Segunda División | 26 | 0 | 1 | 0 | — | | — | | — | | 27 | 0 |
| Leganés | 2020–21 | Segunda División | 34 | 2 | 1 | 0 | — | | — | | — | | 35 | 2 |
| Leganés | 2021–22 | Segunda División | 34 | 3 | 0 | 0 | — | | — | | — | | 34 | 3 |
| Leganés | 2022–23 | Segunda División | 28 | 0 | 0 | 0 | — | | — | | — | | 28 | 0 |
| Leganés | Total | | 96 | 5 | 1 | 0 | — | | — | | — | | 97 | 5 |
| Kashima Antlers | 2023 | J1 League | 3 | 0 | 0 | 0 | 1 | 0 | — | | — | | 4 | 0 |
| Kashima Antlers | 2024 | J1 League | 22 | 0 | 3 | 0 | 1 | 0 | — | | — | | 26 | 0 |
| Kashima Antlers | Total | | 25 | 0 | 3 | 0 | 2 | 0 | — | | — | | 30 | 0 |
| Career total | | | 360 | 24 | 21 | 1 | 33 | 4 | 7 | 2 | 13 | 3 | 434 | 34 |

=== International ===
As of match played 17 November 2022

Appearances and goals by national team and year
| National team | Year | Apps | Goals |
|---|---|---|---|
| Japan | 2014 | 4 | 1 |
| Japan | 2015 | 9 | 2 |
| Japan | 2016 | 0 | 0 |
| Japan | 2017 | 1 | 0 |
| Japan | 2018 | 12 | 0 |
| Japan | 2019 | 19 | 0 |
| Japan | 2020 | 4 | 0 |
| Japan | 2021 | 6 | 0 |
| Japan | 2022 | 5 | 0 |
| Total | | 60 | 3 |

Scores and results list Japan's goal tally first, score column indicates score after each Shibasaki goal.

List of international goals scored by Gaku Shibasaki
| No. | Date | Venue | Opponent | Score | Result | Competition | Ref. |
|---|---|---|---|---|---|---|---|
| 1 | 9 September 2014 | International Stadium Yokohama, Yokohama, Japan | Venezuela | 2–1 | 2–2 | Friendly | |
| 2 | 23 January 2015 | Stadium Australia, Sydney, Australia | United Arab Emirates | 1–1 | 1–1 (4–5 p) | 2015 AFC Asian Cup | |
| 3 | 31 March 2015 | Ajinomoto Stadium, Chōfu, Japan | Uzbekistan | 3–0 | 5–1 | Friendly | |

== Honours ==
Kashima Antlers

- J1 League: 2016, 2025
- J.League Cup: 2011, 2012
- Emperor's Cup: 2016
- Suruga Bank Championship: 2012, 2013
- FIFA Club World Cup runner-up: 2016

Japan

- AFC Asian Cup runner-up: 2019

Individual

- J. League Cup MVP: 2012
- J. League Rookie of the Year: 2012
- J1 League Monthly MVP: August 2014
- FIFA Club World Cup Bronze Ball: 2016
- AFC Asian Cup Team of the Tournament: 2019
