= 2012 J.League Cup final =

Kashima Antlers	Shimizu S-Pulse
2	1
- Date: November 3, 2012
- Venue: National Stadium, Tokyo

2012 J.League Cup final was the 20th final of the J.League Cup competition. The final was played at National Stadium in Tokyo on November 3, 2012. Kashima Antlers won the championship.

== Match details ==
November 3, 2012

Kashima Antlers	2–1 (a.e.t.)	Shimizu S-Pulse
Shibasaki 73' (pen.), 93'	Report	Omae 77' (pen.)

National Stadium

Kashima Antlers
GK	21	(Japan) Hitoshi Sogahata
DF	22	(Japan) Daigo Nishi
DF	3	(Japan) Daiki Iwamasa
DF	15	(Japan) Takeshi Aoki
DF	23	(Japan) Gen Shoji	(substituted off) 83'
MF	16	(Japan) Takuya Honda	(substituted off) 70'
MF	40	(Japan) Mitsuo Ogasawara
MF	20	(Japan) Gaku Shibasaki
MF	25	(Japan) Yasushi Endo
FW	13	(Japan) Shinzo Koroki	(substituted off) 46'
FW	9	(Japan) Yuya Osako
Substitutes:
GK	1	(Japan) Akihiro Sato
DF	6	(Japan) Koji Nakata
DF	7	(Japan) Toru Araiba	(substituted on) 83'
MF	14	(Japan) Chikashi Masuda	(substituted on) 70'
MF	10	(Japan) Masashi Motoyama
MF	11	(Brazil) Dutra	(substituted on) 46'
FW	8	(Brazil) Juninho
Manager:
(Brazil) Jorginho

Shimizu S-Pulse
GK	31	(Japan) Akihiro Hayashi
DF	28	(Japan) Yutaka Yoshida
DF	3	(Japan) Yasuhiro Hiraoka
DF	4	(Netherlands) Calvin Jong-a-Pin
DF	33	(South Korea) Lee Ki-je
MF	17	(Japan) Yosuke Kawai	(substituted off) 64'
MF	2	(Japan) Taisuke Muramatsu	(substituted off) 96'
MF	16	(Japan) Kohei Hattanda	(substituted off) 90+1'
FW	11	(Japan) Genki Omae
FW	35	(South Korea) Kim Hyun-sung
FW	13	(Japan) Toshiyuki Takagi
Substitutes:
GK	1	(Japan) Kaito Yamamoto
DF	36	(Japan) Kiyotaka Miyoshi
MF	10	(Japan) Daigo Kobayashi	(substituted on) 64'
MF	32	(Japan) Hideki Ishige	(substituted on) 90+1'
FW	23	(Japan) Ryohei Shirasaki
FW	27	(Japan) Atomu Nabeta
FW	34	(Japan) Yuji Senuma	(substituted on) 96'
Manager:
(Iran) Afshin Ghotbi

== See also ==
- 2012 J.League Cup
