= 2015 J.League Cup final =

Kashima Antlers	Gamba Osaka
3	0
- Date: October 31, 2015
- Venue: Saitama Stadium 2002, Saitama

2015 J.League Cup final was the 23rd final of the J.League Cup competition. The final was played at Saitama Stadium 2002 in Saitama on October 31, 2015. Kashima Antlers won the championship.

== Match details ==
October 31, 2015

Kashima Antlers	3–0	Gamba Osaka
Hwang Seok-ho 60'; Mu Kanazaki 84'; Caio 86'	Report

Saitama Stadium 2002

Kashima Antlers
GK	21	(Japan) Hitoshi Sogahata
DF	22	(Japan) Daigo Nishi
DF	14	(South Korea) Hwang Seok-ho
DF	3	(Japan) Gen Shoji
DF	16	(Japan) Shuto Yamamoto
MF	20	(Japan) Gaku Shibasaki
MF	40	(Japan) Mitsuo Ogasawara
MF	25	(Japan) Yasushi Endo	(substituted off) 66'
MF	13	(Japan) Atsutaka Nakamura	(substituted off) 69'
FW	33	(Japan) Mu Kanazaki
FW	18	(Japan) Shuhei Akasaki	(substituted off) 81'
Substitutes:
GK	1	(Japan) Akihiro Sato
DF	4	(Japan) Kazuya Yamamura	(substituted in) 81'
DF	5	(Japan) Takeshi Aoki
MF	7	(Brazil) Caio	(substituted in) 66'
MF	10	(Japan) Masashi Motoyama
FW	19	(Japan) Yuta Toyokawa
FW	34	(Japan) Yuma Suzuki	(substituted in) 69'
Manager:
(Japan) Masatada Ishii

Gamba Osaka
GK	1	(Japan) Masaaki Higashiguchi
DF	14	(Japan) Koki Yonekura
DF	3	(Japan) Takaharu Nishino	(substituted off) 30'
DF	5	(Japan) Daiki Niwa
DF	4	(Japan) Hiroki Fujiharu
MF	15	(Japan) Yasuyuki Konno
MF	7	(Japan) Yasuhito Endo
MF	13	(Japan) Hiroyuki Abe	(substituted off) 65'
MF	39	(Japan) Takashi Usami
MF	11	(Japan) Shu Kurata	(substituted off) 78'
FW	29	(Brazil) Patric
Substitutes:
GK	18	(Japan) Yosuke Fujigaya
DF	8	(Japan) Keisuke Iwashita	(substituted in) 30'
DF	22	(South Korea) Oh Jae-suk
MF	10	(Japan) Takahiro Futagawa
MF	19	(Japan) Kotaro Omori	(substituted in) 65'
MF	21	(Japan) Yosuke Ideguchi
FW	9	(Brazil) Lins	(substituted in) 78'
Manager:
(Japan) Kenta Hasegawa

== See also ==
- 2015 J.League Cup
