= 2011 J.League Cup final =

2011 J. League Cup final
Urawa Red Diamonds	Kashima Antlers
0	1
- After Extra Time
- Date: 29 October 2011
- Venue: Tokyo National Stadium, Tokyo
- Referee: Minoru Tojo

The 2011 J. League Cup final was the 20th final of the J. League Cup competition. The final was played at Tokyo National Stadium in Tokyo on 29 October 2011. The match was contested between the Urawa Red Diamonds who were defeated by the Kashima Antlers in extra time.

== Route to the final ==
=== Urawa Red Diamonds ===
Round	Opposition	Score
1st	Montedio Yamagata	2–0
1st	Montedio Yamagata	2–1
2nd	Omiya Ardija	2–0
2nd	Omiya Ardija	2–1
Quarter-final	Cerezo Osaka (a)	1–2
Semi-final	Gamba Osaka (h)	2–1

=== Kashima Antlers ===
Round	Opposition	Score
Quarter-final	Yokohama F. Marinos (h)	3–2
Semi-final	Nagoya Grampus (a)	1–2 (a.e.t.)

== Match ==
29 October 2011
13:10

Urawa Red Diamonds	0–1 (a.e.t.)	Kashima Antlers
	Report	Osako 105'

Tokyo National Stadium, Tokyo
Attendance: 46,599
Referee: Minoru Tojo

URAWA RED DIAMONDS:
GK	18	Nobuhiro Kato
DF	6	Nobuhisa Yamada		(substituted off) 107'
DF	26	Mizuki Hamada
DF	17	Mitsuru Nagata
DF	14	Tadaaki Hirakawa
MF	13	Keita Suzuki		(substituted off) 91'
MF	7	Tsukasa Umesaki	(yellow card) 12',	(substituted off) 76'
MF	22	Naoki Yamada	(yellow card) 47' (yellow-red card) 50'
MF	8	Yosuke Kashiwagi
MF	24	Genki Haraguchi
FW	15	Sergio Escudero
Substitutes:
GK	1	Norihiro Yamagishi
DF	2	Keisuke Tsuboi		(substituted on) 107'
DF	4	Matthew Špiranović
DF	28	Takuya Okamoto
MF	5	Shunki Takahashi	(yellow card) 99',	(substituted on) 76'
MF	27	Shuto Kojima		(substituted on) 91'
FW	31	Ranko Despotović
Manager:
Takafumi Hori

KASHIMA ANTLERS:
GK	21	Hitoshi Sogahata	(yellow card) 120+1'
DF	7	Toru Araiba
DF	15	Takeshi Aoki	(yellow card) 43' (yellow-red card) 80'
DF	6	Koji Nakata
DF	5	Alex	(yellow card) 31'	(substituted off) 76'
MF	20	Gaku Shibasaki
MF	40	Mitsuo Ogasawara		(substituted off) 91'
MF	8	Takuya Nozawa
MF	25	Yasushi Endo		(substituted off) 63'
FW	9	Yuya Osako
FW	13	Shinzo Koroki
Substitutes:
GK	1	Tetsu Sugiyama
DF	22	Daigo Nishi
DF	23	Gen Shoji
MF	10	Masashi Motoyama
MF	11	Fellype Gabriel		(substituted on) 76'
MF	14	Chikashi Masuda		(substituted on) 91'
FW	30	Yuzo Tashiro		(substituted on) 63'
Manager:
Oswaldo de Oliveira

Assistant referees:
Haruhiro Otsuka
Tadaomi Aiba Match Rules

- 90 minutes.
- 2 halves of extra-time if necessary.
- Penalty shootout if scores still level.
- Seven named substitutes.
- Maximum of 3 substitutions.

== See also ==
- 2011 J.League Cup
