= Yukitoshi =

- Pronunciation: jɯkʲitoɕi (IPA)
- Gender: Male

Origin
- Origin: Japanese
- Meaning: Different meanings depending on the kanji used

Other names
- Alternative spelling: Yukitosi (Kunrei-shiki) Yukitosi (Nihon-shiki) Yukitoshi (Hepburn)

Yukitoshi is a masculine Japanese given name.

== Written forms ==
Yukitoshi can be written using different combinations of kanji characters. Some examples:

- 幸敏, "happiness, agile"
- 幸俊, "happiness, sagacious"
- 幸寿, "happiness, long life"
- 幸利, "happiness, benefit"
- 行敏, "to go, agile"
- 行俊, "to go, sagacious"
- 行寿, "to go, long life"
- 之敏, "of, agile"
- 之年, "of, filial piety"
- 志敏, "determination, agile"
- 志俊, "determination, sagacious"
- 恭敏, "respectful, agile"
- 恭俊, "respectful, sagacious"
- 雪年, "snow, year"
- 雪寿, "snow, long life"

The name can also be written in hiragana ゆきとし or katakana ユキトシ.

== Notable people with the name ==
- Yukitoshi Hori (堀 之紀; born 1952), Japanese voice actor
- Yukitoshi Ito (伊東 幸敏; born 1993), Japanese footballer

== Fictional characters ==
- Yukitoshi Shimizu (清水 幸利), from anime and manga Arifureta: From Commonplace to World's Strongest
- Yukitoshi Isaka (伊坂 幸寿), from anime and manga Dokumushi
