= Akihiro Sato =

Akihiro Sato may refer to:

- Akihiro Sato (footballer, born August 1986) (佐藤 昭大), Japanese footballer
- Akihiro Sato (footballer, born October 1986) (佐藤 晃大), Japanese footballer
- Akihiro Sato (model), Brazilian model
