= 2015 Kashima Antlers season =

Kashima Antlers
2015 season
- Manager: Toninho Cerezo; Masatada Ishii
- Stadium: Kashima Soccer Stadium
- J1 League: 5th

During the 2015 season, Kashima Antlers competed in the J1 League, in which they finished 5th.

== J1 League ==
=== League table ===
Pos	Team	Pld	W	D	L	GF	GA	GD	Pts	Qualification or relegation
3	Gamba Osaka	34	18	9	7	56	37	+19	63	Champions League group stage and J.League Championship 1st Round
4	FC Tokyo	34	19	6	9	45	33	+12	63	Champions League qualifying play-off (Note: The winner of the 2015 Emperor's Cup qualified for the Group Stage of the 2016 AFC Champions League. Since the Emperor's Cup winner was Gamba Osaka who were the third-placed team, the qualifying play-off spot was awarded to the fourth-placed team.)
5	Kashima Antlers	34	18	5	11	57	41	+16	59	
6	Kawasaki Frontale	34	17	6	11	62	48	+14	57	
7	Yokohama F. Marinos	34	15	10	9	45	32	+13	55	

Updated to match(es) played on 28 November 2015. Source: Meiji Yasuda J1 League Standings
Rules for classification: 1) Points; 2) Goal difference; 3) Goals scored

=== Matches ===
J.League Division 1 results
Match	Date	Team	Venue	Score	Attendance
1–1	8 March 2015	Shimizu S-Pulse	Away	1–3	19,736
1–2	14 March 2015	Shonan Bellmare	Home	1–2	17,295
1–3	22 March 2015	Nagoya Grampus	Away	1–1	16,053
1–4	3 April 2015	Sagan Tosu	Home	3–1	8,539
1–5	12 April 2015	Albirex Niigata	Home	1–1	10,261
1–6	16 April 2015	Kashiwa Reysol	Away	3–1	10,076
1–7	25 April 2015	Vissel Kobe	Home	1–2	12,275
1–8	29 April 2015	Vegalta Sendai	Away	2–1	17,011
1–9	2 May 2015	Ventforet Kofu	Home	0–1	15,340
1–11	10 May 2015	FC Tokyo	Away	1–0	42,070
1–12	16 May 2015	Sanfrecce Hiroshima	Home	2–2	13,523
1–13	23 May 2015	Urawa Reds	Away	1–2	41,269
1–14	30 May 2015	Matsumoto Yamaga FC	Home	3–1	17,155
1–10	3 June 2015	Gamba Osaka	Away	0–2	13,110
1–15	7 June 2015	Montedio Yamagata	Away	2–2	13,241
1–16	20 June 2015	Yokohama F. Marinos	Away	3–0	28,928
1–17	27 June 2015	Kawasaki Frontale	Home	2–3	13,867
2–1	11 July 2015	Albirex Niigata	Away	3–2	24,316
2–2	15 July 2015	Shimizu S-Pulse	Home	0–0	6,923
2–3	19 July 2015	Matsumoto Yamaga FC	Away	0–2	17,625
2–4	25 July 2015	FC Tokyo	Home	2–1	17,804
2–5	29 July 2015	Sagan Tosu	Away	3–0	15,794
2–6	12 August 2015	Sanfrecce Hiroshima	Away	1–0	16,689
2–7	16 August 2015	Vegalta Sendai	Home	3–2	16,554
2–8	22 August 2015	Montedio Yamagata	Home	3–0	16,700
2–9	29 August 2015	Kawasaki Frontale	Away	3–1	22,632
2–10	12 September 2015	Gamba Osaka	Home	1–2	22,380
2–11	19 September 2015	Ventforet Kofu	Away	1–0	12,131
2–12	26 September 2015	Urawa Reds	Home	1–2	29,030
2–13	3 October 2015	Vissel Kobe	Away	2–0	16,871
2–14	17 October 2015	Kashiwa Reysol	Home	3–2	13,633
2–15	24 October 2015	Shonan Bellmare	Away	1–2	14,227
2–16	7 November 2015	Yokohama F. Marinos	Home	2–0	22,755
2–17	22 November 2015	Nagoya Grampus	Home	1–0	25,151
