= Kiyotaka Miyoshi =

Japanese footballer

Personal information
- Full name: Kiyotaka Miyoshi
- Date of birth: July 10, 1985 (age 41)
- Place of birth: Tokyo, Japan
- Height: 1.80 m (5 ft 11 in)
- Position: Defender

Youth career
- 2004–2007: Asia University

Senior career*
Years	Team	Apps	(Gls)
2008–2009	Argentino de Rosario	0	(0)
2010–2012	Boston River	35	(3)
2012	Shimizu S-Pulse	3	(0)
2013	Boston River	3	(0)
Total		41	(3)
Medal record
Shimizu S-Pulse
Runner-up	J.League Cup	2012
- * Club domestic league appearances and goals

Kiyotaka Miyoshi (三吉 聖王, Miyoshi Kiyotaka; born July 10, 1985) is a former Japanese football player.

== Career ==
=== Early years ===
Born in Tokyo, and after receiving as professor of History and Religion, Miyoshi went to Argentina to try their luck, because he wanted to devote himself fully to football. He was given an opportunity through Martín Cardetti business group, so in 2008 he went to Estudiantes de la Plata, a prestigious team, not only in Argentina but in South America, but we lacked opportunities. In the first half of 2009, he look for chances in Arsenal de Sarandí and at the end of 2009 he went to Argentino de Rosario, playing in the Primera D, but unfortunately he was not taken into account, so he only trained with the team.

=== Boston River ===
In mid-2010, Miyoshi signed for Uruguayan Segunda División side Boston River, where he made a total of 35 appearances and scored three goals.

=== Shimizu S-Pulse ===
In mid-2012, he was transferred to J1 League side Shimizu S-Pulse.
