= Takahide Umebachi =

Japanese footballer (born 1992)

Takahide Umebachi 梅鉢 貴秀
Personal information
- Full name: Takahide Umebachi
- Date of birth: 8 June 1992 (age 34)
- Place of birth: Takatsuki, Osaka, Japan
- Height: 1.76 m (5 ft 9 in)
- Position: Midfielder

Youth career
- 2008–2010: Kansai University Dai-ichi; Senior High School

Senior career*
Years	Team	Apps	(Gls)
2011–2017	Kashima Antlers	27	(2)
2016	→ Montedio Yamagata (loan)	4	(0)
2018–2019	Zweigen Kanazawa	32	(0)
2020–2022	SC Sagamihara	59	(2)
2023–2025	Sutherland Sharks	59	(3)
Medal record
Kashima Antlers
Runner-up	J1 League	2017
Winner	J.League Cup	2011
Winner	J.League Cup	2012
Winner	J.League Cup	2015
- * Club domestic league appearances and goals as of 26 June 2025

Takahide Umebachi (梅鉢 貴秀, Umebachi Takahide; born 8 June 1992) is a Japanese football player, who last played as a defender for the Sutherland Sharks in the National Premier Leagues NSW competition.

== Career statistics ==
=== Club ===
Updated to end of 2018 season.

Club	Season	League		Emperor's Cup		J. League Cup		AFC		Other^{1}		Total	
Club	Season	Apps	Goals	Apps	Goals	Apps	Goals	Apps	Goals	Apps	Goals	Apps	Goals
Kashima Antlers	2011	0	0	0	0	0	0	0	0	-		0	0
Kashima Antlers	2012	4	0	1	0	3	0	-		0	0	8	0
Kashima Antlers	2013	10	2	2	0	2	0	-		1	0	15	2
Kashima Antlers	2014	5	0	0	0	4	1	-		-		9	1
Kashima Antlers	2015	8	0	1	0	1	0	3	0	-		13	0
Montedio Yamagata	2016	4	0	0	0	-		-		-		4	0
Kashima Antlers	2017	0	0	1	0	0	0	1	0	-		2	0
Zweigen Kanazawa	2018	24	0	1	0	-		-		-		25	0
Total		55	2	6	0	10	1	4	0	1	0	76	3

^{1}Includes Suruga Bank Championship.

== Honours ==
=== Club ===
Kashima Antlers

- J. League Cup (3) : 2011, 2012, 2015
- Suruga Bank Championship (2) : 2012, 2013
