= Gen Shoji =

Japanese footballer (born 1992)

Gen Shōji 昌子 源
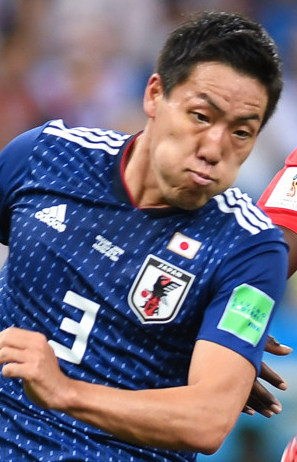
- Shoji with Japan at the 2018 FIFA World Cup

Personal information
- Full name: Gen Shōji
- Date of birth: 11 December 1992 (age 33)
- Place of birth: Kobe, Japan
- Height: 1.82 m (6 ft 0 in)
- Position: Centre-back

Team information
- Current team: Machida Zelvia
- Number: 3

Youth career
- 2008–2010: Yonago Kita High School

Senior career*
Years	Team	Apps	(Gls)
2011–2018	Kashima Antlers	160	(8)
2019–2020	Toulouse	19	(0)
2020–2022	Gamba Osaka	71	(1)
2023	Kashima Antlers	21	(0)
2024–	Machida Zelvia	91	(5)

International career^{‡}
2015–2021	Japan	20	(1)
Medal record
Kashima Antlers
Winner	AFC Champions League	2018
Winner	J1 League	2016
Runner-up	J1 League	2017
Winner	J.League Cup	2011
Winner	J.League Cup	2012
Winner	J.League Cup	2015
Winner	Emperor's Cup	2016
Gamba Osaka
Runner-up	J1 League	2020
Runner-up	Emperor's Cup	2020
FC Machida Zelvia
Winner	Emperor's Cup	2025
Men's football
Representing Japan
EAFF Championship
Runner-up	2017 Japan	Team
- * Club domestic league appearances and goals as of 9 August 2026 ‡ National team caps and goals as of 15 June 2021, 12:22 (UTC)

Gen Shōji (昌子 源, Shōji Gen; born 11 December 1992) is a Japanese professional footballer who plays as a centre-back for J1 League club Machida Zelvia.

A strong and physical centre-back, Shoji is known for his pace, positioning, and ability to handle one-on-one defensive situations.

== Club career ==
=== Kashima Antlers ===
Born in Kobe, Japan, Shōji started playing football when he was two years old, starting out in a forward position. His performance when he was in fourth grade playing against the sixth grade attracted attention from Fresca Kobe U12 (Hyogo Prefecture), who signed him. He joined Gamba Osaka Junior Youth during middle school and then Yonago Kita High School. While at Yonago Kita High School, Shoji switched to playing in the centre–back position, a position he played today. At first, Shoji was unhappy with the team's decision to switch him into the centre–back position, but over time, he accepted playing in the position.

It was announced on 30 September 2010 that Shoji would be joining Kashima Antlers from 1 January 2011. Ahead of the 2011 season, Shoji was registered to the Kashima Antlers’ first team in January. He spoke about his expectations at his new club, saying: "In 2011, I want to work hard without losing, so that the directors and supporters can recognize me. I want to try out what I can do. I want to do my best to help my team." He first appeared in the first team for Kashima Antlers as an unused substitute, in a 1–1 draw against Suwon Samsung Bluewings in the AFC Champions League. From that moment on, Shoji spent months on the substitute bench, due to Daiki Iwamasa, Takeshi Aoki and Masahiko Inoha. On 12 October 2011 he made his Kashima Antlers debut, starting the whole game, in a 2–0 win against University of Tsukuba in the second round of the J. League Cup. A month later on 16 November 2011 against Kataller Toyama, Shoji made another appearance for the side, playing 62 minutes, in a 2–1 win. At the end of the 2011 season, Shoji made two appearances for the side.

In the 2012 season, Shoji continued to remain on the substitute bench, as Iwamasa and Aoki were the first choice centre–backs. On 24 March 2012 he made his first appearance of the season, coming on as a 76th-minute substitute in a 2–0 loss against Sanfrecce Hiroshima. A month later, Shoji made his first start of the season, playing in the centre–back position, as he helped Kashima Antlers beat Hokkaido Consadole Sapporo in the J.League group stage. Over the season, Shoji then played in different positions, such as, defensive midfield, left–back and right–back, but most of them were substitute. On 8 September 2012 he scored his first Kashima Antlers’ goal, in a 7–1 win against University of Tsukuba in the second round of the Emperor's Cup. Two months later on 3 November 2012, Shoji started in the left–back position for the J.League Cup Final against Shimizu S-Pulse and played 83 minutes before being substituted, as Kashima Antlers won 2–1, his first title of his career. After the match, Manager Jorginho evaluated his performance. At the end of the 2012 season, he went on to make eighteen appearances and scoring once in all competitions.

In the 2013 season, Shoji made his first appearance of the season, coming on as a 77th-minute substitute, in a 3–2 win against Vegalta Sendai on 9 March 2013. However, his first team opportunities was limited, due to competitions from Iwamasa, Aoki and new signing, Takanori Maeno. Despite this, Shoji made his first league start, starting the whole game, in a 3–2 win against FC Tokyo on 25 May 2013. By June, he suffered a meniscus damage while training and was sidelined for four months, eventually ruling him out for the rest of the season. Despite this, Shoji went on to make five appearances for the side at the end of the 2013 season.

In the 2014 season, Shoji returned to the starting line-up against Ventforet Kofu in the opening game of the season and scored from a header, in a 4–0 win. This was followed up by helping the side keep two clean sheets in the next two matches. His contribution to the first team helped the side finish at the top of the table. However, as the season progressed, the club's place at the top of the table soon slipped. By September, Shoji scored his second goal of the season, in a 2–1 loss against Omiya Ardija on 13 September 2014. This was followed by keeping three clean sheets in the next three matches. The 2014 season proved to be Shoji's breakthrough to the Kashima Anthlers’ first team, and cemented his place in the centre–back position. At the end of the season, he went on to make forty appearances and scoring two times in all competitions.

In the 2015 season, Shoji made his AFC Champions League debut, starting the whole game, as Kashima Anthlers lost 1–0 against Western Sydney Wanderers. However, he fractured his hand and was sidelined for weeks. On 22 March 2015 Shoji returned to the starting line-up, starting the whole game, in a 1–1 draw against Nagoya Grampus. Since returning to the first team, he continued to regain his first team place for the side. On 29 April 2015 Shoji scored his first goal of the season, in a 2–1 win against Vegalta Sendai. By mid–May, he began to play in the left–back position from May to June. On 11 July 2015 Shoji scored his second goal of the season, in a 3–2 win against Albirex Niigata. Two weeks later on 25 July 2015, he scored his third goal of the season, in a 2–1 win against FC Tokyo However, Shoji suffered an injury in the 20th minute and had to be substituted during a 2–2 draw against FC Tokyo in the quarter–finals of the J. League Cup first leg. On 26 September 2015 he returned from injury, starting the whole match, in a 2–1 loss against Urawa Red Diamonds. A month later, Shoji played in both legs against Vissel Kobe in the semi–finals of the J.League Cup and helped the side reach the final after winning 6–2 on aggregate. In the J.League Cup against Gamba Osaka, he started the match and helped the side with a clean sheet by beating them 3–0 to win the tournament. Following the tournament, Shoji helped the side keep two more clean sheets in the last two remaining league matches of the season. At the end of the 2015 season, he went on to make thirty–eight appearances and scoring three times in all competitions.

In the 2016 season, Shoji started the season when he helped Kashima Antlers keep two clean sheets in the first two league matches of the season. Since the start of the season, Shoji continued to regain his first team place, playing in the centre–back position. On 6 April 2016 he scored his first goal of the season, in a 3–1 win against Nagoya Grampus in the J.League Cup. By the end of the J.League first stage, Shoji's contribution to the first team helped the side finish at the top of the table. After serving a one match suspension, he made his return to the starting line-up, as Kashima Antlers lost 3–1 loss against Gamba Osaka on 2 July 2016. Shoji continued to help the side remain at the top of the table for the next eleven matches. On 16 September 2016 he scored his second goal of the season, in a 3–0 win against Júbilo Iwata. At some point around this month, he signed a contract with the club. Following the club's qualification to finish third place at the end of the J.League second stage, Shoji later helped the club win the league after playing both legs to beat Urawa Red Diamonds 2–2 on aggregate through away goal. Shoji played all the four matches in the FIFA Club World Cup, as he helped Kashima Antlers reach the final, only to lose 4–2 against Real Madrid. Despite losing in the final, both Shoji and Naomichi Ueda's centre-back partnership were praised by the media, both in and outside of Japan. Shoji also helped the club reach the Emperor's Cup Final by beating Kawasaki Frontale 2–1. At the end of the 2016 season, he went on to make forty–five appearances and scoring two times in all competitions. For his performance in the 2016 season, Shoji was named J.League Best XI.

In the 2017 season, Shoji started the whole match against Urawa Red Diamonds in the Japanese Super Cup, as he helped Kashima Antlers win 3–2 to win the trophy. Shoji then helped the side keep three clean sheets in three matches between 4 March 2017 and 14 March 2017. A month later on 30 April 2017, he scored his first goal of the season, to make amends from giving away a penalty earlier in the game, in a 2–1 win against Sagan Tosu. His performance attracted interests from Bundesliga side Werder Bremen, but Shoji was quoted saying: "it may end with interest." Amid to a transfer move, Shoji captained the side for the first time in his Kashima Antlers’ career, as they lost 2–1 against Vissel Kobe on 14 May 2017. He then captained the side for the next three out of the four matches throughout May and early–June. Shoji further captained the side on numerous occasions throughout the 2017 season. He, once again, helped Kashima Antlers keep three clean sheets between 19 August 2017 and 9 September 2017. Shoji then scored his second goal of the season against Vissel Kobe in the quarter–finals of the Emperor's Cup, as they lost 5–4 in the penalty shoot–out (which he, himself, successfully converted a penalty) after the game finished 1–1 throughout extra time. Shoji later helped Kashima Antlers keep three clean sheets in the last three remaining matches but the club finished second place behind Kawasaki Frontale. Following this, Shoji said he was determined to help the club win a trophy next season. For his performance in the 2017 season, Shoji was named J.League Best XI for the second time in his career. Having played every match at the end of the 2017 season, Shoji went on to make forty–six appearances and scoring two times in all competitions.

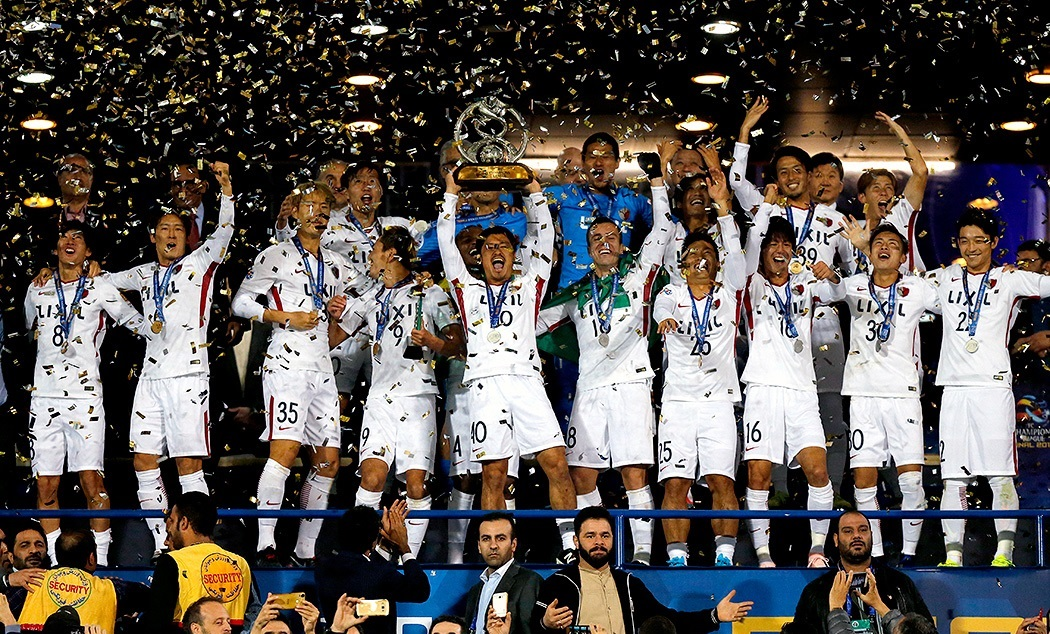
Shoji lifting the AFC Champions League trophy following a 2–0 win on aggregate against Persepolis.

In the 2018 season, Shoji helped Kashima Antlers keep two clean sheets in the first two league matches of the season. He then captained the side for the next three matches between 13 March 2018 and 31 March 2018. However, Shoji suffered a calf injury that saw him miss two matches. On 14 April 2018 he returned to the starting line-up from injury, in a 2–0 win against Nagoya Grampus. However, Shoji's return was short–lived when he was sent–off for a second bookable offence, in a 4–1 loss against Kawasaki Frontale in a follow–up match. Shoji returned from suspension, appearing in the starting line–up against V-Varen Nagasaki on 2 May 2018 and helped them win 2–1. Following the World Cup, Shoji's performance during the tournament attracted interests from clubs around Europe, but he responded to the transfer speculation by stating he wanted to stay at Kashima Antlers. On 22 July 2018 Shoji made his return to the starting line-up as captain against Kashiwa Reysol and led the side to win 6–2. However, his return was short–lived when he suffered ankle injury and had to be substituted in the 41st minute during a 2–0 win against Cerezo Osaka on 25 July 2018. Initially out for three weeks, Shoji was eventually sidelined for three months. On 14 October 2018 he returned from injury, coming on as a late substitute in a 2–2 draw against Yokohama F. Marinos in the second leg of the J. League Cup semi–finals, resulting Kashima Antlers’ elimination. Ten days later on 24 October 2018 against Suwon Samsung Bluewings in the second leg of the AFC Champions League semi–finals, Shoji captained the side and led them to a 3–3 draw, resulting Kashima Antlers reaching the AFC Champions League Final for the first time. He then played in both legs of the AFC Champions League Final against Persepolis and led the side by beating them 2–0 aggregate to win the club's first AFC Champions League trophy. On 24 November 2018 Shoji scored his first goal of the season, in a 3–0 win against Vegalta Sendai. He later appeared twice during the FIFA Club World Cup, as they finished fourth place in the tournament. At the end of the 2018 season, Shoji went on to make thirty appearances and scoring once in all competitions.

=== Toulouse FC ===
In November 2018, Shoji continued to be linked a move away from Kashima Antlers, as it was reported that Toulouse interested in signing him. It was announced on 29 December 2018 that he signed for Toulouse, signing a three–year contract for a transfer fee of 3 million euros and becoming the first Japanese player to join the club. Upon joining the club, Shoji said he will do his best at Toulouse and learn the speak the French language as quickly as possible.

Shoji made his Toulouse debut, starting the whole game and keeping a clean sheet, in a 1–0 win against Nîmes Olympique on 19 January 2019. He kept another clean sheet in a follow–up match against Angers SCO, as they drew 0–0. Since joining the club, Shoji became a first team regular for the club, playing in the centre–back position. Manager Alain Casanova described Shoji's signings as a "very good pick" after watching his performance but expected him to improve. Shoji was able to help to help the club avoid relegation despite bad results. At the end of the 2018–19 season, he made twenty appearances in all competitions.

Ahead of the 2019–20 season, however, Shoji suffered a hamstring injury during a pre–season match in a 1–0 defeat against Norwich City and was sidelined for a month. On 6 September 2019 he returned from injury, appearing in a friendly match against Athletic Bilbao. On 25 September 2019 Shoji made his first league appearance of the season and started the match, as Toulouse lost 2–0 against Angers SCO. However, Shoji played 45 minutes, as he sprained his ankle and was substituted. This turns out to be his only appearance for the club this season. Initially out for three weeks, Shoji was sidelined for months and never played for Toulouse again. It was reported in late–January that Toulouse accepted a bid from Gamba Osaka for Shoji. Upon leaving the club, it was reported that Shoji wanted to leave the club, having failed to settle in France and later stated it was a difficult decision to leave.

=== Gamba Osaka ===
It was announced on 3 February 2020 that Gamba Osaka signed Shoji on a five–year contract for a reported transfer fee of 850,000 euros. Upon joining the club, he said: "I'm coming back to Gamba Osaka. I was taken care of by junior youth, and after that I was fighting as a rival with a different team, but I'm grateful to be back this time. I'm just thinking about leaving results here, and I'm trying to help the team win the championship, or I'm going to pull it, so I'll do my best so that I can do it."

However, Shoji continued to recover from his ankle injury for the next five months, but the season was interrupted due to the pandemic and it was pushed back to July, allowing him to have more time to recover. Having recovered from his injury, he made his debut for the club against Yokohama on 8 August 2020 and started the whole game, as Gamba Osaka won 2–1. Since making his debut for Gamba Osaka, Shoji quickly established himself in the starting eleven, playing in the centre–back position for the next two months. This lasted until he suffered ankle injury in the 17th minute but continued playing, as the club drew 1–1 against Yokohama F. Marinos on 14 October 2020. After the match, Shoji was sidelined for a month with ankle injury. While on the sidelines, he was awarded October's J-League Best Defensive Player. On 14 November 2020 Shoji returned to the starting line–up for Gamba Osaka against Vegalta Sendai, as the club lost 4–0. He later helped Gamba Osaka finish second place in the league. At the end of the 2020 season, Shoji went on to make nineteen appearances in all competitions.

=== Return to Kashima Antlers ===
On 8 December 2022, Shōji returned to his former club, Kashima Antlers for the 2023 season. He was named in the starting XI for the first five games of the season, but with the team drawing one and losing four of these, Shoji was dropped to the bench. He did not make the starting line-up in a league game for the remainder of the season and only played 644 minutes in his 21 league appearances.

=== Machida Zelvia ===
On 25 December 2023, Gen Shoji announcement permanently transfer to Machida Zelvia for upcoming 2024 season.

== International career ==
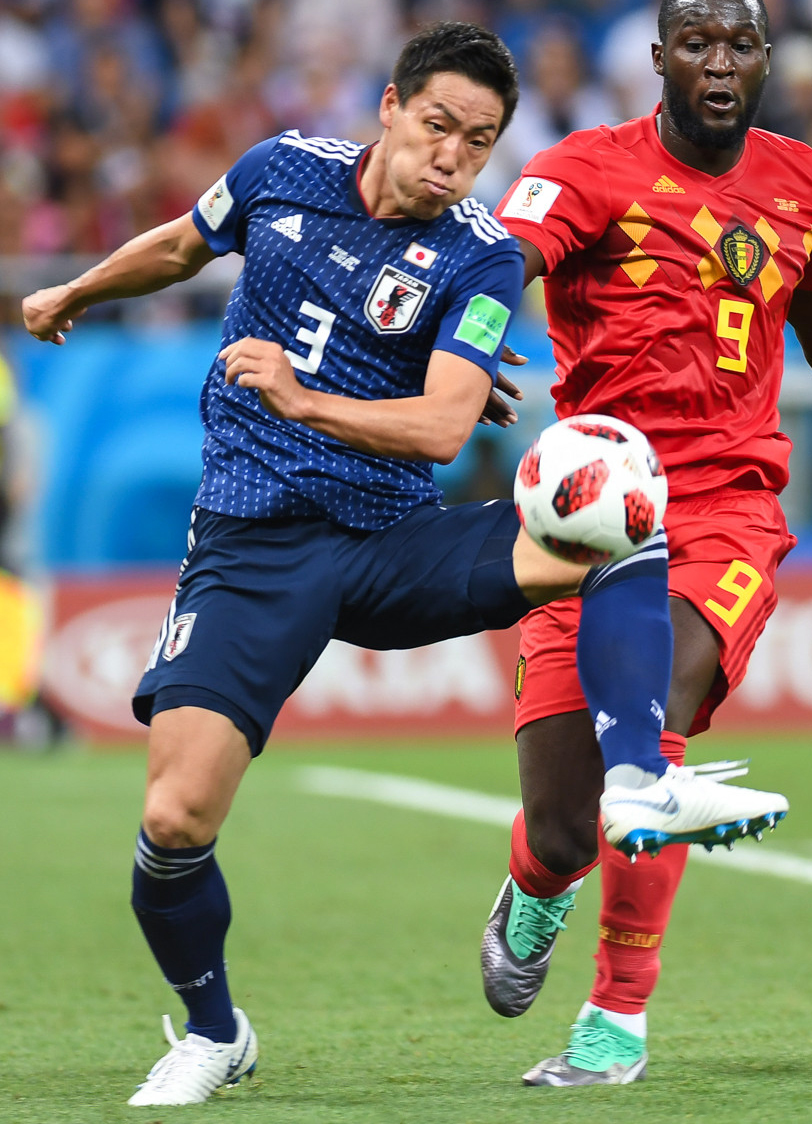
Shoji trying to defend the ball from Romelu Lukaku during a round of 16 match in the World Cup against Belgium on 2 July 2018.

It was announced on 1 October 2014 that Shoji was called up for the Japan's squad for the first time by Manager Javier Aguirre. However, he withdrew from the squad, due to an injury. Two months later, it was announced that Shoji was called up for the national team ahead of the AFC Asian Cup in Australia. However, he appeared as an unused substitute throughout the tournament.

On 31 March 2015 Shoji made his Japan debut against Uzbekistan in a friendly match, starting the whole game, as he helped the side beat Uzbekistan 5–1. A year later on 3 June 2016, Shoji made another appearance for Japan, coming on as the 84th-minute substitute, in a 7–2 win against Bulgaria. In December 2017, he was called up to the national team squad for the EAFF E-1 Football Championship as a host. Shoji captained Japan for the first time in his career and led the side to beat North Korea 1–0. In a follow–up match against China, he scored his first Japan goal, which turns out to be a winning goal, in a 2–1 win. However, Japan lost 4–1 to South Korea in a deciding match, which resulted in the opposition team becoming champions in the tournament. After the match, Shoji reflected on the loss, saying: "Today, Korea was amazing. There were a lot of things we had to follow. Of course, duels and balls, but it was quick to make blocks. It was ambiguous about today. I think it was a sad game."

In May 2018, Shoji was named in Japan's preliminary squad for the 2018 FIFA World Cup in Russia. Eventually, he made it to the final cut of the 23 men squad. Shoji made his World Cup debut against Colombia in Matchday 1 of the group stage, where he played the whole game, in a 2-1 win. Shoji later made two more starts in the tournament, as they were eliminated by Belgium in the knockout stage. Shortly after, Fox Sports named Shoji in the Asian's Best Eleven of the tournament.

Following the tournament, Shoji didn't receive a call up from the national team until March 2019 for a match against Colombia, which he played against and the side lost 1–0 on 22 March 2019. Three months later in June, Shoji started two more matches back to back for the national side, including being a captain against El Salvador on 9 June 2019 and helping them keep two clean sheets.

== Personal life ==
When Shoji was two years old, Great Hanshin earthquake struck in his hometown. He said about the thoughts, saying: "I listened to my father and mother and did some research on my own. You must never forget. I want to do my best on behalf of Kobe as long as I carry the country, regardless of whether I go to the match or not." His father works as the chief of the technical committee chairman of the Hyogo Football Association. Shoji has an older sister, Kaede, who is an actress.

In January 2017, Shoji announced his marriage to a general woman, which took place in the previous October. Outside of football, he said he watches movies, stating it has helped him relive stress.

== Career statistics ==
=== Club ===
As of the 25 December 2023

Appearances and goals by club, season and competition
Club	Season	League			National cup		League cup		Continental		Other (Note: Includes Suruga Bank Championship, FIFA World Cup)		Total	
Club	Season	Division	Apps	Goals	Apps	Goals	Apps	Goals	Apps	Goals	Apps	Goals	Apps	Goals
Kashima Antlers	2011	J. League Division 1	0	0	2	0	0	0	0	0	–		2	0
Kashima Antlers	2012	J. League Division 1	9	0	4	1	5	0	–		–		18	1
Kashima Antlers	2013	J. League Division 1	4	0	0	0	1	0	–		0	0	5	0
Kashima Antlers	2014	J. League Division 1	34	2	0	0	6	0	–		0	0	40	2
Kashima Antlers	2015	J1 League	29	3	0	0	4	0	5	0	0	0	38	3
Kashima Antlers	2016	J1 League	34	1	4	0	2	1	–		5	0	45	2
Kashima Antlers	2017	J1 League	34	1	2	1	1	0	8	0	1	0	46	2
Kashima Antlers	2018	J1 League	16	1	2	0	1	0	9	0	2	0	30	1
Kashima Antlers	Total		160	8	14	2	20	1	22	0	8	0	224	11
Toulouse	2018–19	Ligue 1	18	0	2	0	0	0	–		–		20	0
Toulouse	2019–20	Ligue 1	1	0	0	0	0	0	–		–		1	0
Toulouse	Total		19	0	2	0	0	0	0	0	0	0	21	0
Gamba Osaka	2020	J1 League	18	0	0	0	1	0	–		–		19	0
Gamba Osaka	2021	J1 League	28	0	0	0	1	0	5	0	0	0	34	0
Gamba Osaka	2022	J1 League	25	0	2	0	1	0	–		–		28	0
Gamba Osaka	Total		71	0	2	0	3	0	5	0	0	0	81	0
Kashima Antlers	2023	J1 League	21	0	2	0	4	0	–		–		27	0
Kashima Antlers	Total		21	0	2	0	4	0	0	0	0	0	27	0
Machida Zelvia	2024	J1 League	0	0	0	0	0	0	–		–		0	0
Machida Zelvia	Total		0	0	0	0	0	0	0	0	0	0	0	0
Career total			271	8	20	2	27	1	27	0	8	0	353	11

=== International ===
As of 15 June 2021

Appearances and goals by national team and year
National team	Year	Apps	Goals
Japan	2015	1	0
Japan	2016	1	0
Japan	2017	8	1
Japan	2018	5	0
Japan	2019	3	0
Japan	2021	2	0
Total		20	1

Scores and results list Japan's goal tally first, score column indicates score after each Shoji goal.

List of international goals scored by Gen Shoji
No.	Date	Venue	Opponent	Score	Result	Competition
1	12 December 2017	Ajinomoto Stadium, Tokyo, Japan	China	2–0	2–1	2017 EAFF E-1 Football Championship

== Honours ==
Kashima Antlers

- J. League Division 1: 2016
- AFC Champions League: 2018

Machida Zelvia

- Emperor's Cup: 2025

Individual

- J. League Best Eleven: 2016, 2017
