= Yukitoshi Ito =

Japanese footballer (born 1993)

Yukitoshi Ito 伊東 幸敏
Personal information
- Full name: Yukitoshi Ito
- Date of birth: 3 September 1993 (age 33)
- Place of birth: Fuji, Shizuoka, Japan
- Height: 1.75 m (5 ft 9 in)
- Position: Defender

Youth career
- 2009–2011: Shizuoka Gakuen School

Senior career*
Years	Team	Apps	(Gls)
2012–2020	Kashima Antlers	74	(0)
2014–2015	→ J. League U-22 (loan)	4	(0)
2021	JEF United Chiba	6	(0)
2022	Oita Trinita	15	(0)
Total		101	(0)
Medal record
Kashima Antlers
Winner	AFC Champions League	2018
Winner	J1 League	2016
Runner-up	J1 League	2017
Winner	J.League Cup	2012
Winner	J.League Cup	2015
Winner	Emperor's Cup	2016
- * Club domestic league appearances and goals

Yukitoshi Ito (伊東 幸敏, Itō Yukitoshi; born 3 September 1993) is a Japanese former professional footballer who played as a defender.

== Career statistics ==
Appearances and goals by club, season and competition
Club	Season	League			National cup (Note: Includes Emperors Cup)		League cup (Note: Includes J.League Cup)		Continental		Other		Total	
Club	Season	Division	Apps	Goals	Apps	Goals	Apps	Goals	Apps	Goals	Apps	Goals	Apps	Goals
Kashima Antlers	2012	J.League Division 1	0	0	0	0	0	0	0	0	0	0	0	0
Kashima Antlers	2013	J.League Division 1	6	0	2	1	0	0	0	0	0	0	8	1
Kashima Antlers	2014	J.League Division 1	12	0	0	0	4	0	0	0	0	0	16	0
Kashima Antlers	2015	J1 League	8	0	1	0	0	0	0	0	0	0	9	0
Kashima Antlers	2016	J1 League	13	0	5	0	3	0	0	0	3 (Note: Appearance in J.League Championship)	0	24	0
Kashima Antlers	2017	J1 League	24	0	4	0	2	0	4 (Note: Appearances in AFC Champions League Elite)	0	0	0	34	0
Kashima Antlers	2018	J1 League	11	0	1	0	0	0	4	0	0	0	16	0
Kashima Antlers	2019	J1 League	2	0	3	0	1	0	0	0	0	0	6	0
Kashima Antlers	2020	J1 League	0	0	0	0	1	0	0	0	0	0	1	0
Kashima Antlers	Total		76	0	16	1	11	0	8	0	3	0	114	1
J.League U-22 Selection (loan)	2014	J3 League	2	0	–		–		–		–		2	0
J.League U-22 Selection (loan)	2015	J3 League	2	0	–		–		–		–		2	0
J.League U-22 Selection (loan)	Total		4	0	0	0	0	0	0	0	0	0	4	0
JEF United Chiba	2021	J2 League	6	0	1	0	–		–		–		7	0
Oita Trinita	2022	J2 League	15	0	2	0	2	0	–		–		19	0
Career total			101	0	19	1	13	0	8	0	3	0	144	1

== Honours ==
Kashima Antlers

- J1 League (1): 2016
- Emperor's Cup (1): 2016
- J. League Cup (2): 2012, 2015
- Suruga Bank Championship (2): 2012, 2013
- Japanese Super Cup (1): 2017
- AFC Champions League (1): 2018
