= Japan national football team results (2010–2019) =

This article lists the results for the Japan national football team between 2010 and 2019.

* Japan score always listed first

Win Draw Loss

== 2010 ==
Date	Opponent	Result	Score*	Venue	Competition
6 January 2010	Yemen	W	3–2	Ali Muhesen Stadium, Sana'a, Yemen	2011 AFC Asian Cup qualification
2 February 2010	Venezuela	D	0–0	Kyushu Oil Dome, Ōita, Japan	International Friendly (Kirin Challenge Cup 2010)
6 February 2010	China	D	0–0	Ajinomoto Stadium, Tokyo, Japan	2010 East Asian Football Championship
11 February 2010	Hong Kong	W	3–0	National Olympic Stadium, Tokyo, Japan	2010 East Asian Football Championship
14 February 2010	South Korea	L	1–3	National Olympic Stadium, Tokyo, Japan	2010 East Asian Football Championship
3 March 2010	Bahrain	W	2–0	Toyota Stadium, Toyota, Japan	2011 AFC Asian Cup qualification
7 April 2010	Serbia	L	0–3	Nagai Stadium, Osaka, Japan	International Friendly (Kirin Challenge Cup 2010)
24 May 2010	South Korea	L	0–2	Saitama Stadium 2002, Saitama, Japan	International Friendly (Kirin Challenge Cup 2010)
30 May 2010	England	L	1–2	UPC-Arena, Graz, Austria	International Friendly
4 June 2010	Ivory Coast	L	0–2	Stade Tourbillon, Sion, Switzerland	International Friendly
14 June 2010	Cameroon	W	1–0	Free State Stadium, Bloemfontein, South Africa	2010 FIFA World Cup
19 June 2010	Netherlands	L	0–1	Moses Mabhida Stadium, Durban, South Africa	2010 FIFA World Cup
24 June 2010	Denmark	W	3–1	Free State Stadium, Rustenburg, South Africa	2010 FIFA World Cup
29 June 2010	Paraguay	D	0–0 (a.e.t.); 3–5 (pen.)	Free State Stadium, Pretoria, South Africa	2010 FIFA World Cup
4 September 2010	Paraguay	W	1–0	International Stadium Yokohama, Japan	International Friendly (Kirin Challenge Cup 2010)
7 September 2010	Guatemala	W	2–1	Nagai Stadium, Osaka, Japan	International Friendly (Kirin Challenge Cup 2010)
8 October 2010	Argentina	W	1–0	Saitama Stadium 2002, Saitama, Japan	International Friendly (Kirin Challenge Cup 2010)
12 October 2010	South Korea	D	0–0	Seoul World Cup Stadium, Seoul, South Korea	International Friendly

== 2011 ==
Date	Opponent	Result	Score*	Venue	Competition
9 January 2011	Jordan	D	1–1	Qatar SC Stadium, Doha, Qatar	2011 AFC Asian Cup
13 January 2011	Syria	W	2–1	Qatar SC Stadium, Doha, Qatar	2011 AFC Asian Cup
17 January 2011	Saudi Arabia	W	5–0	Ahmed bin Ali Stadium, Al Rayyan, Qatar	2011 AFC Asian Cup
21 January 2011	Qatar	W	3–2	Al-Gharafa Stadium, Doha, Qatar	2011 AFC Asian Cup
25 January 2011	South Korea	D	2–2 (a.e.t.); 3–0 (pen.)	Al-Gharafa Stadium, Doha, Qatar	2011 AFC Asian Cup
29 January 2011	Australia	W	1–0 (a.e.t.)	Khalifa International Stadium, Doha, Qatar	2011 AFC Asian Cup
1 June 2011	Peru	D	0–0	Niigata Stadium, Niigata, Japan	International Friendly (Kirin Challenge Cup 2011)
7 June 2011	Czech Republic	D	0–0	International Stadium Yokohama, Kanagawa, Japan	International Friendly (Kirin Challenge Cup 2011)
10 August 2011	South Korea	W	3–0	Sapporo Dome, Hokkaidō, Japan	International Friendly (Kirin Challenge Cup 2011)
2 September 2011	North Korea	W	1–0	Saitama Stadium 2002, Saitama, Japan	2014 FIFA World Cup qualification (AFC) Third Round
6 September 2011	Uzbekistan	D	1–1	Pakhtakor Markaziy Stadium, Tashkent, Uzbekistan	2014 FIFA World Cup qualification (AFC) Third Round
7 October 2011	Vietnam	W	1–0	Home's Stadium Kobe, Hyōgo, Japan	International Friendly (Kirin Challenge Cup 2011)
11 October 2011	Tajikistan	W	8–0	Nagai Stadium, Osaka, Japan	2014 FIFA World Cup qualification (AFC) Third Round
11 November 2011	Tajikistan	W	4–0	Central Stadium, Dushanbe, Tajikistan	2014 FIFA World Cup qualification (AFC) Third Round
15 November 2011	North Korea	L	0–1	Kim Il-sung Stadium, Pyongyang, North Korea	2014 FIFA World Cup qualification (AFC) Third Round

== 2012 ==
Date	Opponent	Result	Score*	Venue	Competition
24 February 2012	Iceland	W	3–1	Nagai Stadium, Osaka, Japan	International Friendly (Kirin Challenge Cup 2012)
29 February 2012	Uzbekistan	L	0–1	Toyota Stadium, Aichi, Japan	2014 FIFA World Cup qualification (AFC) Third Round
23 May 2012	Azerbaijan	W	2–0	Shizuoka Stadium, Shizuoka, Japan	International Friendly (Kirin Challenge Cup 2012)
3 June 2012	Oman	W	3–0	Saitama Stadium 2002, Saitama, Japan	2014 FIFA World Cup qualification (AFC) Fourth Round
8 June 2012	Jordan	W	6–0	Saitama Stadium 2002, Saitama, Japan	2014 FIFA World Cup qualification (AFC) Fourth Round
12 June 2012	Australia	D	1–1	Lang Park, Brisbane, Australia	2014 FIFA World Cup qualification (AFC) Fourth Round
15 August 2012	Venezuela	D	1–1	Sapporo Dome, Hokkaidō, Japan	International Friendly (Kirin Challenge Cup 2012)
6 September 2012	United Arab Emirates	W	1–0	Tohoku Denryoku Big Swan Stadium, Niigata, Japan	International Friendly (Kirin Challenge Cup 2012)
11 September 2012	Iraq	W	1–0	Saitama Stadium 2002, Saitama, Japan	2014 FIFA World Cup qualification (AFC) Fourth Round
12 October 2012	France	W	1–0	Stade de France, Saint-Denis, France	International Friendly
16 October 2012	Brazil	L	0–4	Stadion Miejski, Wrocław, Poland	International Friendly
14 November 2012	Oman	W	2–1	Sultan Qaboos Sports Complex, Muscat, Oman	2014 FIFA World Cup qualification (AFC) Fourth Round

== 2013 ==
Date	Opponent	Result	Score*	Venue	Competition
6 February 2013	Latvia	W	3–0	Home's Stadium Kobe, Hyōgo, Japan	International Friendly (Kirin Challenge Cup 2013)
22 March 2013	Canada	W	2–1	Khalifa International Stadium, Doha, Qatar	International Friendly
26 March 2013	Jordan	L	1–2	King Abdullah Stadium, Amman, Jordan	2014 FIFA World Cup qualification (AFC) Fourth Round
30 May 2013	Bulgaria	L	0–2	Toyota Stadium, Toyota, Aichi, Japan	International Friendly (Kirin Challenge Cup 2013)
4 June 2013	Australia	D	1–1	Saitama Stadium 2002, Saitama, Japan	2014 FIFA World Cup qualification (AFC) Fourth Round
11 June 2013	Iraq	W	1–0	Grand Hamad Stadium, Doha, Qatar	2014 FIFA World Cup qualification (AFC) Fourth Round
15 June 2013	Brazil	L	0–3	Estádio Nacional de Brasília, Brasília, Brazil	2013 FIFA Confederations Cup
19 June 2013	Italy	L	3–4	Arena Cidade da Copa, Recife, Brazil	2013 FIFA Confederations Cup
22 June 2013	Mexico	L	1–2	Mineirão, Belo Horizonte, Brazil	2013 FIFA Confederations Cup
21 July 2013	China	D	3–3	Seoul World Cup Stadium, Seoul, South Korea	2013 EAFF East Asian Cup
25 July 2013	Australia	W	3–2	Hwaseong Stadium, Hwaseong, South Korea	2013 EAFF East Asian Cup
28 July 2013	South Korea	W	2–1	Jamsil Olympic Stadium, Seoul, South Korea	2013 EAFF East Asian Cup
14 August 2013	Uruguay	L	2–4	Miyagi Stadium, Rifu, Miyagi, Japan	International Friendly (Kirin Challenge Cup 2013)
6 September 2013	Guatemala	W	3–0	Nagai Stadium, Osaka, Japan	International Friendly (Kirin Challenge Cup 2013)
10 September 2013	Ghana	W	3–1	International Stadium Yokohama, Kanagawa, Japan	International Friendly (Kirin Challenge Cup 2013)
11 October 2013	Serbia	L	0–2	Karađorđe Stadium, Novi Sad, Serbia	International Friendly
15 October 2013	Belarus	L	0–1	Torpedo Stadium, Zhodino, Belarus	International Friendly
16 November 2013	Netherlands	D	2–2	Cristal Arena, Genk, Belgium	International Friendly
19 November 2013	Belgium	W	3–2	King Baudouin Stadium, Brussels, Belgium	International Friendly

== 2014 ==
Date	Opponent	Result	Score*	Venue	Competition
5 March 2014	New Zealand	W	4–2	National Olympic Stadium, Tokyo, Japan	International Friendly (Kirin Challenge Cup 2014)
27 May 2014	Cyprus	W	1–0	Saitama Stadium 2002, Saitama, Japan	International Friendly (Kirin Challenge Cup 2014)
2 June 2014	Costa Rica	W	3–1	Raymond James Stadium, Tampa, Florida, United States	International Friendly
6 June 2014	Zambia	W	4–3	Raymond James Stadium, Tampa, Florida, United States	International Friendly
14 June 2014	Ivory Coast	L	1–2	Arena Pernambuco, Recife, Brazil	2014 FIFA World Cup
19 June 2014	Greece	D	0–0	Arena das Dunas, Natal, Brazil	2014 FIFA World Cup
24 June 2014	Colombia	L	1–4	Arena Pantanal, Cuiabá, Brazil	2014 FIFA World Cup
5 September 2014	Uruguay	L	0–2	Sapporo Dome, Sapporo, Hokkaido, Japan	International Friendly (Kirin Challenge Cup 2014)
9 September 2014	Venezuela	D	2–2	International Stadium Yokohama, Yokohama, Kanagawa, Japan	International Friendly (Kirin Challenge Cup 2014)
10 October 2014	Jamaica	W	1–0	Denka Big Swan Stadium, Niigata, Japan	International Friendly (Kirin Challenge Cup 2014)
14 October 2014	Brazil	L	0–4	Singapore National Stadium, Singapore	International Friendly
14 November 2014	Honduras	W	6–0	Toyota Stadium, Toyota, Aichi, Japan	International Friendly (Kirin Challenge Cup 2014)
18 November 2014	Australia	W	2–1	Nagai Stadium, Osaka, Japan	International Friendly (Kirin Challenge Cup 2014)

== 2015 ==
Date	Opponent	Result	Score*	Venue	Competition
12 January 2015	Palestine	W	4–0	Newcastle Stadium, Newcastle, Australia	2015 AFC Asian Cup
16 January 2015	Iraq	W	1–0	Brisbane Stadium, Brisbane, Australia	2015 AFC Asian Cup
20 January 2015	Jordan	W	2–0	Melbourne Rectangular Stadium, Melbourne, Australia	2015 AFC Asian Cup
23 January 2015	United Arab Emirates	D	1–1; 4–5 (pen.)	Stadium Australia, Sydney, Australia	2015 AFC Asian Cup
27 March 2015	Tunisia	W	2–0	Ōita Bank Dome, Ōita, Japan	International Friendly (Kirin Challenge Cup 2015)
31 March 2015	Uzbekistan	W	5–1	Ajinomoto Stadium, Tokyo, Japan	International Friendly (JAL Challenge Cup 2015)
11 June 2015	Iraq	W	4–0	International Stadium Yokohama Yokohama, Japan	International Friendly (Kirin Challenge Cup 2015)
16 June 2015	Singapore	D	0–0	Saitama Stadium 2002, Saitama, Japan	2018 FIFA World Cup (AFC) and 2019 Asian Cup qualification
2 August 2015	North Korea	L	1–2	Wuhan Sports Center Stadium, Wuhan, China	2015 EAFF East Asian Cup
5 August 2015	South Korea	D	1–1	Wuhan Sports Center Stadium, Wuhan, China	2015 EAFF East Asian Cup
9 August 2015	China	D	1–1	Wuhan Sports Center Stadium, Wuhan, China	2015 EAFF East Asian Cup
3 September 2015	Cambodia	W	3–0	Saitama Stadium 2002, Saitama, Japan	2018 FIFA World Cup (AFC) and 2019 Asian Cup qualification
8 September 2015	Afghanistan	W	6–0	Azadi Stadium, Tehran, Iran	2018 FIFA World Cup (AFC) and 2019 Asian Cup qualification
8 October 2015	Syria	W	3–0	Seeb Stadium, Seeb, Oman	2018 FIFA World Cup (AFC) and 2019 Asian Cup qualification
13 October 2015	Iran	D	1–1	Azadi Stadium, Tehran, Iran	International Friendly
12 November 2015	Singapore	W	3–0	National Stadium, Singapore, Singapore	2018 FIFA World Cup (AFC) and 2019 Asian Cup qualification
17 November 2015	Cambodia	W	2–0	Olympic Stadium, Phnom Penh, Cambodia	2018 FIFA World Cup (AFC) and 2019 Asian Cup qualification

== 2016 ==
Date	Opponent	Result	Score*	Venue	Competition
24 March 2016	Afghanistan	W	5–0	Saitama Stadium 2002, Saitama, Japan	2018 FIFA World Cup (AFC) and 2019 Asian Cup qualification
29 March 2016	Syria	W	5–0	Saitama Stadium 2002, Saitama, Japan	2018 FIFA World Cup (AFC) and 2019 Asian Cup qualification
3 June 2016	Bulgaria	W	7–2	Toyota Stadium, Toyota, Japan	International Friendly (Kirin Cup Soccer 2016)
7 June 2016	Bosnia and Herzegovina	L	1–2	Suita City Football Stadium, Suita, Japan	International Friendly (Kirin Cup Soccer 2016)
1 September 2016	United Arab Emirates	L	1–2	Saitama Stadium 2002, Saitama, Japan	2018 FIFA World Cup qualification (AFC) Round 3
6 September 2016	Thailand	W	2–0	Rajamangala Stadium, Bangkok, Thailand	2018 FIFA World Cup qualification (AFC) Round 3
6 October 2016	Iraq	W	2–1	Saitama Stadium 2002, Saitama, Japan	2018 FIFA World Cup qualification (AFC) Round 3
11 October 2016	Australia	D	1–1	Docklands Stadium, Melbourne, Australia	2018 FIFA World Cup qualification (AFC) Round 3
11 November 2016	Oman	W	4–0	Kashima Soccer Stadium, Kashima, Japan	International Friendly (Kirin Challenge Cup 2016)
15 November 2016	Saudi Arabia	W	2–1	Saitama Stadium 2002, Saitama, Japan	2018 FIFA World Cup qualification (AFC) Round 3

== 2017 ==
Date	Opponent	Result	Score*	Venue	Competition
23 March 2017	United Arab Emirates	W	2–0	(United Arab Emirates) Mohammed Bin Zayed Stadium, Abu Dhabi, UAE	2018 FIFA World Cup qualification (AFC) Round 3
28 March 2017	Thailand	W	4–0	Saitama Stadium 2002, Saitama, Japan	2018 FIFA World Cup qualification (AFC) Round 3
7 June 2017	Syria	D	1–1	Tokyo Stadium, Chōfu, Japan	International Friendly (Kirin Challenge Cup 2017)
13 June 2017	Iraq	D	1–1	Shahid Dastgerdi Stadium, Tehran, Iran	2018 FIFA World Cup qualification (AFC) Round 3
31 August 2017	Australia	W	2–0	Saitama Stadium 2002, Saitama, Japan	2018 FIFA World Cup qualification (AFC) Round 3
5 September 2017	Saudi Arabia	L	0–1	King Abdullah Sports City, Jeddah, Saudi Arabia	2018 FIFA World Cup qualification (AFC) Round 3
6 October 2017	New Zealand	W	2–1	Toyota Stadium, Toyota, Japan	International Friendly (Kirin Challenge Cup 2017)
10 October 2017	Haiti	D	3–3	International Stadium Yokohama, Yokohama, Japan	International Friendly (Kirin Challenge Cup 2017)
10 November 2017	Brazil	L	1–3	Stade Pierre-Mauroy, Villeneuve d'Ascq, France	International Friendly
14 November 2017	Belgium	L	0–1	Jan Breydel Stadium, Bruges, Belgium	International Friendly
9 December 2017	North Korea	W	1–0	(Japan) Ajinomoto Stadium, Tokyo	2017 EAFF E-1 Football Championship
12 December 2017	China	W	2–1	(Japan) Ajinomoto Stadium, Tokyo	2017 EAFF E-1 Football Championship
16 December 2017	South Korea	L	1–4	(Japan) Ajinomoto Stadium, Tokyo	2017 EAFF E-1 Football Championship

== 2018 ==
Date	Opponent	Result	Score*	Venue	Competition
23 March 2018	Mali	D	1–1	Stade Maurice Dufrasne, Liège, Belgium	International Friendly
27 March 2018	Ukraine	L	1–2	Stade Maurice Dufrasne, Liège, Belgium	International Friendly (Kirin Challenge Cup 2018)
30 May 2018	Ghana	L	0–2	International Stadium Yokohama, Yokohama, Japan	International Friendly (Kirin Challenge Cup 2018)
8 June 2018	Switzerland	L	0–2	Cornaredo Stadium, Lugano, Switzerland	International Friendly
12 June 2018	Paraguay	W	4–2	Tivoli-Neu, Innsbruck, Austria	International Friendly
19 June 2018	Colombia	W	2–1	Mordovia Arena, Saransk, Russia	2018 FIFA World Cup Group H
24 June 2018	Senegal	D	2–2	Central Stadium, Yekaterinburg, Russia	2018 FIFA World Cup Group H
28 June 2018	Poland	L	0–1	Volgograd Arena, Volgograd, Russia	2018 FIFA World Cup Group H
2 July 2018	Belgium	L	2–3	Rostov Arena, Rostov-on-Don, Russia	2018 FIFA World Cup Round of 16
11 September 2018	Costa Rica	W	3–0	Panasonic Stadium Suita, Suita, Japan	International Friendly (Kirin Challenge Cup 2018)
12 October 2018	Panama	W	3–0	Denka Big Swan Stadium, Niigata, Japan	International Friendly (Kirin Challenge Cup 2018)
16 October 2018	Uruguay	W	4–3	Saitama Stadium 2002, Saitama, Japan	International Friendly (Kirin Challenge Cup 2018)
16 November 2018	Venezuela	D	1–1	Ōita Bank Dome, Ōita, Japan	International Friendly (Kirin Challenge Cup 2018)
20 November 2018	Kyrgyzstan	W	4–0	Toyota Stadium, Toyota, Japan	International Friendly (Kirin Challenge Cup 2018)

== 2019 ==
Date	Opponent	Result	Score*	Venue	Competition
9 January 2019	Turkmenistan	W	3–2	Al Nahyan Stadium, Abu Dhabi, United Arab Emirates	2019 AFC Asian Cup
13 January 2019	Oman	W	1–0	Zayed Sports City Stadium, Abu Dhabi, United Arab Emirates	2019 AFC Asian Cup
17 January 2019	Uzbekistan	W	2–1	Khalifa bin Zayed Stadium, Al Ain, United Arab Emirates	2019 AFC Asian Cup
21 January 2019	Saudi Arabia	W	1–0	Sharjah Stadium, Sharjah, United Arab Emirates	2019 AFC Asian Cup
24 January 2019	Vietnam	W	1–0	Al Maktoum Stadium, Dubai, United Arab Emirates	2019 AFC Asian Cup
28 January 2019	Iran	W	3–0	Hazza bin Zayed Stadium, Al Ain, United Arab Emirates	2019 AFC Asian Cup
1 February 2019	Qatar	L	1–3	Zayed Sports City Stadium, Abu Dhabi, United Arab Emirates	2019 AFC Asian Cup
22 March 2019	Colombia	L	0–1	International Stadium Yokohama, Yokohama, Japan	International Friendly (Kirin Challenge Cup 2019)
26 March 2019	Bolivia	W	1–0	Noevir Stadium Kobe, Kobe, Japan	International Friendly (Kirin Challenge Cup 2019)
5 June 2019	Trinidad and Tobago	D	0–0	Toyota Stadium, Toyota, Japan	International Friendly (Kirin Challenge Cup 2019)
9 June 2019	El Salvador	W	2–0	Hitomebore Stadium Miyagi, Rifu, Japan	International Friendly (Kirin Challenge Cup 2019)
17 June 2019	Chile	L	0–4	Estádio do Morumbi, São Paulo, Brazil	2019 Copa América
20 June 2019	Uruguay	D	2–2	Arena do Grêmio, Porto Alegre, Brazil	2019 Copa América
24 June 2019	Ecuador	D	1–1	Estádio Mineirão, Belo Horizonte, Brazil	2019 Copa América
5 September 2019	Paraguay	W	2–0	Kashima Soccer Stadium, Kashima, Japan	International Friendly (Kirin Challenge Cup 2019)
10 September 2019	Myanmar	W	2–0	Thuwunna Stadium, Yangon, Myanmar	2022 FIFA World Cup qualification (AFC) Second Round
10 October 2019	Mongolia	W	6–0	Saitama Stadium 2002, Saitama, Japan	2022 FIFA World Cup qualification (AFC) Second Round
15 October 2019	Tajikistan	W	3–0	Pamir Stadium, Dushanbe, Tajikistan	2022 FIFA World Cup qualification (AFC) Second Round
14 November 2019	Kyrgyzstan	W	2–0	Dolen Omurzakov Stadium, Bishkek, Kyrgyzstan	2022 FIFA World Cup qualification (AFC) Second Round
19 November 2019	Venezuela	L	1–4	Panasonic Stadium Suita, Suita, Japan	International Friendly (Kirin Challenge Cup 2019)
10 December 2019	China	W	2–1	Busan Gudeok Stadium, Busan, South Korea	2019 EAFF E-1 Football Championship
14 December 2019	Hong Kong	W	5–0	Busan Gudeok Stadium, Busan, South Korea	2019 EAFF E-1 Football Championship
18 December 2019	South Korea	L	0–1	Busan Asiad Main Stadium, Busan, South Korea	2019 EAFF E-1 Football Championship

== Head-to-head records ==
Japan national football team head-to-head records (2010–2019)
Opponent	Pld	W	D	L	GF	GA	GD	Pts	Confederation
Afghanistan	2	2	0	0	11	0	+11	6	AFC
Argentina	1	1	0	0	1	0	+1	3	CONMEBOL
Australia	7	4	3	0	11	6	+5	15	AFC
Azerbaijan	1	1	0	0	2	0	+2	3	UEFA
Bahrain	1	1	0	0	2	0	+2	3	AFC
Belarus	1	0	0	1	0	1	–1	0	UEFA
Belgium	3	1	0	2	5	6	–1	3	UEFA
Bolivia	1	1	0	0	1	0	+1	3	CONMEBOL
Bosnia and Herzegovina	1	0	0	1	1	2	–1	0	UEFA
Brazil	4	0	0	4	1	14	–13	0	CONMEBOL
Bulgaria	2	1	0	1	7	4	+3	3	UEFA
Cambodia	2	2	0	0	5	0	+5	6	AFC
Cameroon	1	1	0	0	1	0	+1	3	CAF
Canada	1	1	0	0	2	1	+1	3	CONCACAF
Chile	1	0	0	1	0	4	–4	0	CONMEBOL
China	5	2	3	0	8	6	+2	9	AFC
Colombia	3	1	0	2	3	6	–3	3	CONMEBOL
Costa Rica	2	2	0	0	6	1	+5	6	CONCACAF
Cyprus	1	1	0	0	1	0	+1	3	UEFA
Czech Republic	1	0	1	0	0	0	0	1	UEFA
Denmark	1	1	0	0	3	1	+2	3	UEFA
Ecuador	1	0	1	0	1	1	0	1	CONMEBOL
El Salvador	1	1	0	0	2	0	+2	3	CONCACAF
England	1	0	0	1	1	2	–1	0	UEFA
France	1	1	0	0	1	0	+1	3	UEFA
Ghana	2	1	0	1	3	3	0	3	CAF
Greece	1	0	1	0	0	0	0	1	UEFA
Guatemala	2	2	0	0	5	1	+4	6	CONCACAF
Haiti	1	0	1	0	3	3	0	1	CONCACAF
Honduras	1	1	0	0	6	0	+6	3	CONCACAF
Hong Kong	2	2	0	0	8	0	+8	6	AFC
Iceland	1	1	0	0	3	1	+2	3	UEFA
Iran	2	1	1	0	4	1	+3	4	AFC
Iraq	6	5	1	0	10	2	+8	16	AFC
Italy	1	0	0	1	3	4	–1	0	UEFA
Ivory Coast	2	0	0	2	1	4	–3	0	CAF
Jamaica	1	1	0	0	1	0	+1	3	CONCACAF
Jordan	4	2	1	1	10	3	+7	7	AFC
Kyrgyzstan	2	2	0	0	6	0	+6	6	AFC
Latvia	1	1	0	0	3	0	+3	3	UEFA
Mali	1	0	1	0	1	1	0	1	CAF
Mexico	1	0	0	1	1	2	–1	0	CONCACAF
Mongolia	1	1	0	0	6	0	+6	3	AFC
Myanmar	1	1	0	0	2	0	+2	3	AFC
Netherlands	2	0	1	1	2	3	–1	1	UEFA
New Zealand	2	2	0	0	6	3	+3	6	OFC
North Korea	4	2	0	2	3	3	0	6	AFC
Oman	4	4	0	0	10	1	+9	12	AFC
Palestine	1	1	0	0	4	0	+4	3	AFC
Panama	1	1	0	0	3	0	+3	3	CONCACAF
Paraguay	4	3	1	0	7	2	+5	10	CONMEBOL
Peru	1	0	1	0	0	0	0	1	CONMEBOL
Poland	1	0	0	1	0	1	–1	0	UEFA
Qatar	2	1	0	1	4	5	–1	3	AFC
Saudi Arabia	4	3	0	1	8	2	+6	9	AFC
Senegal	1	0	1	0	2	2	0	1	CAF
Serbia	2	0	0	2	0	5	–5	0	UEFA
Singapore	2	1	1	0	3	0	+3	4	AFC
South Korea	9	2	3	4	10	14	–4	9	AFC
Switzerland	1	0	0	1	0	2	–2	0	UEFA
Syria	4	3	1	0	11	2	+9	10	AFC
Tajikistan	3	3	0	0	15	0	+15	9	AFC
Thailand	3	3	0	0	8	1	+7	9	AFC
Trinidad and Tobago	1	0	1	0	0	0	0	1	CONCACAF
Tunisia	1	1	0	0	2	0	+2	3	CAF
Turkmenistan	1	1	0	0	3	2	+1	3	AFC
Ukraine	1	0	0	1	1	2	–1	0	UEFA
United Arab Emirates	4	2	1	1	5	3	+2	7	AFC
Uruguay	4	1	1	2	8	11	–3	4	CONMEBOL
Uzbekistan	4	2	1	1	8	4	+4	7	AFC
Venezuela	5	0	4	1	5	8	–3	4	CONMEBOL
Vietnam	2	2	0	0	2	0	+2	6	AFC
Yemen	1	1	0	0	3	2	+1	3	AFC
Zambia	1	1	0	0	4	3	+1	3	CAF
Total	154	89	30	35	292	137	+155	297	

== See also ==
- Japan at the Copa América
