= Akihiro Sato (footballer, born August 1986) =

Japanese footballer

Akihiro Sato 佐藤昭大
Personal information
- Full name: Akihiro Sato
- Date of birth: 30 August 1986 (age 40)
- Place of birth: Asahi, Mie, Japan
- Height: 1.82 m (6 ft 0 in)
- Position: Goalkeeper

Youth career
- 2002–2004: Sanfrecce Hiroshima

Senior career*
Years	Team	Apps	(Gls)
2005–2009	Sanfrecce Hiroshima	38	(0)
2007	→ Ehime FC (loan)	28	(0)
2010–2015	Kashima Antlers	10	(0)
2016–2018	Roasso Kumamoto	82	(1)
2019–2020	Montedio Yamagata	13	(0)
Medal record
Kashima Antlers
Winner	J.League Cup	2011
Winner	J.League Cup	2012
Winner	J.League Cup	2015
Winner	Emperor's Cup	2010
- * Club domestic league appearances and goals as of 5 January 2021

Akihiro Sato (佐藤 昭大, Satō Akihiro; born 30 August 1986 in Asahi, Mie) is a former Japanese footballer who last played for Montedio Yamagata in the J2 League.

== Club career ==
After four season with Kashima Antlers, he was released by the club in November 2015.

== Career statistics ==
Updated to end of 2018 season.

Club performance			League		Cup		League Cup		Continental		Total	
Season	Club	League	Apps	Goals	Apps	Goals	Apps	Goals	Apps	Goals	Apps	Goals
Japan			League		Emperor's Cup		League Cup		Asia		Total	
2005	Sanfrecce Hiroshima	J1 League	8	0	2	0	0	0	-		10	0
2006	Sanfrecce Hiroshima	J1 League	0	0	0	0	1	0	-		1	0
2007	Ehime F.C.	J2 League	28	0	0	0	-		-		28	0
2008	Sanfrecce Hiroshima	J2 League	24	0	4	0	-		-		28	0
2009	Sanfrecce Hiroshima	J1 League	6	0	2	0	1	0	-		9	0
2010	Kashima Antlers	J1 League	0	0	0	0	0	0	0	0	0	0
2011	Kashima Antlers	J1 League	0	0	0	0	0	0	0	0	0	0
2012	Kashima Antlers	J1 League	0	0	1	0	2	0	-		3	0
2013	Kashima Antlers	J1 League	0	0	0	0	2	0	-		2	0
2014	Kashima Antlers	J1 League	0	0	0	0	1	0	-		1	0
2015	Kashima Antlers	J1 League	10	0	2	0	0	0	0	0	12	0
2016	Roasso Kumamoto	J2 League	41	0	0	0	-		-		41	0
2017	Roasso Kumamoto	J2 League	10	1	0	0	-		-		10	1
2018	Roasso Kumamoto	J2 League	31	0	0	0	-		-		31	0
Career total			158	1	11	0	7	0	0	0	176	1
