= Daigo Nishi =

Japanese footballer (born 1987)

Daigo Nishi 西 大伍
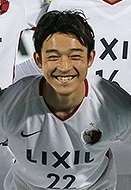
- Nishi with Kashima Antlers at the 2018 AFC Champions League Final

Personal information
- Full name: Daigo Nishi
- Date of birth: 28 August 1987 (age 39)
- Place of birth: Sapporo, Hokkaido, Japan
- Height: 1.76 m (5 ft 9 in)
- Position: Right back

Youth career
- –1999: Shinei SSS
- 2000–2005: Consadole Sapporo

Senior career*
Years	Team	Apps	(Gls)
2006–2010	Hokkaido Consadole Sapporo	73	(11)
2010	→ Albirex Niigata (loan)	29	(1)
2011–2018	Kashima Antlers	221	(10)
2019–2020	Vissel Kobe	55	(1)
2021	Urawa Red Diamonds	25	(1)
2022–2023	Hokkaido Consadole Sapporo	13	(0)
2023	→ Iwate Grulla Morioka (loan)	9	(0)
2024-2025	Iwate Grulla Morioka	46	(2)

International career^{‡}
2011–2019	Japan	2	(0)
- * Club domestic league appearances and goals as of 5 November 2022 ‡ National team caps and goals as of 26 March 2019

Daigo Nishi (西 大伍, Nishi Daigo; born 28 August 1987 in Sapporo, Hokkaido) is a Japanese professional footballer who plays as a right back for J3 League club Iwate Grulla Morioka.

== Club career ==
=== Youth period ===
He played as a regular member in U-15, U-18 Consadole Sapporo (currently J league Div.1). In U-15 team, he played as forward with Mike Havenaar, and in U-18 team played as offensive- and defensive-midfielder.

In 2004, he took part in the training with Portuguese club, CS Maritimo.

In 2005, the team participated in the All Japan youth championship and he contributed to the runners-up.

=== Hokkaido Consadole Sapporo ===
In 2006, he started his professional career in Hokkaido Consadole Sapporo with Seiya Fujita, but at the beginning, he had few chances to play in the matches. In 2007, he went to Brasil to join in the training in EC Viroria with Shunsuke Iwanuma. He went there on 30 September and the contract would continue until December, but due to many injured players in Consadole, he was brought back to Sapporo on 24 October. On 27 October, he played in J league match against Ehime FC from in the middle and scored the primary goal as a professional in the additional time, which resulted in the winning of the team. In 2008, he marked 3 goals in total, all of them were scored in the additional time, including the winning goal against Kashiwa Reysol on 30 March. He changed his position from right wing-half to right wing-back in 2009 and participated in 42 matches and scored 7 goals.

=== Albirex Niigata ===
He transferred to Albirex Niigata on loan in 2010. At the beginning, he was a substitute member for midfielder, but afterward played 29 matches regularly as a right-back and marked 1 goal.

=== Kashima Antlers ===
In 2011, he transferred to Kashima Antlers on a permanent deal and changed his position to defender.

His direct volley goal marked on 2 August against Sanfrecce Hiroshima was chosen for the best goal award 2014 of J league.

He was assigned to be a head of players association of the team for 2 years, from 2015 to 2016.

=== Returns to Hokkaido Consadole Sapporo ===
On 4 February 2022, it was announced that Nishi made his return to Hokkaido Consadole Sapporo, having previously played 25 times for Urawa Reds in 2021 season.

=== Iwate Grulla Morioka ===
On 17 August 2023, Nishi signed on loan with J3 League club, Iwate Grulla Morioka.

== International career ==
=== National team ===
On 6 December 2010, he was selected for back-up members of AFC Asian Cup 2011.

In KIRIN Cup against Peru on 1 June 2011, he played for the national team for the first time.

On 1 October 2014, he was elected for the national team by the head coach Javier Aguirre.

On 26 March 2019, Nishi played his first match since 2011 for Japan against Bolivia.

=== FIFA Club World Cup 2016 ===
He participated in FIFA Club World Cup 2016. He played the final against Real Madrid C.F. for full-time.

He is the first player in the world who was judged by VAR (Video Assistant Referee) in the semi-final against Atletico Nacional.

== Style of play ==
He is a leader in team defence, often coordinating the other defenders from the right wing. He is also known as good playmaker as his number of passes are often top in the team, building up games from the right wing. Because of his experience as a midfielder, his technical skills enable him to exchange passes in narrow spaces and provide key passes. By improving defensive skill, accurate crossing ability, physical strength and an ability to concentrate, he is an asset in both attack and defence.

== Personal life ==
When he was an elementary school student, he appeared on TV program "1×8 Ikoyo" as a kids master of lifting. His sister, Sakurako Nishi belonged to the cheerleading team of Consadole Sapporo.

== Career statistics ==
=== Club ===
Updated to 13 December 2020.

Appearances and goals by club, season and competition
Club	Season	League			Emperor's Cup		League Cup		Asia		Other^{1}		Total	
Club	Season	Division	Apps	Goals	Apps	Goals	Apps	Goals	Apps	Goals	Apps	Goals	Apps	Goals
Consadole Sapporo	2006	J2 League	0	0	0	0	–		–		–		0	0
Consadole Sapporo	2007	J2 League	5	1	0	0	–		–		–		5	1
Consadole Sapporo	2008	J1 League	27	3	1	0	6	0	–		–		34	3
Consadole Sapporo	2009	J2 League	41	7	1	0	–		–		–		42	7
Albirex Niigata	2010	J1 League	29	1	3	0	6	0	–		–		38	1
Kashima Antlers	2011	J1 League	30	1	1	0	0	0	3	0	–		34	1
Kashima Antlers	2012	J1 League	30	1	5	0	10	0	–		1	0	46	1
Kashima Antlers	2013	J1 League	29	0	1	0	8	0	–		1	0	39	0
Kashima Antlers	2014	J1 League	23	3	1	0	2	0	–		–		26	3
Kashima Antlers	2015	J1 League	30	0	1	0	5	0	6	0	–		42	0
Kashima Antlers	2016	J1 League	26	1	3	0	6	0	–		5	0	40	1
Kashima Antlers	2017	J1 League	30	1	2	1	1	0	6	0	1	0	40	1
Kashima Antlers	2018	J1 League	23	3	4	1	3	1	6	2	3	0	39	7
Vissel Kobe	2019	J1 League	29	0	4	0	3	0	-		-		36	0
Vissel Kobe	2020	J1 League	26	1	-		1	0	7	1	1	0	35	2
Career total			378	23	27	2	51	1	28	3	9	0	496	28

^{1}Includes Japanese Super Cup, J. League Championship, Suruga Bank Championship and FIFA Club World Cup.

=== International ===
Japan national team
Year	Apps	Goals
2011	1	0
2012	0	0
2013	0	0
2014	0	0
2015	0	0
2016	0	0
2017	0	0
2018	0	0
2019	1	0
Total	2	0

== Honours ==
Kashima Antlers

- J1 League: 2016
- J. League Cup: 2011, 2012, 2015
- Emperor's Cup: 2016
- Japanese Super Cup: 2017
- Suruga Bank Championship: 2012, 2013
- AFC Champions League: 2018

Vissel Kobe

- Emperor's Cup: 2019

Individual

- J.League Best XI: 2017, 2018
