= 2012 Fagiano Okayama season =

Fagiano Okayama
2012 season
- Manager: Masanaga Kageyama
- J.League Division 2: 8th
- Emperor's Cup: Third round
Home colours	Away colours

The 2012 Fagiano Okayama season saw Fagiano Okayama compete in J.League Division 2 for the fourth consecutive season. Fagiano Okayama also competed in the 2012 Emperor's Cup.

== Competitions ==
=== J. League ===
==== League table ====
Pos	Team	Pld	W	D	L	GF	GA	GD	Pts	Promotion or relegation
6	Oita Trinita (O, P)	42	21	8	13	59	40	+19	71	Qualification for promotion playoffs
7	Tokyo Verdy	42	20	6	16	65	46	+19	66	
8	Fagiano Okayama	42	17	14	11	41	34	+7	65	
9	Giravanz Kitakyushu	42	19	7	16	53	47	+6	64	
10	Montedio Yamagata	42	16	13	13	51	49	+2	61	

Updated to match(es) played on 11 November 2012. Source: J.League Division 2
Rules for classification: 1st points; 2nd goal differential; 3rd goals scored; 4th head-to-head results; 5th disciplinary points; 6th draw. If two clubs are tied for first place, both clubs will be declared champions.
(O) Play-off winners; (P) Promoted

==== Matches ====
4 March 2012 1	Fagiano Okayama	1–1	Kataller Toyama	Kanko Stadium
Sunday 15:04	Tiago 44'	Report	30' Seo	Attendance: 6,981; Referee: Oka

11 March 2012 2	Giravanz Kitakyushu	0–0	Fagiano Okayama	Honjo Stadium
Sunday 13:03		Report		Attendance: 4,009; Referee: Ogawa

17 March 2012 3	Fagiano Okayama	0–3	Mito HollyHock	Kanko Stadium
Saturday 18:33		Report	2', 33' Suzuki; 55' Hashimoto	Attendance: 5,576; Referee: Onishi

20 March 2012 4	Oita Trinita	1–0	Fagiano Okayama	Oita Bank Dome
Tuesday 13:05	Mitsuhira 88'	Report		Attendance: 7,113; Referee: Kubota

25 March 2012 5	Fagiano Okayama	2–1	Montedio Yamagata	Kanko Stadium
Sunday 13:03	Nakano 36'; Sengoku 61'	Report	64' Nakashima	Attendance: 5,762; Referee: Ogiya

1 April 2012 6	Tokushima Vortis	1–2	Fagiano Okayama	Pocarisweat Stadium
Sunday 16:00	Suzuki 21' (pen.) (yellow card) 76' (yellow-red card) 89'; Hamada (yellow card) 44' (yellow-red card) 85'; Hanai (yellow card) 58'; Kim Jong-Min (yellow card) 70'; Saito (yellow card) 90+2'	Report	Nakano (yellow card) 21'; Kawamata (yellow card) 54' (goal) 82'; Kondo (yellow card) 55'; Kim Min-Kyun 75' (yellow card) 76'	Attendance: 5,121; Referee: (Japan) Akhiko Ikeuchi

8 April 2012 7	Fagiano Okayama	1–0	Matsumoto Yamaga	Kanko Stadium
14:00	Kawamata 24' (yellow card) 26'	Report	Tetsuto (yellow card) 42'	Attendance: 7,877; Referee: (Japan) Nobutsugu Murakami

15 April 2012 8	JEF United Chiba	0–0	Fagiano Okayama	Fukuda Denshi Arena
Sunday 17:00	Ito (yellow card) 31'; Hyodo (yellow card) 81'	Report	Sawaguchi (yellow card) 77'	Attendance: 9,056; Referee: (Japan) Hajime Matsuo

22 April 2012 9	Fagiano Okayama	2–0	Gainare Tottori	Kanko Stadium
Sunday 17:00	Kawamata 39'; Ishihara (yellow card) 42'; Goto (yellow card) 62' (goal) 66'; Nakabayashi (yellow card) 86'	Report	Okuyama (yellow card) 28'; Fukui (yellow card) 50'	Attendance: 5,851; Referee: (Japan) Hiromichi Oka

27 April 2012 10	Roasso Kumamoto	0–0	Fagiano Okayama	Kumamoto Athletics Stadium
Friday 20:00	Saito (yellow card) 71'	Report	Ueda (yellow card) 37'	Attendance: 3,198; Referee: (Japan) Toshimitsu Yoshida

30 April 2012 11	Fagiano Okayama	2–1	Thespa Kusatsu	Kanko Stadium
Monday 17:00	Kim Min-Kyun 27'; Sekido 43'; Sengoku (yellow card) 59'; Chiaki (yellow card) 69'; Ichiyanagi (yellow card) 90+3'	Report	Sakurada (yellow card) 8'; Lincoln 30'; Nagata (yellow card) 87'	Attendance: 7,139; Referee: (Japan) Haruki Hidaka

3 May 2012 12	Yokohama F.C.	0–1	Fagiano Okayama	Nippatsu Mitsuzawa Stadium
Thursday 17:00	Sugiyama (yellow card) 62'	Report	Ishihara (yellow card) 52'; Kawamata 68'	Attendance: 2,803; Referee: (Japan) Shoichiro Mikami

6 May 2012 13	Fagiano Okayama	0–1	F.C. Gifu	Kanko Stadium
Sunday 17:00	Takeda (yellow card) 65'	Report	Kohei Nakajima (yellow card) 57'; Nogaito (yellow card) 68'; Hiroki Higuchi 86'	Attendance: 9,534; Referee: (Japan) Akihiko Ikeuchi

13 May 2012 14	Tokyo Verdy	0–1	Fagiano Okayama	Ajinomoto Stadium
Sunday 14:00	Tsuchiya (yellow card) 65'	Report	Sengoku (yellow card) 17'; Sekido 81'	Attendance: 3,515; Referee: (Japan) Kazuyoshi Enomoto

20 May 2012 15	Fagiano Okayama	1–2	Kyoto Sanga F.C.	Kanko Stadium
Sunday 17:00	Tadokoro 18'	Report	Sanou 31'; Kudo 69'	Attendance: 11,088; Referee: (Japan) Hiroyuki Onishi

27 May 2012 16	Avispa Fukuoka	1–1	Fagiano Okayama	Level-5 Stadium
Sunday 14:00	Takeda 32' (o.g.)	Report	Tadokoro 44'	Attendance: 4,090; Referee: (Japan) Naohito Ogawa

2 June 2012 17	Fagiano Okayama	1–1	Ehime F.C.	Kanko Stadium
Saturday	Ueda (yellow card) 41'; Sengoku (yellow card) 50'; Kawamata 70'	Report	Murakami 7'; Tomić (yellow card) 23' (yellow-red card) 90'; Uchida (yellow card) 74'	Attendance: 9,045; Referee: (Japan) Koei Koya

9 June 2012 18	Tochigi S.C.	0–1	Fagiano Okayama	Tochigi Green Stadium
Saturday 14:00	Paulinho (yellow card) 38'	Report	Ishihara 22' (yellow card) 72'; Kim Min-Kyun (yellow card) 44'; Chiaki (yellow card) 51'; Goto (yellow card) 57'; Kawamata (yellow card) 70'	Attendance: 1,901; Referee: (Japan) Tomohiro Tsukada

13 June 2012 19	Fagiano Okayama	2–1	Machida Zelvia	Kanko Stadium
Wednesday 20:00	Kawamata 39' (yellow card) 44'; Kim Min-Kyun 41'; Tadokoro (yellow card) 66'; Ishihara (yellow card) 85'	Report	Hiramoto 19'; Dimić (yellow card) 42'; Ota (yellow card) 49'	Attendance: 5,916; Referee: (Japan) Ryoichi Imamura

17 June 2012 20	Shonan Bellmare	2–0	Fagiano Okayama	Shonan BMW Stadium Hiratsuka
Sunday 19:30	Kaoru Takayama 17'; Nakamura 52'	Report		Attendance: 5,265; Referee: (Japan) Yuki Noda

24 June 2012 21	Fagiano Okayama	1–1	Ventforet Kofu	Kanko Stadium
Sunday 19:00	Goto (yellow card) 79'; Kawamata 87'	Report	Sasaki 79'	Attendance: 7,623; Referee: (Japan) Yudai Yamamoto

1 July 2012 22	Kyoto Sanga F.C.	1–1	Fagiano Okayama	Nishikyogoku Athletic Stadium
Sunday 20:00	Someya (yellow card) 67'; Nakamura 74'	Report	Kawamata 80' (yellow card) 90'	Attendance: 4,930; Referee: (Japan) Yuichi Nishimura

8 July 2012 23	Fagiano Okayama	0–1	Yokohama F.C.	Kanko Stadium
Sunday 19:00		Report	Sato (yellow card) 34'; Nozaki 62'; Abe (yellow card) 88'	Attendance: 12,618; Referee: (Japan) Toshimitsu Yoshida

15 July 2012 24	Fagiano Okayama	0–0	Tokushima Vortis	Kanko Stadium
Sunday 20:00		Report	Tiago (yellow card) 28'; Ueda (yellow card) 63'	Attendance: 9,457; Referee: (Japan) Masaaki Iemoto

22 July 2012 25	Matsumoto Yamaga	3–0	Fagiano Okayama	Matsumotodaira Football Stadium
Sunday 19:00	Ōhashi 45'; Funayama 66'; Kusunose (yellow card) 82'; Shiozawa 84'	Report	Takeda (yellow card) 41'	Attendance: 8,954; Referee: (Japan) Eiji Kawai

29 July 2012 26	Fagiano Okayama	0–1	JEF United Chiba	Kanko Stadium
Sunday 20:00	Sengoku (yellow card) 3'	Report	Hyodo 25'; Takeuchi (yellow card) 68'	Attendance: 7,970; Referee: (Japan) Kazuhiko Matsumura

5 August 2012 27	Fagiano Okayama	2–0	Roasso Kumamoto	Kanko Stadium
Sunday 20:00	Ueda 40' (yellow card) 89'; Hiroaki Kamijo (yellow card) 45+1'; Kim Min-Kyun 70'	Report	Fukuo (yellow card) 34'; Fujimoto (yellow card) 48'; Harada (yellow card) 75'	Attendance: 7,306; Referee: (Japan) Masuya Ueda

12 August 2012 28	Gainare Tottori	0–2	Fagiano Okayama	Tottori Bank Bird Stadium
Sunday 20:00	Ozaki (yellow card) 59'	Report	Kawamata 29'; Ueda (yellow card) 36'; Takeda 79'; Hiroaki Kamijo (yellow card) 90+2'	Attendance: 6,629; Referee: (Japan) Naohito Ogawa

19 August 2012 29	F.C. Gifu	1–2	Fagiano Okayama	Gifu Nagaragawa Stadium
Sunday 20:00	Ri Han-Jae (yellow card) 27'; Jinushizono 62'; Murakami (yellow card) 67'	Report	Kawamata 45+2', 71'; Tadokoro (yellow card) 60'; Goto (yellow card) 75'	Attendance: 2,434; Referee: (Japan) Kazuyoshi Enomoto

22 August 2012 30	Fagiano Okayama	1–1	Giravanz Kitakyushu	Kanko Stadium
Wednesday 20:00	Sengoku 42'; Ueda (yellow card) 57'	Report	Arai 19'; Oshima (yellow card) 40'; Satō (yellow card) 62'; Kimura (yellow card) 84'; Kim Jong-pil (yellow card) 90+2'	Attendance: 8,172; Referee: (Japan) Koei Koya

26 August 2012 31	Fagiano Okayama	0–0	Oita Trinita	Kanko Stadium
Sunday 20:00	Ueda (yellow card) 78'	Summary		Attendance: 9,237; Referee: (Japan) Yuichi Nishimura

2 September 2012 32	Machida Zelvia	2–2	Fagiano Okayama	Machida Athletic Stadium
Sunday 19:00	Ota 55'; Katsumata 61'; Fujita (yellow card) 69'	Summary	Kim Min-Kyun 19', 86'; Sekido (yellow card) 84'	Attendance: 2,170; Referee: (Japan) Koji Morikawa

14 September 2012 33	Ventforet Kofu	1–0	Fagiano Okayama	Yamanashi Chuo Bank Stadium
Friday 20:00	Davi 60' (yellow card) 82'; Aoki (yellow card) 90+2'	Summary		Attendance: 9,045; Referee: (Japan) Ryoichi Imamura

17 September 2012 34	Fagiano Okayama	3–1	Shonan Bellmare	Kanko Stadium
Monday 15:00	Goto (yellow card) 16'; Sengoku 34'; Tadokoro 41'; Kawamata 45+3'	Report	Kobayashi (yellow card) 31'; Furuhashi 62'; Endo (yellow card) 90'	Attendance: 7,155; Referee: (Japan) Minoru Tojo

23 September 2012 35	Ehime F.C.	1–0	Fagiano Okayama	Ningineer Stadium
Sunday 20:00	Watanabe (yellow card) 10'; Ishii 40'; Akai (yellow card) 90'	Summary		Attendance: 3,769; Referee: (Japan) Hiroyuki Onishi

30 September 2012 36	Kataller Toyama	1–1	Fagiano Okayama	Toyama Athletic Stadium
Sunday 19:00	Asuke 65'	Summary	Ishihara 61'; Ueda (yellow card) 73'	Attendance: 2,619; Referee: (Japan) Haruki Hidaka

6 October 2012 37	Fagiano Okayama	2–1	Avispa Fukuoka	Kanko Stadium
Saturday 15:00	Kawamata 3', 28'; Kim Min-Kyun (yellow card) 56'	Summary	Jogo 53'	Attendance: 3,946; Referee: (Japan) Masuya Ueda

14 October 2012 38	Fagiano Okayama	2–0	Tokyo Verdy	Kanko Stadium
Sunday 14:00	Kim Min-Kyun (yellow card) 3' (yellow-red card) 48'; Kawamata 17'; Tadokoro 90+3'	Summary	Alex (yellow card) 52'; Shoya Nakajima (yellow card) 69'; Kijima (yellow card) 72'; Shibasaki (yellow card) 85'	Attendance: 8,798; Referee: (Japan) Yosuke Kubota

21 October 2012 39	Thespa Kusatsu	1–0	Fagiano Okayama	Shoda Shoyu Stadium Gunma
Sunday 20:00	Alex Rafael 84'	Summary		Attendance: 1,887; Referee: (Japan) Koji Morikawa

28 October 2012 40	Mito HollyHock	0–0	Fagiano Okayama	K's denki Stadium Mito
Sunday 15:00	Frank (yellow card) 13'; Wako (yellow card) 45+2' (yellow-red card) 83'	Summary	Shinohara (yellow card) 24'; Chiaki (yellow card) 48'; Tadokoro (yellow card) 61'	Attendance: 3,034; Referee: (Japan) Kenta Tsukada

4 November 2012 41	Fagiano Okayama	2–1	Tochigi S.C.	Kanko Stadium
Sunday 13:00				Referee: (Japan)

11 November 2012 42	Montedio Yamagata	0–2	Fagiano Okayama	ND Soft Stadium Yamagata
Sunday 13:00				Referee: (Japan)

=== Emperor's Cup ===
9 September 2012 Round 2	Fagiano Okayama	2–0	Kataller Toyama	Okayama
13:00	Tiago 55'; Goto 77'	Report		Stadium: Kanko Stadium; Attendance: 3,277; Referee: Akihiko Ikeuchi

10 October 2012 Round 3	Fagiano Okayama	2–3	Nagoya Grampus	Toyama City
19:00	Sengoku 39'; Sekido 75'	Report	Tulio 46', 90+1' (pen.); Nagai 62'	Stadium: Toyama Athletic Stadium; Attendance: 2,102; Referee: Yoshiro Imamura
