= 2010 Fagiano Okayama season =

Fagiano Okayama
2010 season
- Manager: Masanaga Kageyama
- Stadium: Kanko Stadium
- J. League 2: 17th
- Emperor's Cup: 2nd Round
- Top goalscorer: Hiroki Kishida (5)
Home colours	Away colours

2010 Fagiano Okayama season

== Competitions ==
Competitions	Position
J. League 2	17th / 19 clubs
Emperor's Cup	2nd Round

== League table ==
Pos	Team	Pld	W	D	L	GF	GA	GD	Pts
15	Oita Trinita	36	10	11	15	39	49	−10	41
16	Mito HollyHock	36	8	14	14	29	45	−16	38
17	Fagiano Okayama	36	8	8	20	27	51	−24	32
18	Kataller Toyama	36	8	4	24	39	71	−32	28
19	Giravanz Kitakyushu	36	1	12	23	20	65	−45	15

Updated to match(es) played on December 4, 2010. Source: J.League Division 2
Rules for classification: 1) points; 2) goal difference; 3) number of goals scored.

== Player details ==
No.	Pos	Nat	Player	Total		2010 J. League Division 2		Emperor's Cup	
No.	Pos	Nat	Player	Apps	Goals	Apps	Goals	Apps	Goals
1	GK	(South Korea) KOR	Lee Chang-Gang	0	0	0	0	0	0
2	DF	(Japan) JPN	Masahiko Sawaguchi	27	2	27	2	0	0
3	DF	(Japan) JPN	Keita Goto	28	1	28	1	0	0
4	DF	(Japan) JPN	Tetsushi Kondo	33	0	33	0	0	0
5	DF	(Japan) JPN	Masahiko Kimura	0	0	0	0	0	0
6	DF	(Japan) JPN	Yasuhiro Nomoto	12	0	12	0	0	0
7	MF	(Japan) JPN	Ryusuke Senoo	9	1	9	1	0	0
8	MF	(South Korea) KOR	Kim Tae-Yeon	22	1	22	1	0	0
9	FW	(Japan) JPN	Hiroki Kishida	33	5	33	5	0	0
10	MF	(Japan) JPN	Shugo Kawahara	30	1	30	1	0	0
11	FW	(Japan) JPN	Kohei Kiyama	20	1	20	1	0	0
13	FW	(Japan) JPN	Seiko Yamanaka	9	0	9	0	0	0
14	MF	(Japan) JPN	Yusuke Kobayashi	27	1	27	1	0	0
15	FW	(Japan) JPN	Ryota Miki	15	3	15	3	0	0
16	MF	(Japan) JPN	Takahiro Kanemitsu	0	0	0	0	0	0
17	FW	(Japan) JPN	Shotaro Dei	1	0	1	0	0	0
18	DF	(Japan) JPN	Tadashi Takeda	2	0	2	0	0	0
19	DF	(Japan) JPN	Kohei Nishino	12	2	12	2	0	0
20	FW	(Japan) JPN	Hideaki Takeda	0	0	0	0	0	0
21	GW	(Japan) JPN	Hidenori Mago	34	0	34	0	0	0
22	MF	(Japan) JPN	Hitoshi Usui	12	1	12	1	0	0
23	DF	(Japan) JPN	Ryujiro Ueda	7	0	7	0	0	0
24	DF	(Japan) JPN	Kazuya Sakamoto	0	0	0	0	0	0
25	DF	(Japan) JPN	Ryo Tadokoro	30	1	30	1	0	0
26	MF	(Japan) JPN	Takaaki Fujisada	0	0	0	0	0	0
27	FW	(Japan) JPN	Tsuyoshi Shinchu	11	0	11	0	0	0
28	MF	(Japan) JPN	Yuhei Ono	0	0	0	0	0	0
29	GK	(Japan) JPN	Hironori Taki	0	0	0	0	0	0
30	DF	(Japan) JPN	Koji Noda	28	1	28	1	0	0
31	DF	(Japan) JPN	Takashi Nishihara	1	0	1	0	0	0
32	MF	(Japan) JPN	Yuji Makiura	0	0	0	0	0	0
33	MF	(Japan) JPN	Yuki Kotera	12	0	12	0	0	0
34	DF	(Japan) JPN	Yutaka Baba	2	0	2	0	0	0
35	MF	(Japan) JPN	Yuichi Morimoto	0	0	0	0	0	0
36	MF	(Japan) JPN	Ryohei Kamon	0	0	0	0	0	0
37	MF	(Japan) JPN	Takuya Yamamoto	0	0	0	0	0	0
37	FW	(Japan) JPN	Shingo Kukita	4	0	4	0	0	0
38	MF	(Japan) JPN	Takanori Chiaki	11	0	11	0	0	0
39	MF	(Japan) JPN	Naoyoshi Fukumoto	7	0	7	0	0	0
40	MF	(Japan) JPN	Naoki Miyata	3	0	3	0	0	0
41	MF	(Japan) JPN	Kazuma Shiina	0	0	0	0	0	0
42	MF	(Japan) JPN	Tsubasa Takeuchi	0	0	0	0	0	0
43	MF	(Japan) JPN	Takuro Yoshioka	0	0	0	0	0	0
44	MF	(Japan) JPN	Kojiro Shinohara	0	0	0	0	0	0
45	MF	(Japan) JPN	Kazuya Okazaki	0	0	0	0	0	0
46	MF	(Brazil) BRA	Fabio	0	0	0	0	0	0
47	MF	(Japan) JPN	Ryotaro Hironaga	5	0	5	0	0	0
48	MF	(Japan) JPN	Yuta Nakano	11	0	11	0	0	0
49	MF	(South Korea) KOR	Lee Dong-Myung	19	2	19	2	0	0
50	MF	(Japan) JPN	Kento Shiratani	18	4	18	4	0	0

== Other pages ==
- (in Japanese) J. League official site
