= 2006 Kashima Antlers season =

Kashima Antlers
2006 season
- Manager: Autuori
- Stadium: Kashima Soccer Stadium
- J. League 1: 6th
- Emperor's Cup: Semifinals
- J. League Cup: Runners-up
- Top goalscorer: Alex Mineiro (10)
Home colours	Away colours

2006 Kashima Antlers season

== Competitions ==
Competitions	Position
J. League 1	6th / 18 clubs
Emperor's Cup	Semifinals
J. League Cup	Runners-up

== Domestic results ==
=== J. League 1 ===
Match	Date	Venue	Opponents	Score
1	2006..			-
2	2006..			-
3	2006..			-
4	2006..			-
5	2006..			-
6	2006..			-
7	2006..			-
8	2006..			-
9	2006..			-
10	2006..			-
11	2006..			-
12	2006..			-
13	2006..			-
14	2006..			-
15	2006..			-
16	2006..			-
17	2006..			-
18	2006..			-
19	2006..			-
20	2006..			-
21	2006..			-
22	2006..			-
23	2006..			-
24	2006..			-
25	2006..			-
26	2006..			-
27	2006..			-
28	2006..			-
29	2006..			-
30	2006..			-
31	2006..			-
32	2006..			-
33	2006..			-
34	2006..			-

=== Emperor's Cup ===
Match	Date	Venue	Opponents	Score
4th Round	2006..			-
5th Round	2006..			-
Quarterfinals	2006..			-
Semifinals	2006..			-

=== J. League Cup ===
Match	Date	Venue	Opponents	Score
GL-B-1	2006..			-
GL-B-2	2006..			-
GL-B-3	2006..			-
GL-B-4	2006..			-
GL-B-5	2006..			-
GL-B-6	2006..			-
Quarterfinals-1	2006..			-
Quarterfinals-2	2006..			-
Semifinals-1	2006..			-
Semifinals-2	2006..			-
Final	2006..			-

== Player statistics ==
No.	Pos.	Player	D.o.B. (Age)	Height / Weight	J. League 1		Emperor's Cup		J. League Cup		Total	
No.	Pos.	Player	D.o.B. (Age)	Height / Weight	Apps	Goals	Apps	Goals	Apps	Goals	Apps	Goals
1	GK	Hideaki Ozawa	March 17, 1974 (aged 31)	cm / kg	12	0						
2	DF	Akira Narahashi	November 26, 1971 (aged 34)	cm / kg	3	0						
3	DF	Daiki Iwamasa	January 30, 1982 (aged 24)	cm / kg	30	3						
4	DF	Go Oiwa	June 23, 1972 (aged 33)	cm / kg	27	1						
6	MF	Yasuto Honda	June 25, 1969 (aged 36)	cm / kg	8	0						
7	DF	Toru Araiba	July 12, 1979 (aged 26)	cm / kg	30	2						
8	MF	Mitsuo Ogasawara	April 5, 1979 (aged 26)	cm / kg	20	3						
9	FW	Alex Mineiro	March 15, 1973 (aged 32)	cm / kg	31	10						
10	MF	Masashi Motoyama	June 20, 1979 (aged 26)	cm / kg	27	2						
11	FW	Masaki Fukai	September 13, 1980 (aged 25)	cm / kg	23	4						
13	FW	Atsushi Yanagisawa	May 27, 1977 (aged 28)	cm / kg	23	4						
14	DF	Kenji Haneda	December 1, 1981 (aged 24)	cm / kg	4	0						
16	MF	Fernando	June 18, 1978 (aged 27)	cm / kg	19	7						
17	DF	Jun Uchida	October 14, 1977 (aged 28)	cm / kg	0	0						
17	MF	Da Silva	September 21, 1986 (aged 19)	cm / kg	7	0						
18	DF	Tatsuya Ishikawa	December 25, 1979 (aged 26)	cm / kg	3	0						
18	DF	Fábio Santos	September 16, 1985 (aged 20)	cm / kg	20	3						
19	FW	Yūzō Tashiro	July 22, 1982 (aged 23)	cm / kg	20	7						
20	DF	Atsuto Uchida	March 27, 1988 (aged 17)	cm / kg	28	2						
21	GK	Hitoshi Sogahata	August 2, 1979 (aged 26)	cm / kg	22	0						
22	MF	Masaki Chugo	May 16, 1982 (aged 23)	cm / kg	17	0						
23	FW	Shinzo Koroki	July 31, 1986 (aged 19)	cm / kg	10	0						
24	MF	Takeshi Aoki	September 28, 1982 (aged 23)	cm / kg	31	2						
25	MF	Takuya Nozawa	August 12, 1981 (aged 24)	cm / kg	29	9						
26	MF	Chikashi Masuda	June 19, 1985 (aged 20)	cm / kg	23	0						
27	FW	Kohei Tanaka	December 11, 1985 (aged 20)	cm / kg	2	0						
28	GK	Shinichi Shuto	June 8, 1983 (aged 22)	cm / kg	0	0						
29	GK	Tetsu Sugiyama	June 26, 1981 (aged 24)	cm / kg	0	0						
30	MF	Hiroyuki Omichi	June 25, 1987 (aged 18)	cm / kg	0	0						
31	DF	Keita Goto	September 8, 1986 (aged 19)	cm / kg	0	0						
32	MF	Yuya Yoshizawa	April 20, 1986 (aged 19)	cm / kg	0	0						
33	MF	Takuya Yamamoto	June 22, 1986 (aged 19)	cm / kg	0	0						
34	FW	Ryuta Sasaki	February 7, 1988 (aged 18)	cm / kg	0	0						

== Other pages ==
- (in Japanese) J. League official site
