= 2007 Kashima Antlers season =

Kashima Antlers
2007 season
- Manager: Oliveira
- Stadium: Kashima Soccer Stadium
- J. League 1: 1st
- Emperor's Cup: Winners
- J. League Cup: Semi-final
- Top goalscorer: Marquinhos (14)
Home colours	Away colours

During the 2007 season, Kashima Antlers competed in the J. League 1, Emperor's Cup and J. League Cup, finishing the season as champions of the first two, whilst they were eliminated from the J. League Cup at the semi-final stage.

== Competitions ==
Competitions	Position
J. League 1	Champions / 18 clubs
Emperor's Cup	Champions
J. League Cup	Semifinals

=== J. League 1 ===
==== League table ====
Pos	Team	Pld	W	D	L	GF	GA	GD	Pts	Qualification or relegation
1	Kashima Antlers (C)	34	22	6	6	60	36	+24	72	2008 AFC Champions League Group Stage
2	Urawa Red Diamonds	34	20	10	4	55	28	+27	70	2008 AFC Champions League Knockout Stage
3	Gamba Osaka	34	19	10	5	71	37	+34	67	2008 AFC Champions League Group Stage (Note: Urawa Red Diamonds won the 2006 Emperor's Cup and have already qualified for AFC Champions League. Since Urawa takes the extra spot as the defending 2007 ACL champion; therefore Gamba Osaka received the third ACL spot as the third place team of the league.) (Note: Gamba Osaka qualifies to Pan-Pacific Championship as the Nabisco Cup winner.)
4	Shimizu S-Pulse	34	18	7	9	53	36	+17	61	
5	Kawasaki Frontale	34	14	12	8	66	48	+18	54	

Updated to match(es) played on December 1, 2007. Source: J. League Division 1
Rules for classification: 1) points; 2) goal difference; 3) number of goals scored.
(C) Champions

==== Results ====
J.League Division 1 results
Date	Opponent	Venue	Result F–A	Attendance
3 March 2007	Kawasaki Frontale	A	0–1	20,295
11 March 2007	Gamba Osaka	H	0–1	18,406
17 March 2007	JEF United Chiba	A	3–3	14,814
31 March 2007	Vissel Kobe	A	1–1	10,518
7 April 2007	Omiya Ardija	H	0–0	10,234
14 April 2007	Yokohama FC	A	1–0	19,367
21 April 2007	Shimizu S-Pulse	A	2–1	12,738
29 April 2007	Urawa Red Diamonds	H	0–1	36,146
3 May 2007	FC Tokyo	A	2–1	30,436
6 May 2007	Yokohama F. Marinos	H	1–1	13,344
12 May 2007	Júbilo Iwata	H	2–1	13,259
19 May 2007	Albirex Niigata	A	1–1	38,268
26 May 2007	Ventforet Kofu	H	2–0	10,081
9 June 2007	Oita Trinita	A	2–2	21,804
16 June 2007	Sanfrecce Hiroshima	H	5–1	10,524
20 June 2007	Kashiwa Reysol	A	1–0	10,273
24 June 2007	Nagoya Grampus Eight	H	2–1	14,317
30 June 2007	FC Tokyo	H	1–2	15,712
12 August 2007	Ventforet Kofu	A	1–0	14,316
15 August 2007	JEF United Chiba	H	3–1	19,600
19 August 2007	Omiya Ardija	A	2–1	13,889
25 August 2007	Yokohama FC	H	2–1	15,957
29 August 2007	Gamba Osaka	A	1–5	16,152
1 September 2007	Kawasaki Frontale	H	4–1	14,856
15 September 2007	Nagoya Grampus Eight	A	0–3	13,949
22 September 2007	Albirex Niigata	H	3–1	14,812
30 September 2007	Sanfrecce Hiroshima	A	1–0	13,492
6 October 2007	Vissel Kobe	H	3–2	10,503
20 October 2007	Júbilo Iwata	A	3–1	25,961
27 October 2007	Oita Trinita	H	3–0	8,036
10 November 2007	Yokohama F. Marinos	A	3–2	21,109
18 November 2007	Kashiwa Reysol	H	1–0	18,887
24 November 2007	Urawa Red Diamonds	A	1–0	62,123
1 December 2007	Shimizu S-Pulse	H	3–0	31,384

== Player statistics ==
No.	Pos.	Player	D.o.B. (Age)	Height / Weight	J. League 1		Emperor's Cup		J. League Cup		Total	
No.	Pos.	Player	D.o.B. (Age)	Height / Weight	Apps	Goals	Apps	Goals	Apps	Goals	Apps	Goals
1	GK	Hideaki Ozawa	17 March 1974 (aged 32)	cm / kg	3	0						
2	DF	Atsuto Uchida	27 March 1988 (aged 18)	cm / kg	31	0						
3	DF	Daiki Iwamasa	30 January 1982 (aged 25)	cm / kg	33	6						
4	DF	Go Oiwa	23 June 1972 (aged 34)	cm / kg	20	0						
5	DF	Fabão	15 June 1976 (aged 30)	cm / kg	12	2						
7	DF	Toru Araiba	12 July 1979 (aged 27)	cm / kg	30	1						
8	MF	Takuya Nozawa	12 August 1981 (aged 25)	cm / kg	29	5						
9	FW	Yūzō Tashiro	22 July 1982 (aged 24)	cm / kg	24	6						
10	MF	Masashi Motoyama	20 June 1979 (aged 27)	cm / kg	34	2						
11	MF	Danilo	11 June 1979 (aged 27)	cm / kg	26	0						
13	FW	Atsushi Yanagisawa	27 May 1977 (aged 29)	cm / kg	19	5						
14	MF	Chikashi Masuda	19 June 1985 (aged 21)	cm / kg	23	3						
15	MF	Takeshi Aoki	28 September 1982 (aged 24)	cm / kg	30	0						
16	MF	Masaki Chugo	16 May 1982 (aged 24)	cm / kg	28	4						
17	FW	Shinzo Koroki	31 July 1986 (aged 20)	cm / kg	22	6						
18	FW	Marquinhos	23 March 1976 (aged 30)	cm / kg	31	14						
21	GK	Hitoshi Sogahata	2 August 1979 (aged 27)	cm / kg	32	0						
22	DF	Naoya Ishigami	2 March 1985 (aged 22)	cm / kg	10	0						
23	MF	Yuji Funayama	19 January 1985 (aged 22)	cm / kg	8	1						
24	DF	Takefumi Toma	21 March 1989 (aged 17)	cm / kg	0	0						
25	MF	Yasushi Endo	7 April 1988 (aged 18)	cm / kg	2	0						
26	MF	Kenji Koyano	22 June 1988 (aged 18)	cm / kg	0	0						
27	FW	Kohei Tanaka	11 December 1985 (aged 21)	cm / kg	1	0						
28	GK	Shinichi Shuto	8 June 1983 (aged 23)	cm / kg	0	0						
29	GK	Tetsu Sugiyama	26 June 1981 (aged 25)	cm / kg	0	0						
30	MF	Hiroyuki Omichi	25 June 1987 (aged 19)	cm / kg	1	0						
31	DF	Keita Goto	8 September 1986 (aged 20)	cm / kg	0	0						
32	MF	Yuya Yoshizawa	20 April 1986 (aged 20)	cm / kg	2	0						
34	FW	Ryuta Sasaki	7 February 1988 (aged 19)	cm / kg	8	1						
40	MF	Mitsuo Ogasawara	5 April 1979 (aged 27)	cm / kg	14	4						

== Other pages ==
- (in Japanese) J. League official site
