= 2005 Kashima Antlers season =

Kashima Antlers
2005 season
- Manager: Toninho Cerezo
- Stadium: Kashima Soccer Stadium
- J. League 1: 3rd
- Emperor's Cup: Quarterfinals
- J. League Cup: GL-D 4th
- Top goalscorer: Alex Mineiro (15)
Home colours	Away colours

During the 2005 season, Kashima Antlers competed in the J. League 1, in which they finished 3rd.

== Competitions ==
Competitions	Position
J. League 1	3rd / 18 clubs
Emperor's Cup	Quarterfinals
J. League Cup	GL-D 4th / 4 clubs

== Domestic results ==
=== J. League 1 ===
Match	Date	Venue	Opponents	Score
1	2005..	[[]]	[[]]	-
2	2005..	[[]]	[[]]	-
3	2005..	[[]]	[[]]	-
4	2005..	[[]]	[[]]	-
5	2005..	[[]]	[[]]	-
6	2005..	[[]]	[[]]	-
7	2005..	[[]]	[[]]	-
8	2005..	[[]]	[[]]	-
9	2005..	[[]]	[[]]	-
10	2005..	[[]]	[[]]	-
11	2005..	[[]]	[[]]	-
12	2005..	[[]]	[[]]	-
13	2005..	[[]]	[[]]	-
14	2005..	[[]]	[[]]	-
15	2005..	[[]]	[[]]	-
16	2005..	[[]]	[[]]	-
17	2005..	[[]]	[[]]	-
18	2005..	[[]]	[[]]	-
19	2005..	[[]]	[[]]	-
20	2005..	[[]]	[[]]	-
21	2005..	[[]]	[[]]	-
22	2005..	[[]]	[[]]	-
23	2005..	[[]]	[[]]	-
24	2005..	[[]]	[[]]	-
25	2005..	[[]]	[[]]	-
26	2005..	[[]]	[[]]	-
27	2005..	[[]]	[[]]	-
28	2005..	[[]]	[[]]	-
29	2005..	[[]]	[[]]	-
30	2005..	[[]]	[[]]	-
31	2005..	[[]]	[[]]	-
32	2005..	[[]]	[[]]	-
33	2005..	[[]]	[[]]	-
34	2005..	[[]]	[[]]	-

=== Emperor's Cup ===
Match	Date	Venue	Opponents	Score
4th Round	2005..	[[]]	[[]]	-
5th Round	2005..	[[]]	[[]]	-
Quarterfinals	2005..	[[]]	[[]]	-

=== J. League Cup ===
Match	Date	Venue	Opponents	Score
GL-D-1	2005..	[[]]	[[]]	-
GL-D-2	2005..	[[]]	[[]]	-
GL-D-3	2005..	[[]]	[[]]	-
GL-D-4	2005..	[[]]	[[]]	-
GL-D-5	2005..	[[]]	[[]]	-
GL-D-6	2005..	[[]]	[[]]	-

== Player statistics ==
No.	Pos.	Player	D.o.B. (Age)	Height / Weight	J. League 1		Emperor's Cup		J. League Cup		Total	
No.	Pos.	Player	D.o.B. (Age)	Height / Weight	Apps	Goals	Apps	Goals	Apps	Goals	Apps	Goals
1	GK	Hideaki Ozawa	March 17, 1974 (aged 30)	cm / kg	0	0						
2	DF	Akira Narahashi	November 26, 1971 (aged 33)	cm / kg	11	0						
3	DF	Seiji Kaneko	May 27, 1980 (aged 24)	cm / kg	0	0						
4	DF	Go Oiwa	June 23, 1972 (aged 32)	cm / kg	30	0						
5	MF	Ari	November 19, 1980 (aged 24)	cm / kg	14	0						
5	MF	Ricardinho	June 24, 1976 (aged 28)	cm / kg	13	0						
6	MF	Yasuto Honda	June 25, 1969 (aged 35)	cm / kg	4	1						
7	DF	Toru Araiba	July 12, 1979 (aged 25)	cm / kg	28	1						
8	MF	Mitsuo Ogasawara	April 5, 1979 (aged 25)	cm / kg	30	11						
9	FW	Alex Mineiro	March 15, 1973 (aged 31)	cm / kg	27	15						
10	MF	Masashi Motoyama	June 20, 1979 (aged 25)	cm / kg	32	5						
11	FW	Masaki Fukai	September 13, 1980 (aged 24)	cm / kg	27	4						
14	DF	Kenji Haneda	December 1, 1981 (aged 23)	cm / kg	6	1						
15	DF	Daiki Iwamasa	January 30, 1982 (aged 23)	cm / kg	31	4						
16	MF	Fernando	June 18, 1978 (aged 26)	cm / kg	30	2						
17	DF	Jun Uchida	October 14, 1977 (aged 27)	cm / kg	17	0						
18	DF	Tatsuya Ishikawa	December 25, 1979 (aged 25)	cm / kg	10	0						
19	FW	Yūzō Tashiro	July 22, 1982 (aged 22)	cm / kg	5	1						
20	MF	Toshiyuki Abe	August 1, 1974 (aged 30)	cm / kg	8	0						
21	GK	Hitoshi Sogahata	August 2, 1979 (aged 25)	cm / kg	34	0						
22	MF	Masaki Chugo	May 16, 1982 (aged 22)	cm / kg	0	0						
23	FW	Shinzo Koroki	July 31, 1986 (aged 18)	cm / kg	8	0						
24	MF	Takeshi Aoki	September 28, 1982 (aged 22)	cm / kg	32	0						
25	MF	Takuya Nozawa	August 12, 1981 (aged 23)	cm / kg	28	10						
26	MF	Chikashi Masuda	June 19, 1985 (aged 19)	cm / kg	19	2						
27	FW	Yuki Nakashima	June 16, 1984 (aged 20)	cm / kg	2	0						
28	GK	Shinichi Shuto	June 8, 1983 (aged 21)	cm / kg	0	0						
29	GK	Tetsu Sugiyama	June 26, 1981 (aged 23)	cm / kg	0	0						
30	FW	Takayuki Suzuki	June 5, 1976 (aged 28)	cm / kg	25	3						
31	DF	Keita Goto	September 8, 1986 (aged 18)	cm / kg	0	0						
32	MF	Yuya Yoshizawa	April 20, 1986 (aged 18)	cm / kg	1	0						
33	MF	Takuya Yamamoto	June 22, 1986 (aged 18)	cm / kg	0	0						

== Other pages ==
- (in Japanese) J. League official site
