= Lee Chang-gang =

Zainichi Korean footballer (born 1984)

Lee Chang-Gang 이창강 李彰剛 リ・チャンガン
- Lee with Fagiano Okayama in 2011

Personal information
- Full name: Lee Chang-Gang (South Korea); Ri Changan (Japan)
- Date of birth: 9 December 1984 (age 41)
- Place of birth: Nagoya, Aichi, Japan
- Height: 1.87 m (6 ft 2 in)
- Position: Goalkeeper

Team information
- Current team: Fagiano Okayama
- Number: 1

Youth career
- –1996: Aichi Korean Second Elementary School
- 1997–2002: Aichi Korean Middle and High School
- 2003–2006: Hannan University

Senior career*
Years	Team	Apps	(Gls)
2007–2011	Fagiano Okayama	60	(0)
- * Club domestic league appearances and goals as of 6 October 2009

- Lee Chang-gang
- Hangul: 이창강
- Hanja: 李彰剛
- RR: I Changgang
- MR: I Ch'anggang

Lee Chang-Gang, also known in Japanese as Ri Changan (李 彰剛, Changan Ri; Korean: 이창강; Hanja: 李彰剛; born 9 December 1984) is a former professional footballer who played as a goalkeeper, who plays for Fagiano Okayama in J2 League. Born in Japan, he received his South Korean passport.

== Early life and college ==
A fourth-generation Zainichi, his father is a third-generation Zainichi and his mother is a second-generation. Although his native language is Japanese, he also speaks Korean fluently because he attended a Chōsen gakkō.

While attending Aichi Korean Second Elementary School, he was a member of the soccer club along with one cousin and two younger brothers. Although he was not very tall during his elementary school years, he began playing as a goalkeeper at the recommendation of his coach. Jong Tae-se was one of his teammates at the time, and they played together from elementary school through high school. Lee is the third J.League player in the school’s history. The first was Chong Yong-de (formerly of Yokohama FC, among others), and the second was Jong Tae-se.

Since Korean high schools do not grant the same graduation qualifications as Japanese high schools, he enrolled at Hannan University in Osaka Prefecture, which had a system in place to accept graduates of Korean schools, and joined the soccer club. He played alongside Masahiko Inoha, Ryang Yong-gi, and Yuki Fukaya. He became a regular starter in his third year of college and was selected for the Kansai Student All-Star team. He competed in the All Japan University Football Championship, but his team was eliminated in the group stage after losing to Komazawa University—which featured Yuki Maki and Shingo Akamine and went on to win the tournament.

== Club career ==
After graduating from college, he joined Fagiano Okayama, which was then in the Chūgoku Soccer League. In his first year with the club, he spent time as a reserve player on a team in the regional league but was part of the squad that earned promotion to the JFL. During his second season, after the team had joined the JFL, he became a regular starter and contributed to the team’s promotion to the J.League in their first year in the JFL.

Starting with the 2009 season, which marked his J.League debut, he changed his jersey number from 23 to 1 and took the field as the starting goalkeeper. He started in the season opener against Ventforet Kofu. He made several key saves, including one to block a shot by Kim Shin-young (the match ended in a 0-0 draw). He also made a series of excellent saves in the following match against Vegalta Sendai in the second round. Although he appeared in 39 matches, the team struggled in its first year of promotion and finished in last place.

On August 29, 2010, he fractured the little finger of his left hand during practice and was diagnosed with a two-month recovery period. As a result of Kazuma Shiina from the reserve team being registered to the first team, his player registration was removed.

In 2011, he appeared in the season opener against Shonan Bellmare, but the team lost 5-0, and his own performance was lackluster. On March 11, following the season opener, the Great East Japan Earthquake struck, causing the J.League to suspend play. During this hiatus, he fractured a toe on his right foot. He was unable to return before the league resumed, and even after fully recovering, he spent his days warming the bench as a substitute for Hidenori Mago. In September, he suffered another fracture and ended the season on that note. He left the club at the end of that year when his contract expired.

Since 2012, he has served as a development coach for Okayama.

== Club statistics ==
Club performance			League		Cup		Total	
Season	Club	League	Apps	Goals	Apps	Goals	Apps	Goals
Japan			League		Emperor's Cup		Total	
2007	Fagiano Okayama	Regional Leagues			-			
2008	Fagiano Okayama	Football League	21	0	2	0	23	0
2009	Fagiano Okayama	J2 League	39	0	1	0	40	0
2010	Fagiano Okayama	J2 League	0	0	0	0	0	0
2011	Fagiano Okayama	J2 League						
Country	Japan		60	0	3	0	63	0
Total			60	0	3	0	63	0
