= Yasuhiro Nomoto =

Japanese footballer

Yasuhiro Nomoto 野本 安啓
Personal information
- Full name: Yasuhiro Nomoto
- Date of birth: June 25, 1983 (age 43)
- Place of birth: Niigata, Japan
- Height: 1.82 m (5 ft 11 1/2 in)
- Position: Defender

Youth career
- 1999–2001: Niigata Technical High School

Senior career*
Years	Team	Apps	(Gls)
2002–2004	JEF United Ichihara	0	(0)
2005	Albirex Niigata Singapore	27	(1)
2006	Consadole Sapporo	0	(0)
2006	New Wave Kitakyushu		
2006–2011	Fagiano Okayama		
2011	V-Varen Nagasaki	8	(0)
2012	Blaublitz Akita	30	(1)
Total		65+	(2+)
- * Club domestic league appearances and goals

Yasuhiro Nomoto (野本 安啓, Nomoto Yasuhiro; born June 25, 1983) is a former Japanese football player.

== Playing career ==
Nomoto was born in Niigata on June 25, 1983. After graduating from high school, he joined J1 League club JEF United Ichihara in 2002. However he could not play at all in the match. In 2005, he moved to Albirex Niigata Singapore. In 2006, he returned to Japan and joined J2 League club Consadole Sapporo. However he could not play at all in the match. In July 2006, he moved to Regional Leagues club New Wave Kitakyushu. In October, he moved to Regional Leagues club Fagiano Okayama. He played many matches and Fagiano was promoted to Japan Football League (JFL) from 2008 and J2 from 2009. However his opportunity to play decreased from 2010. In July 2011, he moved to JFL club V-Varen Nagasaki. In 2012, he moved to JFL club Blaublitz Akita. He played many matches as regular player in 2012. He retired end of 2012 season.

== Club statistics ==
Club performance			League		Cup		League Cup		Total	
Season	Club	League	Apps	Goals	Apps	Goals	Apps	Goals	Apps	Goals
Japan			League		Emperor's Cup		J.League Cup		Total	
2002	JEF United Ichihara	J1 League	0	0	0	0	0	0	0	0
2003	JEF United Ichihara	J1 League	0	0	0	0	0	0	0	0
2004	JEF United Ichihara	J1 League	0	0	0	0	0	0	0	0
Singapore			League		Singapore Cup		League Cup		Total	
2005	Albirex Niigata Singapore	S. League	27	1	3	0	-		30	1
Japan			League		Emperor's Cup		J.League Cup		Total	
2006	Consadole Sapporo	J2 League	0	0	0	0	-		0	0
2006	New Wave Kitakyushu	Regional Leagues								
2006	Fagiano Okayama	Regional Leagues	0	0	-		-		0	0
2007	Fagiano Okayama	Regional Leagues								
2008	Fagiano Okayama	Football League	23	3	1	0	-		24	3
2009	Fagiano Okayama	J2 League	29	0	0	0	-		29	0
2010	Fagiano Okayama	J2 League	12	0	0	0	-		12	0
2011	Fagiano Okayama	J2 League	0	0	0	0	-		0	0
2011	V-Varen Nagasaki	Football League	8	0	1	0	-		9	0
2012	Blaublitz Akita	Football League	30	1	2	0	-		32	1
Total	Japan		102	4	4	0	0	0	106	4
Total	Singapore		27	1	3	0	-		30	1
Career total			129	5	7	0	0	0	136	5
