= Yūhei =

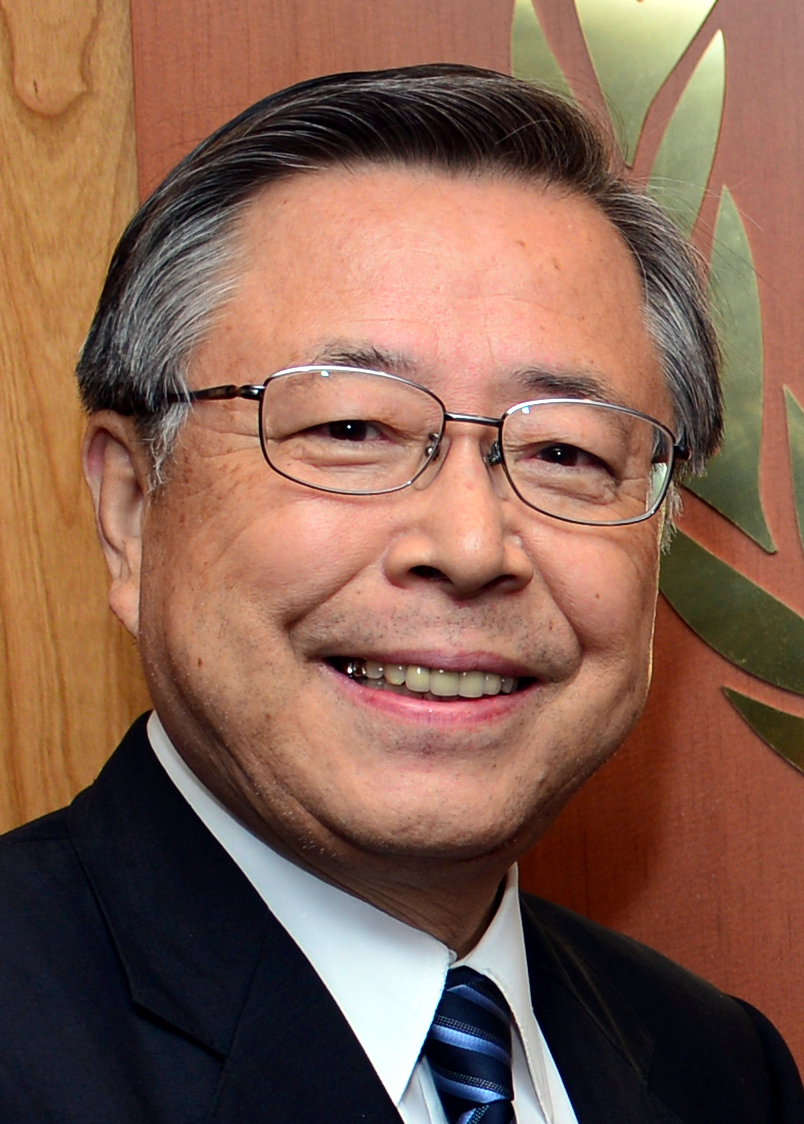
- Yuhei Sato, Japanese politician
- Pronunciation: jɯɯhei (IPA)
- Gender: Male

Origin
- Origin: Japanese
- Meaning: Different meanings depending on the kanji used

Other names
- Alternative spelling: Yuhei (Kunrei-shiki) Yuhei (Nihon-shiki) Yūhei, Yuhei, Yuuhei (Hepburn)

Yūhei, Yuhei or Yuuhei is a masculine Japanese given name.

== Written forms ==
Yūhei can be written using many different combinations of kanji characters. Here are some examples:

- 勇平, "courage, flat/peace"
- 勇兵, "courage, soldier"
- 悠平, "calm, flat/peace"
- 悠兵, "calm, soldier"
- 雄平, "male, flat/peace"
- 雄兵, "male, soldier"
- 優平, "gentleness, flat/peace"
- 優兵, "gentleness, soldier"
- 祐平, "help, flat/peace"
- 佑兵, "help, soldier"
- 裕平, "abundant, flat/peace"
- 有平, "have, flat/peace"
- 友平, "friend, flat/peace"

The name can also be written in hiragana ゆうへい or katakana ユウヘイ.

== Notable people with the name ==
- Yuhei Nakamura (中村 悠平; born 1987), Japanese baseball player
- Yuhei Nakaushiro (中後 悠平) (born 1989), Japanese former baseball player
- Yuhei Ono (小野 雄平) (born 1985), Japanese footballer
- Yuhei Sato (佐藤 雄平) (born 1947), Japanese politician
- Yuhei Sato (佐藤 優平, born 1990), Japanese footballer
- Yuhei Takai (高井 雄平; born 1984), Japanese baseball player
- Yūhei Tokunaga (徳永 悠平) (born 1983), Japanese footballer
