= 龍介 =

龍介 or 竜介, meaning "between dragon", is an Asian given name.

It may refer to:

- Hsieh Lung-chieh (謝龍介; born 1961), Kuomintang politician who elected current Tainan councillor in 2019, and he doubted William Lai's thesis
- Ryūsuke, Japanese masculine given name

== See also ==
- Long Jie (disambiguation)
