= Nakabayashi =

Nakabayashi (written: 中林) is a Japanese surname. Notable people with the surname include:

- Hirotsugu Nakabayashi (中林 洋次, born 1986), Japanese footballer
- Mei Nakabayashi (中林 芽依, born 1989), better known as May'n, Japanese singer

== Fictional characters ==
- Hiromi Nakabayashi (中林 宏美), a character in the light novel series Baka and Test
