= Tadokoro =

Tadokoro (written: 田所 lit. "rice-field place, farmland") is a Japanese surname. Notable people with the surname include:

- Azusa Tadokoro (田所 あずさ, born 1993), Japanese voice actress and singer
- Ryo Tadokoro (田所 諒, born 1986), Japanese footballer
- Yutaka Tadokoro (田所 豊, born 1962), better known as Diamond Yukai, Japanese singer and actor

== Fictional characters ==
- Jin Tadokoro (田所 迅), a character in the manga series Yowamushi Pedal
- Megumi Tadokoro (田所 恵), a character in the manga series Shokugeki no Sōma
