= Ryūjirō =

- Gender: Male

Origin
- Origin: Japanese
- Meaning: Different meanings depending on the kanji used

Ryūjirō, Ryujiro, Ryuujirou or Ryuujiroh (written: 龍仁朗 or 隆二郎) is a masculine Japanese given name. Notable people with the name include:

- Ryujiro Ueda (植田 龍仁朗; born 1988), Japanese footballer
