= Long Jie (disambiguation) =

Long Jie or Longjie may refer to:

- Long Jie, historical name of MV Sun Viking, one of the three original cruise ships ordered by Royal Caribbean Cruise Lines.
- Long Jie, contestant from Macau in Fencing at the 2014 Asian Games – Men's individual épée
- Longjie Miao and Yi ethnic township (龙街苗族彝族乡), ethnic township in Yiliang County, Zhaotong, Yunnan Province, China
- Longjie Subdistrict (龙街街道), subdistrict in Chengjiang, Yuxi, Yunnan Province, China
- Hsieh Lung-chieh (謝龍介; born 1961), Kuomintang politician who elected current Tainan councillor in 2019
- Qiu Long Jie (邱隆杰), Taiwanese actor who cast in Taiwanese television series Love Cuisine
- Wu Long Jie (吳隆傑), politician of Taiwan Solidarity Union in Kaohsiung County Constituency 4 of the 2008 Taiwanese legislative election
- Yu Long Jie (庾龍玠), character in Taiwanese television series The Arc of Life
- Zhao Long Jie (趙龍杰), character portrayed by Kent Tsai in Taiwanese web series 49 Days With a Merman (我家浴缸的二三事)
- Zhao Longjie (赵龙杰), athlete in China at the 2014 Asian Games

== See also ==
- 龍介 (disambiguation)
