= Kim Min-kyun =

South Korean footballer (born 1988)

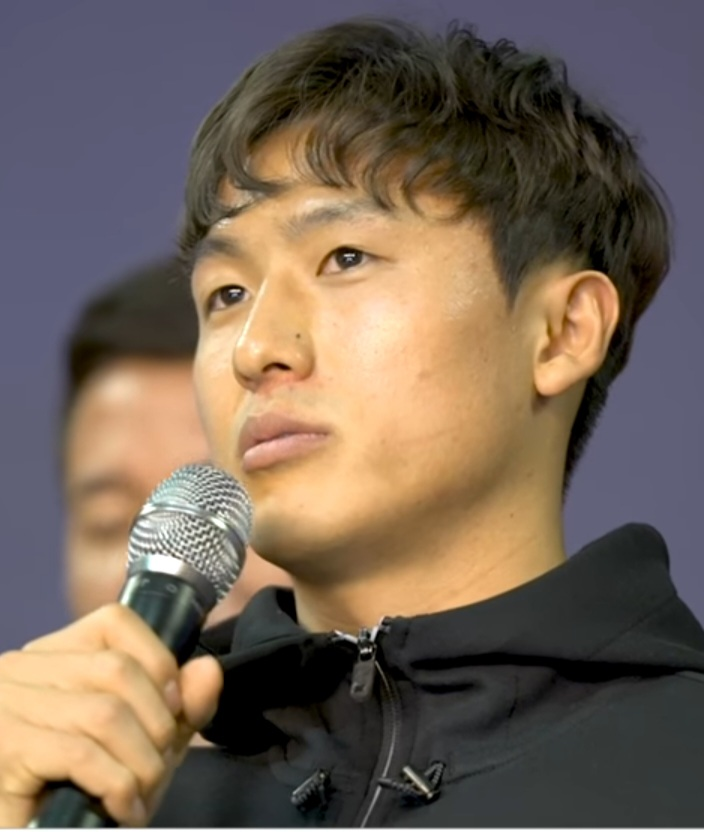

Personal information
- Date of birth: 30 November 1988 (age 37)
- Place of birth: Gimpo, South Korea
- Height: 1.73 m (5 ft 8 in)
- Position: Midfielder

Team information
- Current team: Daejeon Korail FC
- Number: 9

Youth career
- 2005–2008: Myongji University

Senior career*
Years	Team	Apps	(Gls)
2009–2010	Daegu FC	37	(1)
2011–2012	Fagiano Okayama	73	(10)
2013	Jagiellonia Białystok	5	(0)
2013	Fagiano Okayama	12	(2)
2014–2016	Ulsan Hyundai	14	(2)
2016	→ FC Anyang (loan)	38	(11)
2017–2018	FC Anyang	10	(4)
2017–2018	→ Asan Mugunghwa (loan)	25	(4)
2019–2021	Seoul E-Land	67	(10)
2022–	Daejeon Korail FC		

International career
2006–2007	South Korea U20	13	(1)
- * Club domestic league appearances and goals as of 5 March 2022

- Kim Min-kyun
- Hangul: 김민균
- Hanja: 金民均
- RR: Gim Mingyun
- MR: Kim Min'gyun

Kim Min-kyun (Korean: 김민균; born 30 November 1988) is a South Korean association footballer who plays as midfielder for Daejeon Korail FC.

== Club career ==
=== Daegu FC ===
Kim Min-kyun was drafted from Myongji University to Daegu FC in 2009. He made his Daegu FC first-team debut on 8 March 2009 in a match against Seongnam Ilhwa Chunma, and rapidly established himself as one of the first choice midfielders in the squad. Kim scored his first goal against Gangwon FC on 16 May 2009. During the 2010 season, Kim was used mainly as a substitute player, making eight out of his ten appearances in the K League from the bench. Kim left Daegu FC after reaching an agreement with the club for a mutual termination of his contract in March 2011.

=== Fagiano Okayama ===
On 20 April 2011, Kim joined Fagiano Okayama. During his time at Fagiano Okayama, he became an ever-present member of the starting eleven as an attacking midfielder. He played in 73 out of 79 league games during his time at Fagiano Okayama and featured in the starting eleven on 66 of those games. Kim scored his first league goal for Fagiano Okayama in a 2–1 loss against Consadole Sapporo on 29 May 2011.

=== Jagiellonia Białystok ===
On 28 January 2013, Kim joined Jagiellonia Białystok on a 2 1/2-year contract. He failed to secure himself as a first team regular during his time in Poland, featuring in five league games without playing the full 90 minutes in any of those games. Additionally, he also played four games in the Młoda Ekstraklasa, the under-21 league for youth players in the Ekstraklasa. On 15 July 2013 Kim left Jagiellonia Białystok after reaching an agreement with the club for a mutual termination of his contract.

=== Fagiano Okayama ===
On 31 July 2013, Kim returned to Fagiano Okayama. After a few substitute appearances, he once again became a starting regular in midfield, where he was present in the starting eleven in all eight league matches from 15 September 2013 to 10 November 2013. He scored his first goal since coming back in a 3–1 loss against Tochigi SC on 25 August 2013.

=== Ulsan Hyundai ===
On 10 January 2014, Kim joined Ulsan Hyundai on a three-year contract. He scored his first goal in a 2–2 draw against Suwon Samsung Bluewings on 19 April 2014.

== International career ==
Kim was a squad member of the South Korea U-20 team which participated at the 2006 AFC Youth Championship.

== Career statistics ==
As of 3 October 2017

Club performance			League		Cup		League Cup		Continental		Total	
Season	Club	League	Apps	Goals	Apps	Goals	Apps	Goals	Apps	Goals	Apps	Goals
South Korea			League		KFA Cup		League Cup		Asia		Total	
2009	Daegu FC	K League 1	27	1	3	0	4	0	—		34	1
2010	Daegu FC	K League 1	10	0	0	0	5	1	—		15	1
Japan			League		Emperor's Cup		League Cup		Asia		Total	
2011	Fagiano Okayama	J2 League	35	4	2	0	—		—		37	4
2012	Fagiano Okayama	J2 League	38	6	1	0	—		—		39	6
Poland			League		Polish Cup		Polish Super Cup		Europe		Total	
2013	Jagiellonia Białystok	Ekstraklasa	5	0	2	0	0	0	—		7	0
Japan			League		Emperor's Cup		League Cup		Asia		Total	
2013	Fagiano Okayama	J2 League	12	2	2	0	—		—		14	2
South Korea			League		KFA Cup		League Cup		Asia		Total	
2014	Ulsan Hyundai	K League 1	14	2	1	0	—		3	0	18	2
2015	Ulsan Hyundai	K League 1	0	0	0	0	—		0	0	0	0
2016	FC Anyang (loan)	K League 2	38	11	1	0	—		0	0	39	11
2017	FC Anyang	K League 2	10	4	1	0	—		0	0	11	4
2017	Asan Mugunghwa (loan)	K League 2	5	0	0	0	—		0	0	5	0
Career total			189	30	13	0	9	1	3	0	219	31
