= Ren Sengoku =

Japanese footballer

Ren Sengoku 仙石 廉
Personal information
- Full name: Ren Sengoku
- Date of birth: 2 October 1990 (age 36)
- Place of birth: Shiki, Saitama, Japan
- Height: 1.70 m (5 ft 7 in)
- Position: Midfielder

Youth career
- 2000–2008: Kashiwa Reysol Youth

Senior career*
Years	Team	Apps	(Gls)
2009–2010	Kashiwa Reysol	1	(0)
2011–2014	Fagiano Okayama	87	(3)
2015–2016	Nagano Parceiro	43	(1)
2017–2018	Tochigi SC	29	(0)
2018	Gainare Tottori	8	(0)
- * Club domestic league appearances and goals as of 2 January 2019

Ren Sengoku (仙石 廉, Sengoku Ren; born 2 October 1990) is a Japanese football player.

== Career statistics ==
Updated to 23 February 2018.

Appearances and goals by club, season and competition
Club	Season	League			Emperor's Cup		J.League Cup		Total	
Club	Season	Division	Apps	Goals	Apps	Goals	Apps	Goals	Apps	Goals
Kashiwa Reysol	2009	J1 League	0	0	0	0	0	0	0	0
Kashiwa Reysol	2010	J2 League	1	0	0	0	—		1	0
Fagiano Okayama	2011	J2 League	16	0	2	1	—		18	1
Fagiano Okayama	2012	J2 League	41	3	1	1	—		42	4
Fagiano Okayama	2013	J2 League	28	0	2	0	—		30	0
Fagiano Okayama	2014	J2 League	2	0	0	0	—		2	0
Nagano Parceiro	2015	J3 League	23	1	1	0	—		24	1
Nagano Parceiro	2016	J3 League	20	0	1	0	—		21	0
Tochigi SC	2017	J3 League	29	0	0	0	—		29	0
Career total			160	4	7	2	0	0	169	6
