= Ryūsuke =

- Gender: Male

Origin
- Origin: Japanese
- Meaning: Different meanings depending on the kanji used

Ryūsuke, Ryusuke or Ryuusuke (written: 隆介, 隆祐, 隆佑, 竜介 or 竜典) is a masculine Japanese given name. Notable people with the name include:

- Ryūsuke Hamaguchi (濱口 竜介; born 1978), Japanese film director and screenwriter
- Ryūsuke Hikawa (氷川 竜介; born 1958), Japanese anime critic and writer
- Ryusuke Minami (南 竜介; born 1981), Japanese baseball player
- Ryūsuke Mita (見田 竜介; born 1967), Japanese manga artist
- Ryusuke Numajiri (沼尻 竜典), Japanese conductor
- Ryūsuke Ōbayashi (大林 隆介; born 1946), Japanese voice actor
- Ryusuke Sakai (酒井 隆介; born 1988), Japanese footballer
- Ryusuke Senoo (妹尾 隆佑; born 1986), Japanese footballer
- Ryusuke Taguchi (田口 隆祐; born 1979), Japanese professional wrestler
