= Ricardinho (footballer, born June 1976) =

Brazilian footballer

Personal information
- Full name: Ricardo Alexandre dos Santos
- Date of birth: June 24, 1976 (age 50)
- Place of birth: Passos, Brazil
- Height: 1.70 m (5 ft 7 in)
- Position: Defensive midfielder

Youth career
- 1992–1994: Cruzeiro

Senior career*
Years	Team	Apps	(Gls)
1994–2001	Cruzeiro	133	(16)
2002–2006	Kashiwa Reysol	83	(13)
2005	→ Kashima Antlers (loan)	13	(0)
2007	Cruzeiro	24	(1)
2007	Corinthians	8	(0)

International career
1996–2001	Brazil	3	(0)
- * Club domestic league appearances and goals

Ricardo Alexandre dos Santos (born June 24, 1976, in Passos), or simply Ricardinho, is a former Brazilian footballer who played as defensive midfielder.

== Club statistics ==
Club performance			League		Cup		League Cup		Total	
Season	Club	League	Apps	Goals	Apps	Goals	Apps	Goals	Apps	Goals
Brazil			League		Copa do Brasil		League Cup		Total	
1994	Cruzeiro	Série A	2	0					2	0
1995	Cruzeiro	Série A	10	0					10	0
1996	Cruzeiro	Série A	20	1					20	1
1997	Cruzeiro	Série A	21	3					21	3
1998	Cruzeiro	Série A	20	1					20	1
1999	Cruzeiro	Série A	17	3					17	3
2000	Cruzeiro	Série A	21	5					21	5
2001	Cruzeiro	Série A	22	3					22	3
Japan			League		Emperor's Cup		J.League Cup		Total	
2002	Kashiwa Reysol	J1 League	11	1	1	0	1	0	13	1
2003	Kashiwa Reysol	J1 League	21	4	0	0	3	1	24	5
2004	Kashiwa Reysol	J1 League	11	0	0	0	2	0	13	0
2005	Kashiwa Reysol	J1 League	8	0	0	0	1	0	9	0
2005	Kashima Antlers	J1 League	13	0	0	0	0	0	13	0
2006	Kashiwa Reysol	J2 League	32	8	0	0	-		32	8
Brazil			League		Copa do Brasil		League Cup		Total	
2007	Cruzeiro	Série A	5	0					5	0
2007	Corinthians Paulista	Série A	8	0					8	0
Country	Brazil		146	16					146	16
Country	Japan		96	13	1	0	7	1	104	14
Total			242	29	1	0	7	1	250	30

== National team statistics ==
Brazil national team
Year	Apps	Goals
1996	1	0
1997	0	0
1998	0	0
1999	0	0
2000	1	0
2001	1	0
Total	3	0

== Honours ==
- Minas Gerais State League: 1994, 1996, 1997, 1998
- Brazilian Cup: 1996, 2000
- Libertadores Cup: 1997
- Brazilian Center-West Cup: 1999
- Recopa: 1999
- South Minas Cup: 2001, 2002
- Minas Gerais State Superleague: 2002

== Personal Honours ==
- Brazilian Bola de Prata (Placar): 2000

== Contract ==
- 5 July 2007 to 5 January 2009
