= 2011 Fagiano Okayama season =

Fagiano Okayama
2011 season
- Manager: Masanaga Kageyama
- Stadium: Kanko Stadium
- J2 League: 13th

2011 Fagiano Okayama season.

== League table ==
Pos	Team	Pld	W	D	L	GF	GA	GD	Pts
11	Roasso Kumamoto	38	13	12	13	33	44	−11	51
12	Oita Trinita	38	12	14	12	42	45	−3	50
13	Fagiano Okayama	38	13	9	16	43	58	−15	48
14	Shonan Bellmare	38	12	10	16	46	48	−2	46
15	Ehime FC	38	10	14	14	44	54	−10	44

Updated to match(es) played on December 3, 2011. Source: J.League Division 2
Rules for classification: 1st points; 2nd goal differential; 3rd goals scored; 4th head-to-head results; 5th disciplinary points; 6th draw. If two clubs are tied for first place, both clubs will be declared champions.

== J2 League ==
Match	Date	Team	Score	Team	Venue	Attendance
1	2011.03.06	Shonan Bellmare	5-0	Fagiano Okayama	Hiratsuka Stadium	10,255
8	2011.04.24	Kyoto Sanga FC	2-1	Fagiano Okayama	Kyoto Nishikyogoku Athletic Stadium	9,161
9	2011.04.30	Fagiano Okayama	0-0	Oita Trinita	Kanko Stadium	8,384
10	2011.05.04	Fagiano Okayama	2-2	Tochigi SC	Kanko Stadium	7,323
11	2011.05.08	Thespa Kusatsu	1-2	Fagiano Okayama	Shoda Shoyu Stadium Gunma	2,416
12	2011.05.15	JEF United Chiba	2-1	Fagiano Okayama	Fukuda Denshi Arena	10,330
13	2011.05.21	Fagiano Okayama	1-0	Yokohama FC	Kanko Stadium	9,374
14	2011.05.29	Consadole Sapporo	2-1	Fagiano Okayama	Sapporo Atsubetsu Stadium	5,567
15	2011.06.04	Fagiano Okayama	3-0	Giravanz Kitakyushu	Kanko Stadium	8,121
16	2011.06.12	Tokushima Vortis	2-2	Fagiano Okayama	Pocarisweat Stadium	4,885
17	2011.06.19	Fagiano Okayama	0-1	Mito HollyHock	Kanko Stadium	7,031
18	2011.06.25	Tokyo Verdy	4-0	Fagiano Okayama	Ajinomoto Stadium	2,846
2	2011.06.29	Fagiano Okayama	0-2	FC Tokyo	Kanko Stadium	8,403
19	2011.07.03	Ehime FC	2-3	Fagiano Okayama	Ningineer Stadium	3,855
20	2011.07.09	Fagiano Okayama	1-1	Shonan Bellmare	Kanko Stadium	8,621
21	2011.07.17	Giravanz Kitakyushu	1-2	Fagiano Okayama	Honjo Stadium	4,686
22	2011.07.24	Fagiano Okayama	1-2	Thespa Kusatsu	Kanko Stadium	8,344
23	2011.07.30	Tochigi SC	0-0	Fagiano Okayama	Tochigi Green Stadium	6,622
3	2011.08.06	Fagiano Okayama	4-0	Roasso Kumamoto	Kanko Stadium	5,455
24	2011.08.14	Fagiano Okayama	0-4	Tokyo Verdy	Kanko Stadium	10,490
25	2011.08.21	Oita Trinita	1-0	Fagiano Okayama	Oita Bank Dome	10,806
26	2011.08.26	Fagiano Okayama	1-0	Consadole Sapporo	Kanko Stadium	6,759
4	2011.09.03	FC Gifu	1-3	Fagiano Okayama	Gifu Nagaragawa Stadium	2,408
27	2011.09.10	Gainare Tottori	1-1	Fagiano Okayama	Tottori Bank Bird Stadium	7,943
5	2011.09.14	Sagan Tosu	6-0	Fagiano Okayama	Best Amenity Stadium	3,724
28	2011.09.17	Fagiano Okayama	0-1	JEF United Chiba	Kanko Stadium	6,305
29	2011.09.25	Mito HollyHock	1-1	Fagiano Okayama	K's denki Stadium Mito	3,022
30	2011.10.02	Fagiano Okayama	2-4	Sagan Tosu	Tsuyama Stadium	4,111
31	2011.10.16	FC Tokyo	3-0	Fagiano Okayama	Ajinomoto Stadium	17,384
6	2011.10.19	Fagiano Okayama	2-1	Gainare Tottori	Kanko Stadium	5,170
32	2011.10.23	Fagiano Okayama	1-1	Ehime FC	Kanko Stadium	7,283
7	2011.10.26	Fagiano Okayama	1-1	Kataller Toyama	Kanko Stadium	4,323
33	2011.10.30	Yokohama FC	0-1	Fagiano Okayama	NHK Spring Mitsuzawa Football Stadium	4,270
34	2011.11.06	Fagiano Okayama	1-2	FC Gifu	Kanko Stadium	6,431
35	2011.11.13	Kataller Toyama	0-2	Fagiano Okayama	Toyama Stadium	2,889
36	2011.11.20	Fagiano Okayama	2-1	Kyoto Sanga FC	Kanko Stadium	7,150
37	2011.11.27	Roasso Kumamoto	1-0	Fagiano Okayama	Kumamoto Athletics Stadium	7,981
38	2011.12.03	Fagiano Okayama	1-0	Tokushima Vortis	Kanko Stadium	8,833
