= Ryusuke Senoo =

Japanese footballer

Personal information
- Date of birth: February 20, 1986 (age 40)
- Place of birth: Okayama, Japan
- Height: 1.74 m (5 ft 8 1/2 in)
- Position: Midfielder

Youth career
- 2004–2007: Osaka Gakuin University

Senior career*
Years	Team	Apps	(Gls)
2008–2011	Fagiano Okayama	110	(9)
2013–2015	Fagiano Okayama	34	(4)
Total		144	(13)
- * Club domestic league appearances and goals

Ryusuke Senoo (妹尾 隆佑, Senoo Ryusuke; born February 20, 1986) is a former Japanese football player.

== Club statistics ==
Club performance			League		Cup		Total	
Season	Club	League	Apps	Goals	Apps	Goals	Apps	Goals
Japan			League		Emperor's Cup		Total	
2008	Fagiano Okayama	Football League	32	3	2	0	34	3
2009	Fagiano Okayama	J2 League	42	3	1	0	43	3
2010	Fagiano Okayama	J2 League	9	1	0	0	9	1
2011	Fagiano Okayama	J2 League						
Country	Japan		83	7	3	0	86	7
Total			83	7	3	0	86	7
