= Yuhei Ono =

Japanese footballer

Yuhei Ono 小野 雄平
Personal information
- Full name: Yuhei Ono
- Date of birth: July 1, 1985 (age 41)
- Place of birth: Osaka, Japan
- Height: 1.70 m (5 ft 7 in)
- Position: Midfielder

Youth career
- 2001–2003: Tokyo Verdy

Senior career*
Years	Team	Apps	(Gls)
2004–2006	Tokyo Verdy	3	(0)
2006	Tokushima Vortis	7	(0)
2007–2010	Fagiano Okayama		
2010	Fukushima United FC	4	(0)
2011	Grulla Morioka	10	(0)
2012–2013	Fukushima United FC	21	(1)
2014	Siam Navy		
Total		45+	(1+)
Medal record
Tokyo Verdy
Winner	Emperor's Cup	2004
- * Club domestic league appearances and goals

Yuhei Ono (小野 雄平, Ono Yūhei; born July 1, 1985) is a former Japanese football player.

== Career statistics ==
Appearances and goals by club, season and competition
Club	Season	League			Emperor's Cup		J.League Cup		Total	
Club	Season	Division	Apps	Goals	Apps	Goals	Apps	Goals	Apps	Goals
Tokyo Verdy	2004	J1 League	1	0	1	0	0	0	2	0
Tokyo Verdy	2005	J1 League	1	0	0	0	0	0	1	0
Tokyo Verdy	2006	J2 League	1	0	0	0	—		1	0
Tokushima Vortis	2006	J2 League	7	0	2	0	—		9	0
Fagiano Okayama	2007	Regional Leagues								
Fagiano Okayama	2008	Football League	33	2	2	0	—		35	2
Fagiano Okayama	2009	J2 League	21	0	1	0	—		22	0
Fagiano Okayama	2010	J2 League	0	0	0	0	—		0	0
Fukushima United FC	2010	Regional Leagues	4	0	1	0	—		5	0
Grulla Morioka	2011	Regional Leagues	10	0	1	0	—		11	0
Fukushima United FC	2012	Regional Leagues	12	1	2	1	—		14	2
Fukushima United FC	2013	Football League	9	0			—		9	0
Career total			64	2	6	0	0	0	70	2
