= Korean schools =

Korean schools may refer to:

- Education in North Korea
- Education in South Korea
- Education in Korea (disambiguation)
- Chōsen gakkō - North Korean schools in Japan
