= Hidenori Mago =

Japanese footballer

Personal information
- Date of birth: August 3, 1982 (age 44)
- Place of birth: Fukuoka, Japan
- Height: 1.82 m (5 ft 11 1/2 in)
- Position: Goalkeeper

Youth career
- 2001–2004: University of Teacher Education Fukuoka

Senior career*
Years	Team	Apps	(Gls)
2007–2008	Sagawa Shiga	71	(0)
2009–2014	Fagiano Okayama	86	(0)
Total		157	(0)
- * Club domestic league appearances and goals

Hidenori Mago (真子 秀徳, Hidenori Mago; born August 3, 1982) is a former Japanese football player.

== Club statistics ==
Club performance			League		Cup		Total	
Season	Club	League	Apps	Goals	Apps	Goals	Apps	Goals
Japan			League		Emperor's Cup		Total	
2005	Sagawa Express Osaka	Football League	22	0	-		22	0
2006	Sagawa Express Osaka	Football League	27	0	-		27	0
2007	Sagawa Express	Football League	7	0	0	0	7	0
2008	Sagawa Shiga	Football League	15	0	0	0	15	0
2009	Fagiano Okayama	J2 League	13	0	0	0	13	0
2010	Fagiano Okayama	J2 League	31	0	1	0	32	0
2011	Fagiano Okayama	J2 League						
Country	Japan		115	0	1	0	116	0
Total			115	0	1	0	116	0
