= Kenji Sekido =

Japanese footballer

Kenji Sekido 関戸 健二
Personal information
- Full name: Kenji Sekido
- Date of birth: January 7, 1990 (age 36)
- Place of birth: Kanagawa, Japan
- Height: 1.75 m (5 ft 9 in)
- Position: Midfielder

Youth career
- 2008–2011: Ryutsu Keizai University FC

Senior career*
Years	Team	Apps	(Gls)
2012–2022	Fagiano Okayama	241	(8)
Total		271	(8)
- * Club domestic league appearances and goals

Kenji Sekido (関戸 健二, born January 7, 1990) is a Japanese former footballer who played as a midfielder. He played all of his professional career for Fagiano Okayama, making almost 250 appearances and scoring 9 goals for the club over 11 seasons.

== Club statistics ==
Appearances and goals by club, season and competition
Club	Season	League			National cup (Note: Includes Emperors Cup)		Other		Total	
Club	Season	Division	Apps	Goals	Apps	Goals	Apps	Goals	Apps	Goals
Ryutsu Keizai University FC	2008	JFL	8	0	0	0	–		8	0
Ryutsu Keizai University FC	2009	JFL	20	0	1	0	–		21	0
Ryutsu Keizai University FC	2010	JFL	2	0	–		–		2	0
Ryutsu Keizai University FC	Total		30	0	1	0	0	0	31	0
Fagiano Okayama	2012	J.League Division 2	37	3	2	1	0	0	39	4
Fagiano Okayama	2013	J.League Division 2	23	0	1	0	0	0	24	0
Fagiano Okayama	2014	J.League Division 2	2	0	0	0	0	0	2	0
Fagiano Okayama	2015	J2 League	5	0	0	0	0	0	5	0
Fagiano Okayama	2016	J2 League	25	2	2	0	2 (Note: Appearance in J1/J2 play-offs)	0	29	2
Fagiano Okayama	2017	J2 League	40	1	0	0	0	0	40	1
Fagiano Okayama	2018	J2 League	20	2	0	0	0	0	20	2
Fagiano Okayama	2019	J2 League	41	0	0	0	0	0	41	0
Fagiano Okayama	2020	J2 League	39	0	0	0	0	0	39	0
Fagiano Okayama	2021	J2 League	8	0	0	0	0	0	8	0
Fagiano Okayama	2022	J2 League	1	0	1	0	0	0	2	0
Fagiano Okayama	Total		241	8	6	1	2	0	249	9
Career total			271	8	7	1	2	0	280	9
