= Takanori Chiaki =

Japanese footballer

Takanori Chiaki 千明 聖典
Personal information
- Full name: Takanori Chiaki
- Date of birth: July 19, 1987 (age 39)
- Place of birth: Ōme, Tokyo, Japan
- Height: 1.65 m (5 ft 5 in)
- Position: Midfielder

Team information
- Current team: SC Sagamihara
- Number: 38

Youth career
- 2003–2005: RKU Kashiwa High School

College career
Years	Team	Apps	(Gls)
2006–2009	Ryutsu Keizai University		

Senior career*
Years	Team	Apps	(Gls)
2006–2009	Ryutsu Keizai University FC	44	(3)
2010–2015	Fagiano Okayama	172	(2)
2016	Oita Trinita	13	(0)
2017–	SC Sagamihara	23	(0)
- * Club domestic league appearances and goals as of 23 February 2018

Takanori Chiaki (千明 聖典, born July 19, 1987) is a Japanese football player for SC Sagamihara.

== Career statistics ==
Updated to 23 February 2018.

Appearances and goals by club, season and competition
Club	Season	League			Emperor's Cup		Total	
Club	Season	Division	Apps	Goals	Apps	Goals	Apps	Goals
Ryutsu Keizai University FC	2006	JFL	5	0	0	0	5	0
Ryutsu Keizai University FC	2007	JFL	20	0	0	0	20	0
Ryutsu Keizai University FC	2008	JFL	10	0	2	0	12	0
Ryutsu Keizai University FC	2009	JFL	9	3	2	2	11	5
Fagiano Okayama	2010	J2 League	11	0	0	0	11	0
Fagiano Okayama	2011	J2 League	33	1	2	0	35	1
Fagiano Okayama	2012	J2 League	36	0	2	0	38	0
Fagiano Okayama	2013	J2 League	39	1	1	0	40	0
Fagiano Okayama	2014	J2 League	34	0	1	0	35	0
Fagiano Okayama	2015	J2 League	19	0	0	0	19	0
Oita Trinita	2016	J3 League	13	0	2	0	15	0
SC Sagamihara	2017	J3 League	23	0	–		23	0
Career total			252	5	12	2	264	7
