= Tadashi Takeda =

Japanese footballer

Tadashi Takeda 竹田 忠嗣
Personal information
- Full name: Tadashi Takeda
- Date of birth: 27 July 1986 (age 40)
- Place of birth: Penang, Malaysia
- Height: 1.73 m (5 ft 8 in)
- Position: Centre back

Youth career
- 1999–2004: JEF United Ichihara Youth

Senior career*
Years	Team	Apps	(Gls)
2005–2008	JEF United Chiba	0	(0)
2006–2008	→ JEF Reserves (loan)	49	(4)
2008–2017	Fagiano Okayama	231	(6)
2018–2021	FC Gifu	85	(2)
Medal record
JEF United Chiba
Winner	J.League Cup	2005
Winner	J.League Cup	2006
- * Club domestic league appearances and goals

Tadashi Takeda (竹田 忠嗣, born 27 July 1986) is a Japanese former professional football player who played as a defender.

== Personal life ==
Born in Malaysia to Japanese parents, Takeda returned to Japan with his parents at the age of two, and was raised in the Greater Tokyo Area. He first attended Yasumatsu Elementary School in Tokorozawa, Saitama. After his graduation, he attended Utase Junior High School in Chiba, and entered the JEF United Chiba youth system in 1999. He first played for JEF United Ichihara Junior Youth Maihama (U-15), and then moved up to JEF United Ichihara Youth team (U-19) while he completed his studies at Tokyo Gakkan Urayasu High School and Keio University, both in Tokyo. As of 2020, he had one daughter and one son.

== Club career ==
Takeda signed a professional contract in 2005. In July 2008, he transferred to Fagiano Okayama. In 2018, he transferred to FC Gifu, with whom he played until his retirement from professional football following the 2021 season.

== Career statistics ==
Updated to end of 2018 season.

Appearances and goals by club, season and competition
Club	Season	League			Emperor's Cup		J.League Cup		Total	
Club	Season	Division	Apps	Goals	Apps	Goals	Apps	Goals	Apps	Goals
JEF United Chiba	2005	J1 League	0	0	0	0	0	0	0	0
JEF United Chiba	2006	J1 League	0	0	0	0	0	0	0	0
JEF United Chiba	2007	J1 League	0	0	0	0	0	0	0	0
JEF United Chiba	2008	J1 League	0	0	0	0	0	0	0	0
Fagiano Okayama	2008	JFL	1	0	3	0	—		4	0
Fagiano Okayama	2009	J2 League	37	0	1	0	—		38	0
Fagiano Okayama	2010	J2 League	2	0	0	0	—		2	0
Fagiano Okayama	2011	J2 League	24	2	1	0	—		25	2
Fagiano Okayama	2012	J2 League	34	1	1	0	—		35	1
Fagiano Okayama	2013	J2 League	40	1	0	0	—		40	1
Fagiano Okayama	2014	J2 League	12	0	0	0	—		12	0
Fagiano Okayama	2015	J2 League	33	0	1	0	—		34	0
Fagiano Okayama	2016	J2 League	38	1	2	0	—		40	1
Fagiano Okayama	2017	J2 League	10	1	1	0	—		11	1
FC Gifu	2018	J2 League	34	1	1	0	—		35	1
Career total			265	7	11	0	0	0	276	7
