= Masahiko Sawaguchi =

Japanese footballer

Masahiko Sawaguchi 澤口 雅彦
Personal information
- Full name: Masahiko Sawaguchi
- Date of birth: July 22, 1985 (age 41)
- Place of birth: Kamisu, Ibaraki, Japan
- Height: 1.74 m (5 ft 8 1/2 in)
- Position: Defender

Team information
- Current team: Ococias Kyoto AC

Youth career
- 2001–2004: Kashima High School

Senior career*
Years	Team	Apps	(Gls)
2005–2007	Ryutsu Keizai University FC	44	(2)
2008	FC Ryukyu	31	(2)
2009–2018	Fagiano Okayama	232	(12)
2019–	Ococias Kyoto AC		
- * Club domestic league appearances and goals as of 31 December 2018

Masahiko Sawaguchi (澤口 雅彦, born July 22, 1985) is a Japanese football player who plays for Ococias Kyoto AC.

== Career ==
On 8 February 2019, Sawaguchi joined Ococias Kyoto AC.

== Club statistics ==
Updated to 23 February 2018.

Club performance			League		Cup		Total	
Season	Club	League	Apps	Goals	Apps	Goals	Apps	Goals
Japan			League		Emperor's Cup		Total	
2005	Ryutsu Keizai; University FC	JFL	3	0	-		3	0
2006	Ryutsu Keizai; University FC	JFL	19	2	0	0	19	2
2007	Ryutsu Keizai; University FC	JFL	22	0	0	0	22	0
2008	FC Ryukyu	JFL	31	2	-		31	2
2009	Fagiano Okayama	J2 League	39	3	0	0	39	3
2010	Fagiano Okayama	J2 League	27	2	1	0	28	2
2011	Fagiano Okayama	J2 League	37	2	2	0	39	2
2012	Fagiano Okayama	J2 League	41	0	1	0	42	0
2013	Fagiano Okayama	J2 League	13	2	0	0	13	2
2014	Fagiano Okayama	J2 League	6	0	0	0	6	0
2015	Fagiano Okayama	J2 League	6	0	0	0	6	0
2016	Fagiano Okayama	J2 League	24	2	1	0	25	2
2017	Fagiano Okayama	J2 League	25	1	1	0	26	1
Total			293	16	6	0	299	16
