= Kohei Tanaka (footballer) =

Japanese footballer

Kohei Tanaka 田中 康平
Personal information
- Full name: Kohei Tanaka
- Date of birth: December 11, 1985 (age 40)
- Place of birth: Ikeda, Hokkaido, Japan
- Height: 1.80 m (5 ft 11 in)
- Position: Forward

Youth career
- 2001–2003: Obihiro Kita High School

Senior career*
Years	Team	Apps	(Gls)
2004–2007	Kashima Antlers	3	(0)
2005	→ Montedio Yamagata (loan)	3	(1)
2008–2009	Vegalta Sendai	23	(2)
2010–2011	FC Ryukyu	43	(6)
2012–2017	Tokachi FC		
Total		72+	(9+)
Medal record
Kashima Antlers
Winner	J1 League	2007
Runner-up	J.League Cup	2006
Winner	Emperor's Cup	2007
- * Club domestic league appearances and goals

Kohei Tanaka (田中 康平, Tanaka Kohei; born December 11, 1985) is a former Japanese football player.

== Club statistics ==
Updated to 5 September 2014.

Club performance			League		Cup		League Cup		Total	
Season	Club	League	Apps	Goals	Apps	Goals	Apps	Goals	Apps	Goals
Japan			League		Emperor's Cup		J.League Cup		Total	
2004	Kashima Antlers	J1 League	0	0	0	0	0	0	0	0
2005	Montedio Yamagata	J2 League	3	1	1	0	-		4	1
2006	Kashima Antlers	J1 League	2	0	1	0	1	0	4	0
2007	Kashima Antlers	J1 League	1	0	0	0	1	0	2	0
2008	Vegalta Sendai	J2 League	7	1	2	0	-		9	1
2009	Vegalta Sendai	J2 League	16	1	1	0	-		17	1
2010	FC Ryukyu	JFL	22	5	2	1	-		24	6
2011	FC Ryukyu	JFL	21	1	0	0	-		21	1
2012	Tokachi FC	JRL (Hokkaido)	14	5	-		-		14	5
2013	Tokachi FC	JRL (Hokkaido)	13	7	-		-		13	7
Career total			99	21	7	1	2	0	108	22
