= Hirotsugu Nakabayashi =

Japanese footballer

Hirotsugu Nakabayashi 中林 洋次
Personal information
- Full name: Hirotsugu Nakabayashi
- Date of birth: 28 April 1986 (age 40)
- Place of birth: Kanagawa-ku, Yokohama, Japan
- Height: 1.82 m (6 ft 0 in)
- Position: Goalkeeper

Team information
- Current team: Nankatsu SC
- Number: 1

Youth career
- 1999–2001: Yokohama F. Marinos
- 2002–2004: Ichiritsu Funabashi High School

Senior career*
Years	Team	Apps	(Gls)
2005–2008	Sagan Tosu	4	(0)
2008–2011	Sanfrecce Hiroshima	28	(0)
2012–2016	Fagiano Okayama	193	(0)
2017–2019	Sanfrecce Hiroshima	15	(0)
2019	→ Yokohama F. Marinos (loan)	1	(0)
2020–2022	Yokohama F. Marinos	0	(0)
2023–	Nankatsu SC	0	(0)
Medal record
Sanfrecce Hiroshima
Runner-up	J1 League	2018
Runner-up	J.League Cup	2010
- * Club domestic league appearances and goals as of 9 January 2023, 0:40 (UTC)

Hirotsugu Nakabayashi (中林 洋次, Nakabayashi Hirotsugu; born April 28, 1986 in Kanagawa-ku, Yokohama), commonly referred to as Woods, is a Japanese football player who playing for Nankatsu SC from 2023.

== Career ==
On 22 December 2022, Nakabayashi joined to Kantō club part of JRL, Nankatsu SC for upcoming 2023 season as free transfer.

== Career statistics ==
Updated to the start from 2023 season.

Club	Season	League			Emperor's Cup		J. League Cup		Continental		Other (Note: Includes J1 entry playoff.)		Total	
Club	Season	Division	Apps	Goals	Apps	Goals	Apps	Goals	Apps	Goals	Apps	Goals	Apps	Goals
Sagan Tosu	2005	J. League Division 2	2	0	0	0	–		–		–		2	0
Sagan Tosu	2006	J. League Division 2	0	0	0	0	–		–		–		0	0
Sagan Tosu	2007	J. League Division 2	2	0	0	0	–		–		–		2	0
Sagan Tosu	2008	J. League Division 2	0	0	–		–		–		–		0	0
Sanfrecce Hiroshima	2008	J. League Division 2	0	0	0	0	–		–		–		0	0
Sanfrecce Hiroshima	2009	J. League Division 1	28	0	0	0	4	0	–		–		32	0
Sanfrecce Hiroshima	2010	J. League Division 1	0	0	1	0	1	0	1	0	-		2	0
Sanfrecce Hiroshima	2011	J. League Division 1	0	0	2	0	1	0	–		–		3	0
Fagiano Okayama	2012	J. League Division 2	42	0	1	0	–		–		–		43	0
Fagiano Okayama	2013	J. League Division 2	40	0	1	0	–		–		–		41	0
Fagiano Okayama	2014	J. League Division 2	37	0	1	0	–		–		–		38	0
Fagiano Okayama	2015	J2 League	42	0	0	0	–		–		–		42	0
Fagiano Okayama	2016	J2 League	42	0	0	0	–		–		2	0	42	0
Sanfrecce Hiroshima	2017	J1 League	14	0	1	0	4	0	–		–		19	0
Sanfrecce Hiroshima	2018	J1 League	0	0	0	0	5	0	–		–		5	0
Sanfrecce Hiroshima	2019	J1 League	1	0	0	0	0	0	4	0	–		5	0
Yokohama F. Marinos	2019	J1 League	1	0	0	0	0	0	–		–		1	0
Yokohama F. Marinos	2020	J1 League	0	0	0	0	0	0	–		–		0	0
Yokohama F. Marinos	2021	J1 League	0	0	0	0	0	0	–		–		0	0
Yokohama F. Marinos	2022	J1 League	0	0	0	0	0	0	–		–		0	0
Nankatsu SC	2023	Kantō Soccer League	0	0	0	0	–		–		–		0	0
Career total			251	0	7	0	15	0	5	0	2	0	280	0

== Honours ==
=== Club ===
Sanfrecce Hiroshima

- J2 League: 2008

Yokohama F. Marinos

- J1 League: 2019, 2022
