= Ryujiro Ueda =

Japanese footballer

Ryujiro Ueda 植田 龍仁朗
Personal information
- Full name: Ryujiro Ueda
- Date of birth: January 29, 1988 (age 38)
- Place of birth: Kadoma, Osaka, Japan
- Height: 1.85 m (6 ft 1 in)
- Position: Defender

Youth career
- 2003–2005: Gamba Osaka

Senior career*
| Years | Team | Apps | (Gls) |
| 2006–2008 | Gamba Osaka | 0 | (0) |
| 2009–2015 | Fagiano Okayama | 150 | (7) |
| 2016–2019 | Roasso Kumamoto | 75 | (3) |
Medal record
Gamba Osaka
| Winner | AFC Champions League | 2008 |
| Winner | J.League Cup | 2007 |
| Winner | Emperor's Cup | 2008 |
| Runner-up | Emperor's Cup | 2006 |
- * Club domestic league appearances and goals as of 10 January 2020

Ryujiro Ueda (植田 龍仁朗, Ueda Ryūjirō; born January 29, 1988, in Kadoma, Osaka) is a Japanese former football player who last played for Roasso Kumamoto.

== Career ==
On October 30, 2011, he scored the only goal for his team against Yokohama FC with his head from his own half. The distance of 58.6 metres was thought to be a world record, but later measurements showed that the ball was headed in from 57.8 metres out. That means Jone Samuelsen still holds the record with 58.13 metres.

Ueda retired at the end of the 2019 season.

== Career statistics ==
Updated to 23 February 2017.

Appearances and goals by club, season and competition
| Club | Season | League | | | Emperor's Cup | | J.League Cup | | Total | |
| Club | Season | Division | Apps | Goals | Apps | Goals | Apps | Goals | Apps | Goals |
|---|---|---|---|---|---|---|---|---|---|---|
| Gamba Osaka | 2006 | J1 League | 0 | 0 | 0 | 0 | 0 | 0 | 0 | 0 |
| Gamba Osaka | 2007 | J1 League | 0 | 0 | 0 | 0 | 0 | 0 | 0 | 0 |
| Gamba Osaka | 2008 | J1 League | 0 | 0 | 0 | 0 | 0 | 0 | 0 | 0 |
| Fagiano Okayama | 2009 | J2 League | 31 | 0 | 0 | 0 | — | | 31 | 0 |
| Fagiano Okayama | 2010 | J2 League | 7 | 0 | 0 | 0 | — | | 7 | 0 |
| Fagiano Okayama | 2011 | J2 League | 30 | 3 | 2 | 0 | — | | 32 | 3 |
| Fagiano Okayama | 2012 | J2 League | 34 | 1 | 2 | 0 | — | | 36 | 1 |
| Fagiano Okayama | 2013 | J2 League | 33 | 3 | 0 | 0 | — | | 33 | 3 |
| Fagiano Okayama | 2014 | J2 League | 5 | 0 | 1 | 0 | — | | 6 | 0 |
| Fagiano Okayama | 2015 | J2 League | 10 | 0 | 0 | 0 | — | | 10 | 0 |
| Roasso Kumamoto | 2016 | J2 League | 36 | 2 | 0 | 0 | — | | 36 | 2 |
| Career total | | | 186 | 9 | 5 | 0 | 0 | 0 | 191 | 9 |
