= Masaki Chugo =

Japanese footballer (born 1982)

Masaki Chugo 中後 雅喜
Personal information
- Full name: Masaki Chugo
- Date of birth: May 16, 1982 (age 44)
- Place of birth: Chiba, Japan
- Height: 1.78 m (5 ft 10 in)
- Position: Midfielder

Team information
- Current team: Kashima Antlers (Assistant Manager)

Youth career
- 1998–2000: JEF United Ichihara
- 2001–2004: Komazawa University

Senior career*
Years	Team	Apps	(Gls)
2005–2008	Kashima Antlers	69	(4)
2009–2010	JEF United Chiba	27	(0)
2011	Cerezo Osaka	24	(0)
2012–2017	Tokyo Verdy	142	(11)
Total		262	(15)

Managerial career
- 2020–2023: Tokyo Verdy (youth)
- 2024: Kashima Antlers (assistant)
- 2024–2025: Kashima Antlers
- 2025–: Kashima Antlers (assistant)
Medal record
Kashima Antlers
Winner	J1 League	2007
Winner	J1 League	2008
Runner-up	J.League Cup	2006
Winner	Emperor's Cup	2007
- * Club domestic league appearances and goals

Masaki Chugo (中後 雅喜, Chūgo Masaki; born May 16, 1982) is a Japanese professional football manager and former player who is the assistant manager of J1 League club Kashima Antlers.

== Managerial career ==
On 9 October 2024, Chugo was announced as manager of Kashima Antlers.

== Club statistics ==
Club performance			League		Cup		League Cup		Continental		Total	
Season	Club	League	Apps	Goals	Apps	Goals	Apps	Goals	Apps	Goals	Apps	Goals
Japan			League		Emperor's Cup		J.League Cup		AFC		Total	
2005	Kashima Antlers	J1 League	0	0	0	0	2	0	-		2	0
2006	Kashima Antlers	J1 League	17	0	4	1	6	0	-		27	1
2007	Kashima Antlers	J1 League	28	4	2	0	9	0	-		39	4
2008	Kashima Antlers	J1 League	24	0	2	0	1	0	1	0	28	0
2009	JEF United Ichihara; Chiba	J1 League	19	0	1	0	2	0	-		22	0
2010	JEF United Ichihara; Chiba	J2 League	8	0	2	0	-		-		10	0
2011	Cerezo Osaka	J1 League	24	0	1	0	1	0	8	0	34	0
2012	Tokyo Verdy	J2 League	19	2	1	0	-		-		20	2
2013	Tokyo Verdy	J2 League	15	0	1	0	-		-		16	0
2014	Tokyo Verdy	J2 League	24	1	0	0	-		-		24	1
2015	Tokyo Verdy	J2 League	40	4	2	0	-		-		42	4
2016	Tokyo Verdy	J2 League	31	3	2	0	-		-		33	3
2017	Tokyo Verdy	J2 League	13	1	1	0	-		-		14	1
Total			262	15	18	1	21	0	9	0	310	16

== Team honours ==
- J1 League - 2007, 2008
- Emperor's Cup - 2007
