= Ryo Tadokoro =

Japanese footballer

Ryo Tadokoro 田所 諒
Personal information
- Full name: Ryo Tadokoro
- Date of birth: April 8, 1986 (age 40)
- Place of birth: Neyagawa, Osaka, Japan
- Height: 1.75 m (5 ft 9 in)
- Position: Left back

Team information
- Current team: Yokohama FC (youth coach)

Youth career
- 2005–2008: Osaka University of Health and Sport Sciences

Senior career*
Years	Team	Apps	(Gls)
2009–2015	Fagiano Okayama	208	(11)
2016–2019	Yokohama FC	94	(0)
- * Club domestic league appearances and goals

Ryo Tadokoro (田所 諒, born April 8, 1986) is a Japanese retired football player.

== Club statistics ==
Updated to 23 February 2018.

Club performance			League		Cup		Total	
Season	Club	League	Apps	Goals	Apps	Goals	Apps	Goals
Japan			League		Emperor's Cup		Total	
2009	Fagiano Okayama	J2 League	16	0	0	0	16	0
2010	Fagiano Okayama	J2 League	30	1	1	1	31	2
2011	Fagiano Okayama	J2 League	14	0	1	0	15	0
2012	Fagiano Okayama	J2 League	34	4	0	0	34	4
2013	Fagiano Okayama	J2 League	40	3	1	0	41	3
2014	Fagiano Okayama	J2 League	40	2	0	0	40	2
2015	Fagiano Okayama	J2 League	34	1	1	0	35	1
2016	Yokohama FC	J2 League	31	0	3	0	34	0
2017	Yokohama FC	J2 League	39	0	0	0	39	0
Total			278	11	7	1	285	12
