= Tetsu Sugiyama =

Japanese footballer (born 1981)

Tetsu Sugiyama 杉山 哲
Personal information
- Full name: Tetsu Sugiyama
- Date of birth: June 26, 1981 (age 45)
- Place of birth: Kumamoto, Japan
- Height: 1.84 m (6 ft 1/2 in)
- Position: Goalkeeper

Team information
- Current team: Tokyo United FC
- Number: 1

Youth career
- 1997–1999: Kumamoto Kokufu High School
- 2000–2003: Fukuoka University

Senior career*
Years	Team	Apps	(Gls)
2004–2011	Kashima Antlers	0	(0)
2012–2017	Hokkaido Consadole Sapporo	49	(0)
2018–	Tokyo United FC	17	(0)
Medal record
Kashima Antlers
Winner	J1 League	2007
Winner	J1 League	2008
Winner	J1 League	2009
Winner	J.League Cup	2011
Runner-up	J.League Cup	2006
Winner	Emperor's Cup	2007
Winner	Emperor's Cup	2010
- * Club domestic league appearances and goals as of end of 2018 season

Tetsu Sugiyama (杉山 哲, Sugiyama Tetsu; born June 26, 1981) is a Japanese football player.

== Career statistics ==
Updated to 23 February 2016.

Appearances and goals by club, season and competition
Club	Season	League			Emperor's Cup		J.League Cup		Total	
Club	Season	Division	Apps	Goals	Apps	Goals	Apps	Goals	Apps	Goals
Kashima Antlers	2004	J1 League	0	0	0	0	0	0	0	0
Kashima Antlers	2005	J1 League	0	0	0	0	1	0	1	0
Kashima Antlers	2006	J1 League	0	0	0	0	0	0	0	0
Kashima Antlers	2007	J1 League	0	0	0	0	0	0	0	0
Kashima Antlers	2008	J1 League	0	0	0	0	0	0	0	0
Kashima Antlers	2009	J1 League	0	0	0	0	0	0	0	0
Kashima Antlers	2010	J1 League	0	0	0	0	0	0	0	0
Kashima Antlers	2011	J1 League	0	0	0	0	0	0	0	0
Consadole Sapporo	2012	J1 League	11	0	0	0	2	0	13	0
Consadole Sapporo	2013	J2 League	38	0	0	0	—		38	0
Consadole Sapporo	2014	J2 League	0	0	1	0	—		1	0
Consadole Sapporo	2015	J2 League	0	0	1	0	—		1	0
Career total			49	0	2	0	3	0	54	0
