= Keita Goto (footballer) =

Japanese footballer

Keita Goto 後藤 圭太
Personal information
- Full name: Keita Goto
- Date of birth: 8 September 1986 (age 40)
- Place of birth: Bando, Ibaraki, Japan
- Height: 1.83 m (6 ft 0 in)
- Position: Defender

Team information
- Current team: Velago Ikoma (manager)

Youth career
- 2002–2004: Kashima Antlers

Senior career*
Years	Team	Apps	(Gls)
2005–2009	Kashima Antlers	0	(0)
2010–2014	Fagiano Okayama	166	(9)
2015–2017	Matsumoto Yamaga FC	50	(2)
2018–2021	Fagiano Okayama	42	(2)
2021	SC Sagamihara	5	(0)
2022	FC Tiamo Hirakata	18	(1)
Total		281	(14)

Managerial career
- 2024: Toko Customs United
- 2025–: Velago Ikoma
Medal record
Kashima Antlers
Winner	J1 League	2007
Winner	J1 League	2008
Winner	J1 League	2009
Runner-up	J.League Cup	2006
Winner	Emperor's Cup	2007
- * Club domestic league appearances and goals as of end of 2018 season

Keita Goto (後藤 圭太, Goto Keita; born 8 September 1986) is a Japanese professional football manager and former player. He currently manager of Kansai Soccer League club, Velago Ikoma.

== Career statistics ==
Updated to 23 February 2018.

Appearances and goals by club, season and competition
Club	Season	League			Emperor's Cup		J.League Cup		Total	
Club	Season	Division	Apps	Goals	Apps	Goals	Apps	Goals	Apps	Goals
Kashima Antlers	2005	J1 League	0	0	0	0	1	0	1	0
Kashima Antlers	2006	J1 League	0	0	0	0	1	0	1	0
Kashima Antlers	2007	J1 League	0	0	0	0	0	0	0	0
Kashima Antlers	2008	J1 League	0	0	0	0	0	0	0	0
Kashima Antlers	2009	J1 League	0	0	0	0	0	0	0	0
Fagiano Okayama	2010	J2 League	28	1	1	0	—		29	1
Fagiano Okayama	2011	J2 League	26	1	1	0	—		27	1
Fagiano Okayama	2012	J2 League	41	1	2	1	—		43	2
Fagiano Okayama	2013	J2 League	34	3	2	0	—		36	3
Fagiano Okayama	2014	J2 League	37	3	1	0	—		38	3
Matsumoto Yamaga FC	2015	J1 League	10	0	1	0	2	1	13	1
Matsumoto Yamaga FC	2016	J2 League	20	1	2	0	–		22	1
Matsumoto Yamaga FC	2017	J2 League	20	1	3	0	–		23	1
Career total			216	11	13	1	4	1	233	13
