= Fagiano Okayama =

Japanese football club

Fagiano Okayama ファジアーノ岡山
- Full name: Fagiano Okayama
- Nickname: Fagi (ファジ)
- Founded: 2004; 22 years ago
- Stadium: JFE Harenokuni Stadium; Okayama, Okayama
- Capacity: 15,479
- Chairman: Shinya Kitagawa
- Manager: Takashi Kiyama
- League: J1 League
- 2026: J1 League, 11th of 20
- Website: fagiano-okayama.com
Home colours	Away colours

Fagiano Okayama (ファジアーノ岡山, Fajiāno Okayama) is a Japanese football club based in Okayama, the capital of Okayama Prefecture. The club currently plays in the J1 League, which is the top tier of football in the country.

== History ==
=== Foundation and early development (1975–2008) ===
The origins of the club trace back to 1975 with the establishment of Kawasaki Steel Mizushima FC, who then moved to Kobe and formed a new identity; that side is now known as Vissel Kobe. Former players still in Okayama formed a new club called the River Free Kickers (RFK).

==== As Fagiano Okayama ====
Following structural changes within the club and the broader development of professional football in Japan, the team was reorganised in the early 2000s as part of efforts to establish a professional club representing Okayama Prefecture. In 2004, the club adopted the name Fagiano Okayama. The name Fagiano comes from the Italian word for pheasant, a bird associated with the folklore and symbolism of the Okayama region. The club continued its development through the regional league system and gained promotion to the Japan Football League, the highest amateur tier at the time. After strong performances and meeting the licensing requirements for professional football, Fagiano Okayama secured entry into the professional league structure.

In 2005, Fagiano Okayama were promoted into the Chūgoku Soccer League. In July 2007, Fagiano became the first club ever to attain the J.League Associate Membership while still playing in a division below the JFL. On 2 December 2007, Fagiano gained promotion to the JFL after winning first place in the regional playoff games.

=== Entry into J.League (2009) ===
In 2008, Fagiano secured 4th place in the last JFL match week, thereby qualifying for J.League Division 2 promotion below Tochigi SC and Kataller Toyama. On 1 December 2008, the promotion was made official by J.League, and Okayama competed in J.League Division 2 for the first time in their history from 2009 season.

In 2009, Fagiano Okayama joined the J2 League for the first time, marking the club’s debut in the professional divisions of the J.League. The step up to the national professional level proved challenging, and the club finished near the bottom of the table in its inaugural season.

Despite the early struggles, participation in the J2 League represented a significant milestone for football in Okayama Prefecture, establishing the club as the region’s representative in the national professional league system.

=== Establishing stability in J2 (2010–2019) ===
During the 2010s, Fagiano Okayama gradually established themselves as a competitive club in the J2 League. The team improved its performances season by season and began to challenge for promotion places.

One of the club's most notable seasons came in 2016 when Fagiano finished in the top six of the J2 standings and qualified for the promotion play-offs for the first time in their history. Although they were unable to secure promotion to the J1 League, the season marked a major step forward for the club.

Throughout the decade, Fagiano built a reputation for developing domestic players and maintaining strong support within Okayama Prefecture.

=== Continued growth and promotion ambitions (2020–present) ===
In the early 2020s, Fagiano Okayama continued to compete in the J2 League while pursuing their ambition of reaching the top division. The club remained competitive in the league and continued to strengthen its organisational structure and youth development programmes.

On 7 December 2024, Fagiano Okayama secured promotion to the J1 League for the first time in their history after defeating Vegalta Sendai 2–0 in the promotion play-off final, ending their 16-year stay in the J2 League. They placed 13th out of 20 in the 2025 season and 11th in the abbreviated J1 100 Year Vision League in early 2026.

== Team image ==
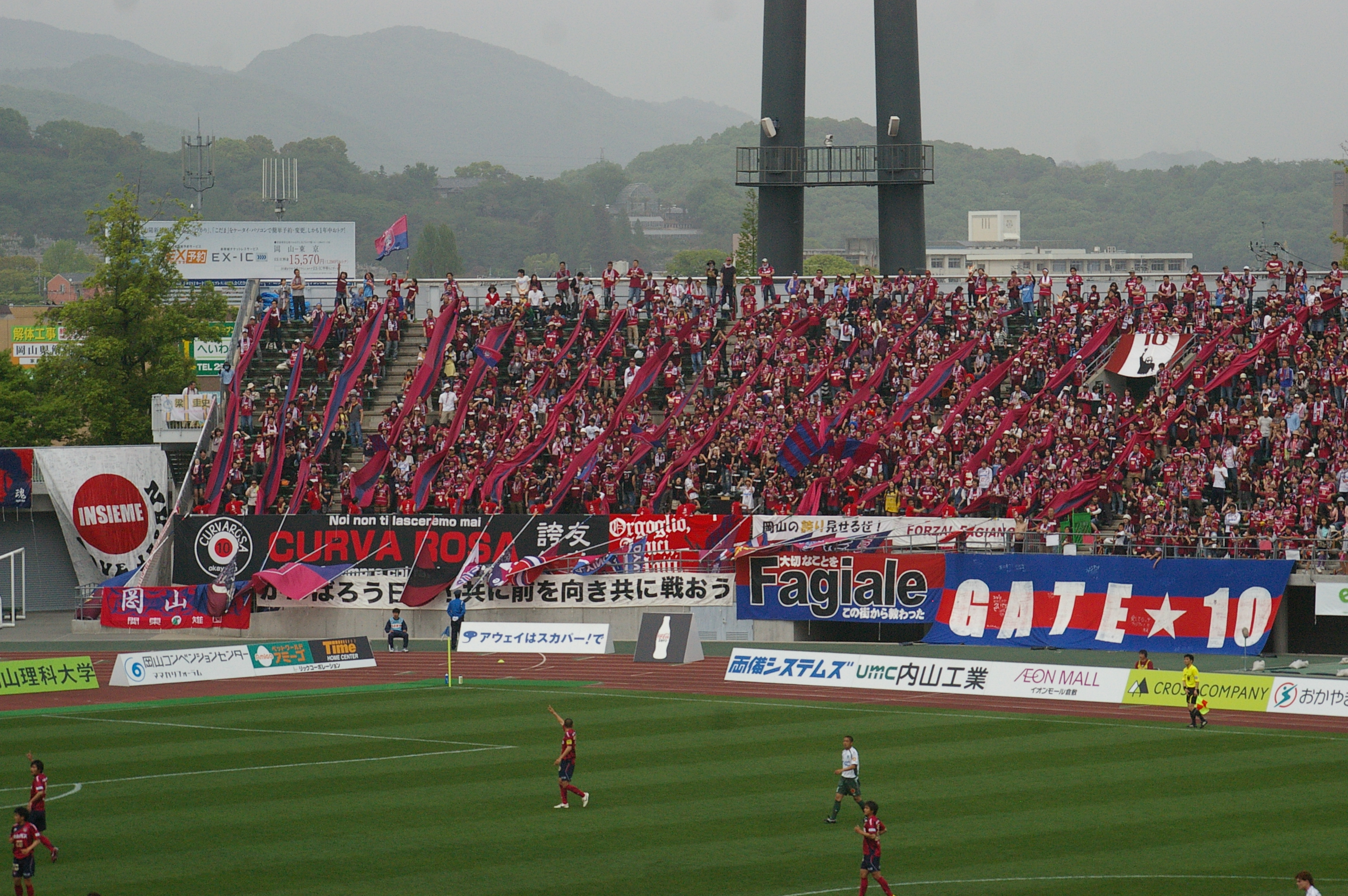
Fagiano Okayama supporters

=== Name origin ===
Fagiano (Italian: fagiano, lit. 'pheasant') is a reference to the pheasant that was a companion of local legend character Momotarō.

Their mascot Fagimaru is based on the specific species native to Japan, the green pheasant.

=== Rivalries ===
==== Setouchi Rivalry ====
Fagiano Okayama also shares a local rivalry with Kamatamare Sanuki. The clubs are located on opposite sides of the Seto Inland Sea and have faced each other frequently in the J2 League and lower divisions.

The rivalry is driven largely by geographic proximity and regional pride, with supporters from both sides traveling across the Seto Inland Sea region to attend matches. Encounters between the clubs are often seen as important fixtures for fans in the surrounding areas.

==== Chūgoku Derby ====
The main regional rivalry of Fagiano Okayama is with neighbouring club Sanfrecce Hiroshima. Matches between the two sides are often referred to as the Chūgoku Derby, reflecting the geographic rivalry within the Chūgoku region.

Although both clubs have spent much of their history in the different divisions of the J.League, encounters between them are particularly in cup competitions such as the Emperor's Cup which have attracted strong regional interest. The rivalry represents competition between the prefectures of Okayama Prefecture and Hiroshima Prefecture.

== Stadium ==
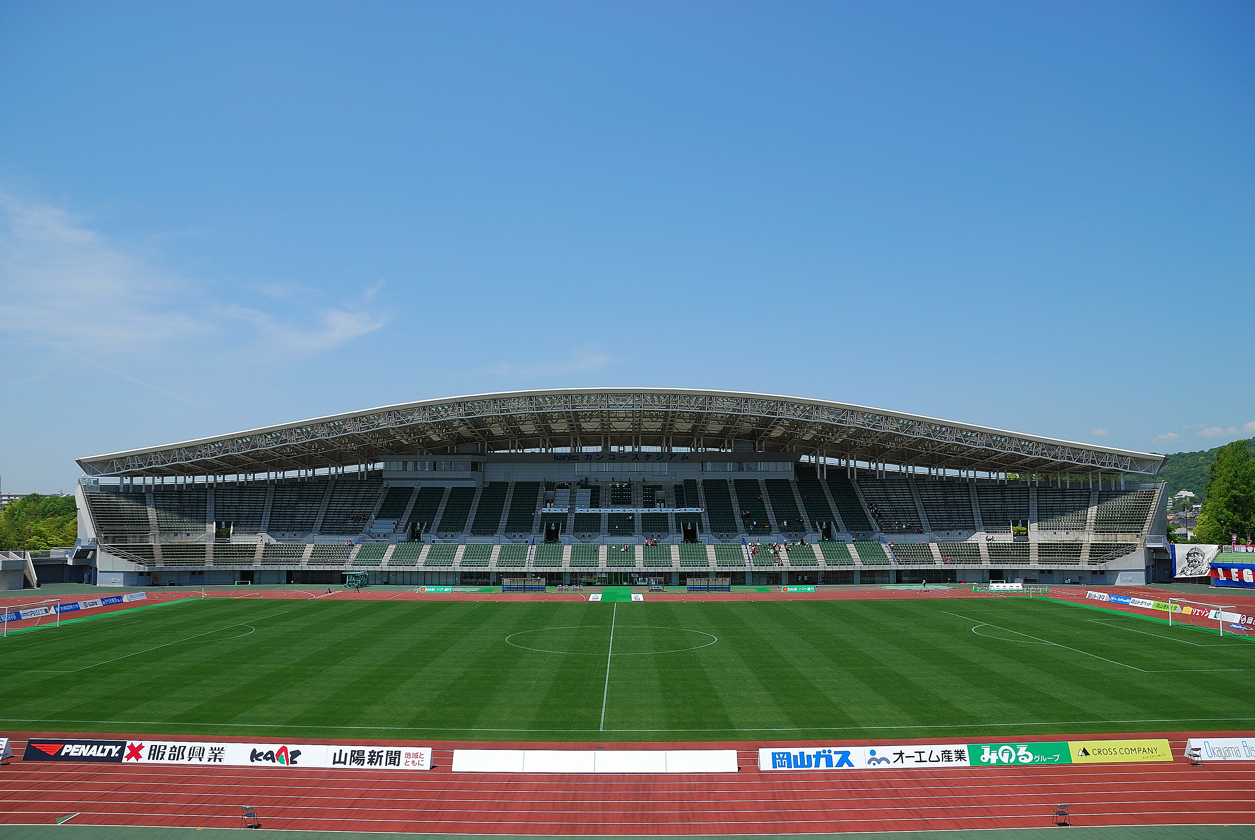
JFE Harenokuni Stadium

JFE Harenokuni Stadium is the home ground of Fagiano Okayama. The stadium is located in Okayama City and has a seating capacity of approximately 15,479 spectators. Opened in 2003, the venue is a multi-purpose stadium primarily used for football and athletics. It serves as the main home venue for Fagiano Okayama’s matches in the J.League competitions, including the J2 League, as well as domestic cup tournaments such as the Emperor's Cup. Fagiano formerly played at the Tsuyama Stadium in Tsuyama before moving to the current JFE Harenokuni Stadium.

Training grounds are at the Masada Soccer Stadium and Prefecture Kanzakiyama Park Athletics Stadium, both are in Okayama City.

== Kit suppliers and shirt sponsors ==
Fagiano's main sponsor is Okayama Gas, and their back sponsor is the Sanyo Shinbun, a local newspaper in Okayama.

=== Season ===
Period	Kit manufacturer	Main sponsors
2004–2009	(Japan) Ozaki	(Japan) Okayama Gas
2010–2011	(Brazil) Penalty	(Japan) Okayama Gas
2012–present	(Brazil) Penalty	(Japan) GROP

=== Kit evolution ===
Home kit
2008–2009	2010	2011	2012	2013
2014	2015	2016	2017	2018
2019	2020	2021	2022	2023
2024	2025	2026–		

Away kit
2008–2009	2010	2011	2012	2013
2014	2015	2016	2017	2018
2019	2020	2021	2022	2023
2024	2025	2026–		

== Players ==
=== Current squad ===
As of 10 September 2026. Note: Flags indicate national team as defined under FIFA eligibility rules; some limited exceptions apply. Players may hold more than one non-FIFA nationality.

No.	Pos.	Nation	Player
1	GK	GER	Lennart Moser
4	DF	JPN	Ryoya Ogawa ^{DSP}
5	DF	JPN	Shu Ikedo ^{DSP}
6	DF	JPN	Hiroshi Omori
7	MF	JPN	Ryō Takeuchi (captain)
8	MF	JPN	Ataru Esaka (vice-captain)
9	FW	BRA	Léo Gaúcho
10	FW	KOR	Na Sang-ho
13	GK	JPN	Shun Matsuda
14	MF	JPN	Ryo Tabei (vice-captain)
17	MF	JPN	Rui Sueyoshi
18	DF	JPN	Daichi Tagami
19	FW	JPN	Ryoga Sato (on loan from Júbilo Iwata)
20	FW	JPN	Kota Kawano
23	GK	BRA	Kewin
24	MF	JPN	Ibuki Fujita
26	DF	JPN	Haruka Motoyama (on loan from Vissel Kobe)
27	MF	JPN	Takaya Kimura

No.	Pos.	Nation	Player
28	MF	JPN	Masaya Matsumoto
30	FW	JPN	Kanshiro Suemune
31	DF	JPN	Ryo Senda
33	MF	JPN	Yūta Kamiya
40	MF	JPN	Kōsei Ogura ^{DSP}
41	MF	JPN	Eiji Miyamoto
43	DF	JPN	Yoshitake Suzuki
44	DF	JPN	Soichiro Mori (on loan from Nagoya Grampus)
48	DF	JPN	Yūgo Tatsuta
51	DF	JPN	Kosuke Shirai
52	GK	JPN	Taro Hamada
55	DF	JPN	Yōta Fujii
66	MF	JPN	Jun Nishikawa
77	GK	JPN	Goro Kawanami
79	MF	JPN	Noah Kenshin Browne
80	MF	BRA	Oberdan
88	MF	JPN	Towa Yamane
99	FW	BRA	Lucão

=== Out on loan ===
Note: Flags indicate national team as defined under FIFA eligibility rules; some limited exceptions apply. Players may hold more than one non-FIFA nationality.

No.	Pos.	Nation	Player
—	FW	JPN	Ryunosuke Ota (at Júbilo Iwata)
—	MF	JPN	Kaito Fujii (at Iwaki FC)
—	MF	JPN	Yoko Iesaka (at Tegevajaro Miyazaki)

No.	Pos.	Nation	Player
—	MF	JPN	Koju Yoshio (at Kagoshima United)
—	GK	JPN	Kohei Kawakami (at Kagoshima United)
—	FW	JPN	Aura Takahashi (at Kagoshima United)

== Management and staff ==
Club staff for 2025 season

Position	Name
Manager	(Japan) Takashi Kiyama
Assistant manager	(Japan) Masanori Kizawa (Japan) Yuki Kosaka (Japan) Hiromasa Suguri
Goalkeeper coach	(Japan) Hiroshi Yoshioka
Physical coach	(Japan) Jun Sato
Assistant coach	(Japan) Kenji Yamamoto
Chief trainer	(Japan) Takahiro Chiba
Trainer	(Japan) Tetsuya Furuta (Japan) Takuya Tsuji
Interpreter (Portuguese)	(Japan) Fernando Aizawa
Interpreter (English) & Enhancement coach	(Japan) Kosuke Maruyama
Chief manager	(Japan) Atsuki Shimada
General affairs	(Japan) Nao Inamoto (Japan) Fumikazu Sato

== Honours ==
Type	Honours	Titles	Season
League	J2 League Promotion play-off winner	1	2024
League	Okayama Football League 1	3	2001, 2003, 2004
League	Chugoku Football League	2	2006, 2007
League	Japanese Regional Leagues	1	2007

Bold is for those competition that are currently active.

== Records and statistics ==
As of 2 April 2026.

Top 10 all-time appearances
Rank	Player	Years	Club appearance
1	(Japan) Kohei Kiyama	2007–2011, 2017–2023	277
2	(Japan) Kenji Sekido	2012–2022	249
3	(Japan) Tadashi Takeda	2008–2017	241
4	(Japan) Masahiko Sawaguchi	2009–2018	240
5	(Japan) Keita Goto	2010–2014, 2018–2021	215
6	(Japan) Ryo Tadokoro	2009–2015	212
7	(Japan) Hirotsugu Nakabayashi	2012–2016	208
8	(Japan) Makoto Mimura	2011–2021	187
9	(Japan) Takaya Kimura	2021–present	183
10	(Japan) Takanori Chiaki	2010–2015	178

Top 10 all-time goalscorer
Rank	Player	Club appearance	Total goals
1	(Japan) Yuki Oshitani	146	44
3	(Japan) Kohei Kiyama	91	27
3	(South Korea) Lee Yong-jae	277	27
4	(Japan) Hayato Nakama	79	23
5	(Brazil) Tiago Alves	64	22
8	(Japan) Yasutaka Kobayashi	39	20
8	(Japan) Yuta Toyokawa	79	20
8	(Japan) Satoki Uejō	84	20
10	(Japan) Kengo Kawamata	40	18
10	(Japan) Shingo Akamine	155	18

- Biggest wins: 13–0 vs Hitachi Kasado SC (3 June 2007)
- Heaviest defeats: 1–7 vs Ehime FC (12 June 2024)
- Youngest ever debutant: Hikaru Maeda ~ 17 years 7 months 14 days old (On 6 March 2024 vs Tegevajaro Miyazaki)
- Oldest ever player: Akira Kaji ~ 36 years 9 months 1 days old (On 14 October 2017 vs Mito HollyHock)
- Youngest goal scorers: Kaito Abe ~ 18 years 5 months 14 days old (On 4 March 2018 vs Tochigi SC)
- Oldest goal scorers: Akira Kaji ~ 36 years 3 months 3 days old (On 16 April 2025 vs Thespakusatsu Gunma)

== Award winners ==
As of the end of the 2025 season.

J.League Best XI:

J2 League

- (Netherlands) Jordy Buijs (2022)
- (Germany) Svend Brodersen (2024)

== Managerial history ==
League games only

Manager	Nationality	Tenure		Managerial Record				
Manager	Nationality	From	To	P	W	D	L	W%
Satoshi Tezuka	Japan	1 January 2007	31 January 2010	55	12	12	31	21.82
Masanaga Kageyama	Japan	1 February 2010	31 December 2014	200	66	64	70	33.00
Tetsu Nagasawa	Japan	1 February 2015	31 January 2019	168	56	59	53	33.33
Kenji Arima	Japan	1 February 2019	31 January 2022	126	45	39	42	35.71
Takashi Kiyama	Japan	1 February 2022	Current	0	0	0	0	—

Key

- Source: J.League Data Site

== Season by season record ==
Champions	Runners-up	Third place	Promoted	Relegated

League													J. League Cup	Emperor's Cup
Season	Div.	Teams	Pos.	P	W(PKW)	D	L(PKL)	F	A	GD	Pts	Attendance/G	J. League Cup	Emperor's Cup
2005	Chūgoku; League	7	2nd	12	9(0)	0	2(1)	37	13	24	28		Not eligible	Did not qualify
2006	Chūgoku; League	8	1st	14	11(1)	0	2	62	16	46	35		Not eligible	Did not qualify
2007	Chūgoku; League	8	1st	17	17	0	0	87	4	83	51		Not eligible	Did not qualify
2008	JFL	18	4th	34	17	9	8	63	43	20	39	3,665	Not eligible	3rd round
2009	J2	18	18th	51	8	12	31	40	54	-44	60	6,164	Not eligible	2nd round
2010	J2	19	17th	36	8	8	20	27	51	-24	32	7,161	Not eligible	2nd round
2011	J2	20	13th	38	13	9	16	43	58	-15	48	7,258	Not eligible	3rd round
2012	J2	22	8th	42	17	14	11	41	34	7	65	7,985	Not eligible	3rd round
2013	J2	22	12th	42	13	17	12	52	48	4	56	8,574	Not eligible	3rd round
2014	J2	22	8th	42	15	16	11	52	48	4	64	8,404	Not eligible	2nd round
2015	J2	22	11th	42	12	18	12	40	35	5	54	8,412	Not eligible	1st round
2016	J2	22	6th	42	17	14	11	58	44	14	65	10,017	Not eligible	3rd round
2017	J2	22	13th	42	13	16	13	44	49	-5	55	9,471	Not eligible	3rd round
2018	J2	22	15th	42	14	11	17	39	43	-4	53	8,599	Not eligible	2nd round
2019	J2	22	9th	42	18	11	13	49	47	2	65	9,444	Not eligible	3rd round
2020 †	J2	22	17th	42	12	14	16	39	49	-10	50	3,072	Not eligible	Did not qualify
2021 †	J2	22	11th	42	15	14	13	40	36	4	59	4,153	Not eligible	3rd round
2022	J2	22	3rd	42	20	12	10	61	42	19	72	7,065	Not eligible	2nd round
2023	J2	22	10th	42	13	19	10	49	49	0	58	8,495	Not eligible	3rd round
2024	J2	20	5th	38	17	14	7	48	29	19	65	9,188	2nd Round	2nd round
2025	J1	20	13th	38	12	9	17	34	43	-9	45	14,534	1st round	2nd round
2026	J1	10	TBD	18									N/A	N/A
2026-27	J1	20	TBD	38									TBD	TBD

Key

- Pos. = Position in league; P = Games played; W = Games won; D = Games drawn; L = Games lost; F = Goals scored; A = Goals conceded; GD = Goals difference; Pts = Points gained
- Attendance/G = Average league home attendance
- † 2020 & 2021 seasons attendance reduced by COVID-19 worldwide pandemic
- Source: J.League Data Site
