= 1997 Verdy Kawasaki season =

Verdy Kawasaki
1997 season
- Manager: Hisashi Kato; Espinosa; Ryoichi Kawakatsu
- Stadium: Todoroki Athletics Stadium
- J.League: 15th
- Emperor's Cup: 3rd Round
- J.League Cup: GL-B 2nd
- Super Cup: Runners-up
- Asian Cup Winners' Cup: Quarterfinals
- Top goalscorer: Alcindo (10)
Home colours	Away colours

1997 Verdy Kawasaki season

== Competitions ==
Competitions	Position
J.League	15th / 17 clubs
Emperor's Cup	3rd round
J.League Cup	GL-B 2nd / 4 clubs
Super Cup	Runners-up
Asian Cup Winners' Cup	Quarterfinals

== Domestic results ==
=== J.League ===
12 April 1997 1-1	Verdy Kawasaki	0-2	JEF United Ichihara	Todoroki Athletics Stadium
JST (UTC+09)

16 April 1997 1-2	Bellmare Hiratsuka	0-2	Verdy Kawasaki	Hiratsuka Athletics Stadium
JST (UTC+09)

19 April 1997 1-3	Verdy Kawasaki	2-2 (GG) (a.e.t.) (3-4 p)	Yokohama Marinos	Todoroki Athletics Stadium
JST (UTC+09)

23 April 1997 1-4	Shimizu S-Pulse	2-1 (GG) (a.e.t.)	Verdy Kawasaki	Nihondaira Sports Stadium
JST (UTC+09)

26 April 1997 1-5	Verdy Kawasaki	1-2	Sanfrecce Hiroshima	Todoroki Athletics Stadium
JST (UTC+09)

3 May 1997 1-6	Avispa Fukuoka	1-2 (GG) (a.e.t.)	Verdy Kawasaki	Hakatanomori Football Stadium
JST (UTC+09)

7 May 1997 1-7	Verdy Kawasaki	0-2	Cerezo Osaka	Todoroki Athletics Stadium
JST (UTC+09)

10 May 1997 1-8	Vissel Kobe	2-4	Verdy Kawasaki	Kobe Universiade Memorial Stadium
JST (UTC+09)

17 May 1997 1-9	Verdy Kawasaki	1-1 (GG) (a.e.t.) (2-3 p)	Kashima Antlers	Tokyo National Stadium
JST (UTC+09)

24 May 1997 1-10	Nagoya Grampus Eight	1-0	Verdy Kawasaki	Gifu Nagaragawa Stadium
JST (UTC+09)

28 May 1997 1-11	Verdy Kawasaki	0-4	Yokohama Flügels	Todoroki Athletics Stadium
JST (UTC+09)

31 May 1997 1-12	Júbilo Iwata	0-1 (GG) (a.e.t.)	Verdy Kawasaki	Júbilo Iwata Stadium
JST (UTC+09)

5 July 1997 1-13	Verdy Kawasaki	1-3	Kashiwa Reysol	Todoroki Athletics Stadium
JST (UTC+09)

9 July 1997 1-14	Urawa Red Diamonds	2-0	Verdy Kawasaki	Urawa Komaba Stadium
JST (UTC+09)

12 July 1997 1-15	Verdy Kawasaki	0-1	Gamba Osaka	Todoroki Athletics Stadium
JST (UTC+09)

1-16	bye

19 July 1997 1-17	Kyoto Purple Sanga	2-1	Verdy Kawasaki	Nishikyogoku Athletic Stadium
JST (UTC+09)

2-1	bye

2 August 1997 2-2	JEF United Ichihara	3-1	Verdy Kawasaki	Ichihara Seaside Stadium
JST (UTC+09)

6 August 1997 2-3	Verdy Kawasaki	1-2	Bellmare Hiratsuka	Todoroki Athletics Stadium
JST (UTC+09)

9 August 1997 2-4	Yokohama Marinos	7-2	Verdy Kawasaki	Yamagata Park Stadium
JST (UTC+09)

16 August 1997 2-5	Verdy Kawasaki	1-0 (GG) (a.e.t.)	Shimizu S-Pulse	Todoroki Athletics Stadium
JST (UTC+09)

20 August 1997 2-6	Sanfrecce Hiroshima	3-1	Verdy Kawasaki	Hiroshima Big Arch
JST (UTC+09)

23 August 1997 2-7	Verdy Kawasaki	2-0	Avispa Fukuoka	Todoroki Athletics Stadium
JST (UTC+09)

30 August 1997 2-8	Cerezo Osaka	5-3	Verdy Kawasaki	Osaka Nagai Stadium
JST (UTC+09)

3 September 1997 2-9	Verdy Kawasaki	2-0	Vissel Kobe	Todoroki Athletics Stadium
JST (UTC+09)

6 September 1997 2-10	Kashima Antlers	5-0	Verdy Kawasaki	Kashima Soccer Stadium
JST (UTC+09)

10 September 1997 2-11	Gamba Osaka	2-1	Verdy Kawasaki	Osaka Expo '70 Stadium
JST (UTC+09)

13 September 1997 2-12	Verdy Kawasaki	2-0	Nagoya Grampus Eight	Sapporo Atsubetsu Park Stadium
JST (UTC+09)

20 September 1997 2-13	Verdy Kawasaki	1-6	Júbilo Iwata	Niigata City Athletic Stadium
JST (UTC+09)

24 September 1997 2-14	Yokohama Flügels	0-1	Verdy Kawasaki	Tokyo National Stadium
JST (UTC+09)

27 September 1997 2-15	Kashiwa Reysol	2-1	Verdy Kawasaki	Hitachi Kashiwa Soccer Stadium
JST (UTC+09)

1 October 1997 2-16	Verdy Kawasaki	1-2	Urawa Red Diamonds	Tokyo National Stadium
JST (UTC+09)

4 October 1997 2-17	Verdy Kawasaki	2-1 (GG) (a.e.t.)	Kyoto Purple Sanga	Todoroki Athletics Stadium
JST (UTC+09)

=== Emperor's Cup ===
1st Round	bye

7 December 1997 2nd Round	Verdy Kawasaki	2-0	Mitsubishi Heavy Industries Nagasaki	Kimiidera Athletic Stadium
JST (UTC+09)

14 December 1997 3rd Round	Verdy Kawasaki	0-2	Avispa Fukuoka	Todoroki Athletics Stadium
JST (UTC+09)

=== J.League Cup ===
8 March 1997 GL-B-1	Verdy Kawasaki	1-1	Yokohama Marinos	Tokyo National Stadium
JST (UTC+09)

15 March 1997 GL-B-2	Consadole Sapporo	2-2	Verdy Kawasaki	Nagasaki Athletic Stadium
JST (UTC+09)

19 March 1997 GL-B-3	Verdy Kawasaki	1-2	Gamba Osaka	Todoroki Athletics Stadium
JST (UTC+09)

22 March 1997 GL-B-4	Verdy Kawasaki	2-2	Consadole Sapporo	Todoroki Athletics Stadium
JST (UTC+09)

26 March 1997 GL-B-5	Gamba Osaka	0-1	Verdy Kawasaki	Osaka Expo '70 Stadium
JST (UTC+09)

29 March 1997 GL-B-6	Yokohama Marinos	1-2	Verdy Kawasaki	Yokohama Mitsuzawa Stadium
JST (UTC+09)

=== Super Cup ===
5 April 1997	Kashima Antlers	3-2	Verdy Kawasaki	Tokyo National Stadium
	Mazinho ?'; Yanagisawa ?', ?'		Hashiratani ?'; Magrão ?'	Attendance: 28,920

== International results ==
=== Asian Cup Winners' Cup ===
1st Round	bye

19 October 1997 2nd Round-1	(Japan) Verdy Kawasaki	5-2	(India) East Bengal	Naraha, Fukushima, Japan
	Sugawara ?'; Alcindo ?', ?', ?'; Y. Miura ?'		Bhaichung Bhutia ?'; Bhaichung Bhutia ?'	Stadium: J-Village Stadium; Attendance: 2,136

8 November 1997 2nd Round-2	(India) East Bengal	1-0 (5-3 agg.)	(Japan) Verdy Kawasaki	Calcutta, India
	Samuel Omelo ?'			Attendance: 30,000

3 December 1997 Quarterfinals-1	(Japan) Verdy Kawasaki	0-2	(China) Beijing Guoan	Kawasaki, Japan
			? ?' ? ?'	Stadium: Todoroki Athletics Stadium; Attendance: 2,460

11 December 1997 Quarterfinals-2	(China) Beijing Guoan	1-0 (3-0 agg.)	(Japan) Verdy Kawasaki	Beijing, China PR
	? ?'			Attendance: 30,000

== Player statistics ==
No.	Pos.	Nat.	Player	D.o.B. (Age)	Height / Weight	J.League		Emperor's Cup		J.League Cup		Super Cup		Dom. Total		Asian Cup Winners' Cup	
No.	Pos.	Nat.	Player	D.o.B. (Age)	Height / Weight	Apps	Goals	Apps	Goals	Apps	Goals	Apps	Goals	Apps	Goals	Apps	Goals
1	GK	(Japan)	Shinkichi Kikuchi	April 12, 1967 (aged 29)	182 cm / 80 kg	11	0	2	0	6	0	1	0	20	0		0
2	DF	(Japan)	Ko Ishikawa	March 10, 1970 (aged 26)	170 cm / 64 kg	26	0	2	0	6	0	1	0	35	0		0
3	DF	(Brazil)	Argel	September 4, 1974 (aged 22)	181 cm / 75 kg	18	0	0	0	5	0	0	0	23	0		0
4	DF	(Japan)	Kentaro Hayashi	August 29, 1972 (aged 24)	181 cm / 73 kg	9	0	2	0	5	1	0	0	16	1		0
5	DF	(Japan)	Tetsuji Hashiratani	July 15, 1964 (aged 32)	182 cm / 70 kg	16	0	2	0	3	0	1	1	22	1		0
6	DF	(Japan)	Tadashi Nakamura	June 10, 1971 (aged 25)	175 cm / 71 kg	15	0	2	0	0	0	1	0	18	0		0
7	MF	(Japan)	Masakiyo Maezono	October 29, 1973 (aged 23)	170 cm / 63 kg	28	5	2	0	0	0	1	0	31	5		0
8	MF	(Japan)	Tsuyoshi Kitazawa	August 10, 1968 (aged 28)	170 cm / 68 kg	29	1	2	0	0	0	1	0	32	1		0
9	FW	(Japan)	Keisuke Kurihara	May 20, 1973 (aged 23)	172 cm / 62 kg	7	0	0	0	6	1	0	0	13	1		0
10	MF	(Japan)	Keiji Ishizuka	August 26, 1974 (aged 22)	184 cm / 77 kg	7	1	0	0	5	1	0	0	12	2		0
11	FW	(Japan)	Kazuyoshi Miura	February 26, 1967 (aged 30)	177 cm / 72 kg	14	4	2	1	0	0	1	0	17	5		0
12	MF	(Japan)	Hideki Nagai	January 26, 1971 (aged 26)	175 cm / 70 kg	19	2	1	0	5	2	1	0	26	4		0
13	FW		Shintetsu Gen	August 6, 1973 (aged 23)	185 cm / 72 kg	8	2	0	0	0	0	0	0	8	2		0
14	DF	(Japan)	Yuji Hironaga	July 25, 1975 (aged 21)	181 cm / 72 kg	18	0	1	0	5	0	1	0	25	0		0
15	MF	(Japan)	Yasutoshi Miura	July 15, 1965 (aged 31)	171 cm / 67 kg	21	0	1	0	5	0	0	0	27	0		1
16	DF	(Japan)	Toshimi Kikuchi	June 17, 1973 (aged 23)	177 cm / 70 kg	1	0	0	0	3	0	0	0	4	0		0
17	DF	(Japan)	Hiroyuki Shirai	June 17, 1974 (aged 22)	180 cm / 71 kg	17	0	1	0	2	0	1	0	21	0		0
18	DF	(Japan)	Tomo Sugawara	June 3, 1976 (aged 20)	175 cm / 69 kg	20	0	1	0	3	0	0	0	24	0		1
19	GK	(Japan)	Kiyomitsu Kobari	June 12, 1977 (aged 19)	181 cm / 71 kg	2	0	0	0	0	0	0	0	2	0		0
20	MF	(Japan)	Shigetoshi Hasebe	April 23, 1971 (aged 25)	173 cm / 68 kg	7	0	0	0	6	2	0	0	13	2		0
21	FW	(Japan)	Nobuhiro Takeda	May 10, 1967 (aged 29)	177 cm / 70 kg	4	0	0	0	6	1	1	0	11	1		0
22	FW	(Brazil)	Magrão	February 21, 1974 (aged 23)	192 cm / 81 kg	9	6	0	0	4	0	1	1	14	7		0
23	FW	(Japan)	Yoshinori Abe	September 10, 1972 (aged 24)	177 cm / 70 kg	11	1	0	0	0	0	0	0	11	1		0
24	FW	(Japan)	Takanori Nunobe	September 23, 1973 (aged 23)	177 cm / 71 kg	0	0		0	0	0	0	0		0		0
25	DF	(Japan)	Takuya Yamada	August 24, 1974 (aged 22)	176 cm / 72 kg	22	1	0	0	3	0	1	0	26	1		0
26	GK	(Japan)	Takaya Oishi	July 7, 1972 (aged 24)	181 cm / 76 kg	9	0	0	0	0	0	1	0	10	0		0
27	GK	(Japan)	Nobuhiro Maeda	June 3, 1973 (aged 23)	187 cm / 80 kg	0	0		0	0	0	0	0		0		0
28	MF	(Japan)	Junichi Watanabe	May 20, 1973 (aged 23)	167 cm / 58 kg	12	1	0	0	4	1	0	0	16	2		0
29	DF	(Japan)	Megumu Yoshida	April 13, 1973 (aged 23)	176 cm / 68 kg	0	0		0	0	0	0	0		0		0
30	FW	(Japan)	Michiyasu Osada	March 5, 1978 (aged 19)	174 cm / 67 kg	5	0	0	0	0	0	0	0	5	0		0
31	MF	(Japan)	Shingi Ono	April 9, 1974 (aged 22)	178 cm / 71 kg	0	0		0	0	0	0	0		0		0
32	FW	(Japan)	Mitsunori Yabuta	May 2, 1976 (aged 20)	175 cm / 62 kg	2	0	0	0	0	0	0	0	2	0		0
33	MF	(Japan)	Masakazu Senuma	September 7, 1978 (aged 18)	178 cm / 69 kg	0	0		0	0	0	0	0		0		0
34	MF	(Japan)	Taro Ichiki	September 1, 1976 (aged 20)	171 cm / 68 kg	0	0		0	0	0	0	0		0		0
35	DF	(Japan)	Yukinori Shigeta	July 15, 1976 (aged 20)	166 cm / 59 kg	3	0	0	0	0	0	0	0	3	0		0
36	FW	(Japan)	Hiroaki Tanaka	April 17, 1979 (aged 17)	175 cm / 68 kg	0	0		0	0	0	0	0		0		0
37	FW	(Japan)	Yusuke Aida	April 18, 1979 (aged 17)	168 cm / 62 kg	0	0		0	0	0	0	0		0		0
38	MF	(Japan)	Toshiki Kushima	April 22, 1979 (aged 17)	177 cm / 62 kg	0	0		0	0	0	0	0		0		0
39	MF	(Japan)	Kenji Kageyama	April 2, 1980 (aged 16)	176 cm / 69 kg	0	0		0	0	0	0	0		0		0
40	DF	(Japan)	Kazuya Iio	April 10, 1980 (aged 16)	176 cm / 68 kg	0	0		0	0	0	0	0		0		0
41	DF	(Japan)	Yukio Tsuchiya	July 31, 1974 (aged 22)	175 cm / 69 kg	4	0	0	0	0	0	0	0	4	0		0
16	GK	(Japan)	Kenji Honnami †	June 23, 1964 (aged 32)	186 cm / 80 kg	11	0	0	0	0	0	0	0	11	0		0
21	FW	(Brazil)	Alcindo †	October 21, 1967 (aged 29)	cm / kg	16	10	0	0	0	0	0	0	16	10		3
24	MF	(Brazil)	Dias †	May 5, 1967 (aged 29)	cm / kg	10	3	0	0	0	0	0	0	10	3		0
10	MF	(Japan)	Ruy Ramos †	February 9, 1957 (aged 40)	cm / kg	10	0	2	0	0	0	0	0	12	0		0
42	MF	(Japan)	Nobuyuki Zaizen †	October 19, 1976 (aged 20)	cm / kg	0	0		0	0	0	0	0		0		0

- † player(s) joined the team after the opening of this season.

== Transfers ==
In:

No.	Pos.	Nation	Player
17	DF	JPN	Hiroyuki Shirai (from Shimizu S-Pulse)
25	DF	JPN	Takuya Yamada (from Komazawa University)
40	DF	JPN	Kazuya Iio (Verdy Kawasaki youth)
41	DF	JPN	Yukio Tsuchiya (from Internacional Bebedouro)
7	MF	JPN	Masakiyo Maezono (from Yokohama Flügels)
12	MF	JPN	Hideki Nagai (from Shimizu S-Pulse)
31	MF	JPN	Shingi Ono (loan return from Denso)
33	MF	JPN	Masakazu Senuma (from Verdy Kawasaki youth)
38	MF	JPN	Toshiki Kushima (Verdy Kawasaki youth)
39	MF	JPN	Kenji Kageyama (Verdy Kawasaki youth)
21	FW	JPN	Nobuhiro Takeda (from Júbilo Iwata)
23	FW	JPN	Yoshinori Abe (from Sagan Tosu)
36	FW	JPN	Hiroaki Tanaka (Verdy Kawasaki youth)
37	FW	JPN	Yusuke Aida (Verdy Kawasaki youth)

Out:

No.	Pos.	Nation	Player
—	GK	JPN	Kazuma Ito
—	DF	JPN	Kenichiro Tokura (to Kawasaki Frontale)
—	DF	JPN	Junji Nishizawa (to Shimizu S-Pulse)
—	DF	JPN	Tomohiro Katayama
—	MF	JPN	Shiro Kikuhara (retired)
—	MF	BRA	Bismarck (to Kashima Antlers)
—	FW	JPN	Takashi Ujiie (to Sagan Tosu)
—	FW	JPN	Kei Hoshikawa

== Transfers during the season ==
=== In ===
- (Japan) Kenji Honnami (from Gamba Osaka)
- (Brazil) Carlos Alberto Costa Dias (on June)
- (Brazil) Alcindo Sartori (on August)
- (Japan) Ruy Ramos (from Kyoto Purple Sanga)
- (Japan) Nobuyuki Zaizen (return)

=== Out ===
- (Japan) Toshimi Kikuchi (to Gamba Osaka)
- (Japan) Takanori Nunobe (to Júbilo Iwata)
- (Japan) Nobuhiro Takeda (to JEF United Ichihara)
- (Japan) Keiji Ishizuka (to Consadole Sapporo)
- (Japan) Shigetoshi Hasebe (to Kawasaki Frontale)

== Awards ==
none

== Other pages ==
- (in Japanese) J. League official site
- (in Japanese) Tokyo Verdy official site
