= Keiji Ishizuka =

Japanese footballer

Keiji Ishizuka 石塚 啓次
Personal information
- Full name: Keiji Ishizuka
- Date of birth: August 26, 1974 (age 52)
- Place of birth: Kyoto, Japan
- Height: 1.84 m (6 ft 1/2 in)
- Position: Forward

Youth career
- 1990–1992: Yamashiro High School

Senior career*
| Years | Team | Apps | (Gls) |
| 1993–2002 | Tokyo Verdy | 103 | (15) |
| 1997 | →Consadole Sapporo (loan) | 10 | (2) |
| 2003 | Kawasaki Frontale | 0 | (0) |
| 2003 | Nagoya Grampus Eight | 3 | (0) |
| Total | | 116 | (17) |
Medal record
Tokyo Verdy
| Winner | J1 League | 1993 |
| Winner | J1 League | 1994 |
| Runner-up | J1 League | 1995 |
| Winner | J.League Cup | 1993 |
| Winner | J.League Cup | 1994 |
| Runner-up | J.League Cup | 1996 |
| Winner | Emperor's Cup | 1996 |
- * Club domestic league appearances and goals

Keiji Ishizuka (石塚 啓次, Ishizuka Keiji; born August 26, 1974) is a former Japanese football player.

== Playing career ==
Ishizuka was born in Kyoto Prefecture on August 26, 1974. After graduating from high school, he joined Verdy Kawasaki (later Tokyo Verdy) in 1993. Although he played as an offensive midfielder, he did not become a regular player like Ruy Ramos, Tsuyoshi Kitazawa, Bismarck, and others. In August 1997, he moved to the Japan Football League club Consadole Sapporo on loan and played in many matches. In 1998, he returned to Verdy Kawasaki. Starting in 1999, he played often as forward. However he did not play as much 2002 and he moved to the J2 League club Kawasaki Frontale. However he did not play much, and moved to Nagoya Grampus Eight in September. He did not play much there either, and retired at the end of the 2003 season.

== Career statistics ==
Appearances and goals by club, season and competition
| Club | Season | League | | | Emperor's Cup | | J.League Cup | | Total | |
| Club | Season | Division | Apps | Goals | Apps | Goals | Apps | Goals | Apps | Goals |
|---|---|---|---|---|---|---|---|---|---|---|
| Verdy Kawasaki | 1993 | J1 League | 0 | 0 | 0 | 0 | 1 | 0 | 1 | 0 |
| Verdy Kawasaki | 1994 | J1 League | 7 | 1 | 2 | 1 | 0 | 0 | 9 | 2 |
| Verdy Kawasaki | 1995 | J1 League | 15 | 0 | 2 | 0 | — | | 17 | 0 |
| Verdy Kawasaki | 1996 | J1 League | 0 | 0 | 1 | 0 | 2 | 1 | 3 | 1 |
| Verdy Kawasaki | 1997 | J1 League | 7 | 1 | 0 | 0 | 5 | 1 | 12 | 2 |
| Consadole Sapporo | 1997 | Football League | 10 | 2 | 3 | 1 | 2 | 0 | 15 | 3 |
| Verdy Kawasaki | 1998 | J1 League | 10 | 1 | 0 | 0 | 0 | 0 | 10 | 1 |
| Verdy Kawasaki | 1999 | J1 League | 17 | 3 | 4 | 2 | 1 | 0 | 22 | 5 |
| Verdy Kawasaki | 2000 | J1 League | 29 | 6 | 2 | 1 | 6 | 0 | 37 | 7 |
| Tokyo Verdy | 2001 | J1 League | 13 | 3 | 3 | 0 | 1 | 0 | 17 | 3 |
| Tokyo Verdy | 2002 | J1 League | 5 | 0 | 0 | 0 | 0 | 0 | 5 | 0 |
| Kawasaki Frontale | 2003 | J2 League | 0 | 0 | 0 | 0 | — | | 0 | 0 |
| Nagoya Grampus Eight | 2003 | J1 League | 3 | 0 | 0 | 0 | 0 | 0 | 3 | 0 |
| Career total | | | 116 | 17 | 17 | 5 | 18 | 2 | 151 | 24 |
