= Takanori Nunobe =

Japanese footballer and manager

Takanori Nunobe 布部 陽功
Personal information
- Full name: Takanori Nunobe
- Date of birth: September 23, 1973 (age 53)
- Place of birth: Takatsuki, Osaka, Japan
- Height: 1.77 m (5 ft 10 in)
- Position: Midfielder

Youth career
- 1989–1991: Hokuyo High School
- 1992–1993: Kindai University

Senior career*
Years	Team	Apps	(Gls)
1995–1997	Verdy Kawasaki	11	(0)
1997	Júbilo Iwata	11	(2)
1998–2001	Vissel Kobe	105	(11)
2001–2005	Cerezo Osaka	119	(4)
2006–2008	Avispa Fukuoka	98	(11)
Total		344	(28)

Managerial career
- 2017–2018: Kyoto Sanga FC
Medal record
Verdy Kawasaki
Runner-up	J1 League	1995
Runner-up	J.League Cup	1996
Winner	Emperor's Cup	1996
Júbilo Iwata
Winner	J1 League	1997
Runner-up	J.League Cup	1997
Cerezo Osaka
Runner-up	Emperor's Cup	2001
Runner-up	Emperor's Cup	2003
- * Club domestic league appearances and goals

Takanori Nunobe (布部 陽功, Nunobe Takanori; born September 23, 1973) is a former Japanese football player and manager.

== Playing career ==
Nunobe was born in Takatsuki on September 23, 1973. After dropped out from Kindai University in 1993, he joined Verdy Kawasaki in 1995. He played as forward from first season and the club won the champions 1996 Emperor's Cup. However he could hardly play in the match in 1997 and he moved to Júbilo Iwata. He played many matches as substitutes and the club won the champions J1 League. In 1998, he moved to Vissel Kobe. He became a regular player as right midfielder and right side back. In 2001, he moved to his local club Cerezo Osaka. Although the club won the 2nd place 2001 Emperor's Cup, was relegated to J2 League from 2002. From 2002, he became a regular player as defensive midfielder and the club returned to J1 League in a year. In 2003, the club won the 2nd place Emperor's Cup. In 2006, he moved to Avispa Fukuoka. Although he played many matches as defensive midfielder, the club was relegated to J2 from 2007. From 2007, he played as regular player and retired end of 2008 season.

== Coaching career ==
After retirement, Nunobe started coaching career at Avispa Fukuoka in 2009. In 2010, he moved to Kashiwa Reysol and served as a coach until 2016. In 2017, he moved to J2 League club Kyoto Sanga FC and became a manager. However the club results were bad in 2018 and he was sacked in May when the club was at 21st place of 22 clubs.

== Club statistics ==
Club performance			League		Cup		League Cup		Total	
Season	Club	League	Apps	Goals	Apps	Goals	Apps	Goals	Apps	Goals
Japan			League		Emperor's Cup		J.League Cup		Total	
1995	Verdy Kawasaki	J1 League	3	0	0	0	-		3	0
1996	Verdy Kawasaki	J1 League	8	0	2	0	11	5	21	5
1997	Verdy Kawasaki	J1 League	0	0	0	0	0	0	0	0
1997	Júbilo Iwata	J1 League	11	2	2	0	4	0	17	2
1998	Vissel Kobe	J1 League	31	2	2	1	4	0	37	3
1999	Vissel Kobe	J1 League	29	2	1	0	2	1	32	3
2000	Vissel Kobe	J1 League	30	6	4	0	4	2	38	8
2001	Vissel Kobe	J1 League	15	1	0	0	4	2	19	3
2001	Cerezo Osaka	J1 League	7	0	1	0	0	0	8	0
2002	Cerezo Osaka	J2 League	34	0	4	0	-		38	0
2003	Cerezo Osaka	J1 League	26	3	5	0	4	1	35	4
2004	Cerezo Osaka	J1 League	28	0	1	0	5	0	34	0
2005	Cerezo Osaka	J1 League	24	1	2	0	7	0	33	1
2006	Avispa Fukuoka	J1 League	22	3	0	0	4	0	26	3
2007	Avispa Fukuoka	J2 League	44	7	2	0	-		46	7
2008	Avispa Fukuoka	J2 League	32	1	1	0	-		33	1
Total			344	28	27	1	49	11	420	40

== Managerial statistics ==
Team	From	To	Record				
Team	From	To	G	W	D	L	Win %
Kyoto Sanga FC	2017	2018	55	16	18	21	29.09
Total			55	16	18	21	29.09
