= 1996 Verdy Kawasaki season =

Verdy Kawasaki
1996 season
- Manager: (Brazil) Nelsinho; (Japan) Yasuyuki Kishino (coach, May 1996); (Brazil) Émerson Leão (10 May 1996)
- Stadium: Kawasaki Todoroki Stadium
- J.League: 7th
- Emperor's Cup: Champions
- J.League Cup: Runners-up
- Suntory Cup: Semifinals
- Top goalscorer: League: Kazuyoshi Miura (23); All: Kazuyoshi Miura (30)
- Highest home attendance: 21,074 (vs Kashima Antlers, 9 November 1996); 45,555 (vs Urawa Red Diamonds, 13 April 1996, Tokyo National Stadium)
- Lowest home attendance: 10,021 (vs JEF United Ichihara, 1 May 1996)
- Average home league attendance: 17,653
Home colours	Away colours

1996 Verdy Kawasaki season

== Review and events ==
=== League results summary ===
Overall								Home						Away					
Pld	W	D	L	GF	GA	GD	Pts	W	D	L	GF	GA	GD	W	D	L	GF	GA	GD
30	19	0	11	68	42	+26	57	10	0	5	34	20	+14	9	0	6	34	22	+12

Source: J.LEAGUE OFFICIAL GUIDE 1997. ISBN 4-09-102329-0.

=== League results by round ===
Round	1	2	3	4	5	6	7	8	9	10	11	12	13	14	15	16	17	18	19	20	21	22	23	24	25	26	27	28	29	30
Ground	H	A	H	A	H	A	H	A	H	A	H	H	A	H	A	A	H	A	H	A	H	A	H	A	H	A	H	A	A	H
Result	W	W	L	W	W	L	W	L	L	L	W	L	L	W	W	W	W	W	W	L	W	W	L	W	L	L	W	W	W	W
Position	7	1	6	6	5	6	5	6	6	6	6	7	7	7	7	7	7	7	7	7	7	7	7	7	7	7	7	7	7	7

Source: J.LEAGUE OFFICIAL GUIDE 1997. ISBN 4-09-102329-0.
A = Away; H = Home; W = Win; D = Draw; L = Loss

== Competitions ==
Competitions	Position
J.League	7th / 16 clubs
Emperor's Cup	Champions
J.League Cup	Runners-up
Suntory Cup	Semifinals

== Domestic results ==
=== J.League ===
16 March 1996 1	Verdy Kawasaki	1–0	Kyoto Purple Sanga	Kawasaki Todoroki Stadium
14:03 JST (UTC+09)	K. Miura 34'	J. League		Attendance: 12,835; Referee: Yoshimi Ogawa; Assistant referees: Tetsu Karakida, Ichirō Inukai; Fourth official: Mitsune Yamaguchi

20 March 1996 2	Bellmare Hiratsuka	0–4	Verdy Kawasaki	Hiratsuka Stadium
15:00 JST (UTC+09)		J. League	K. Miura 8'; Donizete 60', 69'; Kitazawa 68'	Attendance: 12,716; Referee: Kiyoshi Ōta; Assistant referees: Satoru Ishizawa, Takuji Fukazawa; Fourth official: Ryū Tetsusashi

23 March 1996 3	Verdy Kawasaki	2–3 (V-goal) (a.e.t.)	Kashiwa Reysol	Kawasaki Todoroki Stadium
15:03 JST (UTC+09)	11' (o.g.); Bismarck 60'	J. League	Edílson 25'; N. Katō 73'; Yokoyama 94'	Attendance: 11,599; Referee: Tetsuya Hamana; Assistant referees: Kazuya Yanagisawa, Tetsu Karakida; Fourth official: Yasuhiko Koiso

30 March 1996 4	Avispa Fukuoka	1–2 (V-goal) (a.e.t.)	Verdy Kawasaki	Hakatanomori Football Stadium
19:00 JST (UTC+09)	Troglio 89'	J. League	Kitazawa 30'; K. Miura 94'	Attendance: 16,328; Referee: Hiroshi Tanabe; Assistant referees: Morihisa Yamaguchi, Hideaki Harada; Fourth official: Ryōichi Imamura

3 April 1996 5	Verdy Kawasaki	3–2 (V-goal) (a.e.t.)	Yokohama Marinos	Tokyo National Stadium
19:00 JST (UTC+09)	Hashiratani 18'; K. Miura 86'; Bismarck 90'	J. League	T. Yamada 43'; T. Suzuki 88'	Attendance: 35,518; Referee: Hideo Kikuchi; Assistant referees: Toshimitsu Yoshida, Akihisa Makino; Fourth official: Tsutomu Anazawa

6 April 1996 6	Júbilo Iwata	2–1	Verdy Kawasaki	Júbilo Iwata Stadium
15:02 JST (UTC+09)	37' (o.g.); Schillaci 68'	J. League	K. Miura 35'	Attendance: 16,381; Referee: Kiyoshi Ōta; Assistant referees: Kimio Izaki, Takao Onshi; Fourth official: Toshiaki Futamata

13 April 1996 7	Verdy Kawasaki	2–0	Urawa Red Diamonds	Tokyo National Stadium
15:03 JST (UTC+09)	Hayashi 70'; K. Miura 83' (pen.)	J. League		Attendance: 45,555; Referee: Naotsugu Fuse; Assistant referees: Takashi Kunori, Susumu Takeda; Fourth official: Noritake Sakurada

17 April 1996 8	Nagoya Grampus Eight	3–1	Verdy Kawasaki	Nagoya Mizuho Athletics Stadium
19:04 JST (UTC+09)	Okayama 2'; Olivier 21'; Stojković 54'	J. League	56' (o.g.)	Attendance: 22,613; Referee: Kazuo Kakihana; Assistant referees: Morihisa Yamaguchi, Satoru Ishizawa; Fourth official: Yūki Noda

20 April 1996 9	Verdy Kawasaki	2–3	Gamba Osaka	Kawasaki Todoroki Stadium
19:01 JST (UTC+09)	K. Miura 40'; 43' (o.g.)	J. League	Hiraoka 59'; Morishita 77'; Matsunami 87'	Attendance: 10,858; Referee: Archundia; Assistant referees: Hiroshi Fukuda, Hisaharu Kitamura; Fourth official: Kenji Ōgiya

27 April 1996 10	Kashima Antlers	2–1	Verdy Kawasaki	Kashima Soccer Stadium
14:33 JST (UTC+09)	Masuda 67'; Hasegawa 75'	J. League	40' (o.g.)	Attendance: 15,702; Referee: Tetsuya Hamana; Assistant referees: Kazuya Yanagisawa, Kō Ōishi; Fourth official: Atsushi Fujigasaki

1 May 1996 11	Verdy Kawasaki	2–1 (V-goal) (a.e.t.)	JEF United Ichihara	Kawasaki Todoroki Stadium
19:00 JST (UTC+09)	Donizete 52'; Sugawara 100'	J. League	Sandro 84'	Attendance: 10,021; Referee: Tatsumi Ōno; Assistant referees: Kōji Taniuchi, Akihisa Makino; Fourth official: Toshiya Kumagai

4 May 1996 12	Verdy Kawasaki	1–2 (V-goal) (a.e.t.)	Cerezo Osaka	Kawasaki Todoroki Stadium
15:00 JST (UTC+09)	Kurihara 89'	J. League	Marquinhos 82' 109'	Attendance: 15,298; Referee: Hiroshi Tanabe; Assistant referees: Kenichi Koshiyama, Masaaki Shimomura; Fourth official: Kazuo Shirato

11 May 1996 13	Yokohama Flügels	4–3 (V-goal) (a.e.t.)	Verdy Kawasaki	Yokohama Mitsuzawa Football Stadium
15:02 JST (UTC+09)	Zinho 3'; Evair 23', 76'; Yamaguchi 101'	J. League	Donizete 10', 77'; Hashiratani 74'	Attendance: 14,329; Referee: Masayoshi Okada; Assistant referees: Tetsuya Hamana, Yoshikazu Hiroshima; Fourth official: Jōji Kashihara

15 May 1996 14	Verdy Kawasaki	5–3	Shimizu S-Pulse	Kawasaki Todoroki Stadium
19:00 JST (UTC+09)	9' (o.g.); Caíco 24'; K. Miura 36', 46'; Kitazawa 69'	J. League	Saitō 42'; 57' (o.g.); Hasegawa 67'	Attendance: 12,016; Referee: Yoshimi Ogawa; Assistant referees: Mitsuru Satō, Kimio Izaki; Fourth official: Kenji Ōgiya

18 May 1996 15	Sanfrecce Hiroshima	1–3	Verdy Kawasaki	Hiroshima Big Arch
15:02 JST (UTC+09)	Takagi 89'	J. League	Donizete 1'; Gen 31'; K. Miura 32'	Attendance: 12,124; Referee: Archundia; Assistant referees: Noboru Ishiyama, Satoru Kawano; Fourth official: Norio Kuriyama

28 August 1996 16	Cerezo Osaka	2–4	Verdy Kawasaki	Osaka Nagai Stadium
19:01 JST (UTC+09)	Morishima 54', 77'	J. League	Magrão 39', 89'; Y. Miura 50'; Bismarck 89'	Attendance: 13,069; Referee: Kazuo Kakihana; Assistant referees: Kazuya Yanagisawa, Kazuhiko Matsumura; Fourth official: Tamotsu Ōnishi

31 August 1996 17	Verdy Kawasaki	3–2	Yokohama Flügels	Sapporo Atsubetsu Stadium
15:04 JST (UTC+09)	Magrão 76'; Gen 88'; Kitazawa 89'	J. League	Evair 16'; Sampaio 66'	Attendance: 14,280; Referee: Lim Kee Chong; Assistant referees: Noboru Ishiyama, Mitsuru Satō; Fourth official: Eiji Kaneda

7 September 1996 18	Shimizu S-Pulse	0–2	Verdy Kawasaki	Nihondaira Sports Stadium
16:04 JST (UTC+09)		J. League	K. Miura 30'; Magrão 34'	Attendance: 15,814; Referee: Zoran Petrović; Assistant referees: Takashi Kunori, Toshiyuki Mayuzumi; Fourth official: Toshiyuki Asanuma

14 September 1996 19	Verdy Kawasaki	5–1	Sanfrecce Hiroshima	Tecnoport Fukui Stadium
18:00 JST (UTC+09)	1' (o.g.); K. Miura 15', 34'; Magrão 46', 75'	J. League	Noh 32'	Attendance: 11,782; Referee: Hiroyuki Umemoto; Assistant referees: Naoki Esumi, Hitoshi Nakagomi; Fourth official: Masao Nakajō

21 September 1996 20	Kyoto Purple Sanga	2–0	Verdy Kawasaki	Kyoto Nishikyogoku Stadium
19:04 JST (UTC+09)	Ta. Yamaguchi 12'; Fujiyoshi 77'	J. League		Attendance: 18,058; Referee: Zoran Petrović; Assistant referees: Morihisa Yamaguchi, Takashi Aoki; Fourth official: Hiroyuki Ishida

28 September 1996 21	Verdy Kawasaki	1–0	Bellmare Hiratsuka	Tokyo National Stadium
19:02 JST (UTC+09)	K. Miura 12'	J. League		Attendance: 27,001; Referee: Bemard Saules; Assistant referees: Yū Nakamura, Masaaki Shimomura; Fourth official: Noritake Sakurada

2 October 1996 22	Kashiwa Reysol	1–2 (V-goal) (a.e.t.)	Verdy Kawasaki	Hitachi Kashiwa Soccer Stadium
19:03 JST (UTC+09)	Valdir 9'	J. League	K. Miura 31'; Magrão 117'	Attendance: 10,654; Referee: Yasuhiro Matsuzaki; Assistant referees: Kimio Izaki, Kenichi Koshiyama; Fourth official: Eiji Kawai

5 October 1996 23	Verdy Kawasaki	1–2 (V-goal) (a.e.t.)	Avispa Fukuoka	Kawasaki Todoroki Stadium
15:02 JST (UTC+09)	Kurihara 75'	J. League	Ueno 60'; Maradona 101'	Attendance: 14,446; Referee: Yoshimi Ogawa; Assistant referees: Kazuhisa Osada, Ichirō Inukai; Fourth official: Takatoshi Itō

16 October 1996 24	Yokohama Marinos	1–3	Verdy Kawasaki	Tokyo National Stadium
19:03 JST (UTC+09)	Acosta 43'	J. League	Magrão 22'; Bismarck 71'; K. Miura 80'	Attendance: 21,870; Referee: Leslie Mottram; Assistant referees: Hiroshi Fukuda, Tetsu Karakida; Fourth official: Keizō Yamazaki

19 October 1996 25	Verdy Kawasaki	0–1	Júbilo Iwata	Toyama Stadium
15:03 JST (UTC+09)		J. League	Schillaci 6'	Attendance: 10,250; Referee: Bemard Saules; Assistant referees: Takashi Kunori, Kōji Taniuchi; Fourth official: Atsushi Tanaka

26 October 1996 26	Urawa Red Diamonds	1–0	Verdy Kawasaki	Urawa Komaba Stadium
15:01 JST (UTC+09)	Okano 85'	J. League		Attendance: 19,495; Referee: Tōru Kamikawa; Assistant referees: Kazuya Yanagisawa, Hitoshi Nakagomi; Fourth official: Shigeru Kimura

30 October 1996 27	Verdy Kawasaki	1–0	Nagoya Grampus Eight	Kawasaki Todoroki Stadium
19:04 JST (UTC+09)	K. Miura 73'	J. League		Attendance: 12,258; Referee: Shinichirō Obata; Assistant referees: Noboru Ishiyama, Susumu Takeda; Fourth official: Yasuhiro Mineshita

2 November 1996 28	Gamba Osaka	1–3	Verdy Kawasaki	Expo '70 Commemorative Stadium
15:01 JST (UTC+09)	Kojima 60'	J. League	Magrão 53', 66'; K. Miura 86'	Attendance: 12,431; Referee: Leslie Mottram; Assistant referees: Sōichirō Kaneko, Ichirō Inukai; Fourth official: Tsuyoshi Miyake

6 November 1996 29	JEF United Ichihara	1–5	Verdy Kawasaki	Ichihara Stadium
19:00 JST (UTC+09)	Rufer 61'	J. League	K. Miura 0', 11', 89'; Bismarck 36'; Magrão 84'	Attendance: 7,767; Referee: Masayoshi Okada; Assistant referees: Kō Ōishi, Takayoshi Kashino; Fourth official: Terunobu Kakinuma

9 November 1996 30	Verdy Kawasaki	5–0	Kashima Antlers	Kawasaki Todoroki Stadium
14:34 JST (UTC+09)	Magrão 18', 45'; Nakamura 20'; K. Miura 37', 82'	J. League		Attendance: 21,074; Referee: Zoran Petrović; Assistant referees: Hiroshi Fukuda, Susumu Takeda; Fourth official: Mitsune Yamaguchi

=== Emperor's Cup ===
1st Round	bye

2nd Round	bye

17 November 1996 3rd Round	Verdy Kawasaki	4–0	Oita Trinity	Tottori Stadium
: JST (UTC+09)	Kitazawa ?'; Bismarck ?'; K. Miura ?', ?'

23 December 1996 4th Round	Verdy Kawasaki	4–0	Otsuka Pharmaceutical	Kawasaki Todoroki Stadium
: JST (UTC+09)	Bismarck ?'; Magrão ?' ?' (o.g.); K. Miura ?'

26 December 1996 Quarterfinals	Verdy Kawasaki	2–1	Kashima Antlers	Tosu Stadium
: JST (UTC+09)	Argel 2'; K. Miura 25'		Mazinho 28'

29 December 1996 Semifinals	Urawa Red Diamonds	0–3	Verdy Kawasaki	Tokyo National Stadium
13:05 JST (UTC+09)			Bismarck 57'; Y. Miura 70'; Kurihara 83'	Attendance: 28,994; Referee: Zoran Petrović

1 January 1997 Final	Sanfrecce Hiroshima	0–3	Verdy Kawasaki	Tokyo National Stadium
: JST (UTC+09)			Kitazawa ?'; Y. Miura ?'; Kurihara ?'	Attendance: 38,737

=== J.League Cup ===
1 June 1996 GL-B-1-1	Cerezo Osaka	0–1	Verdy Kawasaki	Osaka Nagai No.2 Stadium
19:00 JST (UTC+09)		J. League	Bismarck 30'	Attendance: 13,389; Referee: Yoshitsugu Katayama; Assistant referees: Sōichirō Kaneko, Takuji Fukazawa; Fourth official: Tsuyoshi Miyake

5 June 1996 GL-B-1-2	Verdy Kawasaki	3–0 (4–0 agg.)	Cerezo Osaka	Kawasaki Todoroki Stadium
18:59 JST (UTC+09)	Gen 24', 70'; Nunobe 42'	J. League		Attendance: 7,502; Referee: Tōru Kamikawa; Assistant referees: Toshimitsu Yoshida, Akihisa Makino; Fourth official: Mineo Takada

8 June 1996 GL-B-2-1	Verdy Kawasaki	4–0	Nagoya Grampus Eight	Niigata Stadium
19:01 JST (UTC+09)	Kitazawa 4'; Bismarck 12'; Nunobe 37'; Caíco 41'	J. League		Attendance: 14,208; Referee: Masayoshi Okada; Assistant referees: Mitsuru Satō, Masaaki Shimomura; Fourth official: Hiroshi Abe

12 June 1996 GL-B-2-2	Nagoya Grampus Eight	0–3 (0–7 agg.)	Verdy Kawasaki	Gifu Nagaragawa Stadium
19:00 JST (UTC+09)		J. League	Nunobe 24'; Fujiyoshi 87'; Ishizuka 88'	Attendance: 23,637; Referee: Piotr Werner; Assistant referees: Yasushi Tsuchimoto, Ichirō Inukai; Fourth official: Takahiko Sugiyama

15 June 1996 GL-B-3-1	Yokohama Flügels	5–1	Verdy Kawasaki	Kagoshima Kamoike Stadium
18:34 JST (UTC+09)	Yamaguchi 16'; Maezono 32', 48'; Zinho 64'; Sampaio 89'	J. League	Caíco 79'	Attendance: 11,820; Referee: Archundia; Assistant referees: Tōru Yamashiro, Satoru Kawano; Fourth official: Shōji Hamada

19 June 1996 GL-B-3-2	Verdy Kawasaki	3–1 (4–6 agg.)	Yokohama Flügels	Kawasaki Todoroki Stadium
19:00 JST (UTC+09)	Caíco 56'; Kitazawa 59'; Kurihara 87'	J. League	Zinho 44'	Attendance: 11,431; Referee: Hiroyuki Umemoto; Assistant referees: Akihisa Makino, Hitoshi Nakagomi; Fourth official: Haruo Imai

22 June 1996 GL-B-4-1	JEF United Ichihara	0–2	Verdy Kawasaki	Tecnoport Fukui Stadium
18:00 JST (UTC+09)		J. League	Kitazawa 23'; Bismarck 71'	Attendance: 15,515; Referee: Naotsugu Fuse; Assistant referees: Sōichirō Kaneko, Hideaki Harada; Fourth official: Kazuya Takahara

26 June 1996 GL-B-4-2	Verdy Kawasaki	1–2 (3–2 agg.)	JEF United Ichihara	Kawasaki Todoroki Stadium
19:00 JST (UTC+09)	Nunobe 37'	J. League	Jō 61'; Niimura 76'	Attendance: 6,862; Referee: Piotr Werner; Assistant referees: Mitsuru Satō, Ichirō Inukai; Fourth official: Nobuhiro Shirai

29 June 1996 GL-B-5-1	Verdy Kawasaki	1–1	Kashima Antlers	Kawasaki Todoroki Stadium
19:00 JST (UTC+09)	Argel 78'	J. League	Ishii 29'	Attendance: 22,874; Referee: Keiichi Sunakawa; Assistant referees: Takashi Kunori, Kimio Izaki; Fourth official: Katsuhiro Mori

3 July 1996 GL-B-5-2	Kashima Antlers	1–1 (2–2 agg.)	Verdy Kawasaki	Kashima Soccer Stadium
19:01 JST (UTC+09)	Muroi 65'	J. League	Nunobe 57'	Attendance: 15,594; Referee: Fumikazu Shioyazono; Assistant referees: Yū Nakamura, Takao Onshi; Fourth official: Naoki Ishikawa

10 August 1996 GL-B-6-1	Verdy Kawasaki	0–0	Shimizu S-Pulse	Kawasaki Todoroki Stadium
19:00 JST (UTC+09)		J. League		Attendance: 18,835; Referee: Tetsuya Hamana; Assistant referees: Kenichi Koshiyama, Kō Ōishi; Fourth official: Masaki Yoshihara

14 August 1996 GL-B-6-2	Shimizu S-Pulse	0–0 (0–0 agg.)	Verdy Kawasaki	Nihondaira Sports Stadium
19:00 JST (UTC+09)		J. League		Attendance: 21,438; Referee: Zoran Petrović; Assistant referees: Hitoshi Nakagomi, Hiroyuki Ōnishi; Fourth official: Toshiyuki Asanuma

17 August 1996 GL-B-7-1	Avispa Fukuoka	2–5	Verdy Kawasaki	Hakatanomori Football Stadium
18:31 JST (UTC+09)	Maradona 47', 74'	J. League	Magrão 24'; Kitazawa 33', 59'; K. Miura 52', 69'	Attendance: 12,932; Referee: Hiroyuki Umemoto; Assistant referees: Noboru Ishiyama, Masatoshi Shibata; Fourth official: Syungo Matsufuji

21 August 1996 GL-B-7-2	Verdy Kawasaki	0–1 (5–3 agg.)	Avispa Fukuoka	Kawasaki Todoroki Stadium
19:00 JST (UTC+09)		J. League	Endō 49'	Attendance: 12,483; Referee: Leslie Mottram; Assistant referees: Satoru Ishizawa, Takuji Fukazawa; Fourth official: Haruo Imai

4 September 1996 Semifinals	Kashiwa Reysol	1–2	Verdy Kawasaki	Tokyo National Stadium
19:01 JST (UTC+09)	Arima 59'	J. League	Argel 11'; Magrão 45'	Attendance: 14,155; Referee: Bemard Saules; Assistant referees: Noboru Ishiyama, Yū Nakamura; Fourth official: Yasuhiro Matsuzaki

25 September 1996 Final	Verdy Kawasaki	3–3 (a.e.t.) (4–5 p)	Shimizu S-Pulse	Tokyo National Stadium
19:01 JST (UTC+09)	87' (o.g.); Argel 89'; Bismarck 105'	J. League	Hasegawa 68'; Oliva 81'; Santos 90'	Attendance: 28,232; Referee: Leslie Mottram; Assistant referees: Yoshikazu Hiroshima, Naoki Esumi; Fourth official: Keiichi Sunakawa
	Penalties
	(penalty scored) K. Miura; (penalty missed) Magrão; (penalty scored) Bismarck; (penalty scored) Kitazawa; (penalty scored) Argel		(penalty scored) Sawanobori; (penalty scored) Santos; (penalty scored) Ōenoki; (penalty scored) Morioka; (penalty scored) Oliva

=== Suntory Cup ===
13 November 1996 Semifinals	Kashima Antlers	1–1 (V-goal) (a.e.t.) (4–2 p)	Verdy Kawasaki	Kashima Soccer Stadium
19:04 JST (UTC+09)	Mazinho 9'	J. League	K. Miura 70'	Attendance: 16,081; Referee: Masayoshi Okada; Assistant referees: Keiji Kamiara, Toshimitsu Yoshida; Fourth official: Takao Onshi
	Penalties
	(penalty scored) Mazinho; (penalty scored) Hasegawa; (penalty scored) Honda; (penalty scored) Rodrigo		(penalty scored) K. Miura; (penalty missed) Bismarck; (penalty scored) Kitazawa; (penalty missed) Y. Miura

== Player statistics ==
No.	Pos	Nat	Player	Total		J.League		Emperor's Cup		J.League Cup		Suntory Cup	
No.	Pos	Nat	Player	Apps	Goals	Apps	Goals	Apps	Goals	Apps	Goals	Apps	Goals
	GK	(Japan) JPN	Shinkichi Kikuchi	51	0	30	0	5	0	15	0	1	0
	GK	(Japan) JPN	Takaya Ōishi	1	0	0	0	0	0	1	0	0	0
	GK	(Japan) JPN	Nobuhiro Maeda	0	0	0	0	0	0	0	0	0	0
	GK	(Japan) JPN	Kazuma Itō	0	0	0	0	0	0	0	0	0	0
	GK	(Japan) JPN	Kiyomitsu Kobari	0	0	0	0	0	0	0	0	0	0
	DF	(Japan) JPN	Kō Ishikawa	37	0	19	0	1	0	16	0	1	0
	DF	(Japan) JPN	Kenichiro Tokura	7	0	7	0	0	0	0	0	0	0
	DF	(Japan) JPN	Tadashi Nakamura	47	1	27	1	4	0	16	0	0	0
	DF	(Japan) JPN	Megumu Yoshida	4	0	3	0	0	0	0	0	1	0
	DF	(Japan) JPN	Toshimi Kikuchi	19	0	12	0	5	0	1	0	1	0
	DF	(Japan) JPN	Junji Nishizawa	21	0	12	0	0	0	9	0	0	0
	DF	(Japan) JPN	Yūji Hironaga	12	0	8	0	0	0	4	0	0	0
	DF	(Japan) JPN	Tomo Sugawara	38	1	18	1	5	0	14	0	1	0
	DF	(Japan) JPN	Tomohiro Katayama	0	0	0	0	0	0	0	0	0	0
	DF	(Japan) JPN	Yukinori Shigeta	0	0	0	0	0	0	0	0	0	0
	MF	(Japan) JPN	Ruy Ramos	9	0	9	0	0	0	0	0	0	0
	MF	(Japan) JPN	Tetsuji Hashiratani	32	2	22	2	0	0	10	0	0	0
	MF	(Japan) JPN	Yasutoshi Miura	40	3	19	1	5	2	15	0	1	0
	MF	(Japan) JPN	Tsuyoshi Kitazawa	49	11	28	4	5	2	15	5	1	0
	MF	(Japan) JPN	Shirō Kikuhara	0	0	0	0	0	0	0	0	0	0
	MF	(Japan) JPN	Bismarck	48	12	27	5	5	3	15	4	1	0
	MF	(Japan) JPN	Shigetoshi Hasebe	5	0	5	0	0	0	0	0	0	0
	MF	(Japan) JPN	Kentarō Hayashi	20	1	14	1	5	0	0	0	1	0
	MF	(Japan) JPN	Junichi Watanabe	10	0	7	0	2	0	1	0	0	0
	MF	(Japan) JPN	Shingi Ono	0	0	0	0	0	0	0	0	0	0
	MF	(Brazil) BRA	Caíco	24	4	13	1	0	0	11	3	0	0
	MF	(Japan) JPN	Keiji Ishizuka	3	1	0	0	1	0	2	1	0	0
	MF	(Japan) JPN	Taro Ichiki	0	0	0	0	0	0	0	0	0	0
	FW	(Japan) JPN	Kazuyoshi Miura	39	30	27	23	5	4	6	2	1	1
	FW	(Brazil) BRA	Donizete	14	6	14	6	0	0	0	0	0	0
	FW	(Japan) JPN	Shinji Fujiyoshi	10	1	5	0	0	0	5	1	0	0
	FW	(Japan) JPN	Keisuke Kurihara	17	5	7	2	4	2	5	1	1	0
	FW		Shintetsu Gen (Note: In J.League and domestic competitions, he was considered as a Japanese player.)	15	4	6	2	0	0	9	2	0	0
	FW	(Japan) JPN	Takanori Nunobe	21	5	8	0	2	0	11	5	0	0
	FW	(Japan) JPN	Takashi Ujiie	0	0	0	0	0	0	0	0	0	0
	FW	(Japan) JPN	Mitsunori Yabuta	0	0	0	0	0	0	0	0	0	0
	FW	(Japan) JPN	Kei Hoshikawa	0	0	0	0	0	0	0	0	0	0
	FW	(Japan) JPN	Michiyasu Osada	0	0	0	0	0	0	0	0	0	0
	DF	(Brazil) BRA	Argel †	35	4	14	0	5	1	15	3	1	0
	FW	(Brazil) BRA	Magrão †	24	16	14	13	3	1	6	2	1	0

- † player(s) joined the team after the opening of this season.

== Transfers ==
In:

No.	Pos.	Nation	Player
—	GK	JPN	Nobuhiro Maeda (from Doshisha University)
—	GK	JPN	Kiyomitsu Kobari (from Yomiuri S.C. youth)
—	DF	JPN	Megumu Yoshida (from Doshisha University)
—	MF	JPN	Yasutoshi Miura (from Shimizu S-Pulse)
—	MF	JPN	Shirō Kikuhara (loan return from Urawa Red Diamonds)
—	MF	BRA	Caíco (from Internacional)
—	FW	BRA	Osmar Donizete Cândido (from Botafogo)
—	FW	JPN	Keisuke Kurihara (from Komazawa University)
—	FW		Shintetsu Gen (from Kinki University)
—	FW	JPN	Michiyasu Osada (from Yomiuri S.C. youth)

Out:

No.	Pos.	Nation	Player
—	GK	JPN	Takayuki Fujikawa (retired)
—	GK	JPN	Hiroki Koike (to Toshiba)
—	DF	BRA	Pereira (to Toshiba)
—	DF	JPN	Satoshi Tsunami (to Avispa Fukuoka)
—	MF	BRA	Embu
—	DF	JPN	Shun Suzuki (to Tosu Futures)
—	MF	JPN	Tetsuya Totsuka
—	FW	BRA	Alcindo (to Toshiba)
—	FW	JPN	Nobuhiro Takeda (to Júbilo Iwata)
—	FW	JPN	Tomohiro Hasumi (to Fujitsu)

== Transfers during the season ==
=== In ===
- (Brazil) Argel (from Internacional on May)
- (Japan) Keiji Ishizuka (loan return from Mamoré)
- (Brazil) Magrão (from Coritiba FC on August)

=== Out ===
- (Japan) Keiji Ishizuka (loan to Mamoré)
- (Japan) Ruy Ramos (to Kyoto Purple Sanga)
- (Brazil) Donizete (on August)
- (Japan) Shinji Fujiyoshi (to Kyoto Purple Sanga)
- (Brazil) Caíco (on October)
- (Japan) Shingi Ono (loan to Denso)

== Awards ==
- J.League Top Scorer: (Japan) Kazuyoshi Miura
- J.League Best XI: (Japan) Kazuyoshi Miura

== Other pages ==
- (in Japanese) J. League official site
- (in Japanese) Tokyo Verdy official site
