= 1999 Vissel Kobe season =

Vissel Kobe
1999 season
- Manager: Ryoichi Kawakatsu
- Stadium: Kobe Universiade Memorial Stadium
- J.League 1: 10th
- Emperor's Cup: 3rd Round
- J.League Cup: 1st Round
- Top goalscorer: Kim Do-Hoon (10)
Home colours	Away colours

1999 Vissel Kobe season

== Competitions ==
Competitions	Position
J.League 1	10th / 16 clubs
Emperor's Cup	3rd round
J.League Cup	1st round

== Domestic results ==
=== J.League 1 ===
6 March 1999 1-1	Júbilo Iwata	3-1	Vissel Kobe	Júbilo Iwata Stadium
JST (UTC+09)

13 March 1999 1-2	Vissel Kobe	1-2	Kashima Antlers	Kobe Universiade Memorial Stadium
JST (UTC+09)

20 March 1999 1-3	Urawa Red Diamonds	0-0 (GG) (a.e.t.)	Vissel Kobe	Urawa Komaba Stadium
JST (UTC+09)

27 March 1999 1-4	Vissel Kobe	0-2	Nagoya Grampus Eight	Kobe Universiade Memorial Stadium
JST (UTC+09)

3 April 1999 1-5	Gamba Osaka	2-1	Vissel Kobe	Osaka Expo '70 Stadium
JST (UTC+09)

10 April 1999 1-6	Vissel Kobe	4-3 (GG) (a.e.t.)	JEF United Ichihara	Kobe Universiade Memorial Stadium
JST (UTC+09)

17 April 1999 1-7	Vissel Kobe	1-2 (GG) (a.e.t.)	Avispa Fukuoka	Kobe Universiade Memorial Stadium
JST (UTC+09)

24 April 1999 1-8	Sanfrecce Hiroshima	2-5	Vissel Kobe	Hiroshima Stadium
JST (UTC+09)

28 April 1999 1-9	Vissel Kobe	1-2 (GG) (a.e.t.)	Verdy Kawasaki	Kobe Universiade Memorial Stadium
JST (UTC+09)

1 May 1999 1-10	Bellmare Hiratsuka	2-1	Vissel Kobe	Hiratsuka Athletics Stadium
JST (UTC+09)

5 May 1999 1-11	Vissel Kobe	3-2	Kyoto Purple Sanga	Kobe Universiade Memorial Stadium
JST (UTC+09)

8 May 1999 1-12	Kashiwa Reysol	1-0	Vissel Kobe	Hitachi Kashiwa Soccer Stadium
JST (UTC+09)

15 May 1999 1-13	Vissel Kobe	1-0	Yokohama F. Marinos	Kobe Universiade Memorial Stadium
JST (UTC+09)

22 May 1999 1-14	Shimizu S-Pulse	1-0	Vissel Kobe	Nihondaira Sports Stadium
JST (UTC+09)

29 May 1999 1-15	Vissel Kobe	1-0	Cerezo Osaka	Kobe Universiade Memorial Stadium
JST (UTC+09)

7 August 1999 2-1	Avispa Fukuoka	1-1 (GG) (a.e.t.)	Vissel Kobe	Hakatanomori Football Stadium
JST (UTC+09)

14 August 1999 2-2	Vissel Kobe	3-2 (GG) (a.e.t.)	Sanfrecce Hiroshima	Kobe Universiade Memorial Stadium
JST (UTC+09)

18 August 1999 2-3	Verdy Kawasaki	2-3	Vissel Kobe	Todoroki Athletics Stadium
JST (UTC+09)

21 August 1999 2-4	Vissel Kobe	2-2 (GG) (a.e.t.)	Bellmare Hiratsuka	Kobe Universiade Memorial Stadium
JST (UTC+09)

28 August 1999 2-5	Kyoto Purple Sanga	3-1	Vissel Kobe	Nishikyogoku Athletic Stadium
JST (UTC+09)

4 September 1999 2-6	Vissel Kobe	0-2	Kashiwa Reysol	Kobe Universiade Memorial Stadium
JST (UTC+09)

11 September 1999 2-7	Yokohama F. Marinos	0-1	Vissel Kobe	International Stadium Yokohama
JST (UTC+09)

15 September 1999 2-8	Vissel Kobe	1-2	Shimizu S-Pulse	Kobe Universiade Memorial Stadium
JST (UTC+09)

18 September 1999 2-9	Cerezo Osaka	5-0	Vissel Kobe	Osaka Nagai Stadium
JST (UTC+09)

23 September 1999 2-10	Vissel Kobe	0-0 (GG) (a.e.t.)	Júbilo Iwata	Kobe Universiade Memorial Stadium
JST (UTC+09)

30 October 1999 2-11	Vissel Kobe	2-0	Urawa Red Diamonds	Kobe Universiade Memorial Stadium
JST (UTC+09)

17 November 1999 2-12	Kashima Antlers	0-1 (GG) (a.e.t.)	Vissel Kobe	Kashima Soccer Stadium
JST (UTC+09)

20 November 1999 2-13	JEF United Ichihara	0-1	Vissel Kobe	Ichihara Seaside Stadium
JST (UTC+09)

23 November 1999 2-14	Vissel Kobe	2-1	Gamba Osaka	Kobe Universiade Memorial Stadium
JST (UTC+09)

27 November 1999 2-15	Nagoya Grampus Eight	1-0	Vissel Kobe	Mizuho Athletic Stadium
JST (UTC+09)

=== Emperor's Cup ===
1st Round	bye

2nd Round	bye

12 December 1999 3rd Round	Vissel Kobe	0-0 (GG) (a.e.t.) (3-4 p)	Montedio Yamagata	Kobe Universiade Memorial Stadium
JST (UTC+09)

=== J.League Cup ===
7 April 1999 1st Round-1	FC Tokyo	1-1	Vissel Kobe	Nishigaoka Soccer Stadium
JST (UTC+09)

14 April 1999 1st Round-2	Vissel Kobe	1-2 (GG) (a.e.t.) (2-3 agg.)	FC Tokyo	Kobe Universiade Memorial Stadium
JST (UTC+09)

== Player statistics ==
No.	Pos.	Nat.	Player	D.o.B. (Age)	Height / Weight	J.League 1		Emperor's Cup		J.League Cup		Total	
No.	Pos.	Nat.	Player	D.o.B. (Age)	Height / Weight	Apps	Goals	Apps	Goals	Apps	Goals	Apps	Goals
1	GK	(Japan)	Nobuhiro Maeda	June 3, 1973 (aged 25)	cm / kg	11	0						
2	DF	(Japan)	Keiji Kaimoto	November 26, 1972 (aged 26)	cm / kg	28	1						
3	DF	(Japan)	Megumu Yoshida	April 13, 1973 (aged 25)	cm / kg	16	0						
4	DF	(Japan)	Yukio Tsuchiya	July 31, 1974 (aged 24)	cm / kg	27	0						
5	DF	(South Korea)	Choi Sung-Yong	December 25, 1975 (aged 23)	cm / kg	26	0						
6	MF	(Japan)	Yuta Abe	July 31, 1974 (aged 24)	cm / kg	25	1						
7	MF	(Japan)	Michiyasu Osada	March 5, 1978 (aged 21)	cm / kg	22	4						
8	MF	(Japan)	Takanori Nunobe	September 23, 1973 (aged 25)	cm / kg	29	2						
9	FW	(South Korea)	Kim Do-Hoon	July 21, 1970 (aged 28)	cm / kg	25	10						
10	MF	(Japan)	Shigetoshi Hasebe	April 23, 1971 (aged 27)	cm / kg	27	1						
11	FW	(Japan)	Mitsutoshi Watada	March 26, 1976 (aged 22)	cm / kg	17	0						
13	FW	(Japan)	Akihiro Nagashima	April 9, 1964 (aged 34)	cm / kg	26	7						
14	FW	(Japan)	Tomoji Eguchi	April 22, 1977 (aged 21)	cm / kg	1	0						
15	MF	(Japan)	Koji Yoshimura	April 13, 1976 (aged 22)	cm / kg	25	2						
16	GK	(Japan)	Jiro Takeda	September 18, 1972 (aged 26)	cm / kg	20	0						
17	MF	(South Korea)	Ha Seok-ju	February 20, 1968 (aged 31)	cm / kg	28	7						
18	DF	(Japan)	Takashi Kojima	August 4, 1973 (aged 25)	cm / kg	5	0						
19	DF	(Japan)	Kazuyoshi Mikami	August 29, 1975 (aged 23)	cm / kg	24	0						
20	MF	(Japan)	Yusuke Sato	November 2, 1977 (aged 21)	cm / kg	2	0						
21	GK	(Japan)	Shinya Ando	July 7, 1976 (aged 22)	cm / kg	0	0						
22	FW	(Japan)	Junichi Kawamura	June 24, 1980 (aged 18)	cm / kg	0	0						
23	DF		Park Song-Gi	August 23, 1974 (aged 24)	cm / kg	0	0						
24	DF	(Japan)	Seiji Kawase	August 2, 1976 (aged 22)	cm / kg	0	0						
25	FW	(Japan)	Masato Tachibana	January 11, 1980 (aged 19)	cm / kg	0	0						
26	DF	(Japan)	Naoto Matsuo	September 10, 1979 (aged 19)	cm / kg	0	0						
27	MF	(Japan)	Takayuki Yamaguchi	August 1, 1973 (aged 25)	cm / kg	8	1						

== Other pages ==
- (in Japanese) J.League official site
