= Shintetsu Gen =

Japanese footballer

Shintetsu Gen 玄 新哲
Personal information
- Full name: Shintetsu Gen
- Date of birth: August 6, 1973 (age 53)
- Place of birth: Osaka, Japan
- Height: 1.85 m (6 ft 1 in)
- Position: Forward

Youth career
- 1992–1995: Kindai University

Senior career*
Years	Team	Apps	(Gls)
1996–1998	Verdy Kawasaki	16	(4)
1999	Cerezo Osaka	0	(0)
Total		16	(4)
- * Club domestic league appearances and goals

Shintetsu Gen (玄 新哲, Gen Shintetsu; born August 6, 1973) is a former Japanese football player.

== Playing career ==
Gen was born in Osaka Prefecture on August 6, 1973. After graduating from Kindai University, he joined J1 League club Verdy Kawasaki in 1996. The club won second place at the 1996 J.League Cup and won the 1996 Emperor's Cup. Although he played several matches as forward every season until 1998, he did not play many matches overall. In 1999, he moved to Cerezo Osaka. However he did not play at all and retired at the end of the 1999 season.

== Career statistics ==
Appearances and goals by club, season and competition
Club	Season	League			Emperor's Cup		J.League Cup		Total	
Club	Season	Division	Apps	Goals	Apps	Goals	Apps	Goals	Apps	Goals
Verdy Kawasaki	1996	J1 League	6	2	0	0	9	2	15	4
Verdy Kawasaki	1997	J1 League	8	2	0	0	0	0	8	2
Verdy Kawasaki	1998	J1 League	2	0			1	0	3	0
Cerezo Osaka	1999	J1 League	0	0			0	0	0	0
Career total			16	4	0	0	10	2	26	6
