= Nobuhiro Maeda =

Japanese footballer

Nobuhiro Maeda 前田 信弘
Personal information
- Date of birth: 3 June 1973 (age 53)
- Place of birth: Marugame, Kagawa, Japan
- Height: 1.88 m (6 ft 2 in)
- Position: Goalkeeper

Youth career
- 1989–1991: Marugame High School
- 1992–1995: Doshisha University

Senior career*
Years	Team	Apps	(Gls)
1996–1997	Verdy Kawasaki	0	(0)
1998–1999	Vissel Kobe	32	(0)
2000	Shimizu S-Pulse	0	(0)
2001–2003	Albirex Niigata	0	(0)
2004	Albirex Niigata Singapore	19	(0)
Total		51	(0)
Medal record
Verdy Kawasaki
Runner-up	J.League Cup	1996
Winner	Emperor's Cup	1996
Shimizu S-Pulse
Runner-up	Emperor's Cup	2000
- * Club domestic league appearances and goals

Nobuhiro Maeda (前田 信弘, Maeda Nobuhiro; born 3 June 1973) is a former Japanese football player.

== Playing career ==
Maeda was born in Marugame on 3 June 1973. After graduating from Doshisha University, he joined J1 League club Verdy Kawasaki in 1996. However, he could not play at all in the match behind Shinkichi Kikuchi and Kenji Honnami until 1997. In 1998, he moved to Vissel Kobe and he became a regular goalkeeper from the middle of 1998. However he could not play at all in the match behind Jiro Takeda from the middle of 1999. In 2000, he moved to Shimizu S-Pulse. However he could not play at all in the match behind Masanori Sanada. In 2001, he moved to J2 League club Albirex Niigata. However he could hardly play in the match behind Yosuke Nozawa. In 2004, he moved to Albirex Niigata Singapore. He played many matches and retired end of 2004 season.

== Club statistics ==
Club performance			League		Cup		League Cup		Total	
Season	Club	League	Apps	Goals	Apps	Goals	Apps	Goals	Apps	Goals
Japan			League		Emperor's Cup		J.League Cup		Total	
1996	Verdy Kawasaki	J1 League	0	0	0	0	0	0	0	0
1997	Verdy Kawasaki	J1 League	0	0	0	0	0	0	0	0
1998	Vissel Kobe	J1 League	21	0	0	0	0	0	21	0
1999	Vissel Kobe	J1 League	11	0	0	0	2	0	13	0
2000	Shimizu S-Pulse	J1 League	0	0	0	0	0	0	0	0
2001	Albirex Niigata	J2 League	0	0	2	0	1	0	3	0
2002	Albirex Niigata	J2 League	0	0	0	0	-		0	0
2003	Albirex Niigata	J2 League	0	0	1	0	-		1	0
Singapore			League		Singapore Cup		League Cup		Total	
2004	Albirex Niigata Singapore	S.League	19	0	0	0	0	0	19	0
Country	Japan		32	0	3	0	3	0	38	0
Country	Singapore		19	0	0	0	0	0	19	0
Total			51	0	3	0	3	0	57	0
