= Kentaro Hayashi =

Japanese footballer

Kentaro Hayashi 林 健太郎
Personal information
- Full name: Kentaro Hayashi
- Date of birth: August 29, 1972 (age 54)
- Place of birth: Machida, Tokyo, Japan
- Height: 1.82 m (6 ft 0 in)
- Positions: Midfielder; defender

Youth career
- 1988–1990: Toin Gakuen High School

College career
Years	Team	Apps	(Gls)
1991–1994	Komazawa University		

Senior career*
Years	Team	Apps	(Gls)
1995–2005	Tokyo Verdy	250	(18)
1998	→Vissel Kobe (loan)	7	(0)
2006–2009	Ventforet Kofu	112	(5)
Total		369	(23)

International career
1995	Japan	2	(0)

Managerial career
- 2018: Vissel Kobe
- 2024-: Gainare Tottori
Medal record
Tokyo Verdy
Runner-up	J1 League	1995
Runner-up	J.League Cup	1996
Winner	Emperor's Cup	1996
Winner	Emperor's Cup	2004
- * Club domestic league appearances and goals

Kentaro Hayashi (林 健太郎, Hayashi Kentaro; born August 29, 1972) is a former Japanese football player. He played for Japan national team.

== Club career ==
Hayashi was born in Machida on August 29, 1972. After graduating from Komazawa University, he joined Verdy Kawasaki (later Tokyo Verdy) in 1995. Although he played as regular player in first season, his opportunity to play decreased from 1996. In 1998, he moved to Vissel Kobe on loan. In 1999, he returned to Verdy Kawasaki and he became a regular player. The club won 2004 Emperor's Cup. However the club was relegated to J2 League in 2005. He moved to Ventforet Kofu. He retired at the end of the 2009 season.

== National team career ==
On August 6, 1995, Hayashi debuted for Japan national team against Costa Rica. On August 9, he also played against Brazil. He played 2 games for Japan in 1995.

== Coaching career ==
After the retirement, Hayashi signed with Vissel Kobe in 2018. He served as an assistant coach under manager Takayuki Yoshida in April. In September, manager Yoshida resigned for poor results. Hayashi managed 2 matches until Vissel signed with new manager Juan Manuel Lillo. In June 2019, Hayashi resigned with Vissel.

== Club statistics ==
Appearances and goals by club, season and competition
Club	Season	League			Emperor's Cup		J. League Cup		Total	
Club	Season	Division	Apps	Goals	Apps	Goals	Apps	Goals	Apps	Goals
Verdy Kawasaki	1995	J1 League	43	0	3	0	-		46	0
Verdy Kawasaki	1996	J1 League	14	1	5	0	0	0	19	1
Verdy Kawasaki	1997	J1 League	9	0	2	0	5	1	16	1
Verdy Kawasaki	1998	J1 League	3	0	0	0	2	0	5	0
Vissel Kobe	1998	J1 League	7	0	2	0	0	0	9	0
Verdy Kawasaki	1999	J1 League	29	7	4	0	4	0	37	7
Verdy Kawasaki	2000	J1 League	27	6	2	0	6	0	35	6
Tokyo Verdy	2001	J1 League	17	2	2	0	2	0	21	2
Tokyo Verdy	2002	J1 League	20	0	1	0	4	0	25	0
Tokyo Verdy	2003	J1 League	29	1	3	0	3	0	35	1
Tokyo Verdy	2004	J1 League	29	1	5	1	7	1	41	3
Tokyo Verdy	2005	J1 League	30	0	1	0	6	0	37	0
Ventforet Kofu	2006	J1 League	30	0	3	0	3	1	36	1
Ventforet Kofu	2007	J1 League	24	1	1	0	5	0	30	1
Ventforet Kofu	2008	J2 League	31	4	2	0	-		33	4
Ventforet Kofu	2009	J2 League	27	0	2	0	-		29	0
Total			369	23	38	1	47	3	454	27

== National team statistics ==
Japan national team
Year	Apps	Goals
1995	2	0
Total	2	0

== Managerial statistics ==
Team	From	To	Record				
Team	From	To	G	W	D	L	Win %
Vissel Kobe	2018	2018	2	0	0	2	0.00
Total			2	0	0	2	0.00
