= Megumu Yoshida =

Japanese footballer and manager (born 1973)

Megumu Yoshida 吉田 恵
Personal information
- Full name: Megumu Yoshida
- Date of birth: April 13, 1973 (age 53)
- Place of birth: Aichi, Japan
- Height: 1.76 m (5 ft 9 in)
- Position: Defender

Youth career
- 1989–1991: Chukyo University Chukyo High School
- 1992–1995: Doshisha University

Senior career*
Years	Team	Apps	(Gls)
1996–1997	Verdy Kawasaki	3	(0)
1998–2000	Vissel Kobe	64	(0)
2001–2003	JEF United Ichihara	30	(1)
2004–2005	Sanfrecce Hiroshima	27	(0)
2006–2007	Sagan Tosu	42	(1)
Total		166	(2)

Managerial career
- 2014: Sagan Tosu
- 2016: FC Gifu
Medal record
Verdy Kawasaki
Runner-up	J.League Cup	1996
Winner	Emperor's Cup	1996
- * Club domestic league appearances and goals

Megumu Yoshida (吉田 恵, Yoshida Megumi; born April 13, 1973) is a former Japanese football player and manager. He is the currently assistant manager of J1 League club Avispa Fukuoka.

== Playing career ==
Yoshida was born in Aichi Prefecture on April 13, 1973. After graduating from Doshisha University, he joined J1 League club Verdy Kawasaki in 1996. Although he debuted in 1996, he hardly played matches until 1997. In 1998, he moved to Vissel Kobe. He played many matches as left back over 3 seasons. In 2001, he moved to JEF United Ichihara. He switched to playing as leftmost of a back three. However his opportunity to play decreased from 2002. In 2004, he moved to Sanfrecce Hiroshima. However he could hardly play in matches in 2005. In 2006, he moved to J2 League club Sagan Tosu. He switched again to playing as a center back for 2 seasons. He retired at the end of the 2007 season.

== Coaching career ==
After retirement, Yoshida started coaching career at Sanfrecce Hiroshima in 2008. He coached for youth team in 2008. In 2009, he became a coach for his local university, Chukyo University. In 2010, he signed with Sagan Tosu and became a coach for their main team. In August 2014, manager Yoon Jong-hwan was sacked and Yoshida became the new manager. He managed the club until end of 2014 season and he returned to coaching in 2015. In 2016, he moved to FC Gifu and became a coach under manager Ruy Ramos. In July 2016, Ramos was sacked and Yoshida became the new manager. In 2017, he moved to V-Varen Nagasaki and became a coach.

== Career statistics ==
Appearances and goals by club, season and competition
Club	Season	League			Emperor's Cup		J.League Cup		Total	
Club	Season	Division	Apps	Goals	Apps	Goals	Apps	Goals	Apps	Goals
Verdy Kawasaki	1996	J1 League	3	0	0	0	0	0	3	0
Verdy Kawasaki	1997	J1 League	0	0	0	0	0	0	0	0
Vissel Kobe	1998	J1 League	22	0	2	0	4	0	28	0
Vissel Kobe	1999	J1 League	16	0	1	0	2	0	19	0
Vissel Kobe	2000	J1 League	26	0	0	0	4	0	30	0
JEF United Ichihara	2001	J1 League	22	1	1	0	6	0	29	1
JEF United Ichihara	2002	J1 League	8	0	4	0	5	0	17	0
JEF United Ichihara	2003	J1 League	0	0	0	0	1	0	1	0
Sanfrecce Hiroshima	2004	J1 League	26	0	1	0	6	0	33	0
Sanfrecce Hiroshima	2005	J1 League	1	0	0	0	2	0	3	0
Sagan Tosu	2006	J2 League	14	0	2	0	—		16	0
Sagan Tosu	2007	J2 League	28	1	3	0	—		31	1
Career total			166	2	14	0	31	0	211	2

== Managerial statistics ==
Team	From	To	Record				
Team	From	To	G	W	D	L	Win %
Sagan Tosu	2014	2014	16	7	2	7	43.75
FC Gifu	2016	2016	18	5	4	9	27.78
Total			34	12	6	16	35.29
