= 1998 Vissel Kobe season =

Vissel Kobe
1998 season
- Manager: Benito Floro; Haruki Kori
- Stadium: Kobe Universiade Memorial Stadium
- J.League: 17th
- Emperor's Cup: 3rd Round
- J.League Cup: GL-D 4th
- Top goalscorer: Kim Do-Hoon (17)
Home colours	Away colours

1998 Vissel Kobe season

== Competitions ==
Competitions	Position
J.League	17th / 18 clubs
Emperor's Cup	3rd round
J.League Cup	GL-D 4th / 5 clubs

== Domestic results ==
=== J.League ===
21 March 1998 1–1	Nagoya Grampus Eight	2–3	Vissel Kobe	Mizuho Athletic Stadium
JST (UTC+09)

25 March 1998 1–2	Vissel Kobe	1–2	Bellmare Hiratsuka	Kobe Universiade Memorial Stadium
JST (UTC+09)

28 March 1998 1–3	Júbilo Iwata	4–3	Vissel Kobe	Júbilo Iwata Stadium
JST (UTC+09)

4 April 1998 1–4	Vissel Kobe	0–2	Verdy Kawasaki	Kobe Universiade Memorial Stadium
JST (UTC+09)

11 April 1998 1–5	Kyoto Purple Sanga	2–1	Vissel Kobe	Nishikyogoku Athletic Stadium
JST (UTC+09)

15 April 1998 1–6	JEF United Ichihara	1–2	Vissel Kobe	Ichihara Seaside Stadium
JST (UTC+09)

18 April 1998 1–7	Vissel Kobe	1–4	Yokohama Flügels	Kobe Universiade Memorial Stadium
JST (UTC+09)

25 April 1998 1–8	Cerezo Osaka	1–2	Vissel Kobe	Osaka Nagai Stadium
JST (UTC+09)

29 April 1998 1–9	Vissel Kobe	0–2	Sanfrecce Hiroshima	Kobe Universiade Memorial Stadium
JST (UTC+09)

2 May 1998 1–10	Avispa Fukuoka	3–1	Vissel Kobe	Hakatanomori Football Stadium
JST (UTC+09)

5 May 1998 1–11	Vissel Kobe	2–3	Consadole Sapporo	Kobe Universiade Memorial Stadium
JST (UTC+09)

9 May 1998 1–12	Shimizu S-Pulse	4–0	Vissel Kobe	Nihondaira Sports Stadium
JST (UTC+09)

25 July 1998 1–13	Vissel Kobe	2–3	Kashima Antlers	Kobe Universiade Memorial Stadium
JST (UTC+09)

29 July 1998 1–14	Kashiwa Reysol	4–0	Vissel Kobe	Hitachi Kashiwa Soccer Stadium
JST (UTC+09)

1 August 1998 1–15	Vissel Kobe	0–4	Gamba Osaka	Kobe Universiade Memorial Stadium
JST (UTC+09)

5 August 1998 1–16	Yokohama Marinos	2–1 (GG) (a.e.t.)	Vissel Kobe	International Stadium Yokohama
JST (UTC+09)

8 August 1998 1–17	Vissel Kobe	1–5	Urawa Red Diamonds	Kobe Universiade Memorial Stadium
JST (UTC+09)

22 August 1998 2–1	Vissel Kobe	0–2	Kashiwa Reysol	Kobe Universiade Memorial Stadium
JST (UTC+09)

29 August 1998 2–2	Gamba Osaka	1–0 (GG) (a.e.t.)	Vissel Kobe	Osaka Expo '70 Stadium
JST (UTC+09)

5 September 1998 2–3	Vissel Kobe	2–3	Yokohama Marinos	Kobe Universiade Memorial Stadium
JST (UTC+09)

12 September 1998 2–4	Urawa Red Diamonds	2–1	Vissel Kobe	Urawa Komaba Stadium
JST (UTC+09)

15 September 1998 2–5	Vissel Kobe	1–3	Nagoya Grampus Eight	Kobe Universiade Memorial Stadium
JST (UTC+09)

19 September 1998 2–6	Bellmare Hiratsuka	1–0	Vissel Kobe	Hiratsuka Athletics Stadium
JST (UTC+09)

23 September 1998 2–7	Vissel Kobe	0–7	Júbilo Iwata	Kobe Universiade Memorial Stadium
JST (UTC+09)

26 September 1998 2–8	Verdy Kawasaki	1–2	Vissel Kobe	Todoroki Athletics Stadium
JST (UTC+09)

3 October 1998 2–9	Vissel Kobe	0–2	Kyoto Purple Sanga	Kobe Universiade Memorial Stadium
JST (UTC+09)

14 October 1998 2–10	Vissel Kobe	5–5 (GG) (a.e.t.) (5–3 p)	JEF United Ichihara	Kobe Universiade Memorial Stadium
JST (UTC+09)

17 October 1998 2–11	Yokohama Flügels	4–3	Vissel Kobe	Yokohama Mitsuzawa Stadium
JST (UTC+09)

21 October 1998 2–12	Vissel Kobe	2–0	Cerezo Osaka	Kobe Universiade Memorial Stadium
JST (UTC+09)

24 October 1998 2–13	Sanfrecce Hiroshima	2–3	Vissel Kobe	Hiroshima Big Arch
JST (UTC+09)

31 October 1998 2–14	Vissel Kobe	2–1	Avispa Fukuoka	Kobe Universiade Memorial Stadium
JST (UTC+09)

3 November 1998 2–15	Consadole Sapporo	3–0	Vissel Kobe	Sapporo Atsubetsu Park Stadium
JST (UTC+09)

7 November 1998 2–16	Vissel Kobe	3–0	Shimizu S-Pulse	Kobe Universiade Memorial Stadium
JST (UTC+09)

14 November 1998 2–17	Kashima Antlers	4–1	Vissel Kobe	Kashima Soccer Stadium
JST (UTC+09)

=== Emperor's Cup ===
1st Round	bye

6 December 1998 2nd Round	Kagoshima Jitsugyo High School	0–7	Vissel Kobe	Kobe Universiade Memorial Stadium
JST (UTC+09)

13 December 1998 3rd Round	Consadole Sapporo	2–1 (GG) (a.e.t.)	Vissel Kobe	Kobe Universiade Memorial Stadium
JST (UTC+09)

=== J.League Cup ===
16 May 1998 GL-D-1	Nagoya Grampus Eight	1–1	Vissel Kobe	Mizuho Athletic Stadium
JST (UTC+09)

23 May 1998 GL-D-2	Vissel Kobe	0–2	Bellmare Hiratsuka	Kobe Universiade Memorial Stadium
JST (UTC+09)

30 May 1998 GL-D-3	Vissel Kobe	3–1	Kyoto Purple Sanga	Kobe Universiade Memorial Stadium
JST (UTC+09)

3 June 1998 GL-D-4	JEF United Ichihara	4–1	Vissel Kobe	Ichihara Seaside Stadium
JST (UTC+09)

GL-D-5	bye

== Player statistics ==
No.	Pos.	Nat.	Player	D.o.B. (Age)	Height / Weight	J.League		Emperor's Cup		J.League Cup		Total	
No.	Pos.	Nat.	Player	D.o.B. (Age)	Height / Weight	Apps	Goals	Apps	Goals	Apps	Goals	Apps	Goals
1	GK	(Japan)	Ryuji Ishizue	July 22, 1964 (aged 33)	cm / kg	13	0						
2	DF	(Japan)	Naoki Naito	May 30, 1968 (aged 29)	cm / kg	5	0						
3	DF	(Japan)	Megumu Yoshida	April 13, 1973 (aged 24)	cm / kg	22	0						
4	DF	(Serbia and Montenegro)	Budimir Vujačić	January 4, 1966 (aged 32)	cm / kg	0	0						
4	DF	(Spain)	Albert Tomas	December 19, 1970 (aged 27)	cm / kg	17	1						
5	MF	(Japan)	Ryuji Kubota	July 24, 1976 (aged 21)	cm / kg	20	0						
6	MF	(Japan)	Yuta Abe	July 31, 1974 (aged 23)	cm / kg	30	2						
7	DF	(Japan)	Masahiro Wada	January 21, 1965 (aged 33)	cm / kg	0	0						
8	MF	(Japan)	Takanori Nunobe	September 23, 1973 (aged 24)	cm / kg	31	2						
9	FW	(South Korea)	Kim Do-Hoon	July 21, 1970 (aged 27)	cm / kg	33	17						
10	MF	(Japan)	Shigetoshi Hasebe	April 23, 1971 (aged 26)	cm / kg	29	1						
11	FW	(Japan)	Takuya Jinno	June 1, 1970 (aged 27)	cm / kg	28	2						
12	DF		Park Song-Gi	August 23, 1974 (aged 23)	cm / kg	0	0						
13	FW	(Japan)	Akihiro Nagashima	April 9, 1964 (aged 33)	cm / kg	28	10						
14	FW	(Japan)	Tomoji Eguchi	April 22, 1977 (aged 20)	cm / kg	22	0						
15	DF	(Japan)	Masakazu Koda	September 12, 1969 (aged 28)	cm / kg	8	0						
16	GK	(Japan)	Masamitsu Kanemoto	October 17, 1962 (aged 35)	cm / kg	1	0						
17	FW	(Japan)	Mitsutoshi Watada	March 26, 1976 (aged 21)	cm / kg	28	2						
18	DF	(Japan)	Keiji Kaimoto	November 26, 1972 (aged 25)	cm / kg	32	4						
19	DF	(Japan)	Kazuyoshi Mikami	August 29, 1975 (aged 22)	cm / kg	21	0						
20	FW	(Japan)	Jun Iwashita	April 8, 1973 (aged 24)	cm / kg	0	0						
21	GK	(Japan)	Takaya Nakamura	June 3, 1978 (aged 19)	cm / kg	0	0						
22	MF	(Japan)	Koji Yoshimura	April 13, 1976 (aged 21)	cm / kg	27	1						
23	FW		Michael Yano	January 22, 1979 (aged 19)	cm / kg	3	0						
24	MF	(Japan)	Koji Okamoto	April 9, 1976 (aged 21)	cm / kg	0	0						
25	MF	(Japan)	Takuya Suzumura	September 13, 1978 (aged 19)	cm / kg	0	0						
26	MF	(Japan)	Yusuke Sato	November 2, 1977 (aged 20)	cm / kg	2	0						
27	FW	(Japan)	Yuichi Yoda	June 25, 1977 (aged 20)	cm / kg	2	0						
28	MF	(Japan)	Ryuji Ishikawa	November 11, 1978 (aged 19)	cm / kg	0	0						
29	DF	(Japan)	Masahiro Nakanishi	May 25, 1978 (aged 19)	cm / kg	0	0						
30	DF	(Japan)	Naoto Matsuo	September 10, 1979 (aged 18)	cm / kg	16	0						
31	GK	(Japan)	Nobuhiro Maeda	June 3, 1973 (aged 24)	cm / kg	21	0						
32	FW	(Japan)	Masato Tachibana	January 11, 1980 (aged 18)	cm / kg	0	0						
33	MF	(Australia)	Matthew Bingley	August 16, 1971 (aged 26)	cm / kg	10	1						
33	MF	(South Korea)	Ha Seok-Ju	February 20, 1968 (aged 30)	cm / kg	9	2						
34	MF	(Japan)	Kentaro Hayashi	August 29, 1972 (aged 25)	cm / kg	7	0						

== Other pages ==
- (in Japanese) J.League official site
