= Shigetoshi Hasebe =

Japanese footballer and manager

Shigetoshi Hasebe 長谷部 茂利
Personal information
- Full name: Shigetoshi Hasebe
- Date of birth: April 23, 1971 (age 55)
- Place of birth: Sakae-ku, Yokohama, Kanagawa, Japan
- Height: 1.73 m (5 ft 8 in)
- Position: Midfielder

Team information
- Current team: Kawasaki Frontale (manager)

Youth career
- 1987–1989: Toin Gakuen High School

College career
Years	Team	Apps	(Gls)
1990–1993	Chuo University		

Senior career*
Years	Team	Apps	(Gls)
1994–1997	Verdy Kawasaki	61	(3)
1997	Kawasaki Frontale	15	(6)
1998–2000	Vissel Kobe	81	(2)
2001–2003	JEF United Ichihara	41	(1)
Total		198	(12)

Managerial career
- 2006–2011: Vissel Kobe (youth)
- 2011–2016: Vissel Kobe (technical assistant)
- 2016: JEF United Chiba (caretaker)
- 2016–2017: JEF United Chiba
- 2017–2018: JEF United Chiba (assistant)
- 2018–2019: Mito HollyHock
- 2020–2024: Avispa Fukuoka
- 2025–: Kawasaki Frontale
Medal record
Verdy Kawasaki
Winner	J1 League	1994
Runner-up	J1 League	1995
Winner	J.League Cup	1994
Runner-up	J.League Cup	1996
Winner	Emperor's Cup	1996
- * Club domestic league appearances and goals

Shigetoshi Hasebe (長谷部 茂利, Hasebe Shigetoshi; born April 23, 1971) is a former Japanese football player and manager, he is the currently manager of J1 League club Kawasaki Frontale.

== Playing career ==
Hasebe was born in Yokohama on April 23, 1971. After graduating from Chuo University, he joined Verdy Kawasaki in 1994. He played many matches as a central midfielder and the club won the championship in 1994 J1 League. However his opportunity to play decreased from 1996 and he moved to Japan Football League club Kawasaki Frontale in August 1997. He played many matches at Frontale in 1997 and he moved to Vissel Kobe in 1998. He wore the number 10 shirt for the club and played as central player of the club. In 2001, he moved to JEF United Ichihara and he played many matches. However he struggled to make the first team in 2003 and he left the club in July.

== Coaching career ==
=== Vissel Kobe ===
After retiring, in 2006, Hasebe became a coach of Vissel Kobe youth team. In 2011, he became the coach of the first team.

=== JEF United Chiba ===
In 2016, Hasebe moved to J2 League side JEF United Chiba and became a coach of the club. In July, after manager Takashi Sekizuka was sacked, Hasebe was promoted to interim manager from coach on July 25, returning to the role of assistant coach after the appointment of Argentine manager Juan Esnáider on 25 November 2016.

=== Mito HollyHock ===
On 11 December 2017, Hasebe was named manager of the J2 League side Mito HollyHock from 2018.

On 31 October 2024, Hasebe announced he would be resigning from Avispa Fukuoka at the end of the 2024 season. On 12 December 2024 Hasebe was announced Kawasaki Frontale head coach for the 2025 Season.

== Career statistics ==
Appearances and goals by club, season and competition
Club	Season	League			Emperor's Cup		J.League Cup		Total	
Club	Season	Division	Apps	Goals	Apps	Goals	Apps	Goals	Apps	Goals
Verdy Kawasaki	1994	J1 League	20	1	1	0	1	0	22	1
Verdy Kawasaki	1995	J1 League	29	2	1	0	-		30	2
Verdy Kawasaki	1996	J1 League	5	0	0	0	0	0	5	0
Verdy Kawasaki	1997	J1 League	7	0	0	0	6	2	13	2
Kawasaki Frontale	1997	Football League	15	6	3	0	-		18	6
Vissel Kobe	1998	J1 League	29	1	2	1	2	0	33	2
Vissel Kobe	1999	J1 League	27	1	1	0	2	0	30	1
Vissel Kobe	2000	J1 League	25	0	4	0	4	0	33	0
JEF United Ichihara	2001	J1 League	24	1	3	1	5	0	32	2
JEF United Ichihara	2002	J1 League	17	0	1	0	4	0	22	0
JEF United Ichihara	2003	J1 League	0	0	0	0	1	0	1	0
Career total			198	12	16	1	25	2	239	15

== Managerial statistics ==
As of match played 6 June 2026

Managerial record by team and tenure
Team	Nat.	From	To	Record								Ref.
Team	Nat.	From	To	G	W	D	L	GF	GA	GD	Win %	Ref.
JEF United Chiba	(Japan)	25 July 2016	31 December 2016	20	7	5	8	25	24	+1	35.00	
Mito HollyHock	(Japan)	1 February 2018	31 January 2020	88	37	23	28	109	86	+23	42.05	
Avispa Fukuoka	(Japan)	1 February 2020	11 December 2024	230	100	58	72	268	233	+35	43.48	
Kawasaki Frontale	(Japan)	12 December 2024	Present	71	30	18	23	119	105	+14	42.25	
Career Total				409	174	104	131	521	448	+73	42.54	

== Honours ==
=== Manager ===
Avispa Fukuoka

- J.League Cup: 2023

Kawasaki Frontale

- AFC Champions League runner-up: 2024–25

Manager

- J.League Manager of the Year: 2023
