= Kiyomitsu Kobari =

Japanese footballer

Kiyomitsu Kobari 小針 清允
Personal information
- Full name: Kiyomitsu Kobari
- Date of birth: 12 June 1977 (age 49)
- Place of birth: Itabashi, Tokyo, Japan
- Height: 1.83 m (6 ft 0 in)
- Position: Goalkeeper

Youth career
- 1993–1995: Verdy Kawasaki

Senior career*
| Years | Team | Apps | (Gls) |
| 1996–2000 | Verdy Kawasaki | 4 | (0) |
| 2001 | Vissel Kobe | 1 | (0) |
| 2002–2007 | Vegalta Sendai | 68 | (0) |
| 2008–2009 | Tochigi SC | 63 | (0) |
| 2010–2014 | Gainare Tottori | 146 | (0) |
| Total | | 284 | (0) |

International career
| 1993 | Japan U-17 | 4 | (0) |
| 1997 | Japan U-20 | 1 | (0) |
Medal record
Verdy Kawasaki
| Runner-up | J.League Cup | 1996 |
| Winner | Emperor's Cup | 1996 |
- * Club domestic league appearances and goals

Kiyomitsu Kobari (小針 清允, Kobari Kiyomitsu; born 12 June 1977) is a former Japanese football player.

== Club career ==
Kobari was born in Itabashi, Tokyo on 12 June 1977. He joined the Verdy Kawasaki youth team in 1996. However he did not play much, less than Shinkichi Kikuchi and Kenji Honnami. He moved to Vissel Kobe in 2001 and Vegalta Sendai in 2002. At Vegalta, he competed with Daijiro Takakuwa for a position. He moved to the Japan Football League (JFL) club Tochigi SC in 2008. He played in all matches and the club was promoted to the J2 League. However, he played less often, in favor of Kunihiro Shibazaki, in late 2009. He moved to the JFL club Gainare Tottori in 2010. He played in all matches and the club won the championship and was promoted to the J2 League. He retired at the end of the 2014 season.

== National team career ==
In August 1993, Kobari was selected by the Japan U-17 national team for the 1993 U-17 World Championship. He played full-time in all four matches. In June 1997, he was also selected by the Japan U-20 national team for the 1997 World Youth Championship. He played in the first match against Spain.

== Club statistics ==
| Club performance | | | League | | Cup | | League Cup | | Total | |
| Season | Club | League | Apps | Goals | Apps | Goals | Apps | Goals | Apps | Goals |
| Japan | | | League | | Emperor's Cup | | J.League Cup | | Total | |
|---|---|---|---|---|---|---|---|---|---|---|
| 1996 | Verdy Kawasaki | J1 League | 0 | 0 | 0 | 0 | 0 | 0 | 0 | 0 |
| 1997 | Verdy Kawasaki | J1 League | 2 | 0 | 0 | 0 | 0 | 0 | 2 | 0 |
| 1998 | Verdy Kawasaki | J1 League | 0 | 0 | 0 | 0 | 0 | 0 | 0 | 0 |
| 1999 | Verdy Kawasaki | J1 League | 1 | 0 | 0 | 0 | 0 | 0 | 1 | 0 |
| 2000 | Verdy Kawasaki | J1 League | 1 | 0 | 0 | 0 | 5 | 0 | 6 | 0 |
| 2001 | Vissel Kobe | J1 League | 1 | 0 | 0 | 0 | 2 | 0 | 3 | 0 |
| 2002 | Vegalta Sendai | J1 League | 12 | 0 | 2 | 0 | 3 | 0 | 17 | 0 |
| 2003 | Vegalta Sendai | J1 League | 20 | 0 | 0 | 0 | 1 | 0 | 21 | 0 |
| 2004 | Vegalta Sendai | J2 League | 1 | 0 | 0 | 0 | - | | 1 | 0 |
| 2005 | Vegalta Sendai | J2 League | 1 | 0 | 2 | 0 | - | | 3 | 0 |
| 2006 | Vegalta Sendai | J2 League | 23 | 0 | 2 | 0 | - | | 25 | 0 |
| 2007 | Vegalta Sendai | J2 League | 11 | 0 | 0 | 0 | - | | 11 | 0 |
| 2008 | Tochigi SC | JFL | 34 | 0 | 2 | 0 | - | | 36 | 0 |
| 2009 | Tochigi SC | J2 League | 29 | 0 | 0 | 0 | - | | 29 | 0 |
| 2010 | Gainare Tottori | JFL | 34 | 0 | 1 | 0 | - | | 35 | 0 |
| 2011 | Gainare Tottori | J2 League | 32 | 0 | 1 | 0 | - | | 33 | 0 |
| 2012 | Gainare Tottori | J2 League | 39 | 0 | 2 | 0 | - | | 41 | 0 |
| 2013 | Gainare Tottori | J2 League | 20 | 0 | 1 | 0 | - | | 21 | 0 |
| 2014 | Gainare Tottori | J3 League | 21 | 0 | 1 | 0 | - | | 22 | 0 |
| Total | | | 282 | 0 | 14 | 0 | 11 | 0 | 307 | 0 |
