= Michiyasu Osada =

Japanese footballer

Michiyasu Osada 長田 道泰
Personal information
- Full name: Michiyasu Osada
- Date of birth: March 5, 1978 (age 48)
- Place of birth: Sayama, Saitama, Japan
- Height: 1.74 m (5 ft 8 1/2 in)
- Position: Midfielder

Youth career
- 1993–1995: Verdy Kawasaki

Senior career*
Years	Team	Apps	(Gls)
1996–1998	Verdy Kawasaki	10	(0)
1999–2000	Vissel Kobe	43	(7)
2001	Kyoto Purple Sanga	7	(0)
2002	Tokyo Verdy	7	(0)
2003–2004	Okinawa Kariyushi FC		
2004	Shizuoka FC		

International career
1993	Japan U-17	4	(0)
Medal record
Verdy Kawasaki
Runner-up	J.League Cup	1996
Winner	Emperor's Cup	1996
- * Club domestic league appearances and goals

Michiyasu Osada (長田 道泰, Osada Michiyasu; born March 5, 1978) is a former Japanese football player.

== Club career ==
Osada was born in Sayama on March 5, 1978. He joined Verdy Kawasaki (later Tokyo Verdy) from youth team in 1996. Although he debuted in 1997, his opportunity to play was small and he moved to Vissel Kobe in 1999. He played many matches at Vissel. He moved to Kyoto Purple Sanga in 2001. He returned to Tokyo Verdy in 2002. After that, he played for Regional Leagues club Okinawa Kariyushi FC and Shizuoka FC. He retired end of 2004 season.

== National team career ==
In August 1993, Osada was selected Japan U-17 national team for 1993 U-17 World Championship. He played full time in all 4 matches. In June 1997, he was also selected Japan U-20 national team for 1997 World Youth Championship, but he did not play in the match.

== Career statistics ==
Appearances and goals by club, season and competition
Club	Season	League			Emperor's Cup		J.League Cup		Total	
Club	Season	Division	Apps	Goals	Apps	Goals	Apps	Goals	Apps	Goals
Verdy Kawasaki	1996	J1 League	0	0	0	0	0	0	0	0
Verdy Kawasaki	1997	J1 League	5	0	0	0	0	0	5	0
Verdy Kawasaki	1998	J1 League	5	0	0	0	0	0	5	0
Vissel Kobe	1999	J1 League	22	4	1	0	2	0	25	4
Vissel Kobe	2000	J1 League	21	3	4	2	4	2	29	7
Kyoto Purple Sanga	2001	J2 League	7	0	2	0	0	0	9	0
Tokyo Verdy	2002	J1 League	7	0	0	0	0	0	7	0
Okinawa Kariyushi FC	2003	Regional Leagues	21	5	2	0	-		23	5
Okinawa Kariyushi FC	2004	Regional Leagues								
Shizuoka FC	2004	Regional Leagues								
Career total			88	12	9	2	6	2	103	16
