= Yasutoshi Miura =

Japanese footballer and manager (born 1965)

Yasutoshi Miura 三浦 泰年
Personal information
- Full name: Yasutoshi Miura
- Date of birth: 15 July 1965 (age 61)
- Place of birth: Shizuoka, Shizuoka Prefecture, Japan
- Height: 1.71 m (5 ft 7 in)
- Positions: Defender; midfielder

Youth career
- 1981–1983: Shizuoka Gakuen High School

Senior career*
Years	Team	Apps	(Gls)
1984–1985	Santos		
1986–1992	Yomiuri	82	(5)
1992–1995	Shimizu S-Pulse	104	(5)
1996–1998	Verdy Kawasaki	56	(1)
1999–2001	Avispa Fukuoka	74	(5)
2002–2003	Vissel Kobe	24	(0)
Total		340	(16)

International career
1993	Japan	3	(0)

Managerial career
- 2005: Vissel Kobe (caretaker)
- 2011–2012: Giravanz Kitakyushu
- 2013–2014: Tokyo Verdy
- 2015: Chiangmai
- 2016: Kataller Toyama
- 2017–2018: Kagoshima United FC
- 2021–2024: Atletico Suzuka
Medal record
Verdy Kawasaki
Winner	Japan Soccer League	1986/87
Winner	Japan Soccer League	1990/91
Winner	Japan Soccer League	1991/92
Runner-up	Japan Soccer League	1989/90
Winner	JSL Cup	1991
Runner-up	J.League Cup	1996
Winner	Emperor's Cup	1986
Winner	Emperor's Cup	1987
Winner	Emperor's Cup	1996
Runner-up	Emperor's Cup	1991
Shimizu S-Pulse
Runner-up	J.League Cup	1992
Runner-up	J.League Cup	1993
- * Club domestic league appearances and goals

Yasutoshi Miura (三浦 泰年, Miura Yasutoshi; born 15 July 1965) is a Japanese former football player and manager. He played for the Japan national team. He is the older brother of Kazuyoshi Miura.

== Club career ==
Miura was born in Shizuoka on 15 July 1965. After graduating from Shizuoka Gakuen High School, through Brazilian club Santos, he joined Yomiuri (later Verdy Kawasaki) in 1986. The club won the champions in Japan Soccer League 3 times, JSL Cup 1 times and Emperor's Cup 2 times. In Asia, the club also won 1987 Asian Club Championship. In 1992, moved to new club Shimizu S-Pulse based in his local Shizuoka in 1992. In 1996, he returned to Verdy Kawasaki. The club won 1996 Emperor's Cup. However his opportunity for play has decreased, he moved to Avispa Fukuoka in 1999. He played as regular player at the club. However the club was relegated to J2 League in 2001 and he moved to Vissel Kobe in 2002. He retired at the age of 38 in 2003.

== National team career ==
In October 1993, Miura was selected Japan national team. On 4 October 1993, he debuted for Japan national team against Ivory Coast. He played as left side-back on behalf of regular player Satoshi Tsunami could not play for injury. Miura also played at 1994 World Cup qualification. He played 3 games for Japan in 1993.

== Coaching career ==
After retirement, Miura became a manager for J2 League club Giravanz Kitakyushu in 2011. Although Giravanz was at the bottom place in 2010 season, Miura led Giravanz to 8th place in 2011 season. In 2012 season, Giravanz finished at 9th place. In 2013, he moved to J2 club Tokyo Verdy which Miura played long time. However the club results were bad and Miura was sacked in September 2014 when the club was at the 20th place of 22 clubs. In 2015, Miura moved to Thailand and signed with Chiangmai. However he was sacked for poor performance in July. In 2016, he signed with J3 League club Kataller Toyama. He moved to J3 club Kagoshima United FC in 2017. In 2018, he led the club to the 2nd place and the club was promoted to J2 first time in the club history. However he resigned end of 2018 season. On 15 July 2021, he was appointed as manager at Suzuka Point Getters.

== Club statistics ==
Club performance			League		Cup		League Cup		Total	
Season	Club	League	Apps	Goals	Apps	Goals	Apps	Goals	Apps	Goals
Japan			League		Emperor's Cup		J.League Cup		Total	
1986/87	Yomiuri	JSL Division 1	6	1	1	0	4	0	11	1
1987/88	Yomiuri	JSL Division 1	13	1	1	0	4	0	18	1
1988/89	Yomiuri	JSL Division 1	15	2	3	0	3	0	21	2
1989/90	Yomiuri	JSL Division 1	19	0	3	0	4	0	26	0
1990/91	Yomiuri	JSL Division 1	22	1	2	0	2	0	26	1
1991/92	Yomiuri	JSL Division 1	7	0	5	0	5	0	17	0
1992	Shimizu S-Pulse	J1 League	-		2	1	11	0	13	1
1993	Shimizu S-Pulse	J1 League	19	1	4	0	4	0	27	1
1994	Shimizu S-Pulse	J1 League	37	2	1	0	1	0	39	2
1995	Shimizu S-Pulse	J1 League	48	2	1	0	-		49	2
1996	Verdy Kawasaki	J1 League	19	1	5	2	15	0	39	3
1997	Verdy Kawasaki	J1 League	21	0	1	0	5	0	27	0
1998	Verdy Kawasaki	J1 League	16	0	2	0	2	1	20	1
1999	Avispa Fukuoka	J1 League	23	4	2	1	3	0	28	5
2000	Avispa Fukuoka	J1 League	25	1	2	1	1	0	28	2
2001	Avispa Fukuoka	J1 League	26	0	1	0	4	0	31	0
2002	Vissel Kobe	J1 League	7	0	1	0	1	0	9	0
2003	Vissel Kobe	J1 League	17	0	0	0	5	0	22	0
Total			340	16	43	5	68	1	451	22

== National team statistics ==
Japan national team
Year	Apps	Goals
1993	3	0
Total	3	0

== Managerial statistics ==
Team	From	To	Record				
Team	From	To	G	W	D	L	Win %
Giravanz Kitakyushu	2011	2012	80	35	17	28	43.75
Tokyo Verdy	2013	2014	73	20	23	30	27.40
Kataller Toyama	2016	2016	30	13	10	7	43.33
Kagoshima United FC	2017	2018	64	33	13	18	51.56
Total			247	101	63	83	40.89
