= 2000 Verdy Kawasaki season =

Verdy Kawasaki
2000 season
- Manager: Chang Woe-Ryong
- Stadium: Todoroki Athletics Stadium
- J.League 1: 10th
- Emperor's Cup: 4th Round
- J.League Cup: Quarterfinals
- Top goalscorer: Kim Hyun-Seok (16)
Home colours	Away colours

2000 Verdy Kawasaki season

== Competitions ==
Competitions	Position
J.League 1	10th / 16 clubs
Emperor's Cup	4th round
J.League Cup	Quarterfinals

== Domestic results ==
=== J.League 1 ===
11 March 2000 1-1	Verdy Kawasaki	2-1	Gamba Osaka	Todoroki Athletics Stadium
JST (UTC+09)

18 March 2000 1-2	Kashiwa Reysol	1-0	Verdy Kawasaki	Hitachi Kashiwa Soccer Stadium
JST (UTC+09)

25 March 2000 1-3	Cerezo Osaka	5-2	Verdy Kawasaki	Osaka Nagai Stadium
JST (UTC+09)

1 April 2000 1-4	Verdy Kawasaki	0-1	JEF United Ichihara	Todoroki Athletics Stadium
JST (UTC+09)

5 April 2000 1-5	Avispa Fukuoka	0-2	Verdy Kawasaki	Hakatanomori Football Stadium
JST (UTC+09)

8 April 2000 1-6	Verdy Kawasaki	1-3	Yokohama F. Marinos	Tokyo National Stadium
JST (UTC+09)

15 April 2000 1-7	Vissel Kobe	1-2 (GG) (a.e.t.)	Verdy Kawasaki	Kobe Universiade Memorial Stadium
JST (UTC+09)

22 April 2000 1-8	Verdy Kawasaki	2-0	Kawasaki Frontale	Todoroki Athletics Stadium
JST (UTC+09)

29 April 2000 1-9	Verdy Kawasaki	2-3 (GG) (a.e.t.)	Júbilo Iwata	Niigata City Athletic Stadium
JST (UTC+09)

3 May 2000 1-10	Kashima Antlers	0-3	Verdy Kawasaki	Kashima Soccer Stadium
JST (UTC+09)

6 May 2000 1-11	Verdy Kawasaki	2-3 (GG) (a.e.t.)	Nagoya Grampus Eight	Tokyo National Stadium
JST (UTC+09)

13 May 2000 1-12	Sanfrecce Hiroshima	2-1 (GG) (a.e.t.)	Verdy Kawasaki	Hiroshima Big Arch
JST (UTC+09)

17 May 2000 1-13	Verdy Kawasaki	1-1 (GG) (a.e.t.)	Kyoto Purple Sanga	Tokyo National Stadium
JST (UTC+09)

20 May 2000 1-14	Shimizu S-Pulse	2-3 (GG) (a.e.t.)	Verdy Kawasaki	Nihondaira Sports Stadium
JST (UTC+09)

27 May 2000 1-15	Verdy Kawasaki	3-0	FC Tokyo	Todoroki Athletics Stadium
JST (UTC+09)

24 June 2000 2-1	Gamba Osaka	2-1	Verdy Kawasaki	Osaka Expo '70 Stadium
JST (UTC+09)

1 July 2000 2-2	Verdy Kawasaki	1-0	Kashiwa Reysol	Todoroki Athletics Stadium
JST (UTC+09)

8 July 2000 2-3	Nagoya Grampus Eight	2-2 (GG) (a.e.t.)	Verdy Kawasaki	Mizuho Athletic Stadium
JST (UTC+09)

15 July 2000 2-4	Verdy Kawasaki	0-2	Kashima Antlers	Tokyo National Stadium
JST (UTC+09)

22 July 2000 2-5	Júbilo Iwata	2-0	Verdy Kawasaki	Júbilo Iwata Stadium
JST (UTC+09)

26 July 2000 2-6	Kawasaki Frontale	0-0 (GG) (a.e.t.)	Verdy Kawasaki	Todoroki Athletics Stadium
JST (UTC+09)

29 July 2000 2-7	Verdy Kawasaki	1-2	Vissel Kobe	Todoroki Athletics Stadium
JST (UTC+09)

5 August 2000 2-8	JEF United Ichihara	1-4	Verdy Kawasaki	Yamagata Park Stadium
JST (UTC+09)

12 August 2000 2-9	Verdy Kawasaki	1-0	Cerezo Osaka	Todoroki Athletics Stadium
JST (UTC+09)

19 August 2000 2-10	Yokohama F. Marinos	3-2	Verdy Kawasaki	Yokohama Mitsuzawa Stadium
JST (UTC+09)

8 November 2000 2-11	Verdy Kawasaki	0-0 (GG) (a.e.t.)	Avispa Fukuoka	Todoroki Athletics Stadium
JST (UTC+09)

11 November 2000 2-12	FC Tokyo	2-3	Verdy Kawasaki	Komazawa Olympic Park Stadium
JST (UTC+09)

18 November 2000 2-13	Verdy Kawasaki	2-0	Shimizu S-Pulse	Suizenji Stadium
JST (UTC+09)

23 November 2000 2-14	Kyoto Purple Sanga	3-2	Verdy Kawasaki	Nishikyogoku Athletic Stadium
JST (UTC+09)

26 November 2000 2-15	Verdy Kawasaki	1-2 (GG) (a.e.t.)	Sanfrecce Hiroshima	Todoroki Athletics Stadium
JST (UTC+09)

=== Emperor's Cup ===
1st Round	bye

2nd Round	bye

10 December 2000 3rd Round	Verdy Kawasaki	2-1	Albirex Niigata	Hiratsuka Athletics Stadium
JST (UTC+09)

17 December 2000 4th Round	Verdy Kawasaki	0-2	Kashima Antlers	Tosu Stadium
JST (UTC+09)

=== J.League Cup ===
12 April 2000 1st Round-1	Sagan Tosu	0-1	Verdy Kawasaki	Tosu Stadium
JST (UTC+09)

19 April 2000 1st Round-2	Verdy Kawasaki	2-1 (3-1 agg.)	Sagan Tosu	Todoroki Athletics Stadium
JST (UTC+09)

5 July 2000 2nd Round-1	Cerezo Osaka	0-1	Verdy Kawasaki	Osaka Nagai Stadium
JST (UTC+09)

12 July 2000 2nd Round-2	Verdy Kawasaki	1-0 (2-0 agg.)	Cerezo Osaka	Todoroki Athletics Stadium
JST (UTC+09)

30 August 2000 Quarterfinals-1	Verdy Kawasaki	0-0	Kawasaki Frontale	Todoroki Athletics Stadium
JST (UTC+09)

6 September 2000 Quarterfinals-2	Kawasaki Frontale	2-0 (2-0 agg.)	Verdy Kawasaki	Todoroki Athletics Stadium
JST (UTC+09)

== Player statistics ==
No.	Pos.	Nat.	Player	D.o.B. (Age)	Height / Weight	J.League 1		Emperor's Cup		J.League Cup		Total	
No.	Pos.	Nat.	Player	D.o.B. (Age)	Height / Weight	Apps	Goals	Apps	Goals	Apps	Goals	Apps	Goals
1	GK	(Japan)	Yoshinari Takagi	May 20, 1979 (aged 20)	cm / kg	0	0						
2	DF	(Japan)	Takuya Yamada	August 24, 1974 (aged 25)	cm / kg	30	4						
3	DF	(Japan)	Yusuke Mori	July 24, 1980 (aged 19)	cm / kg	5	0						
4	MF	(Japan)	Kentaro Hayashi	August 29, 1972 (aged 27)	cm / kg	27	6						
5	DF	(Japan)	Atsushi Yoneyama	November 20, 1976 (aged 23)	cm / kg	30	1						
6	DF	(Japan)	Kazuyoshi Mikami	August 29, 1975 (aged 24)	cm / kg	26	1						
7	MF	(Japan)	Yoshiyuki Kobayashi	January 27, 1978 (aged 22)	cm / kg	11	0						
8	MF	(Japan)	Tsuyoshi Kitazawa	August 10, 1968 (aged 31)	cm / kg	4	0						
9	FW	(Japan)	Hayato Yano	October 29, 1980 (aged 19)	cm / kg	1	0						
10	FW	(South Korea)	Kim Hyun-Seok	May 5, 1967 (aged 32)	cm / kg	25	16						
11	MF	(Japan)	Teruo Iwamoto	May 2, 1972 (aged 27)	cm / kg	9	0						
12	GK	(Japan)	Kiyomitsu Kobari	June 12, 1977 (aged 22)	cm / kg	1	0						
13	FW	(Japan)	Keiji Ishizuka	August 26, 1974 (aged 25)	cm / kg	29	6						
14	MF	(Japan)	Yuji Hironaga	July 25, 1975 (aged 24)	cm / kg	24	2						
15	DF	(Japan)	Koichi Sugiyama	October 27, 1971 (aged 28)	cm / kg	25	0						
16	FW	(Japan)	Naoto Sakurai	September 2, 1975 (aged 24)	cm / kg	17	0						
17	DF	(Japan)	Yoshihiro Nishida	January 30, 1973 (aged 27)	cm / kg	12	0						
18	FW	(Japan)	Nobuhiro Takeda	May 10, 1967 (aged 32)	cm / kg	0	0						
19	GK	(Japan)	Hiroki Kobayashi	May 24, 1977 (aged 22)	cm / kg	0	0						
20	FW	(Japan)	Kazunori Iio	February 23, 1982 (aged 18)	cm / kg	26	4						
21	GK	(Japan)	Kenji Honnami	June 23, 1964 (aged 35)	cm / kg	29	0						
22	DF	(Japan)	Yuji Nakazawa	February 25, 1978 (aged 22)	cm / kg	29	4						
23	MF	(Japan)	Shinya Osada	September 26, 1980 (aged 19)	cm / kg	0	0						
23	MF	(South Korea)	Kim Do-Keun	March 2, 1972 (aged 28)	cm / kg	14	0						
24	DF	(Japan)	Yosuke Ikehata	June 7, 1979 (aged 20)	cm / kg	4	0						
25	FW	(Japan)	Kazuki Hiramoto	August 18, 1981 (aged 18)	cm / kg	9	1						
26	GK	(Japan)	Kyohei Noda	October 6, 1981 (aged 18)	cm / kg	0	0						
32	DF	(Japan)	Toshimi Kikuchi	June 17, 1973 (aged 26)	cm / kg	5	0						
33	DF	(Japan)	Osamu Umeyama	August 16, 1973 (aged 26)	cm / kg	9	0						
34	MF	(Japan)	Hiromasa Suguri	July 29, 1976 (aged 23)	cm / kg	3	0						
35	MF	(Brazil)	Reinaldo	December 28, 1976 (aged 23)	cm / kg	0	0						
36	FW	(North Korea)	Ryang Gyu-Sa	June 3, 1978 (aged 21)	cm / kg	0	0						
