= Kenichiro Tokura =

Japanese footballer

Kenichiro Tokura 戸倉 健一郎
Personal information
- Full name: Kenichiro Tokura
- Date of birth: May 31, 1971 (age 55)
- Place of birth: Kanagawa, Japan
- Height: 1.70 m (5 ft 7 in)
- Position: Defender

Youth career
- 1987–1989: Toin Gakuen High School
- 1990–1993: Aoyama Gakuin University

Senior career*
Years	Team	Apps	(Gls)
1994–1996	Verdy Kawasaki	39	(0)
1997	Kawasaki Frontale	20	(0)
1998	Gamba Osaka	5	(0)
1999	Kyoto Purple Sanga	10	(0)
1999	Verdy Kawasaki	2	(0)
2001	Shonan Bellmare	15	(0)
Total		91	(0)
Medal record
Verdy Kawasaki
Winner	J1 League	1994
Runner-up	J1 League	1995
Winner	J.League Cup	1994
Runner-up	J.League Cup	1996
Winner	Emperor's Cup	1996
- * Club domestic league appearances and goals

Kenichiro Tokura (戸倉 健一郎, Tokura Kenichiro; born May 31, 1971) is a former Japanese football player.

== Playing career ==
Tokura was born in Kanagawa Prefecture on May 31, 1971. After graduating from Aoyama Gakuin University, he joined Verdy Kawasaki in 1994. He played many matches as left side back from first season. The club also won the champions 1994 J1 League and 1994 J.League Cup. However his opportunity to play decreased in 1996. In 1997, he moved to Japan Football League club Kawasaki Frontale and he played many matches. In 1998, he moved to Gamba Osaka. However he could hardly play in the match. In 1999, he moved to Kyoto Purple Sanga and he played as regular player as left side back. In July, he returned to Verdy Kawasaki. However he could hardly play in the match and left the club end of 1999 season. After 1 season blank, he joined J2 League club Shonan Bellmare and played in 1 season. He retired at the end of the 2001 season.

== Career statistics ==
Appearances and goals by club, season and competition
Club	Season	League			Emperor's Cup		J.League Cup		Total	
Club	Season	Division	Apps	Goals	Apps	Goals	Apps	Goals	Apps	Goals
Verdy Kawasaki	1994	J1 League	11	0	0	0	3	0	14	0
Verdy Kawasaki	1995	J1 League	21	0	1	0	—		22	0
Verdy Kawasaki	1996	J1 League	7	0	0	0	0	0	7	0
Kawasaki Frontale	1997	Football League	20	0	0	0	—		20	0
Gamba Osaka	1998	J1 League	5	0	0	0	0	0	5	0
Kyoto Purple Sanga	1999	J1 League	10	0	0	0	1	0	11	0
Verdy Kawasaki	1999	J1 League	2	0	2	0	0	0	4	0
Shonan Bellmare	2001	J2 League	15	0	0	0	2	0	17	0
Career total			91	0	3	0	6	0	80	0
