= 1998 Verdy Kawasaki season =

Verdy Kawasaki
1998 season
- Manager: Nicanor; Ryoichi Kawakatsu
- Stadium: Todoroki Athletics Stadium
- J.League: 12th
- Emperor's Cup: Quarterfinals
- J.League Cup: GL-A 3rd
- Top goalscorer: Euller (12)
Home colours	Away colours

1998 Verdy Kawasaki season

== Competitions ==
Competitions	Position
J.League	12th / 18 clubs
Emperor's Cup	Quarterfinals
J.League Cup	GL-A 3rd / 5 clubs

== Domestic results ==
=== J.League ===
21 March 1998 1-1	Bellmare Hiratsuka	4-1	Verdy Kawasaki	Hiratsuka Athletics Stadium
JST (UTC+09)

25 March 1998 1-2	Verdy Kawasaki	1-0	Júbilo Iwata	Tokyo National Stadium
JST (UTC+09)

28 March 1998 1-3	Kyoto Purple Sanga	0-2	Verdy Kawasaki	Nishikyogoku Athletic Stadium
JST (UTC+09)

4 April 1998 1-4	Vissel Kobe	0-2	Verdy Kawasaki	Kobe Universiade Memorial Stadium
JST (UTC+09)

11 April 1998 1-5	Verdy Kawasaki	2-1	JEF United Ichihara	Todoroki Athletics Stadium
JST (UTC+09)

15 April 1998 1-6	Yokohama Flügels	0-2	Verdy Kawasaki	Yokohama Mitsuzawa Stadium
JST (UTC+09)

18 April 1998 1-7	Verdy Kawasaki	2-1	Cerezo Osaka	Todoroki Athletics Stadium
JST (UTC+09)

25 April 1998 1-8	Sanfrecce Hiroshima	2-1 (GG) (a.e.t.)	Verdy Kawasaki	Hiroshima Stadium
JST (UTC+09)

29 April 1998 1-9	Verdy Kawasaki	6-1	Avispa Fukuoka	Todoroki Athletics Stadium
JST (UTC+09)

2 May 1998 1-10	Consadole Sapporo	1-3	Verdy Kawasaki	Muroran Irie Stadium
JST (UTC+09)

5 May 1998 1-11	Verdy Kawasaki	2-0	Shimizu S-Pulse	Todoroki Athletics Stadium
JST (UTC+09)

9 May 1998 1-12	Kashima Antlers	3-1	Verdy Kawasaki	Kashima Soccer Stadium
JST (UTC+09)

25 July 1998 1-13	Verdy Kawasaki	1-3	Kashiwa Reysol	Todoroki Athletics Stadium
JST (UTC+09)

29 July 1998 1-14	Gamba Osaka	2-4	Verdy Kawasaki	Ishikawa Kanazawa Stadium
JST (UTC+09)

1 August 1998 1-15	Verdy Kawasaki	2-4	Yokohama Marinos	Todoroki Athletics Stadium
JST (UTC+09)

5 August 1998 1-16	Urawa Red Diamonds	1-1 (GG) (a.e.t.) (4-2 p)	Verdy Kawasaki	Urawa Komaba Stadium
JST (UTC+09)

8 August 1998 1-17	Verdy Kawasaki	0-2	Nagoya Grampus Eight	Todoroki Athletics Stadium
JST (UTC+09)

22 August 1998 2-1	Verdy Kawasaki	1-2	Gamba Osaka	Todoroki Athletics Stadium
JST (UTC+09)

29 August 1998 2-2	Yokohama Marinos	2-0	Verdy Kawasaki	International Stadium Yokohama
JST (UTC+09)

5 September 1998 2-3	Verdy Kawasaki	0-3	Urawa Red Diamonds	Tokyo National Stadium
JST (UTC+09)

12 September 1998 2-4	Nagoya Grampus Eight	1-0	Verdy Kawasaki	Gifu Nagaragawa Stadium
JST (UTC+09)

15 September 1998 2-5	Verdy Kawasaki	3-2	Bellmare Hiratsuka	Niigata City Athletic Stadium
JST (UTC+09)

19 September 1998 2-6	Júbilo Iwata	1-0	Verdy Kawasaki	Júbilo Iwata Stadium
JST (UTC+09)

23 September 1998 2-7	Verdy Kawasaki	0-2	Kyoto Purple Sanga	Tokyo National Stadium
JST (UTC+09)

26 September 1998 2-8	Verdy Kawasaki	1-2	Vissel Kobe	Todoroki Athletics Stadium
JST (UTC+09)

3 October 1998 2-9	JEF United Ichihara	0-2	Verdy Kawasaki	Tokyo National Stadium
JST (UTC+09)

14 October 1998 2-10	Verdy Kawasaki	0-3	Yokohama Flügels	Tokyo National Stadium
JST (UTC+09)

17 October 1998 2-11	Cerezo Osaka	1-2	Verdy Kawasaki	Osaka Nagai Stadium
JST (UTC+09)

21 October 1998 2-12	Verdy Kawasaki	0-1	Sanfrecce Hiroshima	Todoroki Athletics Stadium
JST (UTC+09)

24 October 1998 2-13	Avispa Fukuoka	2-1	Verdy Kawasaki	Hakatanomori Football Stadium
JST (UTC+09)

31 October 1998 2-14	Verdy Kawasaki	1-2	Consadole Sapporo	Todoroki Athletics Stadium
JST (UTC+09)

3 November 1998 2-15	Nihondaira Sports Stadium	0-0 (GG) (a.e.t.) (4-2 p)	Verdy Kawasaki	Nihondaira Sports Stadium
JST (UTC+09)

7 November 1998 2-16	Verdy Kawasaki	1-2 (GG) (a.e.t.)	Kashima Antlers	Todoroki Athletics Stadium
JST (UTC+09)

14 November 1998 2-17	Kashiwa Reysol	2-1	Verdy Kawasaki	Hitachi Kashiwa Soccer Stadium
JST (UTC+09)

=== Emperor's Cup ===
1st Round	bye

2nd Round	bye

13 December 1998 3rd Round	Verdy Kawasaki	1-0	Oita Trinita	Todoroki Athletics Stadium
JST (UTC+09)

20 December 1998 4th Round	Honda	1-3	Verdy Kawasaki	Gifu Nagaragawa Stadium
JST (UTC+09)

23 December 1998 Quarterfinals	Nagoya Grampus Eight	2-1 (GG) (a.e.t.)	Verdy Kawasaki	Kagoshima Kamoike Stadium
JST (UTC+09)

=== J.League Cup ===
16 May 1998 GL-A-1	Sanfrecce Hiroshima	1-3	Verdy Kawasaki	Tottori Soccer Stadium
JST (UTC+09)

23 May 1998 GL-A-2	Urawa Red Diamonds	1-1	Verdy Kawasaki	Urawa Komaba Stadium
JST (UTC+09)

30 May 1998 GL-A-3	Verdy Kawasaki	1-2	Júbilo Iwata	Tokyo National Stadium
JST (UTC+09)

GL-A-4	bye

6 June 1998 GL-A-5	Verdy Kawasaki	1-0	Brummel Sendai	Todoroki Athletics Stadium
JST (UTC+09)

== Player statistics ==
No.	Pos.	Nat.	Player	D.o.B. (Age)	Height / Weight	J.League		Emperor's Cup		J.League Cup		Total	
No.	Pos.	Nat.	Player	D.o.B. (Age)	Height / Weight	Apps	Goals	Apps	Goals	Apps	Goals	Apps	Goals
1	GK	(Japan)	Shinkichi Kikuchi	April 12, 1967 (aged 30)	cm / kg	33	0						
2	MF	(Brazil)	Moacir	March 21, 1970 (aged 28)	cm / kg	26	0						
3	DF	(Brazil)	Henrique	March 15, 1966 (aged 32)	cm / kg	20	0						
4	MF	(Japan)	Kentaro Hayashi	August 29, 1972 (aged 25)	cm / kg	3	0						
4	DF	(Brazil)	Daniel	May 27, 1973 (aged 24)	cm / kg	5	0						
5	DF	(Japan)	Tetsuji Hashiratani	July 15, 1964 (aged 33)	cm / kg	28	1						
6	DF	(Japan)	Tadashi Nakamura	June 10, 1971 (aged 26)	cm / kg	31	1						
7	MF	(Japan)	Masakiyo Maezono	October 29, 1973 (aged 24)	cm / kg	22	3						
8	MF	(Japan)	Tsuyoshi Kitazawa	August 10, 1968 (aged 29)	cm / kg	34	5						
9	FW	(Brazil)	Euller	March 15, 1971 (aged 27)	cm / kg	16	12						
10	MF	(Japan)	Ruy Ramos	February 9, 1957 (aged 41)	cm / kg	29	0						
11	FW	(Japan)	Kazuyoshi Miura	February 26, 1967 (aged 31)	cm / kg	28	5						
12	MF	(Japan)	Keisuke Kurihara	May 20, 1973 (aged 24)	cm / kg	0	0						
12	FW	(Brazil)	Fernando	October 5, 1977 (aged 20)	cm / kg	10	5						
13	MF	(Japan)	Nobuyuki Zaizen	October 19, 1976 (aged 21)	cm / kg	0	0						
14	MF	(Cameroon)	Edwin Ifeanyi	April 28, 1972 (aged 25)	cm / kg	2	0						
15	DF	(Japan)	Yasutoshi Miura	July 15, 1965 (aged 32)	cm / kg	16	0						
16	DF	(Japan)	Toshimi Kikuchi	June 17, 1973 (aged 24)	cm / kg	9	0						
17	MF	(Japan)	Takayuki Yamaguchi	August 1, 1973 (aged 24)	cm / kg	15	2						
18	FW	(Japan)	Takuya Takagi	November 12, 1967 (aged 30)	cm / kg	22	9						
19	GK	(Japan)	Kiyomitsu Kobari	June 12, 1977 (aged 20)	cm / kg	0	0						
20	FW	(Japan)	Keiji Ishizuka	August 26, 1974 (aged 23)	cm / kg	10	1						
21	GK	(Japan)	Kenji Honnami	June 23, 1964 (aged 33)	cm / kg	1	0						
22	DF	(Japan)	Takuya Yamada	August 24, 1974 (aged 23)	cm / kg	7	0						
23	DF	(Japan)	Atsushi Yoneyama	November 20, 1976 (aged 21)	cm / kg	15	0						
24	FW	(Japan)	Shintetsu Gen	September 17, 1973 (aged 24)	cm / kg	2	0						
25	MF	(Japan)	Tomo Sugawara	June 3, 1976 (aged 21)	cm / kg	12	1						
26	GK	(Japan)	Takaya Oishi	July 7, 1972 (aged 25)	cm / kg	0	0						
27	MF	(Japan)	Michiyasu Osada	March 5, 1978 (aged 20)	cm / kg	5	0						
28	DF	(Japan)	Yukio Tsuchiya	July 31, 1974 (aged 23)	cm / kg	14	0						
29	MF	(Japan)	Narita Takaki	April 5, 1977 (aged 20)	cm / kg	0	0						
30	FW	(Japan)	Mitsunori Yabuta	May 2, 1976 (aged 21)	cm / kg	11	0						
31	MF	(Japan)	Masakazu Senuma	September 7, 1978 (aged 19)	cm / kg	3	0						
32	MF	(Japan)	Kosaku Masuda	April 30, 1976 (aged 21)	cm / kg	3	0						
33	FW	(Japan)	Hiroaki Tanaka	April 17, 1979 (aged 18)	cm / kg	0	0						
34	DF	(Japan)	Yukinori Shigeta	July 15, 1976 (aged 21)	cm / kg	2	0						
35	MF	(Japan)	Toshiki Kushima	April 22, 1979 (aged 18)	cm / kg	0	0						
38	MF	(Japan)	Junichi Watanabe	May 20, 1973 (aged 24)	cm / kg	5	0						

== Other pages ==
- (in Japanese) J.League official site
