= Magrão (footballer, born 1974) =

Brazilian footballer

Personal information
- Full name: Giuliano Tadeo Aranda
- Date of birth: 21 February 1974 (age 52)
- Place of birth: Santo André, Brazil
- Height: 1.92 m (6 ft 3 1/2 in)
- Position: Striker

Senior career*
Years	Team	Apps	(Gls)
1992–1994	Palmeiras		
1995	Goiás		
1996	Coritiba		
1996–1997	Verdy Kawasaki		
1998	Palmeiras		
1999	Badajoz		
1999	Grêmio		
2000	Botafogo		
2001	São Caetano		
2002–2004	Gamba Osaka		
- * Club domestic league appearances and goals

Giuliano Tadeo Aranda, better known as Magrão (born 21 February 1974), is a former Brazilian football player.

Magrão played for several clubs in Brazil during his playing career. He also had a brief spell in the Spanish Segunda División with CD Badajoz. He finished his playing career with J. League side Gamba Osaka.

== Club statistics ==
Club performance			League		Cup		League Cup		Total	
Season	Club	League	Apps	Goals	Apps	Goals	Apps	Goals	Apps	Goals
Brazil			League		Copa do Brasil		League Cup		Total	
1992	Palmeiras	Série A	5	1					5	1
1993	Palmeiras	Série A	1	0					1	0
1994	Palmeiras	Série A	2	0					2	0
1995	Goiás	Série A	13	10					13	10
1996	Coritiba	Série A	0	0					0	0
Japan			League		Emperor's Cup		League Cup		Total	
1996	Verdy Kawasaki	J1 League	14	13	3	1	6	2	23	16
1997	Verdy Kawasaki	J1 League	9	6	0	0	4	0	13	6
Brazil			League		Copa do Brasil		League Cup		Total	
1998	Palmeiras	Série A	11	1					11	1
Spain			League		Copa del Rey		Supercopa de España		Total	
1998/99	Badajoz	Segunda División	5	0					5	0
Brazil			League		Copa do Brasil		League Cup		Total	
1999	Grêmio	Série A	14	5					14	5
2000	Botafogo	Série A	15	1					15	1
2001	São Caetano	Série A	23	11					23	11
Japan			League		Emperor's Cup		League Cup		Total	
2002	Gamba Osaka	J1 League	29	22	2	1	8	6	39	29
2003	Gamba Osaka	J1 League	24	15	2	1	4	2	30	18
2004	Gamba Osaka	J1 League	10	5	0	0	5	1	15	6
Total	Brazil		73	28					73	28
Total	Japan		86	61	7	3	27	11	120	75
Total	Spain		5	0					5	0
Career total			164	89	7	3	27	11	198	103
