= Junichi Kawamura =

Japanese footballer

Junichi Kawamura 川村 淳一
Personal information
- Full name: Junichi Kawamura
- Date of birth: June 24, 1980 (age 46)
- Place of birth: Numazu, Shizuoka, Japan
- Height: 1.68 m (5 ft 6 in)
- Position: Forward

Youth career
- 1996–1998: Tokai University Daiichi High School

Senior career*
Years	Team	Apps	(Gls)
1999–2001	Vissel Kobe	0	(0)
2002–2003	Jatco	38	(1)
2004	FC Eastern		
2005–2014	Azul Claro Numazu		
Total		38	(1)
- * Club domestic league appearances and goals

Junichi Kawamura (川村 淳一, Kawamura Jun'ichi; born June 24, 1980) is a former Japanese football player.

== Playing career ==
Kawamura was born in Numazu on June 24, 1980. After graduating from high school, he joined J1 League club Vissel Kobe. On April 12, 2000, he debuted in J.League Cup (v Omiya Ardija). In 2002, he moved to Japan Football League (JFL) club Jatco. However the club was disbanded end of 2003 season. He moved to Prefectural Leagues club FC Eastern in 2004, and to Prefectural Leagues club Numazu Koryo Club (later Azul Claro Numazu) in 2005. The club was promoted to Regional Leagues in 2012 and JFL in 2014. In 2014, he was retired.

== Career statistics ==
Appearances and goals by club, season and competition
Club	Season	League			Emperor's Cup		J.League Cup		Total	
Club	Season	Division	Apps	Goals	Apps	Goals	Apps	Goals	Apps	Goals
Vissel Kobe	1999	J1 League	0	0			0	0	0	0
Vissel Kobe	2000	J1 League	0	0			1	0	1	0
Vissel Kobe	2001	J1 League	0	0			0	0	0	0
Jatco	2002	Football League	13	0	—		—		13	0
Jatco	2003	Football League	25	1	—		—		25	1
Career total			38	1	0	0	1	0	39	1
