= Tsuyoshi Kitazawa =

Japanese footballer and television commentator

Tsuyoshi Kitazawa 北澤 豪
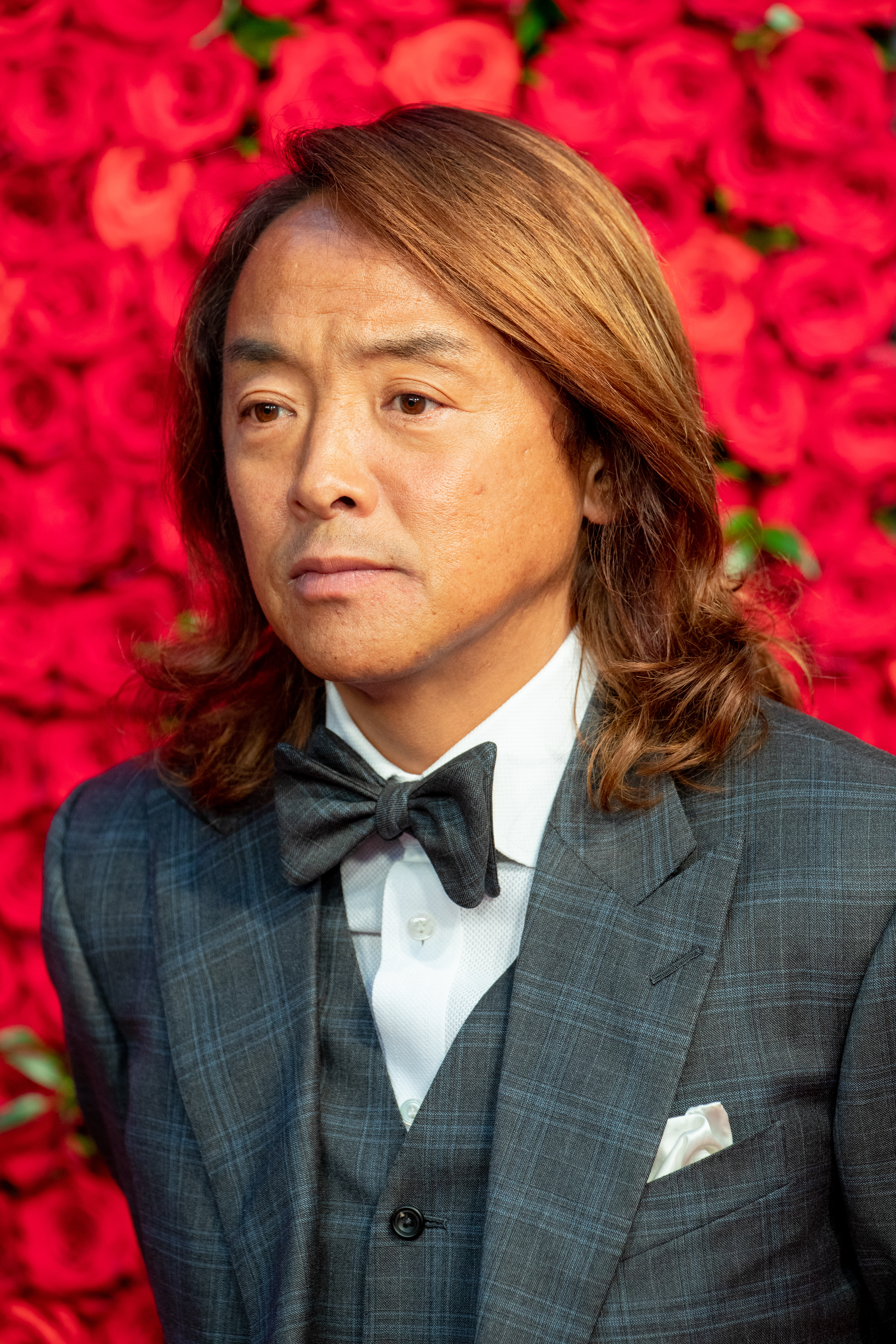

Personal information
- Full name: Tsuyoshi Kitazawa
- Date of birth: 10 August 1968 (age 58)
- Place of birth: Machida, Tokyo, Japan
- Height: 1.70 m (5 ft 7 in)
- Position: Midfielder

Youth career
- 1984–1986: Shutoku High School

Senior career*
Years	Team	Apps	(Gls)
1987–1991	Honda	51	(14)
1991–2002	Tokyo Verdy	265	(41)
Total		316	(55)

International career
1989	Japan Futsal		
1991–1999	Japan	58	(3)
Medal record
Tokyo Verdy
Winner	Japan Soccer League	1991/92
Winner	J1 League	1993
Winner	J1 League	1994
Runner-up	J1 League	1995
Winner	JSL Cup	1991
Winner	J.League Cup	1992
Winner	J.League Cup	1993
Winner	J.League Cup	1994
Runner-up	J.League Cup	1996
Winner	Emperor's Cup	1996
Runner-up	Emperor's Cup	1991
Runner-up	Emperor's Cup	1992
Representing Japan
AFC Asian Cup
Gold medal – first place	1992 Japan
- * Club domestic league appearances and goals

Tsuyoshi Kitazawa (北澤 豪, Kitazawa Tsuyoshi; born 10 August 1968) is a Japanese former football player who played for the Japan national team. He currently works on television as a football commentator.

== Club career ==
When Kitazawa was a junior high school student, he joined Yomiuri Club Junior Youth after a one-week trial. After graduating from junior high school, he chose to attend Shutoku High School, where he played for the school football club. After graduating, he joined Japan Soccer League side Honda in 1987. He was the league's joint top scorer in the 1990–91 season.

He transferred to Yomiuri Club (later Verdy Kawasaki, now Tokyo Verdy) in 1991. He became a key member of Verdy's successful early-1990s side, playing alongside Kazuyoshi Miura, Ruy Ramos, Nobuhiro Takeda, Tetsuji Hashiratani and, from 1993, Bismarck. Verdy won consecutive J.League championships in 1993 and 1994, as well as three consecutive J.League Cup titles from 1992 to 1994. Kitazawa remained with Verdy until retiring in 2002.

== National team career ==
Kitazawa earned 58 caps and scored 3 goals for the Japan national team between 1991 and 1999. He made his international debut on 2 June 1991 in a friendly against Thailand, under national coach Kenzo Yokoyama. He was a member of the Japan team that won the 1992 Asian Cup. He scored his first international goal on 6 November 1992 in the semifinal against China at Hiroshima Stadium.

He took part in Japan's unsuccessful campaign to qualify for the 1994 FIFA World Cup, appearing in two matches during the final Asian qualifying round in Doha, Qatar. He was an unused substitute in the final qualifier against Iraq, when an injury-time equaliser denied Japan qualification for the World Cup, an event remembered in Japan as the Agony of Doha.

Kitazawa was included in Japan's 25-man preliminary squad for the 1998 FIFA World Cup, but national coach Takeshi Okada dropped him, along with Kazuyoshi Miura and Daisuke Ichikawa, when the squad was reduced to the final 22 at the pre-tournament training camp in Nyon, Switzerland.

== Futsal career ==
Kitazawa represented Japan national futsal team in the 1989 FIFA Futsal World Championship finals hosted by the Netherlands.

== Career statistics ==
=== Club ===
Appearances and goals by club, season and competition
Club performance			League		Cup		League Cup		Total	
Season	Club	League	Apps	Goals	Apps	Goals	Apps	Goals	Apps	Goals
Japan			League		Emperor's Cup		J.League Cup		Total	
1987–88	Honda	JSL Division 1	0	0					0	0
1988–89	Honda	JSL Division 1	7	0					7	0
1989–90	Honda	JSL Division 1	22	4			0	0	22	4
1990–91	Honda	JSL Division 1	22	10			1	0	23	10
1991–92	Yomiuri	JSL Division 1	20	2	5	0	4	1	29	3
1992	Verdy Kawasaki	J1 League	-		2	2	11	1	13	3
1993	Verdy Kawasaki	J1 League	35	6	3	2	1	1	39	9
1994	Verdy Kawasaki	J1 League	40	9	2	1	3	1	45	11
1995	Verdy Kawasaki	J1 League	40	11	3	0	-		43	11
1996	Verdy Kawasaki	J1 League	28	4	5	2	15	5	48	11
1997	Verdy Kawasaki	J1 League	29	1	2	0	0	0	31	1
1998	Verdy Kawasaki	J1 League	34	5	3	0	0	0	37	5
1999	Verdy Kawasaki	J1 League	28	4	3	2	3	1	34	7
2000	Verdy Kawasaki	J1 League	4	0	0	0	1	0	5	0
2001	Tokyo Verdy	J1 League	23	0	0	0	0	0	23	0
2002	Tokyo Verdy	J1 League	4	1	0	0	2	0	6	1
Total			336	57	28	9	41	10	405	76

=== International ===
Appearances and goals by national team and year
National team	Year	Apps	Goals
Japan	1991	2	0
Japan	1992	11	1
Japan	1993	4	0
Japan	1994	7	1
Japan	1995	14	1
Japan	1996	5	0
Japan	1997	11	0
Japan	1998	3	0
Japan	1999	1	0
Japan	Total	58	3

Scores and results list Japan's goal tally first, score column indicates score after each Kitazawa goal.

List of international goals scored by Tsuyoshi Kitazawa
No.	Date	Venue	Opponent	Score	Result	Competition
1	6 November 1992	Hiroshima Stadium, Hiroshima, Japan	China	2–1	3–2	1992 AFC Asian Cup
2	9 October 1994	Bingo Stadium, Onomichi, Japan	Myanmar	4–0	5–0	1994 Asian Games
3	6 August 1995	Kyoto Nishikyogoku Athletic Stadium, Kyoto, Japan	Costa Rica	3–0	3–0	Friendly

== Honours ==
Japan national team

- AFC Asian Cup: 1992

Individual

- Japan Soccer League top goalscorer: 1990–91
