= Kenji Kageyama =

Japanese footballer

Personal information
- Full name: Kenji Kageyama
- Date of birth: April 2, 1980 (age 46)
- Place of birth: Nagano, Japan
- Height: 1.78 m (5 ft 10 in)
- Position: Midfielder

Youth career
- 1996–1998: Verdy Kawasaki
- 1999–2002: Kokushikan University

Senior career*
| Years | Team | Apps | (Gls) |
| 2003–2009 | Kataller Toyama | 181 | (2) |
| Total | | 181 | (2) |
- * Club domestic league appearances and goals

Kenji Kageyama (景山 健司, Kageyama Kenji; born April 2, 1980) is a former Japanese football player.

== Career statistics ==
Appearances and goals by club, season and competition
| Club | Season | League | | | Emperor's Cup | | Total | |
| Club | Season | Division | Apps | Goals | Apps | Goals | Apps | Goals |
|---|---|---|---|---|---|---|---|---|
| Kokushikan University | 1999 | Football League | 9 | 0 | | | 9 | 0 |
| Kokushikan University | 2000 | Football League | 12 | 0 | — | | 12 | 0 |
| Kokushikan University | 2001 | Football League | 13 | 2 | — | | 13 | 2 |
| Kokushikan University | 2002 | Football League | 4 | 0 | | | 4 | 0 |
| YKK | 2003 | Football League | 25 | 0 | — | | 25 | 0 |
| YKK AP | 2004 | Football League | 22 | 0 | — | | 22 | 0 |
| YKK AP | 2005 | Football League | 29 | 1 | — | | 29 | 1 |
| YKK AP | 2006 | Football League | 33 | 0 | 3 | 0 | 36 | 0 |
| YKK AP | 2007 | Football League | 30 | 0 | — | | 30 | 0 |
| Kataller Toyama | 2008 | Football League | 22 | 1 | 2 | 0 | 24 | 1 |
| Kataller Toyama | 2009 | J2 League | 20 | 0 | 1 | 0 | 21 | 0 |
| Career total | | | 219 | 4 | 6 | 0 | 225 | 4 |
