= Masato Tachibana =

Japanese weightlifter

Personal information
- Nationality: Japanese
- Born: 7 May 1972 (age 52); Hokkaido, Japan

Sport
- Sport: Weightlifting

Masato Tachibana (橘 典人, Tachibana Masato, born 7 May 1972) is a Japanese weightlifter. He competed in the men's featherweight event at the 1996 Summer Olympics.
