= 1996 J.League Cup =

J.League Yamazaki Nabisco Cup

Tournament details
- Country: Japan
- Teams: 16

Final positions
- Champions: Shimizu S-Pulse (1st title)
- Runners-up: Verdy Kawasaki
- Semifinalists: Bellmare Hiratsuka; Kashiwa Reysol

Tournament statistics
- Matches played: 115

Statistics of J. League Cup, officially the '96 J.League Yamazaki Nabisco Cup, in the 1996 season.

== Overview ==
It was contested by 16 teams, and Shimizu S-Pulse won the championship.

== Results ==
In what is the most unusual format ever used in the history of the J.League Cup, the win-draw-lose results were based on their aggregate score of the ties between teams, not the individual games' results.

=== Group A ===
Pos	Team	Pld	W	D	L	GF	GA	GD	Pts	Qualification
1	Kashiwa Reysol	7	5	0	2	24	16	+8	15	Semifinals
2	Bellmare Hiratsuka	7	4	1	2	23	15	+8	13	Semifinals
3	Sanfrecce Hiroshima	7	4	1	2	22	20	+2	13	
4	Yokohama Marinos	7	4	0	3	22	20	+2	12	
5	Jubilo Iwata	7	3	1	3	21	17	+4	10	
6	Gamba Osaka	7	3	1	3	15	30	−15	10	
7	Urawa Reds	7	2	0	5	16	20	−4	6	
8	Kyoto Purple Sanga	7	2	0	5	14	19	−5	6	

Source: rsssf.com

=== Group B ===
Pos	Team	Pld	W	D	L	GF	GA	GD	Pts	Qualification
1	Shimizu S-Pulse	7	5	1	1	22	16	+6	16	Semifinals
2	Verdy Kawasaki	7	4	2	1	25	13	+12	14	Semifinals
3	Yokohama Flugels	7	3	3	1	27	20	+7	12	
4	JEF United Ichihara	7	3	1	3	20	22	−2	10	
5	Kashima Antlers	7	2	3	2	16	12	+4	9	
6	Cerezo Osaka	7	2	1	4	23	26	−3	7	
7	Nagoya Grampus Eight	7	2	1	4	19	26	−7	7	
8	Avispa Fukuoka	7	1	0	6	14	31	−17	3	

Source: rsssf.com

=== Semifinals ===
- Kashiwa Reysol 1–2 Verdy Kawasaki
- Shimizu S-Pulse 5–0 Bellmare Hiratsuka

=== Final ===
- Verdy Kawasaki 3–3 (PK 4–5) Shimizu S-Pulse

Shimizu S-Pulse won the cup
