= Kazuki Hiramoto =

Japanese footballer

Kazuki Hiramoto 平本 一樹
Personal information
- Full name: Kazuki Hiramoto
- Date of birth: 18 August 1981 (age 45)
- Place of birth: Hachioji, Tokyo, Japan
- Height: 1.80 m (5 ft 11 in)
- Position: Forward

Youth career
- 1997–1999: Verdy Kawasaki

Senior career*
Years	Team	Apps	(Gls)
1999–2017	Tokyo Verdy	340	(62)
2007	→ Yokohama FC (loan)	14	(3)
2012	→ FC Machida Zelvia (loan)	36	(6)
2013	→ Ventforet Kofu (loan)	23	(3)
Total		413	(74)

International career
2001	Japan U-20	1	(0)
Medal record
Tokyo Verdy
Winner	Emperor's Cup	2004
- * Club domestic league appearances and goals

Kazuki Hiramoto (平本 一樹, Hiramoto Kazuki; born 18 August 1981) is a former Japanese football player.

== Club career ==
Hiramoto was born in Hachioji on 18 August 1981. He joined the Verdy Kawasaki (later Tokyo Verdy) youth team in 1999. He became a regular player in 2002. However he lost an opportunity to play in 2007. In May 2007, he moved to Yokohama FC. He returned to Tokyo Verdy in 2008 and he played many matches. His opportunity to play decreased in 2011. He moved to FC Machida Zelvia in 2012 and Ventforet Kofu in 2013. He returned to Tokyo Verdy in 2014. Although he played many matches, he lost an opportunity to play in 2017 and retired at the end of the 2017 season.

== National team career ==
In June 2001, Hiramoto was selected Japan U-20 national team for 2001 World Youth Championship. At this tournament, he played 1 match.

== Career statistics ==
Appearances and goals by club, season and competition
Club	Season	League			Emperor's Cup		J.League Cup		Asia		Total	
Club	Season	Division	Apps	Goals	Apps	Goals	Apps	Goals	Apps	Goals	Apps	Goals
Verdy Kawasaki	1999	J1 League	6	1	3	1	1	0	—		10	2
Verdy Kawasaki	2000	J1 League	9	1	0	0	2	0	—		11	1
Tokyo Verdy	2001	J1 League	7	0	3	0	1	0	—		11	0
Tokyo Verdy	2002	J1 League	25	2	1	0	4	2	—		30	4
Tokyo Verdy	2003	J1 League	28	5	1	0	6	0	—		35	5
Tokyo Verdy	2004	J1 League	25	6	5	3	6	2	—		36	11
Tokyo Verdy	2005	J1 League	26	6	0	0	5	1	—		31	7
Tokyo Verdy	2006	J2 League	40	15	1	0	—		1	0	42	15
Tokyo Verdy	2007	J2 League	3	0	0	0	—		—		3	0
Yokohama FC	2007	J1 League	14	3	0	0	1	0	—		15	3
Tokyo Verdy	2008	J1 League	23	2	1	0	1	0	—		25	2
Tokyo Verdy	2009	J2 League	30	5	0	0	—		—		30	5
Tokyo Verdy	2010	J2 League	32	10	1	0	—		—		33	10
Tokyo Verdy	2011	J2 League	11	0	2	0	—		—		13	0
FC Machida Zelvia	2012	J2 League	36	6	2	0	—		—		38	6
Ventforet Kofu	2013	J1 League	23	3	0	0	4	0	—		27	3
Tokyo Verdy	2014	J2 League	30	3	1	0	—		—		31	3
Tokyo Verdy	2015	J2 League	30	5	2	1	—		—		32	6
Tokyo Verdy	2016	J2 League	15	1	0	0	—		—		15	1
Tokyo Verdy	2017	J2 League	0	0	0	0	—		—		0	0
Career total			413	74	23	5	31	5	1	0	468	84
