= Takahiro Shibasaki =

Japanese footballer

Takahiro Shibasaki 柴崎 貴広
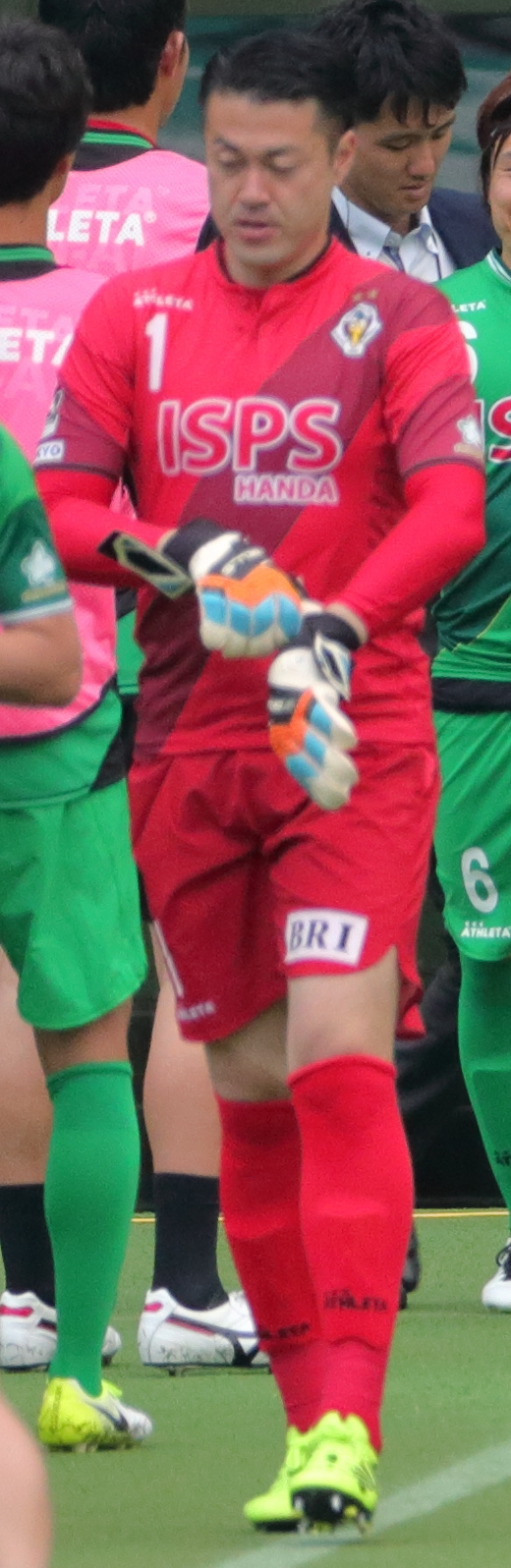

Personal information
- Full name: Takahiro Shibasaki
- Date of birth: May 23, 1982 (age 44)
- Place of birth: Yokosuka, Japan
- Height: 1.89 m (6 ft 2 1/2 in)
- Position: Goalkeeper

Team information
- Current team: SC Sagamihara
- Number: 1

Youth career
- 1998–2000: Kojo High School

Senior career*
Years	Team	Apps	(Gls)
2001–2003	Tokyo Verdy	2	(0)
2004–2005	Yokohama FC	1	(0)
2006	FC Tokyo	0	(0)
2007–2022	Tokyo Verdy	140	(1)
2013	→ Yokohama FC (loan)	13	(0)
2022–2023	SC Sagamihara	5	(0)
2023–	Kataller Toyama	1	(0)
- * Club domestic league appearances and goals as of 16 July 2023

Takahiro Shibasaki (柴崎 貴広, Shibasaki Takahiro; born May 23, 1982) is a Japanese football player who plays for Kataller Toyama.

== Playing career ==
Shibasaki was born in Yokosuka on May 23, 1982. After graduating from high school, he joined J1 League club Tokyo Verdy in 2001. Although he debuted in 2002, he struggled for gametime behind Daijiro Takakuwa and Yoshinari Takagi. In 2004, he moved to J2 club Yokohama FC. However, he struggled for gametime behind Takanori Sugeno. In 2006, he moved to J1 club FC Tokyo but could not play at all due to Yoichi Doi.

In 2007, Shibasaki re-joined Tokyo Verdy for the first time in 4 years. He struggled for minutes behind Yoshinari Takagi and Yoichi Doi who joined Verdy in 2008. However, Takagi left Verdy at the end of 2009 and Doi was injured in May 2011. So, Shibasaki became the regular goalkeeper instead of Doi from May 2011. Although he also played as regular goalkeeper in 2012, Shibasaki lost his position behind Doi from July 2012.

In 2013, although Doi retired end of 2012 season, Shibasaki also moved to Yokohama FC, going on his first ever loan. He played 13 matches. However, the club won only two matches in the first 10 matches, so he lost his position to Junnosuke Schneider in April.

In 2014, Shibasaki returned to Tokyo Verdy. However, he was mainly a bench player behind Yuya Sato until 2015. In 2016, Sato left Verdy at the end of the 2015 season. Shibasaki battled with new player Ryota Suzuki for the position and played 19 times. In 2017, Suzuki left Verdy at the end of the 2016 season and Shibasaki played as the starting goalkeeper in all 42 matches. However, he struggled for gametime behind new player Naoto Kamifukumoto from 2018.

He joined SC Sagamihara in 2022 and then Kataller Toyama in 2023.

== Club statistics ==
As of 5 December 2021

Club performance			League		Cup		League Cup		Total	
Season	Club	League	Apps	Goals	Apps	Goals	Apps	Goals	Apps	Goals
Japan			League		Emperor's Cup		J.League Cup		Total	
2001	Tokyo Verdy	J1 League	0	0	0	0	0	0	0	0
2002	Tokyo Verdy	J1 League	2	0	0	0	0	0	2	0
2003	Tokyo Verdy	J1 League	0	0	0	0	0	0	0	0
Total			2	0	0	0	0	0	2	0
2004	Yokohama FC	J2 League	1	0	1	0	-		2	0
2005	Yokohama FC	J2 League	0	0	0	0	-		0	0
Total			1	0	1	0	-		2	0
2006	FC Tokyo	J1 League	0	0	0	0	0	0	0	0
Total			0	0	0	0	0	0	0	0
2007	Tokyo Verdy	J2 League	0	0	0	0	-		0	0
2008	Tokyo Verdy	J1 League	0	0	0	0	0	0	0	0
2009	Tokyo Verdy	J2 League	0	0	0	0	-		0	0
2010	Tokyo Verdy	J2 League	2	0	0	0	-		2	0
2011	Tokyo Verdy	J2 League	36	0	2	0	-		38	0
2012	Tokyo Verdy	J2 League	24	0	2	0	-		26	0
Total			62	0	4	0	0	0	66	0
2013	Yokohama FC	J2 League	13	0	0	0	-		13	0
Total			13	0	0	0	-		13	0
2014	Tokyo Verdy	J2 League	1	0	1	0	-		2	0
2015	Tokyo Verdy	J2 League	1	0	1	0	-		2	0
2016	Tokyo Verdy	J2 League	19	0	0	0	-		19	0
2017	Tokyo Verdy	J2 League	42	0	0	0	-		43	0
2018	Tokyo Verdy	J2 League	0	0	3	0	-		3	0
2019	Tokyo Verdy	J2 League	0	0	1	0	-		1	0
2020	Tokyo Verdy	J2 League	5	0			-		5	0
2021	Tokyo Verdy	J2 League	8	0	1	0	-		9	0
Total			76	0	7	0	-		84	0
Career total			154	0	12	0	0	0	167	0
