= 2009 Tokyo Verdy season =

Tokyo Verdy
2009 season
- Manager: Takuya Takagi; Takeo Matsuda
- Stadium: Ajinomoto Stadium
- J. League 2: 7th
- Emperor's Cup: 2nd Round
- Top goalscorer: Masashi Oguro (21)

2009 Tokyo Verdy season

== Competitions ==
Competitions	Position
J. League 2	7th / 18 clubs
Emperor's Cup	2nd Round

== Player statistics ==
No.	Pos.	Player	D.o.B. (Age)	Height / Weight	J. League 2		Emperor's Cup		Total	
No.	Pos.	Player	D.o.B. (Age)	Height / Weight	Apps	Goals	Apps	Goals	Apps	Goals
1	GK	Yoichi Doi	July 25, 1973 (aged 35)	cm / kg	43	0				
2	DF	Kensuke Fukuda	July 24, 1984 (aged 24)	cm / kg	18	0				
3	DF	Tomonobu Hiroi	January 11, 1985 (aged 24)	cm / kg	7	0				
4	DF	Masaki Iida	September 15, 1985 (aged 23)	cm / kg	4	0				
5	MF	Takahiro Kawamura	October 4, 1979 (aged 29)	cm / kg	32	0				
6	MF	Tomo Sugawara	June 3, 1976 (aged 32)	cm / kg	18	0				
7	MF	Hiroki Kawano	March 30, 1990 (aged 18)	cm / kg	35	6				
8	MF	Kosei Shibasaki	August 28, 1984 (aged 24)	cm / kg	47	7				
9	FW	Masashi Oguro	May 4, 1980 (aged 28)	cm / kg	39	21				
10	FW	Leandro	August 13, 1980 (aged 28)	cm / kg	32	7				
11	FW	Leonardo	February 4, 1986 (aged 23)	cm / kg	3	0				
13	FW	Taira Inoue	April 11, 1983 (aged 25)	cm / kg	15	5				
14	DF	Seitaro Tomisawa	July 8, 1982 (aged 26)	cm / kg	45	0				
15	MF	Kunihiko Takizawa	April 20, 1978 (aged 30)	cm / kg	35	2				
16	FW	Kazunori Iio	February 23, 1982 (aged 27)	cm / kg	28	1				
17	DF	Yukio Tsuchiya	July 31, 1974 (aged 34)	cm / kg	34	4				
18	MF	Genki Nagasato	December 16, 1985 (aged 23)	cm / kg	36	2				
19	FW	Yuzo Funakoshi	June 12, 1977 (aged 31)	cm / kg	11	0				
20	DF	Kazuya Iwakura	April 26, 1985 (aged 23)	cm / kg	8	0				
21	GK	Yoshinari Takagi	May 20, 1979 (aged 29)	cm / kg	8	0				
22	MF	Toshihiro Hattori	September 23, 1973 (aged 35)	cm / kg	26	0				
23	DF	Masato Fujita	May 8, 1986 (aged 22)	cm / kg	46	0				
24	DF	Masahiro Nasukawa	December 29, 1986 (aged 22)	cm / kg	23	0				
25	FW	Kazuki Hiramoto	August 18, 1981 (aged 27)	cm / kg	30	5				
26	GK	Takahiro Shibasaki	May 23, 1982 (aged 26)	cm / kg	0	0				
27	FW	Ryohei Hayashi	September 8, 1986 (aged 22)	cm / kg	32	6				
28	MF	Kento Tsurumaki	June 29, 1987 (aged 21)	cm / kg	5	0				
29	MF	Takuya Wada	July 28, 1990 (aged 18)	cm / kg	5	0				
30	MF	Yu Tomidokoro	April 21, 1990 (aged 18)	cm / kg	7	0				
31	MF	Jumpei Shimmura	October 13, 1988 (aged 20)	cm / kg	0	0				
32	DF	Shohei Takahashi	October 27, 1991 (aged 17)	cm / kg	25	1				
33	FW	Toshiyuki Takagi	May 25, 1991 (aged 17)	cm / kg	5	0				
34	GK	Tomoyuki Suzuki	December 20, 1985 (aged 23)	cm / kg	0	0				
36	MF	Yuta Baba	January 22, 1984 (aged 25)	cm / kg	3	0				

== Other pages ==
- (in Japanese) J. League official site
