= Hideki Nagai =

Japanese footballer and manager

Hideki Nagai 永井 秀樹
Personal information
- Full name: Hideki Nagai
- Date of birth: 26 January 1971 (age 55)
- Place of birth: Kagoshima, Japan
- Height: 1.74 m (5 ft 8 1/2 in)
- Position: Midfielder

Youth career
- 1986–1988: Kunimi High School
- 1989–1991: Kokushikan University

Senior career*
Years	Team	Apps	(Gls)
1992–1997	Verdy Kawasaki	54	(5)
1995	→ Fukuoka Blux (loan)	12	(3)
1996	→ Shimizu S-Pulse (loan)	29	(3)
1998	Yokohama Flügels	32	(12)
1999–2000	Yokohama F. Marinos	43	(5)
2001–2002	Tokyo Verdy	31	(7)
2004	Oita Trinita	2	(0)
2005	FC Ryukyu	8	(4)
2006–2007	Tokyo Verdy	47	(4)
2008–2013	FC Ryukyu	97	(9)
2014–2016	Tokyo Verdy	32	(0)
Total		387	(52)

Managerial career
- 2019–2021: Tokyo Verdy
Medal record
Tokyo Verdy
Winner	J1 League	1993
Winner	J1 League	1994
Winner	J.League Cup	1992
Winner	J.League Cup	1993
Winner	J.League Cup	1994
Runner-up	Emperor's Cup	1992
Shimizu S-Pulse
Winner	J.League Cup	1996
Yokohama Flügels
Winner	Emperor's Cup	1998
Yokohama F. Marinos
Runner-up	J1 League	2000
- * Club domestic league appearances and goals

Hideki Nagai (永井 秀樹, Nagai Hideki; born 26 January 1971) is a former Japanese football player and manager. He is current manager of Tokyo Verdy. His younger brother Atsushi Nagai is also a former footballer.

== Playing career ==
Nagai was born in Kagoshima Prefecture on 26 January 1971. After dropped out from Kokushikan University, he joined Verdy Kawasaki (later Tokyo Verdy) in 1992. Although he played many matches as offensive midfielder and the club won the champions 1993, 1994 J1 League, 1992, 1993 and 1994 J.League Cup, he could not become a regular behind Ruy Ramos, Tsuyoshi Kitazawa and Bismarck. In 1995, he moved to Japan Football League club Fukuoka Blux. The club won the champions in 1995 and was promoted to J1 League. In 1996, he moved to Shimizu S-Pulse. He played as regular player and the club won the champions 1996 J.League Cup their first title. He returned to Verdy in 1997 and he moved to Yokohama Flügels in 1998. He played as central player and the club won the champions 1998 Emperor's Cup. However the club was disbanded end of 1998 season due to financial strain, he moved to Yokohama F. Marinos in 1999.

In 2000, he returned to Verdy and played 2002. After a year's blank, he joined Oita Trinita in 2004. However he could hardly play in the match. In 2005, he moved to Regional Leagues club FC Ryukyu. The club was promoted to Japan Football League (JFL) end of 2005 season. In 2006, he returned to Verdy and he played many matches as substitutes. In 2008, he moved to FC Ryukyu again. In 2014, he returned to Verdy. In November 2016, he announced his retirement end of 2016 season at the age of 45.

== Coaching career ==
After the retirement, Nagai started coaching career at Tokyo Verdy in 2017. He served as a manager for youth team from 2017. In July 2019, he became a manager for top team as Gary White successor.

== Club statistics ==
Club performance			League		Cup		League Cup		Continental		Total	
Season	Club	League	Apps	Goals	Apps	Goals	Apps	Goals	Apps	Goals	Apps	Goals
Japan			League		Emperor's Cup		League Cup		Asia		Total	
1992	Verdy Kawasaki	J1 League	-		0	0	3	0	-		3	0
1993	Verdy Kawasaki	J1 League	20	3	0	0	7	3	-		27	6
1994	Verdy Kawasaki	J1 League	15	0	1	0	2	0	-		18	0
1995	Fukuoka Blux	JFL	12	3	1	2	-		-		13	5
1996	Shimizu S-Pulse	J1 League	29	3	3	0	16	5	-		48	8
1997	Verdy Kawasaki	J1 League	19	2	1	0	5	2	-		25	4
1998	Yokohama Flügels	J1 League	32	12	5	2	4	0	-		41	14
1999	Yokohama F. Marinos	J1 League	22	5	2	0	4	2	-		28	7
2000	Yokohama F. Marinos	J1 League	21	0	0	0	5	1	-		26	1
2001	Tokyo Verdy	J1 League	20	5	3	1	2	0	-		25	6
2002	Tokyo Verdy	J1 League	11	2	1	0	3	0	-		15	2
2004	Oita Trinita	J1 League	2	0	0	0	3	0	-		5	0
2005	FC Ryukyu	JRL (Kyushu)	8	4	4	1	-		-		12	5
2006	Tokyo Verdy	J2 League	29	1	1	0	-		1	0	31	1
2007	Tokyo Verdy	J2 League	18	3	0	0	-		-		18	3
2008	FC Ryukyu	JFL	9	0	-		-		-		9	0
2009	FC Ryukyu	JFL	25	3	-		-		-		25	3
2010	FC Ryukyu	JFL	19	3	2	0	-		-		0	0
2011	FC Ryukyu	JFL	17	1	1	0	-		-		0	0
2012	FC Ryukyu	JFL	20	1	1	0	-		-		0	0
2013	FC Ryukyu	JFL	7	1	2	0	-		-		0	0
2014	Tokyo Verdy	J2 League	11	0	0	0	-		-		11	0
2015	Tokyo Verdy	J2 League	18	0	0	0	-		-		18	0
2016	Tokyo Verdy	J2 League	3	0	0	0	-		-		3	0
Career total			387	52	28	6	54	13	1	0	470	71

== Managerial statistics ==
Update; 31 December 2020

Team	From	To	Record				
Team	From	To	G	W	D	L	Win %
Tokyo Verdy	2019	present	62	20	20	22	32.26
Total			62	20	20	22	32.26
