= 2005 Tokyo Verdy 1969 season =

Tokyo Verdy 1969
2005 season
- Manager: Osvaldo Ardiles; Nobuhiro Ishizaki; Vadão
- Stadium: Ajinomoto Stadium
- J. League 1: 17th (relegated)
- Emperor's Cup: 4th Round
- J. League Cup: Group stage
- Super Cup: Winners
- Top goalscorer: Washington (22)
Home colours	Away colours

The 2005 season was a mixed one for Tokyo Verdy 1969. On the one hand they finished 17th out of 18 teams in the J-League 1 competition, and were relegated to J.League Division 2 for the 2006 season, but on the other they pulled off an upset 3–0 victory in a friendly pre-season game against Real Madrid in Tokyo.

== Competitions ==
Competitions	Position
J. League 1	17th / 18 clubs
Emperor's Cup	4th Round
J. League Cup	GL-B 3rd / 4 clubs

== Domestic results ==
=== J. League 1 ===
Pos	Team	Pld	W	D	L	GF	GA	GD	Pts	Qualification or relegation
14	Nagoya Grampus Eight	34	10	9	15	43	49	−6	39	
15	Shimizu S-Pulse	34	9	12	13	40	49	−9	39	
16	Kashiwa Reysol (R)	34	8	11	15	39	54	−15	35	Relegation to 2006 J.League Division 2 (Note: Tokyo Verdy 1969 qualified to 2006 AFC Champions League as 2004 Emperor's Cup winners.)
17	Tokyo Verdy 1969 (R)	34	6	12	16	40	73	−33	30	Relegation to 2006 J.League Division 2
18	Vissel Kobe (R)	34	4	9	21	30	67	−37	21	Relegation to 2006 J.League Division 2

Updated to match(es) played on December 3, 2005. Source: J. League Division 1
Rules for classification: 1) points; 2) goal difference; 3) number of goals scored.
(R) Relegated
Notes:

Match	Date	Venue	Opponents	Score
1	2005..	[[]]	[[]]	-
2	2005..	[[]]	[[]]	-
3	2005..	[[]]	[[]]	-
4	2005..	[[]]	[[]]	-
5	2005..	[[]]	[[]]	-
6	2005..	[[]]	[[]]	-
7	2005..	[[]]	[[]]	-
8	2005..	[[]]	[[]]	-
9	2005..	[[]]	[[]]	-
10	2005..	[[]]	[[]]	-
11	2005..	[[]]	[[]]	-
12	2005..	[[]]	[[]]	-
13	2005..	[[]]	[[]]	-
14	2005..	[[]]	[[]]	-
15	2005..	[[]]	[[]]	-
16	2005..	[[]]	[[]]	-
17	2005..	[[]]	[[]]	-
18	2005..	[[]]	[[]]	-
19	2005..	[[]]	[[]]	-
20	2005..	[[]]	[[]]	-
21	2005..	[[]]	[[]]	-
22	2005..	[[]]	[[]]	-
23	2005..	[[]]	[[]]	-
24	2005..	[[]]	[[]]	-
25	2005..	[[]]	[[]]	-
26	2005..	[[]]	[[]]	-
27	2005..	[[]]	[[]]	-
28	2005..	[[]]	[[]]	-
29	2005..	[[]]	[[]]	-
30	2005..	[[]]	[[]]	-
31	2005..	[[]]	[[]]	-
32	2005..	[[]]	[[]]	-
33	2005..	[[]]	[[]]	-
34	2005..	[[]]	[[]]	-

=== Emperor's Cup ===
Tokyo Verdy 1969 received a bye to the fourth round as being part of the J.League Division 1.

3 November 2005 Fourth Round	Oita Trinita	3–2	Tokyo Verdy 1969	Ōita
	Yamazaki 33'; Magno Alves 74', 78'	Report	Hirano 10'; Kobayashi 44'	Stadium: Oita Stadium; Attendance: 5,512

=== J. League Cup ===
Team	Pld	W	D	L	GF	GA	GD	Pts
Gamba Osaka	6	4	1	1	17	12	+5	13
Kawasaki Frontale	6	2	3	1	16	12	+4	9
Tokyo Verdy 1969	6	1	3	2	12	14	−2	6
Sanfrecce Hiroshima	6	1	1	4	8	15	−7	4

19 March 2005 1	Tokyo Verdy 1969	4–4	Kawasaki Frontale	Tokyo
15:00	Washington (yellow card) 27' (goal) 49'; Soma (yellow card) 27'; Kobayashi 55'; Morimoto 59', 81'	Report	Terada 5', 28'; Juninho 25'; Marcus 42'; Yamane (yellow card) 49'; Iio (yellow card) 79'	Stadium: Ajinomoto Stadium; Attendance: 6,433; Referee: Hirofumi Yamanishi

26 March 2005 2	Sanfrecce Hiroshima	0–1	Tokyo Verdy 1969	Hiroshima
14:00	Dininho (yellow card) 44'; Shigehara (yellow card) 82'	Report	Hiramoto (yellow card) 33'; Hayashi (yellow card) 37'; Washington 42'	Stadium: Hiroshima Stadium; Attendance: 4,615; Referee: Yuichi Nishimura

21 May 2005 3	Gamba Osaka	5–3	Tokyo Verdy 1969	Osaka
14:00	Yoshihara 20', 45'; Araújo 31', 77'; Sidiclei 48'; Saneyoshi (yellow card) 68'; Hashimoto (yellow card) 89'	Report	Soma (yellow card) 32'; Kobayashi 57'; Washington 69', 89'	Stadium: Expo '70 Stadium; Attendance: 5,472; Referee: Masayoshi Okada

28 May 2005 4	Tokyo Verdy 1969	2–2	Sanfrecce Hiroshima	Tokyo
19:03	Hiramoto 19' (yellow card) 75'; Kobayashi (yellow card) 27'; Washington 89'	Report	Galvão 78', 86'	Stadium: National Stadium; Attendance: 8,906; Referee: Hiroyoshi Takayama

4 June 2005 5	Kawasaki Frontale	1–1	Tokyo Verdy 1969	Kawasaki
18:04	Kurotsu 65'; Nagahashi (yellow card) 81'	Report	Hirano (yellow card) 26'; Yamada 71'; Tamano (yellow card) 89'	Stadium: Kawasaki Todoroki Stadium; Attendance: 6,982; Referee: Kiyoshi Ota

11 June 2005 6	Tokyo Verdy 1969	1–2	Gamba Osaka	Tokyo
19:01	Uemura (yellow card) 48'; Hayashi (yellow card) 54'; Kobayashi 74'	Report	Matsunami 39'; Futagawa (yellow card) 53'; Terada 68'; Saneyoshi (yellow card) 73'; Watanabe (yellow card) 75'	Stadium: Ajinomoto Stadium; Attendance: 8,868; Referee: Yuki Noda

=== Japanese Super Cup ===
Tokyo Verdy qualified for this tournament as winners of the 2004 Emperor's Cup

26 February 2005 Final	Yokohama F. Marinos	2–2 (4–5 p)	Tokyo Verdy 1969	Yokohama
13:33	Kurihara (yellow card) 52'; Ohashi 72'; Tanaka 87'	Report	Hirano (yellow card) 19'; Lee Woo-jin (yellow card) 50'; Washington 68', 89'	Stadium: International Stadium; Attendance: 21,104; Referee: Toru Kamikawa
	Penalties
	Kurihara (penalty scored); Ohashi (penalty scored); Ueno (penalty missed); Dutra (penalty scored); Tanaka (penalty scored)		(penalty scored) Hayashi; (penalty scored) Washington; (penalty scored) Kobayashi; (penalty scored) Hiramoto; (penalty scored) Lee Woo-jin

== International results ==
25 July 2005 International friendly	Tokyo Verdy 1969 (Japan)	3–0	(Spain) Real Madrid	Tokyo
	Kobayashi 6'; Washington 26'; Yamada 53'	Report		Stadium: Ajinomoto Stadium; Attendance: 30,000; Referee: Masayoshi Okada

== Player statistics ==
No.	Pos.	Player	D.o.B. (Age)	Height / Weight	J. League 1		Emperor's Cup		J. League Cup		Total	
No.	Pos.	Player	D.o.B. (Age)	Height / Weight	Apps	Goals	Apps	Goals	Apps	Goals	Apps	Goals
1	GK	Hiroki Mizuhara	January 15, 1975 (aged 30)	cm / kg	1	0						
2	DF	Takuya Yamada	August 24, 1974 (aged 30)	cm / kg	33	0						
3	DF	Kenta Togawa	June 23, 1981 (aged 23)	cm / kg	19	0						
4	MF	Kentaro Hayashi	August 29, 1972 (aged 32)	cm / kg	30	0						
5	DF	Atsushi Yoneyama	November 20, 1976 (aged 28)	cm / kg	23	1						
6	MF	Kazuyuki Toda	December 30, 1977 (aged 27)	cm / kg	23	0						
7	MF	Takahito Soma	December 10, 1981 (aged 23)	cm / kg	28	0						
8	MF	Daigo Kobayashi	February 19, 1983 (aged 22)	cm / kg	32	3						
9	FW	Washington	April 1, 1975 (aged 29)	cm / kg	33	22						
10	MF	Gil	September 13, 1980 (aged 24)	cm / kg	16	2						
11	FW	Kazuki Hiramoto	August 18, 1981 (aged 23)	cm / kg	26	6						
13	DF	Masayuki Yanagisawa	August 27, 1979 (aged 25)	cm / kg	11	0						
15	FW	Tadamichi Machida	May 23, 1981 (aged 23)	cm / kg	11	2						
17	FW	Takayuki Morimoto	May 7, 1988 (aged 16)	cm / kg	18	1						
18	MF	Shingo Nejime	December 22, 1984 (aged 20)	cm / kg	0	0						
19	DF	Kenichi Uemura	April 22, 1974 (aged 30)	cm / kg	18	0						
20	DF	Lee Gang-Jin	April 25, 1986 (aged 18)	cm / kg	17	1						
21	GK	Yoshinari Takagi	May 20, 1979 (aged 25)	cm / kg	33	0						
22	MF	Takashi Hirano	July 15, 1974 (aged 30)	cm / kg	27	0						
23	MF	Yuhei Ono	July 1, 1985 (aged 19)	cm / kg	1	0						
24	MF	Masatomo Kuba	November 21, 1984 (aged 20)	cm / kg	4	0						
25	DF	Ryo Nurishi	May 1, 1986 (aged 18)	cm / kg	2	0						
26	GK	Satoshi Tokizawa	July 31, 1985 (aged 19)	cm / kg	0	0						
28	MF	Kento Tsurumaki	June 29, 1987 (aged 17)	cm / kg	2	0						
31	FW	Moon Je-Chun	April 15, 1987 (aged 17)	cm / kg	0	0						
32	MF	Yoshiyuki Kobayashi	January 27, 1978 (aged 27)	cm / kg	26	2						
33	MF	Jun Tamano	June 19, 1984 (aged 20)	cm / kg	16	0						

== Other pages ==
- (in Japanese) J. League official site
