= Jun Tamano =

Japanese footballer

Jun Tamano 玉乃 淳
Personal information
- Full name: Jun Tamano
- Date of birth: June 19, 1984 (age 42)
- Place of birth: Shinjuku, Tokyo, Japan
- Height: 1.73 m (5 ft 8 in)
- Position: Midfielder

Youth career
- 1999–2002: Atlético Madrid
- 2002: Tokyo Verdy

Senior career*
Years	Team	Apps	(Gls)
2002–2005	Tokyo Verdy	26	(2)
2006	Tokushima Vortis	34	(2)
2007	Yokohama FC	6	(0)
2008	Tokushima Vortis	37	(2)
2009	Thespa Kusatsu	9	(0)
Total		112	(6)
Medal record
Tokyo Verdy
Winner	Emperor's Cup	2004
- * Club domestic league appearances and goals

Jun Tamano (玉乃 淳, Tamano Jun; born June 19, 1984) is a former Japanese football player.

== Career ==
In 1999, Tamano joined Nike Premier Cup upon transfer to Atlético Madrid youth team. Although had an opportunity for promotion to Atlético Madrid B, he had to turn down the offer as he didn't hold a Spanish passport.

In 2002, Tamano returned to Japan and joined Tokyo Verdy youth team. He debuted in top team in 2002 J.League Cup in May. After the debut, he played several matches as offensive midfielder every season. Although he played many matches as substitute midfielder in 2005, Verdy was relegated to J2 League end of 2005 season. In 2006, he moved to J2 club Tokushima Vortis. He became a regular player and played many matches in 2006. In 2007, he moved to newly was promoted to J1 League club, Yokohama FC. However he could not play many matches and Yokohama finished at the bottom place in 2007 season. In 2008, he re-joined Tokushima Vortis and played as regular player again. In 2009, he moved to Thespa Kusatsu. However he could not play many matches and retired end of 2009 season.

== Career statistics ==
Appearances and goals by club, season and competition
Club	Season	League			Emperor's Cup		J.League Cup		Total	
Club	Season	Division	Apps	Goals	Apps	Goals	Apps	Goals	Apps	Goals
Tokyo Verdy	2002	J1 League	5	1	0	0	1	0	6	1
Tokyo Verdy	2003	J1 League	3	1	0	0	1	0	4	1
Tokyo Verdy	2004	J1 League	2	0	2	0	2	1	6	1
Tokyo Verdy	2005	J1 League	16	0	0	0	5	0	21	0
Tokushima Vortis	2006	J2 League	34	2	2	1	—		36	3
Yokohama FC	2007	J1 League	6	0	0	0	1	0	7	0
Tokushima Vortis	2008	J2 League	37	2	0	0	—		37	2
Thespa Kusatsu	2009	J2 League	9	0	0	0	—		9	0
Career total			112	6	4	1	10	1	126	8
