= Yoshinari Takagi =

Japanese footballer

Yoshinari Takagi 高木 義成
Personal information
- Full name: Yoshinari Takagi
- Date of birth: May 20, 1979 (age 47)
- Place of birth: Edogawa, Tokyo, Japan
- Height: 1.87 m (6 ft 1 1/2 in)
- Position: Goalkeeper

Youth career
- 1995–1997: Shutoku High School
- 1998–1999: Kokushikan University

Senior career*
Years	Team	Apps	(Gls)
2000–2009	Tokyo Verdy	194	(1)
2010–2015	Nagoya Grampus	13	(0)
2016–2017	FC Gifu	31	(0)
Total		238	(1)
Medal record
Tokyo Verdy
Winner	Emperor's Cup	2004
Nagoya Grampus
Winner	J1 League	2010
Runner-up	J1 League	2011
- * Club domestic league appearances and goals

Yoshinari Takagi (高木 義成, Takagi Yoshinari; born May 20, 1979) is a former Japanese football player.

== Playing career ==
Takagi was born in Edogawa, Tokyo on May 20, 1979. After dropped out from Kokushikan University, he joined J1 League club Verdy Kawasaki (later Tokyo Verdy) in 2000. Although he could not play at all in the match behind Kenji Honnami and Shinkichi Kikuchi until 2001, he battles with Daijiro Takakuwa for the goalkeeper position in 2002, he became a regular goalkeeper in summer 2002. The club won the champions 2004 Emperor's Cup. However the club was relegated to J2 League from 2006. The club won the 2nd place in 2007 and was promoted to J1 from 2008. However the club gained Yoichi Doi in 2008. Although Takagi played many matches as regular goalkeeper for a long time, he could hardly play in the match behind Doi from 2008. In 2009, he moved to J1 club Nagoya Grampus. However he could hardly play in the match behind Seigo Narazaki. In 2016, he moved to J2 club FC Gifu. He played many matches as regular goalkeeper in 2016. However he could not play at all in the match behind new member Víctor in 2017 and retired end of 2017 season.

== Club statistics ==
Updated to 1 January 2018.

Club performance			League		Cup		League Cup		Continental		Total	
Season	Club	League	Apps	Goals	Apps	Goals	Apps	Goals	Apps	Goals	Apps	Goals
Japan			League		Emperor's Cup		J. League Cup		Asia		Total	
1998	Kokushikan University	JFL					-		-			
1999	Kokushikan University	JFL	4	0	2	0	-		-		6	0
2000	Verdy Kawasaki	J1 League	0	0	0	0	0	0	-		0	0
2001	Tokyo Verdy	J1 League	0	0	0	0	0	0	-		0	0
2002	Tokyo Verdy	J1 League	17	0	1	0	1	0	-		19	0
2003	Tokyo Verdy	J1 League	30	0	3	0	6	0	-		39	0
2004	Tokyo Verdy	J1 League	30	0	5	0	7	0	-		42	0
2005	Tokyo Verdy	J1 League	33	0	1	0	6	0	-		40	0
2006	Tokyo Verdy	J2 League	40	1	0	0	-		1	0	41	1
2007	Tokyo Verdy	J2 League	36	0	0	0	-		-		36	0
2008	Tokyo Verdy	J1 League	0	0	1	0	2	0	-		3	0
2009	Tokyo Verdy	J2 League	8	0	0	0	-		-		8	0
2010	Nagoya Grampus	J1 League	0	0	4	0	4	0	-		8	0
2011	Nagoya Grampus	J1 League	11	0	1	0	0	0	1	0	13	0
2012	Nagoya Grampus	J1 League	2	0	0	0	1	0	0	0	3	0
2013	Nagoya Grampus	J1 League	0	0	0	0	0	0	-		0	0
2014	Nagoya Grampus	J1 League	0	0	2	0	0	0	-		2	0
2015	Nagoya Grampus	J1 League	0	0	0	0	3	0	-		3	0
2016	FC Gifu	J2 League	31	0	0	0	-		-		31	0
2017	FC Gifu	J2 League	0	0	0	0	-		-		0	0
Total			242	1	20	0	30	0	2	0	294	1
