= Takuya Yamada =

Japanese footballer

Takuya Yamada 山田 卓也
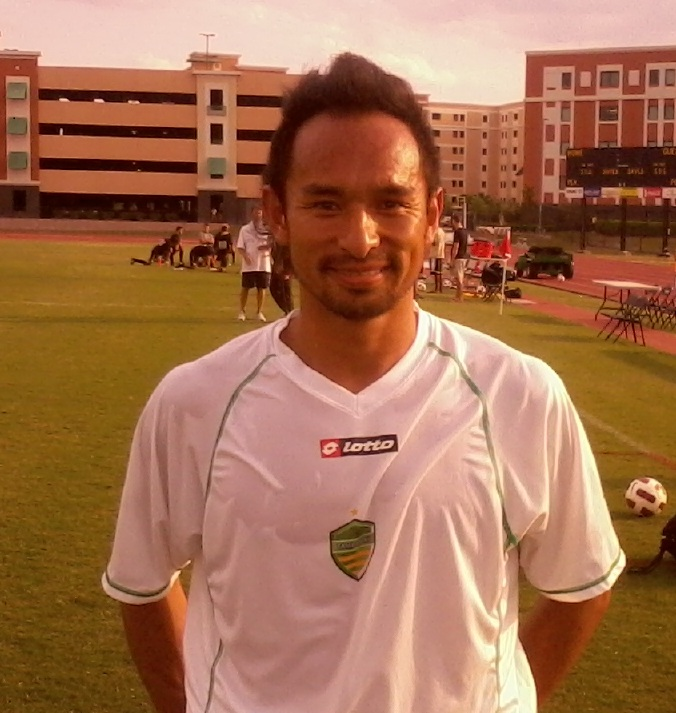

Personal information
- Full name: Takuya Yamada
- Date of birth: August 24, 1974 (age 52)
- Place of birth: Setagaya, Tokyo, Japan
- Height: 1.78 m (5 ft 10 in)
- Positions: Defender; midfielder

Youth career
- 1990–1992: Toin Gakuen High School
- 1993–1996: Komazawa University

Senior career*
| Years | Team | Apps | (Gls) |
| 1997–2005 | Tokyo Verdy | 235 | (22) |
| 2006 | Cerezo Osaka | 20 | (0) |
| 2007–2008 | Yokohama FC | 50 | (5) |
| 2009 | Sagan Tosu | 43 | (1) |
| 2010–2014 | Tampa Bay Rowdies | 113 | (4) |
| 2015 | FC Imabari | 4 | (0) |
| 2016 | Nara Club | 13 | (1) |
| 2017 | FC Imabari | 0 | (0) |
| Total | | 478 | (33) |

International career
| 2003–2004 | Japan | 4 | (0) |
Medal record
Tokyo Verdy
| Winner | Emperor's Cup | 2004 |
Representing Japan
AFC Asian Cup
| Gold medal – first place | 2004 China |
- * Club domestic league appearances and goals

Takuya Yamada (山田 卓也, Yamada Takuya; born August 24, 1974) is a former Japanese football player. He played for Japan national team.

== Club career ==
Yamada attended Toin Gakuen High School, where he led the school to the final four in the National Championship. Played at Komazawa University before turning professional where he won a variety of different national titles, including the gold medal for Japan at the 1995 Summer Universiade.

He turned professional in 1997, playing for Verdy Kawasaki (later Tokyo Verdy) in the then-fledgling J1 League. He played as right side-back and midfielder. Yamada stayed with Verdy for the next eight years, clocking up almost 300 appearances for the club. He was one of the iconic players of J1 League's early years, known for his physical and charismatic strength on the field. The supporters' group honored him with the name of "Mr. Verdy" when he served as Verdy's captain for three years. He was also nicknamed "The Terminator", due to his combative style.

He moved to Cerezo Osaka for the 2006 season, but never fully settled with the club. In December 2006, Yamada surprised the Australian football community by arriving unannounced for a trial with Adelaide United. However, in January, 2007, Adelaide United signed with a Brazilian attacking midfielder Diego Walsh from Miami FC who had a more advanced visa status meaning Walsh was likely to be available sooner to play for Adelaide United.

From Australia, Yamada flew to the United States for an invitational tryout with several Major League Soccer clubs, including New England Revolution, but was not offered a contract. After returning to Japan, Yokohama FC of the J.League immediately announced its interest towards Yamada and signed him on 3 June 2007. Yamada served as captain for the 2008 season.

For the 2009 season, Yamada transferred to Sagan Tosu due to the head coach Yasuyuki Kishino's strong recruitment. On January 1, 2010, Yamada signed with FC Tampa Bay (later Tampa Bay Rowdies) for their 2010 inaugural team roster. He became the first Japanese player to serve as co-captain in USSF Division 2. Yamada re-signed with Tampa Bay, now playing in the North American Soccer League, on December 27, 2010.

Yamada remained with Tampa Bay through the 2011 season. On October 5, 2011, the club announced that Yamada would return for the 2012 season. It was the second straight season Yamada scored the game-winner in the home opener. Started all 28 regular season matches and 2 post-season matches... Played in all 2,520 regular season minutes, the most in the NASL, and won the NASL Soccer Bowl 2012, he was also selected to the NASL 2012 Best XI. Yamada continued to play for Tampa Bay for the 2013 season where he started in 22 matches in NASL season. Played in 1966 minutes and played in 100th official match for Rowdies on August 24, 2013. On February 10, 2014, the club announced that Yamada will return for the 2014 season as the club's longest tenured player. He left the club end of 2014 season.

He returned to Japan in 2015 and he joined FC Imabari in July. He moved to Nara Club in 2016 and played until end of the season. He returned to FC Imabari in August 2017. He retired in November 2017.

== National team career ==
Yamada was the world champion for the 1995 Summer Universiade.

In December 2003, he was selected Japan national team for 2003 East Asian Football Championship. At this tournament, on December 7, he debuted against Hong Kong. He was also selected Japan for 2004 Asian Cup. Although he did play in the match, Japan won the champions. He played as defensive midfielder. He played 4 games for Japan until 2004.

== Club statistics ==
| Club performance | | | League | | Cup | | League Cup | | Total | |
| Season | Club | League | Apps | Goals | Apps | Goals | Apps | Goals | Apps | Goals |
| Japan | | | League | | Emperor's Cup | | J.League Cup | | Total | |
|---|---|---|---|---|---|---|---|---|---|---|
| 1997 | Verdy Kawasaki | J1 League | 22 | 1 | 0 | 0 | 3 | 0 | 25 | 1 |
| 1998 | Verdy Kawasaki | J1 League | 7 | 0 | 3 | 0 | 4 | 0 | 14 | 0 |
| 1999 | Verdy Kawasaki | J1 League | 29 | 3 | 4 | 0 | 4 | 0 | 37 | 3 |
| 2000 | Verdy Kawasaki | J1 League | 30 | 4 | 2 | 0 | 5 | 0 | 37 | 4 |
| 2001 | Tokyo Verdy | J1 League | 29 | 2 | 3 | 0 | 2 | 0 | 34 | 0 |
| 2002 | Tokyo Verdy | J1 League | 28 | 1 | 1 | 0 | 6 | 1 | 35 | 2 |
| 2003 | Tokyo Verdy | J1 League | 30 | 10 | 3 | 0 | 6 | 0 | 39 | 10 |
| 2004 | Tokyo Verdy | J1 League | 27 | 1 | 5 | 2 | 4 | 2 | 36 | 5 |
| 2005 | Tokyo Verdy | J1 League | 33 | 0 | 1 | 0 | 5 | 1 | 39 | 1 |
| 2006 | Cerezo Osaka | J1 League | 20 | 0 | 0 | 0 | 6 | 0 | 26 | 0 |
| 2007 | Yokohama FC | J1 League | 19 | 1 | 2 | 0 | - | | 21 | 1 |
| 2008 | Yokohama FC | J2 League | 31 | 4 | 2 | 0 | - | | 33 | 4 |
| 2009 | Sagan Tosu | J2 League | 43 | 1 | 2 | 0 | - | | 45 | 1 |
| United States | | | League | | Open Cup | | League Cup | | Total | |
| 2010 | FC Tampa Bay | D2 Pro League | 29 | 0 | | | | | 29 | 0 |
| 2011 | FC Tampa Bay | NASL | 24 | 1 | | | | | 24 | 1 |
| 2012 | Tampa Bay Rowdies | NASL | 28 | 3 | 2 | 0 | | | 30 | 3 |
| 2013 | Tampa Bay Rowdies | NASL | 22 | 0 | 2 | 0 | | | 24 | 0 |
| 2014 | Tampa Bay Rowdies | NASL | 10 | 0 | | | | | 10 | 0 |
| Japan | | | League | | Emperor's Cup | | J.League Cup | | Total | |
| 2015 | FC Imabari | Regional Leagues | 4 | 0 | 1 | 0 | - | | 5 | 0 |
| 2016 | Nara Club | Football League | 13 | 1 | 2 | 0 | - | | 15 | 1 |
| 2017 | FC Imabari | Football League | 0 | 0 | - | | - | | 0 | 0 |
| Country | Japan | | 365 | 29 | 31 | 2 | 45 | 4 | 441 | 35 |
| Country | United States | | 113 | 4 | 4 | 0 | 0 | 0 | 117 | 4 |
| Total | | | 478 | 33 | 35 | 2 | 45 | 4 | 558 | 39 |

== National team statistics ==
Japan national team
| Year | Apps | Goals |
|---|---|---|
| 2003 | 1 | 0 |
| 2004 | 3 | 0 |
| Total | 4 | 0 |

== Honors and awards ==
=== Tampa Bay Rowdies ===
- North American Soccer League:
  - Champion (1) 2012

=== Personal ===
- 2010: Co-Captain of FC Tampa Bay
- 2008: Captain of Yokohama FC
- 2002-2005: Captain of Tokyo Verdy

=== Club ===
- 2012: NASL Best XI
- 2005: J.League XEROX Super Cup Champion
- 2004: J.League Emperor's Cup Champion
- 2004: AFC Asian Cup Champions
- 1996: All-Japan University Best 11
- 1995: Universiade Fukuoka (World University Games), Japanese College National Team – World Champion (Gold Medal)
- 1995: All-Japan University Best 11
- 1993: All-Japan High School Select Team

=== International ===
- 2004 Asian Cup (Champion)
