= Masayuki Yanagisawa =

Japanese footballer

Masayuki Yanagisawa 柳沢 将之
Personal information
- Full name: Masayuki Yanagisawa
- Date of birth: August 27, 1979 (age 47)
- Place of birth: Yokohama, Kanagawa, Japan
- Height: 1.70 m (5 ft 7 in)
- Position: Defender

Youth career
- 1995–1997: Verdy Kawasaki
- 1998–2001: Hosei University

Senior career*
Years	Team	Apps	(Gls)
2002–2006	Tokyo Verdy	72	(2)
2007–2008	Cerezo Osaka	68	(1)
2009	Sagan Tosu	46	(2)
2010–2011	Yokohama FC	52	(0)
Total		238	(5)
Medal record
Tokyo Verdy
Winner	Emperor's Cup	2004
- * Club domestic league appearances and goals

Masayuki Yanagisawa (柳沢 将之, Yanagisawa Masayuki; born August 27, 1979) is a former Japanese football player.

== Playing career ==
Yanagisawa was born in Yokohama on August 27, 1979. After graduating from Hosei University, he joined J1 League club Tokyo Verdy in 2002. He became a regular right side back from summer 2002. However his opportunity to play decreased from 2004 and Verdy was relegated to J2 League end of 2005 season. In 2007, he moved to Cerezo Osaka. He played as regular right side back in 2 seasons. In 2009, he moved to Sagan Tosu. In 2010, he moved to Sagan Tosu and played as regular player. In 2011, he moved to Yokohama FC. Although he played as regular player in 2011, his opportunity to play decreased in 2012 and he retired at the end of the 2012 season.

== Club statistics ==
Club performance			League		Cup		League Cup		Continental		Total	
Season	Club	League	Apps	Goals	Apps	Goals	Apps	Goals	Apps	Goals	Apps	Goals
Japan			League		Emperor's Cup		J.League Cup		Asia		Total	
2002	Tokyo Verdy	J1 League	15	1	1	0	0	0	-		16	1
2003	Tokyo Verdy	J1 League	27	1	3	0	6	0	-		36	1
2004	Tokyo Verdy	J1 League	14	0	3	0	2	0	-		19	0
2005	Tokyo Verdy	J1 League	11	0	1	0	0	0	-		12	0
2006	Tokyo Verdy	J2 League	5	0	0	0	-		1	0	6	0
2007	Cerezo Osaka	J2 League	35	1	2	0	-		-		37	1
2008	Cerezo Osaka	J2 League	33	0	0	0	-		-		33	0
2009	Sagan Tosu	J2 League	46	2	2	0	-		-		48	2
2010	Yokohama FC	J2 League	31	0	2	0	-		-		33	0
2011	Yokohama FC	J2 League	21	0	0	0	-		-		21	0
Total			238	5	14	0	8	0	1	0	261	5
