= 2008 Tokyo Verdy season =

Tokyo Verdy
2008 season
- Manager: Tetsuji Hashiratani
- Stadium: Ajinomoto Stadium
- J. League 1: 17th
- Emperor's Cup: 4th Round
- J. League Cup: GL-B 4th
- Top goalscorer: Diego (11)

2008 Tokyo Verdy season

== Competitions ==
Competitions	Position
J. League 1	17th / 18 clubs
Emperor's Cup	4th Round
J. League Cup	GL-B 4th / 4 clubs

== Domestic results ==
=== J. League 1 ===
Match	Date	Venue	Opponents	Score
1	2008..			-
2	2008..			-
3	2008..			-
4	2008..			-
5	2008..			-
6	2008..			-
7	2008..			-
8	2008..			-
9	2008..			-
10	2008..			-
11	2008..			-
12	2008..			-
13	2008..			-
14	2008..			-
15	2008..			-
16	2008..			-
17	2008..			-
18	2008..			-
19	2008..			-
20	2008..			-
21	2008..			-
22	2008..			-
23	2008..			-
24	2008..			-
25	2008..			-
26	2008..			-
27	2008..			-
28	2008..			-
29	2008..			-
30	2008..			-
31	2008..			-
32	2008..			-
33	2008..			-
34	2008..			-

=== Emperor's Cup ===
Match	Date	Venue	Opponents	Score
4th Round	2008..			-

=== J. League Cup ===
Match	Date	Venue	Opponents	Score
GL-B-1	2008..			-
GL-B-2	2008..			-
GL-B-3	2008..			-
GL-B-4	2008..			-
GL-B-5	2008..			-
GL-B-6	2008..			-

== Player statistics ==
No.	Pos.	Player	D.o.B. (Age)	Height / Weight	J. League 1		Emperor's Cup		J. League Cup		Total	
No.	Pos.	Player	D.o.B. (Age)	Height / Weight	Apps	Goals	Apps	Goals	Apps	Goals	Apps	Goals
1	GK	Yoichi Doi	July 25, 1973 (aged 34)	cm / kg	34	0						
2	DF	Kensuke Fukuda	July 24, 1984 (aged 23)	cm / kg	17	0						
3	DF	Shigenori Hagimura	July 31, 1976 (aged 31)	cm / kg	5	0						
4	DF	Takumi Wada	October 20, 1981 (aged 26)	cm / kg	22	1						
5	MF	Daisuke Nasu	October 10, 1981 (aged 26)	cm / kg	32	1						
6	MF	Tomo Sugawara	June 3, 1976 (aged 31)	cm / kg	23	0						
7	FW	Leandro	August 13, 1980 (aged 27)	cm / kg	22	2						
8	MF	Kosei Shibasaki	August 28, 1984 (aged 23)	cm / kg	21	1						
9	FW	Hulk	July 25, 1986 (aged 21)	cm / kg	11	7						
10	MF	Diego Souza	March 22, 1984 (aged 23)	cm / kg	29	11						
11	MF	Harutaka Ono	May 12, 1978 (aged 29)	cm / kg	15	0						
13	FW	Taira Inoue	April 11, 1983 (aged 24)	cm / kg	3	0						
14	DF	Seitaro Tomisawa	July 8, 1982 (aged 25)	cm / kg	25	1						
15	MF	Francismar	April 18, 1984 (aged 23)	cm / kg	0	0						
16	FW	Kazunori Iio	February 23, 1982 (aged 26)	cm / kg	26	2						
17	DF	Yukio Tsuchiya	July 31, 1974 (aged 33)	cm / kg	33	1						
18	DF	Kojiro Kaimoto	October 14, 1977 (aged 30)	cm / kg	0	0						
19	FW	Yuzo Funakoshi	June 12, 1977 (aged 30)	cm / kg	7	1						
20	MF	Nozomi Hiroyama	May 6, 1977 (aged 30)	cm / kg	16	0						
21	GK	Yoshinari Takagi	May 20, 1979 (aged 28)	cm / kg	0	0						
22	MF	Toshihiro Hattori	September 23, 1973 (aged 34)	cm / kg	31	0						
23	MF	Takashi Fukunishi	September 1, 1976 (aged 31)	cm / kg	29	3						
24	MF	Tsuyoshi Yoshitake	September 8, 1981 (aged 26)	cm / kg	0	0						
25	FW	Kazuki Hiramoto	August 18, 1981 (aged 26)	cm / kg	23	2						
26	GK	Takahiro Shibasaki	May 23, 1982 (aged 25)	cm / kg	0	0						
27	DF	Masaki Iida	September 15, 1985 (aged 22)	cm / kg	2	0						
28	DF	Sho Asuke	October 28, 1985 (aged 22)	cm / kg	0	0						
29	DF	Sho Miyasaka	June 6, 1988 (aged 19)	cm / kg	0	0						
31	MF	Junpei Shinmura	October 13, 1988 (aged 19)	cm / kg	1	0						
32	FW	Osama Elsamni	September 29, 1988 (aged 19)	cm / kg	0	0						
33	MF	Hiroki Kawano	March 30, 1990 (aged 17)	cm / kg	17	2						
34	GK	Tomoyuki Suzuki	December 20, 1985 (aged 22)	cm / kg	0	0						
36	FW	Masashi Oguro	May 4, 1980 (aged 27)	cm / kg	14	2						

== Other pages ==
- (in Japanese) J. League official site
