= Masatomo Kuba =

Japanese footballer

Masatomo Kuba 久場 政朋
Personal information
- Full name: Masatomo Kuba
- Date of birth: November 21, 1984 (age 41)
- Place of birth: Kanagawa, Japan
- Height: 1.72 m (5 ft 7 1/2 in)
- Position: Midfielder

Youth career
- 2000–2002: Toko Gakuen High School

Senior career*
| Years | Team | Apps | (Gls) |
| 2003–2006 | Tokyo Verdy | 26 | (1) |
| Total | | 26 | (1) |

International career
| 2001 | Japan U-17 | 2 | (0) |
Medal record
Tokyo Verdy
| Winner | Emperor's Cup | 2004 |
- * Club domestic league appearances and goals

Masatomo Kuba (久場 政朋, Kuba Masatomo; born November 21, 1984) is a Japanese former football player.

== Club career ==
Kuba was born in Kanagawa Prefecture on November 21, 1984. After graduating from high school, he joined Tokyo Verdy in 2003 and debuted in 2005. However he could hardly play in the match and the club was relegated to the J2 League at the end of the 2005 season. Although his opportunity to play increased in 2006, he resigned and retired at the end of the 2006 season.

== National team career ==
In September 2001, Kuba was selected Japan U-17 national team for 2001 U-17 World Championship. He played 2 matches.

== Career statistics ==
Appearances and goals by club, season and competition
| Club | Season | League | | | Emperor's Cup | | J.League Cup | | Total | |
| Club | Season | Division | Apps | Goals | Apps | Goals | Apps | Goals | Apps | Goals |
|---|---|---|---|---|---|---|---|---|---|---|
| Tokyo Verdy | 2003 | J1 League | 0 | 0 | 0 | 0 | 0 | 0 | 0 | 0 |
| Tokyo Verdy | 2004 | J1 League | 0 | 0 | 0 | 0 | 0 | 0 | 0 | 0 |
| Tokyo Verdy | 2005 | J1 League | 4 | 0 | 0 | 0 | 1 | 0 | 5 | 0 |
| Tokyo Verdy | 2006 | J2 League | 22 | 1 | 0 | 0 | — | | 22 | 1 |
| Career total | | | 26 | 1 | 0 | 0 | 1 | 0 | 27 | 1 |
