= Yuya Sano =

Japanese footballer

Yuya Sano 佐野 裕哉
Personal information
- Full name: Yuya Sano
- Date of birth: April 22, 1982 (age 44)
- Place of birth: Shizuoka, Shizuoka, Japan
- Height: 1.71 m (5 ft 7 1/2 in)
- Position: Midfielder

Team information
- Current team: J.FC Miyazaki
- Number: 10

Youth career
- 1998–2000: Shimizu Commercial High School

Senior career*
Years	Team	Apps	(Gls)
2001–2003	Tokyo Verdy	9	(0)
2004–2005	Shonan Bellmare	45	(5)
2006–2007	V-Varen Nagasaki	33	(16)
2008–2011	Giravanz Kitakyushu	94	(19)
2011–2014	SC Sagamihara	81	(3)
2015–2017	Maruyasu Okazaki	58	(7)
2018–	J.FC Miyazaki		
Total		320	(50)
- * Club domestic league appearances and goals as of end of 2017 season

Yuya Sano (佐野 裕哉, Sano Yūya; born April 22, 1982) is a Japanese football player.

== Playing career ==
Sano was born in Shizuoka on April 22, 1982. After graduating from Shimizu Commercial High School, he joined J1 League club Tokyo Verdy with team mate Daigo Kobayashi in 2001. Although he debuted in 2002, he could not play many matches for injury. In 2004, he moved to J2 League club Shonan Bellmare. He played many matches in 2 seasons. In 2006, he moved to Regional Leagues club V-Varen Nagasaki. He played many matches and scored many goals in 2 seasons. In 2008, he moved to Japan Football League club New Wave Kitakyushu (later Giravanz Kitakyushu). He became a regular player and the club was promoted to J2 from 2010. Although he played many matches until 2010, he could hardly play in the match in 2011. In July 2011, he moved to Regional Leagues club SC Sagamihara. He became a regular player and the club was promoted to JFL from 2013 and J3 League from 2014. In 2015, he moved to JFL club Maruyasu Okazaki. In 2018, he moved to Regional Leagues club J.FC Miyazaki.

== Club statistics ==
Club performance			League		Cup		League Cup		Total	
Season	Club	League	Apps	Goals	Apps	Goals	Apps	Goals	Apps	Goals
Japan			League		Emperor's Cup		J.League Cup		Total	
2001	Tokyo Verdy	J1 League	0	0	0	0	0	0	0	0
2002	Tokyo Verdy	J1 League	7	0	1	0	3	0	11	0
2003	Tokyo Verdy	J1 League	2	0	1	0	0	0	3	0
2004	Shonan Bellmare	J2 League	26	3	3	2	-		29	5
2005	Shonan Bellmare	J2 League	19	2	1	0	-		20	2
2006	V-Varen Nagasaki	Regional Leagues	13	8	1	0	-		14	8
2007	V-Varen Nagasaki	Regional Leagues	20	8	3	1	-		23	9
2008	New Wave Kitakyushu	Football League	28	7	3	0	-		31	7
2009	New Wave Kitakyushu	Football League	33	10	1	0	-		34	10
2010	Giravanz Kitakyushu	J2 League	31	2	2	0	-		33	2
2011	Giravanz Kitakyushu	J2 League	2	0	-		-		2	0
2011	SC Sagamihara	Regional Leagues	4	2	-		-		4	2
2012	SC Sagamihara	Regional Leagues	18	0	-		-		18	0
2013	SC Sagamihara	Football League	33	0	-		-		33	0
2014	SC Sagamihara	J3 League	26	1	-		-		26	1
2015	Maruyasu Okazaki	Football League	28	6	1	0	-		29	6
2016	Maruyasu Okazaki	Football League	23	0	-		-		23	0
2017	Maruyasu Okazaki	Football League	7	1	1	0	-		8	1
2018	J.FC Miyazaki	Regional Leagues								
Career total			320	50	18	3	3	0	341	53
