= Tadamichi Machida =

Japanese footballer

Tadamichi Machida 町田 忠道
Personal information
- Full name: Tadamichi Machida
- Date of birth: May 23, 1981 (age 45)
- Place of birth: Honjo, Saitama, Japan
- Height: 1.77 m (5 ft 9 1/2 in)
- Position: Forward

Youth career
- 1997–1999: Narashino High School

Senior career*
| Years | Team | Apps | (Gls) |
| 2000–2002 | Kashiwa Reysol | 10 | (2) |
| 2003 | Kyoto Purple Sanga | 14 | (4) |
| 2004 | Kawasaki Frontale | 16 | (2) |
| 2005 | Tokyo Verdy | 11 | (2) |
| Total | | 51 | (10) |
- * Club domestic league appearances and goals

Tadamichi Machida (町田 忠道, Machida Tadamichi; born May 23, 1981) is a former Japanese football player.

== Playing career ==
Machida was born in Honjo on May 23, 1981. After graduating from high school, he joined J1 League club Kashiwa Reysol in 2000. On September 22, 2001, he debuted as forward against Vissel Kobe and played many matches in late 2001. However he could not play many matches in 2002. In 2003, he moved to Kyoto Purple Sanga. Although he played many matches until summer, he could hardly play in the match in late 2003. In 2004, he moved to J2 League club Kawasaki Frontale. Although he played many matches as substitute forward until summer, he could hardly play in the match in late 2004. In 2005, he moved to Tokyo Verdy. He played many matches as substitute from summer. He retired end of 2005 season.

== Career statistics ==
Appearances and goals by club, season and competition
| Club | Season | League | | | Emperor's Cup | | J.League Cup | | Total | |
| Club | Season | Division | Apps | Goals | Apps | Goals | Apps | Goals | Apps | Goals |
|---|---|---|---|---|---|---|---|---|---|---|
| Kashiwa Reysol | 2000 | J1 League | 0 | 0 | 0 | 0 | 0 | 0 | 0 | 0 |
| Kashiwa Reysol | 2001 | J1 League | 7 | 2 | 1 | 0 | 0 | 0 | 8 | 2 |
| Kashiwa Reysol | 2002 | J1 League | 3 | 0 | 0 | 0 | 6 | 0 | 9 | 0 |
| Kyoto Purple Sanga | 2003 | J1 League | 14 | 4 | 0 | 0 | 2 | 0 | 16 | 4 |
| Kawasaki Frontale | 2004 | J2 League | 16 | 2 | 0 | 0 | — | | 16 | 2 |
| Tokyo Verdy | 2005 | J1 League | 11 | 2 | 0 | 0 | 1 | 0 | 12 | 2 |
| Career total | | | 51 | 10 | 1 | 0 | 9 | 0 | 61 | 10 |
