= 2002 Tokyo Verdy 1969 season =

Tokyo Verdy 1969
2002 season
- Manager: Yukitaka Omi; Lori
- Stadium: Tokyo Stadium
- J. League 1: 10th
- Emperor's Cup: 3rd Round
- J. League Cup: GL-B 3rd
- Top goalscorer: Edmundo (16)
Home colours	Away colours

2002 Tokyo Verdy 1969 season

== Competitions ==
Competitions	Position
J. League 1	10th / 16 clubs
Emperor's Cup	3rd Round
J. League Cup	GL-B 3rd / 4 clubs

== Domestic results ==
=== J. League 1 ===
Match	Date	Venue	Opponents	Score
1-1	2002.3.3	Sendai Stadium	Vegalta Sendai	0-1
1-2	2002.3.10	Tokyo Stadium	Júbilo Iwata	2-3
1-3	2002.3.16	Mizuho Athletic Stadium	Nagoya Grampus Eight	0-1
1-4	2002.3.31	National Olympic Stadium (Tokyo)	Kashiwa Reysol	0-1
1-5	2002.4.6	Nishikyogoku Athletic Stadium	Kyoto Purple Sanga	1-5
1-6	2002.4.13	Tokyo Stadium	Vissel Kobe	1-1 a.e.t.
1-7	2002.4.20	Tokyo Stadium	Urawa Red Diamonds	2-1 a.e.t. (sudden death)
1-8	2002.7.13	Kashima Soccer Stadium	Kashima Antlers	0-1
1-9	2002.7.21	National Olympic Stadium (Tokyo)	Yokohama F. Marinos	1-2
1-10	2002.7.24	Tokyo Stadium	F.C. Tokyo	2-1
1-11	2002.7.27	Nihondaira Sports Stadium	Shimizu S-Pulse	2-1
1-12	2002.8.3	Tokyo Stadium	JEF United Ichihara	1-2
1-13	2002.8.7	Osaka Expo '70 Stadium	Gamba Osaka	0-3
1-14	2002.8.10	Tokyo Stadium	Sanfrecce Hiroshima	1-0 a.e.t. (sudden death)
1-15	2002.8.17	Sapporo Dome	Consadole Sapporo	2-1 a.e.t. (sudden death)
2-1	2002.8.31	Tokyo Stadium	Kyoto Purple Sanga	5-0
2-2	2002.9.8	Kobe Universiade Memorial Stadium	Vissel Kobe	2-0
2-3	2002.9.15	National Olympic Stadium (Tokyo)	Kashima Antlers	2-3
2-4	2002.9.18	Tokyo Stadium	F.C. Tokyo	1-2
2-5	2002.9.21	Tokyo Stadium	Yokohama F. Marinos	1-1 a.e.t.
2-6	2002.9.28	Tokyo Stadium	Nagoya Grampus Eight	3-2
2-7	2002.10.5	Ichihara Seaside Stadium	JEF United Ichihara	2-0
2-8	2002.10.12	Tokyo Stadium	Shimizu S-Pulse	2-0
2-9	2002.10.19	Hiroshima Big Arch	Sanfrecce Hiroshima	0-0 a.e.t.
2-10	2002.10.23	Tokyo Stadium	Gamba Osaka	0-3
2-11	2002.10.27	Urawa Komaba Stadium	Urawa Red Diamonds	1-0 a.e.t. (sudden death)
2-12	2002.11.9	Tokyo Stadium	Consadole Sapporo	3-2 a.e.t. (sudden death)
2-13	2002.11.17	Hitachi Kashiwa Soccer Stadium	Kashiwa Reysol	1-4
2-14	2002.11.23	Yamaha Stadium	Júbilo Iwata	0-1 a.e.t. (sudden death)
2-15	2002.11.30	Tokyo Stadium	Vegalta Sendai	3-1

=== Emperor's Cup ===
15 December 2002 Third Round	Tokyo Verdy 1969	0–2	Omiya Ardija	Tokyo
		Report	Yokoyama 40'; Usta 54'	Stadium: Tokyo Stadium; Attendance: 2,561

=== J. League Cup ===
Pos	Team	Pld	W	D	L	GF	GA	GD	Pts	Qualification
1	FC Tokyo	6	4	1	1	8	3	+5	13	Quarterfinals
2	Shimizu S-Pulse	6	4	0	2	9	8	+1	12	Quarterfinals
3	Tokyo Verdy 1969	6	2	1	3	10	10	0	7	
4	Vissel Kobe	6	0	2	4	5	11	−6	2	

Source: rsssf.com

27 April 2002 Matchday 1	Vissel Kobe	1–1	Tokyo Verdy 1969	Kobe
15:00	Daniel 49'	Report	Marquinhos 30'	Stadium: Kobe Wing Stadium; Attendance: 12,061; Referee: Yoshitsugu Katayama

30 April 2002 Matchday 2	Tokyo Verdy 1969	0–1	FC Tokyo	Tokyo
19:00		Report	Miyazawa 41'	Stadium: Tokyo Stadium; Attendance: 5,373; Referee: Kiyoshi Ota

3 May 2002 Matchday 3	Tokyo Verdy 1969	2–0	Shimizu S-Pulse	Tokyo
15:00	Hiramoto 47'; Edmundo 79'	Report		Stadium: Tokyo Stadium; Attendance: 7,561; Referee: Kazuhiko Matsumura

6 May 2002 Matchday 4	Shimizu S-Pulse	3–1	Tokyo Verdy 1969	Shizuoka
15:04	Baron 41'; Sawanobori 57'; Ota 89'	Report	Yamada 12'	Stadium: Kusanagi Athletic Stadium; Attendance: 9,681; Referee: Yoshitsugu Katayama

9 May 2002 Matchday 5	FC Tokyo	2–1	Tokyo Verdy 1969	Tokyo
19:00	Amaral 64'; Miyazawa 87'	Report	Edmundo 57'	Stadium: National Stadium; Attendance: 6,585; Referee: Hiroyuki Umemoto

12 May 2002 Matchday 6	Tokyo Verdy 1969	5–3	Vissel Kobe	Aomori
13:01	Edmundo 9', 40', 54'; Takaki 34'; Hiramoto 74'	Report	Sidiclei 67', 88'; Jo 75'	Stadium: Aomori Stadium; Attendance: 3,418; Referee: Naotsugu Fuse

== International results ==
26 May 2002 International friendly	Mexico	2–0	Tokyo Verdy 1969	Mikuni
	Luna 7'; Palencia 87'	Report		Stadium: Technoport Fukui Stadium

== Player statistics ==
No.	Pos.	Player	D.o.B. (Age)	Height / Weight	J. League 1		Emperor's Cup		J. League Cup		Total	
No.	Pos.	Player	D.o.B. (Age)	Height / Weight	Apps	Goals	Apps	Goals	Apps	Goals	Apps	Goals
1	GK	Daijiro Takakuwa	August 10, 1973 (aged 28)	cm / kg	12	0						
2	DF	Takuya Yamada	August 24, 1974 (aged 27)	cm / kg	28	1						
3	DF	Yoshihiro Nishida	January 30, 1973 (aged 29)	cm / kg	3	0						
3	FW	Hayato Yano	October 29, 1980 (aged 21)	cm / kg	4	0						
4	MF	Kentaro Hayashi	August 29, 1972 (aged 29)	cm / kg	20	0						
5	DF	Toshimi Kikuchi	June 17, 1973 (aged 28)	cm / kg	3	0						
6	MF	Atsuhiro Miura	July 24, 1974 (aged 27)	cm / kg	8	1						
7	FW	Edmundo	April 2, 1971 (aged 30)	cm / kg	26	16						
8	MF	Tsuyoshi Kitazawa	August 10, 1968 (aged 33)	cm / kg	4	1						
9	FW	Marquinhos	March 23, 1976 (aged 25)	cm / kg	15	2						
10	MF	Hideki Nagai	January 26, 1971 (aged 31)	cm / kg	11	2						
11	MF	Masakiyo Maezono	October 29, 1973 (aged 28)	cm / kg	0	0						
12	GK	Takahiro Shibasaki	May 23, 1982 (aged 19)	cm / kg	2	0						
13	FW	Keiji Ishizuka	August 26, 1974 (aged 27)	cm / kg	5	0						
14	DF	Seitaro Tomisawa	July 8, 1982 (aged 19)	cm / kg	10	0						
15	DF	Koichi Sugiyama	October 27, 1971 (aged 30)	cm / kg	1	0						
16	FW	Naoto Sakurai	September 2, 1975 (aged 26)	cm / kg	24	4						
17	DF	Naoki Soma	July 19, 1971 (aged 30)	cm / kg	27	0						
18	DF	Takumi Hayama	May 20, 1978 (aged 23)	cm / kg	5	1						
19	MF	Michiyasu Osada	March 5, 1978 (aged 23)	cm / kg	7	0						
20	MF	Narita Takaki	April 5, 1977 (aged 24)	cm / kg	14	0						
21	GK	Yoshinari Takagi	May 20, 1979 (aged 22)	cm / kg	17	0						
22	DF	Alexandre Lopes	October 29, 1974 (aged 27)	cm / kg	20	2						
23	DF	Atsushi Yoneyama	November 20, 1976 (aged 25)	cm / kg	28	2						
24	DF	Takuya Kawaguchi	October 11, 1978 (aged 23)	cm / kg	8	0						
25	FW	Kazuki Hiramoto	August 18, 1981 (aged 20)	cm / kg	25	2						
27	FW	Yuya Sano	April 22, 1982 (aged 19)	cm / kg	7	0						
28	MF	Daigo Kobayashi	February 19, 1983 (aged 19)	cm / kg	21	1						
29	DF	Masayuki Yanagisawa	August 27, 1979 (aged 22)	cm / kg	15	1						
30	MF	Hiroyuki Takahashi	May 6, 1983 (aged 18)	cm / kg	1	0						
31	DF	Hayuma Tanaka	July 31, 1982 (aged 19)	cm / kg	16	2						
32	MF	Yoshiyuki Kobayashi	January 27, 1978 (aged 24)	cm / kg	23	1						
33	MF	Jun Tamano	June 19, 1984 (aged 17)	cm / kg	5	1						

== Other pages ==
- (in Japanese) J. League official site
