= Alexandre Lopes =

Brazilian footballer (born 1974)

Personal information
- Full name: Alexandre Paes Lopes
- Date of birth: 29 October 1974 (age 51)
- Place of birth: Rio de Janeiro, Brazil
- Height: 1.86 m (6 ft 1 in)
- Position: Defender

Team information
- Current team: Tuna Luso (head coach)

Senior career*
Years	Team	Apps	(Gls)
1992–1995	Criciúma	102	(10)
1996–1997	Corinthians		
1997–1998	Sport Recife		
1999–2000	Fluminense		
2000–2001	Spartak Moscow	0	(0)
2001–2002	Goiás		
2002	Vitória		
2002	Mirassol		
2002–2003	Tokyo Verdy		
2004	Internacional		
2005	Portuguesa	6	(0)
2006	Criciúma	0	(0)
2008	Guarani de Palhoça		

International career
1995–1996	Brazil	3	(0)

Managerial career
- 2018–2019: Fluminense U16
- 2020–2021: Fluminense U20 (assistant)
- 2022: Monsoon
- 2023: Ferroviária U20
- 2023–2024: Ferroviária
- 2024: Hercílio Luz
- 2024–2025: CRAC
- 2025: Uberlândia
- 2025: Atlético Tubarão
- 2025–: Tuna Luso
- * Club domestic league appearances and goals

Alexandre Paes Lopes (born 29 October 1974) is a Brazilian football coach and former player who played as a defender. He is the current head coach of Tuna Luso.

Lopes played for the Brazil national team at 1996 CONCACAF Gold Cup.

== Career statistics ==
=== Club ===
Club performance			League	
Season	Club	League	Apps	Goals
Brazil			League	
1994	Criciúma	Série A	9	2
1995	Criciúma	Série A	21	1
1996	Corinthians Paulista	Série A	11	1
1997	Corinthians Paulista	Série A	0	0
1997	Sport Recife	Série A	19	1
1998	Sport Recife	Série A	23	0
1999	Fluminense		0	0
2000	Fluminense	Série A	0	0
2001	Goiás	Série A	10	2
Russia			League	
2001	Spartak Moscow	Top Division	1	0
Japan			League	
2002	Tokyo Verdy	J1 League	20	2
2003	Tokyo Verdy	J1 League	22	1
Brazil			League	
2004	Internacional	Série A	9	0
2005	Portuguesa Desportos	Série B	0	0
2006	Criciúma	Série C	0	0
Country	Brazil		102	7
Country	Russia		1	0
Country	Japan		42	3
Total			145	10

=== International ===
Brazil national team
Year	Apps	Goals
1995	1	0
1996	2	0
Total	3	0
