= 2001 Tokyo Verdy 1969 season =

Tokyo Verdy 1969
2001 season
- Manager: Yasutaro Matsuki; Yukitaka Omi
- Stadium: Tokyo Stadium
- J.League 1: 14th
- Emperor's Cup: Quarterfinals
- J.League Cup: 1st Round
- Top goalscorer: Marquinhos (8)
Home colours	Away colours

2001 Tokyo Verdy 1969 season

== Competitions ==
Competitions	Position
J.League 1	14th / 16 clubs
Emperor's Cup	Quarterfinals
J.League Cup	1st round

== Domestic results ==
=== J.League 1 ===
10 March 2001 1-1	FC Tokyo	2-1 (GG) (a.e.t.)	Tokyo Verdy 1969	Tokyo Stadium
JST (UTC+09)

17 March 2001 1-2	Tokyo Verdy 1969	2-1 (GG) (a.e.t.)	Kashima Antlers	Tokyo Stadium
JST (UTC+09)

31 March 2001 1-3	Tokyo Verdy 1969	1-2	Shimizu S-Pulse	Tokyo Stadium
JST (UTC+09)

7 April 2001 1-4	Consadole Sapporo	2-0	Tokyo Verdy 1969	Muroran Irie Stadium
JST (UTC+09)

14 April 2001 1-5	Tokyo Verdy 1969	1-0	Kashiwa Reysol	Tokyo Stadium
JST (UTC+09)

29 April 2001 1-6	Avispa Fukuoka	1-0	Tokyo Verdy 1969	Hakatanomori Football Stadium
JST (UTC+09)

3 May 2001 1-7	Tokyo Verdy 1969	2-3	Yokohama F. Marinos	Tokyo Stadium
JST (UTC+09)

6 May 2001 1-8	Urawa Red Diamonds	4-2	Tokyo Verdy 1969	Urawa Komaba Stadium
JST (UTC+09)

12 May 2001 1-9	Tokyo Verdy 1969	1-2	JEF United Ichihara	Tokyo Stadium
JST (UTC+09)

19 May 2001 1-10	Sanfrecce Hiroshima	3-2 (GG) (a.e.t.)	Tokyo Verdy 1969	Hiroshima Stadium
JST (UTC+09)

16 June 2001 1-11	Tokyo Verdy 1969	2-1	Cerezo Osaka	Tokyo Stadium
JST (UTC+09)

23 June 2001 1-12	Tokyo Verdy 1969	1-0 (GG) (a.e.t.)	Vissel Kobe	Tokyo Stadium
JST (UTC+09)

7 July 2001 1-13	Gamba Osaka	5-0	Tokyo Verdy 1969	Osaka Expo '70 Stadium
JST (UTC+09)

14 July 2001 1-14	Júbilo Iwata	2-1 (GG) (a.e.t.)	Tokyo Verdy 1969	Júbilo Iwata Stadium
JST (UTC+09)

21 July 2001 1-15	Tokyo Verdy 1969	0-3	Nagoya Grampus Eight	Tokyo Stadium
JST (UTC+09)

11 August 2001 2-1	JEF United Ichihara	3-1	Tokyo Verdy 1969	Ichihara Seaside Stadium
JST (UTC+09)

18 August 2001 2-2	Tokyo Verdy 1969	2-1	Urawa Red Diamonds	Tokyo Stadium
JST (UTC+09)

25 August 2001 2-3	Nagoya Grampus Eight	3-2	Tokyo Verdy 1969	Mizuho Athletic Stadium
JST (UTC+09)

8 September 2001 2-4	Tokyo Verdy 1969	1-2 (GG) (a.e.t.)	Júbilo Iwata	Tokyo Stadium
JST (UTC+09)

15 September 2001 2-5	Yokohama F. Marinos	1-2	Tokyo Verdy 1969	Tokyo National Stadium
JST (UTC+09)

22 September 2001 2-6	Tokyo Verdy 1969	0-3	Avispa Fukuoka	Tokyo Stadium
JST (UTC+09)

29 September 2001 2-7	Kashiwa Reysol	1-1 (GG) (a.e.t.)	Tokyo Verdy 1969	Hitachi Kashiwa Soccer Stadium
JST (UTC+09)

13 October 2001 2-8	Tokyo Verdy 1969	0-1	Consadole Sapporo	Tokyo Stadium
JST (UTC+09)

17 October 2001 2-9	Shimizu S-Pulse	3-2 (GG) (a.e.t.)	Tokyo Verdy 1969	Kusanagi Athletic Stadium
JST (UTC+09)

20 October 2001 2-10	Tokyo Verdy 1969	2-0	Sanfrecce Hiroshima	Tokyo Stadium
JST (UTC+09)

31 October 2001 2-11	Cerezo Osaka	0-3	Tokyo Verdy 1969	Osaka Nagai Stadium
JST (UTC+09)

3 November 2001 2-12	Vissel Kobe	2-2 (GG) (a.e.t.)	Tokyo Verdy 1969	Kobe Universiade Memorial Stadium
JST (UTC+09)

10 November 2001 2-13	Tokyo Verdy 1969	3-2	Gamba Osaka	Tokyo Stadium
JST (UTC+09)

17 November 2001 2-14	Kashima Antlers	4-0	Tokyo Verdy 1969	Kashima Soccer Stadium
JST (UTC+09)

24 November 2001 2-15	Tokyo Verdy 1969	1-0	FC Tokyo	Tokyo Stadium
JST (UTC+09)

=== Emperor's Cup ===
1st Round	bye

2nd Round	bye

9 December 2001 3rd Round	Tokyo Verdy 1969	2-0	Tokai University	Nishigaoka Soccer Stadium
JST (UTC+09)

16 December 2001 4th Round	Júbilo Iwata	1-3	Tokyo Verdy 1969	Kumamoto Athletics Stadium
JST (UTC+09)

24 December 2001 Quarterfinals	Tokyo Verdy 1969	0-3	Kawasaki Frontale	Tokyo Stadium
JST (UTC+09)

=== J.League Cup ===
4 April 2001 1st Round-1	Yokohama FC	1-1	Tokyo Verdy 1969	Yokohama Mitsuzawa Stadium
JST (UTC+09)

18 April 2001 1st Round-2	Tokyo Verdy 1969	0-2 (1-3 agg.)	Yokohama FC	Tokyo Stadium
JST (UTC+09)

== Player statistics ==
No.	Pos.	Nat.	Player	D.o.B. (Age)	Height / Weight	J.League 1		Emperor's Cup		J.League Cup		Total	
No.	Pos.	Nat.	Player	D.o.B. (Age)	Height / Weight	Apps	Goals	Apps	Goals	Apps	Goals	Apps	Goals
1	GK	(Japan)	Shinkichi Kikuchi	April 12, 1967 (aged 33)	cm / kg	16	0						
2	DF	(Japan)	Takuya Yamada	August 24, 1974 (aged 26)	cm / kg	29	2						
3	DF	(Japan)	Yoshihiro Nishida	January 30, 1973 (aged 28)	cm / kg	26	2						
4	MF	(Japan)	Kentaro Hayashi	August 29, 1972 (aged 28)	cm / kg	17	2						
5	DF	(Japan)	Atsushi Yoneyama	November 20, 1976 (aged 24)	cm / kg	21	1						
6	MF	(Japan)	Atsuhiro Miura	July 24, 1974 (aged 26)	cm / kg	22	3						
7	MF	(Japan)	Yoshiyuki Kobayashi	January 27, 1978 (aged 23)	cm / kg	19	0						
8	MF	(Japan)	Tsuyoshi Kitazawa	August 10, 1968 (aged 32)	cm / kg	23	0						
9	FW	(Japan)	Nobuhiro Takeda	May 10, 1967 (aged 33)	cm / kg	19	2						
10	MF	(Japan)	Hideki Nagai	January 26, 1971 (aged 30)	cm / kg	20	5						
11	MF	(Japan)	Masakiyo Maezono	October 29, 1973 (aged 27)	cm / kg	13	1						
12	GK	(Japan)	Yoshinari Takagi	May 20, 1979 (aged 21)	cm / kg	0	0						
13	FW	(Japan)	Keiji Ishizuka	August 26, 1974 (aged 26)	cm / kg	13	3						
14	MF	(Japan)	Yuji Hironaga	July 25, 1975 (aged 25)	cm / kg	9	0						
15	DF	(Japan)	Koichi Sugiyama	October 27, 1971 (aged 29)	cm / kg	11	0						
16	FW	(Japan)	Naoto Sakurai	September 2, 1975 (aged 25)	cm / kg	21	3						
17	FW	(Japan)	Hayato Yano	October 29, 1980 (aged 20)	cm / kg	3	0						
18	DF	(Japan)	Toshimi Kikuchi	June 17, 1973 (aged 27)	cm / kg	14	1						
19	FW	(Japan)	Takafumi Ogura	July 6, 1973 (aged 27)	cm / kg	25	3						
20	FW	(Japan)	Kazunori Iio	February 23, 1982 (aged 19)	cm / kg	11	0						
21	GK	(Japan)	Kenji Honnami	June 23, 1964 (aged 36)	cm / kg	15	0						
22	DF	(Japan)	Yuji Nakazawa	February 25, 1978 (aged 23)	cm / kg	26	0						
23	DF	(Japan)	Takumi Hayama	May 20, 1978 (aged 22)	cm / kg	2	0						
24	DF	(Japan)	Seitaro Tomisawa	July 8, 1982 (aged 18)	cm / kg	1	0						
25	FW	(Japan)	Kazuki Hiramoto	August 18, 1981 (aged 19)	cm / kg	7	0						
26	GK	(Japan)	Takahiro Shibasaki	May 23, 1982 (aged 18)	cm / kg	0	0						
27	FW	(Japan)	Yuya Sano	April 22, 1982 (aged 18)	cm / kg	0	0						
28	MF	(Japan)	Daigo Kobayashi	February 19, 1983 (aged 18)	cm / kg	5	0						
29	MF	(Japan)	Masakazu Senuma	September 7, 1978 (aged 22)	cm / kg	3	0						
30	DF	(Japan)	Yuki Takahashi	March 3, 1978 (aged 23)	cm / kg	0	0						
31	GK	(Japan)	Kyohei Noda	October 6, 1981 (aged 19)	cm / kg	0	0						
32	DF	(Japan)	Tadaaki Matsubara	July 2, 1977 (aged 23)	cm / kg	2	0						
33	MF	(Japan)	Takashi Mochizuki	April 19, 1978 (aged 22)	cm / kg	0	0						
33	FW	(Brazil)	Marquinhos	March 23, 1976 (aged 24)	cm / kg	14	8						
34	MF	(Japan)	Kazuya Ikeda	June 23, 1978 (aged 22)	cm / kg	0	0						
35	MF	(Japan)	Taichi Kagami	April 23, 1981 (aged 19)	cm / kg	0	0						
36	MF	(Japan)	Keiji Takachi	April 23, 1980 (aged 20)	cm / kg	0	0						
36	FW	(Brazil)	Edmundo	April 2, 1971 (aged 29)	cm / kg	5	2						
37	MF	(Japan)	Toshiharu Morinaga	February 3, 1982 (aged 19)	cm / kg	0	0						
38	MF	(Japan)	Hiroshi Miyaji	June 13, 1978 (aged 22)	cm / kg	0	0						
39	MF	(Japan)	Shu Nagai	May 26, 1980 (aged 20)	cm / kg	0	0						
40	MF	(Japan)	Shinya Matsushita	April 5, 1979 (aged 21)	cm / kg	0	0						
41	MF	(Japan)	Shinya Fujita	January 7, 1980 (aged 21)	cm / kg	0	0						
42	FW	(Japan)	Tatsunori Endo	October 6, 1980 (aged 20)	cm / kg	0	0						
43	FW	(Japan)	Takashi Seki	June 5, 1978 (aged 22)	cm / kg	3	0						
44	FW	(Japan)	Hiroyuki Ishida	August 31, 1979 (aged 21)	cm / kg	0	0						
44	DF	(Brazil)	Emerson	March 2, 1973 (aged 28)	cm / kg	7	0						
