= Seitaro Tomisawa =

Japanese footballer

Seitaro Tomisawa 富澤 清太郎
Personal information
- Full name: Seitaro Tomisawa
- Date of birth: July 8, 1982 (age 44)
- Place of birth: Tokyo, Japan
- Height: 1.81 m (5 ft 11 1/2 in)
- Positions: Defender; midfielder

Youth career
- 1998–2000: Verdy Kawasaki

Senior career*
Years	Team	Apps	(Gls)
2001–2011	Tokyo Verdy	184	(7)
2005	→ Vegalta Sendai (loan)	14	(0)
2012–2015	Yokohama F. Marinos	85	(9)
2015–2016	JEF United Chiba	41	(3)
2017–2018	Albirex Niigata	44	(0)
2019–2021	SC Sagamihara	16	(3)
2021	Tokyo Verdy		
Total		384	(22)
Medal record
Tokyo Verdy
Winner	Emperor's Cup	2004
Yokohama F. Marinos
Runner-up	J1 League	2013
Winner	Emperor's Cup	2013
- * Club domestic league appearances and goals as of 1 January 2020

Seitaro Tomisawa (富澤 清太郎, Tomisawa Seitaro; born July 8, 1982) is a Japanese football player who plays for Tokyo Verdy.

== Playing career ==
Tomisawa was born in Tokyo on July 8, 1982. He joined J1 League club Tokyo Verdy (formerly Verdy Kawasaki) from youth team in 2001. Although he debuted in 2001 and played as center back until 2004, he could not play many matches.

In 2005, Tomisawa moved to J2 League club Vegalta Sendai on loan. He became a regular player from April. However he could not play at all in the match for injury from July.

In 2006, Tomisawa returned to Verdy which was relegated to J2 from 2006. From July, he played many matches as center back and Verdy was promoted to J1 end of 2007 season. In 2008 season, he played many matches as defensive midfielder and side back. However Verdy was relegated to J2 in a year. Although he played as regular player until 2010, his opportunity to play decreased in 2011.

In 2012, Tomisawa moved to J1 club Yokohama F. Marinos. He became a regular player as defensive midfielder and Marinos won the 2nd place in 2013 J1 League and the champions in 2013 Emperor's Cup.

In July 2015, Tomisawa moved to J2 club JEF United Chiba. He played many matches as center back in 2015 and defensive midfielder in 2016.

In 2017, Tomisawa moved to J1 club Albirex Niigata. Although he played many matches, Albirex was relegated to J2 end of the 2017 season.

In 2019, Tomisawa moved to J3 League club SC Sagamihara.

== Club statistics ==
As of 1 January 2020.

Club performance			League		Cup		League Cup		Total	
Season	Club	League	Apps	Goals	Apps	Goals	Apps	Goals	Apps	Goals
Japan			League		Emperor's Cup		J.League Cup		Total	
2001	Tokyo Verdy	J1 League	1	0	1	0	0	0	2	0
2002	Tokyo Verdy	J1 League	10	0	0	0	2	0	12	0
2003	Tokyo Verdy	J1 League	6	0	2	0	3	0	11	0
2004	Tokyo Verdy	J1 League	1	0	4	0	1	0	6	0
Total			18	0	7	0	6	0	31	0
2005	Vegalta Sendai	J2 League	14	0	0	0	-		14	0
Total			14	0	0	0	-		14	0
2006	Tokyo Verdy	J1 League	18	3	0	0	-		18	3
2007	Tokyo Verdy	J1 League	30	1	1	0	-		31	1
2008	Tokyo Verdy	J1 League	25	1	1	0	6	0	32	1
2009	Tokyo Verdy	J2 League	45	0	1	0	-		46	0
2010	Tokyo Verdy	J2 League	31	2	0	0	-		31	2
2011	Tokyo Verdy	J2 League	17	0	2	0	-		19	0
Total			166	7	5	0	6	0	177	7
2012	Yokohama F. Marinos	J1 League	26	4	5	0	5	0	36	4
2013	Yokohama F. Marinos	J1 League	29	3	6	1	7	0	42	4
2014	Yokohama F. Marinos	J1 League	19	1	1	0	1	0	21	1
2015	Yokohama F. Marinos	J1 League	11	1	-		6	1	17	2
Total			85	9	12	1	19	1	116	11
2015	JEF United Chiba	J2 League	20	0	0	0	-		20	0
2016	JEF United Chiba	J2 League	21	3	1	0	-		22	3
Total			41	3	1	0	-		42	3
2017	Albirex Niigata	J1 League	24	0	1	0	0	0	25	0
2018	Albirex Niigata	J2 League	20	0	0	0	1	0	21	0
Total			44	0	1	0	1	0	46	0
2019	SC Sagamihara	J3 League	16	3	-		-		16	3
Total			16	3	-		-		16	3
Career total			384	22	26	1	32	1	442	24

== Honours ==
Yokohama F. Marinos

- Emperor's Cup: 2013
