= Yoichi Doi =

Japanese footballer

Yoichi Doi 土肥 洋一
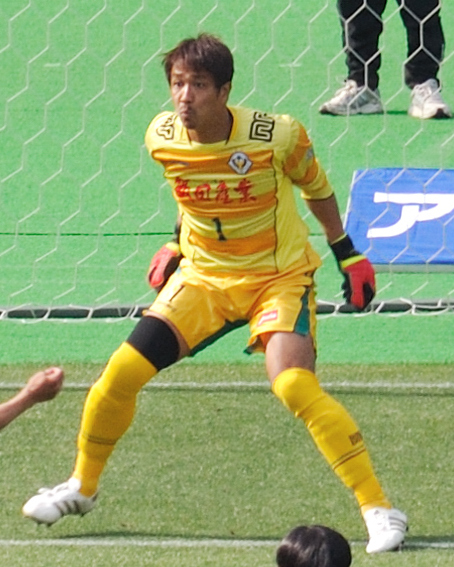
- Doi in 2011

Personal information
- Full name: Yoichi Doi
- Date of birth: 25 July 1973 (age 53)
- Place of birth: Kumamoto, Kumamoto, Japan
- Height: 1.84 m (6 ft 0 in)
- Position: Goalkeeper

Team information
- Current team: Yokohama FC (goalkeeper coach)

Youth career
- 1989–1991: Ohzu High School

Senior career*
Years	Team	Apps	(Gls)
1992–1999	Kashiwa Reysol	92	(0)
2000–2007	FC Tokyo	230	(0)
2008–2012	Tokyo Verdy	131	(0)
Total		453	(0)

International career
2003–2006	Japan	4	(0)
Medal record
Kashiwa Reysol
Winner	J.League Cup	1999
FC Tokyo
Winner	J.League Cup	2004
Representing Japan
AFC Asian Cup
Gold medal – first place	2004 China
- * Club domestic league appearances and goals

Yoichi Doi (土肥 洋一, Doi Yōichi; born 25 July 1973) is a Japanese former professional footballer who played as a goalkeeper. He played for Japan national team. He is the current goalkeeper coach of J2 League club Yokohama FC.

== Club career ==
Doi was born in Kumamoto on 25 July 1973. After graduating from high school, he joined Hitachi (later Kashiwa Reysol) in 1992. He battles with Ryuji Kato for goalkeeper position from 1997. However his opportunity to play decreased behind newcomer Yuta Minami from 1998. He moved to FC Tokyo in 2000. At 2004 J.League Cup, the club won the champions and he was selected MVP award. He played all matches from 2000 until round 32/34 in 2006 season. However his opportunity to play decreased behind Hitoshi Shiota in 2007. He moved to Tokyo Verdy with teammate Takashi Fukunishi in 2008. Although Doi played all matches in 2008 season, Verdy was relegated to J2 League. From 2011, his opportunity to play decreased behind Takahiro Shibasaki for injury in May 2011. In July 2012, Doi took regular position from Shibasaki. He retired end of 2012 season.

== International career ==
In June 2003, Doi was selected Japan national team for 2003 Confederations Cup, but he did not play in the match. On 7 February 2004, he debuted for Japan against Malaysia. He was a member of Japan for 2004 Asian Cup Japan won the champions. He played four games for Japan until 2005. Although he was selected Japan for most matches including 2006 World Cup from 2003 to 2006, he could hardly play in the match behind Yoshikatsu Kawaguchi and Seigo Narazaki.

== Career statistics ==
=== Club ===
Appearances and goals by club, season and competition
Club	Season	League			Emperor's Cup		J.League Cup		Total	
Club	Season	Division	Apps	Goals	Apps	Goals	Apps	Goals	Apps	Goals
Kashiwa Reysol (Note: "Hitachi" until 1993)	1992	Japan Football League	0	0	0	0	–		0	0
Kashiwa Reysol	1993	Japan Football League	0	0	0	0	–		0	0
Kashiwa Reysol	1994	Japan Football League	15	0	0	0	1	0	16	0
Kashiwa Reysol	1995	J1 League	17	0	2	0	–		19	0
Kashiwa Reysol	1996	J1 League	30	0	2	0	15	0	47	0
Kashiwa Reysol	1997	J1 League	19	0	3	0	8	0	30	0
Kashiwa Reysol	1998	J1 League	8	0	1	0	0	0	9	0
Kashiwa Reysol	1999	J1 League	3	0	0	0	0	0	3	0
Kashiwa Reysol	Total		92	0	8	0	24	0	124	0
FC Tokyo	2000	J1 League	30	0	0	0	2	0	32	0
FC Tokyo	2001	J1 League	30	0	1	0	3	0	34	0
FC Tokyo	2002	J1 League	30	0	1	0	7	0	38	0
FC Tokyo	2003	J1 League	30	0	2	0	6	0	38	0
FC Tokyo	2004	J1 League	30	0	3	0	1	0	34	0
FC Tokyo	2005	J1 League	34	0	2	0	0	0	36	0
FC Tokyo	2006	J1 League	32	0	0	0	2	0	34	0
FC Tokyo	2007	J1 League	14	0	0	0	4	0	18	0
FC Tokyo	Total		230	0	9	0	25	0	264	0
Tokyo Verdy	2008	J1 League	34	0	0	0	4	0	38	0
Tokyo Verdy	2009	J2 League	43	0	1	0	–		44	0
Tokyo Verdy	2010	J2 League	34	0	1	0	–		35	0
Tokyo Verdy	2011	J2 League	2	0	0	0	–		2	0
Tokyo Verdy	2012	J2 League	18	0	0	0	–		18	0
Tokyo Verdy	Total		131	0	2	0	4	0	137	0
Career total			453	0	19	0	53	0	525	0

=== International ===
Appearances and goals by national team and year
National team	Year	Apps	Goals
Japan
Japan	2003	0	0
Japan	2004	2	0
Japan	2005	2	0
Japan	2006	0	0
Total		4	0

== Honors ==
Japan

- AFC Asian Cup: 2004

Individual

- J1 League Best Eleven: 2004
