= 2003 Tokyo Verdy 1969 season =

Tokyo Verdy 1969
2003 season
- Manager: Lori Sandri; Leandro; Osvaldo Ardiles
- Stadium: Ajinomoto Stadium
- J.League 1: 8th
- Emperor's Cup: Quarterfinals
- J.League Cup: GL-A 3rd
- Top goalscorer: Mboma (13)
Home colours	Away colours

2003 Tokyo Verdy 1969 season

== Competitions ==
Competitions	Position
J.League 1	8th / 16 clubs
Emperor's Cup	Quarterfinals
J.League Cup	GL-A 3rd / 4 clubs

== Domestic results ==
=== J.League 1 ===
Match	Date	Venue	Opponents	Score
1-1	2003.3.22	Ichihara Seaside Stadium	JEF United Ichihara	1-2
1-2	2003.4.5	Ajinomoto Stadium	FC Tokyo	2-1
1-3	2003.4.12	Ajinomoto Stadium	Yokohama F. Marinos	0-3
1-4	2003.4.19	Kashima Soccer Stadium	Kashima Antlers	0-1
1-5	2003.4.26	Ajinomoto Stadium	Oita Trinita	0-2
1-6	2003.4.29	National Olympic Stadium (Tokyo)	Urawa Red Diamonds	0-2
1-7	2003.5.5	Shizuoka Stadium	Júbilo Iwata	2-7
1-8	2003.5.10	Ajinomoto Stadium	Shimizu S-Pulse	1-2
1-9	2003.5.17	Kagoshima Kamoike Stadium	Kyoto Purple Sanga	5-2
1-10	2003.5.24	Ajinomoto Stadium	Vissel Kobe	3-2
1-11	2003.7.6	Nagai Stadium	Cerezo Osaka	2-0
1-12	2003.7.12	Ajinomoto Stadium	Kashiwa Reysol	3-1
1-13	2003.7.19	Sendai Stadium	Vegalta Sendai	3-3
1-14	2003.7.26	Mizuho Athletic Stadium	Nagoya Grampus Eight	4-1
1-15	2003.8.2	Ajinomoto Stadium	Gamba Osaka	2-3
2-1	2003.8.16	International Stadium Yokohama	Yokohama F. Marinos	2-2
2-2	2003.8.24	National Olympic Stadium (Tokyo)	Kashima Antlers	1-1
2-3	2003.8.30	Nihondaira Sports Stadium	Shimizu S-Pulse	1-3
2-4	2003.9.6	Ajinomoto Stadium	Kyoto Purple Sanga	4-1
2-5	2003.9.13	Kobe Wing Stadium	Vissel Kobe	3-0
2-6	2003.9.20	Ajinomoto Stadium	Cerezo Osaka	4-2
2-7	2003.9.23	Osaka Expo '70 Stadium	Gamba Osaka	2-2
2-8	2003.9.28	Ajinomoto Stadium	Nagoya Grampus Eight	4-4
2-9	2003.10.5	Ōita Stadium	Oita Trinita	2-0
2-10	2003.10.19	Hitachi Kashiwa Soccer Stadium	Kashiwa Reysol	2-0
2-11	2003.10.25	Ajinomoto Stadium	Vegalta Sendai	0-0
2-12	2003.11.8	Urawa Komaba Stadium	Urawa Red Diamonds	1-5
2-13	2003.11.16	Ajinomoto Stadium	Júbilo Iwata	1-2
2-14	2003.11.22	Ajinomoto Stadium	FC Tokyo	1-1
2-15	2003.11.29	Ajinomoto Stadium	JEF United Ichihara	0-2

=== Emperor's Cup ===
Match	Date	Venue	Opponents	Score
3rd round	2003..			-
4th round	2003..			-
Quarterfinals	2003..			-

=== J.League Cup ===
Match	Date	Venue	Opponents	Score
GL-A-1	2003..			-
GL-A-2	2003..			-
GL-A-3	2003..			-
GL-A-4	2003..			-
GL-A-5	2003..			-
GL-A-6	2003..			-

== Player statistics ==
No.	Pos.	Player	D.o.B. (Age)	Height / Weight	J.League 1		Emperor's Cup		J.League Cup		Total	
No.	Pos.	Player	D.o.B. (Age)	Height / Weight	Apps	Goals	Apps	Goals	Apps	Goals	Apps	Goals
1	GK	Takahiro Shibasaki	May 23, 1982 (aged 20)	cm / kg	0	0						
2	DF	Takuya Yamada	August 24, 1974 (aged 28)	cm / kg	30	10						
3	DF	Alexandre Lopes	October 29, 1974 (aged 28)	cm / kg	22	1						
4	MF	Kentaro Hayashi	August 29, 1972 (aged 30)	cm / kg	29	1						
5	DF	Kentaro Suzuki	June 2, 1980 (aged 22)	cm / kg	6	0						
6	MF	Atsuhiro Miura	July 24, 1974 (aged 28)	cm / kg	26	2						
7	DF	Hayuma Tanaka	July 31, 1982 (aged 20)	cm / kg	10	0						
9	FW	Patrick M'Boma	November 15, 1970 (aged 32)	cm / kg	23	13						
10	MF	Ramon	June 30, 1972 (aged 30)	cm / kg	25	6						
11	FW	Kazuki Hiramoto	August 18, 1981 (aged 21)	cm / kg	28	5						
13	DF	Masayuki Yanagisawa	August 27, 1979 (aged 23)	cm / kg	27	1						
14	DF	Seitaro Tomisawa	July 8, 1982 (aged 20)	cm / kg	6	0						
15	MF	Takahito Soma	December 10, 1981 (aged 21)	cm / kg	1	0						
16	FW	Naoto Sakurai	September 2, 1975 (aged 27)	cm / kg	19	6						
17	MF	Daigo Kobayashi	February 19, 1983 (aged 20)	cm / kg	19	0						
18	DF	Takumi Hayama	May 20, 1978 (aged 24)	cm / kg	2	0						
19	FW	Yuya Sano	April 22, 1982 (aged 20)	cm / kg	2	0						
20	FW	Kazunori Iio	February 23, 1982 (aged 21)	cm / kg	13	2						
21	GK	Yoshinari Takagi	May 20, 1979 (aged 23)	cm / kg	30	0						
22	MF	Takashi Hirano	July 15, 1974 (aged 28)	cm / kg	25	4						
23	DF	Atsushi Yoneyama	November 20, 1976 (aged 26)	cm / kg	23	0						
24	MF	Hiroyuki Takahashi	May 6, 1983 (aged 19)	cm / kg	0	0						
25	MF	Shingo Nejime	December 22, 1984 (aged 18)	cm / kg	15	1						
27	MF	Masatomo Kuba	November 21, 1984 (aged 18)	cm / kg	0	0						
30	DF	Yugo Ichiyanagi	April 2, 1985 (aged 17)	cm / kg	6	1						
32	MF	Yoshiyuki Kobayashi	January 27, 1978 (aged 25)	cm / kg	18	1						
33	MF	Jun Tamano	June 19, 1984 (aged 18)	cm / kg	3	1						
34	FW	Akira Takabe	May 9, 1982 (aged 20)	cm / kg	2	0						
34	DF	Kenta Togawa	June 23, 1981 (aged 21)	cm / kg	0	0						

== Other pages ==
- (in Japanese) J. League official site
