= Daigo Kobayashi =

Japanese footballer

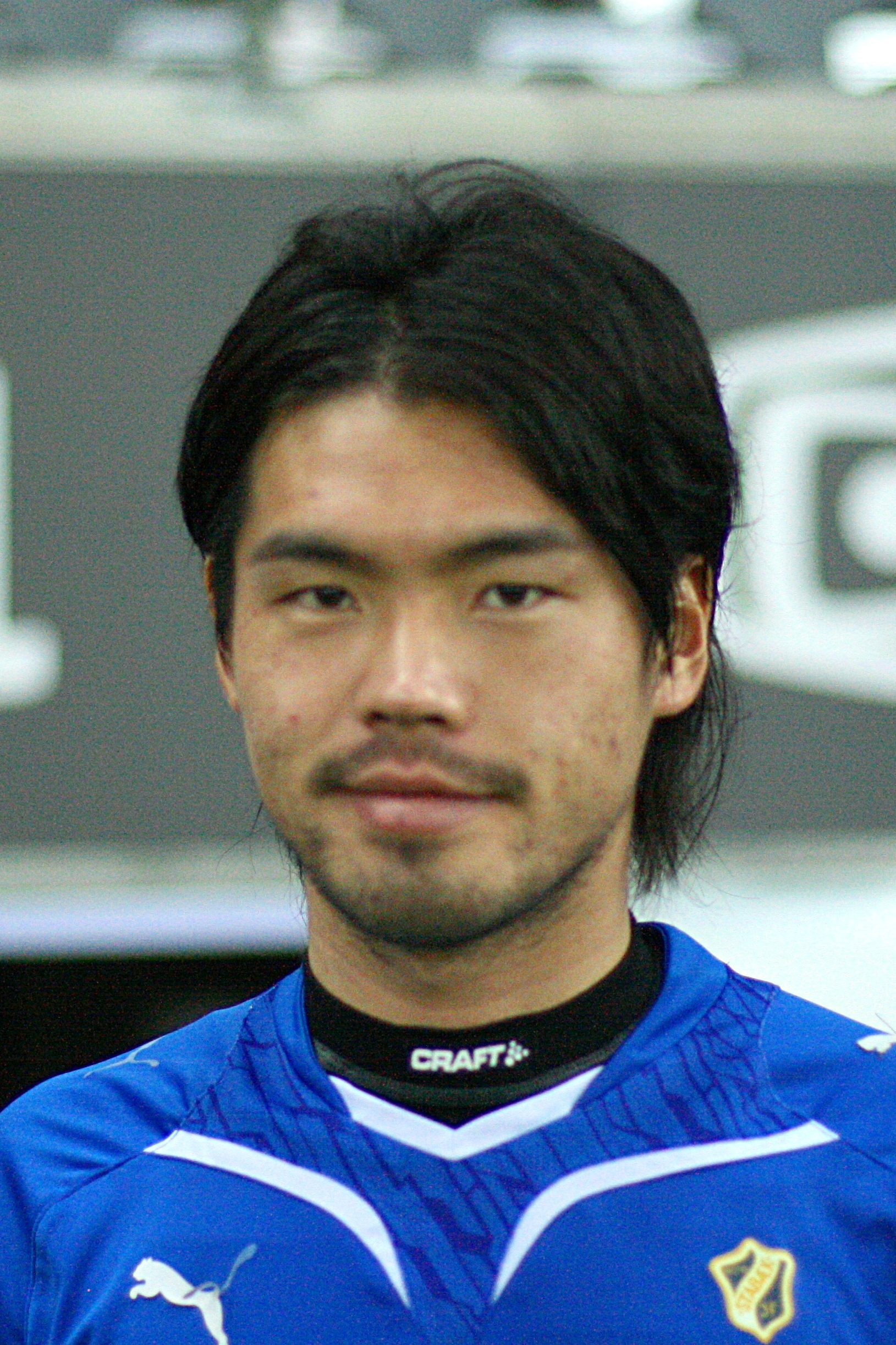
- Daigo Kobayashi with Stabæk in 2009

Personal information
- Date of birth: 19 February 1983 (age 43)
- Place of birth: Fuji, Shizuoka, Japan
- Height: 1.78 m (5 ft 10 in)
- Position: Midfielder

Youth career
- 1998–2000: Shimizu Commercial High School

Senior career*
Years	Team	Apps	(Gls)
2001–2005	Tokyo Verdy	104	(4)
2006–2008	Omiya Ardija	90	(14)
2009	→ Stabæk (loan)	29	(8)
2010	Iraklis	14	(0)
2011–2012	Shimizu S-Pulse	29	(0)
2013	Vancouver Whitecaps FC	30	(2)
2014–2017	New England Revolution	94	(2)
2018	Las Vegas Lights	32	(4)
2019–2021	Birmingham Legion	41	(0)

International career
2003	Japan U-20	4	(0)
2006	Japan	1	(0)
Medal record
Tokyo Verdy
Winner	Emperor's Cup	2004
Shimizu S-Pulse
Runner-up	J.League Cup	2012
Representing Japan
AFC U-19 Championship
Silver medal – second place	2002
- * Club domestic league appearances and goals as of 5 November 2021

Daigo Kobayashi (小林 大悟, Kobayashi Daigo; born 19 February 1983) is a Japanese professional footballer who plays as a midfielder.

== Club career ==
Kobayashi started up his professional career at Tokyo Verdy where he won the 2004 Emperor's Cup and the 2005 Japanese Super Cup. In the same year, they were relegated from the J1 League, which marked his end in Tokyo. He signed for Omiya Ardija at the start of the 2006 season and quickly became their star player.

The club's successes were limited and after the 2008 season, he was offered the chance to go on trial at the Norwegian club Stabæk. His trial was a success, and in February 2009 he was loaned out to the Norwegian champions. He was given the number 10 shirt, which had recently been worn by Veigar Páll Gunnarsson. On 8 March, he made his official debut for Stabæk in the 2009 Super Cup. The league champions won 3–1 against cup champions Vålerenga. Kobayashi played an important part, getting on the score-sheet with a free kick and showing trickery with the ball. Stabæk decided not to buy him at the end of the season. On 27 January 2010, Kobayashi signed on a free transfer to the Greek club Iraklis for 18 months. Kobayashi only appeared in 15 matches for Iraklis. At the end of the 2010–11 season he returned to Japan, signing a deal with Shimizu S-Pulse.

During January 2013 he went on trial with Vancouver Whitecaps FC in the MLS. He impressed during his trial stint and signed with the club for the 2013 season. The club declined to offer him a contract for the 2014 season and his rights were traded to the New England Revolution before the start of the season in exchange for a fourth-round pick in the 2016 MLS SuperDraft. In late 2015, Kobayashi received his U.S. green card, which qualified him as a domestic player for MLS roster purposes. In March 2018, Kobayashi joined Las Vegas Lights FC. In January 2019, Kobayashi signed with Birmingham Legion FC.

== International career ==
Kobayashi represented Japan U-20 national team at the World Youth Championship in 2003, where they reached the quarter-finals before being beaten by eventual champions Brazil. He did not start their first group game, a loss against Colombia, but he started the next two which they won to secure a top spot, including a win against England. He further played in the round of 16 win against South Korea, but had to be replaced early in the quarter finals. He also represented Japan U20 at the AFC Youth Championship in 2002, where they came second, after losing 1–0 in against South Korea in the final.

He earned his first cap for Japan in a friendly match against Trinidad and Tobago on 9 August 2006, coming on as a 56th-minute substitute for Koji Yamase.

== Career statistics ==
=== Club ===
As of 2 August 2019

Appearances and goals by club, season and competition
Club	Season	League			National cup (Note: Includes Emperor's Cup, Norwegian Football Cup, Greek Football Cup, Canadian Championship, and U.S. Open Cup.)		League cup (Note: Includes J.League Cup.)		Continental		Other		Total	
Club	Season	Division	Apps	Goals	Apps	Goals	Apps	Goals	Apps	Goals	Apps	Goals	Apps	Goals
Tokyo Verdy	2001	J1 League	5	0	0	0	0	0	–		–		5	0
Tokyo Verdy	2002	J1 League	21	1	1	0	6	0	–		–		28	1
Tokyo Verdy	2003	J1 League	19	0	2	0	5	0	–		–		26	0
Tokyo Verdy	2004	J1 League	27	0	5	0	7	4	–		–		39	4
Tokyo Verdy	2005	J1 League	32	3	1	1	5	1	–		1 (Note: Appearance in the Japanese Super Cup)	0	39	5
Tokyo Verdy	Total		104	4	9	1	23	5	0	0	1	0	137	10
Omiya Ardija	2006	J1 League	33	9	2	0	5	1	–		–		40	10
Omiya Ardija	2007	J1 League	24	2	1	0	3	1	–		–		28	3
Omiya Ardija	2008	J1 League	33	3	1	0	6	1	–		–		40	4
Omiya Ardija	Total		90	14	4	0	14	3	0	0	0	0	108	17
Stabæk (loan)	2009	Tippeligaen	29	8	4	3	–		6 (Note: Four appearances and one goal in the UEFA Champions League, two appearances in the UEFA Europa League)	1	1 (Note: Appearance in the Superfinalen)	1	40	13
Iraklis	2009–10	Super League Greece	8	0	0	0	–		–		–		8	0
Iraklis	2010–11	Super League Greece	6	0	1	0	–		–		–		7	0
Iraklis	Total		14	0	1	0	0	0	0	0	0	0	15	0
Shimizu S-Pulse	2011	J1 League	12	0	0	0	1	0	–		–		13	0
Shimizu S-Pulse	2012	J1 League	17	0	1	0	7	2	–		–		25	2
Shimizu S-Pulse	Total		29	0	1	0	8	2	0	0	0	0	38	2
Vancouver Whitecaps FC	2013	MLS	30	2	2	1	–		–		–		32	3
New England Revolution	2014	MLS	34	0	2	0	–		–		3 (Note: Appearances in the MLS Cup Playoffs)	0	39	0
New England Revolution	2015	MLS	21	0	1	0	–		–		1	0	23	0
New England Revolution	2016	MLS	27	1	1	0	–		–		–		28	1
New England Revolution	2017	MLS	12	1	1	0	–		–		–		13	1
New England Revolution	Total		94	2	5	0	0	0	0	0	4	0	103	2
Las Vegas Lights	2018	USL	32	4	2	0	–		–		–		34	4
Birmingham Legion	2019	USL Championship	18	0	1	0	–		–		0	0	19	0
Career total			440	34	29	5	45	10	6	1	6	1	526	51

=== International ===
Japan
Year	Apps	Goals
2006	1	0
Total	1	0

== Honours ==
Tokyo Verdy

- Emperor's Cup: 2004
- Japanese Super Cup: 2005

Stabæk

- Superfinalen: 2009

Japan

- AFC Youth Championship runner-up: 2002

New England Revolution

- MLS Eastern Conference (Playoff): 2014

Individual

- J.League All-Star Soccer selected: 2006, 2007
