= 2016 Tokyo Verdy season =

Tokyo Verdy
2016 season
- Manager: Koichi Togashi
- Stadium: Ajinomoto Stadium
- J2 League: 18th

2016 Tokyo Verdy season.

== J2 League ==
=== League table ===
Pos	Team	Pld	W	D	L	GF	GA	GD	Pts
17	Thespakusatsu Gunma	42	11	12	19	52	66	−14	45
18	Tokyo Verdy	42	10	13	19	43	61	−18	43
19	Kamatamare Sanuki	42	10	13	19	43	62	−19	43

Updated to match(es) played on 20 November 2016. Source: 2016 MEIJI YASUDA J2 LEAGUE League table
Rules for classification: 1) Points; 2) Goal difference; 3) Goals scored

=== Match details ===
J2 League match details
Match	Date	Team	Score	Team	Venue	Attendance
1	2016.02.28	Tokyo Verdy	1-0	Hokkaido Consadole Sapporo	Ajinomoto Stadium	9,272
2	2016.03.06	Kamatamare Sanuki	2-1	Tokyo Verdy	Pikara Stadium	2,858
3	2016.03.13	Roasso Kumamoto	1-0	Tokyo Verdy	Umakana-Yokana Stadium	5,902
4	2016.03.20	Tokyo Verdy	1-0	Tokushima Vortis	Ajinomoto Stadium	3,813
5	2016.03.26	Tokyo Verdy	0-1	FC Machida Zelvia	Ajinomoto Stadium	5,166
6	2016.04.03	Fagiano Okayama	1-1	Tokyo Verdy	City Light Stadium	7,184
7	2016.04.10	Tokyo Verdy	0-0	V-Varen Nagasaki	Komazawa Olympic Park Stadium	2,752
8	2016.04.17	Yokohama FC	1-1	Tokyo Verdy	NHK Spring Mitsuzawa Football Stadium	3,238
9	2016.04.23	Tokyo Verdy	0-3	Mito HollyHock	Komazawa Olympic Park Stadium	3,999
10	2016.04.29	Thespakusatsu Gunma	2-2	Tokyo Verdy	Shoda Shoyu Stadium Gunma	3,234
11	2016.05.03	Tokyo Verdy	0-1	Montedio Yamagata	Ajinomoto Stadium	5,515
12	2016.05.07	Tokyo Verdy	0-4	Matsumoto Yamaga FC	Ajinomoto Stadium	8,664
13	2016.05.15	Zweigen Kanazawa	1-1	Tokyo Verdy	Ishikawa Athletics Stadium	3,902
14	2016.05.22	Tokyo Verdy	2-1	Shimizu S-Pulse	Ajinomoto Stadium	8,792
15	2016.05.29	Ehime FC	0-0	Tokyo Verdy	Ningineer Stadium	2,019
16	2016.06.04	Renofa Yamaguchi FC	3-1	Tokyo Verdy	Ishin Memorial Park Stadium	4,909
17	2016.06.08	Tokyo Verdy	1-1	FC Gifu	Ajinomoto Field Nishigaoka	3,120
18	2016.06.12	JEF United Chiba	2-2	Tokyo Verdy	Fukuda Denshi Arena	11,196
19	2016.06.19	Tokyo Verdy	2-1	Kyoto Sanga FC	Ajinomoto Stadium	4,209
20	2016.06.26	Cerezo Osaka	1-0	Tokyo Verdy	Kincho Stadium	10,171
21	2016.07.03	Giravanz Kitakyushu	2-1	Tokyo Verdy	Honjo Stadium	2,864
22	2016.07.10	Tokyo Verdy	2-1	Fagiano Okayama	Ajinomoto Stadium	4,944
23	2016.07.16	V-Varen Nagasaki	2-1	Tokyo Verdy	Nagasaki Stadium	4,146
24	2016.07.20	Shimizu S-Pulse	0-1	Tokyo Verdy	IAI Stadium Nihondaira	7,083
25	2016.07.24	Tokyo Verdy	1-2	Thespakusatsu Gunma	Ajinomoto Stadium	3,739
26	2016.07.31	Tokyo Verdy	1-0	Roasso Kumamoto	Ajinomoto Stadium	5,723
27	2016.08.07	Kyoto Sanga FC	2-0	Tokyo Verdy	Kyoto Nishikyogoku Athletic Stadium	6,030
28	2016.08.11	Tokyo Verdy	4-1	Zweigen Kanazawa	Ajinomoto Stadium	3,658
29	2016.08.14	Tokyo Verdy	0-2	Yokohama FC	Ajinomoto Stadium	7,235
30	2016.08.21	Tokushima Vortis	3-1	Tokyo Verdy	Pocarisweat Stadium	3,618
31	2016.09.11	Mito HollyHock	1-1	Tokyo Verdy	K's denki Stadium Mito	5,631
32	2016.09.18	Tokyo Verdy	3-2	Kamatamare Sanuki	Ajinomoto Field Nishigaoka	3,347
33	2016.09.25	Tokyo Verdy	1-1	JEF United Chiba	Ajinomoto Stadium	6,121
34	2016.10.02	FC Machida Zelvia	2-1	Tokyo Verdy	Machida Stadium	5,016
35	2016.10.08	Tokyo Verdy	1-1	Giravanz Kitakyushu	Ajinomoto Stadium	4,057
36	2016.10.16	Montedio Yamagata	1-0	Tokyo Verdy	ND Soft Stadium Yamagata	5,584
37	2016.10.22	Hokkaido Consadole Sapporo	1-2	Tokyo Verdy	Sapporo Dome	18,868
38	2016.10.30	Tokyo Verdy	1-1	Ehime FC	Ajinomoto Stadium	6,931
39	2016.11.03	Tokyo Verdy	2-2	Renofa Yamaguchi FC	Ajinomoto Stadium	4,054
40	2016.11.06	Matsumoto Yamaga FC	2-0	Tokyo Verdy	Matsumotodaira Park Stadium	15,343
41	2016.11.12	Tokyo Verdy	1-2	Cerezo Osaka	Ajinomoto Stadium	8,340
42	2016.11.20	FC Gifu	4-2	Tokyo Verdy	Gifu Nagaragawa Stadium	12,158

== See also ==
- History of Tokyo Verdy
