= Tomoyuki Suzuki =

Japanese footballer (born 1985)

Personal information
- Full name: Tomoyuki Suzuki
- Date of birth: December 20, 1985 (age 40)
- Place of birth: Saitama, Japan
- Height: 1.85 m (6 ft 1 in)
- Position: Goalkeeper

Team information
- Current team: Iwate Grulla Morioka
- Number: 27

Youth career
- 2004–2007: Kokushikan University

Senior career*
Years	Team	Apps	(Gls)
2008–2010	Tokyo Verdy	0	(0)
2011–2014	Tochigi SC	42	(0)
2015–2018	Matsumoto Yamaga	14	(0)
2019	Tokyo Verdy	0	(0)
2020–	Iwate Grulla Morioka	2	(0)
- * Club domestic league appearances and goals as of 7 July 2020

Tomoyuki Suzuki (鈴木 智幸, born December 20, 1985) is a Japanese football player for Iwate Grulla Morioka.

== Club statistics ==
Updated to end of 2018 season.

Club performance			League		Cup		League Cup		Total	
Season	Club	League	Apps	Goals	Apps	Goals	Apps	Goals	Apps	Goals
Japan			League		Emperor's Cup		J. League Cup		Total	
2008	Tokyo Verdy	J1 League	0	0	0	0	0	0	0	0
2009	Tokyo Verdy	J2 League	0	0	0	0	-		0	0
2010	Tokyo Verdy	J2 League	0	0	0	0	-		0	0
2011	Tochigi SC	J2 League	6	0	0	0	-		6	0
2012	Tochigi SC	J2 League	3	0	0	0	-		3	0
2013	Tochigi SC	J2 League	3	0	1	0	-		4	0
2014	Tochigi SC	J2 League	30	0	1	0	-		31	0
2015	Matsumoto Yamaga	J1 League	0	0	0	0	3	0	3	0
2016	Matsumoto Yamaga	J2 League	0	0	0	0	–		3	0
2017	Matsumoto Yamaga	J2 League	14	0	0	0	–		14	0
2018	Matsumoto Yamaga	J2 League	0	0	1	0	–		1	0
Total			56	0	3	0	3	0	62	0
