= 2017 Tokyo Verdy season =

Tokyo Verdy
2017 season
- Manager: Miguel Ángel Lotina
- Stadium: Ajinomoto Stadium
- J2 League: 5th

2017 Tokyo Verdy season.

== J2 League ==
=== League table ===
Pos	Team	Pld	W	D	L	GF	GA	GD	Pts	Promotion, qualification or relegation
4	Avispa Fukuoka	42	21	11	10	54	36	+18	74	Qualification for promotion playoffs (Note: Only teams that meet J1 license criteria can participate in promotion playoffs. If one or more teams fail to meet the criteria, only eligible teams that finished 3rd to 6th will participate and no replacement teams will be added.)
5	Tokyo Verdy	42	20	10	12	64	49	+15	70	Qualification for promotion playoffs
6	JEF United Chiba	42	20	8	14	70	58	+12	68	Qualification for promotion playoffs

Updated to match(es) played on 28 November 2017. Source: 2017 MEIJI YASUDA J2 LEAGUE League table
Rules for classification: 1) Points; 2) Goal difference; 3) Goals scored

=== Match details ===
J2 League match details
Match	Date	Team	Score	Team	Venue	Attendance
1	2017.02.26	Tokushima Vortis	1-0	Tokyo Verdy	Pocarisweat Stadium	6,149
2	2017.03.05	Tokyo Verdy	1-0	Oita Trinita	Ajinomoto Stadium	5,749
3	2017.03.11	Tokyo Verdy	4-0	Mito HollyHock	Ajinomoto Stadium	3,296
4	2017.03.19	Renofa Yamaguchi FC	0-2	Tokyo Verdy	Ishin Memorial Park Stadium	4,583
5	2017.03.25	Tokyo Verdy	1-0	FC Gifu	Ajinomoto Stadium	3,331
6	2017.04.02	Fagiano Okayama	0-1	Tokyo Verdy	City Light Stadium	8,551
7	2017.04.09	Tokyo Verdy	2-3	Shonan Bellmare	Komazawa Olympic Park Stadium	5,879
8	2017.04.15	Montedio Yamagata	1-0	Tokyo Verdy	ND Soft Stadium Yamagata	4,677
9	2017.04.22	Tokyo Verdy	3-1	Thespakusatsu Gunma	Ajinomoto Stadium	2,786
10	2017.04.29	Avispa Fukuoka	1-0	Tokyo Verdy	Level5 Stadium	8,247
11	2017.05.03	Tokyo Verdy	2-1	Zweigen Kanazawa	Ajinomoto Field Nishigaoka	4,112
12	2017.05.07	Tokyo Verdy	1-1	Yokohama FC	Ajinomoto Stadium	9,452
13	2017.05.13	Kamatamare Sanuki	0-0	Tokyo Verdy	Pikara Stadium	2,309
14	2017.05.17	Tokyo Verdy	3-0	JEF United Chiba	Ajinomoto Stadium	4,436
15	2017.05.21	Tokyo Verdy	1-2	Kyoto Sanga FC	Ajinomoto Stadium	5,435
16	2017.05.27	V-Varen Nagasaki	1-0	Tokyo Verdy	Transcosmos Stadium Nagasaki	4,478
17	2017.06.04	Matsumoto Yamaga FC	1-1	Tokyo Verdy	Matsumotodaira Park Stadium	12,527
18	2017.06.10	Tokyo Verdy	2-1	Nagoya Grampus	Ajinomoto Stadium	12,659
19	2017.06.17	Tokyo Verdy	3-3	Ehime FC	Ajinomoto Stadium	6,057
20	2017.06.25	FC Machida Zelvia	2-4	Tokyo Verdy	Machida Stadium	4,334
21	2017.07.01	Roasso Kumamoto	4-0	Tokyo Verdy	Egao Kenko Stadium	10,208
22	2017.07.09	Tokyo Verdy	1-1	Fagiano Okayama	Ajinomoto Stadium	5,765
23	2017.07.16	Shonan Bellmare	2-0	Tokyo Verdy	Shonan BMW Stadium Hiratsuka	9,820
24	2017.07.22	Tokyo Verdy	3-3	Kamatamare Sanuki	Ajinomoto Stadium	3,980
25	2017.07.29	Mito HollyHock	3-2	Tokyo Verdy	K's denki Stadium Mito	4,515
26	2017.08.05	Zweigen Kanazawa	0-0	Tokyo Verdy	Ishikawa Athletics Stadium	4,046
27	2017.08.11	Tokyo Verdy	1-0	Roasso Kumamoto	Ajinomoto Stadium	4,372
28	2017.08.16	Oita Trinita	0-2	Tokyo Verdy	Oita Bank Dome	6,440
29	2017.08.20	Tokyo Verdy	2-1	V-Varen Nagasaki	Ajinomoto Stadium	5,025
30	2017.08.27	Ehime FC	0-3	Tokyo Verdy	Ningineer Stadium	3,173
31	2017.09.02	JEF United Chiba	2-2	Tokyo Verdy	Fukuda Denshi Arena	9,996
32	2017.09.10	Tokyo Verdy	1-2	Matsumoto Yamaga FC	Ajinomoto Stadium	9,214
33	2017.09.16	Yokohama FC	1-1	Tokyo Verdy	NHK Spring Mitsuzawa Football Stadium	4,846
34	2017.09.24	Nagoya Grampus	4-1	Tokyo Verdy	Paloma Mizuho Stadium	12,111
35	2017.10.01	Tokyo Verdy	3-1	FC Machida Zelvia	Ajinomoto Stadium	6,951
36	2017.10.07	Tokyo Verdy	3-1	Montedio Yamagata	Ajinomoto Stadium	5,355
37	2017.10.15	Thespakusatsu Gunma	1-2	Tokyo Verdy	Shoda Shoyu Stadium Gunma	2,216
38	2017.10.21	FC Gifu	1-2	Tokyo Verdy	Gifu Nagaragawa Stadium	4,330
39	2017.10.28	Tokyo Verdy	0-0	Avispa Fukuoka	Ajinomoto Stadium	5,410
40	2017.11.05	Tokyo Verdy	1-2	Renofa Yamaguchi FC	Ajinomoto Stadium	6,529
41	2017.11.11	Kyoto Sanga FC	0-1	Tokyo Verdy	Kyoto Nishikyogoku Athletic Stadium	7,365
42	2017.11.19	Tokyo Verdy	2-1	Tokushima Vortis	Ajinomoto Stadium	14,541

== See also ==
- History of Tokyo Verdy
