= 2015 Tokyo Verdy season =

Tokyo Verdy
2015 season
- Manager: Koichi Togashi
- Stadium: Ajinomoto Stadium
- J2 League: 8th

2015 Tokyo Verdy season.

== J2 League ==
=== League table ===
Pos	Team	Pld	W	D	L	GF	GA	GD	Pts
7	Giravanz Kitakyushu	42	18	5	19	59	58	+1	59
8	Tokyo Verdy	42	16	10	16	43	41	+2	58
9	JEF United Chiba	42	15	12	15	50	45	+5	57

Source: Meiji Yasuda J2 League Standing
Rules for classification: 1) Points; 2) Goal difference; 3) Goals scored

=== Match details ===
J2 League match details
Match	Date	Team	Score	Team	Venue	Attendance
1	2015.03.08	Tokyo Verdy	1-1	Cerezo Osaka	Ajinomoto Stadium	12,217
2	2015.03.15	Zweigen Kanazawa	3-0	Tokyo Verdy	Ishikawa Athletics Stadium	6,104
3	2015.03.21	Tokyo Verdy	2-0	Mito HollyHock	Ajinomoto Stadium	3,514
4	2015.03.29	V-Varen Nagasaki	1-1	Tokyo Verdy	Nagasaki Stadium	3,446
5	2015.04.01	Tokyo Verdy	2-0	Giravanz Kitakyushu	Ajinomoto Field Nishigaoka	2,707
6	2015.04.05	Consadole Sapporo	1-1	Tokyo Verdy	Sapporo Dome	9,485
7	2015.04.11	Tokyo Verdy	4-3	FC Gifu	Ajinomoto Stadium	3,178
8	2015.04.19	Júbilo Iwata	2-0	Tokyo Verdy	Yamaha Stadium	8,173
9	2015.04.26	Tokyo Verdy	2-0	Thespakusatsu Gunma	Ajinomoto Stadium	3,056
10	2015.04.29	Tokyo Verdy	0-1	Yokohama FC	Ajinomoto Stadium	5,629
11	2015.05.03	Kamatamare Sanuki	1-0	Tokyo Verdy	Kagawa Marugame Stadium	2,938
12	2015.05.06	Tokyo Verdy	0-0	JEF United Chiba	Komazawa Olympic Park Stadium	7,996
13	2015.05.09	Kyoto Sanga FC	1-1	Tokyo Verdy	Kyoto Nishikyogoku Athletic Stadium	6,146
14	2015.05.17	Tokyo Verdy	0-0	Tokushima Vortis	Ajinomoto Stadium	3,648
15	2015.05.24	Oita Trinita	0-1	Tokyo Verdy	Oita Bank Dome	6,548
16	2015.05.31	Tokyo Verdy	3-2	Tochigi SC	Ajinomoto Stadium	3,594
17	2015.06.06	Fagiano Okayama	0-1	Tokyo Verdy	City Light Stadium	10,019
18	2015.06.14	Ehime FC	2-1	Tokyo Verdy	Ningineer Stadium	2,371
19	2015.06.21	Tokyo Verdy	0-2	Roasso Kumamoto	Komazawa Olympic Park Stadium	2,691
20	2015.06.28	Omiya Ardija	0-2	Tokyo Verdy	NACK5 Stadium Omiya	10,401
21	2015.07.04	Tokyo Verdy	1-1	Avispa Fukuoka	Ajinomoto Stadium	4,276
22	2015.07.08	FC Gifu	0-2	Tokyo Verdy	Gifu Nagaragawa Stadium	3,539
23	2015.07.12	Tokyo Verdy	1-2	Oita Trinita	Ajinomoto Stadium	4,592
24	2015.07.18	Giravanz Kitakyushu	0-1	Tokyo Verdy	Honjo Stadium	3,543
25	2015.07.22	Roasso Kumamoto	0-1	Tokyo Verdy	Umakana-Yokana Stadium	3,956
26	2015.07.26	Tokyo Verdy	1-0	Kyoto Sanga FC	Ajinomoto Stadium	4,908
27	2015.08.01	Tokyo Verdy	2-0	Kamatamare Sanuki	Ajinomoto Stadium	4,807
28	2015.08.08	Yokohama FC	1-6	Tokyo Verdy	NHK Spring Mitsuzawa Football Stadium	5,321
29	2015.08.15	Tokushima Vortis	1-0	Tokyo Verdy	Pocarisweat Stadium	4,564
30	2015.08.23	Tokyo Verdy	0-1	Ehime FC	Ajinomoto Stadium	6,843
31	2015.09.13	Thespakusatsu Gunma	1-3	Tokyo Verdy	Shoda Shoyu Stadium Gunma	3,375
32	2015.09.20	Tokyo Verdy	0-1	V-Varen Nagasaki	Ajinomoto Field Nishigaoka	3,822
33	2015.09.23	Tokyo Verdy	0-1	Omiya Ardija	Ajinomoto Stadium	8,845
34	2015.09.27	Avispa Fukuoka	0-0	Tokyo Verdy	Level5 Stadium	7,588
35	2015.10.04	Tokyo Verdy	0-2	Consadole Sapporo	Ajinomoto Stadium	7,712
36	2015.10.10	Tokyo Verdy	1-1	Fagiano Okayama	Ajinomoto Stadium	3,789
37	2015.10.18	Mito HollyHock	2-0	Tokyo Verdy	K's denki Stadium Mito	5,163
38	2015.10.25	Tochigi SC	0-1	Tokyo Verdy	Tochigi Green Stadium	9,319
39	2015.11.01	Tokyo Verdy	0-3	Júbilo Iwata	Ajinomoto Stadium	16,629
40	2015.11.08	JEF United Chiba	1-0	Tokyo Verdy	Fukuda Denshi Arena	10,693
41	2015.11.14	Tokyo Verdy	1-1	Zweigen Kanazawa	Ajinomoto Stadium	4,298
42	2015.11.23	Cerezo Osaka	2-0	Tokyo Verdy	Kincho Stadium	12,013
