= 2011 Tokyo Verdy season =

Tokyo Verdy
2011 season
- Manager: Ryoichi Kawakatsu
- Stadium: Ajinomoto Stadium
- J2 League: 5 th

2011 Tokyo Verdy season.

== J2 League ==
Match	Date	Team	Score	Team	Venue	Attendance
1	2011.03.06	Roasso Kumamoto	1-0	Tokyo Verdy	Roasso Kumamoto	6,611
8	2011.04.24	Tokyo Verdy	1-2	Ehime FC	Komazawa Olympic Park Stadium	4,516
9	2011.04.30	Sagan Tosu	3-1	Tokyo Verdy	Best Amenity Stadium	5,481
10	2011.05.04	Tokyo Verdy	0-0	FC Tokyo	Ajinomoto Stadium	28,832
11	2011.05.08	FC Gifu	1-3	Tokyo Verdy	Gifu Nagaragawa Stadium	3,083
12	2011.05.14	Tokyo Verdy	4-0	Giravanz Kitakyushu	Ajinomoto Stadium	3,126
13	2011.05.22	Oita Trinita	0-0	Tokyo Verdy	Oita Bank Dome	7,817
14	2011.05.29	Tokyo Verdy	0-0	Gainare Tottori	Tokyo National Stadium	2,322
15	2011.06.04	Yokohama FC	2-1	Tokyo Verdy	NHK Spring Mitsuzawa Football Stadium	4,442
16	2011.06.12	Tokyo Verdy	1-3	Thespa Kusatsu	Ajinomoto Stadium	4,199
17	2011.06.19	Kataller Toyama	1-5	Tokyo Verdy	Kataller Toyama	2,695
18	2011.06.25	Tokyo Verdy	4-0	Fagiano Okayama	Ajinomoto Stadium	2,846
2	2011.06.29	Tokyo Verdy	3-2	Mito HollyHock	Ajinomoto Stadium	2,164
19	2011.07.02	Shonan Bellmare	1-3	Tokyo Verdy	Hiratsuka Stadium	6,336
20	2011.07.09	Tokyo Verdy	3-0	FC Gifu	Ajinomoto Stadium	3,296
21	2011.07.16	Tokushima Vortis	2-2	Tokyo Verdy	Pocarisweat Stadium	5,234
22	2011.07.24	Ehime FC	2-1	Tokyo Verdy	Ningineer Stadium	7,634
23	2011.07.31	Tokyo Verdy	1-2	Oita Trinita	Ajinomoto Stadium	3,273
3	2011.08.06	Tokyo Verdy	1-1	Kyoto Sanga FC	Ajinomoto Stadium	3,007
24	2011.08.14	Fagiano Okayama	0-4	Tokyo Verdy	Kanko Stadium	10,490
25	2011.08.21	Tokyo Verdy	0-2	Sagan Tosu	Ajinomoto Stadium	4,275
26	2011.08.27	Tokyo Verdy	5-2	Roasso Kumamoto	Tokyo National Stadium	4,602
4	2011.09.04	JEF United Chiba	1-1	Tokyo Verdy	Fukuda Denshi Arena	8,826
27	2011.09.11	Thespa Kusatsu	0-0	Tokyo Verdy	Kumagaya Athletic Stadium	3,382
28	2011.09.18	Tokyo Verdy	7-2	Yokohama FC	Tokyo National Stadium	9,958
5	2011.09.21	Consadole Sapporo	4-2	Tokyo Verdy	Sapporo Dome	11,368
29	2011.09.24	Gainare Tottori	0-1	Tokyo Verdy	Tottori Bank Bird Stadium	3,206
30	2011.10.01	Tokyo Verdy	0-0	Tochigi SC	Ajinomoto Stadium	4,311
31	2011.10.16	Mito HollyHock	1-1	Tokyo Verdy	K's denki Stadium Mito	3,947
6	2011.10.19	Tokyo Verdy	1-0	Tokushima Vortis	Tokyo National Stadium	3,305
32	2011.10.22	Tokyo Verdy	1-2	Kataller Toyama	Ajinomoto Stadium	3,455
7	2011.10.26	Tochigi SC	2-4	Tokyo Verdy	Tochigi Green Stadium	3,839
33	2011.10.30	FC Tokyo	1-1	Tokyo Verdy	Ajinomoto Stadium	35,911
34	2011.11.06	Tokyo Verdy	2-1	Consadole Sapporo	Ajinomoto Stadium	5,425
35	2011.11.12	Kyoto Sanga FC	1-0	Tokyo Verdy	Kyoto Nishikyogoku Athletic Stadium	12,287
36	2011.11.20	Tokyo Verdy	1-0	JEF United Chiba	Ajinomoto Stadium	11,641
37	2011.11.27	Giravanz Kitakyushu	1-2	Tokyo Verdy	Honjo Stadium	7,080
38	2011.12.03	Tokyo Verdy	2-2	Shonan Bellmare	Ajinomoto Stadium	3,929
