= 2014 Tokyo Verdy season =

Tokyo Verdy
2014 season
- Manager: Yasutoshi Miura; Koichi Togashi
- Stadium: Ajinomoto Stadium
- J2 League: 20th

2014 Tokyo Verdy season.

== J2 League ==
Match	Date	Team	Score	Team	Venue	Attendance
1	2014.03.02	Tokyo Verdy	1-3	Matsumoto Yamaga FC	Ajinomoto Stadium	12,658
2	2014.03.09	Thespakusatsu Gunma	1-0	Tokyo Verdy	Shoda Shoyu Stadium Gunma	3,855
3	2014.03.16	Tokyo Verdy	1-1	JEF United Chiba	Ajinomoto Stadium	5,136
4	2014.03.22	Ehime FC	2-1	Tokyo Verdy	Ningineer Stadium	2,554
5	2014.03.30	Tokyo Verdy	1-5	V-Varen Nagasaki	Ajinomoto Stadium	2,529
6	2014.04.05	Kataller Toyama	0-3	Tokyo Verdy	Toyama Stadium	2,873
7	2014.04.13	Tokyo Verdy	0-1	Fagiano Okayama	Tokyo National Stadium	5,473
8	2014.04.20	Mito HollyHock	1-1	Tokyo Verdy	K's denki Stadium Mito	3,359
9	2014.04.26	Tokyo Verdy	0-1	Júbilo Iwata	Ajinomoto Stadium	8,170
10	2014.04.29	Consadole Sapporo	0-0	Tokyo Verdy	Sapporo Dome	10,163
11	2014.05.03	Tokyo Verdy	0-1	FC Gifu	Tokyo National Stadium	12,115
12	2014.05.06	Kamatamare Sanuki	0-1	Tokyo Verdy	Kagawa Marugame Stadium	3,388
13	2014.05.11	Tokyo Verdy	1-0	Giravanz Kitakyushu	Ajinomoto Stadium	3,478
14	2014.05.18	Roasso Kumamoto	0-0	Tokyo Verdy	Kumamoto Suizenji Stadium	4,268
15	2014.05.24	Tokyo Verdy	1-1	Oita Trinita	Ajinomoto Stadium	3,250
16	2014.05.31	Shonan Bellmare	1-0	Tokyo Verdy	Shonan BMW Stadium Hiratsuka	12,400
17	2014.06.07	Kyoto Sanga FC	1-0	Tokyo Verdy	Kyoto Nishikyogoku Athletic Stadium	6,942
18	2014.06.14	Tokyo Verdy	0-5	Avispa Fukuoka	Komazawa Olympic Park Stadium	3,406
19	2014.06.21	Tokyo Verdy	1-1	Tochigi SC	Ajinomoto Stadium	3,629
20	2014.06.28	Yokohama FC	0-0	Tokyo Verdy	NHK Spring Mitsuzawa Football Stadium	3,249
21	2014.07.05	Tokyo Verdy	1-2	Montedio Yamagata	Ajinomoto Stadium	4,944
22	2014.07.20	Júbilo Iwata	1-2	Tokyo Verdy	Yamaha Stadium	9,601
23	2014.07.26	Matsumoto Yamaga FC	1-1	Tokyo Verdy	Matsumotodaira Park Stadium	11,600
24	2014.07.30	Tokyo Verdy	1-0	Kyoto Sanga FC	Ajinomoto Field Nishigaoka	3,333
25	2014.08.03	Fagiano Okayama	2-1	Tokyo Verdy	Kanko Stadium	8,123
26	2014.08.10	Oita Trinita	3-2	Tokyo Verdy	Oita Bank Dome	7,563
27	2014.08.17	Tokyo Verdy	1-0	Mito HollyHock	Ajinomoto Field Nishigaoka	4,219
28	2014.08.24	Tokyo Verdy	1-1	Yokohama FC	Ajinomoto Stadium	8,877
29	2014.08.31	FC Gifu	3-0	Tokyo Verdy	Gifu Nagaragawa Stadium	7,178
30	2014.09.06	Tokyo Verdy	0-1	Kamatamare Sanuki	Ajinomoto Stadium	2,434
31	2014.09.14	Tochigi SC	3-2	Tokyo Verdy	Tochigi Green Stadium	5,801
32	2014.09.20	Tokyo Verdy	0-1	Kataller Toyama	Ajinomoto Stadium	3,445
33	2014.09.23	Avispa Fukuoka	0-1	Tokyo Verdy	Level5 Stadium	4,252
34	2014.09.28	JEF United Chiba	0-0	Tokyo Verdy	Fukuda Denshi Arena	12,346
35	2014.10.04	Tokyo Verdy	1-0	Roasso Kumamoto	Komazawa Olympic Park Stadium	2,924
36	2014.10.11	Tokyo Verdy	0-0	Shonan Bellmare	Ajinomoto Stadium	8,467
37	2014.10.19	Giravanz Kitakyushu	2-1	Tokyo Verdy	Honjo Stadium	4,080
38	2014.10.26	Tokyo Verdy	1-1	Ehime FC	Ajinomoto Stadium	3,984
39	2014.11.01	Tokyo Verdy	0-0	Consadole Sapporo	Ajinomoto Stadium	7,764
40	2014.11.09	V-Varen Nagasaki	0-0	Tokyo Verdy	Nagasaki Stadium	6,592
41	2014.11.15	Tokyo Verdy	1-1	Thespakusatsu Gunma	Ajinomoto Stadium	3,788
42	2014.11.23	Montedio Yamagata	1-2	Tokyo Verdy	ND Soft Stadium Yamagata	13,344
