= 2004 Emperor's Cup =

Tournament details
- Country: Japan
- Teams: 80

Final positions
- Champions: Tokyo Verdy (5th title)
- Runners-up: Júbilo Iwata
- Semifinalists: Gamba Osaka; Urawa Red Diamonds

Tournament statistics
- Matches played: 79

The 84th Emperor's Cup Statistics of Emperor's Cup in the 2004 season.

== Overview ==
It was contested by 80 teams, and Tokyo Verdy won the cup for the fifth time.

== Results ==
=== First round ===
- Hiroshima University of Economics 4–0 Sanyo Electric Tokushima
- Gainare Tottori 3–2 TDK
- Mitsubishi Motors Mizushima 3–2 Renaiss Gakuen Kōga
- Alouette Kumamoto 5–2 Mitsubishi Heavy Industries Nagasaki
- Oita Trinita U-18 1–0 Fuji University
- Hachinohe University 3–1 Central Kobe
- Saga University 2–0 Haguro High School
- FC Ryukyu 3–0 Yamaguchi Teachers
- Kochi University 2–1 Hannan University
- Honda Lock 4–1 Teikyo Daisan High School
- Sony Sendai 6–1 Maruoka High School
- Japan Soccer College 1–0 Chukyo High School

=== Second round ===
- Sony Sendai 5–0 Yumoto High School
- Sagawa Printing 2–1 Mitsubishi Motors Mizushima
- Momoyama Gakuin University 2–0 National Institute of Fitness and Sports in Kanoya
- Tochigi SC 1–0 Gainare Tottori
- FC Ryukyu 1–0 Fukuoka University
- Tenri University 3–1 Saga University
- Ehime FC 3–0 Kochi University
- Tokai University 3–2 Otsuka Pharmaceuticals
- Sagawa Express Tokyo SC 2–0 Ryutsu Keizai University
- Honda FC 3–2 Sapporo University
- Gunma Horikoshi 2–1 Luminoso Sayama
- Hachinohe University 8–3 Yokkaichi University
- Thespa Kusatsu 6–0 Mattō FC
- Oita Trinita U-18 2–1 Kihoku Shūkyūdan
- Honda Lock 4–1 Nagano Elsa
- ALO's Hokuriku 2–0 Hiroshima University of Economics
- Japan Soccer College 0–0 (PK 4–2) JEF United Ichihara Amateur
- Chukyo University 2–1 Komazawa University
- Alouette Kumamoto 2–0 Takamatsu Kita High School
- FC Central Chūgoku 1–1 (PK 5–4) Shizuoka FC

=== Third round ===
- Thespa Kusatsu 1–0 Momoyama Gakuin University
- Shonan Bellmare 1–0 Hachinohe University
- Ventforet Kofu 1–0 Sony Sendai FC
- Omiya Ardija 2–1 ALO's Hokuriku
- Gunma Horikoshi 2–1 Tokai University
- Yokohama FC 4–0 Oita Trinita U-18
- Avispa Fukuoka 9–1 Tenri University
- Montedio Yamagata 3–2 FC Ryukyu
- Sagan Tosu 2–0 Tochigi SC
- Consadole Sapporo 2–1 Honda Lock
- Vegalta Sendai 2–0 Sagawa Printing
- Kyoto Purple Sanga 11–2 Japan Soccer College
- Kawasaki Frontale 4–0 Ehime FC
- Mito HollyHock 4–0 Alouette Kumamoto
- Honda FC 8–0 FC Central Chūgoku
- Sagawa Express Tokyo SC 3–2 Chukyo University

=== Fourth round ===
- Yokohama F. Marinos 2–1 Montedio Yamagata
- Gamba Osaka 3–1 Sagan Tosu
- Gunma Horikoshi 1–0 Kashiwa Reysol
- Omiya Ardija 1–0 Shimizu S-Pulse
- Júbilo Iwata 3–2 Sagawa Express Tokyo SC
- FC Tokyo 1–0 Vegalta Sendai
- Kashima Antlers 1–0 Mito HollyHock
- Tokyo Verdy 2–1 Kyoto Purple Sanga
- Shonan Bellmare 3–2 Albirex Niigata
- Avispa Fukuoka 1–3 Urawa Red Diamonds
- Thespa Kusatsu 2–1 Cerezo Osaka
- Consadole Sapporo 2–1 JEF United Ichihara
- Kawasaki Frontale 3–2 Vissel Kobe
- Yokohama FC 1–0 Sanfrecce Hiroshima
- Oita Trinita 2–1 Ventforet Kofu
- Nagoya Grampus Eight 3–0 Honda FC

=== Fifth round ===
- Júbilo Iwata 2–1 Gunma Horikoshi
- Tokyo Verdy 2–1 Nagoya Grampus Eight
- Kashima Antlers 3–2 Kawasaki Frontale
- Consadole Sapporo 1–0 Oita Trinita
- Gamba Osaka 5–0 Yokohama FC
- FC Tokyo 6–3 Omiya Ardija
- Yokohama F. Marinos 1–2 Thespa Kusatsu
- Urawa Red Diamonds 3–0 Shonan Bellmare

=== Quarterfinals ===
- Thespa Kusatsu 0–3 Tokyo Verdy
- Kashima Antlers 0–1 Gamba Osaka
- Urawa Red Diamonds 2–1 FC Tokyo
- Consadole Sapporo 0–1 Júbilo Iwata

=== Semi finals ===
Match No.	Home team	Score	Away team
	Tokyo Verdy	3-1	Gamba Osaka
	Júbilo Iwata	2–1	Urawa Red Diamonds

=== Final ===
- Tokyo Verdy 2–1 Júbilo Iwata

Tokyo Verdy won the championship.
