= 2001 Vissel Kobe season =

Vissel Kobe
2001 season
- Manager: Ryoichi Kawakatsu
- Stadium: Kobe Universiade Memorial Stadium
- J.League 1: 12th
- Emperor's Cup: 4th Round
- J.League Cup: 2nd Round
- Top goalscorer: Kazuyoshi Miura (11)
Home colours	Away colours

2001 Vissel Kobe season

== Competitions ==
Competitions	Position
J.League 1	12th / 16 clubs
Emperor's Cup	4th round
J.League Cup	2nd round

== Domestic results ==
=== J.League 1 ===
10 March 2001 1-1	Yokohama F. Marinos	0-1 (GG) (a.e.t.)	Vissel Kobe	International Stadium Yokohama
JST (UTC+09)

17 March 2001 1-2	Vissel Kobe	2-0	FC Tokyo	Kobe Universiade Memorial Stadium
JST (UTC+09)

31 March 2001 1-3	Vissel Kobe	0-1 (GG) (a.e.t.)	Gamba Osaka	Kobe Universiade Memorial Stadium
JST (UTC+09)

7 April 2001 1-4	Shimizu S-Pulse	1-0	Vissel Kobe	Nihondaira Sports Stadium
JST (UTC+09)

14 April 2001 1-5	Vissel Kobe	0-0 (GG) (a.e.t.)	Consadole Sapporo	Kobe Universiade Memorial Stadium
JST (UTC+09)

29 April 2001 1-6	Kashiwa Reysol	5-1	Vissel Kobe	Hitachi Kashiwa Soccer Stadium
JST (UTC+09)

3 May 2001 1-7	Vissel Kobe	2-1	Avispa Fukuoka	Kobe Universiade Memorial Stadium
JST (UTC+09)

6 May 2001 1-8	Nagoya Grampus Eight	0-2	Vissel Kobe	Mizuho Athletic Stadium
JST (UTC+09)

12 May 2001 1-9	Vissel Kobe	1-2 (GG) (a.e.t.)	Urawa Red Diamonds	Kobe Universiade Memorial Stadium
JST (UTC+09)

19 May 2001 1-10	JEF United Ichihara	4-1	Vissel Kobe	Ichihara Seaside Stadium
JST (UTC+09)

16 June 2001 1-11	Vissel Kobe	1-0	Sanfrecce Hiroshima	Kobe Universiade Memorial Stadium
JST (UTC+09)

23 June 2001 1-12	Tokyo Verdy 1969	1-0 (GG) (a.e.t.)	Vissel Kobe	Tokyo Stadium
JST (UTC+09)

7 July 2001 1-13	Vissel Kobe	3-1	Cerezo Osaka	Kobe Universiade Memorial Stadium
JST (UTC+09)

14 July 2001 1-14	Kashima Antlers	2-0	Vissel Kobe	Kashima Soccer Stadium
JST (UTC+09)

21 July 2001 1-15	Vissel Kobe	2-2 (GG) (a.e.t.)	Júbilo Iwata	Kobe Universiade Memorial Stadium
JST (UTC+09)

11 August 2001 2-1	Urawa Red Diamonds	1-3	Vissel Kobe	Urawa Komaba Stadium
JST (UTC+09)

18 August 2001 2-2	Vissel Kobe	2-1	Nagoya Grampus Eight	Kobe Universiade Memorial Stadium
JST (UTC+09)

25 August 2001 2-3	Júbilo Iwata	2-0	Vissel Kobe	Júbilo Iwata Stadium
JST (UTC+09)

8 September 2001 2-4	Vissel Kobe	2-3 (GG) (a.e.t.)	Kashima Antlers	Kobe Universiade Memorial Stadium
JST (UTC+09)

15 September 2001 2-5	Avispa Fukuoka	0-0 (GG) (a.e.t.)	Vissel Kobe	Hakatanomori Football Stadium
JST (UTC+09)

22 September 2001 2-6	Vissel Kobe	1-1 (GG) (a.e.t.)	Kashiwa Reysol	Kobe Universiade Memorial Stadium
JST (UTC+09)

29 September 2001 2-7	Consadole Sapporo	5-2	Vissel Kobe	Sapporo Atsubetsu Park Stadium
JST (UTC+09)

13 October 2001 2-8	Vissel Kobe	3-6	Shimizu S-Pulse	Kobe Universiade Memorial Stadium
JST (UTC+09)

17 October 2001 2-9	Gamba Osaka	3-2	Vissel Kobe	Osaka Expo '70 Stadium
JST (UTC+09)

20 October 2001 2-10	Vissel Kobe	3-0	JEF United Ichihara	Kobe Universiade Memorial Stadium
JST (UTC+09)

31 October 2001 2-11	Sanfrecce Hiroshima	3-2	Vissel Kobe	Hiroshima Stadium
JST (UTC+09)

3 November 2001 2-12	Vissel Kobe	2-2 (GG) (a.e.t.)	Tokyo Verdy 1969	Kobe Universiade Memorial Stadium
JST (UTC+09)

10 November 2001 2-13	Cerezo Osaka	3-1	Vissel Kobe	Osaka Nagai Stadium
JST (UTC+09)

17 November 2001 2-14	FC Tokyo	1-1 (GG) (a.e.t.)	Vissel Kobe	Tokyo Stadium
JST (UTC+09)

24 November 2001 2-15	Vissel Kobe	1-1 (GG) (a.e.t.)	Yokohama F. Marinos	Kobe Wing Stadium
JST (UTC+09)

=== Emperor's Cup ===
1st Round	bye

2nd Round	bye

9 December 2001 3rd Round	Vissel Kobe	1-0	Montedio Yamagata	Kobe Universiade Memorial Stadium
JST (UTC+09)

16 December 2001 4th Round	Urawa Red Diamonds	4-1	Vissel Kobe	Nishikyogoku Athletic Stadium
JST (UTC+09)

=== J.League Cup ===
4 April 2001 1st Round-1	Sagan Tosu	1-3	Vissel Kobe	Tosu Stadium
JST (UTC+09)

18 April 2001 1st Round-2	Vissel Kobe	4-0 (7-1 agg.)	Sagan Tosu	Kobe Universiade Memorial Stadium
JST (UTC+09)

13 June 2001 2nd Round-1	Vissel Kobe	2-2	Nagoya Grampus Eight	Kobe Universiade Memorial Stadium
JST (UTC+09)

20 June 2001 2nd Round-2	Nagoya Grampus Eight	2-1 (4-3 agg.)	Vissel Kobe	Mizuho Athletic Stadium
JST (UTC+09)

== Player statistics ==
No.	Pos.	Nat.	Player	D.o.B. (Age)	Height / Weight	J.League 1		Emperor's Cup		J.League Cup		Total	
No.	Pos.	Nat.	Player	D.o.B. (Age)	Height / Weight	Apps	Goals	Apps	Goals	Apps	Goals	Apps	Goals
1	GK	(Japan)	Makoto Kakegawa	May 23, 1973 (aged 27)	cm / kg	29	0						
2	DF	(Japan)	Naoto Matsuo	September 10, 1979 (aged 21)	cm / kg	25	2						
3	DF	(Japan)	Takehito Suzuki	June 11, 1971 (aged 29)	cm / kg	21	2						
4	MF	(Brazil)	Santos	December 9, 1960 (aged 40)	cm / kg	26	0						
5	DF	(Brazil)	Sidiclei	May 13, 1972 (aged 28)	cm / kg	28	0						
6	MF	(Japan)	Tomo Sugawara	June 3, 1976 (aged 24)	cm / kg	15	0						
7	MF	(Japan)	Koji Yoshimura	April 13, 1976 (aged 24)	cm / kg	28	1						
8	MF	(Japan)	Takanori Nunobe	September 23, 1973 (aged 27)	cm / kg	15	1						
9	FW	(Japan)	Mitsutoshi Watada	March 26, 1976 (aged 24)	cm / kg	25	6						
10	MF	(Japan)	Shigeyoshi Mochizuki	July 9, 1973 (aged 27)	cm / kg	24	0						
11	FW	(Japan)	Kazuyoshi Miura	February 26, 1967 (aged 34)	cm / kg	29	11						
13	MF	(Japan)	Takehito Shigehara	October 6, 1981 (aged 19)	cm / kg	9	0						
14	MF	(Japan)	Shigeru Morioka	August 12, 1973 (aged 27)	cm / kg	5	0						
15	GK	(Japan)	Fumiya Iwamaru	December 4, 1981 (aged 19)	cm / kg	0	0						
16	GK	(Japan)	Jiro Takeda	September 18, 1972 (aged 28)	cm / kg	1	0						
17	DF	(Japan)	Yukio Tsuchiya	July 31, 1974 (aged 26)	cm / kg	28	4						
18	FW	(Japan)	Mitsunori Yabuta	May 2, 1976 (aged 24)	cm / kg	23	4						
19	DF	(Japan)	Kazuyoshi Mikami	August 29, 1975 (aged 25)	cm / kg	0	0						
19	MF	(Japan)	Takayuki Yamaguchi	August 1, 1973 (aged 27)	cm / kg	7	0						
20	MF	(Brazil)	Daniel	October 10, 1970 (aged 30)	cm / kg	29	7						
21	GK	(Japan)	Kiyomitsu Kobari	June 12, 1977 (aged 23)	cm / kg	1	0						
22	FW	(Japan)	Junichi Kawamura	June 24, 1980 (aged 20)	cm / kg	0	0						
23	MF	(Japan)	Kazuhiro Mori	April 17, 1981 (aged 19)	cm / kg	8	0						
24	DF	(Japan)	Kunie Kitamoto	September 18, 1981 (aged 19)	cm / kg	6	0						
25	MF	(Japan)	Daishi Harunaga	April 30, 1982 (aged 18)	cm / kg	0	0						
26	FW	(Japan)	Kota Wada	September 28, 1982 (aged 18)	cm / kg	0	0						
27	FW	(Japan)	Hiroaki Namba	December 9, 1982 (aged 18)	cm / kg	0	0						
28	FW	(Japan)	Yasuaki Oshima	September 1, 1981 (aged 19)	cm / kg	0	0						
28	MF	(Japan)	Naoya Saeki	December 18, 1977 (aged 23)	cm / kg	10	0						
29	FW	(Japan)	Masayuki Okano	July 25, 1972 (aged 28)	cm / kg	11	3						
