= Masamitsu =

- Gender: Male

Origin
- Origin: Japanese
- Meaning: Different meanings depending on the kanji used

Masamitsu (written: 正光, 正満, 成光, 政光, 将光 or 雅光) is a masculine Japanese given name. Notable people with the name include:

- Masamitsu Hirano (平野 将光; born 1983), Japanese baseball player
- Hoshina Masamitsu (保科 正光; 1561–1631), Japanese daimyō
- Masamitsu Ichiguchi (市口 政光; born 1940), Japanese sport wrestler
- Masamitsu Kanemoto (兼本 正光; born 1962), Japanese footballer
- Masamitsu Kobayashi (小林 成光; born 1978), Japanese footballer
- Masamitsu Naito (内藤 正光; born 1964), Japanese politician
- Masamitsu Oishi (大石 正光; born 1945), Japanese politician
- Masamitsu Ōshima (大島 正満; 1884–1965), Japanese scientist
- Masamitsu Ota (太田 雅光; 1892–1975), Japanese printmaker
- Masamitsu Tsuchida (土田 正光; born 1944), Japanese Go player

== See also ==
- 47293 Masamitsu, a main-belt asteroid
