= 2003 Vissel Kobe season =

Vissel Kobe
2003 season
- Manager: Hiroshi Soejima
- Stadium: Kobe Wing Stadium
- J.League 1: 13th
- Emperor's Cup: Quarterfinals
- J.League Cup: GL-A 4th
- Top goalscorer: Oséas (13)
Home colours	Away colours

2003 Vissel Kobe season

== Competitions ==
Competitions	Position
J.League 1	13th / 16 clubs
Emperor's Cup	Quarterfinals
J.League Cup	GL-A 4th / 4 clubs

== Domestic results ==
=== J.League 1 ===
Match	Date	Venue	Opponents	Score
1-1	2003.3.22	Nagai Stadium	Cerezo Osaka	1-0
1-2	2003.4.6	Kobe Wing Stadium	Kyoto Purple Sanga	0-2
1-3	2003.4.12	Ichihara Seaside Stadium	JEF United Ichihara	3-0
1-4	2003.4.19	Kobe Wing Stadium	Vegalta Sendai	1-2
1-5	2003.4.26	Yamaha Stadium	Júbilo Iwata	0-1
1-6	2003.4.29	Kobe Wing Stadium	FC Tokyo	0-1
1-7	2003.5.5	Hitachi Kashiwa Soccer Stadium	Kashiwa Reysol	1-0
1-8	2003.5.11	Kobe Wing Stadium	Urawa Red Diamonds	3-2
1-9	2003.5.18	Kusanagi (ja:Shizuoka Stadium県草薙総合運動場陸上競技場)	Shimizu S-Pulse	0-3
1-10	2003.5.24	Ajinomoto Stadium	Tokyo Verdy 1969	2-3
1-11	2003.7.5	Kobe Wing Stadium	Gamba Osaka	4-3
1-12	2003.7.12	Kobe Wing Stadium	Nagoya Grampus Eight	0-3
1-13	2003.7.19	Kashima Soccer Stadium	Kashima Antlers	3-3
1-14	2003.7.26	Kobe Wing Stadium	Oita Trinita	0-8
1-15	2003.8.2	International Stadium Yokohama	Yokohama F. Marinos	0-3
2-1	2003.8.17	Kobe Wing Stadium	JEF United Ichihara	0-1
2-2	2003.8.24	Sendai Stadium	Vegalta Sendai	1-1
2-3	2003.8.30	Urawa Komaba Stadium	Urawa Red Diamonds	0-2
2-4	2003.9.6	Kobe Wing Stadium	Shimizu S-Pulse	1-2
2-5	2003.9.13	Kobe Wing Stadium	Tokyo Verdy 1969	0-3
2-6	2003.9.20	Osaka Expo '70 Stadium	Gamba Osaka	2-2
2-7	2003.9.23	Kobe Wing Stadium	Yokohama F. Marinos	1-1
2-8	2003.9.27	Ōita Stadium	Oita Trinita	2-2
2-9	2003.10.4	Kobe Wing Stadium	Júbilo Iwata	1-3
2-10	2003.10.18	Mizuho Athletic Stadium	Nagoya Grampus Eight	2-1
2-11	2003.10.25	Kobe Universiade Memorial Stadium	Kashima Antlers	2-1
2-12	2003.11.9	Ajinomoto Stadium	FC Tokyo	1-4
2-13	2003.11.15	Kobe Wing Stadium	Kashiwa Reysol	2-2
2-14	2003.11.22	Nishikyogoku Athletic Stadium	Kyoto Purple Sanga	2-0
2-15	2003.11.29	Kobe Universiade Memorial Stadium	Cerezo Osaka	0-4

=== Emperor's Cup ===
Match	Date	Venue	Opponents	Score
3rd round	2003..			-
4th round	2003..			-
Quarterfinals	2003..			-

=== J.League Cup ===
Match	Date	Venue	Opponents	Score
GL-A-1	2003..			-
GL-A-2	2003..			-
GL-A-3	2003..			-
GL-A-4	2003..			-
GL-A-5	2003..			-
GL-A-6	2003..			-

== Player statistics ==
No.	Pos.	Player	D.o.B. (Age)	Height / Weight	J.League 1		Emperor's Cup		J.League Cup		Total	
No.	Pos.	Player	D.o.B. (Age)	Height / Weight	Apps	Goals	Apps	Goals	Apps	Goals	Apps	Goals
1	GK	Makoto Kakegawa	May 23, 1973 (aged 29)	cm / kg	29	0						
2	DF	Naoto Matsuo	September 10, 1979 (aged 23)	cm / kg	12	0						
3	DF	Shusuke Tsubouchi	May 5, 1983 (aged 19)	cm / kg	10	0						
4	DF	Kunie Kitamoto	September 18, 1981 (aged 21)	cm / kg	24	1						
5	DF	Sidiclei	May 13, 1972 (aged 30)	cm / kg	30	6						
6	MF	Tomo Sugawara	June 3, 1976 (aged 26)	cm / kg	29	0						
7	MF	Naoya Saeki	December 18, 1977 (aged 25)	cm / kg	2	0						
8	FW	Masayuki Okano	July 25, 1972 (aged 30)	cm / kg	23	0						
9	FW	Oséas	May 14, 1971 (aged 31)	cm / kg	29	13						
10	MF	Harison	January 2, 1980 (aged 23)	cm / kg	15	0						
10	MF	Bismarck	September 17, 1969 (aged 33)	cm / kg	9	0						
11	FW	Kazuyoshi Miura	February 26, 1967 (aged 36)	cm / kg	24	4						
13	FW	Ryūji Bando	August 2, 1979 (aged 23)	cm / kg	27	7						
14	MF	Park Kang-Jo	January 24, 1980 (aged 23)	cm / kg	13	0						
15	MF	Koji Yoshimura	April 13, 1976 (aged 26)	cm / kg	22	0						
16	GK	Fumiya Iwamaru	December 4, 1981 (aged 21)	cm / kg	1	0						
17	DF	Yukio Tsuchiya	July 31, 1974 (aged 28)	cm / kg	22	1						
18	FW	Mitsunori Yabuta	May 2, 1976 (aged 26)	cm / kg	24	2						
19	FW	Mitsutoshi Watada	March 26, 1976 (aged 26)	cm / kg	0	0						
20	MF	Masaya Nishitani	September 16, 1978 (aged 24)	cm / kg	8	0						
21	DF	Yasutoshi Miura	July 15, 1965 (aged 37)	cm / kg	17	0						
22	DF	Ryuji Michiki	August 25, 1973 (aged 29)	cm / kg	0	0						
22	DF	Ryuji Tabuchi	February 16, 1973 (aged 30)	cm / kg	13	0						
23	MF	Kazuhiro Mori	April 17, 1981 (aged 21)	cm / kg	6	0						
24	MF	Takayuki Yamaguchi	August 1, 1973 (aged 29)	cm / kg	15	0						
25	DF	Wataru Nakazato	October 30, 1984 (aged 18)	cm / kg	0	0						
26	MF	Daishi Harunaga	April 30, 1982 (aged 20)	cm / kg	0	0						
27	GK	Kota Ogi	May 5, 1983 (aged 19)	cm / kg	0	0						
28	DF	Yoshiaki Hoya	March 23, 1985 (aged 17)	cm / kg	0	0						
29	GK	Nobuyuki Furo	January 1, 1980 (aged 23)	cm / kg	0	0						
30	FW	Taro Sugahara	June 14, 1981 (aged 21)	cm / kg	2	0						
31	MF	Hiromi Kojima	December 12, 1977 (aged 25)	cm / kg	6	0						

== Other pages ==
- (in Japanese) J. League official site
