= 1997 Vissel Kobe season =

Vissel Kobe
1997 season
- Manager: Stuart Baxter
- Stadium: Kobe Universiade Memorial Stadium
- J.League: 16th
- Emperor's Cup: 4th Round
- J.League Cup: GL-D 4th
- Top goalscorer: Akihiro Nagashima (22)
Home colours	Away colours

1997 Vissel Kobe season

== Competitions ==
Competitions	Position
J.League	16th / 17 clubs
Emperor's Cup	4th round
J.League Cup	GL-D 4th / 4 clubs

== Domestic results ==
=== J.League ===
12 April 1997 1–1	Kashima Antlers	5–2	Vissel Kobe	Kashima Soccer Stadium
JST (UTC+09)

16 April 1997 1–2	Vissel Kobe	2–1 (GG) (a.e.t.)	Nagoya Grampus Eight	Kobe Universiade Memorial Stadium
JST (UTC+09)

19 April 1997 1–3	Yokohama Flügels	3–1	Vissel Kobe	Yokohama Mitsuzawa Stadium
JST (UTC+09)

23 April 1997 1–4	Vissel Kobe	1–2	Júbilo Iwata	Kobe Universiade Memorial Stadium
JST (UTC+09)

26 April 1997 1–5	Kashiwa Reysol	3–1	Vissel Kobe	Hitachi Kashiwa Soccer Stadium
JST (UTC+09)

3 May 1997 1–6	Vissel Kobe	0–2	Urawa Red Diamonds	Kobe Universiade Memorial Stadium
JST (UTC+09)

7 May 1997 1–7	Gamba Osaka	2–3	Vissel Kobe	Osaka Expo '70 Stadium
JST (UTC+09)

10 May 1997 1–8	Vissel Kobe	2–4	Verdy Kawasaki	Kobe Universiade Memorial Stadium
JST (UTC+09)

17 May 1997 1–9	Kyoto Purple Sanga	0–2	Vissel Kobe	Ishikawa Kanazawa Stadium
JST (UTC+09)

24 May 1997 1–10	Vissel Kobe	2–3 (GG) (a.e.t.)	JEF United Ichihara	Kobe Universiade Memorial Stadium
JST (UTC+09)

28 May 1997 1–11	Bellmare Hiratsuka	3–0	Vissel Kobe	Hiratsuka Athletics Stadium
JST (UTC+09)

31 May 1997 1–12	Vissel Kobe	2–1	Yokohama Marinos	Kobe Universiade Memorial Stadium
JST (UTC+09)

5 July 1997 1–13	Shimizu S-Pulse	2–4	Vissel Kobe	Nihondaira Sports Stadium
JST (UTC+09)

9 July 1997 1–14	Vissel Kobe	0–1 (GG) (a.e.t.)	Sanfrecce Hiroshima	Kobe Universiade Memorial Stadium
JST (UTC+09)

12 July 1997 1–15	Avispa Fukuoka	0–1	Vissel Kobe	Hakatanomori Football Stadium
JST (UTC+09)

16 July 1997 1–16	Vissel Kobe	1–2	Cerezo Osaka	Kobe Universiade Memorial Stadium
JST (UTC+09)

1–17	bye

30 July 1997 2–1	Cerezo Osaka	3–1	Vissel Kobe	Osaka Nagai Stadium
JST (UTC+09)

2 August 1997 2–2	Vissel Kobe	0–5	Kashima Antlers	Kobe Universiade Memorial Stadium
JST (UTC+09)

6 August 1997 2–3	Nagoya Grampus Eight	3–0	Vissel Kobe	Mizuho Athletic Stadium
JST (UTC+09)

9 August 1997 2–4	Vissel Kobe	2–3	Yokohama Flügels	Kobe Universiade Memorial Stadium
JST (UTC+09)

16 August 1997 2–5	Júbilo Iwata	2–1	Vissel Kobe	Júbilo Iwata Stadium
JST (UTC+09)

20 August 1997 2–6	Vissel Kobe	2–4	Kashiwa Reysol	Kobe Universiade Memorial Stadium
JST (UTC+09)

23 August 1997 2–7	Urawa Red Diamonds	2–0	Vissel Kobe	Urawa Komaba Stadium
JST (UTC+09)

30 August 1997 2–8	Vissel Kobe	0–4	Gamba Osaka	Kobe Universiade Memorial Stadium
JST (UTC+09)

3 September 1997 2–9	Verdy Kawasaki	2–0	Vissel Kobe	Todoroki Athletics Stadium
JST (UTC+09)

6 September 1997 2–10	Kashima Antlers	5–0	Vissel Kobe	Kashima Soccer Stadium
JST (UTC+09)

10 September 1997 2–11	Vissel Kobe	4–3 (GG) (a.e.t.)	Avispa Fukuoka	Kobe Universiade Memorial Stadium
JST (UTC+09)

13 September 1997 2–12	JEF United Ichihara	3–4 (GG) (a.e.t.)	Vissel Kobe	Technoport Fukui Stadium
JST (UTC+09)

20 September 1997 2–13	Yokohama Marinos	2–1	Vissel Kobe	Yokohama Mitsuzawa Stadium
JST (UTC+09)

24 September 1997 2–14	Vissel Kobe	0–1	Bellmare Hiratsuka	Kobe Universiade Memorial Stadium
JST (UTC+09)

27 September 1997 2–15	Vissel Kobe	0–3	Shimizu S-Pulse	Kobe Universiade Memorial Stadium
JST (UTC+09)

1 October 1997 2–16	Sanfrecce Hiroshima	2–0	Vissel Kobe	Hiroshima Big Arch
JST (UTC+09)

2–17	bye

=== Emperor's Cup ===
1st Round	bye

2nd Round	bye

14 December 1997 3rd Round	Vissel Kobe	2–0	Kawasaki Frontale	Kobe Universiade Memorial Stadium
JST (UTC+09)

20 December 1997 4th Round	Kashiwa Reysol	2–1	Vissel Kobe	Hitachi Kashiwa Soccer Stadium
JST (UTC+09)

=== J.League Cup ===
8 March 1997 GL-D-1	Kashiwa Reysol	5–1	Vissel Kobe	Hitachi Kashiwa Soccer Stadium
JST (UTC+09)

15 March 1997 GL-D-2	Vissel Kobe	1–1	Nagoya Grampus Eight	Kobe Universiade Memorial Stadium
JST (UTC+09)

19 March 1997 GL-D-3	Sanfrecce Hiroshima	1–0	Vissel Kobe	Hiroshima Big Arch
JST (UTC+09)

22 March 1997 GL-D-4	Nagoya Grampus Eight	3–0	Vissel Kobe	Mizuho Athletic Stadium
JST (UTC+09)

26 March 1997 GL-D-5	Vissel Kobe	2–2	Sanfrecce Hiroshima	Kobe Universiade Memorial Stadium
JST (UTC+09)

29 March 1997 GL-D-6	Vissel Kobe	2–1	Kashiwa Reysol	Kobe Universiade Memorial Stadium
JST (UTC+09)

== Player statistics ==
No.	Pos.	Nat.	Player	D.o.B. (Age)	Height / Weight	J.League		Emperor's Cup		J.League Cup		Total	
No.	Pos.	Nat.	Player	D.o.B. (Age)	Height / Weight	Apps	Goals	Apps	Goals	Apps	Goals	Apps	Goals
1	GK	(Japan)	Ryuji Ishizue	July 22, 1964 (aged 32)	184 cm / 75 kg	28	0	2	0	5	0	35	0
2	DF	(Japan)	Ippei Watanabe	September 28, 1969 (aged 27)	184 cm / 82 kg	18	0	0	0	2	0	20	0
3	DF	(South Korea)	Cho Kwi-Jea	January 16, 1969 (aged 28)	177 cm / 75 kg	5	0	0	0	4	0	9	0
4	DF	(Japan)	Hiroki Azuma	July 10, 1966 (aged 30)	179 cm / 78 kg	0	0		0	0	0		0
5	MF	(Denmark)	Laudrup	June 15, 1964 (aged 32)	183 cm / 82 kg	3	0	0	0	6	1	9	1
6	MF	(Japan)	Shigemitsu Egawa	January 31, 1966 (aged 31)	172 cm / 66 kg	14	1	2	0	3	1	19	2
7	DF	(Japan)	Masahiro Wada	January 21, 1965 (aged 32)	177 cm / 69 kg	0	0	2	0	2	0	4	0
8	MF	(Japan)	Masaaki Takada	July 26, 1973 (aged 23)	182 cm / 77 kg	0	0	0	0	1	0	1	0
9	FW	(Tunisia)	Ziad	May 10, 1963 (aged 33)	185 cm / 82 kg	16	4	0	0	5	1	21	5
10	MF	(Switzerland)	Bickel	October 6, 1963 (aged 33)	184 cm / 80 kg	20	3	0	0	6	0	26	3
11	FW	(Japan)	Takuya Jinno	June 1, 1970 (aged 26)	180 cm / 73 kg	29	1	2	0	6	0	37	1
12	DF	(Japan)	Kotaro Nakao	June 8, 1969 (aged 27)	180 cm / 68 kg	9	0	1	0	0	0	10	0
13	FW	(Japan)	Akihiro Nagashima	April 9, 1964 (aged 32)	182 cm / 77 kg	32	22	2	1	5	3	39	26
14	FW	(Japan)	Shinichi Kawano	November 5, 1969 (aged 27)	171 cm / 72 kg	0	0		0	0	0		0
15	DF	(Japan)	Masakazu Koda	September 12, 1969 (aged 27)	173 cm / 65 kg	30	1	0	0	6	0	36	1
16	GK	(Japan)	Masamitsu Kanemoto	October 17, 1962 (aged 34)	176 cm / 74 kg	5	0	0	0	1	0	6	0
17	DF	(Japan)	Yoichi Kajiyama	September 8, 1971 (aged 25)	175 cm / 68 kg	2	0	2	0	0	0	4	0
18	DF	(Japan)	Keiji Kaimoto	November 26, 1972 (aged 24)	181 cm / 75 kg	20	0	2	1	0	0	22	1
19	DF	(Japan)	Naoki Mori	May 5, 1972 (aged 24)	182 cm / 75 kg	6	0	0	0	4	0	10	0
20	FW	(Japan)	Jun Iwashita	April 8, 1973 (aged 23)	173 cm / 70 kg	1	0	1	0	1	0	3	0
21	GK	(Japan)	Takaya Nakamura	June 3, 1978 (aged 18)	180 cm / 69 kg	0	0		0	0	0		0
22	MF	(Japan)	Masaki Tsukano	October 12, 1970 (aged 26)	178 cm / 73 kg	4	1	0	0	1	0	5	1
23	MF	(Japan)	Jun Naito	December 18, 1970 (aged 26)	170 cm / 65 kg	27	0	0	0	3	0	30	0
24	MF	(Japan)	Koji Okamoto	April 9, 1976 (aged 20)	164 cm / 63 kg	6	0	0	0	0	0	6	0
25	MF	(Japan)	Seiji Hada	July 9, 1976 (aged 20)	162 cm / 62 kg	0	0		0	0	0		0
26	DF	(Japan)	Toshihiro Yoshimura	June 28, 1971 (aged 25)	175 cm / 65 kg	27	0	0	0	5	0	32	0
27	FW	(Japan)	Tomoji Eguchi	April 22, 1977 (aged 19)	183 cm / 74 kg	13	4	2	1	2	0	17	5
28	FW	(Japan)	Yuichi Yoda	June 25, 1977 (aged 19)	173 cm / 65 kg	0	0		0	0	0		0
29	MF	(Japan)	Tamio Harakawa	October 22, 1977 (aged 19)	180 cm / 71 kg	0	0		0	0	0		0
30	MF	(Japan)	Koji Yoshimura	April 13, 1976 (aged 20)	176 cm / 70 kg	32	2	1	0	6	0	39	2
31	GK	(England)	Lee	June 17, 1976 (aged 20)	184 cm / 81 kg	0	0		0	0	0		0
32	FW	(Japan)	Yoshihiko Matsuoka	July 29, 1977 (aged 19)	178 cm / 74 kg	2	1	0	0	0	0	2	1
33	MF	(Japan)	Yoshiyuki Hato	August 8, 1977 (aged 19)	172 cm / 61 kg	0	0		0	0	0		0
34	MF	(Japan)	Takuya Suzumura	September 13, 1978 (aged 18)	175 cm / 72 kg	6	0	2	0	0	0	8	0
35	FW	(Japan)	Manabu Shimano	September 5, 1978 (aged 18)	165 cm / 60 kg	0	0		0	0	0		0
36	DF	(Japan)	Ryuji Ishikawa	November 11, 1978 (aged 18)	175 cm / 67 kg	0	0		0	0	0		0
37	FW	(Japan)	Michael Yano	January 22, 1979 (aged 18)	174 cm / 73 kg	10	1	1	0	0	0	11	1
38	DF	(Japan)	Masahiro Nakanishi	May 25, 1978 (aged 18)	171 cm / 66 kg	0	0		0	0	0		0
39	DF	(Japan)	Naoki Naito	May 30, 1968 (aged 28)	180 cm / 79 kg	18	0	2	0	4	0	24	0
40	MF	(Japan)	Noriyoshi Fujiwara †	April 12, 1980 (aged 16)	cm / kg	0	0		0	0	0		0
41	MF	(Australia)	Bingley †	August 16, 1971 (aged 25)	cm / kg	14	1	0	0	0	0	14	1
42	DF	(Serbia and Montenegro)	Vujačić †	January 4, 1966 (aged 31)	cm / kg	14	0	2	0	0	0	16	0

- † player(s) joined the team after the opening of this season.

== Transfers ==
In:

No.	Pos.	Nation	Player
21	GK	(Japan) JPN	Takaya Nakamura (from Kobe Koryo Gakuen High School)
36	DF	(Japan) JPN	Ryuji Ishikawa (from Vissel Kobe youth)
38	DF	(Japan) JPN	Masahiro Nakanishi (from Takigawa Daini Seinior High School)
39	DF	(Japan) JPN	Naoki Naito (from Sanfrecce Hiroshima)
8	MF	(Japan) JPN	Masaaki Takada (from Yokohama Flügels)
30	MF	(Japan) JPN	Koji Yoshimura (from Sanfrecce Hiroshima)
33	MF	(Japan) JPN	Yoshiyuki Hato (from Takigawa Daini Seinior High School)
34	MF	(Japan) JPN	Takuya Suzumura (from Yokkaichi Chuo Technical High School)
35	FW	(Japan) JPN	Manabu Shimano (from Hamamatsu Koto Senior High School)
37	FW	(Japan) JPN	Michael Yano (from Shimizu S-Pulse youth)

Out:

No.	Pos.	Nation	Player
—	FW	(Japan) JPN	Takashi Uemura (to Sagan Tosu)
—	DF	(Japan) JPN	大橋 進一 (retired)
—	FW	(Japan) JPN	Naoyuki Kitabori (retired)
—	DF	(Japan) JPN	Yasuo Sakai (retired)
—	MF	(Japan) JPN	平野 政樹 (to Ventforet Kofu)
—	MF	(Japan) JPN	Michihiro Tsuruta (retired)
—	DF	(Japan) JPN	Hiroshi Matsuda (retired)
—	MF	(Sweden) SWE	Jan Jönsson (retired)

== Transfers during the season ==
=== In ===
- (Japan) Noriyoshi Fujiwara
- (Australia) Matthew Bingley (from Marconi Fairfield on July)
- (Serbia and Montenegro) Budimir Vujačić (from Sporting Lisbon on August)

=== Out ===
- (Denmark) Laudrup (on July)
- (Tunisia) Ziad (on August)
- (Switzerland) Bickel (on September)
- (Japan) Masaki Tsukano (to Tokyo Gas)

== Awards ==
none

== Other pages ==
- (in Japanese) J. League official site
- (in Japanese) Vissel Kobe official site
