= 2011 Vegalta Sendai season =

Vegalta Sendai
2011 season
- Chairman: Shirahata Yoichi
- Manager: Makoto Teguramori
- Stadium: Yurtec Stadium Sendai
- J1 League: 4th
- J.League Cup: Second round
- Emperor's Cup: Fourth round
- Top goalscorer: League: Akamine; All: Akamine
Home colours	Away colours

The 2011 Vegalta Sendai season was Vegalta Sendai's second consecutive season, and fourth overall, in J. League Division 1. It also includes the 2011 J. League Cup, and the 2011 Emperor's Cup.

== J Chronicle Best ==
This is a project to select the J.League "Best Eleven", "Best Goal" and "Best Match" over the past 20 years. A project held in 2013 to commemorate the 20th anniversary of the Japan Professional Soccer League. The mentioned this game is often featured as a legendary game in each media.

Even in "Soccer Digest" (Japan's famous football media), the two were selected as "the best 3 selected J.League matches" by the reporter in charge of Sendai. Sendai's Yoshiaki Ota, who scored the equalizing goal against Kawasaki, said, "I think it was a goal that everyone worked together, including the thoughts of my teammates."

	Game	Date/Stadium	Overview	Highlight	Match data
②	2011 J League Division 1 Round 7 Kawasaki Frontale 1–2 Vegalta Sendai	April 23, 2011 Kawasaki Todoroki Stadium	The first match after the suspension of the league match due to the Great East Japan Earthquake. Sendai, who suffered severe damage to the club itself, came from behind to win. Recorded the club's first victory with Todoroki Stadium.		Official record

== Competitions ==
=== J. League ===
==== League table ====
Pos	Team	Pld	W	D	L	GF	GA	GD	Pts	Qualification or relegation
2	Nagoya Grampus	34	21	8	5	67	36	+31	71	Qualification for 2012 AFC Champions League group stage (Note: League champions also qualified for the 2011 FIFA Club World Cup play-off stage.; The winners of the 2011 Emperor's Cup, FC Tokyo, which played in the 2011 J.League Division 2, also qualified for the group stage of the 2012 AFC Champions League.)
3	Gamba Osaka	34	21	7	6	78	51	+27	70	Qualification for 2012 AFC Champions League group stage
4	Vegalta Sendai	34	14	14	6	39	25	+14	56	
5	Yokohama F. Marinos	34	16	8	10	46	40	+6	56	
6	Kashima Antlers	34	13	11	10	53	40	+13	50	

Updated to match(es) played on December 3, 2011. Source: J.League Division 1
Rules for classification: 1st points; 2nd goal differential; 3rd goals scored; 4th head-to-head results; 5th disciplinary points; 6th draw. If two clubs are tied for first place, both clubs will be declared.

==== Results summary ====
5 March 2011 Round 1	Sanfrecce Hiroshima	0–0	Vegalta Sendai	Hiroshima Big Arch
Saturday 14:00		Report		Attendance: 18,709; Referee: Matsuo

12 March 2011 Round 2	Vegalta Sendai	v	Nagoya Grampus
Saturday 16:00

19 March 2011 Round 3	Kashiwa Reysol	v	Vegalta Sendai
Saturday 15:00

3 April 2011 Round 4	Vegalta Sendai	v	Shimizu S-Pulse
Sunday 16:00

10 April 2011 Round 5	Kashima Antlers	v	Vegalta Sendai
Sunday 16:00

16 April 2011 Round 6	Vegalta Sendai	v	Omiya Ardija
Saturday 19:00

23 April 2011 Round 7	Kawasaki Frontale	v	Vegalta Sendai
Saturday 19:00

29 April 2011 Round 8	Vegalta Sendai	v	Urawa Red Diamonds
Friday 16:00

3 May 2011 Round 9	Vegalta Sendai	v	Avispa Fukuoka
Tuesday

7 May 2011 Round 10	Cerezo Osaka	v	Vegalta Sendai
Saturday 19:00

14 May 2011 Round 11	Vegalta Sendai	v	Jubilo Iwata
Saturday 13:00

22 May 2011 Round 12	Montedio Yamagata	v	Vegalta Sendai
Sunday 13:00

28 May 2011 Round 13	Vegalta Sendai	v	Yokohama F. Marinos
Saturday 17:00

11 June 2011 Round 14	Vissel Kobe	v	Vegalta Sendai
Saturday 17:00

15 June 2011 Round 15	Vegalta Sendai	v	Gamba Osaka
Wednesday 19:00

18 June 2011 Round 16	Albirex Niigata	v	Vegalta Sendai
Saturday 19:00

22 June 2011 Round 17	Vegalta Sendai	v	Ventforet Kofu
Wednesday 19:00

26 June 2011 Round 18	Shimizu S-Pulse	v	Vegalta Sendai
Sunday 18:30

31 July 2011 Round 19	Vegalta Sendai	v	Kashiwa Reysol
Sunday 19:00

7 August 2011 Round 20	Omiya Ardija	v	Vegalta Sendai
Sunday 19:00

13 August 2011 Round 21	Vegalta Sendai	v	Kashima Antlers
Saturday 19:00

20 August 2011 Round 22	Nagoya Grampus	v	Vegalta Sendai
Saturday 19:00

24 August 2011 Round 23	Jubilo Iwata	v	Vegalta Sendai
Wednesday 19:00

27 August 2011 Round 24	Vegalta Sendai	v	Montedio Yamagata
Saturday 19:00

11 September 2011 Round 25	Ventforet Kofu	v	Vegalta Sendai
Sunday

17 September 2011 Round 26	Vegalta Sendai	v	Albirex Niigata
Saturday

24 September 2011 Round 27	Yokohama F. Marinos	v	Vegalta Sendai
Saturday

2 October 2011 Round 28	Vegalta Sendai	v	Cerezo Osaka
Sunday

15 October 2011 Round 29	Avispa Fukuoka	v	Vegalta Sendai
Saturday

22 October 2011 Round 30	Vegalta Sendai	v	Kawasaki Frontale
Saturday

29 October 2011 Round 31	Vegalta Sendai	v	Sanfrecce Hiroshima
Saturday

19 November 2011 Round 32	Urawa Red Diamonds	v	Vegalta Sendai
Saturday

26 November 2011 Round 33	Gamba Osaka	v	Vegalta Sendai
Saturday

3 December 2011 Round 34	Vegalta Sendai	v	Vissel Kobe
Saturday

==== Results by round ====
Round	1	2	3	4	5	6	7	8	9	10	11	12	13	14	15	16	17	18	19	20	21	22	23	24	25	26	27	28	29	30	31	32	33	34
Ground	A	H	A	H	A	H	A	H	H	A	H	A	H	A	H	A	H	A	H	A	H	A	A	H	A	H	A	H	A	H	H	A	A	H
Result	D																																	
Position	11																																	

Updated to match(es) played on 6 March 2011. Source: "World-Football.net".
A = Away; H = Home; W = Win; D = Draw; L = Loss

=== Emperor's Cup ===
2011-10-08 Second round	Vegalta Sendai	2–1 (a.e.t.)	Sony Sendai	Yurtec Stadium Sendai, Sendai
15:00	Ota 74'; Muto 114'	Report	Taniike 79'	Attendance: 5,714; Referee: Tetsuro Yoshida

2011-11-16 Third round	Vegalta Sendai	3–1	Avispa Fukuoka	Yurtec Stadium Sendai, Sendai
19:00	Tamura 18', 22'; Nakashima 82'	Report	Okamoto 68'	Attendance: 4,831; Referee: Tomohiro Inoue

2011-12-17 Fourth round	Cerezo Osaka	1–1 (a.e.t.) (4–2 p)	Vegalta Sendai	Kincho Stadium, Osaka
17:00	Murata 115'	Report	Muto 98'	Attendance: 5,316; Referee: Junpei Iida
	Penalties
	Kiyotake (penalty scored); Kim (penalty scored); Maruhashi (penalty scored); Ogihara (penalty scored)		(penalty scored) Kamata; (penalty missed) Akamine; (penalty missed) Muto; (penalty scored) Matsushita

=== Awards ===
- Individual Fair-Play award
  - (North Korea) Ryang Yong-gi
- Valuable Player Award
  - (Japan) Takuto Hayashi (Japan) Makoto Kakuda (Japan) Jiro Kamata
