= Kazuhiro Mori =

Kazuhiro Mori may refer to:

- Kazuhiro Mori (footballer) (森 一紘, born 1981), Japanese football player
- Kazuhiro Mori (cyclist) (盛 一大, born 1982), Japanese cyclist
