= 2002 Vissel Kobe season =

Vissel Kobe
2002 season
- Manager: Ryoichi Kawakatsu; Hiroshi Matsuda
- Stadium: Kobe Universiade Memorial Stadium
- J. League 1: 14th
- Emperor's Cup: 3rd Round
- J. League Cup: GL-B 4th
- Top goalscorer: Sidiclei (6); Oséas (6)
Home colours	Away colours

2002 Vissel Kobe season

== Competitions ==
Competitions	Position
J. League 1	14th / 16 clubs
Emperor's Cup	3rd Round
J. League Cup	GL-B 4th / 4 clubs

== Domestic results ==
=== J. League 1 ===
Match	Date	Venue	Opponents	Score
1-1	2002.3.3	Nihondaira Sports Stadium	Shimizu S-Pulse	0-1 a.e.t. (sudden death)
1-2	2002.3.9	Kobe Universiade Memorial Stadium	JEF United Ichihara	0-1
1-3	2002.3.17	Osaka Expo '70 Stadium	Gamba Osaka	3-1
1-4	2002.3.31	Sendai Stadium	Vegalta Sendai	1-2 a.e.t. (sudden death)
1-5	2002.4.6	Kobe Universiade Memorial Stadium	Júbilo Iwata	0-1 a.e.t. (sudden death)
1-6	2002.4.13	Tokyo Stadium	Tokyo Verdy 1969	1-1 a.e.t.
1-7	2002.4.20	Hitachi Kashiwa Soccer Stadium	Kashiwa Reysol	0-1 a.e.t. (sudden death)
1-8	2002.7.13	Kobe Universiade Memorial Stadium	Consadole Sapporo	1-0
1-9	2002.7.20	Kobe Universiade Memorial Stadium	Kyoto Purple Sanga	1-2 a.e.t. (sudden death)
1-10	2002.7.24	Mizuho Athletic Stadium	Nagoya Grampus Eight	1-4
1-11	2002.7.27	Kashima Soccer Stadium	Kashima Antlers	0-1
1-12	2002.8.4	Kobe Universiade Memorial Stadium	Urawa Red Diamonds	0-2
1-13	2002.8.7	KKWing Stadium	Yokohama F. Marinos	0-3
1-14	2002.8.10	Kobe Universiade Memorial Stadium	F.C. Tokyo	2-1 a.e.t. (sudden death)
1-15	2002.8.17	Kobe Universiade Memorial Stadium	Sanfrecce Hiroshima	2-1
2-1	2002.8.31	Yamaha Stadium	Júbilo Iwata	0-1
2-2	2002.9.8	Kobe Universiade Memorial Stadium	Tokyo Verdy 1969	0-2
2-3	2002.9.15	Sapporo Dome	Consadole Sapporo	2-1
2-4	2002.9.18	Kobe Universiade Memorial Stadium	Nagoya Grampus Eight	2-0
2-5	2002.9.21	Nishikyogoku Athletic Stadium	Kyoto Purple Sanga	1-2 a.e.t. (sudden death)
2-6	2002.9.28	Naruto Athletic Stadium	Gamba Osaka	3-2 a.e.t. (sudden death)
2-7	2002.10.5	Urawa Komaba Stadium	Urawa Red Diamonds	0-3
2-8	2002.10.12	Kobe Universiade Memorial Stadium	Kashima Antlers	1-0
2-9	2002.10.19	National Olympic Stadium (Tokyo)	F.C. Tokyo	2-3 a.e.t. (sudden death)
2-10	2002.10.23	Kobe Universiade Memorial Stadium	Yokohama F. Marinos	1-2 a.e.t. (sudden death)
2-11	2002.10.26	Tottori Soccer Stadium	Kashiwa Reysol	3-1
2-12	2002.11.9	Hiroshima Big Arch	Sanfrecce Hiroshima	1-1 a.e.t.
2-13	2002.11.16	Kobe Universiade Memorial Stadium	Vegalta Sendai	2-2 a.e.t.
2-14	2002.11.23	Ichihara Seaside Stadium	JEF United Ichihara	0-2
2-15	2002.11.30	Kobe Universiade Memorial Stadium	Shimizu S-Pulse	3-0

=== Emperor's Cup ===
15 December 2002 Third round	Vissel Kobe	1–3	Kawasaki Frontale	Kobe
	Oséas 18'	Report	Alex 10'; Okayama 30'; Ganaha 81'	Stadium: Kobe Universiade Memorial Stadium; Attendance: 3,526

=== J. League Cup ===
Match	Date	Venue	Opponents	Score
GL-B-1	2002..	[[]]	[[]]	-
GL-B-2	2002..	[[]]	[[]]	-
GL-B-3	2002..	[[]]	[[]]	-
GL-B-4	2002..	[[]]	[[]]	-
GL-B-5	2002..	[[]]	[[]]	-
GL-B-6	2002..	[[]]	[[]]	-

== International results ==
26 May 2002 International friendly	Vissel Kobe	0–3	South Africa	Ueno
		Report	Koumantarakis; Fortune; Nomvethe

== Player statistics ==
No.	Pos.	Player	D.o.B. (Age)	Height / Weight	J. League 1		Emperor's Cup		J. League Cup		Total	
No.	Pos.	Player	D.o.B. (Age)	Height / Weight	Apps	Goals	Apps	Goals	Apps	Goals	Apps	Goals
1	GK	Makoto Kakegawa	May 23, 1973 (aged 28)	cm / kg	30	0						
2	DF	Koji Maeda	February 3, 1969 (aged 33)	cm / kg	3	0						
3	DF	Takehito Suzuki	June 11, 1971 (aged 30)	cm / kg	0	0						
3	DF	Naoto Matsuo	September 10, 1979 (aged 22)	cm / kg	0	0						
4	MF	Ataliba	March 2, 1979 (aged 23)	cm / kg	7	1						
5	DF	Sidiclei	May 13, 1972 (aged 29)	cm / kg	27	6						
6	MF	Tomo Sugawara	June 3, 1976 (aged 25)	cm / kg	21	0						
7	MF	Koji Yoshimura	April 13, 1976 (aged 25)	cm / kg	16	0						
8	FW	Masayuki Okano	July 25, 1972 (aged 29)	cm / kg	24	1						
9	FW	Shoji Jo	June 17, 1975 (aged 26)	cm / kg	25	1						
10	MF	Shigeyoshi Mochizuki	July 9, 1973 (aged 28)	cm / kg	25	1						
11	FW	Kazuyoshi Miura	February 26, 1967 (aged 35)	cm / kg	17	3						
13	FW	Ryūji Bando	August 2, 1979 (aged 22)	cm / kg	26	4						
14	MF	Masaya Nishitani	September 16, 1978 (aged 23)	cm / kg	9	1						
15	MF	Naoya Saeki	December 18, 1977 (aged 24)	cm / kg	23	2						
16	GK	Fumiya Iwamaru	December 4, 1981 (aged 20)	cm / kg	0	0						
17	DF	Yukio Tsuchiya	July 31, 1974 (aged 27)	cm / kg	28	1						
18	FW	Mitsunori Yabuta	May 2, 1976 (aged 25)	cm / kg	19	0						
19	MF	Takayuki Yamaguchi	August 1, 1973 (aged 28)	cm / kg	2	0						
20	MF	Daniel	October 10, 1970 (aged 31)	cm / kg	11	1						
20	MF	Harison	January 2, 1980 (aged 22)	cm / kg	11	3						
21	GK	Go Kaburaki	August 26, 1977 (aged 24)	cm / kg	0	0						
21	DF	Yasutoshi Miura	July 15, 1965 (aged 36)	cm / kg	7	0						
22	MF	Takashi Hirano	July 15, 1974 (aged 27)	cm / kg	28	1						
23	MF	Kazuhiro Mori	April 17, 1981 (aged 20)	cm / kg	1	0						
24	DF	Kunie Kitamoto	September 18, 1981 (aged 20)	cm / kg	22	1						
25	DF	Toru Irie	July 8, 1977 (aged 24)	cm / kg	5	0						
26	MF	Daishi Harunaga	April 30, 1982 (aged 19)	cm / kg	0	0						
27	DF	Shusuke Tsubouchi	May 5, 1983 (aged 18)	cm / kg	1	0						
28	MF	Chen Xian Tai	April 29, 1983 (aged 18)	cm / kg	0	0						
29	GK	Kota Ogi	May 5, 1983 (aged 18)	cm / kg	0	0						
30	GK	Nobuyuki Furo	January 1, 1980 (aged 22)	cm / kg	0	0						
31	FW	Oséas	May 14, 1971 (aged 30)	cm / kg	15	6						

== Other pages ==
- (in Japanese) J. League official site
