= Kanemoto =

Kanemoto (written: 金元, 金本 or 兼本) is both a Japanese surname and a masculine Japanese given name. Notable people with the name include:

Surname:

- Akio Kanemoto (born 1945), Japanese golfer
- Erv Kanemoto (born 1943), American motorcycle mechanic
- Hisako Kanemoto (born 1987), Japanese voice actress
- Keita Kanemoto (born 1977), Japanese footballer
- Koji Kanemoto (born 1966), Zainichi Korean Japanese professional wrestler
- Masamitsu Kanemoto (born 1962), Japanese footballer
- Shingo Kanemoto (1932–1991), Japanese voice actor
- Takashi Kanemoto (born 1970), Japanese golfer
- Tomoaki Kanemoto (born 1968), Japanese baseball player
- Yoshinori Kanemoto (born 2000), member of the South Korean boy band Treasure

Given name:

- Nijō Kanemoto (1268–1334), Japanese kugyō
