= 2000 Vissel Kobe season =

Vissel Kobe
2000 season
- Manager: Ryoichi Kawakatsu
- Stadium: Kobe Universiade Memorial Stadium
- J.League 1: 13th
- Emperor's Cup: Semifinals
- J.League Cup: 2nd Round
- Top goalscorer: Mitsutoshi Watada (8)
Home colours	Away colours

2000 Vissel Kobe season

== Competitions ==
Competitions	Position
J.League 1	13th / 16 clubs
Emperor's Cup	Semifinals
J.League Cup	2nd round

== Domestic results ==
=== J.League 1 ===
11 March 2000 1-1	Vissel Kobe	1-0	Sanfrecce Hiroshima	Kobe Universiade Memorial Stadium
JST (UTC+09)

18 March 2000 1-2	Gamba Osaka	1-1 (GG) (a.e.t.)	Vissel Kobe	Osaka Expo '70 Stadium
JST (UTC+09)

25 March 2000 1-3	JEF United Ichihara	1-6	Vissel Kobe	Ichihara Seaside Stadium
JST (UTC+09)

1 April 2000 1-4	Vissel Kobe	0-1	Kawasaki Frontale	Kobe Universiade Memorial Stadium
JST (UTC+09)

5 April 2000 1-5	Yokohama F. Marinos	1-0	Vissel Kobe	Yokohama Mitsuzawa Stadium
JST (UTC+09)

8 April 2000 1-6	Vissel Kobe	1-2	Cerezo Osaka	Kobe Universiade Memorial Stadium
JST (UTC+09)

15 April 2000 1-7	Vissel Kobe	1-2 (GG) (a.e.t.)	Verdy Kawasaki	Kobe Universiade Memorial Stadium
JST (UTC+09)

24 May 2000 1-8	Júbilo Iwata	1-0	Vissel Kobe	Júbilo Iwata Stadium
JST (UTC+09)

29 April 2000 1-9	Vissel Kobe	0-3	Kashima Antlers	Kobe Universiade Memorial Stadium
JST (UTC+09)

3 May 2000 1-10	Nagoya Grampus Eight	1-2	Vissel Kobe	Mizuho Athletic Stadium
JST (UTC+09)

6 May 2000 1-11	Vissel Kobe	2-0	Kashiwa Reysol	Kobe Universiade Memorial Stadium
JST (UTC+09)

13 May 2000 1-12	Kyoto Purple Sanga	3-2	Vissel Kobe	Nishikyogoku Athletic Stadium
JST (UTC+09)

17 May 2000 1-13	Vissel Kobe	2-0	Shimizu S-Pulse	Kobe Universiade Memorial Stadium
JST (UTC+09)

20 May 2000 1-14	FC Tokyo	1-2	Vissel Kobe	Tokyo National Stadium
JST (UTC+09)

27 May 2000 1-15	Vissel Kobe	1-0	Avispa Fukuoka	Kobe Universiade Memorial Stadium
JST (UTC+09)

24 June 2000 2-1	Sanfrecce Hiroshima	1-0	Vissel Kobe	Hiroshima Big Arch
JST (UTC+09)

1 July 2000 2-2	Vissel Kobe	1-3	Gamba Osaka	Kobe Universiade Memorial Stadium
JST (UTC+09)

8 July 2000 2-3	Kashiwa Reysol	3-2 (GG) (a.e.t.)	Vissel Kobe	Hitachi Kashiwa Soccer Stadium
JST (UTC+09)

15 July 2000 2-4	Vissel Kobe	1-3	Nagoya Grampus Eight	Kobe Universiade Memorial Stadium
JST (UTC+09)

22 July 2000 2-5	Kashima Antlers	3-0	Vissel Kobe	Kashima Soccer Stadium
JST (UTC+09)

26 July 2000 2-6	Vissel Kobe	2-3	Júbilo Iwata	Kobe Universiade Memorial Stadium
JST (UTC+09)

29 July 2000 2-7	Verdy Kawasaki	1-2	Vissel Kobe	Todoroki Athletics Stadium
JST (UTC+09)

5 August 2000 2-8	Kawasaki Frontale	2-1	Vissel Kobe	Todoroki Athletics Stadium
JST (UTC+09)

12 August 2000 2-9	Vissel Kobe	2-1	JEF United Ichihara	Kobe Universiade Memorial Stadium
JST (UTC+09)

19 August 2000 2-10	Cerezo Osaka	3-2	Vissel Kobe	Osaka Nagai Stadium
JST (UTC+09)

8 November 2000 2-11	Vissel Kobe	2-4	Yokohama F. Marinos	Kobe Universiade Memorial Stadium
JST (UTC+09)

11 November 2000 2-12	Avispa Fukuoka	3-1	Vissel Kobe	Hakatanomori Football Stadium
JST (UTC+09)

18 November 2000 2-13	Vissel Kobe	1-0	FC Tokyo	Kobe Universiade Memorial Stadium
JST (UTC+09)

23 November 2000 2-14	Shimizu S-Pulse	1-0	Vissel Kobe	Nihondaira Sports Stadium
JST (UTC+09)

26 November 2000 2-15	Vissel Kobe	2-1 (GG) (a.e.t.)	Kyoto Purple Sanga	Kobe Universiade Memorial Stadium
JST (UTC+09)

=== Emperor's Cup ===
1st Round	bye

2nd Round	bye

10 December 2000 3rd Round	Vissel Kobe	2-1	Jatco	Kobe Universiade Memorial Stadium
JST (UTC+09)

17 December 2000 4th Round	Vissel Kobe	1-0	Sanfrecce Hiroshima	Kobe Universiade Memorial Stadium
JST (UTC+09)

23 December 2000 Quarterfinals	Vissel Kobe	2-2 (GG) (a.e.t.) (4-3 p)	Cerezo Osaka	Kumamoto Athletics Stadium
JST (UTC+09)

29 December 2000 Semifinals	Shimizu S-Pulse	1-0	Vissel Kobe	Osaka Nagai Stadium
JST (UTC+09)

=== J.League Cup ===
12 April 2000 1st Round-1	Omiya Ardija	0-4	Vissel Kobe	Omiya Football Stadium
JST (UTC+09)

19 April 2000 1st Round-2	Vissel Kobe	2-0 (6-0 agg.)	Omiya Ardija	Kobe Universiade Memorial Stadium
JST (UTC+09)

5 July 2000 2nd Round-1	Vissel Kobe	2-0	Shimizu S-Pulse	Kobe Universiade Memorial Stadium
JST (UTC+09)

12 July 2000 2nd Round-2	Shimizu S-Pulse	4-0 (4-2 agg.)	Vissel Kobe	Kusanagi Athletic Stadium
JST (UTC+09)

== Player statistics ==
No.	Pos.	Nat.	Player	D.o.B. (Age)	Height / Weight	J.League 1		Emperor's Cup		J.League Cup		Total	
No.	Pos.	Nat.	Player	D.o.B. (Age)	Height / Weight	Apps	Goals	Apps	Goals	Apps	Goals	Apps	Goals
1	GK	(Japan)	Makoto Kakegawa	May 23, 1973 (aged 26)	cm / kg	2	0						
2	DF	(Japan)	Keiji Kaimoto	November 26, 1972 (aged 27)	cm / kg	22	1						
3	DF	(Japan)	Megumu Yoshida	April 13, 1973 (aged 26)	cm / kg	26	0						
4	DF	(Japan)	Yukio Tsuchiya	July 31, 1974 (aged 25)	cm / kg	28	2						
5	DF	(South Korea)	Choi Sung-Yong	December 25, 1975 (aged 24)	cm / kg	25	0						
6	MF	(Japan)	Yuta Abe	July 31, 1974 (aged 25)	cm / kg	11	0						
7	MF	(Japan)	Michiyasu Osada	March 5, 1978 (aged 22)	cm / kg	21	3						
8	MF	(Japan)	Takanori Nunobe	September 23, 1973 (aged 26)	cm / kg	30	6						
9	FW	(Japan)	Hisashi Kurosaki	May 8, 1968 (aged 31)	cm / kg	17	5						
10	MF	(Japan)	Shigetoshi Hasebe	April 23, 1971 (aged 28)	cm / kg	25	0						
11	FW	(Japan)	Mitsutoshi Watada	March 26, 1976 (aged 23)	cm / kg	26	8						
13	FW	(Japan)	Akihiro Nagashima	April 9, 1964 (aged 35)	cm / kg	9	1						
14	MF	(Japan)	Shigeru Morioka	August 12, 1973 (aged 26)	cm / kg	13	2						
15	MF	(Japan)	Koji Yoshimura	April 13, 1976 (aged 23)	cm / kg	24	6						
16	GK	(Japan)	Jiro Takeda	September 18, 1972 (aged 27)	cm / kg	28	0						
17	MF	(South Korea)	Ha Seok-ju	February 20, 1968 (aged 32)	cm / kg	28	2						
18	DF	(Japan)	Takashi Kojima	August 4, 1973 (aged 26)	cm / kg	7	0						
19	MF	(Japan)	Masakazu Senuma	September 7, 1978 (aged 21)	cm / kg	6	1						
20	FW	(Japan)	Mitsunori Yabuta	May 2, 1976 (aged 23)	cm / kg	11	2						
21	GK	(Japan)	Shinya Ando	July 7, 1976 (aged 23)	cm / kg	0	0						
22	FW	(Japan)	Junichi Kawamura	June 24, 1980 (aged 19)	cm / kg	0	0						
23	MF	(Japan)	Tomo Sugawara	June 3, 1976 (aged 23)	cm / kg	22	0						
24	DF	(Japan)	Yohei Taniike	April 5, 1977 (aged 22)	cm / kg	0	0						
25	MF	(Japan)	Takehito Shigehara	October 6, 1981 (aged 18)	cm / kg	6	1						
26	DF	(Japan)	Naoto Matsuo	September 10, 1979 (aged 20)	cm / kg	4	0						
27	DF	(Japan)	Kunie Kitamoto	September 18, 1981 (aged 18)	cm / kg	0	0						
28	MF	(Japan)	Kazuhiro Mori	April 17, 1981 (aged 18)	cm / kg	8	0						
29	FW	(Japan)	Yasuaki Oshima	September 1, 1981 (aged 18)	cm / kg	0	0						
30	GK	(Japan)	Fumiya Iwamaru	December 4, 1981 (aged 18)	cm / kg	0	0						
31	FW	(Japan)	Tatsuya Shimogaki	May 21, 1981 (aged 18)	cm / kg	0	0						
32	MF	(Japan)	Yuta Otsuka	September 3, 1981 (aged 18)	cm / kg	0	0						
33	FW	(Brazil)	Fabinho	June 16, 1974 (aged 25)	cm / kg	3	0						
