= Naoya Saeki =

Japanese footballer

Naoya Saeki 佐伯 直哉
Personal information
- Full name: Naoya Saeki
- Date of birth: December 18, 1977 (age 48)
- Place of birth: Tama, Tokyo, Japan
- Height: 1.73 m (5 ft 8 in)
- Position: Midfielder

Youth career
- 1993–1995: Verdy Kawasaki
- 1996–1999: Kokushikan University

Senior career*
Years	Team	Apps	(Gls)
2000–2001	Júbilo Iwata	1	(0)
2001–2005	Vissel Kobe	77	(2)
2006–2008	Omiya Ardija	38	(0)
2006	→Avispa Fukuoka (loan)	21	(1)
2009	JEF United Chiba	1	(0)
2010–2012	Tokyo Verdy	64	(1)
Total		202	(4)
Medal record
Júbilo Iwata
Runner-up	J1 League	2001
Runner-up	J.League Cup	2001
- * Club domestic league appearances and goals

Naoya Saeki (佐伯 直哉, Saeki Naoya; born December 18, 1977) is a former Japanese football player.

== Club career ==
Saeki was born in Tama on December 18, 1977. Through Verdy Kawasaki (later Tokyo Verdy) youth, after graduating from Kokushikan University, he joined Júbilo Iwata in 2000. However he could hardly play in the match, he moved to Vissel Kobe in 2001. At Vissel, he played many matches as defensive midfielder. However the club was relegated to J2 League end of 2005 season and he moved to Omiya Ardija in 2006. However he could hardly play in the match and he moved to Avispa Fukuoka on loan in June 2006. He returned to Ardija in 2007 and he moved to JEF United Chiba in 2009. In 2010, he moved to J2 League club Tokyo Verdy he played in the youth days. He retired end of 2012 season.

== National team career ==
In August 1993, Saeki was selected Japan U-17 national team for 1993 U-17 World Championship, but he did not play in the match.

== Club statistics ==
Club performance			League		Cup		League Cup		Total	
Season	Club	League	Apps	Goals	Apps	Goals	Apps	Goals	Apps	Goals
Japan			League		Emperor's Cup		J.League Cup		Total	
1998	Kokushikan University	Football League	19	1	2	0	-		21	1
1999	Kokushikan University	Football League	2	0	2	1	-		4	1
2000	Júbilo Iwata	J1 League	0	0	0	0	0	0	0	0
2001	Júbilo Iwata	J1 League	1	0	0	0	0	0	1	0
2001	Vissel Kobe	J1 League	10	0	2	0	0	0	12	0
2002	Vissel Kobe	J1 League	23	2	1	0	1	0	25	2
2003	Vissel Kobe	J1 League	2	0	0	0	2	0	4	0
2004	Vissel Kobe	J1 League	12	0	0	0	0	0	12	0
2005	Vissel Kobe	J1 League	30	0	1	0	4	0	35	0
2006	Omiya Ardija	J1 League	1	0	0	0	2	0	3	0
2006	Avispa Fukuoka	J1 League	21	1	2	0	0	0	23	0
2007	Omiya Ardija	J1 League	17	0	1	0	3	0	21	0
2008	Omiya Ardija	J1 League	20	0	2	0	2	0	24	0
2009	JEF United Chiba	J1 League	1	0	0	0	1	0	2	0
2010	Tokyo Verdy	J2 League	30	1	1	0	-		31	1
2011	Tokyo Verdy	J2 League	32	0	1	0	-		33	0
2012	Tokyo Verdy	J2 League	2	0	1	0	-		3	0
Total			223	5	16	1	15	0	254	6
