= Kobe Sports Park =

- 神戸総合運動公園
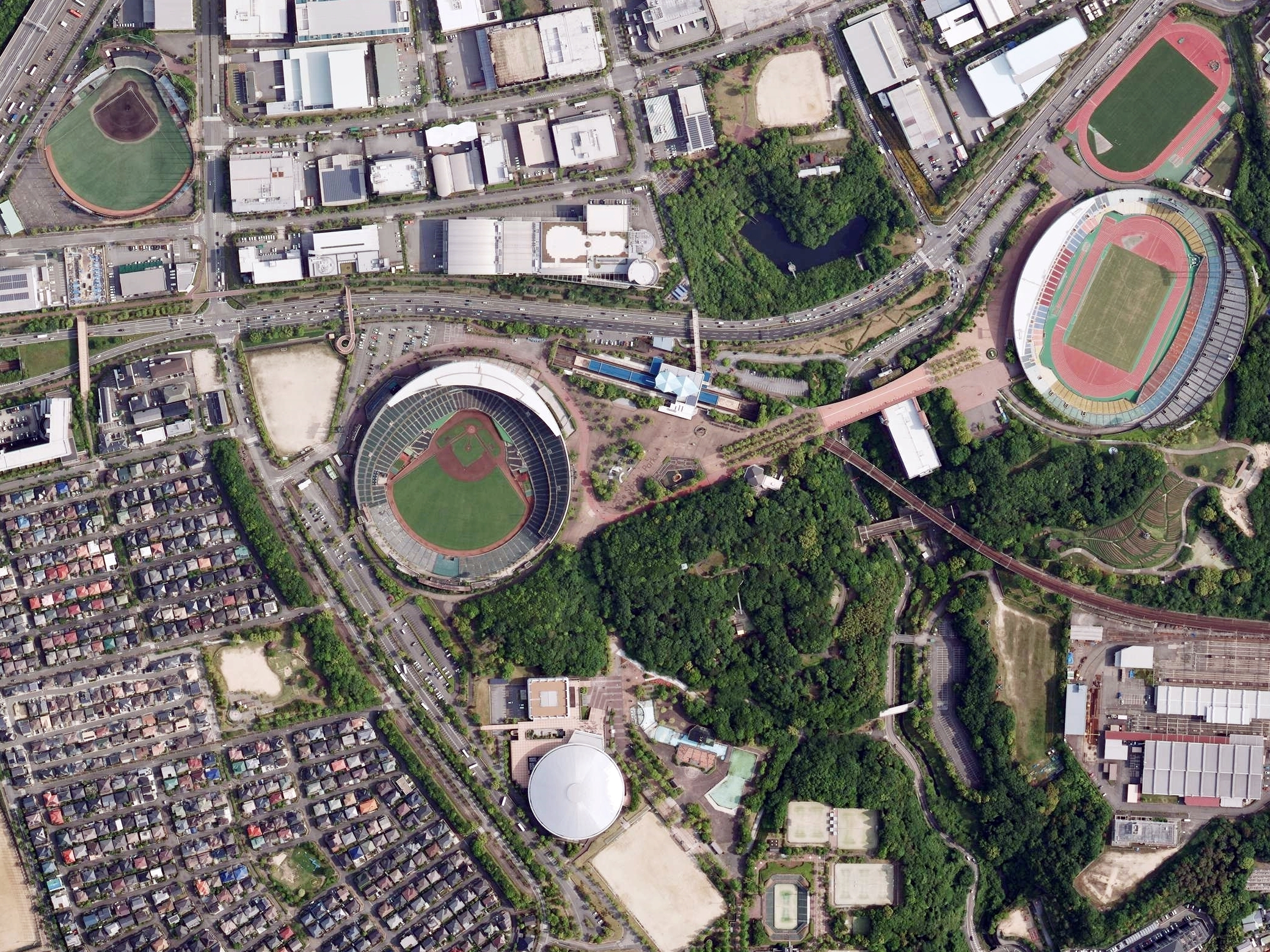
- Aerial photo of the sports complex, 2025.
- Interactive map of Kobe Sports Park
- Full name: Kobe Sports Park
- Former names: Seishin General Sports Park
- Location: Suma Ward, Kobe, Japan
- Coordinates: 34°40′50″N 135°04′40″E
- Type: Sports complex
- Public transit: Kobe Municipal Subway: Seishin-Yamate Line at Sōgō Undō Kōen

Construction
- Opened: 1985
- Expanded: 1988, 1991/92, 2003

Website
- www.kobe-park.or.jp/sougou/

The Kobe Sports Park (神戸総合運動公園, Kōbe Sōgō Undō Kōen) is a sports complex and urban park in Kobe, Japan.

== History ==
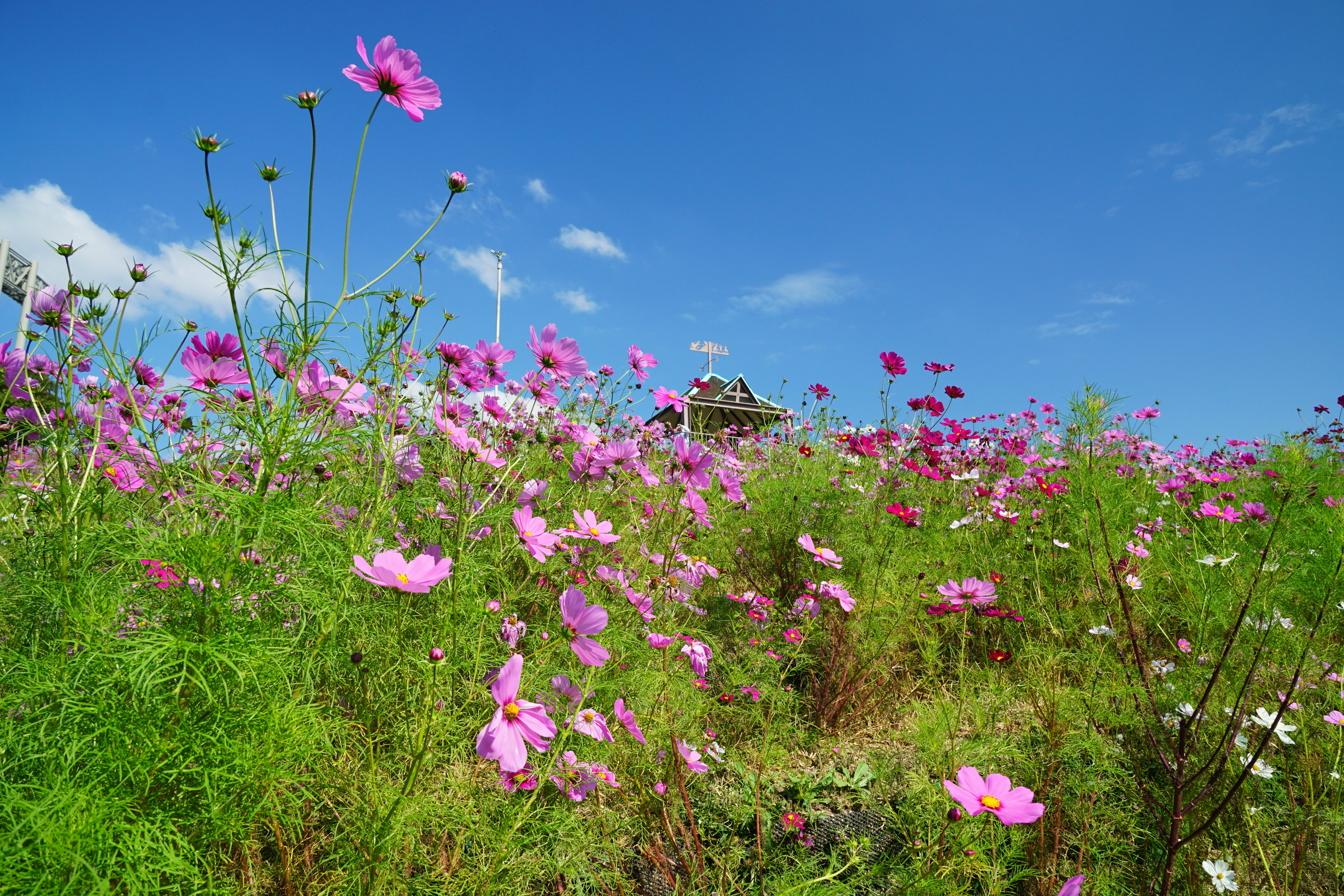
Cosmos Hill

=== Conception ===
The Kobe Sports Park was first conceptualized in 1970 during the development of Seishin New Town by the Seishin New Town Basic Planning Committee. The hilly site between Suma New Town and Seishin was planned as a sports and recreational area that would prevent the two developments from merging while serving their residents. In December 1971, a construction plan for the park was announced alongside the Seishin Distribution and Logistics District, a 114-hectare (280-acre) development planned to its north.

=== Construction and 1985 Universiade ===
Construction of park paths for the development, then known as Seishin General Sports Park, began in 1980. In November 1981, following Kobe's selection to host the 1985 Summer Universiade, construction of the park's first phase began. In 1984, the park was renamed Kobe Sports Park to make its name more recognizable to people in Japan and abroad.

The first facilities to be completed were the Universiade Memorial Stadium and the auxiliary stadium, which opened in October 1984, followed by the tennis courts in November. These were the facilities already open by the time Kobe Sports Park served as the main venue of the 1985 Universiade.

=== Post-Universiade ===
Cosmos Hill known for its cosmos flower field is already a noted feature of the park. The existence of this area is partly the reason why the cosmos was selected in 1986 as the flower of the Suma ward.

The Kobe Sports Park Baseball Stadium opened in March 6, 1988. A second stadium, the Kobe Sports Park Sub Stadium was almost complete by March 1991 and was operational by 1992. It was the first baseball stadium with an artificial turf in Kobe. The Kobe Green Arena opened in June 1993.

== Sports facilities ==
Venue	Image	Purpose	Seating capacity	Opened	Notes	Ref.
Kobe Universiade Memorial Stadium		Stadium	45,000	October 1984		
Kobe Sports Park Auxiliary Stadium		Stadium	500	October 1984		
Kobe Sports Park Baseball Stadium		Baseball stadium	35,000	March 6, 1988	Known as Hotto Motto Field Kobe due to sponsorship reasons	
Kobe Sports Park Sub Stadium		Baseball stadium	1,000	c. 1991/1992		
Kobe Green Arena		Indoor arena	4,852	July 2003		
Kobe Sports Park Sub Arena		Indoor arena	320			
Kobe Sports Park Tennis Courts		Tennis venue	3,000 (center court)	November 1984	Central tennis court with seating, 15 other tennis courts	
