= Harison (footballer) =

Brazilian footballer (born 1980)

Personal information
- Full name: Harison da Silva Nery
- Date of birth: 2 January 1980 (age 46)
- Place of birth: Belém, Brazil
- Height: 1.75 m (5 ft 9 in)
- Position: Attacking midfielder

Team information
- Current team: Grêmio Barueri

Youth career
- 2000: São Paulo

Senior career*
Years	Team	Apps	(Gls)
2001	Santa Cruz	3	(0)
2001–2002	Urawa Reds	17	(3)
2002–2003	Vissel Kobe	26	(3)
2003	Gamba Osaka	11	(0)
2004	Guarani	27	(3)
2005	Ponte Preta	7	(2)
2005–2007	União Leiria	25	(1)
2007	Goiás	12	(0)
2008	União Leiria	11	(1)
2008–2009	Al-Ahli	12	(1)
2009	→ Al Wehda (loan)	5	(1)
2009	Guarani	4	(0)
2010	Sertãozinho	6	(1)
2010	Chengdu Blades	24	(6)
2011	Shenzhen Phoenix	14	(0)
2012	Paysandu	14	(0)
2013–	Grêmio Barueri		
- * Club domestic league appearances and goals

Harison da Silva Nery or simply Harison (born 2 January 1980), is a Brazilian attacking midfielder.

== Biography ==
On 1 March 2010, Harison moved to China and signed a contract with Chengdu Blades

He is the older brother of the fellow retired footballer, Hadson Nery.

== Club statistics ==
Club performance			League		Cup		League Cup		Total	
Season	Club	League	Apps	Goals	Apps	Goals	Apps	Goals	Apps	Goals
Brazil			League		Copa do Brasil		League Cup		Total	
2001	Santa Cruz	Série A	3	0					3	0
Japan			League		Emperor's Cup		J.League Cup		Total	
2001	Urawa Reds	J1 League	6	2	4	2	0	0	10	4
2002	Urawa Reds	J1 League	13	1	0	0	5	2	18	3
2002	Vissel Kobe	J1 League	11	3	0	0	0	0	11	3
2003	Vissel Kobe	J1 League	15	0	0	0	5	3	20	3
2003	Gamba Osaka	J1 League	11	0	2	0	0	0	13	0
Brazil			League		Copa do Brasil		League Cup		Total	
2004	Guarani	Série A	28	3					28	3
2005	Ponte Preta	Série A	7	2					7	2
Portugal			League		Taça de Portugal		Taça da Liga		Total	
2005/06	Leiria	Portuguese Liga	25	1					25	1
2006/07	Leiria	Portuguese Liga	24	0					24	0
Brazil			League		Copa do Brasil		League Cup		Total	
2007	Goiás	Série A	12	0					12	0
Portugal			League		Taça de Portugal		Taça da Liga		Total	
2007/08	Leiria	Portuguese Liga	11	1					11	1
Saudi Arabia			League		Crown Prince Cup		League Cup		Total	
2008/09	Al-Ahli Jeddah	Professional League								
2008/09	Al-Wahda Mecca	Professional League								
Country	Brazil		50	5					50	5
Country	Japan		56	6	6	2	10	5	72	13
Country	Portugal		60	2					60	2
Country	Saudi Arabia		0	0	0	0	0	0	0	0
Total			166	13	6	2	10	5	182	20
