= Mitsutoshi Watada =

Japanese footballer

Mitsutoshi Watada 和多田 充寿
Personal information
- Full name: Mitsutoshi Watada
- Date of birth: 26 March 1976 (age 50)
- Place of birth: Kobe, Hyogo, Japan
- Height: 1.81 m (5 ft 11 1/2 in)
- Position: Forward

Youth career
- 1991–1993: Mikage Technical High School
- 1994–1997: University of Tsukuba

Senior career*
Years	Team	Apps	(Gls)
1998–2005	Vissel Kobe	129	(22)
2002	→ JEF United Ichihara (loan)	12	(2)
2006	Banditonce Kobe	0	(0)
2007	FC Gifu	20	(4)
2008	FC Kariya	11	(3)
Total		172	(31)
- * Club domestic league appearances and goals

Mitsutoshi Watada (和多田 充寿, Watada Mitsutoshi; born 26 March 1976) is a former Japanese football player.

== Playing career ==
Watada was born in Kobe on 26 March 1976. After graduating from University of Tsukuba, he joined his local club Vissel Kobe in 1998. He played many matches as substitute forward from first season and as regular player from 2000. In 2001, he moved to JEF United Ichihara on loan. In 2003, he returned to Vissel Kobe. Although he could not play at all in the match in 2003, he played as substitute and scored many goals in 2004. In 2006, he moved to Regional Leagues club Banditonce Kobe. However he could hardly play in the match. In 2007, he moved to Japan Football League (JFL) club FC Gifu. He played many matches and the club was promoted to J2 League end of 2007 season. In 2008, he moved to JFL club FC Kariya. He retired end of 2008 season.

== Career statistics ==
Appearances and goals by club, season and competition
Club	Season	League			Emperor's Cup		J.League Cup		Total	
Club	Season	Division	Apps	Goals	Apps	Goals	Apps	Goals	Apps	Goals
Vissel Kobe	1998	J1 League	28	2	2	0	4	2	34	4
Vissel Kobe	1999	J1 League	17	0	1	0	2	0	20	0
Vissel Kobe	2000	J1 League	26	8	3	0	4	1	33	9
Vissel Kobe	2001	J1 League	25	6	2	1	4	1	31	8
JEF United Ichihara	2002	J1 League	12	2	0	0	7	1	19	3
Vissel Kobe	2003	J1 League	0	0	0	0	0	0	0	0
Vissel Kobe	2004	J1 League	17	6	1	0	1	0	19	6
Vissel Kobe	2005	J1 League	16	0	1	0	3	0	20	0
Banditonce Kobe	2006	Regional Leagues	0	0	4	4	-		4	4
FC Gifu	2007	Football League	20	4	2	2	-		22	6
FC Kariya	2008	Football League	11	3	-		-		11	3
Career total			172	31	16	7	25	5	213	43
