= Mitsunori Yabuta =

Japanese footballer (born 1976)

Mitsunori Yabuta 藪田 光教
Personal information
- Full name: Mitsunori Yabuta
- Date of birth: May 2, 1976 (age 50)
- Place of birth: Kawasaki, Kanagawa, Japan
- Height: 1.75 m (5 ft 9 in)
- Positions: Midfielder; forward

Team information
- Current team: FC Osaka (manager)

Youth career
- 1992–1994: Verdy Kawasaki

Senior career*
| Years | Team | Apps | (Gls) |
| 1995–1998 | Verdy Kawasaki | 13 | (0) |
| 1999 | Yokohama FC | 23 | (12) |
| 2000–2005 | Vissel Kobe | 117 | (10) |
| 2006 | Avispa Fukuoka | 29 | (5) |
| 2007 | Yokohama FC | 11 | (0) |
| 2008 | FC Gifu | 15 | (0) |
| Total | | 208 | (27) |

International career
| 1995 | Japan U-20 | 2 | (0) |

Managerial career
- 2025–: FC Osaka
Medal record
Verdy Kawasaki
| Runner-up | J1 League | 1995 |
| Runner-up | J.League Cup | 1996 |
| Winner | Emperor's Cup | 1996 |
- * Club domestic league appearances and goals

Mitsunori Yabuta (藪田 光教, Yabuta Mitsunori; born 2 May 1976) is a Japanese football manager and former footballer who is manager of J3 League club FC Osaka.

== Youth career ==
Yabata played for the Verdy Kawasaki youth team from 1992 to 1994.

== Club career ==
Yabuta moved from the Verdy Kawasaki youth team to the senior team in 1995. He debuted in 1997.

He moved to new club Yokohama FC in Japan Football League in 1999, before moving again to Vissel Kobe in 2000. He played many games for Kobe as an offensive midfielder. In 2005, his opportunities to play decreased and the club was relegated to the J2 League.

From 2006, Yabuta played for Avispa Fukuoka (2006), Yokohama FC (2007) and FC Gifu (2008). He retired end of 2008 season.

== National team career ==
In April 1995, Yabuta was selected for the Japan U-20 national team for the 1995 World Youth Championship. He played 2 matches.

== Career statistics ==
Appearances and goals by club, season and competition
| Club | Season | League | | | Emperor's Cup | | J.League Cup | | Total | |
| Club | Season | Division | Apps | Goals | Apps | Goals | Apps | Goals | Apps | Goals |
|---|---|---|---|---|---|---|---|---|---|---|
| Verdy Kawasaki | 1995 | J1 League | 0 | 0 | 0 | 0 | — | | 0 | 0 |
| Verdy Kawasaki | 1996 | J1 League | 0 | 0 | 0 | 0 | 0 | 0 | 0 | 0 |
| Verdy Kawasaki | 1997 | J1 League | 2 | 0 | 0 | 0 | 0 | 0 | 2 | 0 |
| Verdy Kawasaki | 1998 | J1 League | 11 | 0 | 0 | 0 | 3 | 1 | 14 | 1 |
| Yokohama FC | 1999 | Football League | 23 | 12 | 3 | 0 | — | | 26 | 12 |
| Vissel Kobe | 2000 | J1 League | 11 | 2 | 4 | 0 | 1 | 1 | 16 | 3 |
| Vissel Kobe | 2001 | J1 League | 23 | 4 | 0 | 0 | 3 | 1 | 26 | 5 |
| Vissel Kobe | 2002 | J1 League | 19 | 0 | 1 | 0 | 4 | 0 | 24 | 0 |
| Vissel Kobe | 2003 | J1 League | 24 | 2 | 3 | 0 | 5 | 0 | 32 | 2 |
| Vissel Kobe | 2004 | J1 League | 25 | 1 | 1 | 0 | 5 | 0 | 31 | 1 |
| Vissel Kobe | 2005 | J1 League | 15 | 1 | 0 | 0 | 6 | 0 | 21 | 1 |
| Avispa Fukuoka | 2006 | J1 League | 29 | 5 | 2 | 0 | 3 | 0 | 34 | 5 |
| Yokohama FC | 2007 | J1 League | 11 | 0 | 0 | 0 | 6 | 1 | 17 | 1 |
| FC Gifu | 2008 | J2 League | 15 | 0 | 2 | 0 | — | | 17 | 0 |
| Career total | | | 208 | 27 | 16 | 0 | 36 | 4 | 260 | 31 |
