= Yukio Tsuchiya =

Japanese footballer

Yukio Tsuchiya 土屋 征夫
Personal information
- Full name: Yukio Tsuchiya
- Date of birth: July 31, 1974 (age 52)
- Place of birth: Bunkyo, Tokyo, Japan
- Height: 1.77 m (5 ft 9 1/2 in)
- Position: Defender

Senior career*
Years	Team	Apps	(Gls)
1994–1995	Noroeste		
1996	Internacional Bebedouro		
1996	Barretos		
1997–1998	Verdy Kawasaki	18	(0)
1999–2004	Vissel Kobe	154	(9)
2005	Kashiwa Reysol	30	(2)
2006	Omiya Ardija	31	(1)
2007–2012	Tokyo Verdy	208	(14)
2013–2017	Ventforet Kofu	64	(2)
2017	Kyoto Sanga	6	(0)
2018–2020	Tokyo 23	17	(0)
Total		511	(28)
- * Club domestic league appearances and goals

Yukio Tsuchiya (土屋 征夫, Tsuchiya Yukio; born July 31, 1974) is a Japanese footballer who last play for Tokyo 23.

== Playing career ==
Tsuchiya was born in Bunkyo, Tokyo on July 31, 1974. After graduating from high school, he moved to Brazil in 1994 and played for Noroeste, Internacional Bebedouro and Barretos. In 1997, he returned to Japan and joined J1 League club Verdy Kawasaki (later Tokyo Verdy). He debuted in August 1997 and played many matches as side back under manager Ryoichi Kawakatsu in 1998. In 1999, he moved to Vissel Kobe with manager Kawakatsu. He was converted to center back and played as regular player for 6 seasons. In 2005, he moved to Kashiwa Reysol. Although he played as regular player, the club was relegated to J2 League end of 2005 season. In 2006, he moved to Omiya Ardija. He played many matches as left side back. In 2007, he moved to J2 club Tokyo Verdy for the first time in 9 years. Although the club played in J2 League most seasons, he played as regular center back for 6 seasons. In 2013, he moved to J1 club Ventforet Kofu. He played many matches as center back except for 2014 season for injury. However his opportunity to play decreased in 2017. In August 2017, he moved to J2 club Kyoto Sanga and played several matches. In 2018, he moved to Regional Leagues club Tokyo 23.

== Career statistics ==
Appearances and goals by club, season and competition
Club	Season	League			Emperor's Cup		J.League Cup		Total	
Club	Season	Division	Apps	Goals	Apps	Goals	Apps	Goals	Apps	Goals
Verdy Kawasaki	1997	J1 League	4	0	0	0	0	0	4	0
Verdy Kawasaki	1998	J1 League	14	0	3	1	1	0	18	1
Vissel Kobe	1999	J1 League	27	0	0	0	2	1	29	1
Vissel Kobe	2000	J1 League	28	2	4	0	3	0	35	2
Vissel Kobe	2001	J1 League	28	4	2	0	4	1	34	5
Vissel Kobe	2002	J1 League	28	1	1	0	6	0	35	1
Vissel Kobe	2003	J1 League	22	1	3	1	4	0	29	2
Vissel Kobe	2004	J1 League	21	1	1	0	6	0	28	1
Kashiwa Reysol	2005	J1 League	30	2	2	0	2	0	34	2
Omiya Ardija	2006	J1 League	31	1	2	0	4	1	37	2
Tokyo Verdy	2007	J2 League	40	3	0	0	—		40	3
Tokyo Verdy	2008	J1 League	33	1	0	0	3	0	36	1
Tokyo Verdy	2009	J2 League	34	4	1	0	—		35	4
Tokyo Verdy	2010	J2 League	35	2	0	0	—		35	2
Tokyo Verdy	2011	J2 League	35	3	2	1	—		37	4
Tokyo Verdy	2012	J2 League	31	1	1	0	—		32	1
Ventforet Kofu	2013	J1 League	22	2	2	0	1	0	25	2
Ventforet Kofu	2014	J1 League	0	0	0	0	0	0	0	0
Ventforet Kofu	2015	J1 League	22	0	1	0	1	0	24	0
Ventforet Kofu	2016	J1 League	20	0	0	0	1	0	21	0
Ventforet Kofu	2017	J1 League	0	0	1	0	5	1	6	1
Kyoto Sanga FC	2017	J2 League	6	0	0	0	—		6	0
Career total			511	28	26	3	43	4	580	35
