= Masaki Tsukano =

Japanese footballer and manager

Masaki Tsukano 塚野 真樹
Personal information
- Full name: Masaki Tsukano
- Date of birth: October 12, 1970 (age 56)
- Place of birth: Yonago, Tottori, Japan
- Height: 1.78 m (5 ft 10 in)
- Position: Midfielder

Youth career
- 1986–1988: Yonago Higashi High School
- 1989–1992: Waseda University

Senior career*
Years	Team	Apps	(Gls)
1993–1994	Honda	44	(17)
1995–1997	Vissel Kobe	19	(3)
1997	Tokyo Gas	12	(2)
1998–2002	SC Tottori		

Managerial career
- 2003–2004: Gainare Tottori
- * Club domestic league appearances and goals

Masaki Tsukano (塚野 真樹, Tsukano Masaki), born 12 October 1970, is a former Japanese football player, coach, and manager.

== Playing career ==
Tsukano was born in Yonago on 12 October 1970. After graduating from Waseda University, he joined Japan Football League club Honda in 1993. He played as regular player from first season. In 1995, he moved to Vissel Kobe. However he could not play many matches. In 1997, he moved to Tokyo Gas and he played many matches. In 1998, he moved to his local club SC Tottori in Regional Leagues. He played many matches and the club was promoted to Japan Football League in 2001. He retired end of 2002 season.

== Coaching career ==
After retirement, Tsukano started his coaching career at SC Tottori (later Gainare Tottori) in 2003. He managed the club for 2 seasons until 2004. In 2005, he became a general manager. In 2006, he moved to Shonan Bellmare and coached the youth team. In 2007, he returned to Gainare Tottori and became club president, a position he still holds as of 2024.

== President of Gainare Tottori ==
Tsukano has been President of Gainare Tottori for 17 years from 2007-2024, the entirety of the team’s existence under that name. In preparation for becoming president, Tsukano was sent to Shonan Bellmare for two years to gain management experience.

Tsukano’s becoming president of the team coincided with the team’s move to the professional J-League competition, and the name change from SC Tottori to Gainare Tottori. This promotion to the J-League was driven by a local government desire to revitalise the area via sports. However, it depended on finding extra funding.

During his time as President, Tsukano introduced a program to improve the quality of the grass pitch at the club’s Axis Bird Stadium. The pitch is managed by the staff of the club, and over the years Tsukano worked to build pitch expertise among the staff of the club. In recent years the club has developed a grass pitch growing system using unused wasteland to grow turf. This turf is then sold to provide funding for the club. Tsukano formed links with Honda to grow this part of the club’s business.

Tsukano has also worked to partner with other companies to provide the team with more secondary revenue streams. The club worked with a regional bank to introduce a Gainare Tottori branded term deposit, the rate of which was determined by the team’s results. In return, the club received a share of the revenue from the investment product.

== Club statistics ==
Club performance			League		Cup		League Cup		Total	
Season	Club	League	Apps	Goals	Apps	Goals	Apps	Goals	Apps	Goals
Japan			League		Emperor's Cup		J.League Cup		Total	
1993	Honda	Football League	18	10	-		-		18	10
1994	Honda	Football League	26	7	-		-		26	7
1995	Vissel Kobe	Football League	11	1	1	0	-		12	1
1996	Vissel Kobe	Football League	4	1	0	0	-		4	1
1997	Vissel Kobe	J1 League	4	1	0	0	1	0	5	1
1997	Tokyo Gas	Football League	12	2	0	0	-		12	2
1998	SC Tottori	Regional Leagues			0	0	-			
1999	SC Tottori	Regional Leagues			-		-			
2000	SC Tottori	Regional Leagues			1	0	-		1	0
2001	SC Tottori	Football League	24	1	2	0	-		26	1
2002	SC Tottori	Football League	12	0	-		-		12	0
Total			111	23	4	0	1	0	116	23
