= 2004 Vissel Kobe season =

Vissel Kobe
2004 season
- Manager: Ivan Hašek; Hiroshi Kato
- Stadium: Kobe Wing Stadium
- J. League 1: 11th
- Emperor's Cup: 4th Round
- J. League Cup: Group Stage
- Top goalscorer: Ryuji Bando (17)
Home colours	Away colours

During the 2004 season, Vissel Kobe competed in the J. League 1, in which they finished 11th.

== Competitions ==
Competitions	Position
J. League 1	11th / 16 clubs
Emperor's Cup	4th Round
J. League Cup	Group Stage

== Domestic results ==
=== J. League 1 ===
Match	Date	Venue	Opponents	Score
1-1	2004..			-
1-2	2004..			-
1-3	2004..			-
1-4	2004..			-
1-5	2004..			-
1-6	2004..			-
1-7	2004..			-
1-8	2004..			-
1-9	2004..			-
1-10	2004..			-
1-11	2004..			-
1-12	2004..			-
1-13	2004..			-
1-14	2004..			-
1-15	2004..			-
2-1	2004..			-
2-2	2004..			-
2-3	2004..			-
2-4	2004..			-
2-5	2004..			-
2-6	2004..			-
2-7	2004..			-
2-8	2004..			-
2-9	2004..			-
2-10	2004..			-
2-11	2004..			-
2-12	2004..			-
2-13	2004..			-
2-14	2004..			-
2-15	2004..			-

=== Emperor's Cup ===
Match	Date	Venue	Opponents	Score
4th Round	2004.11.13	Todoroki Stadium	Kawasaki Frontale	2-3

=== J. League Cup ===
Match	Date	Venue	Opponents	Score
1	2004.03.27	NOEVIR Stadium Kobe	Kashiwa Reysol	1-0
2	2004.04.29	SANKYO FRONTIER Kashiwa Stadium	Kashiwa Reysol	1-1
3	2004.05.29	NOEVIR Stadium Kobe	Kashima Antlers	0-3
4	2004.06.05	National Stadium	FC Tokyo	1-2
5	2004.07.17	NOEVIR Stadium Kobe	FC Tokyo	1-2
6	2004.07.24	Kashima Soccer Stadium	Kashima Antlers	0-2

== Player statistics ==
No.	Pos.	Player	D.o.B. (Age)	Height / Weight	J. League 1		Emperor's Cup		J. League Cup		Total	
No.	Pos.	Player	D.o.B. (Age)	Height / Weight	Apps	Goals	Apps	Goals	Apps	Goals	Apps	Goals
1	GK	Makoto Kakegawa	May 23, 1973 (aged 30)	cm / kg	17	0						
2	DF	Naoto Matsuo	September 10, 1979 (aged 24)	cm / kg	2	0						
2	DF	Kazumichi Takagi	November 21, 1980 (aged 23)	cm / kg	13	0						
3	DF	Shusuke Tsubouchi	May 5, 1983 (aged 20)	cm / kg	21	0						
4	DF	Kunie Kitamoto	September 18, 1981 (aged 22)	cm / kg	27	2						
5	MF	Tomo Sugawara	June 3, 1976 (aged 27)	cm / kg	12	0						
6	DF	Roger	April 25, 1975 (aged 28)	cm / kg	28	3						
7	MF	Park Kang-Jo	January 24, 1980 (aged 24)	cm / kg	26	0						
8	MF	Naoya Saeki	December 18, 1977 (aged 26)	cm / kg	12	0						
9	FW	Leandrão	July 18, 1983 (aged 20)	cm / kg	11	2						
9	FW	Patrick M'Boma	November 15, 1970 (aged 33)	cm / kg	6	2						
10	MF	Chikara Fujimoto	October 31, 1977 (aged 26)	cm / kg	20	1						
11	FW	Kazuyoshi Miura	February 26, 1967 (aged 37)	cm / kg	21	4						
13	FW	Ryūji Bando	August 2, 1979 (aged 24)	cm / kg	28	17						
14	MF	Tomohiro Wanami	April 27, 1980 (aged 23)	cm / kg	0	0						
14	MF	Horvy	April 22, 1975 (aged 28)	cm / kg	14	6						
15	MF	Koji Yoshimura	April 13, 1976 (aged 27)	cm / kg	7	0						
15	MF	Kunihiko Takizawa	April 20, 1978 (aged 25)	cm / kg	2	0						
16	GK	Fumiya Iwamaru	December 4, 1981 (aged 22)	cm / kg	6	0						
16	GK	Hiromasa Yamamoto	June 5, 1979 (aged 24)	cm / kg	1	0						
17	DF	Yukio Tsuchiya	July 31, 1974 (aged 29)	cm / kg	21	1						
18	FW	Mitsunori Yabuta	May 2, 1976 (aged 27)	cm / kg	25	1						
19	FW	Mitsutoshi Watada	March 26, 1976 (aged 27)	cm / kg	17	6						
20	MF	Hiromi Kojima	December 12, 1977 (aged 26)	cm / kg	21	2						
21	DF	Daisuke Aono	September 19, 1979 (aged 24)	cm / kg	0	0						
22	FW	Hiroki Kishida	June 7, 1981 (aged 22)	cm / kg	0	0						
23	MF	Kazuhiro Mori	April 17, 1981 (aged 22)	cm / kg	4	0						
24	DF	Hiroyuki Nishijima	April 7, 1982 (aged 21)	cm / kg	0	0						
25	DF	Wataru Nakazato	October 30, 1984 (aged 19)	cm / kg	0	0						
26	DF	Noriaki Ishizawa	May 25, 1985 (aged 18)	cm / kg	0	0						
27	GK	Kota Ogi	May 5, 1983 (aged 20)	cm / kg	0	0						
28	DF	Hiroyuki Komoto	September 4, 1985 (aged 18)	cm / kg	8	2						
29	GK	Nobuyuki Furo	January 1, 1980 (aged 24)	cm / kg	0	0						
30	FW	Kazutaka Murase	September 11, 1985 (aged 18)	cm / kg	4	0						
31	MF	Masafumi Yoshida	September 6, 1985 (aged 18)	cm / kg	0	0						
32	FW	İlhan Mansız	August 10, 1975 (aged 28)	cm / kg	3	0						
32	FW	Tomoyuki Hirase	May 23, 1977 (aged 26)	cm / kg	10	1						
33	DF	Ryuhei Niwa	January 13, 1986 (aged 18)	cm / kg	8	0						
34	GK	Seiji Honda	February 25, 1976 (aged 28)	cm / kg	6	0						

== Other pages ==
- (in Japanese) J. League official site
