= Sidiclei =

Brazilian footballer

Personal information
- Full name: Sidiclei de Souza
- Date of birth: 13 May 1972 (age 54)
- Place of birth: Cascavel, Brazil
- Height: 1.87 m (6 ft 2 in)
- Position: Defender

Youth career
- 1987–1990: Cascavel

Senior career*
Years	Team	Apps	(Gls)
1990–1997	Matsubara		
1996	→ Atlético Paranaense (loan)		
1997–1998	Montedio Yamagata	49	(9)
1999	Kyoto Purple Sanga	29	(4)
2000	Oita Trinita	35	(5)
2001–2003	Vissel Kobe	85	(12)
2004–2007	Gamba Osaka	122	(9)
2008–2009	Kyoto Sanga FC	53	(1)
2010–2011	Cascavel		
2010	→ Marcílio Dias (loan)		
2011	Águia Negra		
- * Club domestic league appearances and goals as of 25 September 2010

Sidiclei de Souza (born 13 May 1972 in Cascavel, Brazil), simply known as Sidiclei, is a Brazilian football player.

Sidiclei previously played for Atletico Paranaense in the Copa do Brasil.

Sidiclei captained for Gamba Osaka in 2005 and Kyoto Sanga FC in 2009. He is considered one of the most successful foreign players in Japan, and was seen as a cult figure amongst the supporters.

He is also famous in 2channel by the phrase "Too bad, Sidiclei is there", an allegory of his great skill of defending, especially anticipation.

== Club statistics ==
Club performance			League		Cup		League Cup		Continental		Total	
Season	Club	League	Apps	Goals	Apps	Goals	Apps	Goals	Apps	Goals	Apps	Goals
Japan			League		Emperor's Cup		J.League Cup		Asia		Total	
1997	Montedio Yamagata	Football League	22	5	3	1	-		-		25	6
1998	Montedio Yamagata	Football League	27	4	4	2	-		-		31	6
1999	Kyoto Purple Sanga	J1 League	29	4	1	0	4	0	-		34	4
2000	Oita Trinita	J2 League	35	5	3	1	2	1	-		40	7
2001	Vissel Kobe	J1 League	28	0	2	0	3	1	-		33	1
2002	Vissel Kobe	J1 League	27	6	1	0	6	2	-		34	8
2003	Vissel Kobe	J1 League	30	6	3	1	6	1	-		39	8
2004	Gamba Osaka	J1 League	30	3	3	0	5	1	-		38	4
2005	Gamba Osaka	J1 League	28	1	3	1	11	3	-		42	5
2006	Gamba Osaka	J1 League	31	3	1	0	2	0	6	0	40	3
2007	Gamba Osaka	J1 League	33	2	3	0	11	2	-		47	4
2008	Kyoto Sanga FC	J1 League	33	1	2	0	5	0	-		40	1
2009	Kyoto Sanga FC	J1 League	20	0	2	0	5	0	-		27	0
Total			373	40	31	6	61	11	6	0	476	57
