= Masaya Nishitani =

Japanese footballer

Masaya Nishitani 西谷 正也
Personal information
- Full name: Masaya Nishitani
- Date of birth: September 16, 1978 (age 48)
- Place of birth: Tokushima, Tokushima, Japan
- Height: 1.70 m (5 ft 7 in)
- Position: Midfielder

Youth career
- 1994–1996: Hokuyo High School

Senior career*
Years	Team	Apps	(Gls)
1997–2001	Cerezo Osaka	99	(22)
2002–2003	Vissel Kobe	17	(1)
2004	Vegalta Sendai	9	(0)
2005	Urawa Reds	2	(0)
2005–2008	Consadole Sapporo	108	(16)
Total		235	(39)
Medal record
Cerezo Osaka
Runner-up	Emperor's Cup	2001
Urawa Reds
Runner-up	J1 League	2005
Winner	Emperor's Cup	2005
- * Club domestic league appearances and goals

Masaya Nishitani (西谷 正也, Nishitani Masaya; born September 16, 1978) is a former Japanese football player.

== Club career ==
Nishitani was born in Tokushima on September 16, 1978. After graduating from high school, he joined Cerezo Osaka in 1997. He was originally forward, he played as left midfielder in professional career. He played many matches from 1998. However his opportunity to play decreased in 2001 and the club was relegated to J2 League end of 2001 season. From 2002, he played some clubs, Vissel Kobe (2002-03), Vegalta Sendai (2004) and Urawa Reds (2005). However he could hardly play in the match in both clubs. In September 2005, he moved to J2 League club Consadole Sapporo. He played many matches and the club won the champions in 2007 and was promoted to J1 League. He retired end of 2008 season.

== National team career ==
In August 1995, Nishitani was selected Japan U-17 national team for 1995 U-17 World Championship, but he did not play in the match.

== Club statistics ==
Club performance			League		Cup		League Cup		Total	
Season	Club	League	Apps	Goals	Apps	Goals	Apps	Goals	Apps	Goals
Japan			League		Emperor's Cup		J.League Cup		Total	
1997	Cerezo Osaka	J1 League	3	0	1	0	0	0	4	0
1998	Cerezo Osaka	J1 League	19	4	0	0	4	0	23	4
1999	Cerezo Osaka	J1 League	30	8	2	1	3	0	35	9
2000	Cerezo Osaka	J1 League	27	5	3	0	3	0	33	5
2001	Cerezo Osaka	J1 League	20	5	0	0	2	0	22	5
2002	Vissel Kobe	J1 League	9	1	0	0	6	0	15	1
2003	Vissel Kobe	J1 League	8	0	0	0	2	0	10	0
2004	Vegalta Sendai	J2 League	9	0	0	0	-		9	0
2005	Urawa Reds	J1 League	2	0	0	0	3	0	5	0
2005	Consadole Sapporo	J2 League	10	1	1	0	-		11	1
2006	Consadole Sapporo	J2 League	39	5	3	0	-		42	5
2007	Consadole Sapporo	J2 League	38	10	0	0	-		38	10
2008	Consadole Sapporo	J1 League	21	0	1	0	4	0	26	0
Total			235	39	11	1	27	0	273	40
