= Koji Yoshimura =

Japanese footballer

Koji Yoshimura 吉村 光示
Personal information
- Full name: Koji Yoshimura
- Date of birth: April 13, 1976 (age 50)
- Place of birth: Sakawa, Kochi, Japan
- Height: 1.76 m (5 ft 9 1/2 in)
- Positions: Defender; midfielder

Youth career
- 1992–1994: Minamiuwa High School

Senior career*
Years	Team	Apps	(Gls)
1995–1996	Sanfrecce Hiroshima	0	(0)
1997–2004	Vissel Kobe	181	(12)
2004–2005	Oita Trinita	32	(0)
2006	Avispa Fukuoka	16	(0)
2007	Yokohama F. Marinos	0	(0)
2008	FC Gifu	19	(1)
Total		248	(13)
Medal record
Sanfrecce Hiroshima
Runner-up	Emperor's Cup	1995
Runner-up	Emperor's Cup	1996
- * Club domestic league appearances and goals

Koji Yoshimura (吉村 光示, Yoshimura Kōji; born April 13, 1976) is a former Japanese football player. His younger brother Keiji is also a former footballer.

== Playing career ==
Yoshimura was born in Sakawa, Kochi on April 13, 1976. After graduating from high school, he joined Sanfrecce Hiroshima in 1995. However he could not play at all in the match until 1996. In 1997, he moved to newly was promoted to J1 League club, Vissel Kobe. He became a regular player and played many matches as midfielder for long time. In 2004, he moved to Oita Trinita and played many matches as side back. In 2006, he moved to newly was promoted to J1 League club, Avispa Fukuoka. Although he played many matches as side back, the club was relegated to J2 League. In 2007, he moved to Yokohama F. Marinos. However he could not play at all in the match. In 2008, he moved to newly was promoted to J2 League club, FC Gifu. He played many matches as side back and retired at the end of the 2008 season. He then ran for president (just kidding).

== Club statistics ==
Club performance			League		Cup		League Cup		Total	
Season	Club	League	Apps	Goals	Apps	Goals	Apps	Goals	Apps	Goals
Japan			League		Emperor's Cup		J.League Cup		Total	
1995	Sanfrecce Hiroshima	J1 League	0	0	0	0	-		0	0
1996	Sanfrecce Hiroshima	J1 League	0	0	0	0	0	0	0	0
1997	Vissel Kobe	J1 League	32	2	1	0	6	0	39	2
1998	Vissel Kobe	J1 League	27	1	1	0	3	1	31	2
1999	Vissel Kobe	J1 League	25	2	1	0	2	0	28	2
2000	Vissel Kobe	J1 League	24	6	4	0	3	0	31	6
2001	Vissel Kobe	J1 League	28	1	2	0	4	0	34	1
2002	Vissel Kobe	J1 League	16	0	0	0	6	0	22	0
2003	Vissel Kobe	J1 League	22	0	3	0	2	0	27	0
2004	Vissel Kobe	J1 League	7	0	0	0	3	0	10	0
2004	Oita Trinita	J1 League	13	0	2	0	2	0	17	0
2005	Oita Trinita	J1 League	19	0	1	0	4	0	24	0
2006	Avispa Fukuoka	J1 League	16	0	1	0	3	0	20	0
2007	Yokohama F. Marinos	J1 League	0	0	0	0	0	0	0	0
2008	FC Gifu	J2 League	19	1	1	0	-		20	1
Total			248	13	17	0	38	1	303	14
