= Hotto Motto Field Kobe =

Baseball stadium in Kobe, Japan

- ほっともっとフィールド神戸
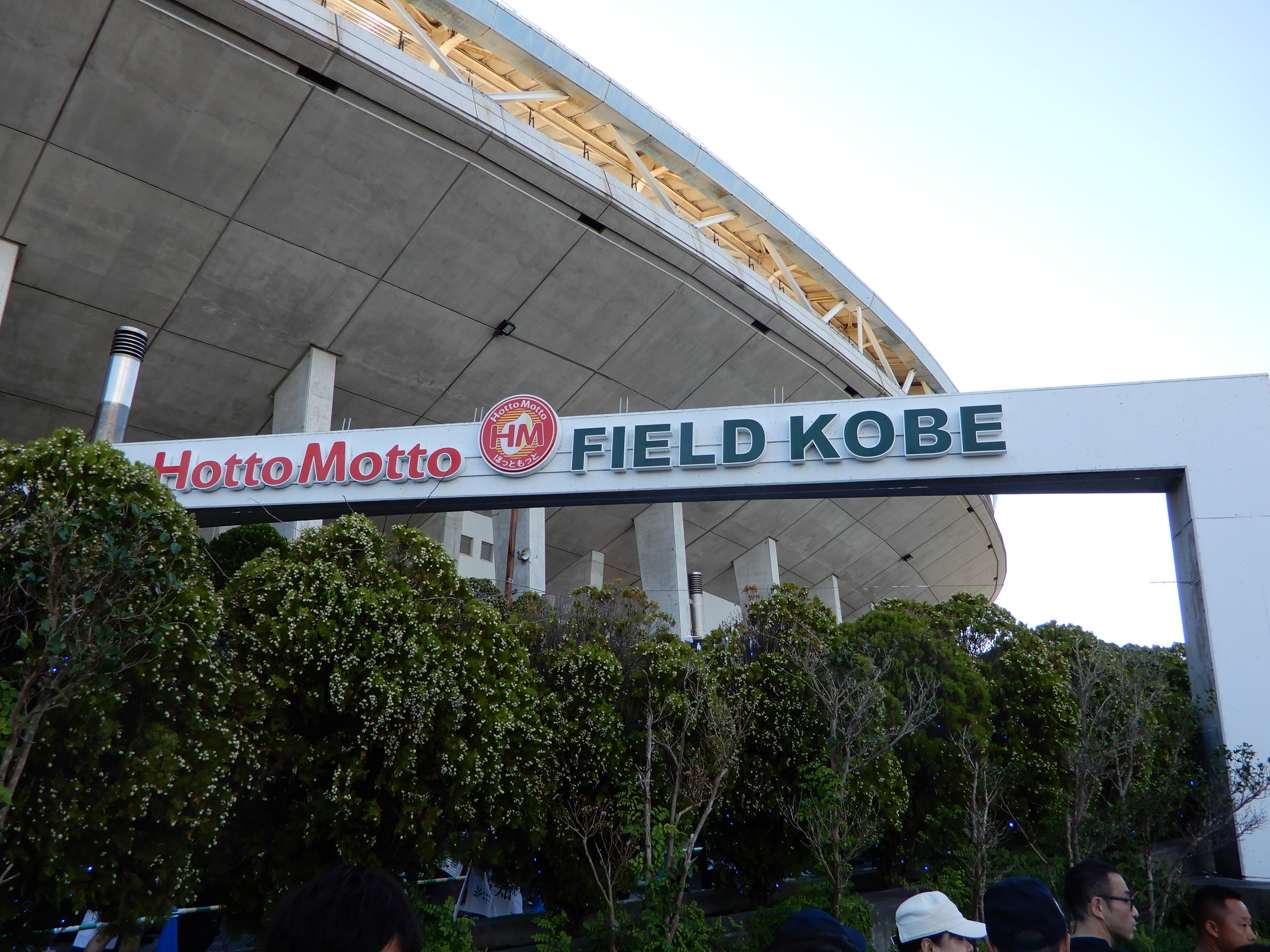

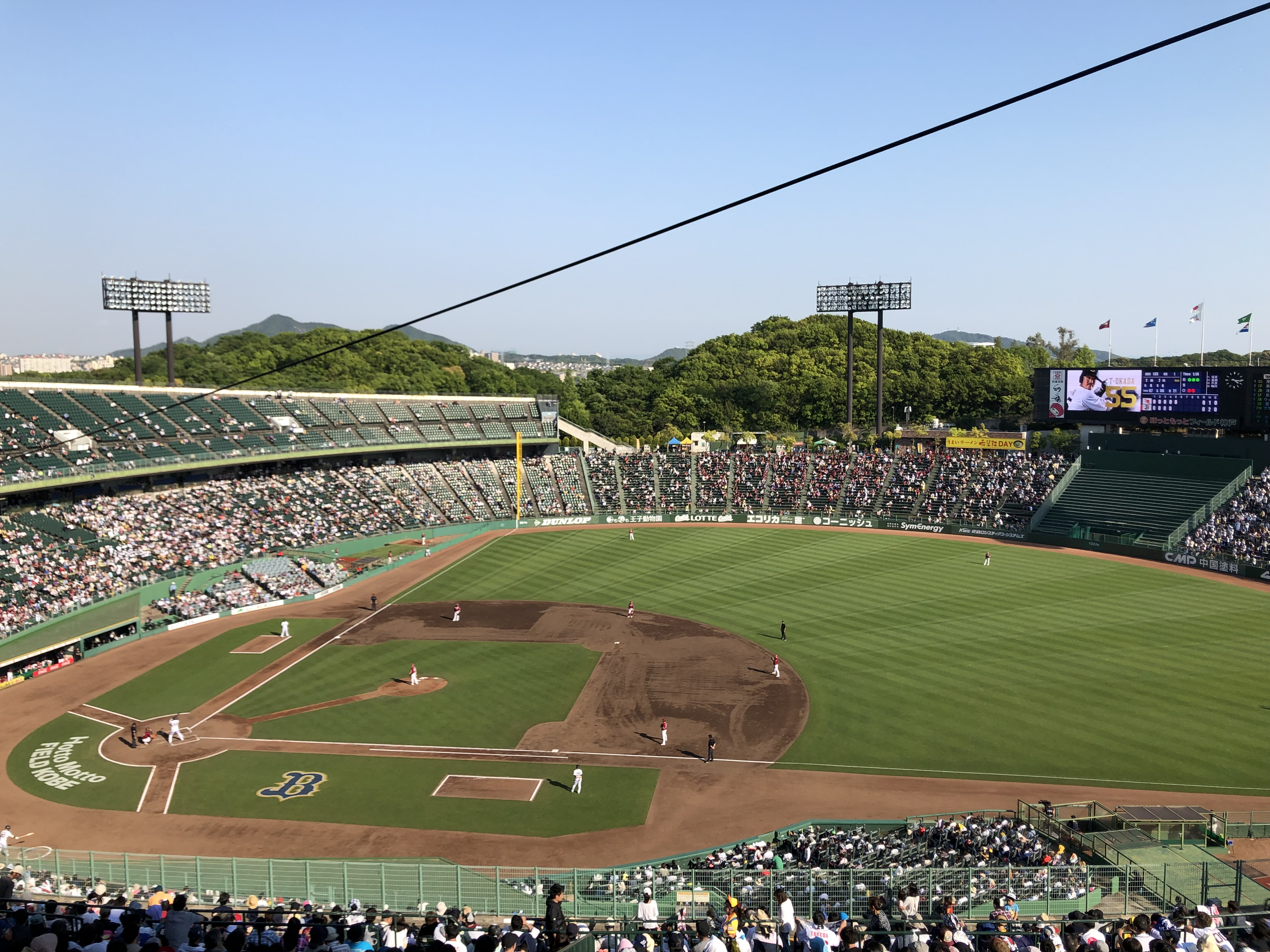
- Interactive map of Hotto Motto Field Kobe
- Location: Kobe Sports Park, Suma-ku, Kobe, Japan
- Coordinates: 34°40′50.37″N 135°4′24.3″E
- Owner: Kobe City
- Operator: Orix Baseball Club
- Field size: left field: 99.1 m (325 ft) center: 122 m (400 ft) right field: 99.1 m (325 ft)
- Public transit: Kobe Municipal Subway: Seishin-Yamate Line at Sōgō Undō Kōen

Construction
- Opened: March 6, 1988

Tenants
- Orix Bluewave/Orix Buffaloes (Pacific League/NPB) 1991–present Tohoku Rakuten Golden Eagles (Pacific League/NPB) 2011

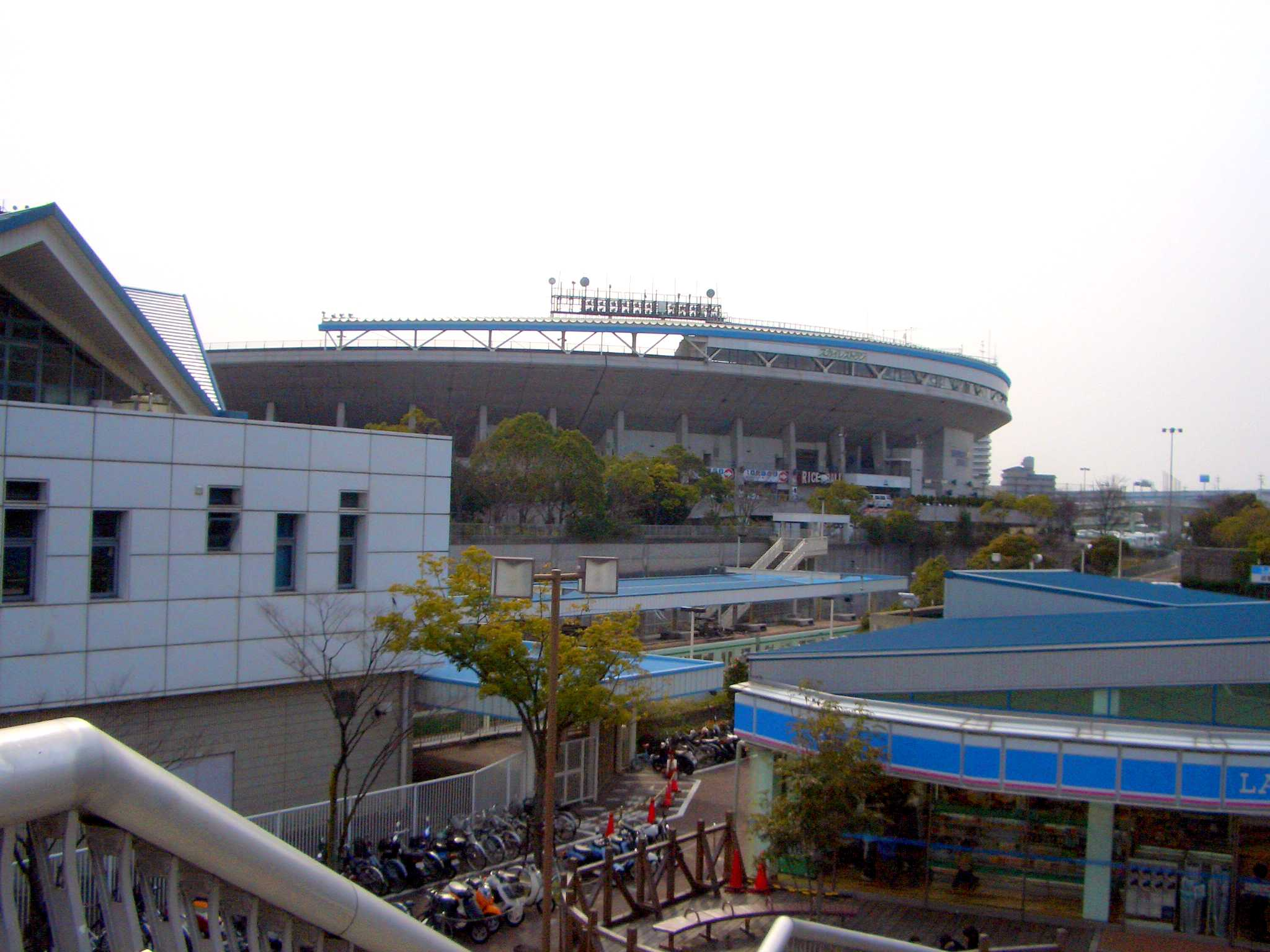
Kobe Sports Park Baseball Stadium (Hotto Motto Field Kobe)

Kobe Sports Park Baseball Stadium (神戸総合運動公園野球場, Kōbe Sōgō-Undō-Kōen Yakyūjō) or officially Hotto Motto Field Kobe (ほっともっとフィールド神戸) is a baseball park at the Kobe Sports Park in Kobe, Japan. It is primarily used for baseball, and is one of two home fields for the Orix Buffaloes, the other being the Kyocera Dome Osaka.

The Kobe stadium is occasionally used when the Osaka Dome hosts Hanshin Tigers games, due to their home field, Koshien Stadium, being used for the Spring Koshien and Summer Koshien baseball tournaments.

The stadium's field is one of three ballparks in Japan to have an American-style baseball field,: An all-grass outfield and infield, with dirt basepaths. It opened on March 6, 1988 and holds 35,000 people.

== Sponsoring names of Kobe Sports Park Baseball Stadium ==
- 1988–2002: Green Stadium Kobe (グリーンスタジアム神戸)
- 2003–2004: Yahoo! BB Stadium (Yahoo! BBスタジアム)
- 2005–2010: Skymark Stadium (スカイマークスタジアム)
- 2011–present: Hotto Motto Field Kobe (ほっともっとフィールド神戸)

Kobe Baseball Stadium is the first baseball park in Japan to install naming rights.

== Access ==
- Kobe Municipal Subway Seishin-Yamate Line: Sogo Undo Koen Station (S13)

== See also ==
- Skymark Airlines
- Hotto Motto
