= Daniel (footballer, born 1970) =

Brazilian footballer

Personal information
- Full name: Daniel Conceicao Silva
- Date of birth: October 10, 1970 (age 56)
- Place of birth: Brazil
- Height: 1.75 m (5 ft 9 in)
- Position: Midfielder

Senior career*
Years	Team	Apps	(Gls)
1997	Kyoto Purple Sanga		
2001–2002	Vissel Kobe		
- * Club domestic league appearances and goals

Daniel Conceicao Silva (born October 10, 1970) is a former Brazilian football player.

== Career statistics ==
Appearances and goals by club, season and competition
Club	Season	League			Emperor's Cup		J.League Cup		Total	
Club	Season	Division	Apps	Goals	Apps	Goals	Apps	Goals	Apps	Goals
Kyoto Purple Sanga	1997	J1 League	24	7	2	0	0	0	26	7
Vissel Kobe	2001	J1 League	29	7	1	0	3	1	33	8
Vissel Kobe	2002	J1 League	11	1	0	0	5	1	16	2
Career total			64	15	3	0	8	2	75	17
