= 2010 Tokyo Verdy season =

Tokyo Verdy
2010 season
- Manager: Ryoichi Kawakatsu
- Stadium: Ajinomoto Stadium
- J. League 2: 5th
- Emperor's Cup: 2nd Round
- Top goalscorer: Kazuki Hiramoto (10)

2010 Tokyo Verdy season

== Competitions ==
Competitions	Position
J. League 2	5th / 19 clubs
Emperor's Cup	2nd Round

== Player statistics ==
No.	Pos.	Player	D.o.B. (Age)	Height / Weight	J. League 2		Emperor's Cup		Total	
No.	Pos.	Player	D.o.B. (Age)	Height / Weight	Apps	Goals	Apps	Goals	Apps	Goals
1	GK	Yoichi Doi	July 25, 1973 (aged 36)	cm / kg	34	0				
2	DF	Kensuke Fukuda	July 24, 1984 (aged 25)	cm / kg	35	1				
3	DF	Masaki Yoshida	April 10, 1984 (aged 25)	cm / kg	19	0				
4	DF	Masaki Iida	September 15, 1985 (aged 24)	cm / kg	0	0				
5	MF	Naoya Saeki	December 18, 1977 (aged 32)	cm / kg	30	1				
6	MF	Tomo Sugawara	June 3, 1976 (aged 33)	cm / kg	7	0				
7	MF	Hiroki Kawano	March 30, 1990 (aged 19)	cm / kg	29	3				
8	MF	Kosei Shibasaki	August 28, 1984 (aged 25)	cm / kg	35	3				
10	MF	Takuro Kikuoka	June 30, 1985 (aged 24)	cm / kg	34	3				
13	FW	Taira Inoue	April 11, 1983 (aged 26)	cm / kg	21	0				
14	DF	Seitaro Tomisawa	July 8, 1982 (aged 27)	cm / kg	31	2				
15	MF	Shinichi Mukai	June 15, 1985 (aged 24)	cm / kg	1	0				
16	FW	Kazunori Iio	February 23, 1982 (aged 28)	cm / kg	31	5				
17	DF	Yukio Tsuchiya	July 31, 1974 (aged 35)	cm / kg	35	2				
18	MF	Kento Tsurumaki	June 29, 1987 (aged 22)	cm / kg	0	0				
19	MF	Takuma Abe	December 5, 1987 (aged 22)	cm / kg	20	3				
20	MF	Yu Tomidokoro	April 21, 1990 (aged 19)	cm / kg	0	0				
21	GK	Tomoyuki Suzuki	December 20, 1985 (aged 24)	cm / kg	0	0				
22	MF	Takuya Wada	July 28, 1990 (aged 19)	cm / kg	10	0				
23	DF	Shohei Takahashi	October 27, 1991 (aged 18)	cm / kg	20	1				
24	FW	Toshiyuki Takagi	May 25, 1991 (aged 18)	cm / kg	25	6				
25	FW	Kazuki Hiramoto	August 18, 1981 (aged 28)	cm / kg	32	10				
26	GK	Takahiro Shibasaki	May 23, 1982 (aged 27)	cm / kg	2	0				
27	MF	Koya Shimizu	June 15, 1982 (aged 27)	cm / kg	1	0				
28	DF	Ryo Nurishi	May 1, 1986 (aged 23)	cm / kg	0	0				
29	MF	Lee Chi-Song	August 16, 1987 (aged 22)	cm / kg	0	0				
30	MF	Hiroki Ebisawa	March 17, 1988 (aged 21)	cm / kg	0	0				
31	DF	Ryoji Fukui	August 7, 1987 (aged 22)	cm / kg	1	0				
32	MF	Adebayo Adigun	November 15, 1990 (aged 19)	cm / kg	0	0				
33	MF	Yoshiaki Takagi	December 9, 1992 (aged 17)	cm / kg	33	5				
34	GK	Niall Killoran	April 7, 1992 (aged 17)	cm / kg	0	0				
36	DF	Colin Killoran	April 7, 1992 (aged 17)	cm / kg	0	0				
37	MF	Yuki Kobayashi	April 24, 1992 (aged 17)	cm / kg	4	0				
38	FW	Shuto Minami	May 5, 1993 (aged 16)	cm / kg	2	1				

== Other pages ==
- (in Japanese) J. League official site
