= Tomo Sugawara =

Japanese footballer

Tomo Sugawara 菅原 智
Personal information
- Full name: Tomo Sugawara
- Date of birth: June 3, 1976 (age 50)
- Place of birth: Muroran, Hokkaido, Japan
- Height: 1.74 m (5 ft 9 in)
- Position: Midfielder

Team information
- Current team: Vissel Kobe (Assistant)

Youth career
- 1989–1994: Verdy Kawasaki

Senior career*
Years	Team	Apps	(Gls)
1995–1998	Verdy Kawasaki	51	(3)
1999	Santos	4	(1)
2000–2005	Vissel Kobe	114	(1)
2006–2011	Tokyo Verdy	115	(0)
Total		284	(5)
Medal record
Tokyo Verdy
Runner-up	J1 League	1995
Runner-up	J.League Cup	1996
Winner	Emperor's Cup	1996
- * Club domestic league appearances and goals

Tomo Sugawara (菅原 智, Sugawara Tomo; born June 3, 1976) is a former Japanese football player, he is currently assistant manager of Vissel Kobe.

== Playing career ==
Sugawara was born in Muroran on June 3, 1976. He joined Verdy Kawasaki (later Tokyo Verdy) from youth team in 1995. On July 19, he debuted and scored goal against Urawa Reds. From 1996, he played many matches as defensive midfielder and center back. The club won the champions 1996 Emperor's Cup and 2nd place 1996 J.League Cup. In 1999, he moved to Brazil and played for Santos. In 2000, he returned to Japan and joined Vissel Kobe. He played many matches as defensive midfielder. In 2006, he returned to Tokyo Verdy. Although the club was relegated J2 League from 2006, he played many matches and the club was promoted to J1 in 2008. However the club was relegated to J2 in a year and his opportunity to play decreased from 2009. He retired end of 2011 season.

He was well known for receiving a red card from the referee Jumpei Iida and being sent off in just 9 seconds after the kick-off of J2 League match between Tokyo Verdy and Sagan Tosu, held on April 15, 2009. This is the fastest sending-off record in the world football history, however, it has not been filed for a Guinness Book of Records until now.

== Club statistics ==
Club performance			League		Cup		League Cup		Continental		Total	
Season	Club	League	Apps	Goals	Apps	Goals	Apps	Goals	Apps	Goals	Apps	Goals
Japan			League		Emperor's Cup		J.League Cup		Asia		Total	
1995	Verdy Kawasaki	J1 League	1	1	0	0	-		-		1	1
1996	Verdy Kawasaki	J1 League	18	1	5	0	14	0	-		37	1
1997	Verdy Kawasaki	J1 League	20	0	1	0	3	0	-		24	0
1998	Verdy Kawasaki	J1 League	12	1	3	0	4	0	-		19	1
Brazil			League		Copa do Brasil		League Cup		South America		Total	
1999	Santos	Série A	4	1							4	1
Japan			League		Emperor's Cup		J.League Cup		Asia		Total	
2000	Vissel Kobe	J1 League	22	0	0	0	4	0	-		26	0
2001	Vissel Kobe	J1 League	15	0	2	0	2	0	-		19	0
2002	Vissel Kobe	J1 League	21	0	0	0	1	0	-		22	0
2003	Vissel Kobe	J1 League	29	0	3	0	6	0	-		38	0
2004	Vissel Kobe	J1 League	12	0	1	0	4	0	-		17	0
2005	Vissel Kobe	J1 League	15	1	0	0	6	0	-		21	1
2006	Tokyo Verdy	J2 League	32	0	0	0	-		1	0	33	0
2007	Tokyo Verdy	J2 League	33	0	0	0	-		-		33	0
2008	Tokyo Verdy	J1 League	23	0	1	0	3	0	-		27	0
2009	Tokyo Verdy	J2 League	18	0	0	0	-		-		18	0
2010	Tokyo Verdy	J2 League	7	0	1	0	-		-		8	0
2011	Tokyo Verdy	J2 League	2	0	0	0	-		-		2	0
Country	Japan		280	4	17	0	47	0	1	0	345	4
Country	Brazil		4	1							4	1
Total			284	5	17	0	47	0	1	0	349	5
