= Ataliba (footballer, born 1979) =

Brazilian footballer (born 1979)

Personal information
- Full name: Carlos Eduardo Soares
- Date of birth: 2 March 1979 (age 47)
- Place of birth: Campinas, Brazil
- Height: 1.80 m (5 ft 11 in)
- Position: Midfielder

Senior career*
Years	Team	Apps	(Gls)
1997–1998	Ponte Preta	1	(0)
1999–2001	Coritiba	34	(1)
2002	Vissel Kobe	7	(1)
2002	Coritiba	2	(0)
2003	Sport Recife		
2004	Coritiba	39	(1)
2005	Atlético Mineiro	15	(1)
2006	Botafogo	15	(0)
2007	Sport Recife	0	(0)
2007	CRB	15	(0)
2008	Kyoto Sanga	17	(1)
2009	Marília	14	(1)
2009	Vila Nova		
2010	Paulínia		
2010–2012	Shahrdari Tabriz	26	(4)
2012–2014	São José	4	(0)
- * Club domestic league appearances and goals

Carlos Eduardo Soares or simply Ataliba (born 2 March 1979), is a Brazilian former football midfielder.

Ataliba previously played for Coritiba, Atlético Mineiro and Botafogo.

== Club statistics ==
Club performance			League		Cup		League Cup		Total	
Season	Club	League	Apps	Goals	Apps	Goals	Apps	Goals	Apps	Goals
Brazil			League		Copa do Brasil		League Cup		Total	
1998	Ponte Preta	Série A	1	0						
1999	Coritiba	Série A	11	0						
2000	Coritiba	Série A	17	0						
2001	Coritiba	Série A	6	1						
Japan			League		Emperor's Cup		J.League Cup		Total	
2002	Vissel Kobe	J1 League	7	1						
Brazil			League		Copa do Brasil		League Cup		Total	
2002	Coritiba	Série A	2	0						
2003	Sport Recife	Série B								
2004	Coritiba	Série A	39	1						
2005	Atlético Mineiro	Série A	15	1						
2006	Botafogo	Série A	15	0						
2007	Sport Recife	Série A	0	0						
2007	CRB	Série B	15	0						
Japan			League		Emperor's Cup		J.League Cup		Total	
2008	Kyoto Sanga FC	J1 League	17	1						
Brazil			League		Copa do Brasil		League Cup		Total	
2009	Marília	Série C								
Iran			League		Hazfi Cup		League Cup		Total	
2010-11	Shahrdari Tabriz	Persian Gulf Cup	18	4	0	0	-		18	4
Country	Brazil		121	3						
Country	Japan		24	2						
Country	Iran		18	4	0	0	-		18	4
Total			163	9						
