= Yohei Taniike =

Japanese footballer

Yohei Taniike 谷池 洋平
Personal information
- Full name: Yohei Taniike
- Date of birth: April 5, 1977 (age 49)
- Place of birth: Minamiawaji, Hyogo, Japan
- Height: 1.78 m (5 ft 10 in)
- Position: Defender

Youth career
- 1993–1995: Shimizu Commercial High School
- 1996–1999: University of Tsukuba

Senior career*
Years	Team	Apps	(Gls)
2000	Vissel Kobe	0	(0)
2001–2006	Tokushima Vortis	150	(14)
2007	Tochigi SC	27	(2)
2008–2013	Sony Sendai	146	(4)
Total		323	(20)
- * Club domestic league appearances and goals

Yohei Taniike (谷池 洋平, Taniike Yohei; born April 5, 1977) is a former Japanese football player.

== Playing career ==
Taniike was born in Minamiawaji on April 5, 1977. After graduating from University of Tsukuba, he joined J1 League club Vissel Kobe based in his local in 2000. However he could not play at all in the match in 2000. In 2001, he moved to Japan Football League (JFL) club Otsuka Pharmaceutical (later Tokushima Vortis). He became a regular player as center back. The club also won the champions in 2003 and 2004 and was promoted to J2 League from 2005. Although he played many matches as right back of three backs defense in 2005, he could hardly play in the match in 2006. In 2007, he moved to JFL club Tochigi SC and played many matches. In 2008, he moved to JFL club Sony Sendai. He played many matches as regular player for a long time and retired at the end of the 2013 season.

== Club statistics ==
Club performance			League		Cup		League Cup		Total	
Season	Club	League	Apps	Goals	Apps	Goals	Apps	Goals	Apps	Goals
Japan			League		Emperor's Cup		J.League Cup		Total	
2000	Vissel Kobe	J1 League	0	0	0	0	0	0	0	0
2001	Otsuka Pharmaceutical	Football League	29	4	0	0	-		29	4
2002	Otsuka Pharmaceutical	Football League	17	3	0	0	-		17	3
2003	Otsuka Pharmaceutical	Football League	29	4	0	0	-		29	4
2004	Otsuka Pharmaceutical	Football League	29	2	1	0	-		30	2
2005	Tokushima Vortis	J2 League	40	1	2	0	-		42	1
2006	Tokushima Vortis	J2 League	6	0	1	0	-		7	0
2007	Tochigi SC	Football League	27	2	2	0	-		29	2
2008	Sony Sendai	Football League	34	2	3	0	-		37	2
2009	Sony Sendai	Football League	33	1	2	0	-		35	1
2010	Sony Sendai	Football League	22	0	0	0	-		22	0
2011	Sony Sendai	Football League	14	1	2	1	-		16	2
2012	Sony Sendai	Football League	31	0	2	0	-		33	0
2013	Sony Sendai	Football League	12	0	0	0	-		12	0
Career total			323	20	15	1	0	0	338	21
