= Kazuhiro Mori (footballer) =

Japanese footballer

Kazuhiro Mori 森 一紘
Personal information
- Full name: Kazuhiro Mori
- Date of birth: April 17, 1981 (age 45)
- Place of birth: Osaka, Japan
- Height: 1.72 m (5 ft 7 1/2 in)
- Position: Midfielder

Youth career
- 1997–1999: Vissel Kobe

Senior career*
Years	Team	Apps	(Gls)
2000–2004	Vissel Kobe	27	(0)
2005–2006	Rosso Kumamoto	20	(1)
2007	Banditonce Kobe	3	(0)
Total		50	(1)
- * Club domestic league appearances and goals

Kazuhiro Mori (森 一紘, Mori Kazuhiro; born April 17, 1981) is a Japanese former professional football midfielder.

== Playing career ==
Mori was born in Osaka Prefecture on April 17, 1981. He joined J1 League club Vissel Kobe from their youth team in 2000. Although he played several matches as midfielder like every season, he could not play many matches. In 2005, he moved to Regional Leagues club Rosso Kumamoto. Although he could not play many matches, the club was promoted to Japan Football League from 2006. In 2007, he moved to Regional Leagues club Banditonce Kobe. However he could hardly play in the match and retired at the end of the 2007 season.

== Club statistics ==
Club performance			League		Cup		League Cup		Total	
Season	Club	League	Apps	Goals	Apps	Goals	Apps	Goals	Apps	Goals
Japan			League		Emperor's Cup		J.League Cup		Total	
2000	Vissel Kobe	J1 League	8	0	1	0	1	0	10	0
2001	Vissel Kobe	J1 League	8	0	2	0	3	1	13	1
2002	Vissel Kobe	J1 League	1	0	0	0	0	0	1	0
2003	Vissel Kobe	J1 League	6	0	0	0	0	0	6	0
2004	Vissel Kobe	J1 League	4	0	0	0	4	0	8	0
2005	Rosso Kumamoto	Regional Leagues	5	0	1	0	-		6	0
2006	Rosso Kumamoto	Football League	15	1	0	0	-		15	1
2007	Banditonce Kobe	Regional Leagues	3	0	0	0	-		3	0
Career total			50	1	4	0	8	1	62	2
