= Masamitsu Kanemoto =

Japanese footballer

Masamitsu Kanemoto 兼本 正光
Personal information
- Full name: Masamitsu Kanemoto
- Date of birth: October 17, 1962 (age 64)
- Place of birth: Hyogo, Japan
- Height: 1.76 m (5 ft 9 1/2 in)
- Position: Goalkeeper

Youth career
- 1978–1980: Mikage Technical High School

Senior career*
| Years | Team | Apps | (Gls) |
| 1981–1998 | Vissel Kobe | | |
| 1999–2004 | Fagiano Okayama | | |
- * Club domestic league appearances and goals

Masamitsu Kanemoto (兼本 正光, Kanemoto Masamitsu; born October 17, 1962) is a former Japanese football player.

== Playing career ==
Kanemoto was born in Hyogo Prefecture on October 17, 1962. After graduating from high school, he joined Regional Leagues club Kawasaki Steel (later Vissel Kobe) based in his local in 1981. He played many matches as goalkeeper and the club was promoted to Japan Soccer League in 1986. In 1992, Japan Soccer League was folded and founded the club joined new league Japan Football League. Although he played as regular goalkeeper until 1994, his opportunity to play decreased behind new member Ryuji Ishizue from 1995. The club won the 2nd place in 1996 and was promoted to J1 League from 1997. In 1999, he moved to Prefectural Leagues club River Free Kickers (later Fagiano Okayama). He retired end of 2004 season.

== Club statistics ==
| Club performance | | | League | | Cup | | League Cup | | Total | |
| Season | Club | League | Apps | Goals | Apps | Goals | Apps | Goals | Apps | Goals |
| Japan | | | League | | Emperor's Cup | | J.League Cup | | Total | |
|---|---|---|---|---|---|---|---|---|---|---|
| 1981 | Kawasaki Steel | Regional Leagues | | | | | | | | |
| 1982 | Kawasaki Steel | Regional Leagues | | | | | | | | |
| 1983 | Kawasaki Steel | Regional Leagues | | | | | | | | |
| 1984 | Kawasaki Steel | Regional Leagues | | | | | | | | |
| 1985 | Kawasaki Steel | Regional Leagues | | | | | | | | |
| 1986/87 | Kawasaki Steel | JSL Division 2 | | | | | | | | |
| 1987/88 | Kawasaki Steel | JSL Division 2 | | | | | | | | |
| 1988/89 | Kawasaki Steel | JSL Division 2 | | | | | | | | |
| 1989/90 | Kawasaki Steel | JSL Division 2 | 28 | 0 | - | | 2 | 0 | 30 | 0 |
| 1990/91 | Kawasaki Steel | JSL Division 2 | 30 | 0 | - | | 1 | 0 | 31 | 0 |
| 1991/92 | Kawasaki Steel | JSL Division 2 | 30 | 0 | | | 1 | 0 | 31 | 0 |
| 1992 | Kawasaki Steel | Football League | 18 | 0 | | | - | | 18 | 0 |
| 1993 | Kawasaki Steel | Football League | 18 | 0 | 2 | 0 | - | | 20 | 0 |
| 1994 | Kawasaki Steel | Football League | 30 | 0 | 2 | 0 | - | | 32 | 0 |
| 1995 | Vissel Kobe | Football League | 7 | 0 | 0 | 0 | - | | 7 | 0 |
| 1996 | Vissel Kobe | Football League | 0 | 0 | 0 | 0 | - | | 0 | 0 |
| 1997 | Vissel Kobe | J1 League | 5 | 0 | 0 | 0 | 1 | 0 | 6 | 0 |
| 1998 | Vissel Kobe | J1 League | 1 | 0 | 0 | 0 | 0 | 0 | 1 | 0 |
| Total | | | 167 | 0 | 4 | 0 | 5 | 0 | 176 | 0 |
