= Kobe Universiade Memorial Stadium =

Stadium in Japan

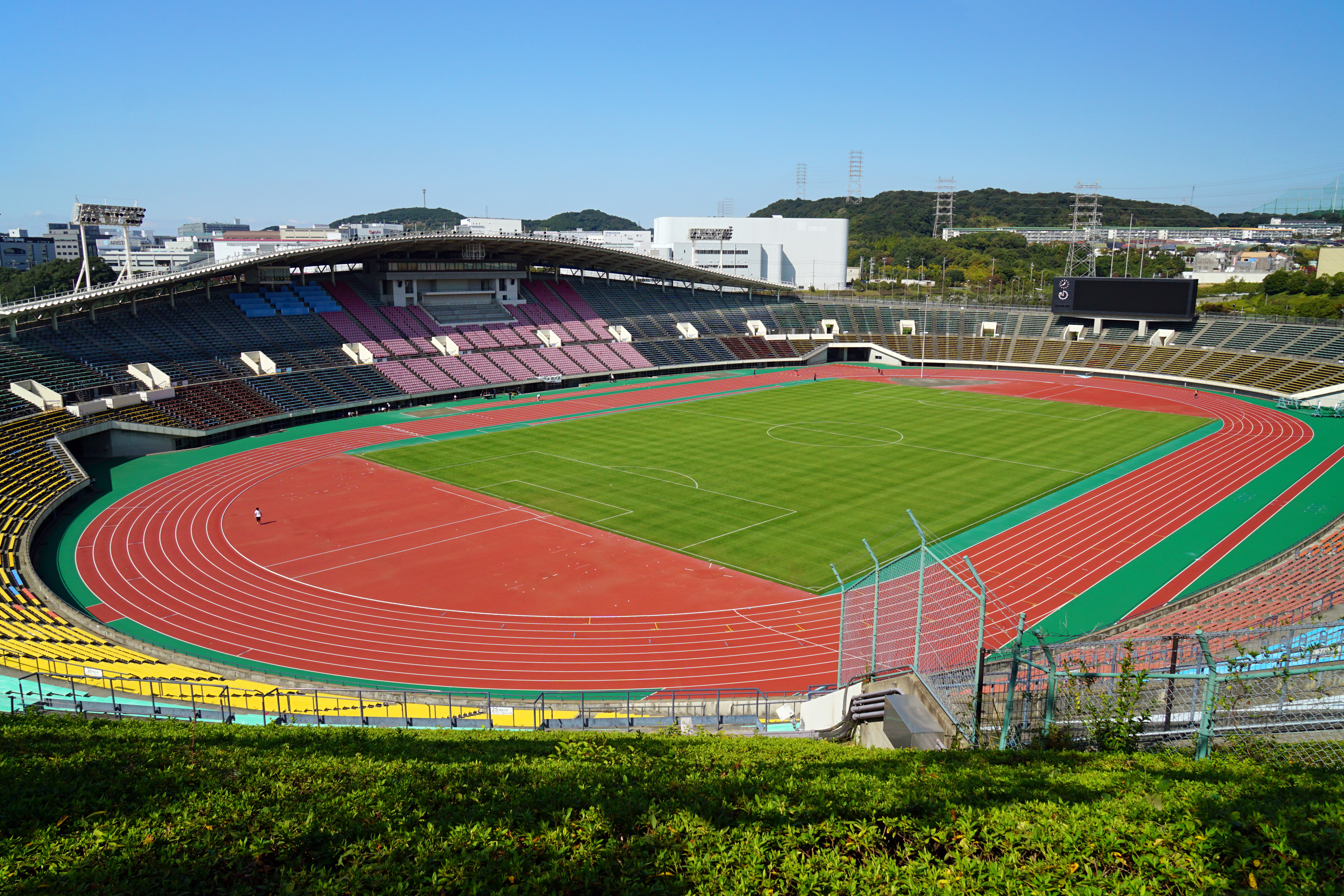
- Interactive map of Kobe Universiade Memorial Stadium
- Location: Midoridai, Suma-ku, Kobe, Japan
- Coordinates: 34°40′55.7″N 135°4′48.98″E
- Owner: Kobe City
- Capacity: 45,000
- Public transit: Kobe Municipal Subway: Seishin-Yamate Line at Sōgō Undō Kōen

Construction
- Opened: October 1984

Kobe Universiade Memorial Stadium (神戸総合運動公園ユニバー記念競技場) is a multi-purpose stadium at the Kobe Sports Park, located in Suma-ku, Kobe, Japan. It is mostly used for football matches. The stadium can hold 45,000 people.

== History ==
It was built in October 1984 for the 1985 Summer Universiade. It hosted the 2006 61st National Sports Festival of Japan main stadium. Local football club Vissel Kobe has played some high attendance matches at the stadium.

Japan national football team played some of their home matches here, including a 3-0 win over Hong Kong in a World Cup qualifier in August 1985.

On May 9, 2007, the Japan national rugby union team played the Classic All Blacks here. The result was a win for the latter, 36–25. Other rugby games, including Top League games are sometimes played at the stadium.

Preceded by Guangdong Olympic Stadium; Guangzhou	Asian Athletics Championships; Venue; 2011	Succeeded by Shree Shiv Chhatrapati Sports Complex; Pune
Preceded by Commonwealth Stadium; Canada	Universiade; 1985	Succeeded by Stadion Maksimir; Yugoslavia
