= 2012 Yokohama FC season =

Yokohama FC
2012 season
- Manager: Motohiro Yamaguchi
- J.League Division 2: -
- Emperor's Cup: -
Home colours	Away colours

The 2012 Yokohama FC season sees Yokohama FC compete in J.League Division 2 for the fifth consecutive season. Yokohama FC are also competing in the 2012 Emperor's Cup.

== Competitions ==
=== J. League ===
==== League table ====
Pos	Team	Pld	W	D	L	GF	GA	GD	Pts	Promotion or relegation
2	Shonan Bellmare (P)	42	20	15	7	66	43	+23	75	Promotion to 2013 J.League Division 1
3	Kyoto Sanga	42	23	5	14	61	45	+16	74	Qualification for promotion playoffs
4	Yokohama FC	42	22	7	13	62	45	+17	73	Qualification for promotion playoffs
5	JEF United Chiba	42	21	9	12	61	33	+28	72	Qualification for promotion playoffs
6	Oita Trinita (O, P)	42	21	8	13	59	40	+19	71	Qualification for promotion playoffs

Updated to match(es) played on 11 November 2012. Source: J.League Division 2
Rules for classification: 1st points; 2nd goal differential; 3rd goals scored; 4th head-to-head results; 5th disciplinary points; 6th draw. If two clubs are tied for first place, both clubs will be declared champions.
(O) Play-off winners; (P) Promoted

==== Matches ====
4 March 2012 1	Mito HollyHock	2 - 1	Yokohama F.C.	K's denki Stadium Mito
Sunday 13:05	Ozawa 42'; Shimada 69'	Report	10' Okubo	Attendance: 5,817; Referee: Kawai

11 March 2012 2	Yokohama F.C.	0 - 0	Ehime F.C.	NHK Spring Mitsuzawa Football Stadium
Sunday 16:04		Report		Attendance: 7,026; Referee: Kubota

17 March 2012 3	JEF United Chiba	3 - 0	Yokohama F.C.	Fukuda Denshi Arena
Saturday	Fukai 12', 70'; Hyodo 66'	Report		Attendance: 6,959; Referee: Fukushima

20 March 2012 4	Yokohama F.C.	0 - 0	Tokyo Verdy	NHK Spring Mitsuzawa Football Stadium
Tuesday 19:03		Report		Attendance: 3,549; Referee: Yoshida

25 March 2012 5	Yokohama F.C.	0 - 2	Ventforet Kofu	NHK Spring Mitsuzawa Football Stadium
Sunday 14:03		Report	43' Takasaki; 67' Davi	Attendance: 6,071; Referee: Kimura

1 April 2012 6	Thespa Kusatsu	1 - 1	Yokohama F.C.	Shoda Shoyu Stadium Gunma
Sunday	Kim Seng-Yong 64'; Nagata (yellow card) 69'; Heberty (yellow card) 90+3'	Report	Miura (yellow card) 43'; Sato (yellow card) 59'; Nagai 75'	Attendance: 6,891; Referee: Tomohiro Tsukada

8 April 2012 7	Yokohama F.C.	1 - 2	Montedio Yamagata	NHK Spring Mitsuzawa Football Stadium
17:00 JST	Takeoka 1'	Report	Akiba 43'; Masaki Miyasaka 59'	Attendance: 5,014; Referee: Tomoya Maeda

15 April 2012 8	Shonan Bellmare	3 - 2	Yokohama F.C.	Shonan BMW Stadium Hiratsuka
17:00 JST	Han Kook-Young (yellow card) 14'; Baba 36'; Nagaki (yellow card) 48'; Kaoru Takayama 52'; Kikuchi 68'	Report	Sugiyama (yellow card) 35'; Uchida (yellow card) 43' (goal) 46'; Takeoka 85'	Attendance: 7,111; Referee: Yuichi Nishimura

22 April 2012 9	Yokohama F.C.	2 - 1	Kyoto Sanga	NHK Spring Mitsuzawa Football Stadium
15:00 JST	Hakkaku (yellow card) 16'; Fujita 31', 49'	Report	Someya (yellow card) 42'; Fukumura (yellow card) 67'; Hwang Te-Song (yellow card) 71'; Hara 90+5'	Attendance: 7,329; Referee: Koichiro Fukushima

27 April 2012 10	F.C. Gifu	0 - 2	Yokohama F.C.	Gifu Nagaragawa Stadium
20:00 JST		Report	Tahara 33', 65' (yellow card) 86'	Attendance: 3,540; Referee: Koei Koya

30 April 2012 11	Yokohama F.C.	2 - 4	F.C. Machida Zelvia	NHK Spring Mitsuzawa Football Stadium
14:00 JST	Morimoto (yellow card) 6'; Fujita 69', 82'; Nakazato (yellow card) 84'	Report	Suzuki 33', 55', 72'; Tashiro (yellow card) 42'; Hiramoto 44'	Attendance: 7,118; Referee: Hiroyuki Onishi

3 May 2012 12	Yokohama F.C.	0 - 1	Fagiano Okayama	NHK Spring Mitsuzawa Football Stadium
17:00 JST	Sugiyama (yellow card) 62'	Report	Ishihara (yellow card) 52'; Kawamata 68'	Attendance: 2,803; Referee: Shoichiro Mikami

6 May 2012 13	Giravanz Kitakyushu	1 - 2	Yokohama F.C.	Honjō Athletic Stadium
20:00 JST	Tada (yellow card) 6'; Ikemoto 71'	Report	Nakazato (yellow card) 7'; Fujita 19', 47'; Abe (yellow card) 30'; Schneider (yellow card) 44'; Sugiyama (yellow card) 69'	Attendance: 3,702; Referee: Hiromichi Oka

13 May 2012 14	Yokohama F.C.	3 - 0	Kataller Toyama	NHK Spring Mitsuzawa Football Stadium
14:00 JST	Nakazato 34'; Takachi 50'; Sato 76'	Report	Ikehata (yellow card) 75'; Kurobe (yellow card) 77'	Attendance: 5,259; Referee: Tomoya Maeda

20 May 2012 15	Matsumoto Yamaga	0 - 2	Yokohama F.C.	Matsumotodaira Football Stadium
14:00 JST	Iida (yellow card) 60'; Tetsuto (yellow card) 77'	Report	Nozaki 69'; Sato 78'	Attendance: 13,062; Referee: Hiroshi Yamauchi

27 May 2012 16	Gainare Tottori	2 - 5	Yokohama F.C.	Tottori Bank Bird Stadium
14:00 JST	Sumida 4', 69'; Okuyama (yellow card) 78'	Report	Takeoka 26', 48'; Tahara 39'; Fujita 45'; Miura 80'	Attendance: 5,016; Referee: Yuki Noda

2 June 2012 17	Yokohama F.C.	2 - 0	Roasso Kumamoto	NHK Spring Mitsuzawa Football Stadium
17:00 JST	Takeoka 44'; Morimoto (yellow card) 75'; Kaio 90+2'	Report	Yabu (yellow card) 32'	Attendance: 5,509; Referee: Hiroyuki Onishi

9 June 2012 18	Tokushima Vortis	1 - 2	Yokohama F.C.	Pocarisweat Stadium
17:00 JST	Miyazaki 10'; Tsuda (yellow card) 25'	Report	Fujita 21' (pen.); Kaio 80'	Attendance: 4,858; Referee: Kazuyuki Hayakawa

13 June 2012 19	Yokohama F.C.	0 - 1	Oita Trinita	NHK Spring Mitsuzawa Football Stadium
20:00 JST	Hakkaku (yellow card) 88'	Report	Tokita (yellow card) 20'; Sakata (yellow card) 53'; Mitsuhira 65'; Nishi (yellow card) 69'	Attendance: 2,639; Referee: Koei Koya

17 June 2012 20	Tochigi S.C.	3 - 4	Yokohama F.C.	Tochigi Green Stadium
19:00 JST	Kikuoka 43'; Sabia 62', 90'	Report	Kaio 24'; Ōkubo 50'; Nozaki 89', 90'	Attendance: 5,041; Referee: Yuichi Nishimura

24 June 2012 21	Yokohama F.C.	1 - 1	Avispa Fukuoka	NHK Spring Mitsuzawa Football Stadium
19:00 JST	Kaio 24' (pen.)	Report	Kamiyama (yellow card) 45+2'; Suzuki (yellow card) 61'; Takahashi 74'; Kobara (yellow card) 90'	Attendance: 8,436; Referee: Masuya Ueda

1 July 2012 22	F.C. Machida Zelvia	0 - 4	Yokohama F.C.	Machida Athletic Stadium
19:00 JST		Report	Horinouchi (yellow card) 20'; Kaio 27'; Sato 45+1'; Onose 67', 85'	Attendance: 3,261; Referee: Hiroshi Yamauchi

8 July 2012 23	Fagiano Okayama	0 - 1	Yokohama F.C.	Kanko Stadium
19:00 JST		Report	Sato (yellow card) 34'; Nozaki 62'; Abe (yellow card) 88'	Attendance: 12,618

15 July 2012 24	Yokohama F.C.	0 - 1	JEF United Ichihara Chiba	NHK Spring Mitsuzawa Football Stadium
19:00 JST	Takachi (yellow card) 79'; Hakkaku (yellow card) 90+3'	Report	Hyodo 26'; Fujita (yellow card) 64'	Attendance: 8,547; Referee: Tetsuro Yoshida

22 July 2012 25	Yokohama F.C.	3 - 1	Gainare Tottori	NHK Spring Mitsuzawa Football Stadium
19:00 JST	Takachi 31'; Sugiyama (yellow card) 53'; Abe 72'; Nozaki 77'	Report	Nagira (yellow card) 66'; Kubo 75'	Attendance: 9,687; Referee: Koji Morikawa

29 July 2012 26	Kataller Toyama	0 - 0	Yokohama F.C.	Toyama Athletic Stadium
19:00 JST	Fukuda (yellow card) 25'	Report	Sugiyama (yellow card) 30'; Sato (yellow card) 51'	Attendance: 4,177; Referee: Yuki Noda

5 August 2012 27	Yokohama F.C.	1 - 0	Shonan Bellmare	NHK Spring Mitsuzawa Football Stadium
19:00 JST	Horinouchi (yellow card) 53'; Hakkaku (yellow card) 55'; Tahara 71'; Schneider (yellow card) 90+2'	Report	Mihara (yellow card) 39'; Nagaki (yellow card) 41'; Yamaguchi (yellow card) 45'	Attendance: 7,616; Referee: (England) Kevin Friend

12 August 2012 28	Montedio Yamagata	0 - 1	Yokohama F.C.	ND Soft Stadium Yamagata
20:00 JST	Akiba (yellow card) 48'; Nishikawa (yellow card) 70'	Report	Sato (yellow card) 21'; Tahara (yellow card) 39'; Ōkubo 56'	Attendance: 10,240; Referee: (Japan) Hiroyoshi Takayama

19 August 2012 29	Kyoto Sanga	2 - 1	Yokohama F.C.	Nishikyogoku Athletic Stadium
20:00 JST	Miyayoshi 10'; Nakamura 61'; Bajalica (yellow card) 76'	Report	Takeoka 74'; Bae Seung-Jin (yellow card) 86'	Attendance: 10,464; Referee: (Japan) Kazuhiko Matsumura

22 August 2012 30	Yokohama F.C.	2 - 1	Mito HollyHock	NHK Spring Mitsuzawa Football Stadium
20:00 JST	Tahara 7'; Watanabe (yellow card) 49'; Takachi 62'; Hakkaku (yellow card) 67'	Report	Omoto (yellow card) 15' (yellow-red card) 43'; Nishioka (yellow card) 44'; Hoshihara 45+1'; Wako (yellow card) 58'; Suzuki (yellow card) 74'; Ozawa (yellow card) 86'	Attendance: 3,752; Referee: (Japan) Tetsuro Yoshida

26 August 2012 31	Ventforet Kofu	2 - 1	Yokohama F.C.	Yamanashi Chuo Bank Stadium
19:00 JST	Davi 52', 73' (yellow card) 87'; Izawa (yellow card) 57'; Tsuda (yellow card) 58'	Report	Horinouchi 28'; Sato (yellow card) 29'	Attendance: 11,875; Referee: (Japan) Jumpei Iida

2 September 2012 32	Yokohama F.C.	1 - 3	Tochigi S.C.	NHK Spring Mitsuzawa Football Stadium
19:00 JST	Takachi (yellow card) 33'; Horinouchi (yellow card) 76'; Tahara 86'	Summary	Sugimoto 13'; Sabia 24'; Paulinho (yellow card) 27'; Toma 57'	Attendance: 5,758; Referee: (Japan) Tomohiro Tsukada

14 September 2012 33	Ehime F.C.	0 - 1	Yokohama F.C.	Ningineer Stadium
20:00	Azuma (yellow card) 47'; Uchida (yellow card) 59'; Watanabe (yellow card) 82'; Sonoda (yellow card) 90+6'	Summary	Tetsuya Okubo 65'; Takanori Nakajima (yellow card) 84'	Attendance: 3,015; Referee: Yoshiro Imamura

17 September 2012 34	Yokohama F.C.	1 - 1	Matsumoto Yamaga	NHK Spring Mitsuzawa Football Stadium
14:00	Morimoto 6'; Sato (yellow card) 74'; Kaio (yellow card) 90+2'	Summary	Choi Su-Bin (yellow card) 64'; Kijima 70'	Attendance: 7,048; Referee: Masuya Ueda

23 September 2012 35	Yokohama F.C.	1 - 0	Tokushima Vortis	NHK Spring Mitsuzawa Football Stadium
15:00	Kaio 41'; Horinouchi (yellow card) 42'	Summary	Fukumoto (yellow card) 77'; Nasukawa (yellow card) 86'	Attendance: 5,173; Referee: Taku Nagaya

30 September 2012 36	Avispa Fukuoka	1 - 1	Yokohama F.C.	Level-5 Stadium
16:00	Suzuki (yellow card) 23'; Yamaguchi (yellow card) 38'; Naruoka 49'	Summary	Kaio 88'	Attendance: 10,902; Referee: Tetsuro Yoshida

7 October 2012 37	Oita Trinita	1 - 2	Yokohama F.C.	Ōita Bank Dome
14:00	Morishima 50' (pen.); Tameda (yellow card) 59'	Summary	Takeoka 6'; Kaio (yellow card) 49' (goal) 57'; Nakazato (yellow card) 55'	Attendance: 10,138; Referee: Kazuyoshi Enomoto

14 October 2012 38	Yokohama F.C.	1 - 2	Giravanz Kitakyushu	NHK Spring Mitsuzawa Football Stadium
14:00	Takachi (yellow card) 37'; Morimoto 53'	Summary	Arai (yellow card) 63'; Satō (yellow card) 66'; Fuji (yellow card) 66'; Hayashi 71'; Hanato 81'	Attendance: 5,543; Referee: Minoru Tojo

21 October 2012 39	Roasso Kumamoto	0 - 1	Yokohama F.C.	Kumamoto Athletics Stadium
14:00	Taketomi (yellow card) 69'	Summary	Harada 45' (o.g.)	Attendance: 6,585; Referee: Shoichiro Mikami

28 October 2012 40	Yokohama F.C.	3 - 0	Thespa Kusatsu	NHK Spring Mitsuzawa Football Stadium
18:00	Horinouchi 40'; Kaio 78', 88'	Summary	Mikuriya (yellow card) 3'; Alex Rafael (red card) 45+1'; Kumabayashi (yellow card) 58'; Kim Seng-Yong (yellow card) 59'	Attendance: 4,899; Referee: Akihiko Ikeuchi

4 November 2012 41	Tokyo Verdy	0 - 1	Yokohama F.C.	Ajinomoto Stadium
16:00	Tsuchiya (yellow card) 90'	Summary	Nozaki (yellow card) 25'; Bae Seung-Jin (yellow card) 57'; Tahara 78'	Attendance: 13,093; Referee: Masuya Ueda

11 November 2012 42	Yokohama F.C.	3 - 2	F.C. Gifu	NHK Spring Mitsuzawa Football Stadium
13:00	Shinichi Terada (yellow card) 21'; Kaio 43'; Morimoto 64'; Sato (yellow card) 68'; Nagai 84'	Summary	Koichi Sato 18', 82'; Someya (yellow card) 55'; Inoue (yellow card) 73'	Attendance: 8,034; Referee: Yuki Noda

== Promotion playoffs ==
18 November 2012 Semi Final	Yokohama F.C.	0 - 4	JEF United Ichihara Chiba	Ōita, Ōita
14:00	Nozaki (yellow card) 15'; Sato (yellow card) 34'; Bae Seung-Jin (yellow card) 62'; Abe (yellow card) 71'	Summary	Sato 16'; Fujita 35', 58'; Yonekura 53'; Yazawa (yellow card) 66'	Stadium: Ōita Bank Dome; Attendance: 10,594; Referee: (Japan) Maasaki Iemoto

=== Emperor's Cup ===
8 September 2012 Round 2	Tochigi S.C.	0 - 1 (a.e.t.)	Yokohama	Utsunomiya, Tochigi
13:00		Report	Kaio 112'	Stadium: Tochigi Green Stadium; Attendance: 1,731; Referee: Kenta Tsukada

10 October 2012 Round 3	Yokohama F. Marinos	2 - 1	Yokohama	Yokohama
19:00	Nakamura 25', 48'	Report	Watanabe 58'	Stadium: Nissan Stadium; Attendance: 8,862; Referee: Nobutsugu Murakami
