= 2017 Yokohama FC season =

Yokohama FC
2017 season
- Manager: Hitoshi Nakata; Yasuhiko Okudera; Edson Tavares
- Stadium: NHK Spring Mitsuzawa Football Stadium
- J2 League: 10th
Home colours	Away colours

2017 Yokohama FC season.

== Squad ==
As of 13 February 2017.

Note: Flags indicate national team as defined under FIFA eligibility rules; some limited exceptions apply. Players may hold more than one non-FIFA nationality.

No.	Pos.	Nation	Player
1	GK	JPN	Yohei Takaoka
2	DF	JPN	Yuta Fujii
3	DF	JPN	Ryo Tadokoro
4	DF	JPN	Masaki Watanabe
5	DF	JPN	Shogo Nishikawa
6	MF	JPN	Takahiro Nakazato
7	MF	JPN	Naoki Nomura
8	MF	JPN	Kensuke Sato
9	FW	JPN	Tomohiro Tsuda
10	MF	JPN	Shinichi Terada
11	FW	JPN	Kazuyoshi Miura
13	MF	JPN	Yosuke Nozaki
14	FW	NOR	Ibba Laajab
15	FW	JPN	Yuki Nakayama
16	DF	JPN	Jumpei Arai

No.	Pos.	Nation	Player
17	DF	JPN	Shuma Kusumoto
18	GK	JPN	Yuta Minami
19	MF	KOR	Jeong Chung-geun
20	DF	NED	Calvin Jong-a-Pin
21	MF	JPN	Asahi Masuyama
22	DF	JPN	Takuya Nagata
25	MF	JPN	Keita Ishii
26	GK	JPN	Akinori Ichikawa
27	FW	JPN	Kosuke Saito
28	MF	JPN	Yota Maejima
29	MF	JPN	Ryotaro Yamamoto
30	DF	JPN	Takanobu Komiyama
39	FW	JPN	Tetsuya Okubo
40	MF	BRA	Leandro Domingues

== J2 League ==
=== League table ===
Pos	Team	Pld	W	D	L	GF	GA	GD	Pts
9	Oita Trinita	42	17	13	12	58	50	+8	64
10	Yokohama FC	42	17	12	13	60	49	+11	63
11	Montedio Yamagata	42	14	17	11	45	47	−2	59

Updated to match(es) played on 28 November 2017. Source: 2017 MEIJI YASUDA J2 LEAGUE League table
Rules for classification: 1) Points; 2) Goal difference; 3) Goals scored

=== Match details ===
J2 League match details
Match	Date	Team	Score	Team	Venue	Attendance
1	2017.02.26	Yokohama FC	1-0	Matsumoto Yamaga FC	NHK Spring Mitsuzawa Football Stadium	13,244
2	2017.03.05	V-Varen Nagasaki	1-1	Yokohama FC	Transcosmos Stadium Nagasaki	5,551
3	2017.03.12	Yokohama FC	1-0	Thespakusatsu Gunma	NHK Spring Mitsuzawa Football Stadium	5,214
4	2017.03.19	FC Gifu	1-2	Yokohama FC	Gifu Nagaragawa Stadium	11,040
5	2017.03.25	Yokohama FC	0-2	Tokushima Vortis	NHK Spring Mitsuzawa Football Stadium	4,124
6	2017.04.02	Avispa Fukuoka	0-0	Yokohama FC	Level5 Stadium	10,464
7	2017.04.08	Yokohama FC	2-0	Kyoto Sanga FC	NHK Spring Mitsuzawa Football Stadium	2,908
8	2017.04.15	FC Machida Zelvia	1-0	Yokohama FC	Machida Stadium	5,034
9	2017.04.22	Yokohama FC	4-0	JEF United Chiba	NHK Spring Mitsuzawa Football Stadium	5,367
10	2017.04.29	Roasso Kumamoto	1-4	Yokohama FC	Egao Kenko Stadium	7,816
11	2017.05.03	Yokohama FC	4-0	Ehime FC	NHK Spring Mitsuzawa Football Stadium	5,182
12	2017.05.07	Tokyo Verdy	1-1	Yokohama FC	Ajinomoto Stadium	9,452
13	2017.05.13	Mito HollyHock	0-0	Yokohama FC	K's denki Stadium Mito	3,028
14	2017.05.17	Yokohama FC	2-1	Kamatamare Sanuki	NHK Spring Mitsuzawa Football Stadium	2,284
15	2017.05.21	Fagiano Okayama	2-1	Yokohama FC	City Light Stadium	8,650
16	2017.05.27	Yokohama FC	1-2	Nagoya Grampus	NHK Spring Mitsuzawa Football Stadium	10,769
17	2017.06.03	Yokohama FC	1-0	Renofa Yamaguchi FC	NHK Spring Mitsuzawa Football Stadium	3,575
18	2017.06.10	Oita Trinita	2-2	Yokohama FC	Oita Bank Dome	11,050
19	2017.06.17	Yokohama FC	0-1	Montedio Yamagata	NHK Spring Mitsuzawa Football Stadium	5,113
20	2017.06.25	Yokohama FC	0-1	Shonan Bellmare	NHK Spring Mitsuzawa Football Stadium	8,656
21	2017.07.01	Zweigen Kanazawa	3-2	Yokohama FC	Ishikawa Athletics Stadium	8,544
22	2017.07.08	Matsumoto Yamaga FC	3-1	Yokohama FC	Matsumotodaira Park Stadium	12,526
23	2017.07.15	Yokohama FC	1-0	FC Gifu	NHK Spring Mitsuzawa Football Stadium	4,455
24	2017.07.22	Yokohama FC	2-1	V-Varen Nagasaki	NHK Spring Mitsuzawa Football Stadium	4,523
25	2017.07.29	Renofa Yamaguchi FC	1-2	Yokohama FC	Ishin Memorial Park Stadium	7,450
26	2017.08.05	Yokohama FC	1-2	Oita Trinita	NHK Spring Mitsuzawa Football Stadium	5,359
27	2017.08.11	Tokushima Vortis	2-2	Yokohama FC	Pocarisweat Stadium	5,958
28	2017.08.16	Kamatamare Sanuki	1-0	Yokohama FC	Pikara Stadium	3,863
29	2017.08.20	Yokohama FC	1-0	Mito HollyHock	NHK Spring Mitsuzawa Football Stadium	3,483
30	2017.08.26	Nagoya Grampus	2-3	Yokohama FC	Toyota Stadium	21,985
31	2017.09.02	Shonan Bellmare	2-2	Yokohama FC	Shonan BMW Stadium Hiratsuka	10,099
32	2017.09.09	Yokohama FC	2-0	Zweigen Kanazawa	NHK Spring Mitsuzawa Football Stadium	7,960
33	2017.09.16	Yokohama FC	1-1	Tokyo Verdy	NHK Spring Mitsuzawa Football Stadium	4,846
34	2017.09.24	Ehime FC	2-3	Yokohama FC	Ningineer Stadium	4,130
35	2017.10.01	Thespakusatsu Gunma	1-1	Yokohama FC	Shoda Shoyu Stadium Gunma	6,674
36	2017.10.07	Yokohama FC	1-3	Avispa Fukuoka	NHK Spring Mitsuzawa Football Stadium	8,017
37	2017.10.14	Montedio Yamagata	2-0	Yokohama FC	ND Soft Stadium Yamagata	7,052
38	2017.10.20	Yokohama FC	2-2	FC Machida Zelvia	Kawasaki Todoroki Stadium	2,943
39	2017.10.28	Kyoto Sanga FC	2-2	Yokohama FC	Kyoto Nishikyogoku Athletic Stadium	5,427
40	2017.11.05	Yokohama FC	2-0	Roasso Kumamoto	NHK Spring Mitsuzawa Football Stadium	8,955
41	2017.11.12	Yokohama FC	1-1	Fagiano Okayama	NHK Spring Mitsuzawa Football Stadium	8,324
42	2017.11.19	JEF United Chiba	2-1	Yokohama FC	Fukuda Denshi Arena	15,994
