= 2018 Yokohama FC season =

Yokohama FC
2018 season
- Manager: Edson Tavares
- Stadium: NHK Spring Mitsuzawa Football Stadium
- J2 League: 3rd
Home colours	Away colours

Yokohama FC was one of 22 teams playing in the Japanese J2 League completion in 2018. They came in third place in the League, and qualified for the promotional playoffs for promotion to the J1 League, but were beaten by Tokyo Verdy in the second round of the promotion competition.

== Squad ==
As of 30 January 2018.

Note: Flags indicate national team as defined under FIFA eligibility rules; some limited exceptions apply. Players may hold more than one non-FIFA nationality.

No.	Pos.	Nation	Player
1	GK	JPN	Yohei Takaoka
2	DF	JPN	Yuta Fujii
3	DF	JPN	Ryo Tadokoro
4	DF	JPN	Masaki Watanabe
6	MF	JPN	Takahiro Nakazato
7	MF	JPN	Naoki Nomura
8	MF	JPN	Kensuke Sato
9	FW	JPN	Akira Toshima
10	FW	NOR	Ibba Laajab
11	FW	JPN	Kazuyoshi Miura
13	DF	KOR	Bae Seung-jin
14	DF	JPN	Kengo Kitazume
15	FW	JPN	Yuki Nakayama
16	DF	JPN	Jumpei Arai
17	MF	JPN	Eijiro Takeda

No.	Pos.	Nation	Player
18	GK	JPN	Yuta Minami
19	MF	KOR	Jeong Chung-geun
20	DF	NED	Calvin Jong-a-Pin
21	GK	JPN	Kaito Yamamoto
22	DF	JPN	Takuya Nagata
24	MF	JPN	Kazuhito Watanabe
25	MF	JPN	Keita Ishii
26	GK	JPN	Akinori Ichikawa
27	FW	JPN	Kosuke Saito
29	MF	JPN	Ryotaro Yamamoto
30	FW	JPN	Ayumu Tachibana
33	DF	JPN	Yasumasa Kawasaki
35	MF	JPN	Daisuke Matsui
40	MF	BRA	Leandro Domingues

== J2 League ==
Match	Date	Team	Score	Team	Venue	Attendance
1	2018.02.25	Yokohama FC	0–0	Matsumoto Yamaga FC	NHK Spring Mitsuzawa Football Stadium	10,779
2	2018.03.03	FC Gifu	0–1	Yokohama FC	Gifu Nagaragawa Stadium	9,331
3	2018.03.11	Yokohama FC	3–0	Ehime FC	NHK Spring Mitsuzawa Football Stadium	4,464
4	2018.03.17	Yokohama FC	0–3	Albirex Niigata	NHK Spring Mitsuzawa Football Stadium	7,700
5	2018.03.21	Montedio Yamagata	2–3	Yokohama FC	ND Soft Stadium Yamagata	5,116
6	2018.03.25	Mito HollyHock	0–0	Yokohama FC	K's denki Stadium Mito	6,300
7	2018.04.01	Yokohama FC	0–4	Zweigen Kanazawa	NHK Spring Mitsuzawa Football Stadium	3,571
8	2018.04.08	Yokohama FC	2–2	Avispa Fukuoka	NHK Spring Mitsuzawa Football Stadium	4,088
9	2018.04.15	Oita Trinita	1–1	Yokohama FC	Oita Bank Dome	8,102
10	2018.04.22	Yokohama FC	0–0	Tochigi SC	NHK Spring Mitsuzawa Football Stadium	3,989
11	2018.04.28	Yokohama FC	1–0	Tokushima Vortis	NHK Spring Mitsuzawa Football Stadium	3,993
12	2018.05.03	Kamatamare Sanuki	1–2	Yokohama FC	Pikara Stadium	4,295
13	2018.05.06	FC Machida Zelvia	1–0	Yokohama FC	Machida Stadium	6,015
14	2018.05.12	Yokohama FC	4–2	Roasso Kumamoto	NHK Spring Mitsuzawa Football Stadium	3,157
15	2018.05.20	Yokohama FC	3–3	JEF United Chiba	NHK Spring Mitsuzawa Football Stadium	6,772
16	2018.05.26	Kyoto Sanga FC	0–2	Yokohama FC	Kyoto Nishikyogoku Athletic Stadium	8,713
17	2018.06.03	Yokohama FC	2–2	Tokyo Verdy	NHK Spring Mitsuzawa Football Stadium	8,038
18	2018.06.10	Omiya Ardija	4–0	Yokohama FC	NACK5 Stadium Omiya	6,506
19	2018.06.17	Fagiano Okayama	0–0	Yokohama FC	City Light Stadium	9,776
20	2018.06.24	Yokohama FC	1–0	Ventforet Kofu	NHK Spring Mitsuzawa Football Stadium	9,079
21	2018.07.01	Renofa Yamaguchi FC	0–3	Yokohama FC	Ishin Me-Life Stadium	12,927
22	2018.07.07	Yokohama FC	1–1	Montedio Yamagata	NHK Spring Mitsuzawa Football Stadium	7,246
23	2018.07.15	Albirex Niigata	0–1	Yokohama FC	Denka Big Swan Stadium	16,813
24	2018.07.21	Yokohama FC	3–0	FC Gifu	NHK Spring Mitsuzawa Football Stadium	3,782
25	2018.07.25	Zweigen Kanazawa	0–0	Yokohama FC	Ishikawa Athletics Stadium	5,445
27	2018.08.04	Yokohama FC	2–3	FC Machida Zelvia	NHK Spring Mitsuzawa Football Stadium	3,873
28	2018.08.11	Roasso Kumamoto	3–5	Yokohama FC	Egao Kenko Stadium	5,423
29	2018.08.18	Yokohama FC	2–0	Kamatamare Sanuki	NHK Spring Mitsuzawa Football Stadium	5,002
30	2018.08.25	Matsumoto Yamaga FC	1–3	Yokohama FC	Matsumotodaira Park Stadium	13,905
31	2018.09.01	Yokohama FC	3–1	Kyoto Sanga FC	NHK Spring Mitsuzawa Football Stadium	3,519
32	2018.09.08	Tokyo Verdy	2–1	Yokohama FC	Ajinomoto Stadium	7,013
26	2018.09.12	Avispa Fukuoka	0–0	Yokohama FC	Level5 Stadium	7,307
33	2018.09.16	Yokohama FC	1–2	Mito HollyHock	NHK Spring Mitsuzawa Football Stadium	7,976
34	2018.09.23	JEF United Chiba	0–1	Yokohama FC	Fukuda Denshi Arena	10,233
35	2018.09.30	Yokohama FC	2–3	Renofa Yamaguchi FC	NHK Spring Mitsuzawa Football Stadium	3,051
36	2018.10.07	Tochigi SC	0–0	Yokohama FC	Tochigi Green Stadium	5,683
37	2018.10.13	Ehime FC	0–2	Yokohama FC	Ningineer Stadium	4,076
38	2018.10.21	Yokohama FC	1–1	Omiya Ardija	NHK Spring Mitsuzawa Football Stadium	9,680
39	2018.10.28	Tokushima Vortis	0–1	Yokohama FC	Pocarisweat Stadium	5,848
40	2018.11.04	Yokohama FC	3–1	Oita Trinita	NHK Spring Mitsuzawa Football Stadium	8,222
41	2018.11.10	Yokohama FC	2–1	Fagiano Okayama	NHK Spring Mitsuzawa Football Stadium	10,978
42	2018.11.17	Ventforet Kofu	0–1	Yokohama FC	Yamanashi Chuo Bank Stadium	9,821
