= 2016 Yokohama FC season =

Yokohama FC
2016 season
- Manager: Miloš Rus; Hitoshi Nakata
- Stadium: NHK Spring Mitsuzawa Football Stadium
- J2 League: 8th
Home colours	Away colours

2016 Yokohama FC season.

== Squad ==
As of 19 February 2016.

Note: Flags indicate national team as defined under FIFA eligibility rules; some limited exceptions apply. Players may hold more than one non-FIFA nationality.

No.	Pos.	Nation	Player
1	GK	JPN	Tsubasa Shibuya
2	DF	JPN	Yuki Nogami
3	DF	JPN	Ryo Tadokoro
4	DF	SVN	Denis Halilović
5	DF	JPN	Shogo Nishikawa
6	MF	JPN	Takahiro Nakazato
7	MF	JPN	Tomoya Uchida
8	MF	JPN	Kensuke Sato
9	FW	JPN	Tomohiro Tsuda
10	MF	JPN	Shinichi Terada
11	FW	JPN	Kazuyoshi Miura
13	MF	JPN	Yosuke Nozaki
14	FW	NOR	Ibba Laajab
15	DF	JPN	Atsushi Ichimura
16	MF	JPN	Naoki Nomura
17	MF	PRK	An Yong-hak

No.	Pos.	Nation	Player
18	GK	JPN	Yuta Minami
19	MF	JPN	Kosuke Onose
20	MF	SVN	Rok Štraus
21	MF	JPN	Leo Osaki
22	DF	JPN	Takuya Nagata
23	DF	KOR	Na Sung-soo
24	MF	JPN	Toshihiro Matsushita
25	MF	JPN	Keita Ishii
26	GK	JPN	Yohei Takaoka
27	DF	JPN	Shuma Kusumoto
28	MF	JPN	Yuta Fujii
29	MF	JPN	Yuki Ueda
30	FW	JPN	Kousuke Saito
31	MF	JPN	Youta Maejima
32	MF	VIE	Nguyễn Tuấn Anh (on loan from Hoàng Anh Gia Lai)
39	FW	JPN	Tetsuya Okubo

== J2 League ==
=== League table ===
Pos	Team	Pld	W	D	L	GF	GA	GD	Pts
7	Machida Zelvia	42	18	11	13	53	44	+9	65
8	Yokohama FC	42	16	11	15	50	51	−1	59
9	Tokushima Vortis	42	16	9	17	46	42	+4	57

Updated to match(es) played on 20 November 2016. Source: 2016 MEIJI YASUDA J2 LEAGUE League table
Rules for classification: 1) Points; 2) Goal difference; 3) Goals scored

=== Match details ===
J2 League match details
Match	Date	Team	Score	Team	Venue	Attendance
1	2016.02.28	Yokohama FC	0-1	Kamatamare Sanuki	NHK Spring Mitsuzawa Football Stadium	9,929
2	2016.03.06	Yokohama FC	0-2	Matsumoto Yamaga FC	NHK Spring Mitsuzawa Football Stadium	4,669
3	2016.03.13	JEF United Chiba	1-0	Yokohama FC	Fukuda Denshi Arena	9,419
4	2016.03.20	Yokohama FC	2-0	Renofa Yamaguchi FC	NHK Spring Mitsuzawa Football Stadium	3,122
5	2016.03.26	Yokohama FC	0-0	Ehime FC	NHK Spring Mitsuzawa Football Stadium	2,523
6	2016.04.03	Zweigen Kanazawa	1-2	Yokohama FC	Ishikawa Athletics Stadium	5,018
7	2016.04.09	Giravanz Kitakyushu	0-4	Yokohama FC	Honjo Stadium	3,569
8	2016.04.17	Yokohama FC	1-1	Tokyo Verdy	NHK Spring Mitsuzawa Football Stadium	3,238
10	2016.04.29	V-Varen Nagasaki	1-3	Yokohama FC	Nagasaki Stadium	5,254
11	2016.05.03	Yokohama FC	0-2	Fagiano Okayama	Nissan Stadium	5,561
12	2016.05.07	Tokushima Vortis	0-3	Yokohama FC	Pocarisweat Stadium	4,313
13	2016.05.15	Thespakusatsu Gunma	3-1	Yokohama FC	Shoda Shoyu Stadium Gunma	8,369
14	2016.05.22	Yokohama FC	1-1	Cerezo Osaka	NHK Spring Mitsuzawa Football Stadium	10,524
15	2016.05.28	Kyoto Sanga FC	1-0	Yokohama FC	Kyoto Nishikyogoku Athletic Stadium	9,903
16	2016.06.04	Montedio Yamagata	0-0	Yokohama FC	ND Soft Stadium Yamagata	6,659
17	2016.06.08	Yokohama FC	1-1	Mito HollyHock	NHK Spring Mitsuzawa Football Stadium	2,077
18	2016.06.12	Shimizu S-Pulse	3-0	Yokohama FC	IAI Stadium Nihondaira	11,647
19	2016.06.19	Yokohama FC	1-2	FC Gifu	NHK Spring Mitsuzawa Football Stadium	3,017
20	2016.06.26	Yokohama FC	1-0	FC Machida Zelvia	NHK Spring Mitsuzawa Football Stadium	6,871
21	2016.07.03	Hokkaido Consadole Sapporo	5-2	Yokohama FC	Chiyogadai Park Athletic Studium	10,442
22	2016.07.10	Yokohama FC	0-2	Tokushima Vortis	NHK Spring Mitsuzawa Football Stadium	3,034
23	2016.07.16	Yokohama FC	1-1	Roasso Kumamoto	NHK Spring Mitsuzawa Football Stadium	3,296
24	2016.07.20	Fagiano Okayama	0-1	Yokohama FC	City Light Stadium	10,753
25	2016.07.24	Yokohama FC	2-2	Giravanz Kitakyushu	NHK Spring Mitsuzawa Football Stadium	2,644
26	2016.07.31	Yokohama FC	2-1	JEF United Chiba	NHK Spring Mitsuzawa Football Stadium	7,396
27	2016.08.07	Cerezo Osaka	2-3	Yokohama FC	Kincho Stadium	13,246
28	2016.08.11	Yokohama FC	1-0	Hokkaido Consadole Sapporo	NHK Spring Mitsuzawa Football Stadium	6,843
29	2016.08.14	Tokyo Verdy	0-2	Yokohama FC	Ajinomoto Stadium	7,235
30	2016.08.21	Yokohama FC	0-2	Shimizu S-Pulse	NHK Spring Mitsuzawa Football Stadium	6,302
9	2016.09.07	Roasso Kumamoto	0-1	Yokohama FC	Umakana-Yokana Stadium	3,108
31	2016.09.11	FC Machida Zelvia	1-1	Yokohama FC	Machida Stadium	5,101
32	2016.09.18	Yokohama FC	2-0	Kyoto Sanga FC	NHK Spring Mitsuzawa Football Stadium	4,040
33	2016.09.25	Kamatamare Sanuki	1-0	Yokohama FC	Pikara Stadium	3,241
34	2016.10.02	Ehime FC	3-0	Yokohama FC	Ningineer Stadium	8,215
35	2016.10.08	Yokohama FC	2-2	V-Varen Nagasaki	NHK Spring Mitsuzawa Football Stadium	2,465
36	2016.10.16	Mito HollyHock	1-1	Yokohama FC	K's denki Stadium Mito	5,517
37	2016.10.23	Yokohama FC	3-2	Thespakusatsu Gunma	NHK Spring Mitsuzawa Football Stadium	4,751
38	2016.10.30	Renofa Yamaguchi FC	0-2	Yokohama FC	Ishin Memorial Park Stadium	13,311
39	2016.11.03	Yokohama FC	2-1	Montedio Yamagata	NHK Spring Mitsuzawa Football Stadium	6,912
40	2016.11.06	FC Gifu	2-0	Yokohama FC	Gifu Nagaragawa Stadium	9,060
41	2016.11.12	Yokohama FC	0-0	Zweigen Kanazawa	NHK Spring Mitsuzawa Football Stadium	3,510
42	2016.11.20	Matsumoto Yamaga FC	3-2	Yokohama FC	Matsumotodaira Park Stadium	19,632
