= Kazuyoshi Miura =

Japanese footballer (born 1967)

Kazuyoshi Miura 三浦 知良
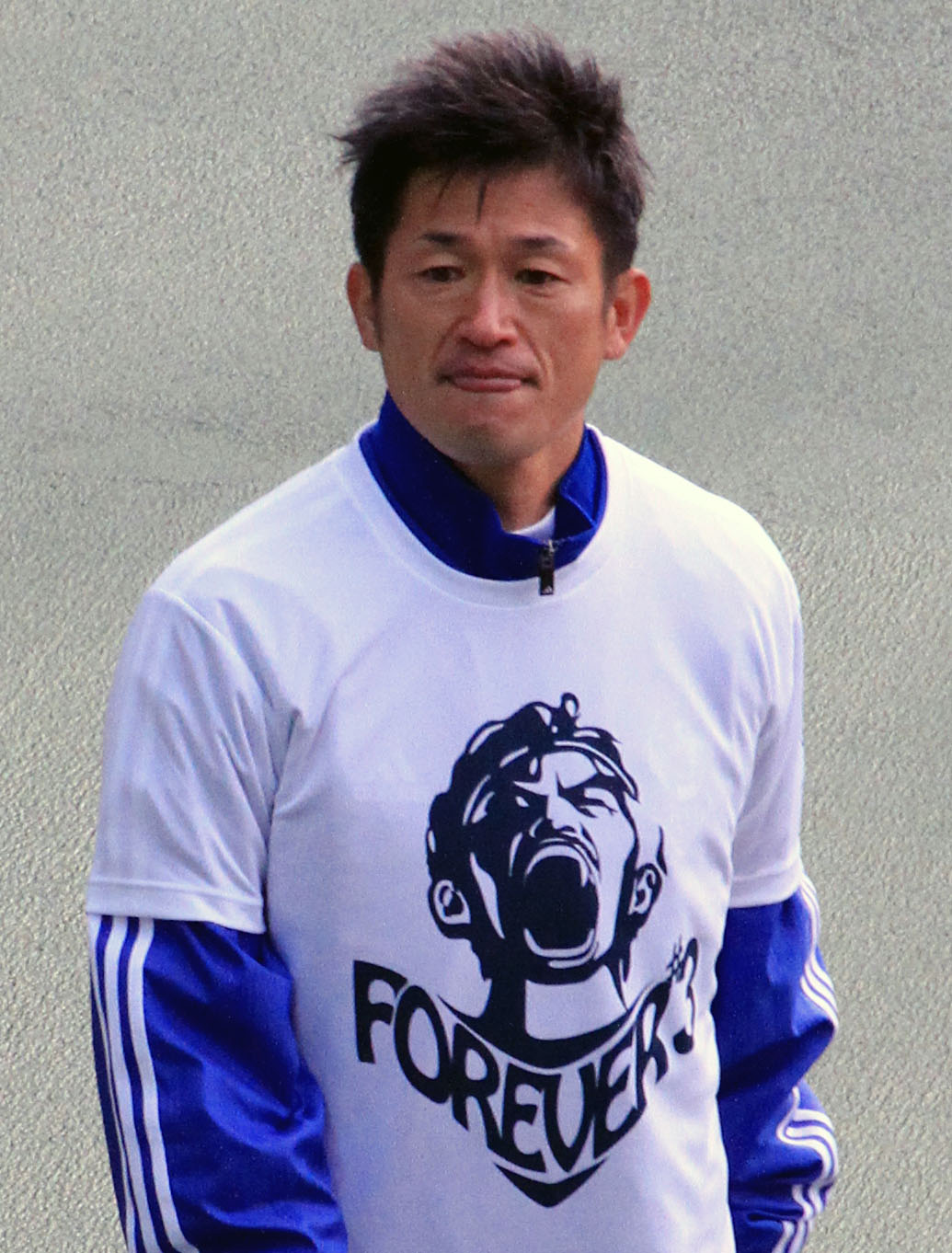
- Miura in 2012

Personal information
- Date of birth: 26 February 1967 (age 59)
- Place of birth: Shizuoka, Japan
- Height: 1.77 m (5 ft 10 in)
- Position: Forward

Team information
- Current team: Fukushima United (on loan from Yokohama FC)
- Number: 11

Youth career
- 1982: Shizuoka Gakuen High School
- 1982–1986: Juventus-SP

Senior career*
Years	Team	Apps	(Gls)
1986	Santos	2	(0)
1986	Palmeiras	25	(2)
1986	Matsubara	5	(1)
1987	CRB	4	(0)
1987–1988	XV de Jaú	25	(2)
1988–1989	Coritiba	21	(2)
1989–1990	Santos	11	(3)
1990–1998	Verdy Kawasaki (Note: Yomiuri Football Club changed its name to Verdy Kawasaki in 1992.)	192	(100)
1994–1995	→ Genoa (loan)	21	(1)
1999	Dinamo Zagreb	12	(0)
1999–2000	Kyoto Purple Sanga	41	(21)
2001–2005	Vissel Kobe	103	(24)
2005–	Yokohama FC	278	(27)
2005	→ Sydney FC (loan)	4	(2)
2022	→ Suzuka Point Getters (loan)	18	(2)
2023–2024	→ Oliveirense (loan)	8	(0)
2024–2025	→ Atletico Suzuka (loan)	18	(0)
2026–	→ Fukushima United (loan)	7	(0)

International career
1990–2000	Japan	89	(55)
2012	Japan (futsal)	6	(1)
Medal record
Men's football
Representing Japan
AFC Asian Cup
Winner	1992 Japan
Afro-Asian Cup of Nations
Winner	1993 Japan
- * Club domestic league appearances and goals as of 14:57, 19 August 2026 (UTC)

Kazuyoshi "Kazu" Miura (三浦 知良, Miura Kazuyoshi; born 26 February 1967), nicknamed King Kazu, is a Japanese professional footballer who plays as a forward for J3 League club Fukushima United, on loan from J2 League club Yokohama FC. He is the world's oldest professional player. In addition, he is one of the few players to have made over 1,050 official appearances and the first Japanese player to achieve the feat.

He played for the Japan national team from 1990 to 2000, and was the first Japanese recipient of the IFFHS Asia's Footballer of the Year award. With 55 goals in 89 caps for the national team, Miura is the second most prolific goalscorer in the national team's history, behind Kunishige Kamamoto.

Miura holds the records for being the oldest goalscorer in J-League history at 50, the footballer with the world's longest professional career, and, as of 2026, is the oldest professional footballer in the world at 59. He also holds the distinction of having played professional football in five separate decades (1980s–2020s). His elder brother Yasutoshi is a former professional footballer.

== Club career ==
=== Early career ===
In 1982, Miura left the Shizuoka Gakuen High School after less than a year, and travelled alone to Brazil at the age of fifteen to become a professional footballer there. He signed with the youth squad of São Paulo side Juventus, and in 1986, Miura signed his first professional contract with Santos. He played for several other Brazilian clubs, including Palmeiras and Coritiba, until his return to Japan in 1990.

=== Verdy Kawasaki ===
His time in Brazil elevated him to star status and on his return to Japan, he joined the Japan Soccer League (JSL) side Yomiuri SC, which later spun off from its parent company Yomiuri Shimbun and became Verdy Kawasaki with the launch of the J1 League in 1993. With Yomiuri/Kawasaki, Miura won four consecutive league titles playing alongside fellow Japanese national team regulars Ruy Ramos and Tsuyoshi Kitazawa. Yomiuri won the last two JSL titles in 1991 and 1992, and Verdy Kawasaki won the first two J1 League titles in 1993 and 1994. He was named the first J.League Most Valuable Player in 1993.

==== Loan to Genoa ====
Miura became the first East Asian footballer to play in Serie A, joining the Italian club Genoa in the 1994–95 Serie A season. In his Italian stint, he made 21 appearances for the club and scored one goal, during the Genoa derby against Sampdoria. On 15 January 1995, Miura assisted Antonio Manicone's match-winning goal against Padova.

==== Return to Verdy Kawasaki ====
He returned to Verdy Kawasaki for the 1995 season and played with them until the end of the 1998 season.

=== Dinamo Zagreb ===
Miura made another attempt at playing in Europe with Croatia Zagreb in 1999.

=== Return to Japan ===
He returned to Japan, however, following a brief trial with AFC Bournemouth, in the same year, and played with Kyoto Purple Sanga and Vissel Kobe.

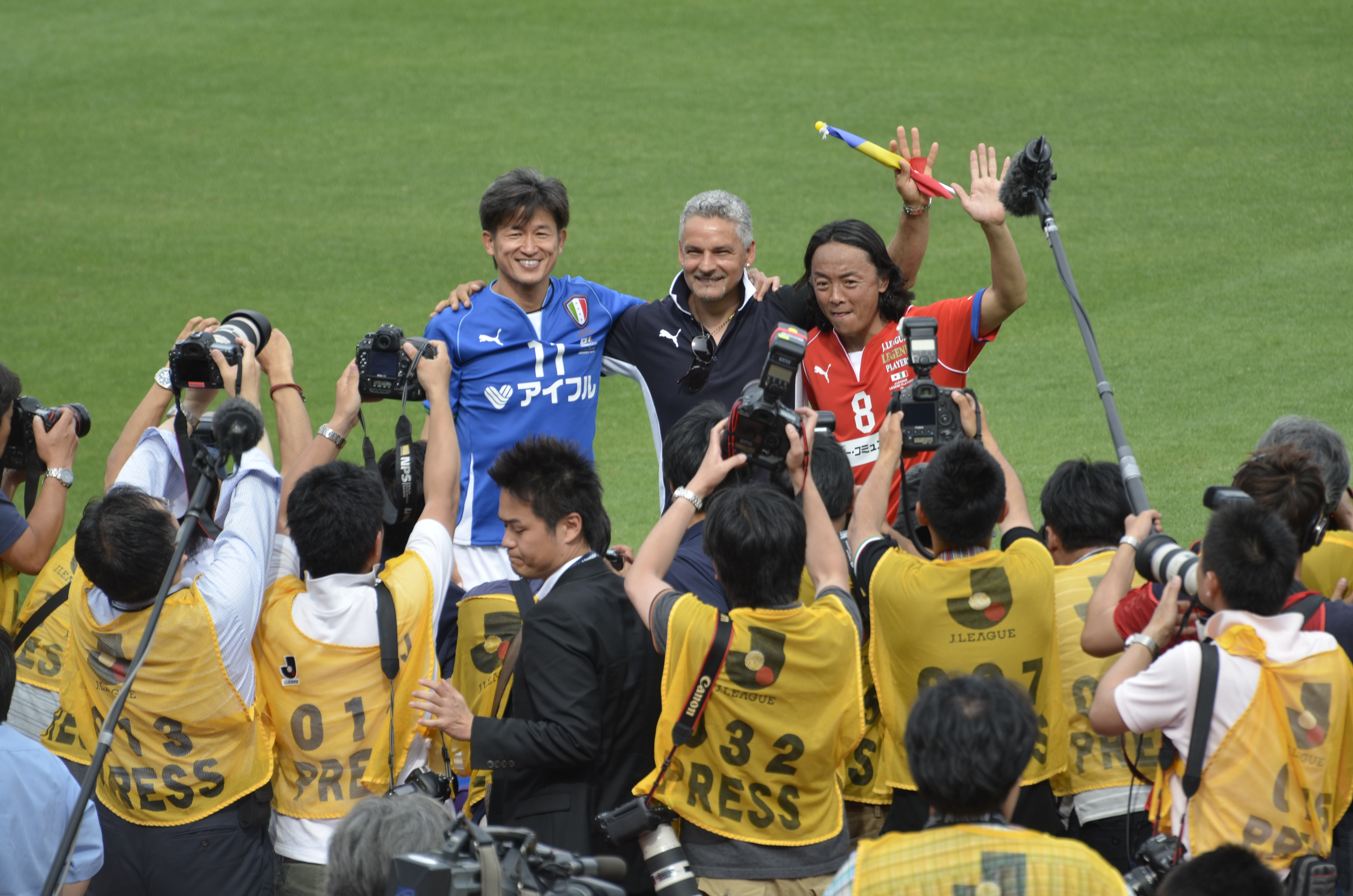
Miura (left) with Roberto Baggio and Tsuyoshi Kitazawa in 2013

=== Yokohama FC ===
In 2005, Miura signed for Yokohama FC. They would be promoted to the J1 League two years later. In 2007, Miura was selected for the 2007 J.League All-Star Soccer for J-East and played exceptionally well. In November 2015, Miura signed a new one-year contract with Yokohama FC at the age of 48. In January 2017, Miura signed another new one-year contract with Yokohama, taking his professional career into his fifties. On 5 March 2017, Miura became the oldest ever player to feature in a professional match when he started in Yokohama's 1–1 draw against V-Varen Nagasaki. With 50 years and seven days, he surpassed the previous record held by Stanley Matthews from 1965 by two days. Seven days later, he broke Matthews' record for oldest goalscorer in professional football when he struck the only goal of a 1–0 win over Thespakusatsu Gunma. In January 2018, he signed a new contract, and renewed it again in January 2019, January 2020, and January 2021. On 5 August 2020, he started in a J.League Cup match against Sagan Tosu, becoming the oldest player to take to the pitch in Japan's league cup competition, at the age of 53 years, 5 months and 10 days. By doing so, he surpassed the previous record of 42 years, 10 months set in 2017 by Yukio Tsuchiya.

On 23 September 2020, he started in the J1 League match against Kawasaki Frontale and in doing so became the oldest player to take to the pitch in a J1 League match and the oldest player ever in a football match in the highest national division worldwide. Miura played 57 minutes in this match.

In January 2021 he agreed to extend his contract at the age of 53 for his 36th season.

==== Loan to Suzuka Point Getters ====
On 30 December 2021, it was reported that Miura had reached an agreement to join the Suzuka Point Getters in the Japan Football League (JFL), the fourth tier of Japanese football. On 13 March 2022, Miura, at the age of 55, made his debut for the Point Getters in the first round of the Japan Football League with 4,620 spectators watching his debut, which is the highest attendance at a Suzuka home match, breaking their previous record of 1,308 spectators in 2019. His debut also meant that he broke the record of the oldest player to have ever featured in a JFL match at 55 years old, with a 12-year gap to the previous record holder. His presence at the club brought many curious spectators to see him in action, leading to the Point Getters having featured in nine of the ten matches with the highest attendance numbers throughout the 2022 season. This includes a 1–0 win against Criacao Shinjuku on 9 October 2022, which gathered a crowd of 16,218 spectators at the Japan National Stadium, becoming the highest-attended JFL match of all time. On 30 October 2022, Miura became the oldest player to score in the JFL, having converted from the penalty spot in the 85th minute of the match to seal Suzuka's 3–1 win against Tiamo Hirakata. He scored again from open play on 12 November 2022 at 55 years and 259 days old, breaking two more records. In total, from 30 October to 12 November, he played three matches and scored two goals.

==== Loan to Oliveirense ====
On 26 January 2023, Portuguese club Oliveirense announced that Miura would be playing for the Liga Portugal 2 club on loan for the rest of the season. Back in November 2022, the owner of Yokohama, Onodera Group, had become a majority shareholder (ownership of 52.5% of the stock) of U.D. Oliveirense. Oliveirense announced that Miura passed the medical tests with flying colors, and launched an official presentation video of him featuring typical Japanese manga aesthetics and style.

At 55 years old, Miura became by a large margin the oldest professional player to ever sign a professional contract for any professional ball sports team in Portugal since volleyball player Miguel Maia renewed his contract with Sporting Clube de Portugal in 2018 at 47 years of age. On 25 March, Miura played his first match for Oliveirense in a friendly match against Liga 3 team Oliveira do Hospital. Two days later he visited the Embassy of Japan in Lisbon where he gifted a signed football shirt of his team to the embassy staff.

On 22 April, Miura made his debut in a Liga Portugal 2 match at the age of 56, when he came on in the 90th minute of a 4–1 win at Academico de Viseu's home ground. On 28 May, Miura was awarded the man of the match in the last league game of the season for his team, where Miura played the last 20 minutes of the match as a substitute and Oliveirense won 4–3 against Leixões. Tonel, football commentator of Sport TV, chose Miura for the award as a symbolic homage to his long career, a decision which caused some controversy. Vítor Martins, Leixões' manager, found it strange and said: "In a game that had seven goals I do not understand how they give the Man of the Match award to Miura. I think it is offensive to give him the award, this is not the way, otherwise this is turned into a circus".

In July 2023, his loan with Oliveirense was extended for an indefinite period.

==== Loan to Atletico Suzuka ====
In June 2024, Miura returned on loan to Suzuka Point Getters, which had been rebranded to Atletico Suzuka.

On 29 September 2024, Miura broke the record for the oldest player to appear in JFL, at 57 years and 216 days old. He made his first start for the club, his tenth league appearance, in the 0–0 draw with Sony Sendai FC on 26 October, being substituted in the 55th minute.

==== Loan to Fukushima United ====
On 30 December 2025, Fukushima United announced that Miura would join the club on 10 January 2026. On 25 July 2026, he scored his first goal in four years in a 7–0 win against Iwaki Furukawa in the Japanese Emperor's Cup, aged 59 ‌years and 149 days. On 19 August of the same year/season, he scored two goals in a 7–0 win against Oyama SC, becoming the oldest scorer in Emperor's Cup history.

== International career ==
=== Football ===
In September 1990, Miura was named as part of the Japan squad for the 1990 Asian Games. At this competition, on 26 September, he debuted against Bangladesh. After his debut, he played as a forward until 1997. In 1992, he played at the 1992 Asian Cup, in which he scored the winner in a group stage 1–0 win against Iran. Japan went on to win the tournament, Miura being named the tournament's Most Valuable Player. In 1993, in the 1994 World Cup qualification, he played thirteen games and scored thirteen goals. However, Japan failed to qualify for the 1994 World Cup. He also played at the 1994 Asian Games, and the 1995 King Fahd Cup.Miura also played in the 1996 Asian Cup, and he scored one goal, the second goal in a group stage 4–0 win against Uzbekistan.

In 1997, Miura scored fourteen times for Japan during qualification for the 1998 World Cup, leading the Samurai Blue to their first ever World Cup appearance. Despite this, Miura was controversially left out of the squad by coach Takeshi Okada.

In February 2000, Miura played for Japan for the first time in two years. He played his last national team match later that year and finished with the second-most career goals in Japanese national team history with 55 goals in 89 matches.

He is one of only three men for Japan to score more than 50 goals for the teams, along with Kunishige Kamamoto and Shinji Okazaki.

=== Futsal ===
In 2012, and at the age of 45, Miura made his debut for the Japan futsal team in a 3–3 draw against Brazil. He came off the bench and was involved in the buildup for the second goal scored by Nobuya Osodo. In his second appearance with the futsal team, he scored the third goal in a 3–1 win over Ukraine. In the 2012 Futsal World Cup, Miura appeared in all four matches for Japan, but failed to score as the Japanese were knocked out by Ukraine in the round of 16.

== Personal life ==
Since 1993, he has been married to former actress and model Risako Shitara. They have two children, Ryota Miura (born 1997) and Kota Miura.

== Career statistics ==
=== Club ===
As of match played 19 August 2026

Appearances and goals by club, season and competition
Club	Season	League			National cup		League cup		Other (Note: Includes other competitive competitions, including the J.League Championship, Japanese Super Cup, Xerox Champions Cup, Serie A Play-off, Konica Cup, Sanwa Bank Cup and FIFA Club World Cup)		Total	
Club	Season	Division	Apps	Goals	Apps	Goals	Apps	Goals	Apps	Goals	Apps	Goals
Santos FC	1986	Série A	2	0	0	0	0	0	0	0	2	0
Palmeiras	1986	Série A	20	1	0	0	0	0	5	1	25	2
Matsubara	1986	Série A	5	1	0	0	0	0	0	0	5	1
CRB	1987	Série A	4	0	0	0	0	0	0	0	4	0
XV de Jau	1988	Série C	12	0	0	0	0	0	13	2	25	2
Coritiba	1988	Série A	10	0	0	0	0	0	11	2	21	2
Santos FC	1989	Série A	0	0	0	0	0	0	11	3	11	3
Yomiuri	1990–91	Japan Soccer League	18	3			1	0	7	3	26	6
Yomiuri	1991–92	Japan Soccer League	21	6			5	2	4	1	30	9
Yomiuri	Total		39	9			6	2	11	4	56	15
Verdy Kawasaki	1992	J.League	—		2	1	10	10	2	1	14	12
Verdy Kawasaki	1993	J.League	36	20	3	3	1	0	2	2	42	25
Verdy Kawasaki	1994	J.League	22	16	0	0	0	0	2	0	24	16
Verdy Kawasaki	Total		58	36	5	4	11	10	6	3	80	53
Genoa	1994–95	Serie A	21	1	—		1	0	1	0	23	1
Verdy Kawasaki	1995	J.League	26	23	2	0	—		2	0	30	23
Verdy Kawasaki	1996	J.League	27	23	5	4	6	2	1	1	39	30
Verdy Kawasaki	1997	J.League	14	4	2	1	0	0	1	0	17	5
Verdy Kawasaki	1998	J.League	28	5	3	2	0	0	—		31	7
Verdy Kawasaki	Total		95	55	12	7	6	2	4	1	117	65
Dinamo Zagreb	1998–99	Croatian First League	12	0	—		—		—		12	0
Kyoto Purple Sanga	1999	J1 League	11	4	2	1	0	0	—		13	5
Kyoto Purple Sanga	2000	J1 League	30	17	1	0	7	2	—		38	19
Kyoto Purple Sanga	Total		41	21	3	1	7	2	0	0	51	24
Vissel Kobe	2001	J1 League	29	11	2	0	3	2	—		34	13
Vissel Kobe	2002	J1 League	17	3	0	0	1	0	—		18	3
Vissel Kobe	2003	J1 League	24	4	3	2	4	0	—		31	6
Vissel Kobe	2004	J1 League	21	4	0	0	5	0	—		26	4
Vissel Kobe	2005	J1 League	12	2	0	0	6	1	—		18	3
Vissel Kobe	Total		103	24	5	2	19	3	0	0	127	29
Yokohama FC	2005	J2 League	16	4	1	0	—		—		17	4
Yokohama FC	2006	J2 League	39	6	0	0	—		—		39	6
Yokohama FC	2007	J1 League	24	3	2	0	4	0	—		30	3
Yokohama FC	2008	J2 League	30	1	2	0	—		—		32	1
Yokohama FC	2009	J2 League	30	1	0	0	—		—		30	1
Yokohama FC	2010	J2 League	10	3	0	0	—		—		10	3
Yokohama FC	2011	J2 League	30	0	1	0	—		—		31	0
Yokohama FC	2012	J2 League	14	1	0	0	—		—		14	1
Yokohama FC	2013	J2 League	18	2	0	0	—		—		18	2
Yokohama FC	2014	J2 League	2	0	0	0	—		—		2	0
Yokohama FC	2015	J2 League	16	3	0	0	—		—		16	3
Yokohama FC	2016	J2 League	20	2	0	0	—		—		20	2
Yokohama FC	2017	J2 League	12	1	0	0	—		—		12	1
Yokohama FC	2018	J2 League	9	0	0	0	—		—		9	0
Yokohama FC	2019	J2 League	3	0	0	0	—		—		3	0
Yokohama FC	2020	J1 League	4	0	0	0	2	0	—		6	0
Yokohama FC	2021	J1 League	1	0	0	0	3	0	—		4	0
Yokohama FC	Total		278	27	6	0	9	0	0	0	293	27
Sydney FC (loan)	2005–06	A-League	4	2	—		—		2	0	6	2
Suzuka Point Getters (loan)	2022	Japan Football League	18	2	0	0	—		—		18	2
Oliveirense (loan)	2022–23	Liga Portugal 2	4	0	—		—		—		4	0
Oliveirense (loan)	2023–24	Liga Portugal 2	4	0	0	0	1	0	—		5	0
Oliveirense (loan)	Total		8	0	0	0	1	0	0	0	9	0
Atletico Suzuka (loan)	2024	Japan Football League	12	0	0	0	—		—		12	0
Atletico Suzuka (loan)	2025	Japan Football League	6	0	0	0	—		—		6	0
Atletico Suzuka (loan)	Total		18	0	0	0	—		—		18	0
Fukushima United (loan)	2026	J2/J3 League	6	0	0	0	0	0	—		6	0
Fukushima United (loan)	2026–27	J3 League	0	0	2	3	0	0	—		2	3
Fukushima United (loan)	Total		6	0	2	3	0	0	—		8	3
Career total			754	179	33	17	60	19	64	16	911	231

Total appearances including known games in Brazil: 1,046+ (as of 15 February 2024)

=== International ===
Appearances and goals by national team and year
National team	Year	Apps	Goals
Japan	1990	3	0
Japan	1991	2	0
Japan	1992	11	2
Japan	1993	16	16
Japan	1994	8	5
Japan	1995	12	6
Japan	1996	12	6
Japan	1997	19	18
Japan	1998	1	0
Japan	1999	0	0
Japan	2000	5	2
Japan	Total	89	55
Japan (futsal)	2012	6	1
Career total		95	56

Scores and results list Japan's goal tally first, score column indicates score after each Miura goal.

List of international goals scored by Kazuyoshi Miura
No.	Date	Venue	Opponent	Score	Result	Competition
1	26 August 1992	Beijing, China	North Korea	4–1	4–1	1992 Dynasty Cup
2	3 November 1992	Hiroshima, Japan	Iran	1–0	1–0	1992 AFC Asian Cup
3	14 March 1993	Tokyo, Japan	United States	1–1	3–1	Friendly
4	14 March 1993	Tokyo, Japan	United States	3–1	3–1	Friendly
5	8 April 1993	Kobe, Japan	Thailand	1–0	1–0	1994 FIFA World Cup qualification
6	11 April 1993	Tokyo, Japan	Bangladesh	1–0	8–0	1994 FIFA World Cup qualification
7	11 April 1993	Tokyo, Japan	Bangladesh	3–0	8–0	1994 FIFA World Cup qualification
8	11 April 1993	Tokyo, Japan	Bangladesh	4–0	8–0	1994 FIFA World Cup qualification
9	11 April 1993	Tokyo, Japan	Bangladesh	5–0	8–0	1994 FIFA World Cup qualification
10	15 April 1993	Tokyo, Japan	Sri Lanka	3–0	5–0	1994 FIFA World Cup qualification
11	15 April 1993	Tokyo, Japan	Sri Lanka	5–0	5–0	1994 FIFA World Cup qualification
12	30 April 1993	Dubai, UAE	Bangladesh	2–1	4–1	1994 FIFA World Cup qualification
13	5 May 1993	Dubai, UAE	Sri Lanka	5–0	6–0	1994 FIFA World Cup qualification
14	4 October 1993	Tokyo, Japan	Ivory Coast	1–0	1–0	Afro-Asian Cup of Nations
15	21 October 1993	Doha, Qatar	North Korea	1–0	3–0	1994 FIFA World Cup qualification
16	21 October 1993	Doha, Qatar	North Korea	3–0	3–0	1994 FIFA World Cup qualification
17	25 October 1993	Doha, Qatar	South Korea	1–0	1–0	1994 FIFA World Cup qualification
18	28 October 1993	Doha, Qatar	Iraq	1–0	2–2	1994 FIFA World Cup qualification
19	8 July 1994	Nagoya, Japan	Ghana	1–1	3–2	Friendly
20	8 July 1994	Nagoya, Japan	Ghana	2–1	3–2	Friendly
21	14 July 1994	Kobe, Japan	Ghana	2–0	2–1	Friendly
22	3 October 1994	Hiroshima, Japan	United Arab Emirates	1–1	1–1	1994 Asian Games
23	11 October 1994	Hiroshima, Japan	South Korea	1–0	2–3	1994 Asian Games
24	8 January 1995	Riyadh, Saudi Arabia	Argentina	1–4	1–5	1995 King Fahd Cup
25	28 May 1995	Tokyo, Japan	Ecuador	2–0	3–0	Friendly
26	28 May 1995	Tokyo, Japan	Ecuador	3–0	3–0	Friendly
27	20 September 1995	Tokyo, Japan	Paraguay	1–0	1–2	Friendly
28	24 October 1995	Tokyo, Japan	Saudi Arabia	2–0	2–1	Friendly
29	28 October 1995	Matsuyama, Japan	Saudi Arabia	1–1	2–1	Friendly
30	19 February 1996	Hong Kong, China	Poland	4–0	5–0	1996 Lunar New Year Cup
31	26 May 1996	Tokyo, Japan	FR Yugoslavia	1–0	1–0	1996 Kirin Cup
32	29 May 1996	Fukuoka, Japan	Mexico	2–2	3–2	1996 Kirin Cup
33	25 August 1996	Osaka, Japan	Uruguay	2–1	5–3	Friendly
34	25 August 1996	Osaka, Japan	Uruguay	4–1	5–3	Friendly
35	9 December 1996	Al Ain, UAE	Uzbekistan	2–0	4–0	1996 AFC Asian Cup
36	15 March 1997	Bangkok, Thailand	Thailand	1–1	1–3	Friendly
37	25 March 1997	Muscat, Oman	Macau	4–0	10–0	1998 FIFA World Cup qualification
38	25 March 1997	Muscat, Oman	Macau	9–0	10–0	1998 FIFA World Cup qualification
39	21 May 1997	Tokyo, Japan	South Korea	1–1	1–1	Friendly
40	8 June 1997	Tokyo, Japan	Croatia	2–0	4–3	1997 Kirin Cup
41	8 June 1997	Tokyo, Japan	Croatia	3–0	4–3	1997 Kirin Cup
42	22 June 1997	Tokyo, Japan	Macau	3–0	10–0	1998 FIFA World Cup qualification
43	22 June 1997	Tokyo, Japan	Macau	4–0	10–0	1998 FIFA World Cup qualification
44	22 June 1997	Tokyo, Japan	Macau	6–0	10–0	1998 FIFA World Cup qualification
45	22 June 1997	Tokyo, Japan	Macau	7–0	10–0	1998 FIFA World Cup qualification
46	22 June 1997	Tokyo, Japan	Macau	9–0	10–0	1998 FIFA World Cup qualification
47	22 June 1997	Tokyo, Japan	Macau	10–0	10–0	1998 FIFA World Cup qualification
48	25 June 1997	Tokyo, Japan	Nepal	2–0	3–0	1998 FIFA World Cup qualification
49	25 June 1997	Tokyo, Japan	Nepal	3–0	3–0	1998 FIFA World Cup qualification
50	7 September 1997	Tokyo, Japan	Uzbekistan	1–0	6–3	1998 FIFA World Cup qualification
51	7 September 1997	Tokyo, Japan	Uzbekistan	2–0	6–3	1998 FIFA World Cup qualification
52	7 September 1997	Tokyo, Japan	Uzbekistan	5–1	6–3	1998 FIFA World Cup qualification
53	7 September 1997	Tokyo, Japan	Uzbekistan	6–3	6–3	1998 FIFA World Cup qualification
54	16 February 2000	Macau, China	Brunei	4–0	9–0	2000 AFC Asian Cup qualification
55	6 June 2000	Casablanca, Morocco	Jamaica	4–0	4–0	2000 King Hassan II International Cup Tournament

== Honours ==
Matsubara

- Torneio Brasil Sul: 1986 (in Portuguese)

CRB

- Campeonato Alagoano: 1987 (in Portuguese)

Coritiba

- Campeonato Paranaense: 1989 (in Portuguese)

Tokyo Verdy

- Japan Soccer League: 1990–91, 1991–92,
- J1 League: 1993, 1994
- Emperor's Cup: 1996
- J.League Cup: 1992, 1993, 1994
- Japan Soccer League Cup: 1991
- Japanese Super Cup: 1994, 1995

Dinamo Zagreb

- Prva HNL: 1998–99

Yokohama

- J2 League: 2006

Japan

- AFC Asian Cup: 1992
- Afro-Asian Cup of Nations: 1993
- Kirin Cup: 1991, 1995, 1996, 1997

Individual

- Asian Footballer of the Year: 1992
- J.League MVP Award: 1993
- J.League Best XI: 1993, 1995, 1996
- J.League 20th Anniversary Team: 2013
- J.League 30th Anniversary Team: 2023
- J.League Top Scorer: 1996
- AFC Asian Cup Most Valuable Player: 1992
- 1994 FIFA World Cup qualification Top scorer
- Kirin Cup top scorer: 1991, 1993, 1995, 1996, 1997 (joint)

== See also ==
- List of men's footballers with 50 or more international goals
- List of men's footballers with the most official appearances
- Robert Carmona
