= Takumi Abe =

Japanese footballer (born 1991)

Takumi Abe 阿部 巧
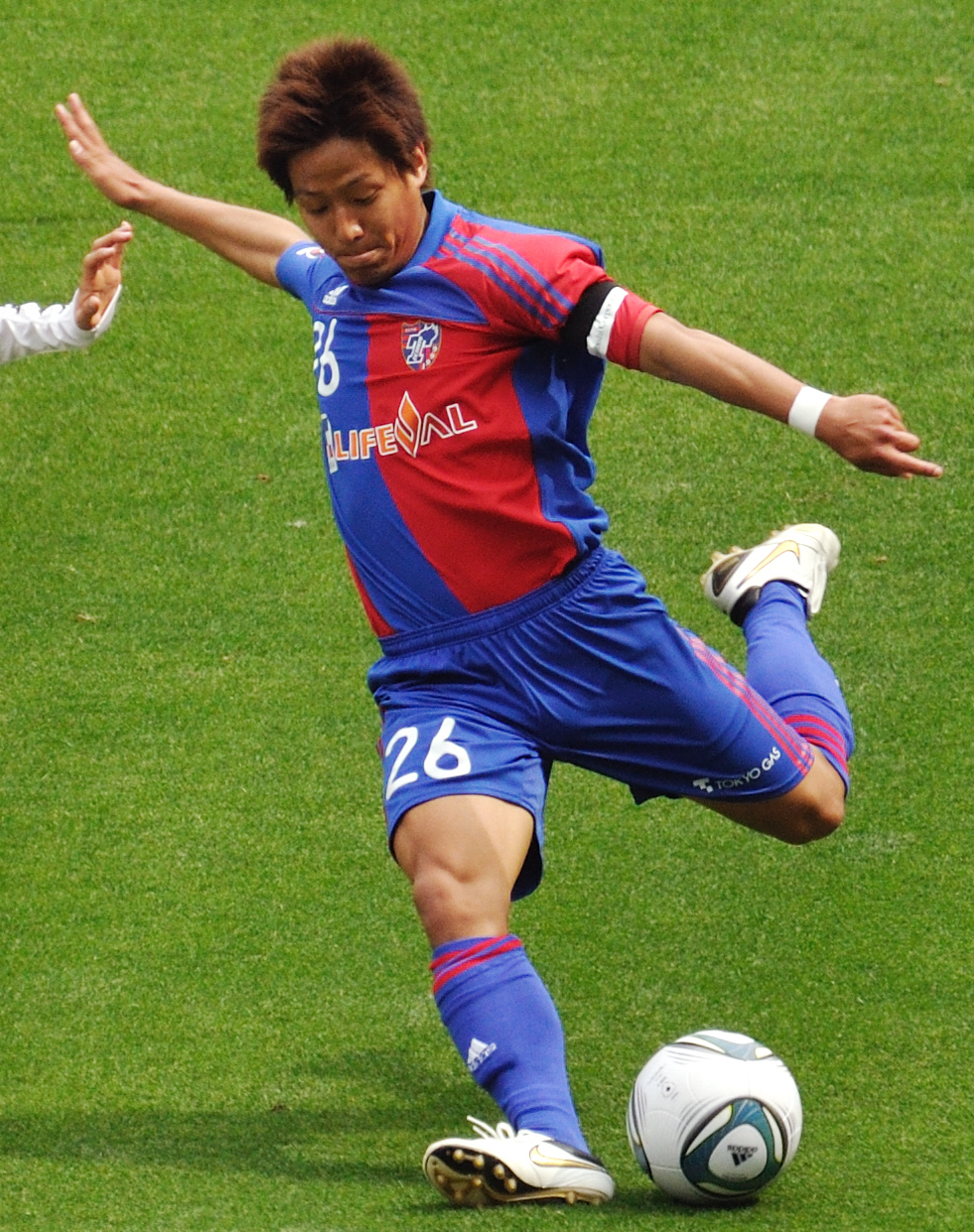

Personal information
- Full name: Takumi Abe
- Date of birth: May 26, 1991 (age 35)
- Place of birth: Ōta, Tokyo, Japan
- Height: 1.66 m (5 ft 5 1/2 in)
- Position: Defender

Team information
- Current team: Tochigi City FC
- Number: 26

Youth career
- 2004–2009: FC Tokyo Youth

Senior career*
Years	Team	Apps	(Gls)
2010–2013	FC Tokyo	8	(0)
2010	→ Yokohama FC (loan)	16	(1)
2012	→ Yokohama FC (loan)	39	(1)
2013	Matsumoto Yamaga	9	(0)
2014–2016	Avispa Fukuoka	57	(1)
2017–2018	Thespakusatsu Gunma	56	(1)
2019	SC Sagamihara	20	(0)
2020–	Tochigi City FC		
Medal record
FC Tokyo
Winner	Emperor's Cup	2011
- * Club domestic league appearances and goals as of 23 February 2018

Takumi Abe (阿部 巧, born May 26, 1991) is a Japanese football player for Thespakusatsu Gunma.

== Club statistics ==
Updated to 23 February 2018.

Club performance			League		Cup		League Cup		Total	
Season	Club	League	Apps	Goals	Apps	Goals	Apps	Goals	Apps	Goals
Japan			League		Emperor's Cup		J. League Cup		Total	
2010	FC Tokyo	J1 League	0	0	0	0	0	0	0	0
2010	Yokohama FC	J2 League	16	1	1	0	-		17	1
2011	FC Tokyo	J2 League	8	0	0	0	-		8	0
2012	Yokohama FC	J2 League	39	1	0	0	-		40	1
2013	Matsumoto Yamaga	J2 League	9	0	2	0	-		11	0
2014	Avispa Fukuoka	J2 League	34	0	1	0	-		35	0
2015	Avispa Fukuoka	J2 League	21	1	2	0	-		23	1
2016	Avispa Fukuoka	J1 League	1	0	2	0	3	0	6	0
2017	Thespakusatsu Gunma	J2 League	35	0	1	0	-		36	0
2018	Thespakusatsu Gunma	J3 League	21	1	2	0	-		23	1
2019	SC Sagamihara	J3 League	20	0	-		-		20	0
Total			204	4	11	0	3	0	218	4
