= Yuto Takeoka =

Japanese footballer

Yuto Takeoka 武岡 優斗
Personal information
- Full name: Yuto Takeoka
- Date of birth: June 24, 1986 (age 40)
- Place of birth: Kyoto, Japan
- Height: 1.78 m (5 ft 10 in)
- Positions: Midfielder; full-back

Youth career
- 2006–2008: Kokushikan University FC

Senior career*
Years	Team	Apps	(Gls)
2009	Sagan Tosu	40	(3)
2010–2013	Yokohama FC	95	(11)
2014–2018	Kawasaki Frontale	60	(1)
2019	Ventforet Kofu	25	
2020	Renofa Yamaguchi	19	(0)
Medal record
Kawasaki Frontale
Winner	J1 League	2017
Winner	J1 League	2018
Runner-up	J.League Cup	2017
Runner-up	Emperor's Cup	2016
- * Club domestic league appearances and goals as of 23:14, 6 March 2021 (UTC)

Yuto Takeoka (武岡 優斗, Takeoka Yūto; born June 24, 1986) is a Japanese football player.

== Club statistics ==
Updated to 23 February 2019.

Club performance			League		Cup		League Cup		Continental		Total	
Season	Club	League	Apps	Goals	Apps	Goals	Apps	Goals	Apps	Goals	Apps	Goals
Japan			League		Emperor's Cup		J. League Cup		Asia		Total	
2008	Kokushikan University FC	-	-		4	3	-		-		4	3
2009	Sagan Tosu	J2 League	40	3	2	0	-		-		42	3
2010	Yokohama FC	J2 League	21	0	2	0	-		-		23	0
2011	Yokohama FC	J2 League	0	0	0	0	-		-		0	0
2012	Yokohama FC	J2 League	34	7	1	0	-		-		35	7
2013	Yokohama FC	J2 League	40	4	0	0	-		-		40	4
2014	Kawasaki Frontale	J1 League	4	0	0	0	0	0	3	0	7	0
2015	Kawasaki Frontale	J1 League	30	1	3	0	6	0	-		39	1
2016	Kawasaki Frontale	J1 League	18	0	1	0	4	0	-		23	0
2017	Kawasaki Frontale	J1 League	3	0	0	0	0	0	1	0	4	0
2018	Kawasaki Frontale	J1 League	5	0	1	0	0	0	2	0	8	0
Total			195	15	14	3	10	0	6	0	225	18
