= Tsuyoshi Hakkaku =

Japanese footballer

Personal information
- Full name: Tsuyoshi Hakkaku
- Date of birth: 20 April 1985 (age 41)
- Place of birth: Ichikawa, Chiba, Japan
- Height: 1.74 m (5 ft 9 in)
- Position: Midfielder

Youth career
- 2004–2007: Komazawa University

Senior career*
Years	Team	Apps	(Gls)
2008–2012	Yokohama FC	123	(3)
2013–2017	Giravanz Kitakyushu	91	(1)
- * Club domestic league appearances and goals as of 2 February 2018

Tsuyoshi Hakkaku (八角 剛史, Hakkaku Tsuyoshi; born 20 April 1985 in Ichikawa, Chiba) is a former Japanese footballer who last played for Giravanz Kitakyushu.

== Club statistics ==
Updated to 2 February 2018.

Club performance			League		Cup		Total	
Season	Club	League	Apps	Goals	Apps	Goals	Apps	Goals
Japan			League		Emperor's Cup		Total	
2008	Yokohama FC	J2 League	20	0	2	1	22	1
2009	Yokohama FC	J2 League	40	3	2	0	42	3
2010	Yokohama FC	J2 League	24	0	2	0	26	0
2011	Yokohama FC	J2 League	10	0	0	0	10	0
2012	Yokohama FC	J2 League	29	0	1	0	30	0
2013	Giravanz Kitakyushu	J2 League	37	1	0	0	37	1
2014	Giravanz Kitakyushu	J2 League	36	0	4	0	40	0
2015	Giravanz Kitakyushu	J2 League	16	0	1	0	17	0
2016	Giravanz Kitakyushu	J2 League	2	0	0	0	2	0
2017	Giravanz Kitakyushu	J3 League	0	0	0	0	0	0
Total			214	4	12	1	226	5
