= Ayumu Tachibana =

Japanese footballer

Ayumu Tachibana 立花 歩夢
Personal information
- Full name: Ayumu Tachibana
- Date of birth: November 4, 1995 (age 30)
- Place of birth: Kanagawa, Japan
- Height: 1.72 m (5 ft 7 1/2 in)
- Position: Forward

Youth career
- 2014–2017: Ryutsu Keizai University

Senior career*
Years	Team	Apps	(Gls)
2018–2019	Yokohama FC	4	(0)
2019	→ Tombense (loan)	0	(0)
2020	Preston Lions		
2020	SC Sagamihara	6	(0)
2021	Gimpo FC	4	(0)
- * Club domestic league appearances and goals as of 16:40, 12 March 2022 (UTC)

Ayumu Tachibana (立花 歩夢, Tachibana Ayumu; born November 4, 1995) is a Japanese football player.

== Career ==
After attending Ryutsu Keizai University football club, Tachibana joined Yokohama FC in 2018. On 3 August 2019, he was loaned out to Brazilian club Tombense. However, he returned soon afterward on 16 August due to a knee injury. On 28 February 2020, Tachibana moved to Australian club Preston Lions FC. Among other things, he scored four goals in a game Heidelberg Eagles SC in the FFA Cup.

== Club statistics ==
Updated to 29 August 2018.

Club performance			League		Cup		Total	
Season	Club	League	Apps	Goals	Apps	Goals	Apps	Goals
Japan			League		Emperor's Cup		Total	
2017	Yokohama FC	J2 League	4	0	2	1	6	1
Total			4	0	2	1	6	1
