= Tsukasa Morimoto =

Japanese footballer

Personal information
- Full name: Tsukasa Morimoto
- Date of birth: June 24, 1988 (age 38)
- Place of birth: Nagoya, Japan
- Height: 1.77 m (5 ft 9 1/2 in)
- Position: Defender

Team information
- Current team: Nara Club
- Number: 39

Youth career
- 2001–2006: Nagoya Grampus Eight

College career
Years	Team	Apps	(Gls)
2007–2010	Chukyo University		

Senior career*
Years	Team	Apps	(Gls)
2010	Sagan Tosu	3	(0)
2011–2015	Yokohama FC	59	(4)
2014	→ SC Sagamihara (loan)	14	(0)
2016–	Nara Club	28	(0)
- * Club domestic league appearances and goals as of 20 February 2017

Tsukasa Morimoto (森本 良, Morimoto Tsukasa; born June 24, 1988) is a Japanese football player. He plays for Nara Club.

== Career statistics ==
Updated to 20 February 2017.

Appearances and goals by club, season and competition
Club	Season	League			Emperor's Cup		Total	
Club	Season	Division	Apps	Goals	Apps	Goals	Apps	Goals
Sagan Tosu	2010	J2 League	3	0	0	0	3	0
Yokohama FC	2011	J2 League	16	1	0	0	16	1
Yokohama FC	2012	J2 League	23	3	0	0	23	3
Yokohama FC	2013	J2 League	10	0	0	0	10	0
SC Sagamihara	2014	J3 League	14	0	–		14	0
Yokohama FC	2015	J2 League	10	0	2	0	12	0
Nara Club	2016	JFL	28	0	2	0	30	0
Career total			104	4	4	0	108	4
