= Keiji Takachi =

Japanese footballer

Keiji Takachi 髙地 系治
Personal information
- Full name: Keiji Takachi
- Date of birth: April 23, 1980 (age 46)
- Place of birth: Kawaguchi, Saitama, Japan
- Height: 1.73 m (5 ft 8 in)
- Positions: Midfielder; defender

Team information
- Current team: Tochigi City
- Number: 6

Youth career
- Omiya Higashi High School

Senior career*
Years	Team	Apps	(Gls)
2001	Tokyo Verdy	0	(0)
2001–2002	Okinawa Kariyushi		
2003–2004	FC Ryukyu		
2005–2009	Sagan Tosu	188	(24)
2010–2013	Yokohama FC	117	(19)
2014–2016	FC Gifu	109	(8)
2017	Tegevajaro Miyazaki	18	(3)
2018–	Tochigi City	33	(4)
Total		450	(58)
- * Club domestic league appearances and goals as of 1 January 2020

Keiji Takachi (髙地 系治, Takachi Keiji; born April 23, 1980) is a Japanese football player.

== Playing career ==
Takachi was born in Kawaguchi on April 23, 1980. After graduating from high school, through some Brazilian club, he joined J1 League club Tokyo Verdy in 2001. However he could not play at all in the match. In the middle of 2001, he moved to Prefectural Leagues club Okinawa Kariyushi FC. The club was promoted to Regional Leagues from 2002. In 2003, he moved to Prefectural Leagues club FC Ryukyu. In 2005, he moved to J2 League club Sagan Tosu. He became a regular player and played many matches as left side back from 2005. In 2007, he played many matches as defensive midfielder. Although he returned to left side back in 2008, he played many matches as defensive midfielder in 2009. In 2010, he moved to J2 club Yokohama FC. He became a regular player and played many matches as many defensive position. In 2014, he moved to J2 club FC Gifu. He played many matches until 2015. However his opportunity to play decreased in 2016. In 2017, he moved to Regional Leagues club Tegevajaro Miyazaki. In 2018, he moved to Regional Leagues club Tochigi Uva FC (later Tochigi City FC).

== Club statistics ==
As of January 1st, 2020.

Club performance			League		Cup		League Cup		Total	
Season	Club	League	Apps	Goals	Apps	Goals	Apps	Goals	Apps	Goals
Japan			League		Emperor's Cup		J.League Cup		Total	
2001	Tokyo Verdy	J1 League	0	0	0	0	0	0	0	0
2001	Okinawa Kariyushi FC	OPL (Div. 1)					-			
2002	Okinawa Kariyushi FC	JRL (Kyushu)					-			
2003	FC Ryukyu	OPL (Div. 3)					-			
2004	FC Ryukyu	OPL (Div. 1)					-			
2005	Sagan Tosu	J2 League	29	1	1	0	-		30	1
2006	Sagan Tosu	J2 League	38	4	1	0	-		39	4
2007	Sagan Tosu	J2 League	44	7	3	2	-		47	9
2008	Sagan Tosu	J2 League	36	4	4	0	-		40	4
2009	Sagan Tosu	J2 League	41	8	2	0	-		43	8
2010	Yokohama FC	J2 League	32	8	2	0	-		34	8
2011	Yokohama FC	J2 League	29	4	1	0	-		30	4
2012	Yokohama FC	J2 League	34	3	1	0	-		35	3
2013	Yokohama FC	J2 League	22	4	0	0	-		22	4
2014	FC Gifu	J2 League	40	7	1	0	-		41	7
2015	FC Gifu	J2 League	41	0	1	0	-		42	0
2016	FC Gifu	J2 League	28	1	1	0	-		29	1
2017	Tegevajaro Miyazaki	JRL (Kyushu)	18	3	-		-		18	3
2018	Tochigi Uva FC	JRL (Kantō, Div. 1)	18	4	-		-		18	4
2019	Tochigi City FC	JRL (Kantō, Div. 1)	15	0	1	0	-		16	0
Total			465	58	20	2	0	0	485	60
