= Akinori Ichikawa =

Japanese footballer

Akinori Ichikawa 市川 暉記
Personal information
- Date of birth: 19 October 1998 (age 28)
- Place of birth: Kanagawa, Japan
- Height: 1.90 m (6 ft 3 in)
- Position: Goalkeeper

Team information
- Current team: Yokohama FC
- Number: 21

Youth career
- 2005–2010: Nakai FC
- 2011–2013: Shonan Bellmare
- 2014–2016: Seisa Kokusai Shonan High School

Senior career*
| Years | Team | Apps | (Gls) |
| 2017– | Yokohama FC | 90 | (0) |
| 2019 | → Gainare Tottori (loan) | 10 | (0) |
| 2023 | → Gamba Osaka (loan) | 0 | (0) |
- * Club domestic league appearances and goals as of 14 August 2026

Akinori Ichikawa (市川 暉記, Ichikawa Akinori; born 19 October 1998) is a Japanese footballer who plays as a goalkeeper for J2 League club Yokohama FC.

== Club statistics ==
As of 7 June 2024.

Appearances and goals by club, season and competition
| Club | Season | League | | | National Cup | | League Cup | | Total | |
| Club | Season | Division | Apps | Goals | Apps | Goals | Apps | Goals | Apps | Goals |
| Japan | | | League | | Emperor's Cup | | J. League Cup | | Total | |
|---|---|---|---|---|---|---|---|---|---|---|
| Yokohama FC | 2017 | J2 League | 0 | 0 | 0 | 0 | – | | 0 | 0 |
| Yokohama FC | 2018 | J2 League | 0 | 0 | 0 | 0 | – | | 0 | 0 |
| Yokohama FC | 2020 | J1 League | 0 | 0 | 0 | 0 | 2 | 0 | 2 | 0 |
| Yokohama FC | 2021 | J1 League | 4 | 0 | 0 | 0 | 2 | 0 | 6 | 0 |
| Yokohama FC | 2022 | J2 League | 3 | 0 | 1 | 0 | – | | 4 | 0 |
| Yokohama FC | 2023 | J1 League | 4 | 0 | 2 | 0 | 2 | 0 | 8 | 0 |
| Yokohama FC | 2024 | J2 League | 18 | 0 | 0 | 0 | 0 | 0 | 18 | 0 |
| Yokohama FC | Total | | 29 | 0 | 3 | 0 | 6 | 0 | 38 | 0 |
| Gainare Tottori (loan) | 2019 | J3 League | 10 | 0 | 2 | 0 | – | | 12 | 0 |
| Gamba Osaka (loan) | 2023 | J1 League | 0 | 0 | 0 | 0 | 0 | 0 | 0 | 0 |
| Career total | | | 39 | 0 | 5 | 0 | 6 | 0 | 50 | 0 |
