= Kosuke Saito (footballer) =

Japanese footballer

Kosuke Saito 齋藤 功佑
Personal information
- Full name: Kosuke Saito
- Date of birth: June 16, 1997 (age 29)
- Place of birth: Yokohama, Kanagawa, Japan
- Height: 1.67 m (5 ft 5 1/2 in)
- Position: Forward

Team information
- Current team: Tokyo Verdy
- Number: 8

Youth career
- 2010–2015: Yokohama FC

Senior career*
Years	Team	Apps	(Gls)
2016–2023	Yokohama FC	95	(12)
2023–	Tokyo Verdy	128	(7)
- * Club domestic league appearances and goals as of 8 August 2026

Kosuke Saito (齋藤 功佑, Saitō Kōsuke; born June 16, 1997) is a Japanese football player who plays as a forward for Tokyo Verdy.

== Career ==
On 9 September 2015, Kosuke Saito was promoted to the first team of J2 League club Yokohama FC.

On 5 January 2023, Saito was announced at Tokyo Verdy.
