= Yuta Fujii =

Japanese footballer

Personal information
- Full name: Yuta Fujii
- Date of birth: May 25, 1991 (age 35)
- Place of birth: Saitama, Japan
- Height: 1.80 m (5 ft 11 in)
- Position: Centre-back

Team information
- Current team: Thespakusatsu Gunma
- Number: 5

Youth career
- 2007–2009: Bunan Senior High School
- 2010–2013: Toyo University

Senior career*
Years	Team	Apps	(Gls)
2014–2015	Omiya Ardija	1	(0)
2016–2019	Yokohama FC	68	(0)
2020	Avispa Fukuoka	9	(0)
2021–	Thespakusatsu Gunma	12	(0)
- * Club domestic league appearances and goals as of 19:55, 16 January 2022 (UTC)

Yuta Fujii (藤井 悠太, Fujii Yuta; born May 25, 1991 in Saitama) is a Japanese football player for Thespakusatsu Gunma.

== Career ==
Fujii joined Omiya Ardija in 2014. In 2016, he moved to Yokohama FC.

== Career statistics ==
Updated to 23 February 2017.

Appearances and goals by club, season and competition
Club	Season	League			Emperor's Cup		J.League Cup		Total	
Club	Season	Division	Apps	Goals	Apps	Goals	Apps	Goals	Apps	Goals
Omiya Ardija	2014	J1 League	0	0	2	0	0	0	2	0
Omiya Ardija	2015	J2 League	1	0	0	0	—		1	0
Yokohama FC	2016	J2 League	23	0	1	0	—		24	0
Career total			24	0	3	0	0	0	27	0
