= Keita Ishii =

Japanese footballer

Keita Ishii 石井 圭太
Personal information
- Full name: Keita Ishii
- Date of birth: June 22, 1995 (age 31)
- Place of birth: Kanagawa, Japan
- Height: 1.73 m (5 ft 8 in)
- Position: Midfielder

Team information
- Current team: Criacao Shinjuku (from 2023)

Youth career
- 2008–2013: Yokohama FC Youth

Senior career*
Years	Team	Apps	(Gls)
2014–2018	Yokohama FC	20	(0)
2014–2015	→ J. League U-22 (loan)	17	(1)
2016	→ Grulla Morioka (loan)	15	(2)
2019–2022	Iwate Grulla Morioka	78	(2)
2023–	Criacao Shinjuku	0	(0)
- * Club domestic league appearances and goals as of 23 October 2022, 18:46 (UTC)

Keita Ishii (石井 圭太, Ishii Keita; born June 22, 1995 in Kanagawa) is a Japanese football player who will play for Criacao Shinjuku from 2023.

== Career ==
On 8 January 2019, Ishii joined Iwate Grulla Morioka. He left the club on 2022, after a three-year stint at Morioka.

On 24 November 2022, Ishii transferred to JFL club Criacao Shinjuku to play at the club from the 2023 season.

== Career statistics ==
Updated to the end of the 2022 season.

=== Club ===
Club performance			League		Cup		Total	
Season	Club	League	Apps	Goals	Apps	Goals	Apps	Goals
Japan			League		Emperor's Cup		Total	
2014	Yokohama FC	J2 League	0	0	0	0	0	0
2015	Yokohama FC	J2 League	4	0	0	0	4	0
2016	Yokohama FC	J2 League	0	0	0	0	0	0
2016	Grulla Morioka (loan)	J3 League	15	2	3	0	18	2
2017	Yokohama FC	J2 League	3	0	1	0	4	0
2018	Yokohama FC	J2 League	13	0	2	0	15	0
2019	Iwate Grulla Morioka	J3 League	24	0	1	0	25	0
2020	Iwate Grulla Morioka	J3 League	19	0	0	0	19	0
2021	Iwate Grulla Morioka	J3 League	14	1	1	0	15	1
2022	Iwate Grulla Morioka	J2 League	21	1	2	0	23	1
2023	Criacao Shinjuku	Japan Football League	0	0	0	0	0	0
Career total			97	4	7	0	104	4

=== Other games ===
Club performance			League		Total	
Season	Club	League	Apps	Goals	Apps	Goals
Japan			League		Total	
2014	J-22	J3 League	9	1	9	1
2015	J-22	J3 League	8	0	8	0
Career total			17	1	17	1
