= Yōsuke Nozaki =

Japanese footballer

Personal information
- Full name: Yōsuke Nozaki
- Date of birth: February 16, 1985 (age 41)
- Place of birth: Tsu, Mie, Japan
- Height: 1.66 m (5 ft 5 in)
- Position: Midfielder

Youth career
- 2003–2006: Mie Chukyo University

Senior career*
Years	Team	Apps	(Gls)
2007–2010	Sagan Tosu	78	(3)
2010	→ Yokohama FC (loan)	14	(0)
2011–2017	Yokohama FC	186	(23)
2018–2019	Tochigi City		
- * Club domestic league appearances and goals

Yōsuke Nozaki (野崎 陽介, Nozaki Yōsuke; born February 16, 1985 in Tsu, Mie) is a Japanese retired football player.

== Club career stats ==
Updated to 23 February 2017.

Club performance			League		Cup		Total	
Season	Club	League	Apps	Goals	Apps	Goals	Apps	Goals
Japan			League		Emperor's Cup		Total	
2007	Sagan Tosu	J2 League	22	2	2	0	24	2
2008	Sagan Tosu	J2 League	25	0	4	0	29	0
2009	Sagan Tosu	J2 League	25	1	2	0	27	1
2010	Sagan Tosu	J2 League	6	0	0	0	6	0
2010	Yokohama FC	J2 League	14	0	2	0	16	0
2011	Yokohama FC	J2 League	35	6	1	0	36	6
2012	Yokohama FC	J2 League	36	4	2	0	38	4
2013	Yokohama FC	J2 League	35	6	1	0	36	6
2014	Yokohama FC	J2 League	32	4	0	0	32	4
2015	Yokohama FC	J2 League	9	0	1	0	10	0
2016	Yokohama FC	J2 League	23	1	1	0	24	1
Total			262	24	16	0	278	24
