= Takuya Nagata =

Japanese footballer

Takuya Nagata 永田 拓也
Personal information
- Full name: Takuya Nagata
- Date of birth: 8 September 1990 (age 36)
- Place of birth: Saitama, Japan
- Height: 1.69 m (5 ft 6 1/2 in)
- Position: Left back

Youth career
- 2003–2008: Urawa Red Diamonds Youth

Senior career*
Years	Team	Apps	(Gls)
2009–2013	Urawa Red Diamonds	3	(0)
2011–2012	→ Thespa Kusatsu (loan)	64	(1)
2014–2018	Yokohama FC	100	(6)
2019–	Tokyo Verdy	11	(1)
2020–	→ Giravanz Kitakyushu (loan)		

International career^{‡}
2009	Japan U-20	3	(0)
Medal record
Urawa Reds
Runner-up	J.League Cup	2013
- * Club domestic league appearances and goals as of 2 January 2019 ‡ National team caps and goals as of 6 August 2009

Takuya Nagata (永田 拓也, Nagata Takuya; born September 8, 1990) is a Japanese football defender who plays for Giravanz Kitakyushu.

== Club career ==
In addition to his appearances in league matches with the Red Diamonds, he also has appeared three times in the J. League Cup. He is a product of the Red Diamonds' youth system.

== Career statistics ==
=== Club ===
As of 1 January 2020.

Appearances and goals by club, season and competition
Club	Season	League		Emperor's Cup		J.League Cup		AFC		Total	
Club	Season	Apps	Goals	Apps	Goals	Apps	Goals	Apps	Goals	Apps	Goals
Urawa Red Diamonds	2009	3	0	0	0	3	0	–		6	0
Urawa Red Diamonds	2010	0	0	1	0	0	0	–		1	0
Thespa Kusatsu	2011	28	1	0	0	–		–		28	1
Thespa Kusatsu	2012	36	0	1	0	–		–		37	0
Urawa Red Diamonds	2013	0	0	1	0	0	0	0	0	1	0
Yokohama FC	2014	21	0	0	0	–		–		21	0
Yokohama FC	2015	24	1	2	0	–		–		26	1
Yokohama FC	2016	23	3	2	0	–		–		25	3
Yokohama FC	2017	24	1	0	0	–		–		24	1
Yokohama FC	2018	8	1	2	0	–		–		10	1
Tokyo Verdy	2019	11	1	1	0	–		–		12	1
Career total		178	8	10	0	3	0	0	0	191	8
