= Takahiro Nakazato =

Japanese footballer (born 1990)

Takahiro Nakazato 中里 崇宏
Personal information
- Full name: Takahiro Nakazato
- Date of birth: March 29, 1990 (age 36)
- Place of birth: Tokyo, Japan
- Height: 1.74 m (5 ft 8 1/2 in)
- Position: Midfielder

Team information
- Current team: YSCC Yokohama
- Number: 50

Youth career
- 2005–2007: RKU Kashiwa High School

College career
Years	Team	Apps	(Gls)
2008–2011	Ryutsu Keizai University		

Senior career*
Years	Team	Apps	(Gls)
2010	Yokohama FC	2	(0)
2012–2019	Yokohama FC	167	(5)
2014	→ Mito Hollyhock (loan)	27	(0)
2019–2020	Gangwon FC	11	(0)
2021	Mito Hollyhock	14	(0)
2023–	YSCC Yokohama	35	(1)
- * Club domestic league appearances and goals as of 21/1/24 @ 15:47(AEST)

Takahiro Nakazato (中里 崇宏, Nakazato Takahiro; born March 29, 1990) is a Japanese football player who plays for YSCC Yokohama in the J3 League.

== Club statistics ==
Updated to 23 February 2018.

Club performance			League		Cup		Total	
Season	Club	League	Apps	Goals	Apps	Goals	Apps	Goals
Japan			League		Emperor's Cup		Total	
2010	Yokohama FC	J2 League	2	0	0	0	2	0
2012	Yokohama FC	J2 League	27	1	1	0	2	0
2013	Yokohama FC	J2 League	15	1	1	0	2	0
2014	Mito Hollyhock	J2 League	27	0	2	0	29	0
2015	Yokohama FC	J2 League	35	1	2	0	37	1
2016	Yokohama FC	J2 League	25	0	2	0	27	0
2017	Yokohama FC	J2 League	40	1	0	0	40	1
Total			171	4	8	0	179	4
