= Kensuke Sato =

Japanese footballer

Kensuke Sato 佐藤 謙介
Personal information
- Full name: Kensuke Sato
- Date of birth: January 19, 1989 (age 37)
- Place of birth: Urawa, Saitama, Japan
- Height: 1.80 m (5 ft 11 in)
- Position: Midfielder

Youth career
- Wakahisa SSS
- –2000: Kizaki SSS
- 2001–2006: Urawa Red Diamonds

College career
Years	Team	Apps	(Gls)
2007–2010	Chuo University		

Senior career*
Years	Team	Apps	(Gls)
2011–2020	Yokohama FC	308	(18)
2021-2024	Renofa Yamaguchi FC	102	(2)
- * Club domestic league appearances and goals as of 17 December 2023

Kensuke Sato (佐藤 謙介, Satō Kensuke; born January 19, 1989) is a retired Japanese football player.

== Career statistics ==
Updated to 1 March 2019.

Appearances and goals by club, season and competition
Club	Season	League			Emperor's Cup		Total	
Club	Season	Division	Apps	Goals	Apps	Goals	Apps	Goals
Yokohama FC	2011	J2 League	32	0	1	0	33	0
Yokohama FC	2012	J2 League	28	3	2	0	30	3
Yokohama FC	2013	J2 League	30	1	0	0	30	1
Yokohama FC	2014	J2 League	19	1	0	0	19	1
Yokohama FC	2015	J2 League	33	0	2	1	35	1
Yokohama FC	2016	J2 League	38	3	2	0	40	3
Yokohama FC	2017	J2 League	40	4	0	0	40	4
Yokohama FC	2018	J2 League	37	5	0	0	37	5
Career total			257	17	7	1	264	18
