= List of foreign J.League players =

This is an updated list of foreign players who have played for football clubs in the J.League (1993–present), including division levels J1 League, J2 League, J3 League, Japan Football League (1992–1998 (old JFL), 1999–present (new JFL)), Japanese Regional Leagues and Japan Soccer League (as of late 1960s into early 1990s) both junior careers and senior careers.

- In bold: Players who still are under contract at a Japanese club.
- As for dual citizen, nationality is listed under official registration.
- In this article, maybe there are players who are not listed, despite meeting the previously mentioned criteria.

== Naturalized players ==
- (Bolivia) Ko Ishikawa – Honda FC, Tokyo Verdy, Nagoya Grampus – 1989–2002
- (Brazil) Ademir Santos – Júbilo Iwata, Shimizu S-Pulse – 1987–1996
- (Brazil) Alessandro Santos – Shimizu S-Pulse, Urawa Red Diamonds, Nagoya Grampus, Tochigi SC, FC Gifu – 1997–2014
- (Brazil) Bruno Suzuki – Albirex Niigata, Machida Zelvia, FC Gifu – 2009–2012, 2016
- (Brazil) Daishiro Yoshimura – Cerezo Osaka – 1967–1980
- (Brazil) Erikson Noguchipinto – Oita Trinita, Sagan Tosu, Kashiwa Reysol, Avispa Fukuoka, Chaneaule Koriyama, Nagano Parceiro – 2001–2009
- (Brazil) George Kobayashi – Cerezo Osaka – 1971–1976
- (Brazil) George Yonashiro – Tokyo Verdy – 1972–1986
- (Brazil) Leonardo Moreira – Japan Soccer College, Sagan Tosu, Tokyo Verdy, Tochigi SC, Giravanz Kitakyushu, Blaublitz Akita, ReinMeer Aomori, Maruyasu Okazaki – 2005–2020
- (Brazil) Marcus Tulio Tanaka – Sanfrecce Hiroshima, Mito HollyHock, Urawa Red Diamonds, Nagoya Grampus, Kyoto Sanga – 2001–2020
- (Brazil) Ruy Ramos – Tokyo Verdy, Kyoto Sanga – 1977–1998
- (Brazil) Wagner Lopes – Yokohama F. Marinos, Kashiwa Reysol, Honda FC, Shonan Bellmare, FC Tokyo, Avispa Fukuoka – 1987–2002
- (Netherlands) Dido Havenaar – Sanfrecce Hiroshima, Tokyo Verdy, Nagoya Grampus, Júbilo Iwata, Hokkaido Consadole Sapporo – 1986–1998
- (New Zealand) **Michael Fitzgerald** – **Albirex Niigata**, Japan Soccer College, Zweigen Kanazawa, V-Varen Nagasaki, Kawasaki Frontale – 2008–
- (Peru) Edwin Uehara – Urawa Red Diamonds, Sagan Tosu – 1992–1996
- (Peru) **Frank Romero** – Mito HollyHock, Montedio Yamagata, Albirex Niigata, Machida Zelvia, Kagoshima United, **Reilac Shiga** – 2011–
- (Spain) **Sergio Escudero** – Urawa Red Diamonds, Kyoto Sanga, Tochigi SC, **Edo All United** – 2005–2012, 2016–2020, 2025–
- (United States) Cayman Togashi – Yokohama F. Marinos, FC Tokyo, Machida Zelvia, V-Varen Nagasaki, Vegalta Sendai, Sagan Tosu – 2015–2024
- (United States) **Daniel Schmidt** – Vegalta Sendai, Roasso Kumamoto, Matsumoto Yamaga, **Nagoya Grampus** – 2014–2019, 2025–

== Albania ==
- Rudi Vata – Yokohama FC – 2003

== Algeria ==
- Aymen Tahar – Sagan Tosu – 2016
- Raïs M'Bolhi – FC Ryukyu – 2008–2009

== Argentina ==
=== A ===
- Abel Luciatti – Renofa Yamaguchi – 2017
- **Agustin Ortega** – Blaublitz Akita, **Esperanza SC** – 2015–
- Alberto Acosta – Yokohama F. Marinos – 1996

=== C ===
- Carlos Mayor – Avispa Fukuoka – 1994–1996
- Claudio Biaggio – Avispa Fukuoka – 2001
- Claudio Úbeda – Tokyo Verdy – 2004

=== D ===
- Daniel Ahmed – Hokkaido Consadole Sapporo – 1992
- Darío Figueroa – Yokohama F. Marinos – 1996
- David Bisconti – Yokohama F. Marinos, Avispa Fukuoka, Sagan Tosu – 1993–1996, 2000–2002
- Diego Rodríguez – JEF United Chiba – 2018

=== E ===
- Eduardo Bustos Montoya – Avispa Fukuoka – 2000

=== F ===
- Félix Dalmás – Laranja Kyoto, SP Kyoto – 2010–2013
- Fernando Moner – Yokohama Flügels, Yokohama FC – 1988–1991, 1993–1994, 2002–2003
- Fernando Oliva – Shimizu S-Pulse – 1996–2001
- Flavio Zandoná – Avispa Fukuoka – 2000
- Franco Sbuttoni – Sagan Tosu – 2017

=== G ===
- Gustavo Zapata – Yokohama F. Marinos – 1993–1996

=== H ===
- Héctor Enrique – Sagan Tosu, FPI Hamamatsu – 1994–1997
- Hugo Maradona – Sagan Tosu, Avispa Fukuoka, Hokkaido Consadole Sapporo – 1992–1998

=== J ===
- Joaquín Larrivey – JEF United Chiba – 2017–2018
- Jorge Sebastián Núñez – Nagoya Grampus, Hokkaido Consadole Sapporo – 2005–2006
- Juan Forlín – Jubilo Iwata – 2020–2021
- Julio Hernán Rossi – Avispa Fukuoka – 1997

=== L ===
- Leandro Desábato – Cerezo Osaka, Vegalta Sendai – 2019–2022
- Leonardo Ramos –Renofa Yamaguchi – 2017
- Luciano Romero – Renofa Yamaguchi – 2016
- Luis Ojeda – JEF United Chiba – 2017

=== M ===
- Marcelo Carracedo – Avispa Fukuoka – 1997
- Marcelo Morales – Urawa Red Diamonds – 1993
- Marcelo Trivisonno – Urawa Red Diamonds – 1992–1993
- Marcelo Vidal – Renofa Yamaguchi – 2017
- Martín Vilallonga – Avispa Fukuoka – 2001
- Mauro dos Santos – Albirex Niigata – 2020

=== N ===
- Nahuel Cisneros – Esperanza SC – 2022
- Néstor Gorosito – Yokohama F. Marinos – 1996
- Nestor Omar Piccoli – Yokohama Flügels, Avispa Fukuoka – 1987–1990, 1992–1995
- Nicolás Orsini – Tokushima Vortis, Fagiano Okayama – 2016–2018

=== O ===
- Oscar Acosta – Yokohama Flügels – 1991
- Osvaldo Escudero – Urawa Red Diamonds – 1991–1992

=== P ===
- Pablo Bastianini – Yokohama F. Marinos – 2010–2011
- **Pablo Ortega** – **Esperanza SC** – 2016–
- Patricio Mac Allister – Urawa Red Diamonds – 1991–1992
- Pedro Massacessi – Yokohama F. Marinos – 1995
- Pedro Pasculli – Sagan Tosu – 1994
- Pedro Troglio – Avispa Fukuoka – 1994–1996

=== R ===
- Ramón Díaz – Yokohama F. Marinos – 1993–1995
- Ramón Medina Bello – Yokohama F. Marinos – 1994–1995
- Raul Maldonado – Yokohama F. Marinos – 2000

=== S ===
- Sebastián Riep – Avispa Fukuoka – 1997
- Sergio Batista – Sagan Tosu – 1993–1994
- Sergio Escudero – Urawa Red Diamonds – 1992
- Sergio Vázquez – Avispa Fukuoka – 1997
- Silvio Rudman – Yokohama Flügels – 1992

=== T ===
- Tomás Moschión – FC Imabari – 2024

=== V ===
- Victor Ferreyra – Urawa Red Diamonds – 1993

== Australia ==
=== A ===
- Adam Taggart – Cerezo Osaka – 2021–2022
- Alex Brosque – Shimizu S-Pulse – 2011–2012
- Alvin Ceccoli – Avispa Fukuoka – 2007
- Andre Takami – Brew Kashima – 2023
- Andrew Nabbout – Urawa Red Diamonds – 2018–2019
- Aurelio Vidmar – Sanfrecce Hiroshima – 1998–1999

=== B ===
- Ben Duncan – Ehime FC – 2023–2025
- Ben Halloran – V-Varen Nagasaki – 2018
- Billy Celeski – Ventforet Kofu – 2016
- Billy Konstantinidis – Ventforet Kofu – 2017

=== C ===
- Chay Hews – Shonan Bellmare – 1999

=== D ===
- **Dan Hall** – **JEF United Chiba** – 2026–
- Diogo Ferreira – Tochigi SC – 2018

=== E ===
- Eddy Bosnar – JEF United Chiba, Shimizu S-Pulse – 2008–2011
- **Eli Adams** – **Gamba Osaka** – 2026–

=== G ===
- Graham Arnold – Sanfrecce Hiroshima – 1997–1999

=== H ===
- Hayden Foxe – Sanfrecce Hiroshima – 1998–2000

=== J ===
- Jade North – FC Tokyo, Hokkaido Consadole Sapporo – 2011–2012
- **Jason Geria** – JEF United Chiba, **Albirex Niigata** – 2018–2021, 2025–
- **Joe Caletti** – Tochigi City – 2022–2023, 2025–
- Joel Griffiths – Avispa Fukuoka – 2008
- Jonas Markovski – FC Osaka – 2024
- Joshua Kennedy – Nagoya Grampus – 2009–2014
- **Jackson Irvine** – Cerezo Osaka - 2026–

=== K ===
- **Kusini Yengi** – Cerezo Osaka, **Sanfrecce Hiroshima** – 2026–

=== L ===
- Lucas Neill – RB Omiya Ardija – 2013
- **Luka Didulica** – **Urawa Red Diamonds** – 2025–

=== M ===
- Mark Milligan – JEF United Chiba – 2010–2012
- Matthew Bingley – Vissel Kobe, JEF United Chiba – 1997–1998
- Matthew Spiranovic – Urawa Red Diamonds – 2010–2012
- Max King – Tiamo Hirakata – 2020–2021
- Miloš Degenek – Yokohama F. Marinos – 2017–2018
- Mitch Duke – Shimizu S-Pulse, Fagiano Okayama, Machida Zelvia – 2015–2018, 2021–2025
- Mitch Nichols – Cerezo Osaka – 2014–2015
- Mitchell Langerak – Nagoya Grampus – 2018–2024

=== N ===
- Nathan Burns – FC Tokyo, Sanfrecce Hiroshima – 2015–2017
- Ned Zelic – JEF United Chiba, Urawa Red Diamonds – 2002–2003

=== O ===
- Oliver Bozanic – Ventforet Kofu – 2017

=== P ===
- Phil Stubbins – Sanfrecce Hiroshima – 1999
- Pierce Waring – Cerezo Osaka – 2018–2021

=== R ===
- Ryan Wood – Sports & Society Izu – 2023

=== S ===
- Stefan Mauk – Fagiano Okayama – 2022–2023
- Stephen Laybutt – Shonan Bellmare – 1999
- Steve Corica – Sanfrecce Hiroshima – 2000–2001

=== T ===
- Tando Velaphi – Shonan Bellmare, Kochi United – 2016–2017, 2022–2023
- **Tete Yengi** – Machida Zelvia – 2026-
- **Thomas Deng** – Urawa Red Diamonds, Albirex Niigata, **Yokohama F. Marinos** – 2020–
- **Tom Glover** – **RB Omiya Ardija** – 2026–
- **Tom Heward-Belle** – **Montedio Yamagata** – 2025–
- Tony Popovic – Sanfrecce Hiroshima – 1997–2000

=== U ===
- Ufuk Talay – Avispa Fukuoka – 2008

=== W ===
- Westel Kaur – Laranja Kyoto – 2018

== Austria ==
- Ivica Vastić – Nagoya Grampus – 2002–2003
- Mario Haas – JEF United Chiba – 2005–2006
- Michael Baur – Urawa Red Diamonds – 1997
- Mladen Jutrić – Ehime FC – 2019

== Barbados ==
- Peter Hinds – Shonan Bellmare – 1988–1989

== Belarus ==
- Sergei Aleinikov – Gamba Osaka – 1993–1996

== Belgium ==
- **Jan Van den Bergh** – **Júbilo Iwata** – 2025–
- **Jordy Croux** – Avispa Fukuoka, Cerezo Osaka, Júbilo Iwata, **Yokohama F. Marinos** – 2021–
- Kevin Oris – Kyoto Sanga – 2017
- Lorenzo Staelens – Oita Trinita – 2001
- Thomas Vermaelen – Vissel Kobe – 2019–2021

== Bolivia ==
- Edivaldo Hermoza – Shonan Bellmare – 2013
- Julio César Baldivieso – Yokohama F. Marinos – 1997–1998
- Víctor Hugo Antelo – Shonan Bellmare – 1990
- Yuto Baigorria – Fagiano Okayama – 2025–2026

== Bosnia and Herzegovina ==
- Albin Pelak – Cerezo Osaka – 2003
- Aleksandar Perendija – Nagoya SC – 2018, 2020
- Alen Avdić – Avispa Fukuoka – 2002
- Almir Turković – Cerezo Osaka – 2002
- Edin Mujčin – JEF United Chiba – 2001–2002
- Ivan Radeljić – Cerezo Osaka – 2004
- Mirko Hrgović – Gamba Osaka, JEF United Chiba – 2001, 2008
- Nermin Haskić – RB Omiya Ardija – 2019–2021
- Rade Bogdanović – JEF United Chiba – 1997
- Srđan Pecelj – Shimizu S-Pulse – 2002

== Brazil ==
=== A ===
- Abelha – Honda FC – 1989–1991
- Abuda – FC Gifu, Tokyo Verdy – 2012, 2014
- **Adaílton** – Júbilo Iwata, FC Tokyo, Ventforet Kofu, **Yokohama FC** – 2015–2024, 2025–
- Adalto – Hokkaido Consadole Sapporo − 2001
- Ademilson – Yokohama F. Marinos, Gamba Osaka, Machida Zelvia – 2015–2020, 2023
- Adhemar – Yokohama F. Marinos – 2005
- Adi Rocha – Gamba Osaka – 2013
- Adiel – Urawa Red Diamonds, Shonan Bellmare – 2000, 2006–2011
- Adílson – Júbilo Iwata – 1987–1989
- Adilson Batista – Júbilo Iwata – 1997–1999
- Adriano – Cerezo Osaka, Tokushima Vortis, Ventforet Kofu – 2010, 2014, 2015
- Adriano Oliveira – Shonan Bellmare – 2009
- Adriano Pimenta – Nagoya Grampus, Yokohama FC – 2001, 2007
- Adriel – Gainare Tottori – 2019–2020
- Afonso – Gamba Osaka – 2011
- Agenor – SC Sagamihara – 2021
- Aílton – Kawasaki Frontale – 2001
- Aílton Ferraz – Kashiwa Reysol – 1993–1994
- Alair – Ventforet Kofu, Ehime FC, Kyoto Sanga – 2002–2006, 2009–2013
- Alan – Giravanz Kitakyushu, Fujieda MYFC, Dezzolla Shimane, ReinMeer Aomori – 2008–2015
- Alan Bahia – Vissel Kobe – 2009
- Alan Cariús – Kyoto Sanga – 2022–2023
- Alan Dotti – Montedio Yamagata – 1999
- Alan Mineiro – Albirex Niigata – 2012
- Alan Pinheiro – Kawasaki Frontale, Tokyo Verdy, JEF United Chiba – 2013, 2015–2020
- Alberto – Ventforet Kofu – 2007
- Alceu – Kashiwa Reysol, Hokkaido Consadole Sapporo, Montedio Yamagata – 2007–2010, 2015–2017
- Alcindo – Kashima Antlers, Tokyo Verdy, Hokkaido Consadole Sapporo – 1993–1996
- Aldro – Gamba Osaka, Yokohama Flügels, Montedio Yamagata – 1990–1997
- Alê – Cerezo Osaka – 2007–2008
- Alemão – Kyoto Sanga – 2005–2006
- Alessandro – Albirex Niigata, Kyoto Sanga – 2008, 2014
- Alessandro Cambalhota – Júbilo Iwata – 1997–1998
- Alex – Cerezo Osaka – 1997
- Alex – Oita Trinita – 1999
- Alex – Ventforet Kofu – 2001
- Alex – Kawasaki Frontale, Avispa Fukuoka, Kashiwa Reysol, JEF United Chiba, Kashima Antlers, Tokushima Vortis, Kamatamare Sanuki – 2002–2018
- Alex Garcia – RB Omiya Ardija – 2001
- Alex Henrique – Avispa Fukuoka, Thespa Gunma, Tokyo Verdy – 2009, 2010–2012
- Alex Martins – Shonan Bellmare, Fukushima United, Kagoshima United, Tochigi SC – 2012, 2016–2018
- Alex Mineiro – Kashima Antlers – 2005–2006
- Alex Muralha – Shonan Bellmare, Albirex Niigata – 2013, 2018
- Alex Oliveira – Ventforet Kofu – 2005
- Alex Rafael – Thespa Gunma – 2012
- Alexandre – Avispa Fukuoka – 2006
- **Alex Souza** – **Kyoto Sanga** – 2026–
- Alexandre Balotelli – SC Sagamihara – 2016
- Alexandre Finazzi – RB Omiya Ardija – 2003
- Alexandre Goulart – Shimizu S-Pulse – 2006–2007
- Alexandre Lopes – Tokyo Verdy – 2002–2003
- Alexandre Torres – Nagoya Grampus – 1995–1999
- Alison – RB Omiya Ardija – 2006–2007
- Alison – Shonan Bellmare – 2015
- Allan – Reilac Shiga, Kamatamare Sanuki, Zweigen Kanazawa, Esperanza SC – 2008–2022
- Allano – Ventforet Kofu – 2019
- Allisson Ricardo – Matsumoto Yamaga – 2012
- Almir – Shonan Bellmare – 1994–1996
- Almir – Tokushima Vortis, FC Tokyo, Hokkaido Consadole Sapporo – 1995–1996, 1998–2001
- Álvaro – Montedio Yamagata, Matsumoto Yamaga – 2018–2020
- Amaral – FC Tokyo, Shonan Bellmare, Arte Takasaki, FC Kariya – 1992–2007, 2009
- Amaral – Cerezo Osaka – 2010
- Amarildo – Shonan Bellmare – 2006
- Anaílson – Tokyo Verdy – 2006
- Anderson – Yokohama FC – 2007
- Anderson – Hokkaido Consadole Sapporo – 2008
- Anderson Andrade – Mito HollyHock, Sagan Tosu, Shimizu S-Pulse, Yokohama FC, Roasso Kumamoto – 2006–2008, 2014–2016
- Anderson Batatais – Albirex Niigata – 2003–2004
- Anderson Carvalho – Vissel Kobe – 2012
- **Anderson Chaves** – **Fujieda MYFC** – 2023–
- Anderson Gils – Yokohama Flügels – 1997–1998
- Anderson Gonzaga – Albirex Niigata, Fagiano Okayama, Machida Zelvia – 2011–2013
- Ânderson Lima – Albirex Niigata – 2005
- **Anderson Lopes** – Sanfrecce Hiroshima, Hokkaido Consadole Sapporo, Yokohama F. Marinos,**Vissel Kobe** – 2016–2017, 2019–2025, 2026–
- Andradina – Gamba Osaka, Oita Trinita, Albirex Niigata, Hokkaido Consadole Sapporo – 2000–2003
- André – Oita Trinita, Sagan Tosu – 2000
- André Bahia – Shonan Bellmare – 2015–2019
- André Neitzke – Cerezo Osaka, Tokushima Vortis – 2006–2008
- André Pinto – Kyoto Sanga – 2006–2007
- André Silva – Montedio Yamagata – 2009
- Andrei Girotto – Kyoto Sanga – 2016
- Andrey – Sanfrecce Hiroshima – 1993–1995
- Andrezinho – Hokkaido Consadole Sapporo – 2011
- Angelo – Yokohama Flügels, Kyoto Sanga, Montedio Yamagata, FC Tokyo – 1993–1998
- Anselmo Ramon – Kashiwa Reysol – 2009
- Antônio – Ventforet Kofu – 2000
- Antônio Carlos – Sanfrecce Hiroshima – 1996–1997
- Antônio Carlos Zago – Kashiwa Reysol – 1996–1997
- Apodi – Tokyo Verdy – 2011
- Aragoney – Kawasaki Frontale – 2005
- Argel Fuchs – Tokyo Verdy – 1996–1997
- Ari – Kashima Antlers – 2005
- Arley – Sagan Tosu – 2005
- Arthur Caíke – Kashima Antlers – 2021–2023
- Arthur Maia – Kawasaki Frontale – 2015
- **Arthur Silva** – FC Tokyo, Yokohama FC, Kataller Toyama, RB Omiya Ardija, **Shonan Bellmare** – 2019–
- Assis – Hokkaido Consadole Sapporo – 1999
- Ataliba – Vissel Kobe, Kyoto Sanga – 2002, 2008
- Augusto – Kashima Antlers, Kawasaki Frontale – 2001–2005
- Augusto César – Matsumoto Yamaga – 2020
- Axel – Cerezo Osaka – 2003

=== B ===
- Baltazar – Kyoto Sanga – 1995–1996
- Baré – RB Omiya Ardija, Ventforet Kofu, Gamba Osaka, Shimizu S-Pulse – 2001, 2003–2008, 2013, 2015
- Baron – Ventforet Kofu, JEF United Chiba, Shimizu S-Pulse, Cerezo Osaka, Kashima Antlers, Vegalta Sendai, Vissel Kobe, Avispa Fukuoka – 1996, 1998–2006
- Basílio – Kashiwa Reysol, Tokyo Verdy – 1998, 2006
- Bebeto – Kashima Antlers – 2000
- Bentinho – Tokyo Verdy, Kashiwa Reysol, Oita Trinita, Kawasaki Frontale, Avispa Fukuoka – 1994–1995, 1998–1999, 2001–2004
- Bernardo – Cerezo Osaka – 1995
- Betinho – Shonan Bellmare, Kawasaki Frontale – 1993–1998
- Beto – Montedio Yamagata, Albirex Niigata – 1994, 2002
- Beto – Hokkaido Consadole Sapporo, Sanfrecce Hiroshima – 2003–2006
- Biju – Hokkaido Consadole Sapporo, Kyoto Sanga, Sagan Tosu, Ventforet Kofu, Mito HollyHock, Zweigen Kanazawa – 1999–2009
- Bismarck – Tokyo Verdy, Kashima Antlers, Vissel Kobe – 1993–2001, 2003
- Boka – Thespa Gunma – 2016
- Branquinho – Cerezo Osaka – 2012–2013
- Brenner – Iwate Grulla Morioka – 2020–2022
- Bruno – Ventforet Kofu, Gainare Tottori – 2008–2009, 2013
- Bruno – FC Gifu, Atletico Suzuka – 2011–2012
- Bruno Cabrerizo – Sagan Tosu – 2003
- Bruno Correa – Shonan Bellmare – 2015
- Bruno Cortez – Albirex Niigata – 2015–2016
- Bruno Coutinho – Tokyo Verdy – 2015
- Bruno Dybal – Ventforet Kofu – 2015
- Bruno Ferraz – Hokkaido Consadole Sapporo – 2011
- Bruno Formigoni – Cerezo Osaka – 2009
- Bruno José – Júbilo Iwata – 2024
- Bruno Lopes – Albirex Niigata, Montedio Yamagata – 2011–2014, 2018
- Bruno Mendes – Cerezo Osaka, Avispa Fukuoka – 2019–2022
- Bruno Meneghel – Cerezo Osaka, Albirex Niigata, Yokohama FC – 2016, 2018
- Bruno Paraíba – Ventforet Kofu – 2022
- Bruno Quadros – Cerezo Osaka, Hokkaido Consadole Sapporo, FC Tokyo – 2005–2009
- Bruno Roque – Kashiwa Reysol – 2007
- Bruno Uvini – FC Tokyo – 2021–2022
- Buba – FC Imabari – 2017
- Bueno – Shimizu S-Pulse, Vissel Kobe, Kashima Antlers, Tokushima Vortis, Kashiwa Reysol – 2014–2023
- Buiú – Kashiwa Reysol – 1998

=== C ===
- Caboré – FC Tokyo – 2008–2009
- Cacá – Tokushima Vortis – 2021–2023
- Cadu – Kawasaki Frontale – 1999
- **Caetano** – **Vissel Kobe** – 2025–
- Caíco – Tokyo Verdy – 1996
- Caio César – Kawasaki Frontale, V-Varen Nagasaki – 2018–2023
- Capitão – Tokyo Verdy – 1994
- **Capixaba** – Cerezo Osaka, **Shimizu S-Pulse** – 2023–
- Capone – Kyoto Sanga – 1997
- Careca – Kashiwa Reysol – 1993–1996
- Careca – Ventforet Kofu, Thespa Gunma, Cerezo Osaka, Shonan Bellmare – 2004, 2007–2008
- Carlão – Kashima Antlers – 2011–2012
- **Carlinhos Júnior** – Shimizu S-Pulse, JEF United Chiba, **RB Omiya Ardija** – 2020–
- Carlinhos Paraíba – RB Omiya Ardija, Júbilo Iwata, Tokushima Vortis – 2012–2017
- Carlos – Kashima Antlers – 1992–1993
- Carlos Mozer – Kashima Antlers – 1995–1996
- Cauê – Hokkaido Consadole Sapporo – 2007
- Cauê Cecilio – RB Omiya Ardija, Albirex Niigata, Avispa Fukuoka – 2017–2019, 2021
- Celso – Shimizu S-Pulse – 1993
- Celso Vieira – Vegalta Sendai – 2001
- César Sampaio – Yokohama Flügels, Kashiwa Reysol, Sanfrecce Hiroshima – 1995–1998, 2002–2004
- Cezar – Sagan Tosu – 2005
- Charles – Nagoya Grampus – 2017
- Chika – Okinawa Kariyushi, Thespa Gunma – 2003–2007
- Chimba – SC Sagamihara – 2016
- Chiquinho – Shonan Bellmare, Oita Trinita – 2017
- Christian – RB Omiya Ardija – 2005
- Chumbinho – Kashima Antlers – 2006
- Claiton – Nagoya Grampus, Hokkaido Consadole Sapporo – 2004–2005, 2008–2009
- Claudecir – Kashima Antlers – 2003
- Claudinho – Cerezo Osaka – 1997
- Cláudio – Shonan Bellmare, Cerezo Osaka – 1997–1999, 2001
- Clayson − V-Varen Nagasaki − 2022–2023
- Cleber – Mito HollyHock – 2000
- Cléber Arado – Kyoto Sanga – 1997
- Cléber Santana – Kashiwa Reysol – 2005
- Cleberson – Tokushima Vortis – 2007
- Clemerson – Shimizu S-Pulse, Gamba Osaka – 2004–2005
- Cléo – Kashiwa Reysol – 2013
- Conrado – Nagano Parceiro – 2016
- Crislan – Vegalta Sendai, Shimizu S-Pulse, Shonan Bellmare – 2017–2020
- Cristian Alex – FC Gifu – 2017
- Cristiano – Tochigi SC, Ventforet Kofu, Kashiwa Reysol, V-Varen Nagasaki – 2013–2023
- Cristiano – Iwate Grulla Morioka – 2022–2023

=== D ===
- Da Silva – Tokushima Vortis – 2007–2008
- Daniel – Kyoto Sanga, Vissel Kobe – 1997, 2001–2002
- Daniel Alves – JEF United Chiba – 2022
- Daniel da Silva – Tokyo Verdy – 1998
- Daniel Gigante – Thespa Gunma – 2010
- Daniel Lemos – Hokkaido Consadole Sapporo, FC Gifu, ReinMeer Aomori – 2011, 2013–2014
- Daniel Lovinho – Thespa Gunma, Kyoto Sanga – 2013–2016
- Daniel Pitbull – Kawasaki Frontale – 2001
- Daniel Rossi – Kawasaki Frontale – 2000
- Daniel Tijolo – Ventforet Kofu, Nagoya Grampus, Oita Trinita – 2009–2016
- Danilo – Kashima Antlers – 2007–2009
- Danilo – FC Gifu – 2012
- **Danilo Boza** – **Urawa Reds Diamonds** – 2025
- **Danilo Cardoso** – FC Imabari, **Mito HollyHock** – 2025–
- **Danilo Gomes** – **Albirex Niigata** – 2023–
- Dankler – Vissel Kobe – 2019–2021
- Davi – Tokyo Verdy – 1992
- Davi – Hokkaido Consadole Sapporo, Nagoya Grampus, Ventforet Kofu, Matsumoto Yamaga, Giravanz Kitakyushu – 2007–2009, 2012–2018
- Davi – Albirex Niigata – 2008
- **David Silva** – **Kyoto Sanga** – 2026–
- David da Silva – Zweigen Kanazawa – 2016
- Dawhan – Gamba Osaka – 2022–2024
- Dedimar – Júbilo Iwata, Tokyo Verdy – 1998, 2006
- Deili – Ventforet Kofu – 2001
- **Deivisson** – **Nankatsu SC** – 2017–
- Dellatorre – Montedio Yamagata – 2022–2023
- Denilson – Yokohama Flügels – 1996
- Dênis Marques – RB Omiya Ardija – 2007–2010
- Denni – Montedio Yamagata – 2004
- **Derik Lacerda** – **Kawasaki Frontale** – 2026–
- **Derlan** – **Oita Trinita** – 2023–
- Deyvid Sacconi – Vegalta Sendai – 2012
- **Diego**– Matsumoto Yamaga, Mito HollyHock, Tokushima Vortis, Sagan Tosu, Kashiwa Reysol, **Vissel Kobe** – 2017–
- **Dieguinho** – **Shimizu S-Pulse** – 2026–
- Diego Macedo – Hokkaido Consadole Sapporo – 2016–2017
- Diego Oliveira – Kashiwa Reysol, FC Tokyo – 2016–2024
- **Diego Pituca** – Kashima Antlers, **V-Varen Nagasaki** – 2021–2023, 2025–
- Diego Rosa – Montedio Yamagata – 2016
- Diego Souza – Vissel Kobe, Kashiwa Reysol, Tokyo Verdy, Kyoto Sanga, Vegalta Sendai, Montedio Yamagata – 2005–2011, 2014–2016
- Dinei – Hokkaido Consadole Sapporo – 1999
- Dinei – Kashima Antlers, Shonan Bellmare, Ventforet Kofu, Matsumoto Yamaga – 2015–2018
- Dininho – Sanfrecce Hiroshima – 2005–2006
- Diogo – Vegalta Sendai – 2013
- Diogo Mateus – Kawasaki Frontale – 2020
- Diogo Oliveira – Hokkaido Consadole Sapporo, Tokushima Vortis – 2011–2012
- Djalminha – Shimizu S-Pulse – 1994
- Doda – Vegalta Sendai – 2003
- Dodi – Kashiwa Reysol – 2021–2022
- Dodô – Oita Trinita – 2005
- Dodô – Ehime FC, Gamba Osaka, Gainare Tottori – 2010–2012
- Donizete Oliveira – Urawa Red Diamonds – 2001
- Donizete Pantera – Tokyo Verdy – 1996
- Doriva – Matsumoto Yamaga – 2015
- Douglas – Tokushima Vortis, Kyoto Sanga, Sanfrecce Hiroshima, Shimizu S-Pulse, Vissel Kobe, Kashiwa Reysol – 2010–2015, 2018–2023
- Douglas – Ventforet Kofu, Yokohama FC – 2012–2014
- Douglas – Roasso Kumamoto – 2013
- Douglas Grolli – Avispa Fukuoka – 2020–2024
- Douglas Oliveira – Hokkaido Consadole Sapporo, Iwate Grulla Morioka – 2020–2023
- Douglas Rinaldi – Ehime FC – 2010
- Douglas Tanque – Thespa Gunma, Albirex Niigata, Shimizu S-Pulse – 2015, 2017, 2024–2025
- Douglas Vieira – Tokyo Verdy, Sanfrecce Hiroshima – 2016–2024
- Duda – Kashiwa Reysol – 1998
- Dudu – RB Omiya Ardija – 2009–2010
- Dudu – Kashiwa Reysol, Ventforet Kofu, Avispa Fukuoka, Machida Zelvia, FC Imabari, JEF United Chiba – 2014, 2016–2024
- Dudu – Kashiwa Reysol – 2016–2018
- Dudu Cearense – Kashiwa Reysol – 2004
- **Dudu Pacheco** – Júbilo Iwata, **JEF United Chiba** – 2022–
- Dunga – Júbilo Iwata – 1995–1998
- Dutra – Yokohama F. Marinos – 2001–2006, 2012–2014

=== E ===
- Eder – Yokohama FC – 2009–2011
- Eder – Thespa Gunma – 2013–2014
- Éder Ceccon – Vegalta Sendai – 2003
- Éder Lima – Ventforet Kofu – 2017–2019
- Éderson – Kashiwa Reysol – 2015–2018
- **Edigar Junio** – Yokohama F. Marinos, V-Varen Nagasaki, **FC Imabari** – 2019–
- Edílson – Kashiwa Reysol, Nagoya Grampus – 1996–1997, 2002–2003, 2006
- Edinaldo – Mito HollyHock – 2007
- Edinho – Kashima Antlers – 1994
- Edinho Baiano – Kyoto Sanga – 2000
- Edivaldo – Gamba Osaka – 1992
- Edmar – Vegalta Sendai – 1995–1997
- Edmilson – Kawasaki Frontale – 2001
- Edmílson – Albirex Niigata, Urawa Red Diamonds, FC Tokyo, Cerezo Osaka – 2004–2012, 2015
- Edmilson Alves – Oita Trinita, Vissel Kobe, Roasso Kumamoto – 2003, 2011
- Edmílson Matias – Kyoto Sanga, Yokohama F. Marinos – 1995–1998, 2000
- Edmundo – Tokyo Verdy, Urawa Red Diamonds – 2000–2003
- Edno – Cerezo Osaka – 2013
- Edson – Tokyo Verdy, Shonan Bellmare, Yokogawa Musashino – 1986–1995, 1997–2000
- Edson – Hokkaido Consadole Sapporo – 2008
- Edson Araújo – RB Omiya Ardija – 2003
- Edu – FC Tokyo – 2014
- Edu Manga – Shimizu S-Pulse – 1993
- Edu Marangon – Yokohama Flügels – 1993–1994
- Eduardo – Nagoya Grampus – 2008
- **Eduardo** – Gainare Tottori, Tochigi SC, Kashiwa Reysol, Kawasaki Frontale, Matsumoto Yamaga, Sagan Tosu, Yokohama F. Marinos, **V-Varen Nagasaki** – 2013–
- Eduardo Diniz – Gamba Osaka – 2012
- Eduardo Kunde – SC Sagamihara – 2021
- Eduardo Mancha – Ventforet Kofu – 2022–2025
- Eduardo Marques – Shonan Bellmare – 2007
- Eduardo Neto – Kawasaki Frontale, Nagoya Grampus, Oita Trinita – 2016–2019, 2022
- Efrain Rintaro – Kashiwa Reysol, FC Gifu, Blaublitz Akita, FC Ryukyu, Veertien Mie, ReinMeer Aomori, Suzuka Point Getters, FC Osaka, Veertien Mie – 2010–2023
- **Élber** – Yokohama F. Marinos, **Kashima Antlers** – 2021–
- Eliézio – Urawa Red Diamonds, Fukushima United – 2005, 2018
- Elivélton – Nagoya Grampus – 1993–1994
- Elizeu – Yokohama FC, Vegalta Sendai, Tokushima Vortis – 2008–2012
- Elpídio Silva – Kashiwa Reysol – 1997–1998
- **Elsinho** – Kawasaki Frontale, Shimizu S-Pulse, **Tokushima Vortis** – 2015–
- Eltinho – Yokohama F. Marinos – 2007
- Élton – JEF United Chiba – 2016–2017
- Embu – Tokyo Verdy – 1995
- Émerson – Shonan Bellmare – 1995
- Emerson – Tokyo Verdy – 2001
- Émerson – Shimizu S-Pulse – 2003
- **Emerson Deocleciano** – **V-Varen Nagasaki** – 2025–
- Emerson Paulista – FC Tokyo, Shonan Bellmare – 2008, 2010
- Emerson Santos – Kashiwa Reysol – 2021–2022
- Emerson Thome – Vissel Kobe – 2006–2007
- Enílton – RB Omiya Ardija – 2007
- Eric – Matsumoto Yamaga – 2015
- **Erik** – Yokohama F. Marinos, **FC Machida Zelvia** – 2019–2020, 2023–
- **Erison** – Kawasaki Frontale, **JEF United Chiba** – 2024–
- Euller – Tokyo Verdy, Kashima Antlers – 1998, 2002–2003
- Evair – Yokohama Flügels – 1995–1996
- Evaldo – FC Tokyo – 2007–2009
- Evandro Paulista – FC Gifu, Oita Trinita – 2015–2016
- Everaldo – Kashima Antlers – 2020–2022
- Everton Nogueira – Yokohama F. Marinos, Kyoto Sanga – 1991–1994
- Éverton Santos – Albirex Niigata – 2009
- Evson – Gamba Osaka, Kamatamare Sanuki – 2014–2017
- Ewerton – Urawa Red Diamonds, Vegalta Sendai – 2019–2021, 2023
- Eydison – Matsumoto Yamaga – 2012
- Ezequiel – Sanfrecce Hiroshima – 2020–2024

=== F ===
- Fabão – Kashima Antlers – 2007
- Fabiano – Kashima Antlers, Vegalta Sendai – 2000–2003
- Fabinho – Gamba Osaka, Shimizu S-Pulse – 2002, 2004
- Fabinho – Cerezo Osaka, Yokohama FC – 2005, 2011
- Fabinho Santos – Oita Trinita, Albirex Niigata, Vegalta Sendai – 2002–2007
- Fábio Aguiar – SC Sagamihara, Yokohama F. Marinos, Gamba Osaka – 2012–2018
- Fábio Amorim – Shonan Bellmare – 2015
- **Fábio Azevedo** – **FC Gifu** – 2026–
- Fábio Gomes – Albirex Niigata – 2020
- Fábio Júnior – Kashima Antlers – 2004
- Fábio Lopes – Cerezo Osaka – 2011
- Fábio Martins – Fukushima United – 2013
- Fábio Nunes – Vegalta Sendai – 2004
- Fábio Pena – Roasso Kumamoto – 2010–2014
- Fábio Santos – Kashima Antlers – 2006
- Fábio Santos – Tokushima Vortis – 2009
- Fabio Simplicio – Cerezo Osaka, Vissel Kobe – 2012–2014
- Fabrício – Kyoto Sanga – 2000
- Fabrício – Júbilo Iwata – 2006–2007
- Fabrício – Kashima Antlers, Urawa Red Diamonds – 2016, 2018–2021
- Fágner – Montedio Yamagata, Albirex Niigata – 2009–2010
- Felipe – Vegalta Sendai, Fukushima United – 2007
- Felipe Alves – Matsumoto Yamaga – 2013
- Felipe Barros – Yokohama FC – 2014–2017
- Felipe Bortolucci – Tochigi SC – 2015
- Felipe Félix – Hokkaido Consadole Sapporo, Kyoto Sanga, Giravanz Kitakyushu – 2013, 2015, 2018
- Felipe Garcia – Nagoya Grampus – 2017–2018
- **Felipe Sajioro** – **FC Tiamo Hirakata** – 2026–
- Felipe Silva – Sanfrecce Hiroshima – 2017–2018
- Felipe Tavares – FC Ryukyu – 2020–2021
- Felipinho – FC Osaka, Tegevajaro Miyazaki – 2014–2017
- Felippe Cardoso – Vegalta Sendai – 2021–2022
- Fellipe Bertoldo – Oita Trinita, Verspah Oita – 2015
- Fellype Gabriel – Kashima Antlers – 2010–2012
- Ferdinando – Júbilo Iwata – 2014
- Fernandinho – Gamba Osaka, Shimizu S-Pulse, Kyoto Sanga, Oita Trinita, Vegalta Sendai, Ventforet Kofu, Gainare Tottori – 2004–2012, 2014–2021
- Fernando – Avispa Fukuoka – 1998–1999
- Fernando – Kashima Antlers – 2003–2006
- Fernando Andrade – Vissel Kobe – 2012
- Fernando Rech – Yokohama Flügels – 1997
- Ferreyra – Tokyo Verdy – 1992
- Ferrugem – Vissel Kobe, Ventforet Kofu – 2015, 2018
- Flávio – Shonan Bellmare – 2006
- Foguete – Kagoshima United, Ventforet Kofu – 2020–2022
- Foguinho – Vegalta Sendai – 2021–2023
- França – Kashiwa Reysol, Yokohama FC – 2005–2011
- Francismar – Kawasaki Frontale, Tokyo Verdy – 2007–2008
- Freire – Shimizu S-Pulse, Shonan Bellmare, V-Varen Nagasaki, FC Gifu – 2017–2022
- Freitas – Ventforet Kofu – 2001
- Fumagalli – Tokyo Verdy – 1998

=== G ===
- Gabriel – Vissel Kobe – 2006–2007
- **Gabriel** – Yokohama FC, **RB Omiya Ardija** – 2021–
- Gabriel Morbeck – Júbilo Iwata, SC Sagamihara – 2018
- **Gabriel Nascimento** – **Ventforet Kofu** – 2022–
- Gabriel Pimba – Ventforet Kofu – 2012
- Gabriel Pires – FC Osaka – 2022
- Gabriel Xavier – Nagoya Grampus, Hokkaido Consadole Sapporo – 2017–2022
- Galeano – Gamba Osaka – 2003
- Galvão – Sanfrecce Hiroshima, Ventforet Kofu – 2005, 2009
- Garça – Nagoya Grampus – 1992–1994
- Gavião – Júbilo Iwata – 2004
- Geílson – Albirex Niigata – 2003
- Genilson – Kawasaki Frontale – 1999
- Geovani – SC Sagamihara – 2019–2020
- Germano – Cerezo Osaka – 2007–2008
- Gerson Vieira – Renofa Yamaguchi – 2018
- Getúlio – Ventforet Kofu – 2022–2023
- Gil – Tokyo Verdy – 2005
- Gilmar – Cerezo Osaka – 1995–1997
- Gilmar – Tokyo Verdy, Yokohama FC – 2006, 2007
- Gilsinho – Júbilo Iwata, Ventforet Kofu, FC Gifu, Avispa Fukuoka – 2008–2011, 2013–2014, 2015, 2017
- Gilton – Cerezo Osaka, Albirex Niigata, Kashima Antlers – 2008–2010
- Giovani – Cerezo Osaka – 2007
- Gláucio – Avispa Fukuoka – 2006–2007
- Guga – Cerezo Osaka – 1996
- Guilherme – Tonan Maebashi, SC Sagamihara, Esperanza SC – 2018–2022
- Guilherme Almeida – Tokyo Verdy – 2014
- Guilherme Parede – Kashima Antlers – 2024
- Guilherme Santos – Júbilo Iwata – 2018
- Gustavo – Montedio Yamagata – 2007
- Gustavo – Nagoya Grampus, Roasso Kumamoto, Vegalta Sendai – 2014–2017
- Gustavo Nescau – Albirex Niigata – 2023

=== H ===
- Halef Pitbull – Mito HollyHock, ReinMeer Aomori – 2020, 2022
- Harison – Urawa Red Diamonds, Vissel Kobe, Gamba Osaka – 2001–2003
- Haruwiti Ikegami – FC Tokushima – 2022
- Heber Oliveira – FC Tokyo – 2006
- Heberty – Thespa Gunma, Cerezo Osaka, Vegalta Sendai – 2012–2013
- Henik – FC Gifu, Tochigi SC, Renofa Yamaguchi, Tochigi City – 2014–2024
- Henrique – Tokyo Verdy − 1998
- Henrique – Tokyo Verdy – 1999
- Henrique – Júbilo Iwata – 2007–2009
- **Henrique Trevisan** – Oita Trinita, FC Tokyo, **Kyoto Sanga** – 2021–
- Hugo – Tokyo Verdy, Thespa Gunma – 2004, 2015
- Hugo Alcântara – Montedio Yamagata – 2011
- Hugo Almeida – Ventforet Kofu, Roasso Kumamoto, Fagiano Okayama – 2013–2014
- Hulk – Kawasaki Frontale, Hokkaido Consadole Sapporo, Tokyo Verdy – 2005–2008

=== I ===
- **Igor Gabriel** – **Azul Claro Numazu** – 2023–
- Igor Sartori – Kashima Antlers, Ventforet Kofu – 2011, 2022
- Itacaré – Hokkaido Consadole Sapporo – 2007
- Iury – Renofa Yamaguchi – 2020
- Izaias – Yokohama FC – 2006

=== J ===
- Jadílson – Hokkaido Consadole Sapporo – 2002
- Jael – FC Tokyo, Matsumoto Yamaga – 2019–2020
- Jailton – Shonan Bellmare – 1999
- Jaílton Paraíba – Tokyo Verdy – 2019
- Jair – JEF United Chiba, Kashima Antlers – 2013–2014
- Jairo – Kyoto Sanga – 2014
- Jája Silva – FC Tokyo, Sagan Tosu – 2023–2024
- Japa – Cerezo Osaka, FC Osaka – 2006, 2013
- Jean – FC Tokyo, Shonan Bellmare – 2002–2010
- Jean Elias – Cerezo Osaka – 1997
- Jean Moser – Zweigen Kanazawa, Tochigi SC – 2014, 2015
- **Jean Patric** – Cerezo Osaka, **Vissel Kobe** – 2022–
- Jean Patrick – Albirex Niigata – 2017
- Jeci – Kawasaki Frontale – 2012–2014
- Jeferson – Montedio Yamagata – 2000
- Jefferson – Tokyo Verdy – 1999
- Jefferson – Sagan Tosu, Yokohama FC, Fagiano Okayama – 2003–2007
- Jefferson – Roasso Kumamoto – 2013
- Jefferson Baiano – Mito HollyHock, Montedio Yamagata, Zweigen Kanazawa – 2018–2019, 2023
- Jesiel – Kawasaki Frontale – 2019–2025
- Jhonatan – Tochigi SC – 2015
- Jô – Nagoya Grampus – 2018–2020
- João Carlos – Cerezo Osaka – 2002–2003
- João Gabriel – SC Sagamihara, Tochigi City, Kagoshima United – 2017–2021
- João Paulo – Mito HollyHock – 2000
- João Paulo – Albirex Niigata – 2010–2011
- João Sales – Ventforet Kofu, Vegalta Sendai, Yokohama FC – 2008–2010
- João Schmidt – Nagoya Grampus, Kawasaki Frontale – 2019–2023
- João Siqueira – Tiamo Hirakata – 2022
- João Victor – FC Osaka – 2023
- Jonathan Reis – Hokkaido Consadole Sapporo, Albirex Niigata – 2016–2018
- Jonílson – Vegalta Sendai – 2007
- Jorge Wagner – Kashiwa Reysol, Kashima Antlers – 2011–2014
- Jorginho – Nagoya Grampus – 1990–1994
- Jorginho – Kashima Antlers – 1995–1998
- Jorginho – RB Omiya Ardija, Ventforet Kofu – 2000–2003
- Jorginho – Nagoya Grampus, Sanfrecce Hiroshima, Tokushima Vortis, FC Gifu – 2004–2007
- José Alexandre – Kyoto Sanga – 1996
- Josimar – Ventforet Kofu, Ehime FC, Tokyo Verdy – 2006–2012
- Josue – Sagan Tosu, Machida Zelvia – 2007–2009
- Juan Alano – Kashima Antlers, Gamba Osaka – 2020–2025
- Julinho – Hokkaido Consadole Sapporo, Renofa Yamaguchi – 2016–2018
- Júlio César – Tokyo Verdy – 1998
- Julio César Pinheiro – Kyoto Sanga – 2006
- Juninho – Shimizu S-Pulse, Ventforet Kofu, Sagan Tosu, ReinMeer Aomori – 2002–2003, 2017–2018
- Juninho – Kawasaki Frontale, Kashima Antlers – 2003–2013
- **Juninho** – FC Osaka, Kyoto Sanga, **Tochigi SC** – 2015–
- Juninho Fonseca – Tokyo Verdy – 1991–1992
- Júnior – Shonan Bellmare – 1995
- Junior – Kyoto Sanga – 1998
- Junior Coimbra – Sagan Tosu – 2003
- Junior Dutra – Kyoto Sanga, Kashima Antlers – 2010–2012
- Júnior Maranhão – Oita Trinita – 2007
- Júnior Santos – Kashiwa Reysol, Yokohama F. Marinos, Sanfrecce Hiroshima – 2016–2022
- Jussiê – Kashiwa Reysol – 2003
- Jymmy – Shimizu S-Pulse, Tokyo Verdy – 2012

=== K ===
- Kaio – Cerezo Osaka, Yokohama FC – 2008–2013
- Kaique – Thespakusatsu Gunma – 2014–2015
- **Kaique Mafaldo** – V-Varen Nagasaki, RB Omiya Ardija, **Tokushima Vortis** – 2022–
- Kalé – Cerezo Osaka – 1968–1973
- Kanu – Shimizu S-Pulse – 2017
- Katatau – Yokohama FC – 2007
- **Kauã** – **Fujieda MYFC** – 2022–
- **Kauã Diniz** – **RB Omiya Ardija** – 2026–
- Kayke – Yokohama F. Marinos – 2016–2018
- **Kayke Queiroz** – **Kawasaki Frontale** – 2026–
- Kelly – FC Tokyo – 2001–2004
- Kempes – Cerezo Osaka, JEF United Chiba – 2012–2014
- Kerlon – Fujieda MYFC – 2012–2014
- **Kewin** – **Fagiano Okayama** – 2026–
- Kiros – Kyoto Sanga – 2016
- Kléber – Yokohama FC – 2021–2022
- Kleber Romero – Hokkaido Consadole Sapporo – 1999
- Klebinho – Tokyo Verdy – 2019–2021
- Kleiton Domingues – Tokushima Vortis, FC Gifu – 2014

=== L ===
- Lange – Cerezo Osaka, Gamba Osaka – 1987–1992
- Lê – Ventforet Kofu – 2004
- Leandro – RB Omiya Ardija, Montedio Yamagata, Vissel Kobe, Gamba Osaka, Tokyo Verdy – 2005–2008, 2012–2020
- Leandro – Vegalta Sendai, Fukushima United – 2007
- Leandro – Tokyo Verdy – 2008–2009
- Leandro – Kashima Antlers, FC Tokyo – 2017–2023
- Leandro Damião – Kawasaki Frontale – 2019–2023
- Leandro Domingues – Kashiwa Reysol, Nagoya Grampus, Yokohama FC – 2010–2015, 2017–2020
- Leandro Euzébio – RB Omiya Ardija – 2007–2008
- Leandro Love – Vissel Kobe – 2006
- Leandro Oliveira – Thespa Gunma – 2015
- Leandro Pereira – Matsumoto Yamaga, Sanfrecce Hiroshima, Gamba Osaka, Tochigi SC – 2019–2023
- Leandro Perez – Mito HollyHock – 2000
- Leandro Rodrigues – Oita Trinita – 2001
- Leandro Simioni – Yokohama F. Marinos – 2001
- Leandro Vieira – Kyoto Sanga – 2004
- Lenny – Ventforet Kofu – 2013
- **Léo Bahia** – Tonan Maebashi, Zweigen Kanazawa, **Yokohama FC** – 2020, 2023–
- **Léo Ceará** – FC Ryukyu, Yokohama F. Marinos, Cerezo Osaka, **Kashima Antlers** – 2016, 2021–
- **Léo Gaúcho** – **Fagiano Okayama** – 2026–
- Léo Gomes – Júbilo Iwata, Kyoto Sanga – 2024–2025
- Leo Kenta – Roasso Kumamoto – 2021–2022
- Léo Mineiro – FC Gifu, Avispa Fukuoka, Fagiano Okayama, FC Imabari – 2015–2016, 2018–2021
- Léo Paulista – Yokohama F. Marinos – 2002
- Léo Rocha – FC Gifu – 2016
- Léo San – Montedio Yamagata – 2004–2009
- Léo Silva – Albirex Niigata, Kashima Antlers, Nagoya Grampus – 2013–2022
- Leonardo – Kashima Antlers – 1994–1996
- Leonardo – Gainare Tottori, Albirex Niigata, Urawa Red Diamonds – 2018–2020
- Leonardo – Nagoya Grampus, Fujieda MYFC – 2022–2023
- Leonardo Kalil – Albirex Niigata – 2016
- Leozinho – SC Sagamihara, Maruyasu Okazaki, Tochigi City, Esperanza SC, Wyvern FC – 2015–2021
- Lincoln – Avispa Fukuoka, Shonan Bellmare, Thespa Gunma – 2007–2012
- Lincoln – Vissel Kobe – 2021–2024
- Lindomar – Albirex Niigata – 2001
- Lins – Gamba Osaka, Ventforet Kofu, FC Tokyo – 2014–2018
- Lipe Veloso – FC Tokyo – 2017–2018
- Lobão – Cerezo Osaka – 2005–2007
- Lopes Tigrão – Vegalta Sendai, Yokohama F. Marinos – 2006–2008
- Luan – V-Varen Nagasaki – 2020–2021
- **Lucão** – Kagoshima United, Zweigen Kanazawa, Matsumoto Yamaga, **Fagiano Okayama** – 2019–
- Lucão do Break – Shonan Bellmare – 2011
- Lucas Chiaretti – Gamba Osaka – 2006
- Lucas Daubermann – Kataller Toyama, Kochi United, Toyama Shinjo – 2018–2023
- Lucas Gaúcho – Thespa Gunma – 2016
- **Lucas Fernandes** – Hokkaido Consadole Sapporo, **Cerezo Osaka** – 2019–
- Lucas Mineiro – Cerezo Osaka – 2020
- Lucas Morelatto – Iwate Grulla Morioka – 2020–2022
- Lucas Rian – Matsumoto Yamaga – 2023
- Lucas Severino – FC Tokyo, Gamba Osaka – 2004–2013
- Lucas Tavares – SC Sagamihara – 2016
- Luciano – Oita Trinita, Sagan Tosu – 2000–2001
- Luis Alberto – Kashima Antlers – 2014
- Luís Augusto – Yokohama FC, Oita Trinita, Albirex Niigata – 2006–2008
- Luís Henrique – Kataller Toyama – 2022
- Luís Müller – Gamba Osaka – 1992–1993
- Luis Robson – Hokkaido Consadole Sapporo – 2002
- Luiz – Kawasaki Frontale – 2000–2001
- Luiz Carlos – Kyoto Sanga – 1995–1997
- Luizão – Nagoya Grampus – 2005
- Luizinho Vieira – Gamba Osaka – 1999
- Luiz Phellype – FC Tokyo, Shonan Bellmare – 2022, 2024–2025
- **Lukian** – Júbilo Iwata, Avispa Fukuoka, Shonan Bellmare, **Yokohama FC** – 2019–
- Lulinha – Júbilo Iwata, Montedio Yamagata – 2020–2021

=== M ===
- Magno Alves – Oita Trinita, Gamba Osaka – 2004–2007
- Magno Cruz – Cerezo Osaka – 2015
- Magnum – Kawasaki Frontale, Nagoya Grampus – 2006–2010
- Magrão – Tokyo Verdy, Gamba Osaka – 1996–1997
- Magrão – Yokohama F. Marinos – 2005–2006
- Maguinho – Kawasaki Frontale, Yokohama FC – 2019–2021
- Maicon – Montedio Yamagata – 2011
- Maranhão – Ventforet Kofu, Tokyo Verdy – 2008, 2009–2012, 2015
- Marcão – Shimizu S-Pulse – 1993
- Marcão – Kashiwa Reysol – 1998
- Marcão – Kawasaki Frontale – 2006
- Marcel – Vissel Kobe – 2009
- Marcel Sacramento – Albirex Niigata – 2005
- Marcelinho Carioca – Gamba Osaka – 2002
- Marcelo Casemiro – Veroskronos Tsuno – 2020–2022
- Marcelo Labarthe – Ventforet Kofu – 2009
- Marcelo Mabilia – Júbilo Iwata – 1997
- Marcelo Mattos – FC Tokyo, Oita Trinita – 2002
- Marcelo Miguel – Shimizu S-Pulse – 1995–1996
- Marcelo Ramos – Nagoya Grampus, Sanfrecce Hiroshima – 2001–2003
- Marcelo Rosa – Cerezo Osaka – 2001
- **Marcelo Ryan** – Yokohama FC, Sagan Tosu, **FC Tokyo** – 2022–
- Marcelo Soares – Vegalta Sendai – 2009
- **Marcinho** – **Kawasaki Frontale** – 2021–
- Márcio Amoroso – Tokyo Verdy – 1992–1993
- Márcio Araújo – Kashiwa Reysol – 2007
- Márcio Nobre – Kashiwa Reysol – 2003
- Márcio Richardes – Albirex Niigata, Urawa Red Diamonds – 2009–2014
- Marco Antônio – Shimizu S-Pulse – 1992–1993
- Marco Aurélio – Shimizu S-Pulse – 1995
- Marco Brito – Yokohama F. Marinos – 2001
- Marco Tulio – Albirex Niigata – 2000
- **Marco Túlio** – **Kyoto Sanga** – 2024–
- Marcos Antônio – Kashiwa Reysol – 2006
- Marcos Aurélio – Avispa Fukuoka, Kawasaki Frontale – 1998, 2002
- Marcos Aurélio – Shimizu S-Pulse – 2008
- Marcos Guilherme – V-Varen Nagasaki, FC Tokyo – 2023–2025
- Marcos Júnior – Yokohama F. Marinos, Sanfrecce Hiroshima – 2019–2024
- Marcos Paulo – Yokohama FC, Shimizu S-Pulse – 2007–2009
- **Marcus Índio** – FC Imabari, **Nagoya Grampus** – 2022–
- Marcus Vinícius – Honda FC, Albirex Niigata, Kawasaki Frontale, Tokyo Verdy, Yokohama F. Marinos – 2002–2007
- Mário César – Yokohama F. Marinos – 1992
- Marlon – Kawasaki Frontale – 2002
- Marlon – Thespa Gunma – 2006–2007
- Marquem – Vegalta Sendai – 2002–2003
- Marques – Nagoya Grampus, Yokohama F. Marinos – 2003–2007
- Marquinho – Montedio Yamagata, Albirex Niigata, Kawasaki Frontale, Mito HollyHock, Tonan Maebashi – 1997–1998, 2001–2002, 2004–2010
- Marquinhos – Cerezo Osaka – 1994–1996
- Marquinhos – Tokyo Verdy, Yokohama F. Marinos, JEF United Chiba, Shimizu S-Pulse, Kashima Antlers, Vegalta Sendai, Vissel Kobe – 2001–2015
- Marquinhos – Kyoto Sanga – 2003
- Marquinhos Paraná – Júbilo Iwata, Ventforet Kofu – 2007, 2013–2016
- Martinez – Cerezo Osaka – 2009–2011
- Mateus Castro – RB Omiya Ardija, **Nagoya Grampus**, Yokohama F. Marinos – 2014–2023, 2025–
- **Mateus Moraes** – **Yokohama FC** – 2022–
- Matheus – Thespa Gunma – 2016–2017
- **Matheus Bueno** – Shimizu S-Pulse, **Kashima Antlers** – 2025–
- Matheus Ferraz – FC Tokyo – 2014
- **Matheus Índio** – **JEF United Chiba** – 2026–
- **Matheus Jesus** – Gamba Osaka, **V-Varen Nagasaki** – 2018, 2023–
- **Matheus Leiria** – Kataller Toyama, **Mito HollyHock** – 2021–
- **Matheus Peixoto** – **Júbilo Iwata** – 2024–
- **Matheus Pereira** – **Oita Trinita** – 2021–
- Matheus Saldanha – JEF United Chiba – 2021–2022
- **Matheus Sávio** – Kashiwa Reysol, **Urawa Red Diamonds** – 2019–
- **Matheus Thuler** – **Vissel Kobe** – 2022–
- **Matheus Vidotto** – **Tokyo Verdy** – 2020–
- Maurício – Kashiwa Reysol – 2000
- Maurício Antônio – Urawa Red Diamonds – 2017–2021
- Mauricio Salles – RB Omiya Ardija – 2007
- Max Carrasco – Vegalta Sendai – 2011
- Max Sandro – Hokkaido Consadole Sapporo – 2002
- Maykon Douglas – FC Osaka – 2023
- Mazinho – Kashima Antlers, Kawasaki Frontale – 1995–2000
- Mazinho – Vissel Kobe – 2013
- Mazola – Urawa Red Diamonds – 2011
- Mendes – Zweigen Kanazawa, Tochigi SC, Ventforet Kofu, Kyoto Sanga, JEF United Chiba – 2015–2024
- Michael – JEF United Chiba, Albirex Niigata – 2008–2012
- Michel – Yokohama FC – 2024
- Miguel Bianconi – Kamatamare Sanuki – 2016
- Milton Cruz – Tokyo Verdy, Yokohama F. Marinos, Kashima Antlers – 1988–1992
- Milton Júnior – SC Sagamihara – 2019–2020
- Mineiro – Kyoto Sanga – 1997
- Mineiro – Gamba Osaka – 2008
- Mirandinha – Shimizu S-Pulse, Shonan Bellmare – 1992–1994
- Moabe Platini – Oita Trinita, Reilac Shiga – 2006–2007
- Moacir – Tokyo Verdy – 1998
- Moisés Ribeiro – Avispa Fukuoka – 2015
- Müller – Kashiwa Reysol – 1995–1996
- Muriqui – FC Tokyo – 2016

=== N ===
- Nádson – Vegalta Sendai – 2008
- Nasa – Kyoto Sanga, Albirex Niigata – 1999–2000
- Nasa – Yokohama F. Marinos – 2001–2002
- Nathan Ribeiro – Kashiwa Reysol – 2018
- Nelsinho – Kashiwa Reysol – 1993–1995
- Nelson Henrique – Iwaki FC – 2023
- Neto Baiano – JEF United Chiba, Kashiwa Reysol – 2009–2010, 2012
- Neto Potiguar – Albirex Niigata – 2005
- Neto Volpi – Shimizu S-Pulse – 2020
- Nildo – Tokyo Verdy, Hokkaido Consadole Sapporo, Fukushima United, Kagoshima United, Atletico Suzuka – 2014–2015, 2017–2021
- Nilson – Sagan Tosu – 2013
- Nilson – Ventforet Kofu – 2016
- Nílton – Vissel Kobe – 2016–2017
- Nivaldo – Montedio Yamagata, Shonan Bellmare – 2003, 2006

=== O ===
- **Oberdan** – **Fagiano Okayama** – 2026–
- Obina – Matsumoto Yamaga – 2015–2016
- Oscar – Yokohama F. Marinos – 1987–1989
- Oséas – Vissel Kobe, Albirex Niigata – 2002–2004
- Osmar – Oita Trinita – 2006
- Osmar – Avispa Fukuoka, Ehime FC, Mito HollyHock – 2012–2014

=== P ===
- Pablo – Cerezo Osaka – 2015
- Pablo – FC Ryukyu, Kataller Toyama – 2016–2017
- Pablo Diogo – Vegalta Sendai – 2016–2017
- Pará – Vegalta Sendai – 2020
- **Patric** – Kawasaki Frontale, Ventforet Kofu, Gamba Osaka, Sanfrecce Hiroshima, Kyoto Sanga, Nagoya Grampus, **Zweigen Kanazawa** – 2013–
- **Patrick Verhon** – Kawasaki Frontale, FC Imabari, **Oita Trinita** – 2024–
- Patrick Vieira – Yokohama FC – 2013
- Patryck Ferreira - Mito HollyHock - 2026
- Paulão – Hokkaido Consadole Sapporo, Fukushima United, Mito HollyHock, Albirex Niigata, FC Gifu – 2013–2021
- Paulinho – Tokyo Verdy – 1992–1993
- Paulinho – Ventforet Kofu, Gamba Osaka, Oita Trinita – 2010–2013, 2015–2016
- Paulinho – Tochigi SC, Kawasaki Frontale, JEF United Chiba, Shonan Bellmare, Matsumoto Yamaga, Fagiano Okayama – 2010–2023
- Paulinho Bóia – Kyoto Sanga – 2022–2023
- Paulinho Criciúma – Nagoya Grampus – 1991–1992
- Paulinho McLaren – Shonan Bellmare – 1996
- Paulo Baya – Ventforet Kofu – 2021
- Paulo Henrique – JEF United Chiba, Vegalta Sendai – 1999
- Paulo Jamelli – Kashiwa Reysol, Shimizu S-Pulse – 1997, 2004
- Paulo Magino – Kyoto Sanga – 1999
- Paulo Rodrigues – Tokyo Verdy – 1993–1994
- Paulo Silas – Kyoto Sanga – 1998–1999
- Pedrinho – Kawasaki Frontale – 2000
- **Pedro Henrique** – Fujieda MYFC, **Tochigi City** – 2022–
- Pedro Júnior – RB Omiya Ardija, Albirex Niigata, Gamba Osaka, FC Tokyo, Vissel Kobe, Kashima Antlers – 2007–2011, 2014–2018
- Pedro Perotti – FC Tokyo – 2023
- Pedro Raúl – Kashiwa Reysol – 2021
- Pereira – Tokyo Verdy, Hokkaido Consadole Sapporo – 1992–1998
- Pericles – Gamba Osaka, Cerezo Osaka, Sagan Tosu, Gainare Tottori – 1991–1995, 1998–2000, 2003–2004
- Phelipe – Vissel Kobe, Yokohama FC – 2023–2025
- Pingo – Cerezo Osaka – 2006
- Pintado – Cerezo Osaka – 1998
- Pita – Shonan Bellmare, Nagoya Grampus – 1991–1993
- Popó – Kashiwa Reysol, Urawa Red Diamonds, Vissel Kobe – 2008–2012

=== R ===
- Rafael – Oita Trinita – 2006
- Rafael Bastos – Hokkaido Consadole Sapporo – 2009
- **Rafael Costa** – **Tochigi SC** – 2023–
- **Rafael Elias** – **Kyoto Sanga** – 2024–
- Rafael Fefo – Gainare Tottori – 2013
- Rafael Marques – RB Omiya Ardija, Ventforet Kofu – 2009–2010, 2020–2021
- Rafael Ramazotti – Avispa Fukuoka, Gainare Tottori – 2011, 2014
- Rafael Ratão – Albirex Niigata, Cerezo Osaka – 2015, 2025
- Rafael Scheidt – Kawasaki Frontale – 1997
- Rafael Silva – Albirex Niigata, Urawa Red Diamonds – 2014–2017
- Rafinha – Avispa Fukuoka, Thespa Gunma, Gamba Osaka, Yokohama F. Marinos – 2007, 2010–2012, 2014–2016
- Ramón – Hokkaido Consadole Sapporo – 2012
- Ramon – FC Ryukyu, Gainare Tottori – 2019–2021
- Ramon Lopes – Vegalta Sendai, Kashiwa Reysol – 2014–2020
- Ramon Menezes – Tokyo Verdy – 2003
- Ranielli – Avispa Fukuoka – 1999
- Raphael Botti – Vissel Kobe – 2007–2011
- Raphael Macena – Shonan Bellmare – 2012
- Raudnei – Kyoto Sanga – 1996
- Raul Sudati – Azul Claro Numazu – 2023
- Reginaldo – Gamba Osaka, Hokkaido Consadole Sapporo – 2000–2003
- Reginaldo – JEF United Chiba – 2012
- Regis – Kashima Antlers – 1992–1993
- Regis Pitbull – Kyoto Sanga – 2000
- Régis Silva – Nagoya Grampus – 2014
- Reinaldo – Kashiwa Reysol, JEF United Chiba – 2005, 2007–2008
- Reinaldo Alagoano – Vegalta Sendai – 2010
- Renan – Hokkaido Consadole Sapporo, Fukushima United – 2014, 2017
- **Renan** – **Renofa Yamaguchi** – 2018–
- Renan Mota – Kyoto Sanga – 2019–2020
- Renatinho – Kawasaki Frontale – 2008–2010
- Renatinho – Kawasaki Frontale – 2012–2015
- Renato – Yokohama F. Marinos, Kashiwa Reysol – 1989–1993
- Renato Augusto – Shimizu S-Pulse – 2019–2023
- Renato Cajá – Kashima Antlers – 2012
- Renato Vischi – Ventforet Kofu – 2022
- René Santos – Kawasaki Frontale – 2012
- Rhayner – Kawasaki Frontale, Sanfrecce Hiroshima, Yokohama FC – 2017, 2019–2022
- Ricardinho – Nagoya Grampus, Shonan Bellmare, Kawasaki Frontale – 1997–2001
- Ricardinho – Hokkaido Consadole Sapporo – 1999
- Ricardinho – Kashiwa Reysol, Kashima Antlers – 2002–2006
- Ricardinho – Kashiwa Reysol – 2002
- Ricardinho – FC Tokyo – 2010
- Ricardo – Kashima Antlers, Vegalta Sendai, Sanfrecce Hiroshima, Kyoto Sanga – 1998–2006
- Ricardo Graça – Júbilo Iwata – 2022–2025
- Ricardo Lobo – Tochigi SC, Kashiwa Reysol, JEF United Chiba – 2010–2012, 2016
- Ricardo Lopes – JEF United Chiba – 2022
- Ricardo Santos – Cerezo Osaka, Fagiano Okayama – 2016–2018
- Richardson – Kashiwa Reysol – 2019–2021
- Rick – Tokyo Verdy – 2006
- Rinaldo – Gamba Osaka – 1993
- Riuler – Veroskronos Tsuno, Shonan Bellmare, FC Osaka – 2019–2021
- Robert – Hokkaido Consadole Sapporo – 2003
- Robert – Kawasaki Frontale – 2003
- Robert – Kashiwa Reysol – 2003
- Roberto – Avispa Fukuoka, Oita Trinita, Sagan Tosu, Yokohama FC, FC Tokyo – 2004–2012
- Roberto – FC Tokyo – 2011–2013
- Roberval Davino – IEC FC – 1992
- Róbson – Oita Trinita – 2003
- Róbson – Kawasaki Frontale – 2013
- Robson Ponte – Urawa Red Diamonds – 2005–2010
- Rodrigo – Júbilo Iwata – 2008–2010
- Rodrigo Angelotti – Kashiwa Reysol, RB Omiya Ardija, FC Imabari, Kagoshima United – 2021–2025
- Rodrigo Batata – Yokohama Flügels – 1995
- Rodrigo Cabeça – Matsumoto Yamaga, Kataller Toyama, Nankatsu SC, Esperanza SC – 2013, 2017–2021
- Rodrigo Carbone – Kashima Antlers – 1996
- Rodrigo Gral – Júbilo Iwata, Yokohama F. Marinos, RB Omiya Ardija – 2002–2006
- Rodrigo Mancha – Oita Trinita – 2013
- Rodrigo Maranhão – Zweigen Kanazawa – 2018
- Rodrigo Mendes – Kashima Antlers, Oita Trinita – 1996–1997, 2003
- Rodrigo Pimpão – Cerezo Osaka, RB Omiya Ardija – 2011
- Rodrigo Souto – Júbilo Iwata – 2011–2012
- Rodrigo Tiuí – Fukushima United – 2015–2017
- Rodolfo – Montedio Yamagata, Zweigen Kanazawa – 2019–2021
- Roger – Kashiwa Reysol – 2010–2011
- Roger Gaúcho – Albirex Niigata – 2014–2015
- Roger Machado – Vissel Kobe – 2004–2005
- Rogerinho – Vissel Kobe – 2011
- Rogério Corrêa – Shimizu S-Pulse – 2005
- Romarinho – Zweigen Kanazawa – 2016
- Romildo – Nagoya Grampus – 2000
- Rômulo – SC Sagamihara – 2020–2021
- Ronaldão – Shimizu S-Pulse – 1994–1995
- Ronaldo – Yokohama FC – 2014
- Ronaldo – Shimizu S-Pulse – 2021–2023
- Rôni – Yokohama F. Marinos, Gamba Osaka – 2008
- Roni – Sagan Tosu – 2013
- Rony – Albirex Niigata – 2017–2018
- Rudnei – Ventforet Kofu – 2011

=== S ===
- Sabia – Tochigi SC, Matsumoto Yamaga, Machida Zelvia – 2011–2015
- Samir – Avispa Fukuoka – 2012
- Samuel – Sagan Tosu – 2009
- Samuel – Oita Trinita – 2022–2024
- Samuel Alves – SC Sagamihara, Maruyasu Okazaki – 2017–2020
- Sandro – JEF United Chiba, Honda FC, FC Tokyo, Oita Trinita – 1992–2004
- Sandro – JEF United Chiba – 2003–2004
- Sandro – Renofa Yamaguchi – 2020–
- Sandro da Silva – Kashima Antlers – 2003
- Santos – Kashima Antlers, Shimizu S-Pulse, Vissel Kobe, Thespa Gunma – 1992–2001, 2003
- Santos – Shonan Bellmare – 2003
- Saulo – Albirex Niigata – 1999
- Saulo Mineiro – Yokohama FC – 2021–2023
- Schwenck – Vegalta Sendai – 2005
- Sérgio Echigo – Shonan Bellmare – 1972–1974
- Sérgio Manoel – Cerezo Osaka – 1996–1997
- Sérgio Soares – Kyoto Sanga – 1996
- Serginho – Matsumoto Yamaga – 2017–2020
- Serginho Baiano – Oita Trinita – 2007
- Serjão – Albirex Niigata, Avispa Fukuoka – 1999–2003
- Sidiclei – Montedio Yamagata, Kyoto Sanga, Oita Trinita, Vissel Kobe, Gamba Osaka – 1997–2009
- Sidmar – Shimizu S-Pulse, Fujieda MYFC – 1993–1995, 2017
- Silva – Shonan Bellmare – 2002
- Silvinho – Vegalta Sendai, Albirex Niigata, Yokohama FC – 2002–2007, 2010
- Silvinho – Albirex Niigata – 2019–2020
- Sílvio – Renofa Yamaguchi – 2023–2025
- Simão – Shonan Bellmare – 1995–1997
- Souza – Cerezo Osaka – 2016–2020

=== T ===
- Taílson – Gamba Osaka – 1999
- Talles Cunha – SC Sagamihara – 2015
- Tartá – Kashima Antlers – 2011
- Tatico – Okinawa Kariyushi, FC Ryukyu, Giravanz Kitakyushu, Unsommet Iwate Hachimantai, Tonan Maebashi, ReinMeer Aomori, FC Osaka – 2003–2004, 2007–2013
- Tatinho – Ventforet Kofu – 2012
- Tele – Hokkaido Consadole Sapporo, Machida Zelvia – 2012–2013
- **Thales Paula** – Roasso Kumamoto, Nagoya Grampus, **Tokushima Vortis**, Vanraure Hachinohe, Nagano Parceiro – 2021–
- Thalles – Albirex Niigata – 2018
- Thiago – Matsumoto Yamaga – 2012
- Thiago Galhardo – Albirex Niigata – 2017
- Thiago Martinelli – Cerezo Osaka – 2009
- Thiago Martins – Yokohama F Marinos – 2018–2021
- Thiago Neves – Vegalta Sendai – 2006
- Thiago Quirino – Hokkaido Consadole Sapporo, Ventforet Kofu, Shonan Bellmare, Oita Trinita, Kagoshima United – 2009–2016, 2018
- **Thiago Santana** – Shimizu S-Pulse, Urawa Red Diamonds, **V-Varen Nagasaki** – 2021–
- Thiago Silva – Matsumoto Yamaga – 2012
- Thiego – Kyoto Sanga – 2010
- Tiago – Sanfrecce Hiroshima, Fagiano Okayama – 2004, 2011–2012
- Tiago – Nagoya Grampus, FC Gifu – 2013–2014
- Tiago Alves – Shimizu S-Pulse, Sagan Tosu, Gamba Osaka, Fagiano Okayama – 2017, 2019–2023
- Tiago Leonço – JEF United Chiba – 2022
- Tiago Pagnussat – Nagoya Grampus, Cerezo Osaka – 2021–2022
- Tico – Montedio Yamagata – 2005
- Tinga – Kawasaki Frontale – 1999
- Tinga – Júbilo Iwata – 2014
- Tiquinho – SC Sagamihara – 2018
- Toninho – Tokyo Verdy, Hokkaido Consadole Sapporo, Urawa Red Diamonds – 1991–1996
- Toninho – RB Omiya Ardija – 2001–2006
- Toninho Cecílio – Cerezo Osaka – 1994–1995
- Toró – SC Sagamihara – 2014–2016, 2018
- Tozin – Sagan Tosu – 2009, 2012
- Túlio – Oita Trinita – 2005–2006

=== U ===
- Ueslei – Nagoya Grampus, Sanfrecce Hiroshima, Oita Trinita – 2000–2005, 2006–2009

=== V ===
- Vagner – Ventforet Kofu – 2001
- Válber – Yokohama Flügels, Yokohama F. Marinos – 1994, 1997, 1999
- Valci Júnior – Gainare Tottori – 2016
- Valdir Benedito – Kashiwa Reysol – 1995–1997
- Valdney – Kawasaki Frontale, Oita Trinita – 1998, 2000
- Valdo – Nagoya Grampus – 1997–1998
- Valdo – Shonan Bellmare – 2010
- Valdo – Shimizu S-Pulse, V-Varen Nagasaki – 2020–2024
- Vinicius – Vegalta Sendai – 2017
- Vinícius Araújo – Montedio Yamagata, Machida Zelvia, FC Imabari, Sagan Tosu – 2020–2022, 2023–2024
- Vinícius Faria – FC Ryukyu, Atletico Suzuka – 2022–2022
- **Vinícius Gobetti** – Veertien Mie, Fukui United, **Wyvern FC**, Bonbonera Gifu – 2015–
- Vitor Bueno – Cerezo Osaka – 2024–2025
- Vitor Gabriel – Gainare Tottori – 2018–2019

=== W ===
- Wagner – Shonan Bellmare, Tokushima Vortis, Kashiwa Reysol – 1992–1996
- Wágner – Cerezo Osaka – 2001
- Walmerson – Tokyo Verdy – 2019
- Walter – Júbilo Iwata, Honda FC, Hokkaido Consadole Sapporo, Montedio Yamagata – 1993–1999
- Wanderson – Iwate Grulla Morioka – 2020
- Washington – Montedio Yamagata – 2000
- Washington – Cerezo Osaka – 2001
- Washington – Tokyo Verdy, Urawa Red Diamonds – 2005–2007
- Washington – FC Tokyo – 2006
- Washington – Nagoya Grampus, Renofa Yamaguchi – 2017–2018
- Wellington – Avispa Fukuoka, Giravanz Kitakyushu – 2009–2010
- Wellington – Shonan Bellmare, Avispa Fukuoka, Vissel Kobe – 2013–2014, 2015–2019, 2021–2025
- Wellington Rato – V-Varen Nagasaki – 2021
- Wellington Silva – Tokushima Vortis – 2008
- Wellington Silva – Gamba Osaka – 2021–2022
- **Welton** – **Gamba Osaka** – 2024–
- **Werik Popó** – **Fagiano Okayama** – 2025–
- Wescley – Vissel Kobe – 2017–2019
- **Weslley** – SC Sagamihara, Tokyo Verdy, Iwaki FC, **Kagoshima United** – 2013–2016, 2019–
- Weslley – Shonan Bellmare – 2016
- **Weverton** – **Júbilo Iwata** – 2024–
- Will – Hokkaido Consadole Sapporo, Yokohama F. Marinos, Oita Trinita – 2001–2003
- William Alves – Fujieda MYFC – 2007
- William Henrique – Ventforet Kofu – 2015
- William Matheus – Shimizu S-Pulse – 2021
- William Pinheiro – Kyoto Sanga, SP Kyoto – 2008–2009
- William Pottker – Ventforet Kofu – 2013
- Willian – Vegalta Sendai – 2007
- Willian Lira – Ventforet Kofu – 2021–2022
- Willian Popp – Avispa Fukuoka – 2017
- Willian Rocha – Nagoya Grampus – 2018
- Willians Santana – Matsumoto Yamaga – 2015–2016
- Wilson – Vegalta Sendai, Ventforet Kofu – 2012–2017
- Wolnei Caio – Kashiwa Reysol – 1995

=== Y ===
- Yago Pikachu – Shimizu S-Pulse – 2022–2023
- **Yan Matheus** – Yokohama F. Marinos, **Kashima Antlers** – 2022–2025, 2026–
- Yuri – Gainare Tottori – 2019
- Yuri – Tiamo Hirakata – 2022
- **Yuri Lara** – Tochigi SC, Yokohama FC, **Júbilo Iwata** – 2019, 2023–2025, 2026–
- Yuri Mamute – SC Sagamihara – 2020–2021

=== Z ===
- Zé Carlos – Cerezo Osaka – 2005–2007
- Zé Carlos – Gamba Osaka – 2010
- Zé Luís – Tokyo Verdy – 2006–2007
- Zé Luiz – Shonan Bellmare – 1996
- Zé Ricardo – Kawasaki Frontale, Shonan Bellmare – 2024–2025
- Zé Roberto – Kashiwa Reysol – 2004
- Zé Sérgio – Kashiwa Reysol – 1989–1991
- Zico – Kashima Antlers – 1991–1994
- Zinho – Yokohama Flügels – 1995–1997

== Bulgaria ==
- Ahmed Ahmedov – Shimizu S-Pulse – 2025–2026
- Hristo Stoichkov – Kashiwa Reysol – 1998–1999
- Ilian Stoyanov – JEF United Chiba, Sanfrecce Hiroshima, Fagiano Okayama – 2005–2011
- Kiril Metkov – Gamba Osaka – 1993–1994

== Burkina Faso ==
- Bertrand Oubida – FC Ryukyu – 2015
- Dieudonné Minoungou – FC Ryukyu – 2008
- Wilfried Sanou – Urawa Red Diamonds, Kyoto Sanga – 2010, 2012–2013

== Cambodia ==
- Chan Vathanaka – Fujieda MYFC – 2017

== Cameroon ==
- Achille Emaná – Tokushima Vortis – 2016
- **Bertrand Njoh II** – Atsugi Hayabusa, **Esperanza SC** – 2024–
- **Chadrack Makong** – **Blancdieu Hirosaki** – 2026–
- Cyrille Ndongo-Keller – Yokohama Flügels – 1997
- Edwin Ifeanyi – FC Tokyo, Tokyo Verdy, RB Omiya Ardija, Oita Trinita, Montedio Yamagata – 1995–2000
- Jean Marie Dongou – FC Osaka – 2023
- John Mary – Avispa Fukuoka – 2021–2022
- Michel Pensée – Sanfrecce Hiroshima – 2002
- Narcisse Tchoumi - Arte Takasaki – 2003–2004
- Noah Devena Fortune – Tiamo Hirakata – 2022–2023
- Olivier Boumal – Yokohama F. Marinos – 2018
- Patrick Mboma – Gamba Osaka, Tokyo Verdy, Vissel Kobe – 1997–1998, 2003–2005
- Stephen Tataw – Sagan Tosu – 1995–1996

== Canada ==
- Dejan Jaković – Shimizu S-Pulse – 2014–2016
- Issey Nakajima-Farran – Albirex Niigata – 2003
- Kasper Lasia – BTOP Hokkaido – 2024
- Matt Lam – JEF United Chiba – 2011
- Paris Nakajima-Farran – Dezzolla Shimane, Tokyo 23 FC – 2013–2014

== Chile ==
- **Byron Vásquez** – Iwaki FC, Tokyo Verdy, **Machida Zelvia** – 2019–
- Francisco Fernández – Mito Hollyhock – 2003
- Frank Lobos – Mito Hollyhock – 2003

== China ==
=== A ===
- Afrden Asqer – Shimizu S-Pulse, Kashima Antlers – 2017–2018

=== C ===
- Chen Binbin – Kataller Toyama – 2022
- Chen Xiangyu – Kochi United SC – 2020
- Chen Yunhua – Iwate Grulla Morioka – 2018

=== D ===
- **Dilshat Dawutjan** – **Sendai University** – 2026–
- Duan Ju – NKK SC – 1992–1993

=== G ===
- Gao Sheng – Kawasaki Frontale – 1991–1995
- Gao Tianyu – Iwate Grulla Morioka – 2019–2020
- Gao Zhunyi – Kataller Toyama, Avispa Fukuoka – 2014–2015

=== J ===
- Jia Xiuquan – Gamba Osaka – 1992–1993
- Jin Shiming – Gainare Tottori – 2025–2026
- Ju Feng – Ehime FC – 2017

=== L ===
- Li Benjie – Okinawa SV – 2020
- Lü Hongxiang – Kawasaki Frontale, FC Tokyo – 1987–1991
- Lü Xuean – Shonan Bellmare, Iwate Grulla Morioka – 2018

=== M ===
- Ma Lin – NKK SC – 1992
- Ma Shuai – Unsommet Iwate Hachimantai – 2010–2011

=== N ===
- Ning Fangze – FC Imabari – 2024

=== S ===
- Serginho – Kashima Antlers – 2018–2020
- Shen Xiangfu – Kawasaki Frontale – 1988–1991
- Sun Jungang – Giravanz Kitakyushu – 2017

=== T ===
- **Tian Quanhai** – **Kawasaki Frontale** – 2026–
- Tang Yaodong – Tokushima Vortis – 1992

=== W ===
- Wang Baoshan – Tokushima Vortis – 1991–1993
- Wang Jianan – Sagan Tosu – 2020
- Wang Jingbin – Fagiano Okayama – 2016
- Wu Shaocong – Shimizu S-Pulse, Kyoto Sanga – 2018–2019

=== X ===
- Xu Xiaofei – Hokkaido Consadole Sapporo, Kamatamare Sanuki, Gainare Tottori, Mitsubishi Mizushima, Minami Club – 2005–2008, 2012

=== Y ===
- Yang Fan – Iwate Grulla Morioka – 2017
- Yu Shanwen – Iwate Grulla Morioka – 2018

=== Z ===
- **Zhang Aolin** – **Gamba Osaka** – 2023–
- Zhao Dayu – Urawa Red Diamonds – 1988–1990
- Zhao Tianci – YSCC Yokohama – 2018–2019
- Zhou Yuye – Mito HollyHock – 2019

== Chinese Taipei ==
- Huang Tzu-ming – Brew Saga – 2023
- **Liu Hsuan-wei** – Sendai University, Sembonzakura FC, **Tochigi City U25** – 2023–
- Lu Kun-chi – Iwate Grulla Morioka – 2007
- Tsai Yu-hsiang – Brew Saga – 2023

== Colombia ==
- Arley Dinas – Shonan Bellmare – 2001
- César Haydar – Kawasaki Frontale – 2024–2026
- Cristian Nazarit – FC Gifu, Hokkaido Consadole Sapporo – 2014–2015
- Danilson Córdoba – Hokkaido Consadole Sapporo, Nagoya Grampus, Avispa Fukuoka – 2009–2017
- David Mena – Esperanza SC – 2019
- Ever Palacios – Shonan Bellmare, Kashiwa Reysol – 2001–2004
- **Fabián González** – Júbilo Iwata, Ventforet Kofu, **RB Omiya Ardija**– 2021–
- Félix Micolta – Avispa Fukuoka – 2019
- Hámilton Ricard – Shonan Bellmare – 2003
- Hernán Gaviria – Shonan Bellmare – 2001
- James Angulo – Shonan Bellmare – 2001
- **Jeison Quiñones** – **Yokohama F. Marinos** – 2025–
- Julián Estiven Vélez – Vissel Kobe, Tokushima Vortis – 2013–2015
- Jonathan Restrepo – Sagan Tosu, Oita Trinita – 2013–2014
- Nixon Perea – Vegalta Sendai – 1999
- Víctor Ibarbo – Sagan Tosu, V-Varen Nagasaki – 2017–2023
- Walter Espinosa – Nagoya SC – 2023–2025

== Croatia ==
=== A ===
- Alen Stanešić – Cerezo Osaka – 2003
- Andrej Panadić – Nagoya Grampus – 2002–2004

=== B ===
- Branko Hucika – Shonan Bellmare – 2000

=== D ===
- Dario Dabac – Sanfrecce Hiroshima – 2006–2008

=== F ===
- **Filip Uremović** – **Kawasaki Frontale** – 2025–

=== G ===
- Goran Jurić – Yokohama F. Marinos – 2000
- Goran Rubil – Shonan Bellmare – 2005

=== I ===
- Igor Cvitanović – Shimizu S-Pulse – 2002
- Igor Jovićević – Yokohama F. Marinos – 1999

=== J ===
- Josip Barišić – Shonan Bellmare – 2005

=== K ===
- Karlo Bručić – Sagan Tosu – 2019
- Krunoslav Lovrek – Cerezo Osaka – 2004

=== M ===
- Mario Garba – Cerezo Osaka – 2004
- **Matej Jonjić** – Cerezo Osaka, **Tochigi City** – 2017–2020, 2022–2023, 2025–
- Mato Neretljak – RB Omiya Ardija – 2009–2010
- Mihael Mikić – Sanfrecce Hiroshima, Shonan Bellmare – 2009–2017
- Mladen Mladenović – Gamba Osaka – 1996–1997

=== N ===
- Nino Bule – Gamba Osaka – 2000–2001
- Nino Galović – Sagan Tosu – 2019

=== S ===
- Stipe Plazibat – FC Gifu, V-Varen Nagasaki – 2013–2014, 2014–2015
- Stjepan Jukić – Sanfrecce Hiroshima – 2008

=== T ===
- Tomislav Erceg – Sanfrecce Hiroshima – 2002–2003
- Tomislav Marić – Urawa Red Diamonds – 2005

=== V ===
- Vjekoslav Škrinjar – Gamba Osaka – 1995–1996
- Vjeran Simunić – Tokyo Verdy – 1983–1986

== Costa Rica ==
- Danny Carvajal – Tokushima Vortis, Mito HollyHock, FC Ryukyu – 2018–2023
- Giovanni Clunie – Zweigen Kanazawa, ReinMeer Aomori – 2019, 2023
- Kenny Cunningham – Gainare Tottori – 2012
- Paulo Wanchope – FC Tokyo – 2007
- Roy Smith – Gainare Tottori – 2012

== Curaçao ==
- Quenten Martinus – Yokohama F. Marinos, Urawa Red Diamonds, Vegalta Sendai, Montedio Yamagata, Kyoto Sanga – 2016–2023

== Cyprus ==
- Pieros Sotiriou – Sanfrecce Hiroshima – 2022–2024

== Czech Republic ==
- František Mysliveček – JEF United Chiba, Ventforet Kofu, Vegalta Sendai – 1992–1996
- Ivan Hašek – Sanfrecce Hiroshima, JEF United Chiba – 1994–1996
- Ivo Ulich – Vissel Kobe – 2005
- Július Bielik – Sanfrecce Hiroshima – 1991–1992
- Luboš Zákostelský – Hokkaido Consadole Sapporo – 1996
- Martin Hřídel – JEF United Chiba – 1992
- Martin Müller – Vissel Kobe – 2005
- Pavel Černý – Sanfrecce Hiroshima – 1992–1994
- Pavel Horváth – Vissel Kobe – 2004–2006
- Pavel Řehák – JEF United Chiba, Hokkaido Consadole Sapporo, Yokohama FC – 1991–1996, 1999

== Republic of the Congo ==
- **Bevic Moussiti-Oko** – **FC Gifu** – 2025–
- Moké Kajima – FC Ryukyu – 2007–2008

== Democratic Republic of the Congo ==
- Ignace Moleka – Albirex Niigata – 1997–1998
- Kisi Kikuni – Mito HollyHock – 1999–2000

== Denmark ==
- **Alexander Scholz** – Urawa Red Diamonds, **FC Tokyo** – 2021–2024, 2025–
- Brian Steen Nielsen – Urawa Red Diamonds – 1996
- Kasper Junker – Urawa Red Diamonds, Nagoya Grampus – 2021–2025
- Michael Laudrup – Vissel Kobe – 1996–1997
- **Nicolai Vallys** – **FC Tokyo** – 2026–

== Dominican Republic ==
- Luismi Quezada – Tokushima Vortis – 2023
- **Noam Baumann** – SC Sagamihara, **Albirex Niigata** – 2025–

== Ecuador ==
- Carlos Arroyo – YSCC Yokohama – 2023
- José Carabalí – Nagoya Grampus – 2024

== Egypt ==
- Osama Elsamni – Tokyo Verdy, Montedio Yamagata, YSCC Yokohama – 2007–2008, 2011–2016

== El Salvador ==
- Jaime Rodríguez – Yokohama Flügels – 1992–1993

== England ==
- Christopher W. McDonald – YC & AC, Tokyo Club, TRICK Club – 1950–1957
- **Daniel Olaoye** – **Miyajima United** – 2026–
- David Hodgson – Sanfrecce Hiroshima – 1989–1990
- Don Goodman – Sanfrecce Hiroshima – 1998–1999
- Gary Lineker – Nagoya Grampus – 1992–1994
- Jay Bothroyd – Júbilo Iwata, Hokkaido Consadole Sapporo – 2015–2021
- Ian Crook – Sanfrecce Hiroshima – 1997–1998
- Ian Griffiths – Sanfrecce Hiroshima – 1988–1990
- Mark Burke – RB Omiya Ardija – 1999–2000
- Russell Milton – Kashiwa Reysol – 1989
- Ryan Burge – Machida Zelvia – 2009
- Stuart Thurgood – Shimizu S-Pulse – 2000
- Tony Henry – Sanfrecce Hiroshima – 1989–1991

== France ==
- Andrea Blede – JEF United Chiba, Kamatamare Sanuki – 2011–2015
- Bafétimbi Gomis − Kawasaki Frontale − 2023–2024
- Basile Boli – Urawa Red Diamonds – 1996–1997
- Franck Durix – Nagoya Grampus – 1995–1996
- Gérald Passi – Nagoya Grampus – 1995
- **Kévin Le Bras** – **Shibuya City** – 2018–
- Robin Maulun – SC Sagamihara – 2025
- **Sylvain Deslandes** − **Thespa Gunma** − 2026–
- Valère Germain – Sanfrecce Hiroshima – 2025

== French Guiana ==
- Claude Dambury – Gamba Osaka – 1998–2001

== Gabon ==
- Frédéric Bulot – FC Gifu – 2019

== Georgia (Georgia (country)) ==
- Beka Mikeltadze – Montedio Yamagata – 2025
- Davit Mujiri – Sanfrecce Hiroshima – 2011

== Germany ==
- **Aki Koch** - **Machida Zelvia** - 2026–
- Cacau – Cerezo Osaka – 2014–2015
- Dirk Lehmann – Yokohama FC – 2003
- Dirk van der Ven – Yokohama FC – 2003
- Frank Ordenewitz – JEF United Chiba, Vegalta Sendai – 1993–1994, 1996
- Guido Buchwald – Urawa Red Diamonds – 1994–1997
- **Guirone Gueguim** – **Azul Claro Numazu**, **AS Kariya** – 2025–
- Jan-Ole Sievers – FC Gifu – 2019
- **Lennart Moser** – **Fagiano Okayama** – 2026–
- Leonard Brodersen – Mito HollyHock – 2022
- Lukas Podolski – Vissel Kobe – 2017–2019
- Mario Engels – Tokyo Verdy – 2023
- Michael Rummenigge – Urawa Red Diamonds – 1993–1995
- Philipp Max – Gamba Osaka – 2026
- **Philipp Simon Pempeit** – **Vencedor Mie United** – 2026–
- Pierre Littbarski – JEF United Chiba, Vegalta Sendai – 1993–1994, 1996–1997
- Reinhard Stumpf – Vegalta Sendai – 1996
- **Svend Brodersen** – Yokohama FC, Fagiano Okayama, **Kawasaki Frontale** – 2021–
- Tolgay Arslan – Sanfrecce Hiroshima – 2024–2026
- Uwe Bein – Urawa Red Diamonds – 1994–1997
- Uwe Rahn – Urawa Red Diamonds – 1993–1994

== Ghana ==
- Abdul-Aziz Yakubu – Shimizu S-Pulse – 2024
- Abdul Naza Alhassan – Shonan Bellmare – 2008
- Charles Dzisah – Nagoya Grampus – 2008–2009
- Desmond N'Ze – Fujieda MYFC, FC Gifu – 2012–2014
- Emmanuel Oti – Vegalta Sendai – 2021
- Emmanuel Saban Laryea – Ococias Kyoto – 2019
- Francis Cann – Hokkaido Consadole Sapporo – 2024–2026
- James Bissue – Ococias Kyoto – 2022–2023
- Kim Grant – Shonan Bellmare – 2005
- **Kinglord Safo** – **Hokkaido Consadole Sapporo** – 2024–
- **Maxwell Ansah** – Ococias Kyoto, **Ardore Kuwahara** – 2021–
- Michael Quarcoo – Sagan Tosu – 2025
- Michael Tawiah – Vonds Ichihara – 2017
- Michael Yano – Shimizu S-Pulse, Vissel Kobe, Mito HollyHock, Sagan Tosu – 1997–2001
- Mohammed Faisal – Urawa Red Diamonds – 2010
- **Mohammed Lamine** – **Atletico Suzuka** – 2024–
- Owusu Benson – JEF United Chiba – 2000
- Sadam Sulley – FC Ryukyu – 2022–2024
- Selorm Klutse – Kurashiki FC, Ococias Kyoto AC – 2023–2024
- Yakubu Nassam Ibrahim – Ococias Kyoto – 2019–2023
- Simon Afrane Manu – Fukushima United – 2024–

== Greece ==
- Avraam Papadopoulos – Júbilo Iwata – 2016–2017

== Guadeloupe ==
- **Jordan Tell** – **FC Gifu** – 2026–

== Guam ==
- John Matkin – Iwate Grulla Morioka – 2011–2013
- Takumi Ito – SC Ichikawa – 2018–2021

== Guinea ==
- José Kanté – Urawa Red Diamonds – 2023

== Guinea-Bissau ==
- Esmaël Gonçalves – Matsumoto Yamaga – 2019–2020
- Valdu Té – FC Imabari – 2021–2022
- Vladimir Forbs – FC Osaka – 2013

== Haiti ==
- Cédric Toussaint – Iwate Grulla Morioka – 2025
- Frantzety Herard – Vissel Kobe – 2019

== Honduras ==
- Saúl Martínez – RB Omiya Ardija – 2006

== Hong Kong ==
- Au Yeung Yiu Chung – YSCC Yokohama, Iwate Grulla Morioka, Kamatamare Sanuki – 2021–2024
- Leung Yau Wai – Reilac Shiga – 2023
- **To Chun Kiu** – Atletico Suzuka, **Vencedor Mie United** – 2023, 2026–

== Hungary ==
- Bálint Vécsei – Vissel Kobe – 2023

== India ==
- Arata Izumi – Mitsubishi Mizushima – 2006

== Indonesia ==
- Irfan Bachdim – Ventforet Kofu, Hokkaido Consadole Sapporo – 2014–2016
- Justin Hubner – Cerezo Osaka – 2024
- Pratama Arhan – Tokyo Verdy – 2022–2023
- Ricky Yacobi – Gamba Osaka – 1988
- Sandy Walsh – Yokohama F. Marinos – 2025
- Stefano Lilipaly – Hokkaido Consadole Sapporo – 2013

== Iran ==
- Shahab Zahedi – Avispa Fukuoka – 2024–2026

== Iraq ==
- **Baqer Abdul** – **Vencedor Mie** – 2026–

== Ireland (Republic of Ireland) ==
- Ritchie Branagan – SRC Hiroshima – 2018

== Israel ==
- Hassan Hilu – Júbilo Iwata − 2024–2025
- **Neta Lavi** – Gamba Osaka, **Machida Zelvia** – 2023–
- **Dean David** – **Yokohama F. Marinos** – 2025–

== Italy ==
- Cristian Battocchio – Tokushima Vortis – 2021
- Daniele Massaro – Shimizu S-Pulse – 1995–1996
- Giuseppe Zappella – Urawa Red Diamonds – 1998–1999
- Michele Canini – FC Tokyo – 2014–2015
- **Michele Staccioli** – **Ventforet Kofu** – 2026–
- Salvatore Schillaci – Júbilo Iwata – 1994–1997

== Ivory Coast ==
- Adiko Aji – Omiya SC – 2020
- **Badra Ali Camara** – **Gamba Osaka** – 2026–
- Bernard Allou – Nagoya Grampus – 1998
- Donald-Olivier Sié – Nagoya Grampus – 1996
- Hamed Koné – Gainare Tottori – 2008–2011
- **Kouadio-Yves Dabila** – **FC Gifu** – 2026–
- **Sébastien Haller** – **Sanfrecce Hiroshima** – 2026–
- Seydou Doumbia – Kashiwa Reysol, Tokushima Vortis – 2006–2008

== Jamaica ==
- **Norman Campbell** – **V-Varen Nagasaki** – 2026–

== Kenya ==
- Ayub Masika – Vissel Kobe – 2021
- Ismael Dunga – Sagan Tosu, Kamatamare Sanuki – 2021–2022, 2025
- Michael Olunga – Kashiwa Reysol – 2018–2020
- Teddy Akumu – Sagan Tosu – 2023

== Kosovo ==
- Benjamin Kololli – Shimizu S-Pulse – 2021–2023
- Besart Berisha – Sanfrecce Hiroshima – 2018–2019
- **Ibrahim Drešević** – **Machida Zelvia** – 2024–

== Kyrgyzstan ==
- Aydar Mambetaliyev – Ococias Kyoto – 2019

== Latvia ==
- Kristaps Zommers – Nara Club – 2020
- Vitālijs Maksimenko – RB Omiya Ardija – 2020

== Lebanon ==
- Joan Oumari – Sagan Tosu, Vissel Kobe, FC Tokyo – 2018–2022

== Liberia ==
- Lamie Kiawu – Tokyo Verdy – 2000–2001

== Lithuania ==
- Vykintas Slivka – Sagan Tosu – 2024–2026

== Luxembourg ==
- Gerson Rodrigues – Júbilo Iwata – 2019
- Loris Tinelli – YSCC Yokohama – 2022–2023

== Malawi ==
- **Blessings Kanowa** – **Nankatsu SC** – 2025–
- Jabulani Linje – YSCC Yokohama, Shibuya City – 2018–2019, 2021
- **Washali Jaziya** – **Nankatsu SC** – 2025–

== Malaysia ==
- **Dion Cools** – **Cerezo Osaka** – 2025–
- **Hadi Fayyadh** – Fagiano Okayama, Azul Claro Numazu, **Vencedor Mie United** – 2019–2022, 2026–
- Luqman Hakim Shamsudin – YSCC Yokohama – 2024
- Muhammad Khalil – FC Osaka – 2024
- Nazirul Naim – FC Ryukyu – 2013
- Tam Sheang Tsung – Avispa Fukuoka, Kataller Toyama, Gainare Tottori – 2013–2015
- Wan Zack Haikal – FC Ryukyu – 2013–2014

== Mali ==
- Abdol Kader – ASC Hokkaido – 2025–2026

== Mexico ==
- Félix Cruz – Yokohama F. Marinos – 1980–1982
- Francisco Mora – Yokohama F. Marinos – 1980–1981
- Jorge Moralez – Yokohama F. Marinos – 1980–1981

== Moldova ==
- Alexei Koșelev – Júbilo Iwata – 2021–2022

== Montenegro ==
- Anto Drobnjak – Gamba Osaka – 1998–1999
- Boris Tatar – Machida Zelvia – 2017
- Budimir Vujačić – Vissel Kobe – 1997–1998
- Dženan Radončić – Ventforet Kofu, Shimizu S-Pulse, RB Omiya Ardija, Oita Trinita – 2007, 2013–2014
- Filip Scekic – Ococias Kyoto AC – 2024
- Igor Burzanović – Nagoya Grampus – 2009–2011
- Miodrag Božović – Avispa Fukuoka – 1998
- Nenad Maslovar – JEF United Chiba, Avispa Fukuoka – 1994–1999
- Stefan Cadjenovic – Ococias Kyoto AC – 2024
- Stefan Mugoša − Vissel Kobe − 2022–2023
- Željko Petrović – Urawa Red Diamonds – 1997–2000

== Morocco ==
- Abdeljalil Hadda – Yokohama F. Marinos – 2000
- Moestafa El Kabir – Sagan Tosu – 2016

== Mozambique ==
- Simão Mate Junior – Vegalta Sendai – 2019–2021

== Myanmar ==
- **Kaung Zan Mara** – **Machida Zelvia**, **Vanraure Hachinohe** – 2025–

== Nepal ==
- **Milan Thapa** – **Nagoya SC** – 2021–

== Netherlands ==
=== A ===
- Alex Schalk – Urawa Red Diamonds – 2022–2023
- Alfred Nijhuis – Urawa Red Diamonds – 1997–1998
- André Krul – Iwaki FC – 2016
- André Paus – Júbilo Iwata, Kawasaki Frontale – 1994–1996
- Arno van Zwam – Júbilo Iwata – 2000–2003
- Arnold Scholten – JEF United Chiba – 1997–1998

=== B ===
- Bryan Linssen − Urawa Red Diamonds − 2022–2024

=== C ===
- Calvin Jong-a-Pin – Shimizu S-Pulse, Machida Zelvia, Yokohama FC – 2011–2021

=== E ===
- Erik van Rossum – Tokyo Verdy, Albirex Niigata – 1993, 1995

=== G ===
- Gène Hanssen – Tokyo Verdy – 1993
- Gerald Vanenburg – Júbilo Iwata – 1993–1996

=== H ===
- Hans Gillhaus – Gamba Osaka – 1995–1996
- Henny Meijer – Tokyo Verdy – 1993

=== J ===
- Jan Veenhof – RB Omiya Ardija – 1998–2000
- Jeroen Boere – RB Omiya Ardija – 1998–1999
- John van Loen – Sanfrecce Hiroshima – 1995
- Jordy Buijs – V-Varen Nagasaki, Tokushima Vortis, Kyoto Sanga, Fagiano Okayama – 2018–2023
- Lorenzo Ebecilio – Júbilo Iwata – 2019–2020

=== K ===
- Khalid Hamdaoui – Tokyo Verdy – 2001–2002

=== M ===
- Mathieu Boots – Yokohama FC – 2003–2004

=== N ===
- Nick Marsman – Renofa Yamaguchi – 2025

=== P ===
- Patrick Zwaanswijk – Oita Trinita – 2004–2005
- Peter Bosz – JEF United Chiba – 1996–1997, 1999
- Pieter Huistra – Sanfrecce Hiroshima – 1995–1996

=== R ===
- Ralf Seuntjens – FC Imabari – 2022–2023
- Regillio Simons – Kyoto Sanga – 2003
- Richard Witschge – Oita Trinita – 2004
- Ron Jans – Sanfrecce Hiroshima – 1987–1988

=== S ===
- Sander van Gessel – JEF United Chiba – 2011

=== T ===
- Tarik Oulida – Nagoya Grampus, Hokkaido Consadole Sapporo – 1998–2002, 2003
- Thomas Bakker – Veertien Mie – 2017–2018
- **Thomas Ouwejan** – **FC Machida Zelvia** – 2026–

=== Y ===
- **Yuya Ikeshita** – **Thespa Gunma** – 2026–

== New Zealand ==
- Isaac Fitzgerald – Zweigen Kanazawa – 2011
- Kayne Vincent – Cerezo Osaka, Gainare Tottori, FC Gifu – 2007–2008, 2013
- **Marco Lorenz** – **Gainare Tottori** – 2026–
- Michael den Heijer – Kashiwa Reysol – 2014–2015
- Michael McGlinchey – Vegalta Sendai – 2014
- Michael Woud – Kyoto Sanga, Ventforet Kofu – 2022–2023
- Ryan De Vries – FC Gifu – 2018–2020
- Wynton Rufer – JEF United Chiba – 1995–1996

== Nigeria ==
- Adebayo Adigun – Kashiwa Reysol, Tokyo Verdy – 2009–2010
- **Adeola David** – **Ehime FC** – 2026–
- Blessing Eleke – Kashima Antlers – 2022–2023
- Chibueze Christian Simon – Fukushima United – 2021–2022
- **Dayo Olasunkanmi** – **Nara Club** – 2026–
- **Emeka Basil** – **Tiamo Hirakata** – 2021–
- Ganiyu Oseni – Esperanza SC – 2024–2025
- Ikechukwu Eboko – Giravanz Kitakyushu – 2023
- **Jerome Abah** – Veertien Mie, Hatsukaichi FC, SRC Hiroshima, **Bombonera Gifu** – 2023–
- John Bosco – SR Komatsu – 2021–2024
- **Kenneth Otabor** – **Iwate Grulla Morioka**, Tochigi SC – 2021–
- **Lawrence Izuchukwu** – **Tokushima Vortis** – 2025–
- Momodu Mutairu – Kawasaki Frontale, Montedio Yamagata – 1996–1999
- Michael Obiku – Avispa Fukuoka – 1997–1998
- Mikel Agu – Shonan Bellmare, Giravanz Kitakyushu – 2022–2023
- **Onye Ogochukwu** − **YSCC Yokohama** − 2020–
- Origbaajo Ismaila – Fukushima United, Kyoto Sanga, Tochigi SC – 2019–2025
- **Oriola Sunday** – Tokushima Vortis, Vanraure Hachinohe, **RB Omiya Ardija** − 2022–
- Peter Utaka – Shimizu S-Pulse, Sanfrecce Hiroshima, FC Tokyo, Tokushima Vortis, Ventforet Kofu, Kyoto Sanga, Tochigi City – 2015–2026
- **Richard Monday Ubong** – **Vissel Kobe** – 2026–
- **Samuel Abiodun Saanumi** – Tegevajaro Miyazaki, Veroskronos Tsuno, **J-Lease FC** – 2018–
- **Taofiq Jibril** – **Tochigi City** – 2025–

== North Korea ==
=== A ===
- An Byong-jun – Kawasaki Frontale, JEF United Chiba, Zweigen Kanazawa, Roasso Kumamoto – 2013–2018
- An Yong-hak – Albirex Niigata, Nagoya Grampus, RB Omiya Ardija, Kashiwa Reysol, Yokohama FC – 2002–2005, 2010–2012, 2014–2017

=== H ===
- Han Yong-gi – YSCC Yokohama – 2022
- Han Yong-thae – Matsumoto Yamaga, Kagoshima United, Tochigi SC, Iwate Grulla Morioka – 2019–2022
- Hwang Song-su – Júbilo Iwata, Thespa Gunma, Oita Trinita – 2010–2018

=== J ===
- Jong Tae-se – Kawasaki Frontale, Shimizu S-Pulse, Albirex Niigata, Machida Zelvia – 2006–2010, 2015–2022

=== K ===
- Kim Jong-song – FC Korea, Júbilo Iwata, Hokkaido Consadole Sapporo – 1987–1998
- Kim Ki-su – Mito HollyHock, Fukushima United – 2005–2013
- Kim Song-gi – Cerezo Osaka, Vissel Kobe, Mito HollyHock, Machida Zelvia, Fujieda MYFC, Tochigi City, Nara Club, ReinMeer Aomori – 2011–2021
- Kim Song-min – FC Tokyo – 2019–2020
- Kim Song-yong – Kyoto Sanga, Thespa Gunma – 2009–2012

=== M ===
- **Mun In-ju** – Gainare Tottori, **FC Gifu** – 2022–

=== P ===
- Park Ri-ki – FC Ryukyu, Kochi United, FC Osaka, Reilac Shiga – 2015–2021
- **Park Seung-ri** – FC Osaka, Thespa Gunma, **Azul Claro Numazu**, Tochigi City, Veroskronos Tsuno – 2015–

=== R ===
- Ri Han-jae – Sanfrecce Hiroshima, Hokkaido Consadole Sapporo, FC Gifu, Machida Zelvia – 2001–2020
- **Ri Kyong-su** – **Júbilo Iwata** – 2024–
- Ri Yong-jik – Tokushima Vortis, V-Varen Nagasaki, Kamatamare Sanuki, Tokyo Verdy, FC Ryukyu, Iwate Grulla Morioka – 2013–2023
- **Ryang Hyon-ju** – FC Imabari, Yokogawa Musashino, **Veertien Mie** – 2021–
- Ryang Kyu-sa – Tokyo Verdy, Thespa Gunma, Fagiano Okayama – 2000, 2003, 2005–2006
- Ryang Yong-gi – Vegalta Sendai, Sagan Tosu – 2004–2023

=== S ===
- Son Jeong-ryun – Avispa Fukuoka, Renofa Yamaguchi – 2010–2014
- Son Min-chol – FC Ryukyu, FC Korea – 2009–2012

== North Macedonia ==
- Besart Abdurahimi – Cerezo Osaka – 2016
- Blazhe Ilijoski – FC Gifu – 2013
- Boban Babunski – Gamba Osaka – 1996–1998
- David Babunski – Yokohama F. Marinos, RB Omiya Ardija – 2017–2020
- Dorian Babunski – Machida Zelvia, Kagoshima United – 2017–2020
- Goce Sedloski – Vegalta Sendai – 2004
- Nikola Jakimovski – Nagoya Grampus – 2013
- Stevica Ristić – Shonan Bellmare – 2013

== Norway ==
- Fadel Karbon – FC Ryukyu – 2018
- Frode Johnsen – Nagoya Grampus, Shimizu S-Pulse – 2006–2010
- Ibba Laajab – Yokohama FC, RB Omiya Ardija – 2016–2022
- Marius Høibråten – Urawa Red Diamonds – 2023–2025
- Mushaga Bakenga – Tokushima Vortis – 2021–2022
- Ola Solbakken – Urawa Red Diamonds – 2024
- Tarik Elyounoussi – Shonan Bellmare – 2020–2023
- **Tokmac Nguen** – **Tochigi City FC** – 2026–
- Tor Hogne Aarøy – JEF United Chiba – 2011–2012
- Tore Pedersen – Sanfrecce Hiroshima – 1994–1995

== Oman ==
- **Ahmed Ibrahim** – **Vencedor Mie United** – 2026–

== Panama ==
- Alfredo Anderson – RB Omiya Ardija – 2001
- Alfredo Stephens – Shimizu S-Pulse – 2025–2026
- Jorge Dely Valdés – Hokkaido Consadole Sapporo, Cerezo Osaka, Sagan Tosu, RB Omiya Ardija, Kawasaki Frontale – 1993–1998, 2001–2003
- Óscar Linton – FC Imabari – 2021

== Paraguay ==
- Ángel Ortiz – Shonan Bellmare – 2000
- Aureliano Torres – Kyoto Sanga – 2002
- Casiano Delvalle – Shonan Bellmare – 2005
- Daniel Sanabria – Shonan Bellmare, Kyoto Sanga – 2000, 2002
- Derlis Florentín – Mito HollyHock, Hokkaido Consadole Sapporo – 2005
- Francisco Arce – Gamba Osaka – 2003
- Guido Alvarenga – Kawasaki Frontale – 2000
- **Jhonattan Matsuoka** – Nagoya Grampus, SC Sagamihara, ReinMeer Aomori, Kamatamare Sanuki, Fukuyama City, **Aries Tokyo** – 2019–
- Jorge Salinas – JEF United Chiba – 2017–2018
- José Ortigoza – Ventforet Kofu – 2013
- Juan Carlos Villamayor – Avispa Fukuoka – 1998–1999
- Richard Estigarribia – Kyoto Sanga – 2002
- Richart Báez – Avispa Fukuoka – 1996
- Roberto Blanco – JEF United Chiba – 1999
- Roberto Torres – Júbilo Iwata – 1999–2000
- Santiago Salcedo – FC Tokyo – 2005–2006

== Peru ==
- David Soria Yoshinari – Hokkaido Consadole Sapporo – 1996–1997
- Didier La Torre – Fujieda MYFC – 2025–2026
- Erick Noriega – Shimizu S-Pulse, Machida Zelvia – 2020–2021
- Hector Takayama – Sagan Tosu – 1996
- Jorge Hirano – Shonan Bellmare – 1980–1981
- **Kazuyoshi Shimabuku** – **Albirex Niigata**, Fujieda MYFC – 2021–
- Tadashi Ortiz – Tochigi City FC – 2019
- Ismael Montesinos – Shonan Bellmare – 1988–1989
- Jorge Gutti – Shonan Bellmare – 1983–1985
- Alberto Nakaya – Shonan Bellmare – 1980–1981
- Emilio Murakami – Shonan Bellmare – 1980–1981
- Alberto Sone – Shonan Bellmare – 1972–1975
- Carlos Matsuda – Shonan Bellmare – 1972–1975
- Luis Bolivar – Onegay Shimasu – 1995–1996
- Hiro Eda – Shonan Bellmare – 1988–1989

== Philippines ==
- Gabriel Guimarães – Ichikawa SC – 2025–2026
- Ichiro Aoki – Tokai Gakuen University – 2021–2025
- Jefferson Tabinas – Kawasaki Frontale, FC Gifu, Gamba Osaka, Mito HollyHock – 2017–2023
- Kenji Nishioka – Edo All United – 2021–2024
- Lance Ocampo – Nagoya University of Commerce & Business – 2022
- **Nicholas Guimarães** – **Machida Zelvia** – 2026–
- Paul Tabinas – Iwate Grulla Morioka – 2021–2022
- Satoshi Ōtomo – Vegalta Sendai, Sagan Tosu, Yokohama FC, Blaublitz Akita, FC Gifu, Yokogawa Musashino, Tokyo 23 FC – 2000–2005, 2006–2009, 2015–2016, 2019

== Poland ==
- Andrzej Kubica – Urawa Red Diamonds, Oita Trinita – 2000, 2001
- Filip Piszczek – FC Imabari – 2022–2023
- Filip Wichman – YSCC Yokohama – 2017
- **Jakub Słowik** – Vegalta Sendai, FC Tokyo, **Yokohama FC** – 2019–2023, 2025–
- Jakub Świerczok – Nagoya Grampus, RB Omiya Ardija – 2021–2022, 2023–2024
- **Kevin Pytlik** – SC Sagamihara – 2025–
- Krzysztof Kamiński – Júbilo Iwata – 2015–2019
- Maciej Krakowiak – FC Imabari – 2017–2019
- Piotr Sowisz – Kyoto Sanga – 2001
- Piotr Świerczewski – Gamba Osaka – 1999
- Radosław Kamiński – Fujieda MYFC – 2015
- Tomasz Frankowski – Nagoya Grampus – 1996

== Portugal ==
- Alexandre Guedes – Vegalta Sendai, Albirex Niigata – 2020, 2022
- Gonçalo Paciência – Sanfrecce Hiroshima – 2024
- Hugo Vieira – Yokohama F. Marinos, Hokkaido Consadole Sapporo – 2017–2018, 2020
- **Leonardo Rocha** – **JEF United Chiba** – 2026–
- Marco Ferreira – Yokohama Flügels – 1998
- Miguel Simão – Sanfrecce Hiroshima – 2000
- Paulo Futre – Yokohama Flügels – 1998
- Tiago Alves – Montedio Yamagata, Tokyo Verdy – 2022–2024

== Qatar ==
- Ahmed Yasser – Vissel Kobe – 2018–2019
- Emerson Sheik – Hokkaido Consadole Sapporo, Kawasaki Frontale, Urawa Red Diamonds – 2000–2005

== Romania ==
- Cosmin Olăroiu – JEF United Chiba – 2000
- Gabriel Popescu – JEF United Chiba – 2005
- Ovidiu Burcă – JEF United Chiba, Ventforet Kofu – 2000
- Pavel Badea – Shonan Bellmare, Kashiwa Reysol, Avispa Fukuoka – 1998–2001
- Robert Vancea – JEF United Chiba – 1999

== Russia ==
- Akhrik Tsveiba – Gamba Osaka – 1994–1996
- Dmitri Radchenko – Júbilo Iwata – 1999–2000
- Igor Lediakhov – Yokohama Flügels – 1998
- Ippey Shinozuka – Yokohama F. Marinos, RB Omiya Ardija, Kashiwa Reysol, Albirex Niigata – 2017–2023
- Yuriy Nikiforov – Urawa Red Diamonds – 2003–2004

== Scotland ==
- Alan Irvine – Sanfrecce Hiroshima – 1989–1990
- Austin MacPhee – FC Kariya – 2003–2006
- Colin Marshall – Machida Zelvia – 2012
- Lee Baxter – Sanfrecce Hiroshima, Vissel Kobe – 1992–1997
- Scott McGarvey – Sanfrecce Hiroshima – 1990–1992
- Steve Paterson – Tokyo Verdy – 1984–1986
- Steven Tweed – Yokohama FC – 2004–2006

== Senegal ==
- **Ali Krubally** – **Route Eleven** – 2026–
- Cheikh Diamanka – Fujieda MYFC – 2025
- Ibrahima Rene Camara – Júbilo Iwata – 2005

== Serbia ==
=== A ===
- **Aleksandar Čavrić** – **Kashima Antlers** – 2024–
- **Aleksandar Paločević** – **FC Imabari** – 2026–
- Aleksandar Zelenović – Sagan Tosu – 1995
- Aleksandar Živković – Júbilo Iwata – 2000–2003
- Alen Mašović – Machida Zelvia – 2020–2021
- Alen Stevanović – Shonan Bellmare – 2018

=== B ===
- Bratislav Punoševac – Avispa Fukuoka – 2013–2014

=== D ===
- Dragan Dimić – Machida Zelvia – 2011–2012
- Dragan Mrđa – RB Omiya Ardija, Shonan Bellmare – 2014–2017
- Dragan Stojković – Nagoya Grampus – 1994–2001
- Dragiša Binić – Nagoya Grampus, Sagan Tosu – 1994–1995
- Dušan Cvetinović – Yokohama F. Marinos, Tokushima Vortis – 2018–2021
- Dušan Petković – Yokohama F. Marinos – 1997–1998

=== F ===
- Filip Kljajić – RB Omiya Ardija – 2020–2021

=== G ===
- Gojko Kačar – Cerezo Osaka – 2014
- Goran Vasilijević – JEF United Chiba – 1995–1996

=== L ===
- **Lazar Romanić** – **Kawasaki Frontale** – 2025–
- **Luka Radotić** – **V-Varen Nagasaki**, Blaublitz Akita – 2023–

=== M ===
- Miodrag Anđelković – Cerezo Osaka – 2004

=== N ===
- Nebojša Krupniković – Gamba Osaka, JEF United Chiba – 1997–1998, 2006
- Nedeljko Stojišić – Vegalta Sendai, Machida Zelvia – 2021–2023
- Nemanja Kojić – Tokyo Verdy – 2019
- Nemanja Vučićević – FC Tokyo – 2013–2014
- Nenad Đorđević – JEF United Chiba – 2007
- Nenad Živković – Kagoshima United – 2015–2016
- Neško Milovanović – Sanfrecce Hiroshima – 2002
- Nikola Ašćerić – Tokushima Vortis – 2017
- Nikola Vasiljević – Tokushima Vortis – 2017

=== R ===
- Radivoje Manić – Cerezo Osaka – 1998
- Radomir Milosavljević – Kashima Antlers – 2024
- Ranko Despotović – Urawa Red Diamonds – 2011–2013

=== S ===
- Slobodan Dubajić – Vegalta Sendai – 1997–2000
- Srđa Knežević – V-Varen Nagasaki – 2014
- Srđan Baljak – Hokkaido Consadole Sapporo – 2002
- Stefan Šćepović – Machida Zelvia – 2020

=== V ===
- Vlada Avramov – FC Tokyo – 2015

=== Z ===
- Zoltan Sabo – Avispa Fukuoka – 2002
- Zoran Maričić – Sagan Tosu – 1995
- Zoran Milinković – Sagan Tosu – 1995

== Sierra Leone ==
- **Amadou Bakayoko** – **Hokkaido Consadole Sapporo** – 2024–
- **Mohamed Bai Kamara** – **FC Ryukyu** – 2026–

== Singapore ==
- Anders Aplin – Matsumoto Yamaga – 2018
- **Ikhsan Fandi** – **Thespa Gunma** – 2026—

== Slovakia ==
- Jozef Gašpar – Vegalta Sendai – 2004
- Ľubomír Luhový – Urawa Red Diamonds – 1994
- Ľubomír Moravčík – JEF United Chiba – 2002
- Marek Špilár – Nagoya Grampus – 2006–2007
- Miroslav Mentel – Urawa Red Diamonds – 1993–1994

== Slovenia ==
=== A ===
- Alfred Jermaniš – Yokohama Flügels – 1992
- Amir Karić – Gamba Osaka – 1997–1998
- Ante Šimundža – Vegalta Sendai – 1997

=== B ===
- Branko Ilić – Urawa Red Diamonds – 2016

=== D ===
- Davorin Kablar – Cerezo Osaka – 2004
- Denis Halilović – Yokohama FC – 2016

=== K ===
- Klemen Lavrič – RB Omiya Ardija – 2008–2009

=== M ===
- Milan Tučić – Hokkaido Consadole Sapporo – 2021–2023
- Milivoje Novaković – RB Omiya Ardija, Shimizu S-Pulse, Nagoya Grampus – 2012–2015

=== N ===
- Nejc Pečnik – JEF United Chiba, RB Omiya Ardija, Tochigi SC – 2014–2018

=== P ===
- Peter Binkovski – Vegalta Sendai – 1997
- Primož Gliha – Yokohama Flügels – 1992

=== R ===
- Rok Štraus – Yokohama FC – 2015–2016

=== Z ===
- Željko Milinovič – JEF United Chiba – 2001–2004
- Zlatan Ljubijankić – RB Omiya Ardija, Urawa Red Diamonds – 2012–2018

== South Africa ==
- Gordon Gilbert – Kashiwa Reysol – 2007

== South Korea ==
=== A ===
- Ahn Joon-soo – Cerezo Osaka, Kagoshima United – 2016–2020
- Ahn Jung-hwan – Shimizu S-Pulse, Yokohama F. Marinos – 2002–2005
- Ahn Young-kyu – Giravanz Kitakyushu – 2013
- An Hyo-yeon – Yokohama FC – 2009
- An Sun-jin – Mito HollyHock – 2001–2002
- An Yong-woo – Sagan Tosu – 2017–2020

=== B ===
- Bae Chun-suk – Vissel Kobe – 2011–2012
- Bae Dae-won – Tokyo Verdy, Machida Zelvia – 2012–2015
- Bae Hu-min – Yokohama FC, Azul Claro Numazu – 2013–2015
- **Bae Jeong-min** – **Roasso Kumamoto** – 2024–
- Bae Seung-jin – Yokohama FC, Thespa Gunma, Tokushima Vortis – 2007–2012, 2018
- Bae Soo-yong – Gamba Osaka, Giravanz Kitakyushu, Kamatamare Sanuki – 2017–2019
- **Baek In-hwan** – **FC Tokyo**, Zweigen Kanazawa, **Azul Claro Numazu** – 2024–2025, 2026–
- Baek Sung-dong – Júbilo Iwata, Sagan Tosu, V-Varen Nagasaki – 2012–2016
- **Bak Keon-woo** – Sagan Tosu, **Ehime FC** – 2022–
- Byeon Jun-byum – Sanfrecce Hiroshima, Shimizu S-Pulse, Zweigen Kanazawa, Ventforet Kofu – 2014–2018

=== C ===
- Cha Ji-ho – Roasso Kumamoto – 2008–2009
- Cha Young-hwan – Tochigi SC, Zweigen Kanazawa – 2012–2015
- Chang Woe-ryong – Sagan Tosu – 1989
- Cho Byung-kuk – Vegalta Sendai, Júbilo Iwata – 2011–2013
- Cho Dong-geon – Sagan Tosu – 2017–2020
- **Cho Eun-su** – **FC Ryukyu** – 2023–
- Cho Hyeong-in – Reilac Shiga – 2022
- Cho Jae-jin – Gamba Osaka – 2009–2010
- Cho Kwi-jae – Kashiwa Reysol, Urawa Red Diamonds, Vissel Kobe – 1991–1997
- Cho Min-woo – V-Varen Nagasaki – 2013, 2015–2016
- Cho Sung-hwan – Hokkaido Consadole Sapporo – 2009–2010
- Cho Won-hee – RB Omiya Ardija – 2014
- Cho Young-cheol – Yokohama FC, Albirex Niigata, RB Omiya Ardija, Tiamo Hirakata, Tochigi City – 2007–2014, 2020–2022
- Choi Byung-gil – FC Ryukyu – 2017–2018
- Choi Dae-shik – Oita Trinita – 1996–1999
- **Choi Hyun-chan** – **Renofa Yamaguchi** – 2023–
- Choi Ji-hun – Zweigen Kanazawa – 2013–2014
- Choi Joon-gi – Thespa Gunma – 2017
- Choi Jung-han – Oita Trinita – 2009–2014
- Choi Jung-won – Fagiano Okayama – 2018–2020
- Choi Ju-yong – Renofa Yamaguchi – 2015
- Choi Kun-sik – Roasso Kumamoto, Tochigi SC – 2009–2012
- Choi Kyu-baek – V-Varen Nagasaki – 2018–2019
- Choi Moon-sik – Oita Trinita – 2001
- Choi Seung-in – Shonan Bellmare, Zweigen Kanazawa – 2010–2011
- Choi Su-bin – Matsumoto Yamaga – 2012
- Choi Sung-keun – Ventforet Kofu, Sagan Tosu, FC Gifu – 2012–2017
- Choi Sung-kuk – Kashiwa Reysol – 2005
- Choi Sung-yong – Yokohama FC, Thespa Gunma – 2006–2010
- Choi Tae-uk – Shimizu S-Pulse – 2005
- Choi Yong-soo – JEF United Chiba, Kyoto Sanga, Júbilo Iwata – 2001–2005
- **Choi Young-hoon** – **FC Osaka** – 2024–
- Chong Yong-de – Nagoya Grampus, Cerezo Osaka, Yokohama FC, Hokkaido Consadole Sapporo – 2002–2009

=== D ===
- Do Dong-hyun – FC Gifu – 2013–2014

=== G ===
- Gang Yoon-goo – Vissel Kobe, Oita Trinita, Ehime FC – 2013–2015
- Goh Dong-min – Matsumoto Yamaga, Vanraure Hachinohe – 2017–2021
- Gu Sung-yun – Cerezo Osaka, Hokkaido Consadole Sapporo, Kyoto Sanga – 2013–2020, 2023–2025
- Gwak Kyung-keun – Urawa Red Diamonds, Fukushima FC – 1994–1997

=== H ===
- Ha Chang-rae – Nagoya Grampus – 2024
- Ha Dae-sung – FC Tokyo, Nagoya Grampus – 2016
- Ha Seok-ju – Cerezo Osaka, Vissel Kobe – 1998–2000
- Ha Sung-min – Kyoto Sanga – 2017–2018
- Ham Hyun-gi – Oita Trinita – 1993–1994
- Ham Yeong-jun – FC Gifu – 2019–2021
- Han Chang-joo – Kamatamare Sanuki – 2015–2016
- Han Eui-kwon – Fagiano Okayama – 2022–2023
- Han Hee-hoon – Tochigi SC – 2015
- Han Ho-dong – Thespa Gunma, Tonan Maebashi – 2017
- Han Ho-gang – Montedio Yamagata, Blaublitz Akita, Yokohama FC – 2016–2021
- Han Kook-young – Shonan Bellmare, Kashiwa Reysol – 2010–2014
- Han Sang-woon – Júbilo Iwata – 2012
- **Han Seung-gang** – Fukuyama City, **Aries Tokyo** – 2021–
- Han Seung-hyeong – Matsumoto Yamaga, Kataller Toyama, Nara Club – 2016–2018
- Heo Yong-joon – Vegalta Sendai – 2023
- Hong Myung-bo – Shonan Bellmare, Kashiwa Reysol – 1997–2001
- Hong Seok – FC Osaka, FC Tokushima – 2020–2022
- Hong Soon-hak – FC Osaka – 2018
- Hwang Dae-seong – Kyoto Sanga, Tokyo United – 2012–2018
- Hwang Jin-sung – Kyoto Sanga, Fagiano Okayama – 2015
- Hwang Seok-ho – Sanfrecce Hiroshima, Kashima Antlers, Shimizu S-Pulse, Sagan Tosu – 2012–2016, 2018–2023
- Hwang Soon-min – Shonan Bellmare – 2011
- Hwang Sun-hong – Cerezo Osaka, Kashiwa Reysol – 1998–2002
- Hwang Te-song – Kyoto Sanga – 2012–2015
- Hwang Ui-jo – Gamba Osaka – 2017–2019
- Hwangbo Kwan – Oita Trinita – 1996–1997

=== I ===
- Im Dong-hyeon – Gainare Tottori – 2014

=== J ===
- Jang Hyun-soo – FC Tokyo – 2012–2013, 2017–2019
- **Jang Hyun-soo** – **Iwate Grulla Morioka** – 2022–
- Jang Min-gyu – JEF United Chiba, Machida Zelvia – 2020–2024
- Jang Seok-won – Fagiano Okayama – 2017
- Jeon San-hae – FC Gifu, Atletico Suzuka, Kamatamare Sanuki – 2018–2020
- **Jeon Ji-wan** – **FC Ryukyu** – 2023–
- Jeong Chung-geun – Yokohama FC, Fagiano Okayama, Machida Zelvia – 2016–2020
- Jeong Shung-hun – Hokkaido Consadole Sapporo – 2014
- Jo Jin-woo – Matsumoto Yamaga – 2018–2019
- Jo Sung-jin – Roasso Kumamoto, Kamatamare Sanuki, Hokkaido Consadole Sapporo – 2009–2013
- **Joo Hyun-jin** – **Iwaki FC** – 2024–
- Ju Se-jong – Gamba Osaka – 2021–2022
- Jung Han-cheol – Machida Zelvia, YSCC Yokohama, FC Imabari – 2018–2021
- Jung Hoon-sung – V-Varen Nagasaki, Iwate Grulla Morioka – 2013–2015
- Jung Seung-hyun – Sagan Tosu, Kashima Antlers – 2017–2019
- **Jung Sung-ryong** – Kawasaki Frontale, **Fukushima United** – 2016–
- **Jung Woo-young** – Kyoto Sanga, Júbilo Iwata, Vissel Kobe, **Kataller Toyama** – 2011–2015, 2018, 2026–

=== K ===
- **Kang Seong-kook** – **FC Osaka** – 2024–
- Kang Soo-il – Thespa Gunma, Tokyo Verdy – 2017, 2019
- **Kang Sung-chan** – **Ehime FC** – 2024–
- Kim Bo-kyung – Cerezo Osaka, Oita Trinita, Matsumoto Yamaga, Kashiwa Reysol – 2010–2012, 2015, 2017–2019
- Kim Byeom-yong – Montedio Yamagata, Sanfrecce Hiroshima, Shimizu S-Pulse, JEF United Chiba, Renofa Yamaguchi – 2013–2018, 2023–2025
- Kim Byeong-yeon – Roasso Kumamoto – 2014–2015
- Kim Byung-soo – Cosmo Oil Yokkaichi, Oita Trinita – 1993–1997
- Kim Byung-suk – Montedio Yamagata, Sagan Tosu – 2009–2011
- Kim Chan-young – Tonan Maebashi – 2013
- Kim Chang-hun – Oita Trinita – 2012
- Kim Chang-soo – Kashiwa Reysol – 2013–2015
- Kim Chol-ho – Kyoto Sanga, Thespa Gunma – 2017–2018
- Kim Dong-wook – Oita Trinita – 2016
- Kim Dae-eui – JEF United Chiba – 1998
- Kim Do-hoon – Vissel Kobe – 1998–1999
- Kim Do-keun – Tokyo Verdy, Cerezo Osaka – 2000–2001
- Kim Do-kyun – Kyoto Sanga – 2004
- Kim Dong-chan – FC Korea, Mito HollyHock – 2005–2007
- Kim Dong-gwon – FC Gifu, FC Osaka – 2012
- Kim Dong-hee – Giravanz Kitakyushu – 2013
- Kim Dong-hyun – Oita Trinita – 2003
- Kim Dong-sub – Oita Trinita – 2003
- Kim Eun-jung – Vegalta Sendai – 2003
- Kim Geun-chul – Júbilo Iwata, Shonan Bellmare – 2002–2004
- Kim Gun-hee – Hokkaido Consadole Sapporo – 2022–2024
- Kim Ho-nam – Sagan Tosu – 2010
- Kim Hong-yeon – Fukushima United, Iwate Grulla Morioka, Vanraure Hachinohe, Nara Club – 2013–2020
- Kim Hwang-jung – JEF United Chiba, Ventforet Kofu – 1998–2001
- Kim Hyun-hun – JEF United Chiba, Avispa Fukuoka – 2013–2016
- Kim Hyun-seok – Tokyo Verdy – 2000
- Kim Hyun-sung – Shimizu S-Pulse – 2012
- **Kim Hyun-woo** – **Oita Trinita** – 2024–
- Kim Jae-hoan – Hokkaido Consadole Sapporo – 2012
- Kim Jeong-hun – Sagan Tosu, Renaiss Koka, Reilac Shiga – 2006–2009
- Kim Jeong-hyun – Oita Trinita – 2012–2015
- Kim Jeong-seok – Sanfrecce Hiroshima – 2013–2015
- **Kim Jin-hyeon** – **Cerezo Osaka** – 2009–
- Kim Jin-kyu – Júbilo Iwata, Ventforet Kofu, Fagiano Okayama – 2005–2006, 2011, 2016
- Kim Jin-su – Albirex Niigata – 2012–2014
- Kim Jong-min – Tokushima Vortis, Fagiano Okayama, Iwate Grulla Morioka – 2011–2015, 2017, 2022
- Kim Jong-pil – Giravanz Kitakyushu, Tokyo Verdy, Shonan Bellmare, Tokushima Vortis – 2011–2018
- Kim Jung-hyun – FC Gifu – 2012
- Kim Jung-woo – Nagoya Grampus – 2006–2007
- Kim Jung-ya – Gamba Osaka, Sagan Tosu, Vegalta Sendai, Fujieda MYFC – 2011–2021
- Kim Kong-chyong – Fukushima United, FC Merry – 2009–2020
- Kim Kun-hoan – Yokohama F. Marinos, Montedio Yamagata, Sagan Tosu, Albirex Niigata – 2008–2013
- Kim Kwang-min – Fagiano Okayama, Fukushima United – 2008–2009, 2011–2013
- Kim Kyung-jun – Tokushima Vortis – 2015–2016
- Kim Min-hyeok – Sagan Tosu – 2014–2018
- Kim Min-ho – Sagan Tosu, Nagano Parceiro – 2019–2024
- Kim Min-je – Avispa Fukuoka, Ehime FC – 2011–2014
- Kim Min-jun – Shonan Bellmare, Fukushima United – 2019–2020
- **Kim Min-jun** – **Tochigi SC** – 2024–
- Kim Min-kyun – Fagiano Okayama – 2011–2012, 2013
- **Kim Min-tae** – Vegalta Sendai, Hokkaido Consadole Sapporo, Nagoya Grampus, Kashima Antlers, Shonan Bellmare, Shimizu S-Pulse, **Machida Zelvia** – 2015–
- Kim Min-woo – Sagan Tosu – 2010–2016
- Kim Myung-hwi – JEF United Chiba, Ventforet Kofu, Sagawa Express Shiga, Cento Cuore Harima, ALO's Hokuriku, Kataller Toyama, Sagan Tosu – 2000–2001, 2003–2011
- Kim Nam-il – Vissel Kobe, Kyoto Sanga – 2008–2009, 2015
- Kim Sang-woo – Tokushima Vortis – 2006–2007
- Kim Seong-ju – Albirex Niigata, Kataller Toyama – 2012–2014
- **Kim Seung-gyu** – Vissel Kobe, Kashiwa Reysol, **FC Tokyo** – 2016–2022, 2025–
- Kim Seung-yong – Gamba Osaka – 2011
- Kim Shin-young – Cerezo Osaka, Sagan Tosu, Ventforet Kofu, Ehime FC – 2007–2012
- Kim Sun-min – Gainare Tottori – 2011–2012
- Kim Sung-joon – Cerezo Osaka – 2014
- Kim Sung-kil – Oita Trinita – 2002–2003
- **Kim Sung-kon** – **Iwate Grulla Morioka** – 2024–
- **Kim Tae-hyeon** – Vegalta Sendai, Sagan Tosu, **Kashima Antlers** – 2022–
- Kim Tae-woo – Atletico Suzuka – 2021–2023
- Kim Tae-yeon – Vissel Kobe, Ehime FC, Mito HollyHock, Fagiano Okayama, Tokyo Verdy, Roasso Kumamoto – 2006–2011, 2016
- Kim Yeong-gi – Shonan Bellmare, Oita Trinita, Avispa Fukuoka, Nagano Parceiro – 2007–2016
- Kim Yong-gi – Mito HollyHock – 2012–2013
- Kim Yoo-jin – Sagan Tosu, Yokohama FC – 2006, 2011
- Kim Young-gwon – FC Tokyo, RB Omiya Ardija, Gamba Osaka – 2010–2012, 2019–2021
- Kim Young-heon – Zweigen Kanazawa – 2016
- Ko Jeong-woon – Cerezo Osaka – 1997–1998
- Ko Jong-soo – Kyoto Sanga – 2003
- Ko Kyung-joon – Tokyo Verdy – 2015
- Ko Kyung-te – Nagano Parceiro, Iwate Grulla Morioka, Briobecca Urayasu, Yokogawa Musashino – 2014–2022
- **Koh Bong-jo** – **Sagan Tosu** – 2024–
- **Koh Seung-jin** – **Giravanz Kitakyushu** – 2023–
- Koo Bon-hyeok – Montedio Yamagata, Tegevajaro Miyazaki – 2016–2018
- Kwak Hee-ju – FC Tokyo – 2014
- Kwak Tae-hwi – Kyoto Sanga – 2010–2011
- Kweon Han-jin – Kashiwa Reysol, Shonan Bellmare, Thespa Gunma, Roasso Kumamoto – 2011–2015
- Kwon Kyung-won – Gamba Osaka – 2022–2023
- Kwon Seok-geun – Roasso Kumamoto – 2008
- Kwon Young-ho – Fujieda MYFC – 2017
- Kwon Young-jin – Mito HollyHock – 2017
- Kwoun Sun-tae – Kashima Antlers – 2017–2023

=== L ===
- Lee Chang-gang – Fagiano Okayama – 2007–2011
- Lee Chun-soo – RB Omiya Ardija – 2010–2011
- Lee Dae-heon – Sanfrecce Hiroshima, V-Varen Nagasaki, Tochigi SC – 2012–2015
- Lee Do-hyung – FC Imabari – 2020–2022
- Lee Dong-myung – Fagiano Okayama, Oita Trinita – 2010–2012
- Lee Ho – RB Omiya Ardija – 2010
- Lee Ho-seung – Hokkaido Consadole Sapporo, Shonan Bellmare – 2011–2015
- Lee Jae-min – Vissel Kobe – 2010–2011
- Lee Je-seung – Montedio Yamagata – 2016–2017
- Lee Ji-seong – FC Ryukyu – 2020
- Lee Jong-ho – V-Varen Nagasaki – 2019
- Lee Jong-min – Montedio Yamagata, Tochigi SC, Avispa Fukuoka, Matsumoto Yamaga – 2006, 2009, 2010–2012
- Lee Jun-hyeob – Matsumoto Yamaga – 2014–2016
- Lee Jung-soo – Kyoto Sanga, Kashima Antlers – 2009–2010
- Lee Kang-uk – Thespa Gunma – 2016–2017
- Lee Keun-ho – Júbilo Iwata, Gamba Osaka – 2009–2011
- Lee Ki-je – Shimizu S-Pulse – 2012–2014
- Lee Kwang-seon – Vissel Kobe, Avispa Fukuoka – 2012–2015
- Lee Kyung-tae – Fagiano Okayama, FC Ryukyu, Kawasaki Frontale – 2017–2021
- Lee Min-soo – Shonan Bellmare, Shimizu S-Pulse, Tochigi SC, Machida Zelvia – 2012–2015
- Lee Myung-jae – Albirex Niigata – 2014
- Lee Rae-jun – Tochigi SC – 2019
- Lee Sang-min – V-Varen Nagasaki – 2019
- Lee Seung-hee – Nagoya Grampus – 2016
- **Lee Seung-won** – **Nagano Parceiro** – 2024–
- Lee Seung-yeoul – Gamba Osaka – 2012
- Lee Tae-ho – Montedio Yamagata, Tochigi SC, JEF United Chiba, Kamatamare Sanuki – 2013–2017
- Lee Woo-jin – Tokyo Verdy, Júbilo Iwata, Machida Zelvia – 2004–2005, 2010–2012
- Lee Woo-young – Oita Trinita – 1996–1997
- Lee Yong-jae – V-Varen Nagasaki, Kyoto Sanga, Fagiano Okayama – 2014–2021
- **Lee Yoon-sung** – **Sagan Tosu** – 2024–
- Lee Yun-oh – Vegalta Sendai, Fukushima United, Gamba Osaka – 2017–2020
- Lim Jeung-bin – Thespa Gunma – 2016
- Lim Jin-woo – Roasso Kumamoto – 2017–2018
- Lim Seung-gyeom – Nagoya Grampus, Oita Trinita – 2017–2018
- Lim You-hwan – Kyoto Sanga, Albirex Niigata, Tokyo Verdy – 2004–2005, 2015–2016

=== M ===
- Min Seong-jun – Montedio Yamagata – 2020–2021
- Moon Je-chun – Tokyo Verdy – 2005–2006
- Moon Joo-won – Sagan Tosu – 2010
- **Mun Kyung-gun** – **Oita Trinita** – 2017–2021, 2024–

=== N ===
- **Na Sang-ho** – FC Tokyo, **Machida Zelvia** – 2019–2021, 2024–
- Na Sung-soo – Yokohama FC, Kagoshima United – 2012–2018
- Nam Il-woo – Giravanz Kitakyushu – 2013
- Nam Seung-woo – JEF United Chiba – 2013–2014
- Nam Tae-hee − Yokohama F. Marinos − 2023–2024
- Noh Hyung-goo – Roasso Kumamoto – 2013
- Noh Jung-yoon – Sanfrecce Hiroshima, Cerezo Osaka, Avispa Fukuoka – 1993–2002

=== O ===
- Oh Beom-seok – Yokohama FC – 2007
- Oh Chang-hyun – Avispa Fukuoka, V-Varen Nagasaki – 2012–2014
- Oh Jae-suk – Gamba Osaka, FC Tokyo, Nagoya Grampus – 2013–2020
- Oh Jang-eun – FC Tokyo – 2002–2004
- **Oh Se-hun** – Shimizu S-Pulse, **Machida Zelvia** – 2022–
- Oh Seung-hoon – Kyoto Sanga – 2013–2014

=== P ===
- Pak Yong-ho – Sagan Tosu – 1997–2000
- Park Chan-yong – Ehime FC, Renofa Yamaguchi, Kamatamare Sanuki – 2015–2018
- Park Dong-hyuk – Gamba Osaka, Kashiwa Reysol – 2009–2011
- **Park Eui-jeong** – **Kashima Antlers** – 2023–
- Park Gi-dong – FC Gifu – 2010
- Park Hyung-jin – Sanfrecce Hiroshima, Tochigi SC, V-Varen Nagasaki, Fagiano Okayama – 2013–2017
- Park Jeong-su – Yokohama F. Marinos, Kashiwa Reysol, Sagan Tosu – 2018–2020
- Park Ji-sung – Kyoto Sanga – 2000–2003
- Park Jin-soo – Hokkaido Consadole Sapporo – 2010
- Park Jong-jin – JEF United Chiba, Mito HollyHock – 2007–2008
- Park Joo-ho – Mito HollyHock, Kashima Antlers, Júbilo Iwata – 2008–2011
- Park Joon-kyung – FC Gifu – 2009–2010
- Park Ju-sung – Vegalta Sendai – 2009–2012
- **Park Jun-yeong** – **Iwaki FC** – 2024–
- Park Jung-hae – Sagan Tosu – 2008
- Park Jung-soo – Sagan Tosu – 2010
- Park Kang-jo – Kyoto Sanga, Vissel Kobe – 1998–1999, 2003–2012
- Park Kun – Avispa Fukuoka, Nagano Parceiro, Thespa Gunma – 2013–2017
- Park Kun-ha – Kashiwa Reysol – 2000
- Park Kwang-il – Matsumoto Yamaga, Mito HollyHock, Ehime FC – 2013–2016
- Park Kyung-hwan – Shonan Bellmare – 1998
- **Park Se-gi** – **Júbilo Iwata** – 2024–
- **Park Seong-su** – Ehime FC, FC Gifu, **FC Ryukyu** – 2015–2020, 2024–
- **Park Su-bin** – FC Imabari, **Nagano Parceiro** – 2022–
- Park Sung-ho – Vegalta Sendai, Yokohama FC – 2010, 2014
- Park Tae-hong – Yokohama FC, Kataller Toyama – 2011–2015
- Park Tae-hwan – Shonan Bellmare, Verspah Oita – 2016–2018
- Park Won-jae – RB Omiya Ardija – 2009
- **Park Yong-ji** – **Tochigi SC** – 2024–
- Park Yoon-ki – Sanfrecce Hiroshima – 1988

=== R ===
- **Rio Hyon** – **Tokushima Vortis**, Tochigi SC – 2022–
- Ryu Myeong-gi – JEF United Chiba – 2010–2011

=== S ===
- Seo Kwan-soo – FC Gifu – 2009
- Seo Man-hee – FC Korea, Gainare Tottori, Ehime FC – 2007–2009
- Seo Yong-duk – RB Omiya Ardija, FC Tokyo, Kataller Toyama – 2009–2011, 2014
- Shin Won-ho – Gamba Osaka – 2020–2022
- Sin Byung-ho – Yokohama F. Marinos, Mito HollyHock – 2000–2001
- Son Se-hwan – Tokushima Vortis – 2014–2016
- Song Bum-keun – Shonan Bellmare – 2023–2024
- Song Han-ki – Shonan Bellmare, Kamatamare Sanuki – 2011, 2014
- Song In-young – Roasso Kumamoto – 2011
- Song Ju-hun – Albirex Niigata, Mito HollyHock – 2014–2018
- **Song Jun-su** – Reilac Shiga, Ococias Kyoto, **FC Ise-Shima** – 2021–
- Song Young-min – V-Varen Nagasaki, Kamatamare Sanuki – 2017–2019

=== T ===
- Tae Yoon – Vissel Kobe – 2007
- **Taiga Son** – Sagan Tosu, Zweigen Kanazawa, **Ventforet Kofu** – 2021–

=== W ===
- **Won Du-jae** – Avispa Fukuoka, **Shimizu S-Pulse** – 2017–2019, 2026–
- **Woo Sang-ho** – FC Gifu, Ehime FC, Tochigi SC, **FC Osaka** – 2018–2020, 2022–

=== Y ===
- Yang Dong-hyen – Cerezo Osaka – 2018–2019
- Yang Hae-joon – Kataller Toyama – 2013–2014
- Yang Han-been – Cerezo Osaka, Sagan Tosu – 2023–2025
- Yang Sang-jun – Roasso Kumamoto – 2017–2018
- Yeo Hyo-jin – Tochigi SC – 2010
- Yeo Sung-hae – Sagan Tosu, Matsumoto Yamaga, Thespa Gunma – 2010–2014, 2017
- Yeon Jei-min – Kagoshima United – 2019
- Yoo Dae-hyun – Tochigi SC, Machida Zelvia – 2012–2013
- Yoo Hyun – Tochigi SC – 2019
- Yoo Sang-chul – Yokohama F. Marinos, Kashiwa Reysol – 1999–2000, 2002–2004
- Yoon Jong-hwan – Cerezo Osaka, Sagan Tosu – 2000–2002, 2006–2007
- Yoon Jong-min – Japan Soccer College, FC Osaka, Kochi United – 2019–2023
- Yoon Seon-ho – Kamatamare Sanuki, Kochi United – 2017–2018
- Yoon Shin-young – Renofa Yamaguchi – 2016
- Yoon Sung-yeul – Machida Zelvia, Matsumoto Yamaga – 2011–2014
- Yoon Yoong-seung – Mito HollyHock, Thespa Gunma, Vonds Ichihara, Yokogawa Musashino – 2014–2017
- Yu Hyo-jin – Yokohama FC – 2009
- Yu In-soo – FC Tokyo, Avispa Fukuoka – 2016–2019
- **Yu Ye-chan** – **Ehime FC** – 2024–
- Yu Yong-hyeon – Fagiano Okayama, Kochi United – 2019–2022
- Yun Il-lok – Yokohama F. Marinos – 2018–2019
- Yun Suk-young – Kashiwa Reysol – 2017–2020

== Spain ==
=== A ===
- Albert Tomàs – Vissel Kobe − 1998
- Álex Barrera – FC Ryukyu – 2022
- Andrés Iniesta – Vissel Kobe – 2018–2023
- **Arnau Riera** – Nara Club, **Sagan Tosu** – 2022–

=== B ===
- Bojan Krkić – Vissel Kobe – 2021–2022

=== C ===
- Carlitos – Tokyo Verdy – 2017–2018
- Carlos Gutiérrez – Avispa Fukuoka, Tochigi SC, Machida Zelvia, V-Varen Nagasaki – 2020–2023

=== D ===
- **Dani Gómez** – **FC Tokyo** – 2026–
- David Barral – Tokushima Vortis – 2018
- David Concha – Gamba Osaka – 2019
- David Corominas – FC Imabari – 2015
- David Villa – Vissel Kobe – 2019–2020

=== E ===
- **Enric Martínez** – **Azul Claro Numazu** – 2025–

=== F ===
- Fernando Torres – Sagan Tosu – 2018–2019
- Francisco Sandaza – FC Tokyo – 2015–2016

=== I ===
- Isaac Cuenca – Sagan Tosu, Vegalta Sendai – 2019–2021

=== J ===
- Jairo Morillas – V-Varen Nagasaki – 2018–2019
- **Javi Hernández** – **Cerezo Osaka** – 2026–
- Jon Ander Serantes – Avispa Fukuoka, FC Imabari, FC Gifu – 2019–2020, 2023–2026
- Jon Andoni Goikoetxea – Yokohama F. Marinos – 1998
- **Jordi Sánchez** – **Hokkaido Consadole Sapporo** − 2024–
- **José Aurelio Suárez** – Tokushima Vortis, **JEF United Chiba** – 2022–
- Juan Mata – Vissel Kobe – 2023
- Juanma – V-Varen Nagasaki, RB Omiya Ardija, Avispa Fukuoka – 2017–2025
- **Juanpe** – **Gamba Osaka** – 2026–
- Julio Salinas – Yokohama F. Marinos – 1997–1998

=== M ===
- **Marc Vito** – **Nara Club** − 2024–
- Markel Susaeta – Gamba Osaka – 2019–2020
- Miguel Pallardó – V-Varen Nagasaki – 2017

=== O ===
- **Oriol Romeu** – **Avispa Fukuoka** – 2026–
- Osmar – Cerezo Osaka – 2018

=== P ===
- Pablo Maqueda – Avispa Fukuoka – 1997–1998

=== R ===
- Raúl Amarilla – Yokohama Flügels – 1993–1994
- **Rubén Blanco** – **Yokohama F Marinos** – 2026–

=== S ===
- Sergi Samper – Vissel Kobe – 2019–2023
- Sergio Arenas – Atletico Suzuka – 2019–2021
- Sisi – FC Gifu, Tokushima Vortis, Ehime FC – 2017–2020

=== T ===
- Txiki Begiristain – Urawa Red Diamonds – 1997–1999

=== V ===
- Víctor Ibáñez – FC Gifu, SC Sagamihara, Montedio Yamagata, Matsumoto Yamaga – 2017–2024

== Sudan ==
- Mohamed Adam – FC Imabari – 2022

== Suriname ==
- Jay-Roy Grot – Kashiwa Reysol – 2023–2024
- Warner Hahn – Kyoto Sanga – 2023–2024

== Sweden ==
- **Abdelrahman Boudah** – **Albirex Niigata** – 2025–
- David Moberg Karlsson – Urawa Red Diamonds, Tochigi City – 2022–2023, 2025–2026
- Emil Salomonsson – Sanfrecce Hiroshima, Avispa Fukuoka – 2019–2021
- Freddie Ljungberg – Shimizu S-Pulse – 2011–2012
- Isaac Kiese Thelin – Urawa Red Diamonds – 2025–2026
- Jan Jönsson – Sanfrecce Hiroshima, Vissel Kobe – 1993, 1995–1996
- Jean-Paul Vonderburg – Sanfrecce Hiroshima – 1993
- Ludvig Öhman – Nagoya Grampus – 2016
- Robin Simović – Nagoya Grampus, RB Omiya Ardija – 2016–2020
- **Samuel Gustafson** – **Urawa Red Diamonds** – 2024–
- **Tobias Takenaka** – **Edo All United** – 2026–

== Switzerland ==
- Johnny Leoni – Nagano Parceiro, Tochigi SC – 2016–2018
- Nassim Ben Khalifa – Sanfrecce Hiroshima, Avispa Fukuoka – 2022–2026
- Thomas Bickel – Vissel Kobe – 1995–1997

== Syria ==
- Ezequiel Ham – FC Gifu – 2018
- **Pablo Sabbag** – **Cerezo Osaka** – 2026–

== Tajikistan ==
- Vitaliy Parakhnevych – Shonan Bellmare – 2000

== Thailand ==
=== A ===
- Adul Lahsoh – Gainare Tottori – 2008

=== C ===
- Chakkit Laptrakul – Tokushima Vortis – 2019
- Chanapach Buaphan – Nara Club – 2025
- Chanathip Songkrasin – Hokkaido Consadole Sapporo, Kawasaki Frontale – 2017–2023
- Chaowat Veerachat – Cerezo Osaka – 2018, 2022
- Chayathorn Tapsuvanavon – FC Tokyo – 2020

=== D ===
- **Danai Smart** – **Fukushima United Reserves** – 2026–

=== E ===
- Ekanit Panya – Urawa Red Diamonds, Ehime FC – 2023–2024, 2025

=== J ===
- Jakkit Wachpirom – FC Tokyo – 2018
- Jaroensak Wonggorn – Cerezo Osaka – 2025

=== K ===
- Kawin Thamsatchanan – Hokkaido Consadole Sapporo – 2020
- Kiadtiphon Udom – Nara Club – 2024

=== N ===
- **Nanthiphat Chaiman** – **Nara Club** – 2026–
- Natee Thongsookkaew – Gamba Osaka – 1989–1990
- Nattawut Suksum – FC Tokyo – 2019

=== P ===
- Patrik Gustavsson – Nara Club – 2024
- **Peeranat Jantawong** – **Asuka FC** – 2026–
- Phongrawit Jantawong – Cerezo Osaka – 2019
- Poramet Arjvirai – Júbilo Iwata – 2025–2026
- Pricha Suzuki – Asuka FC – 2020

=== S ===
- Sarach Yooyen – Renofa Yamaguchi – 2024
- Sittichok Paso – Kagoshima United, FC Ryukyu – 2017, 2021–2022
- **Siwakorn Ponsan** – **Nara Club** – 2026–
- **Supachok Sarachat** – **Hokkaido Consadole Sapporo** – 2022–

=== T ===
- Tawan Khotrsupho – Cerezo Osaka – 2019
- **Teerapat Pruetong** – **Hokkaido Consadole Sapporo** – 2026–
- Teerasil Dangda – Sanfrecce Hiroshima, Shimizu S-Pulse – 2018, 2020
- **Thanawut Phochai** – **SC Sagamihara** – 2026–
- Thawatchai Inprakhon – Nara Club – 2025
- Theerathon Bunmathan – Vissel Kobe, Yokohama F. Marinos – 2018–2021
- Thitipan Puangchan – Oita Trinita – 2019

=== V ===
- Vorawan Chitavanich – Ehime FC – 1985

=== W ===
- Witthaya Laohakul – Gamba Osaka – 1986–1987

== Timor Leste (Timor-Leste) ==
- Fagio Augusto – Yokogawa Musashino – 2016
- Murilo de Almeida – Oita Trinita, Nagano Parceiro – 2015
- Wellington Rocha – FC Gifu – 2016

== Togo ==
- **Kodjo Aziangbe** – **Yokohama F. Marinos** – 2024–
- Yves Avelete – Nagoya Grampus, FC Osaka – 2024–2026

== Trinidad and Tobago ==
- Silvio Spann – Yokohama FC – 2005

== Tunisia ==
- **Issam Jebali** – **Gamba Osaka** – 2023–
- Lassad Nouioui – FC Tokyo – 2015
- Ziad Tlemçani – Vissel Kobe – 1995–1997

== Turkey ==
- Alpay Özalan – Urawa Red Diamonds – 2004–2005
- **Deniz Hümmet** – Gamba Osaka – 2025–
- Eren Albayrak – Júbilo Iwata – 2018–2019
- Fuat Usta – RB Omiya Ardija – 2002
- İlhan Mansız – Vissel Kobe – 2004
- Mesut Sayili – FC Kariya – 2013
- Ömer Tokaç – Shonan Bellmare, Fukushima United, Tochigi SC – 2019–2022

== Ukraine ==
- Oleh Protasov – Gamba Osaka – 1994–1996
- Serhiy Skachenko – Sanfrecce Hiroshima – 2001

== United Arab Emirates ==
- Caio Lucas – Kashima Antlers – 2014–2016

== United States ==
- Andrew Fitzpatrick – Okinawa SV – 2019
- Ansger Otto – Gainare Tottori – 2013
- Brian Waltrip – Laranja Kyoto – 2010–2012
- **Cal Jennings** – **FC Ryukyu** – 2026–
- Coltrane Lobreglio – Fukushima United Reserves – 2024
- Dan Calichman – Sanfrecce Hiroshima – 1990–1993
- **Elijah Whipp** – **Okinawa SV** – 2026–
- **Jelani Reshaun Sumiyoshi** – **Shimizu S-Pulse** – 2024–
- **Johnny Angelini** – **FC Osaka** – 2025–
- Joshua Graves – RKU FC - 2010
- Kojo Dadzie – Gainare Tottori – 2025–2026
- Mobi Fehr – Tokyo Verdy, SC Sagamihara – 2010–2012, 2014–2015
- Oliver Wellman – Reilac Shiga, Laranja Kyoto – 2009–2011
- Piakai Henkel – Fagiano Okayama – 2013–2014
- **Ray Takada** – Rovers Kisarazu, **FC Tokushima** – 2022–
- **Rylan Swanson** – **Okinawa SV** – 2026–
- Steven Lenhart – FC Imabari – 2017
- Tom Byer – Kashiwa Reysol – 1986–1987

== Uruguay ==
- Adolfo Barán – Hokkaido Consadole Sapporo – 1992–1993
- Álvaro Peña – Montedio Yamagata – 2013
- Diego Forlán – Cerezo Osaka – 2013–2014
- Eduardo Acevedo – Hokkaido Consadole Sapporo – 1992
- Fernando Picun – Urawa Red Diamonds – 1999–2000
- Gonzalo González – Albirex Niigata – 2020–2021
- Johnny Miqueiro – Sagan Tosu – 1993–1994
- Marcelo Lipatín – Yokohama F. Marinos – 2001
- Mario López – Hokkaido Consadole Sapporo, Kyoto Sanga, Ventforet Kofu, Sagan Tosu – 1990–1997
- Pedro Manzi – Albirex Niigata – 2020
- Pedro Pedrucci – Hokkaido Consadole Sapporo – 1990–1992, 1993–1995
- Raul Otero – Hokkaido Consadole Sapporo – 1996
- Renzo López – Kyoto Sanga, Sagan Tosu – 2018, 2020
- Santiago Ostolaza – Kyoto Sanga – 1994

== Uzbekistan ==
- Dostonbek Tursunov – Renofa Yamaguchi – 2019
- Fozil Musaev – Júbilo Iwata – 2017–2021
- Oleg Pashinin – Sanfrecce Hiroshima – 2001
- Zabikhillo Urinboev – Tokushima Vortis – 2019–2020

== Venezuela ==
- **Ronaldo Rivas** – **FC Tiamo Hirakata** – 2026—
- Williams Velásquez – JEF United Chiba – 2019

== Vietnam ==
- Bùi Ngọc Long – Azul Claro Numazu – 2022
- Đặng Văn Lâm – Cerezo Osaka – 2021–2022
- Lê Công Vinh – Hokkaido Consadole Sapporo – 2013
- Nguyễn Công Phượng – Mito Hollyhock, Yokohama FC – 2016, 2023–2024
- Nguyễn Ngọc Hậu – Azul Claro Numazu – 2022
- Nguyễn Tuấn Anh – Yokohama FC – 2016
- Nguyễn Văn Sơn – Azul Claro Numazu – 2022
- Phạm Văn Luân – FC Ryukyu – 2022
- Rafaelson – Vegalta Sendai – 2018
- Vũ Hồng Quân – FC Ryukyu – 2022

== Wales ==
- Mark Bowen – Shimizu S-Pulse – 1997

== See also ==
- List of Japan international footballers born outside Japan

== References and notes ==
Notes

1. Born in Afghanistan
2. Born in Albania
3. Born in Algeria
4. Born in American Samoa
5. Born in Andorra
6. Born in Angola
7. Born in Anguilla
8. Born in Antigua and Barbuda
9. Born in Argentina
10. Born in Armenia
11. Born in Aruba
12. Born in Australia
13. Born in Austria
14. Born in Azerbaijan
15. Born in Bahamas
16. Born in Bahrain
17. Born in Bangladesh
18. Born in Barbados
19. Born in Belarus
20. Born in Belgium
21. Born in Belize
22. Born in Benin
23. Born in Bermuda
24. Born in Bhutan
25. Born in Bolivia
26. Born in Bosnia and Herzegovina
27. Born in Botswana
28. Born in Brazil
29. Born in British Virgin Islands
30. Born in Brunei
31. Born in Bulgaria
32. Born in Burkina Faso
33. Born in Burundi
34. Born in Cambodia
35. Born in Cameroon
36. Born in Canada
37. Born in Cape Verde
38. Born in Cayman Islands
39. Born in Central African Republic
40. Born in Chad
41. Born in Chile
42. Born in China
43. Born in Chinese Taipei
44. Born in Colombia
45. Born in Comoros
46. Born in Congo
47. Born in Cook Islands
48. Born in Costa Rica
49. Born in Croatia (then part of SFR Yugoslavia)
50. Born in Cuba
51. Born in Curaçao
52. Born in Cyprus
53. Born in Czech Republic (then part of the Czechoslovakia)
54. Born in England
55. Born in France
56. Born in Germany
57. Born in Ghana
58. Born in Indonesia
59. Born in Italy
60. Born in Ivory Coast
61. Born in Jamaica
62. Born in Japan
63. Born in Kenya
64. Born in Kosovo (then part of SFR Yugoslavia)
65. Born in Kosovo (then part of Kingdom of Yugoslavia)
66. Born in Morocco
67. Born in Netherlands
68. Born in Nigeria
69. Born in Poland
70. Born in Portugal
71. Born in Russia
72. Born in Serbia (then part of SFR Yugoslavia)
73. Born in South Africa
74. Born in South Korea
75. Born in Spain
76. Born in Sweden
77. Born in Switzerland
78. Born in Tunisia
79. Born in Ukraine
80. Born in United States
81. Born in Uruguay
82. Capped for the Brazil national football team
83. Capped for the Brazil national under-23 football team
84. Capped for the Brazil national under-21 football team
85. Capped for the Brazil national under-20 football team
86. Capped for the Brazil national under-19 football team
87. Capped for the Brazil national under-18 football team
88. Capped for the Brazil national under-17 football team
89. Capped for the Brazil national under-16 football team
90. Capped for the CIS national football team
91. Capped for the France national football team
92. Capped for the France national football B team
93. Capped for the France national under-21 football team
94. Capped for the France national under-20 football team
95. Capped for the France national under-19 football team
96. Capped for the France national under-18 football team
97. Capped for the France national under-17 football team
98. Capped for the France national under-16 football team
99. Capped for the Japan national football team
100. Capped for the Japan national under-23 football team
101. Capped for the Netherlands national under-19 football team
102. Capped for the Netherlands national under-17 football team
103. Capped for the Portugal national under-17 football team
104. Capped for the Singapore national under-21 football team
105. Capped for the Soviet Union national football team
106. Capped for the Soviet Union Olympic football team
107. Capped for the Spain national under-17 football team
108. Capped for the Spain national under-16 football team
109. Capped for the Sweden men's national under-19 football team
110. Capped for the Sweden men's national under-17 football team
111. Capped for the Tajikistan national football team
112. Capped for the Ukraine national football team
