= 2003 Shonan Bellmare season =

Shonan Bellmare
2003 season
- Manager: Samir; Matsuichi Yamada
- Stadium: Hiratsuka Athletics Stadium
- J. League 2: 10th
- Emperor's Cup: 4th Round
- Top goalscorer: Takayoshi Toda (5)
Home colours	Away colours

2003 Shonan Bellmare season

== Competitions ==
Competitions	Position
J. League 2	10th / 12 clubs
Emperor's Cup	4th Round

== Domestic results ==
=== J. League 2 ===
Match	Date	Venue	Opponents	Score
1	2003.3.15	Hiratsuka Athletics Stadium	Montedio Yamagata	2-0
2	2003.3.22	Todoroki Athletics Stadium	Kawasaki Frontale	1-2
3	2003.3.29	Kose Sports Stadium	Ventforet Kofu	0-1
4	2003.4.5	Hiratsuka Athletics Stadium	Sanfrecce Hiroshima	0-1
5	2003.4.9	Hiratsuka Athletics Stadium	Sagan Tosu	2-1
6	2003.4.12	Hitachinaka (ja:ひたちなか市総合運動公園陸上競技場)	Mito HollyHock	0-1
7	2003.4.20	Hiratsuka Athletics Stadium	Albirex Niigata	1-2
8	2003.4.26	Mitsuzawa Stadium	Yokohama F.C.	0-2
9	2003.4.29	Hiratsuka Athletics Stadium	Avispa Fukuoka	1-2
10	2003.5.4	Ōmiya Park Soccer Stadium	Omiya Ardija	0-0
11	2003.5.10	Hiratsuka Athletics Stadium	Consadole Sapporo	0-2
12	2003.5.14	Yamagata Park Stadium	Montedio Yamagata	2-0
13	2003.5.17	Hiratsuka Athletics Stadium	Kawasaki Frontale	0-4
14	2003.5.24	Hiratsuka Athletics Stadium	Ventforet Kofu	0-3
15	2003.5.31	Hiroshima Big Arch	Sanfrecce Hiroshima	0-0
16	2003.6.7	Hiratsuka Athletics Stadium	Omiya Ardija	0-0
17	2003.6.14	Sapporo Atsubetsu Park Stadium	Consadole Sapporo	1-1
18	2003.6.18	Hiratsuka Athletics Stadium	Yokohama F.C.	1-1
19	2003.6.21	Niigata Stadium	Albirex Niigata	0-1
20	2003.6.28	Hiratsuka Athletics Stadium	Mito HollyHock	1-0
21	2003.7.2	Tosu Stadium	Sagan Tosu	0-0
22	2003.7.5	Hakata no mori stadium	Avispa Fukuoka	0-2
23	2003.7.19	Hiratsuka Athletics Stadium	Consadole Sapporo	0-2
24	2003.7.26	Todoroki Athletics Stadium	Kawasaki Frontale	1-2
25	2003.7.30	Hiratsuka Athletics Stadium	Montedio Yamagata	3-0
26	2003.8.2	Hiratsuka Athletics Stadium	Sanfrecce Hiroshima	1-0
27	2003.8.10	Ōmiya Park Soccer Stadium	Omiya Ardija	2-2
28	2003.8.16	Hiratsuka Athletics Stadium	Albirex Niigata	0-0
29	2003.8.23	Kasamatsu Stadium	Mito HollyHock	2-1
30	2003.8.30	Hiratsuka Athletics Stadium	Sagan Tosu	2-1
31	2003.9.3	Mitsuzawa Stadium	Yokohama F.C.	0-1
32	2003.9.6	Hiratsuka Athletics Stadium	Avispa Fukuoka	0-3
33	2003.9.13	Kose Sports Stadium	Ventforet Kofu	0-2
34	2003.9.20	Niigata Stadium	Albirex Niigata	1-2
35	2003.9.23	Hiratsuka Athletics Stadium	Mito HollyHock	0-1
36	2003.9.27	Sapporo Dome	Consadole Sapporo	2-1
37	2003.10.4	Hiratsuka Athletics Stadium	Yokohama F.C.	1-0
38	2003.10.13	Hakatanomori Athletic Stadium	Avispa Fukuoka	0-1
39	2003.10.17	Hiratsuka Athletics Stadium	Omiya Ardija	2-0
40	2003.10.26	Tosu Stadium	Sagan Tosu	0-0
41	2003.11.1	Hiroshima Stadium	Sanfrecce Hiroshima	0-3
42	2003.11.8	Hiratsuka Athletics Stadium	Ventforet Kofu	2-2
43	2003.11.15	Hiratsuka Athletics Stadium	Kawasaki Frontale	2-2
44	2003.11.23	Yamagata Park Stadium	Montedio Yamagata	0-1

=== Emperor's Cup ===
Match	Date	Venue	Opponents	Score
1st Round	2003..	[[]]	[[]]	-
2nd Round	2003..	[[]]	[[]]	-
3rd Round	2003..	[[]]	[[]]	-
4th Round	2003..	[[]]	[[]]	-

== Player statistics ==
No.	Pos.	Player	D.o.B. (Age)	Height / Weight	J. League 2		Emperor's Cup		Total	
No.	Pos.	Player	D.o.B. (Age)	Height / Weight	Apps	Goals	Apps	Goals	Apps	Goals
1	GK	Masahito Suzuki	April 28, 1977 (aged 25)	cm / kg	24	0				
2	DF	Osamu Umeyama	August 16, 1973 (aged 29)	cm / kg	35	0				
3	DF	Yasuhide Ihara	March 8, 1973 (aged 30)	cm / kg	18	2				
4	DF	Yu Tokisaki	June 15, 1979 (aged 23)	cm / kg	33	1				
5	DF	Hiroyuki Shirai	June 17, 1974 (aged 28)	cm / kg	30	2				
6	MF	Koji Nakazato	April 24, 1982 (aged 20)	cm / kg	29	2				
7	MF	Yoshikazu Suzuki	June 1, 1982 (aged 20)	cm / kg	13	0				
8	MF	Shingo Kumabayashi	June 23, 1981 (aged 21)	cm / kg	37	1				
9	FW	Yasunori Takada	February 22, 1979 (aged 24)	cm / kg	39	3				
10	MF	Tomoyuki Yoshino	July 9, 1980 (aged 22)	cm / kg	40	0				
11	MF	Koji Sakamoto	December 3, 1978 (aged 24)	cm / kg	44	4				
13	DF	Takayoshi Toda	December 8, 1979 (aged 23)	cm / kg	26	5				
14	FW	Yuki Ishida	November 4, 1980 (aged 22)	cm / kg	19	0				
15	DF	Ever Palacios	January 18, 1969 (aged 34)	cm / kg	28	1				
16	GK	Hiroki Kobayashi	May 24, 1977 (aged 25)	cm / kg	21	0				
17	DF	Tsutomu Kitade	September 18, 1978 (aged 24)	cm / kg	15	0				
18	MF	Daishi Kato	July 26, 1983 (aged 19)	cm / kg	31	1				
19	FW	Naoki Ishihara	August 14, 1984 (aged 18)	cm / kg	17	2				
20	MF	Kazuhiko Tanabe	June 3, 1981 (aged 21)	cm / kg	6	0				
21	GK	Yuya Funatsu	November 22, 1983 (aged 19)	cm / kg	0	0				
22	MF	Yoshihide Nishikawa	April 10, 1978 (aged 24)	cm / kg	10	1				
23	DF	Kei Sugimoto	June 4, 1982 (aged 20)	cm / kg	0	0				
24	DF	Takanori Nakajima	February 9, 1984 (aged 19)	cm / kg	0	0				
25	DF	Atsushi Terui	July 19, 1980 (aged 22)	cm / kg	4	0				
26	MF	Santos	April 9, 1983 (aged 19)	cm / kg	1	0				
27	DF	Manabu Ikeda	July 3, 1980 (aged 22)	cm / kg	13	0				
28	FW	Hamilton Ricard	January 12, 1974 (aged 29)	cm / kg	12	2				
29	MF	Kim Geun-Chol	June 24, 1983 (aged 19)	cm / kg	41	1				
32	FW	Michiaki Kakimoto	October 6, 1977 (aged 25)	cm / kg	22	3				

== Other pages ==
- (in Japanese) J. League official site
