= 2002 J.League Division 2 =

J.League Division 2
- Season: 2002
- Champions: Oita Trinita; 1st J2 title 1st D2 title
- Promoted: Oita Trinita; Cerezo Osaka
- Matches: 264
- Goals: 671 (2.54 per match)
- Top goalscorer: Marcus Vinícius (19 goals)
- Highest attendance: 42,211; Albirex Niigata 0-0 Cerezo Osaka (10 August 2002)
- Lowest attendance: 1,136; Mito HollyHock 0-2 Sagan Tosu (7 August 2002)
- Total attendance: 1,806,392
- Average attendance: 6,842

The 2002 J.League Division 2 season was the 31st season of the second-tier club football in Japan and the 4th season since the establishment of J.League Division 2.

Starting this season, extra-time rule was abolished and the league adopted the traditional 3-1-0 points system. The twelve clubs competed in the quadruple round-robin format. The top two received promotion to the J.League Division 1. There were no relegation to the third-tier Japan Football League.

== Clubs ==
Locations of the 2002 J.League 2 teams

The following 12 clubs played in J.League Division 2 during 2002 season. Of these clubs, Cerezo Osaka and Avispa Fukuoka were relegated from J.League Division 1 last year.

- Albirex Niigata
- Avispa Fukuoka
- Cerezo Osaka
- Kawasaki Frontale
- Mito HollyHock
- Montedio Yamagata
- Oita Trinita
- Omiya Ardija
- Sagan Tosu
- Shonan Bellmare
- Ventforet Kofu
- Yokohama FC

=== Personnel ===
Club	Head coach
Albirex Niigata	(Japan) Yasuharu Sorimachi
Avispa Fukuoka	(Japan) Shigekazu Nakamura
Cerezo Osaka	(Japan) Akihiro Nishimura
Kawasaki Frontale	(Japan) Nobuhiro Ishizaki
Mito HollyHock	(Japan) Masaaki Kanno
Montedio Yamagata	(Japan) Koichi Hashiratani
Oita Trinita	(Japan) Shinji Kobayashi
Omiya Ardija	(Netherlands) Henk Duut
Sagan Tosu	(Japan) Hiroshi Soejima
Shonan Bellmare	(Japan) Koji Tanaka
Ventforet Kofu	(Japan) Takeshi Oki
Yokohama FC	(Japan) Katsuyoshi Shinto

=== Foreign players ===
Club	Player 1	Player 2	Player 3	Non-visa foreign	Type-C contract	Former players
Albirex Niigata	(Brazil) Beto	(Brazil) Marcus Vinícius	(Brazil) Serjão	(North Korea) An Yong-hak		
Avispa Fukuoka	(Bosnia and Herzegovina) Alen Avdić	(Federal Republic of Yugoslavia) Zoltan Sabo	(South Korea) Noh Jung-yoon			(Argentina) David Bisconti
Cerezo Osaka	(Bosnia and Herzegovina) Almir Turković	(Brazil) João Carlos	(South Korea) Yoon Jong-hwan	(South Korea) Chong Yong-de		
Kawasaki Frontale	(Brazil) Bentinho	(Brazil) Marlon	(Brazil) Marquinho		(Brazil) Alex	(Brazil) Marcos Aurélio
Mito HollyHock	(South Korea) An Seon-jin			(North Korea) Hwang Hak-sun		
Montedio Yamagata						
Oita Trinita	(Brazil) Andradina	(Brazil) Fabinho Santos		(Brazil) Sandro	(Brazil) Marcelo Mattos (South Korea) Kim Sung-kil	
Omiya Ardija	(Brazil) Toninho	(Panama) Jorge Dely Valdés	(Turkey) Fuat Usta			(Brazil) Jorginho
Sagan Tosu	(Argentina) David Bisconti			(Brazil) Erikson Noguchipinto		
Shonan Bellmare	(Colombia) Ever Palacios				(Brazil) Silva	
Ventforet Kofu	(Brazil) Jorginho				(Brazil) Alair	
Yokohama FC	(Argentina) Fernando Moner					

== League format ==
Twelve clubs played in quadruple round-robin format, a total of 44 games each. A club receives 3 points for a win, 1 point for a tie, and 0 points for a loss. The clubs are ranked by points, and tie breakers are, in the following order:

- Goal differential
- Goals scored
- Head-to-head results

A draw would be conducted, if necessary. However, if two clubs are tied at the first place, both clubs will be declared as the champions. The top two clubs are promoted to J1.

== Final league table ==
Pos	Team	Pld	W	D	L	GF	GA	GD	Pts	Promotion or relegation
1	Oita Trinita (C, P)	44	28	10	6	67	34	+33	94	Promotion to 2003 J.League Division 1
2	Cerezo Osaka (P)	44	25	12	7	93	53	+40	87	Promotion to 2003 J.League Division 1
3	Albirex Niigata	44	23	13	8	75	47	+28	82	
4	Kawasaki Frontale	44	23	11	10	71	53	+18	80	
5	Shonan Bellmare	44	16	16	12	46	43	+3	64	
6	Omiya Ardija	44	14	17	13	52	42	+10	59	
7	Ventforet Kofu	44	16	10	18	51	55	−4	58	
8	Avispa Fukuoka	44	10	12	22	58	69	−11	42	
9	Sagan Tosu	44	9	14	21	41	64	−23	41	
10	Mito HollyHock	44	11	7	26	45	73	−28	40	
11	Montedio Yamagata	44	6	17	21	29	57	−28	35	
12	Yokohama FC	44	8	11	25	43	81	−38	35	

Updated to match(es) played on November 24, 2002. Source: J.League Data Site
Rules for classification: 1) points; 2) goal difference; 3) number of goals scored.
(C) Champions; (P) Promoted

== Top scorers ==
Pos	Player	Club	Goals	PK	GP	Shots	Goals per game
1st	(Brazil) Marcus Vinícius	Albirex Niigata	19	4/5	36	139	0.55
2nd	(Japan) Yoshito Ōkubo	Cerezo Osaka	18	1/2	29	65	0.91
2nd	(Brazil) Andradina	Oita Trinita	18	1/1	39	117	0.50
4th	(Brazil) Bentinho	Kawasaki Frontale	16	3/3	36	176	0.44
5th	(Japan) Takayoshi Ono	Mito HollyHock	14	2/2	36	85	0.46
5th	(Japan) Hiroshi Morita	Sagan Tosu	14	0/0	38	86	0.45
5th	(Argentina) David Bisconti	Sagan Tosu	14	4/4	39	92	0.42
8th	(Japan) Yasuo Manaka	Cerezo Osaka	13	1/1	28	67	1.05
8th	(Panama) Jorge Dely Valdés	Omiya Ardija	13	2/2	32	72	0.46
10th	(Japan) Hiroaki Morishima	Cerezo Osaka	12	0/0	37	75	0.34
10th	(Brazil) Marlon	Kawasaki Frontale	12	0/0	23	74	0.58

== Attendances ==
#	Football club	Total attendance	Home games	Average	Highest	Lowest
1	Albirex Niigata	472,507	22	21,478	42,211	9,125
2	Oita Trinita	271,669	22	12,349	27,431	3,094
3	Cerezo Osaka	174,951	22	7,952	32,067	3,067
4	Avispa Fukuoka	142,808	22	6,491	14,475	3,284
5	Omiya Ardija	115,846	22	5,266	19,782	2,517
6	Kawasaki Frontale	115,431	22	5,247	20,405	3,044
7	Shonan Bellmare	100,125	22	4,551	9,739	2,120
8	Ventforet Kofu	108,108	22	4,914	13,000	2,954
9	Sagan Tosu	85,586	22	3,890	8,464	1,796
10	Montedio Yamagata	82,601	22	3,755	8,996	1,908
11	Yokohama FC	76,498	22	3,477	11,118	1,518
12	Mito HollyHock	60,262	22	2,739	5,576	1,136
