= 2004 Shonan Bellmare season =

Shonan Bellmare
2004 season
- Manager: Matsuichi Yamada; Tatsuya Mochizuki; Eiji Ueda
- Stadium: Hiratsuka Athletics Stadium
- J. League 2: 10th
- Emperor's Cup: 5th Round
- Top goalscorer: Michiaki Kakimoto (10)
Home colours	Away colours

During the 2004 season, Shonan Bellmare competed in the J. League 2, in which they finished 10th.

== Competitions ==
Competitions	Position
J. League 2	10th / 12 clubs
Emperor's Cup	5th Round

== Domestic results ==
=== J. League 2 ===
Match	Date	Venue	Opponents	Score
1	2004..			-
2	2004..			-
3	2004..			-
4	2004..			-
5	2004..			-
6	2004..			-
7	2004..			-
8	2004..			-
9	2004..			-
10	2004..			-
11	2004..			-
12	2004..			-
13	2004..			-
14	2004..			-
15	2004..			-
16	2004..			-
17	2004..			-
18	2004..			-
19	2004..			-
20	2004..			-
21	2004..			-
22	2004..			-
23	2004..			-
24	2004..			-
25	2004..			-
26	2004..			-
27	2004..			-
28	2004..			-
29	2004..			-
30	2004..			-
31	2004..			-
32	2004..			-
33	2004..			-
34	2004..			-
35	2004..			-
36	2004..			-
37	2004..			-
38	2004..			-
39	2004..			-
40	2004..			-
41	2004..			-
42	2004..			-
43	2004..			-
44	2004..			-

=== Emperor's Cup ===
Match	Date	Venue	Opponents	Score
3rd Round	2004..			-
4th Round	2004..			-
5th Round	2004..			-

== Player statistics ==
No.	Pos.	Player	D.o.B. (Age)	Height / Weight	J. League 2		Emperor's Cup		Total	
No.	Pos.	Player	D.o.B. (Age)	Height / Weight	Apps	Goals	Apps	Goals	Apps	Goals
1	GK	Masahito Suzuki	April 28, 1977 (aged 26)	cm / kg	29	0				
2	DF	Shinji Jojo	August 28, 1977 (aged 26)	cm / kg	33	0				
3	DF	Tetsuro Uki	October 4, 1971 (aged 32)	cm / kg	39	1				
4	DF	Yu Tokisaki	June 15, 1979 (aged 24)	cm / kg	5	0				
5	DF	Hiroyuki Shirai	June 17, 1974 (aged 29)	cm / kg	17	0				
6	MF	Koji Nakazato	April 24, 1982 (aged 21)	cm / kg	16	0				
7	MF	Yoshikazu Suzuki	June 1, 1982 (aged 21)	cm / kg	26	0				
8	MF	Shingo Kumabayashi	June 23, 1981 (aged 22)	cm / kg	19	0				
9	FW	Yasunori Takada	February 22, 1979 (aged 25)	cm / kg	41	6				
10	MF	Tomoyuki Yoshino	July 9, 1980 (aged 23)	cm / kg	23	0				
11	MF	Koji Sakamoto	December 3, 1978 (aged 25)	cm / kg	38	8				
12	FW	Amaral	October 16, 1966 (aged 37)	cm / kg	19	2				
13	DF	Takayoshi Toda	December 8, 1979 (aged 24)	cm / kg	19	0				
14	FW	Yuki Ishida	November 4, 1980 (aged 23)	cm / kg	15	0				
15	DF	Ever Palacios	January 18, 1969 (aged 35)	cm / kg	17	0				
16	GK	Hiroki Kobayashi	May 24, 1977 (aged 26)	cm / kg	9	0				
17	DF	Tsutomu Kitade	September 18, 1978 (aged 25)	cm / kg	24	2				
18	MF	Daishi Kato	July 26, 1983 (aged 20)	cm / kg	40	0				
19	FW	Naoki Ishihara	August 14, 1984 (aged 19)	cm / kg	3	0				
20	FW	Yuya Sano	April 22, 1982 (aged 21)	cm / kg	26	3				
21	GK	Yuya Funatsu	November 22, 1983 (aged 20)	cm / kg	0	0				
22	DF	Yusuke Murayama	June 10, 1981 (aged 22)	cm / kg	35	4				
23	MF	Yuya Hikichi	May 2, 1983 (aged 20)	cm / kg	6	0				
24	FW	Takuya Hara	June 4, 1983 (aged 20)	cm / kg	6	0				
25	DF	Atsushi Terui	July 19, 1980 (aged 23)	cm / kg	0	0				
26	DF	Masanobu Aoyagi	September 1, 1985 (aged 18)	cm / kg	0	0				
27	DF	Manabu Ikeda	July 3, 1980 (aged 23)	cm / kg	1	0				
28	MF	Kosuke Nakamachi	September 1, 1985 (aged 18)	cm / kg	11	0				
29	MF	Kim Geun-Chol	June 24, 1983 (aged 20)	cm / kg	33	3				
30	MF	Genki Nagasato	December 16, 1985 (aged 18)	cm / kg	0	0				
31	MF	Kosuke Yoshii	March 19, 1986 (aged 17)	cm / kg	5	0				
32	FW	Michiaki Kakimoto	October 6, 1977 (aged 26)	cm / kg	40	10				
33	GK	Kei Uemura	September 24, 1981 (aged 22)	cm / kg	6	0				

== Other pages ==
- (in Japanese) J. League official site
