= 2004 J.League Division 2 =

J. League Division 2
- Season: 2004
- Champions: Kawasaki Frontale; 2nd J2 title 3rd D2 title
- Promoted: Kawasaki Frontale; Omiya Ardija
- Matches: 264
- Goals: 635 (2.41 per match)
- Top goalscorer: Juninho (37 goals)
- Highest attendance: 20,062 (Round 10, Montedio vs. Vegalta)
- Lowest attendance: 1,338 (Round 31, HollyHock vs. Bellmare)
- Average attendance: 7,213

The 2004 J. League Division 2 season was the 33rd season of the second-tier club football in Japan and the 6th season since the establishment of J. League Division 2.

In this season, twelve clubs competed in the quadruple round-robin format. Starting this season, promotion slots increased to 2.5 slots. The top two received automatic promotion and the third-placed finisher advanced to the Pro/Rele Series for the promotion. There were no relegation to the third-tier Japan Football League.

== Clubs ==
Locations of the 2004 J.League 2 teams

The following twelve clubs participated in J. League Division 2 during 2004 season. Of these clubs, Vegalta Sendai and Kyoto Purple Sanga were relegated from Division 1 last season.

- Avispa Fukuoka
- Consadole Sapporo
- Kawasaki Frontale
- Kyoto Purple Sanga
- Mito HollyHock
- Montedio Yamagata
- Omiya Ardija
- Sagan Tosu
- Shonan Bellmare
- Vegalta Sendai
- Ventforet Kofu
- Yokohama FC

=== Personnel ===
Club	Head coach
Avispa Fukuoka	(Japan) Hiroshi Matsuda
Consadole Sapporo	(Japan) Masaaki Yanagishita
Kawasaki Frontale	(Japan) Takashi Sekizuka
Kyoto Purple Sanga	(Japan) Koichi Hashiratani
Mito HollyHock	(Japan) Hideki Maeda
Montedio Yamagata	(Japan) Jun Suzuki
Omiya Ardija	(Japan) Toshiya Miura
Sagan Tosu	(Japan) Ikuo Matsumoto
Shonan Bellmare	(Japan) Matsuichi Yamada
Vegalta Sendai	(Slovenia) Zdenko Verdenik
Ventforet Kofu	(Japan) Hideki Matsunaga
Yokohama FC	(Germany) Pierre Littbarski

=== Foreign players ===
Club	Player 1	Player 2	Player 3	Non-visa foreign	Type-C contract	Former players
Avispa Fukuoka	(Brazil) Bentinho	(Brazil) Edílson	(Brazil) Roberto		(Brazil) Alex	
Consadole Sapporo						(Brazil) Andradina
Kawasaki Frontale	(Brazil) Augusto César	(Brazil) Juninho	(Brazil) Marcus Vinícius			(Brazil) Diogo Tilico
Kyoto Purple Sanga	(Brazil) Biju	(South Korea) Choi Yong-soo	(South Korea) Kim Do-kyun			(Brazil) Leandro Vieira
Mito HollyHock	(Brazil) Marquinho	(Chile) Francisco Fernández		(North Korea) Hwang Hak-sun		
Montedio Yamagata	(Brazil) Denni	(Brazil) Léo San				
Omiya Ardija	(Brazil) Baré	(Brazil) Toninho	(Brazil) Tuto		(Brazil) Daniel Bueno	
Sagan Tosu						
Shonan Bellmare	(Brazil) Amaral				(South Korea) Kim Geun-chol	(Colombia) Ever Palacios
Vegalta Sendai	(Brazil) Fábio Nunes	(Brazil) Silvinho	(North Macedonia) Goce Sedloski	(North Korea) Ryang Yong-gi		(Brazil) Marcos (Slovakia) Jozef Gašpar
Ventforet Kofu	(Brazil) Alair	(Brazil) Lê				(Brazil) Baron (Brazil) Careca
Yokohama FC	(Brazil) Jefferson	(Netherlands) Mathieu Boots	(Scotland) Steven Tweed		(Philippines) Satoshi Ōtomo	

== League format ==
Twelve clubs played in quadruple round-robin format, a total of 44 games each. A club receives 3 points for a win, 1 point for a tie, and 0 points for a loss. The clubs are ranked by points, and tie breakers are, in the following order:

- Goal differential
- Goals scored
- Head-to-head results

A draw would be conducted, if necessary. However, if two clubs are tied at the first place, both clubs will be declared as the champions. The top two clubs will be promoted to J1, while the 3rd placed club plays a two-legged Promotion/relegation series.

Changes from previous year

- Inception of Pro/Rele series for the 3rd place.

== Final league table ==
Pos	Team	Pld	W	D	L	GF	GA	GD	Pts	Promotion or relegation
1	Kawasaki Frontale (C, P)	44	34	3	7	104	38	+66	105	Promotion to 2005 J. League Division 1
2	Omiya Ardija (P)	44	26	9	9	63	38	+25	87	Promotion to 2005 J. League Division 1
3	Avispa Fukuoka	44	23	7	14	56	41	+15	76	Promotion/relegation playoff
4	Montedio Yamagata	44	19	14	11	58	51	+7	71	
5	Kyoto Purple Sanga	44	19	12	13	65	53	+12	69	
6	Vegalta Sendai	44	15	14	15	62	66	−4	59	
7	Ventforet Kofu	44	15	13	16	51	46	+5	58	
8	Yokohama FC	44	10	22	12	42	50	−8	52	
9	Mito HollyHock	44	6	19	19	33	60	−27	37	
10	Shonan Bellmare	44	7	15	22	39	64	−25	36	
11	Sagan Tosu	44	8	11	25	32	66	−34	35	
12	Consadole Sapporo	44	5	15	24	30	62	−32	30	

Updated to match(es) played on November 27, 2004. Source: J. League Division 2
Rules for classification: 1) points; 2) goal difference; 3) number of goals scored.
(C) Champions; (P) Promoted

== Final results ==
Rounds 1 & 2
Home \ Away	FRO	ARD	AVI	MON	SAN	VEG	VEN	YFC	HOL	BEL	SAG	CON
Kawasaki Frontale		1–0	1–0	2–0	1–0	4–1	2–0	2–0	5–2	5–0	3–2	6–0
Omiya Ardija	1–2		2–2	1–1	0–1	3–1	2–1	1–1	2–1	2–0	1–0	0–0
Avispa Fukuoka	0–1	2–1		1–1	0–0	2–3	1–1	0–0	1–0	3–1	3–2	0–1
Montedio Yamagata	2–1	1–3	0–2		1–3	0–0	1–0	1–1	2–2	2–1	1–2	2–1
Kyoto Purple Sanga	1–3	2–3	1–4	3–0		1–2	0–2	2–2	0–0	1–1	0–0	2–0
Vegalta Sendai	2–1	2–1	0–0	1–1	0–5		1–2	1–0	4–1	2–0	3–1	1–1
Ventforet Kofu	1–2	1–2	1–0	0–0	2–1	2–2		6–1	4–0	1–0	1–1	2–1
Yokohama FC	0–2	0–1	1–0	1–1	0–0	4–0	0–0		1–1	1–0	3–0	2–1
Mito HollyHock	0–1	2–0	0–0	1–2	0–1	0–0	0–0	2–2		0–0	0–1	2–1
Shonan Bellmare	0–1	1–0	1–3	1–4	2–2	3–2	1–2	1–1	0–1		2–2	1–1
Sagan Tosu	1–0	0–0	0–3	0–1	0–2	3–0	2–1	1–1	0–0	0–2		2–1
Consadole Sapporo	0–2	1–2	1–2	0–1	0–2	1–0	2–2	1–1	1–2	1–1	1–2	

Updated to match(es) played on July 11, 2004. Source: J. League Division 2
Legend: Blue = home team win; Yellow = draw; Red = away team win.

Rounds 3 & 4
Home \ Away	FRO	ARD	AVI	MON	SAN	VEG	VEN	YFC	HOL	BEL	SAG	CON
Kawasaki Frontale		0–3	3–1	1–2	3–1	2–1	4–2	4–0	5–1	2–1	5–0	2–0
Omiya Ardija	2–1		2–0	1–1	2–0	2–2	1–0	1–1	3–1	1–0	1–0	1–0
Avispa Fukuoka	2–1	0–3		0–1	1–3	1–0	1–0	1–2	2–0	2–0	2–1	1–0
Montedio Yamagata	1–1	1–3	1–3		1–2	2–2	3–0	2–0	3–0	1–1	2–1	1–0
Kyoto Purple Sanga	2–6	2–1	2–1	0–1		2–1	1–0	1–1	0–0	1–2	3–1	4–2
Vegalta Sendai	2–2	0–1	1–2	2–0	4–3		3–1	1–1	1–1	4–1	2–1	1–1
Ventforet Kofu	0–0	3–0	1–2	2–3	1–1	2–1		0–1	1–1	1–0	1–0	0–0
Yokohama FC	2–5	0–1	0–1	0–0	1–1	0–0	0–1		0–1	3–2	3–2	1–1
Mito HollyHock	1–2	1–1	0–1	2–2	1–2	1–2	1–0	1–1		0–0	1–1	1–1
Shonan Bellmare	0–1	2–3	0–1	2–1	0–2	2–2	1–1	0–0	2–0		3–0	1–1
Sagan Tosu	0–3	0–1	1–0	0–2	0–2	1–2	0–0	0–2	0–0	0–0		0–1
Consadole Sapporo	1–3	0–1	0–2	1–2	0–0	1–0	0–2	0–0	2–1	0–0	1–1	

Updated to match(es) played on November 27, 2004. Source: J. League Division 2
Legend: Blue = home team win; Yellow = draw; Red = away team win.

== Promotion / relegation Playoff ==
December 4, 2004
13:03

Avispa Fukuoka	0 - 2	Kashiwa Reysol
	Official Report	47' Ono; 89' Yazawa

Hakata no Mori, Fukuoka
Attendance: 20,522
Referee: Toshimitsu Yoshida

December 12, 2004
15:04

Kashiwa Reysol	2 - 0	Avispa Fukuoka
Unozawa 57'; Hato 61'	Official Report

Kashiwa Soccer Stadium, Kashiwa
Attendance: 13,149
Referee: Joji Kashihara

Kashiwa Reysol won on 4-0 on aggregate, and therefore both clubs remained in their respective leagues.

== Top scorers ==
Rank	Scorer	Club	Goals
1	(Brazil) Juninho	Kawasaki Frontale	37
2	(Japan) Kazuki Ganaha	Kawasaki Frontale	22
2	(Japan) Hideo Ōshima	Montedio Yamagata	22
4	(South Korea) Choi Yong-soo	Kyoto Purple Sanga	20
4	(Japan) Hisato Satō	Vegalta Sendai	20
6	(Brazil) Marcus Vinícius	Kawasaki Frontale	18
7	(Brazil) Baré	Omiya Ardija	15
8	(Brazil) Baron	Ventforet Kofu	14
9	(Japan) Michiaki Kakimoto	Shonan Bellmare	10
9	(Japan) Hiroshi Morita	Omiya Ardija	10

== Attendance figures ==
Pos	Team	Total	High	Low	Average	Change
1	Vegalta Sendai	356,359	18,751	12,023	16,198	−25.4%^{†}
2	Consadole Sapporo	208,241	19,873	5,061	9,466	−12.1%
3	Kawasaki Frontale	201,264	20,043	4,402	9,148	+26.0%
4	Avispa Fukuoka	192,349	15,444	5,130	8,743	+17.9%
5	Kyoto Purple Sanga	171,764	10,579	3,124	7,807	−28.0%^{†}
6	Montedio Yamagata	141,246	20,062	2,964	6,420	+46.9%
7	Ventforet Kofu	140,141	10,121	2,401	6,370	+9.9%
8	Omiya Ardija	134,365	12,004	1,901	6,108	+20.8%
9	Shonan Bellmare	103,208	9,879	2,711	4,691	−0.8%
10	Yokohama FC	92,818	12,180	2,011	4,219	+12.7%
11	Mito HollyHock	83,002	9,155	1,338	3,773	+22.3%
12	Sagan Tosu	79,415	9,565	2,269	3,610	+13.8%
	League total	1,904,172	20,062	1,338	7,213	−8.6%

Updated to games played on November 27, 2004
Source: J. League Division 2
Notes:
^{†} Team played previous season in J1.
