= 2010 Thespa Kusatsu season =

Thespa Kusatsu
2010 season
- Manager: Hiroshi Soejima
- Stadium: Shoda Shoyu Stadium Gunma
- J. League 2: 12th
- Emperor's Cup: 2nd Round
- Top goalscorer: Rafinha (8)

2010 Thespa Kusatsu season

== Competitions ==
Competitions	Position
J. League 2	12th / 19 clubs
Emperor's Cup	2nd Round

== Player statistics ==
No.	Pos.	Player	D.o.B. (Age)	Height / Weight	J. League 2		Emperor's Cup		Total	
No.	Pos.	Player	D.o.B. (Age)	Height / Weight	Apps	Goals	Apps	Goals	Apps	Goals
1	GK	Takuma Ito	August 11, 1986 (aged 23)	cm / kg	5	0				
2	MF	Kazuyuki Toda	December 30, 1977 (aged 32)	cm / kg	12	1				
3	DF	Kei Omoto	July 21, 1984 (aged 25)	cm / kg	11	2				
4	DF	Jun Tanaka	September 1, 1983 (aged 26)	cm / kg	28	0				
5	DF	Choi Sung-Yong	December 25, 1975 (aged 34)	cm / kg	4	0				
6	MF	Kazuki Sakurada	August 1, 1982 (aged 27)	cm / kg	27	0				
7	MF	Sotaro Sada	March 18, 1984 (aged 25)	cm / kg	25	1				
8	FW	Rafinha	June 30, 1987 (aged 22)	cm / kg	34	8				
9	FW	Yasunori Takada	February 22, 1979 (aged 31)	cm / kg	33	4				
10	MF	Nozomi Hiroyama	May 6, 1977 (aged 32)	cm / kg	29	0				
11	FW	Ryoji Ujihara	May 10, 1981 (aged 28)	cm / kg	9	1				
13	DF	Shingo Arizono	December 4, 1985 (aged 24)	cm / kg	14	0				
14	MF	Shingo Kumabayashi	June 23, 1981 (aged 28)	cm / kg	27	2				
15	MF	Masafumi Maeda	January 25, 1983 (aged 27)	cm / kg	11	0				
16	DF	Masaya Sato	February 10, 1990 (aged 20)	cm / kg	10	0				
17	MF	Nobuhide Akiba	April 10, 1985 (aged 24)	cm / kg	3	0				
18	DF	Takafumi Mikuriya	May 11, 1984 (aged 25)	cm / kg	31	3				
19	MF	Ryo Goto	August 25, 1986 (aged 23)	cm / kg	20	3				
20	DF	Shingo Shibata	July 13, 1985 (aged 24)	cm / kg	2	0				
21	GK	Satoshi Tokizawa	July 31, 1985 (aged 24)	cm / kg	27	0				
22	GK	Kazuma Kita	December 21, 1981 (aged 28)	cm / kg	4	0				
23	MF	Daisuke Kikuchi	April 12, 1991 (aged 18)	cm / kg	27	4				
24	DF	Daiki Umei	October 5, 1989 (aged 20)	cm / kg	5	0				
25	MF	Kohei Yamada	January 8, 1989 (aged 21)	cm / kg	18	0				
26	DF	Ryota Kobayashi	June 22, 1988 (aged 21)	cm / kg	0	0				
27	FW	Hiroyuki Sugimoto	October 6, 1986 (aged 23)	cm / kg	17	0				
30	MF	Yuki Matsushita	December 7, 1981 (aged 28)	cm / kg	33	3				
32	DF	Daniel	March 10, 1981 (aged 28)	cm / kg	6	0				
33	MF	Alex	March 20, 1985 (aged 24)	cm / kg	7	3				
34	DF	Yoshiya Nishizawa	June 13, 1987 (aged 22)	cm / kg	17	0				

== Other pages ==
- (in Japanese) J. League official site
