= 2003 J.League Division 2 =

J. League Division 2
- Season: 2003
- Champions: Albirex Niigata; 1st J2 title 1st D2 title
- Promoted: Albirex Niigata; Sanfrecce Hiroshima
- Matches: 264
- Goals: 678 (2.57 per match)
- Top goalscorer: Marcus Vinícius (32 goals)
- Highest attendance: 42,223 (Round 44, Albirex vs. Ardija)
- Lowest attendance: 1,337 (Round 4, HollyHock vs. Ardija)
- Average attendance: 7,895

The 2003 J. League Division 2 season was the 32nd season of the second-tier club football in Japan and the 5th season since the establishment of J.League Division 2.

In this season, twelve clubs competed in the quadruple round-robin format. The top two received promotion to the J. League Division 1. There were no relegation to the third-tier Japan Football League.

== Clubs ==
Locations of the 2003 J.League 2 teams

The following twelve clubs participated in J. League Division 2 during 2003 season. Of these clubs, Consadole Sapporo and Sanfrecce Hiroshima were relegated from Division 1 last year.

- Albirex Niigata
- Avispa Fukuoka
- Consadole Sapporo
- Kawasaki Frontale
- Mito HollyHock
- Montedio Yamagata
- Omiya Ardija
- Sagan Tosu
- Sanfrecce Hiroshima
- Shonan Bellmare
- Ventforet Kofu
- Yokohama FC

=== Personnel ===
Club	Head coach
Albirex Niigata	(Japan) Yasuharu Sorimachi
Avispa Fukuoka	(Japan) Hiroshi Matsuda
Consadole Sapporo	(South Korea) Chang Woe-ryong
Kawasaki Frontale	(Japan) Nobuhiro Ishizaki
Mito HollyHock	(Japan) Hideki Maeda
Montedio Yamagata	(Japan) Koichi Hashiratani
Omiya Ardija	(Japan) Eijun Kiyokumo
Sagan Tosu	(Japan) Yoshinori Sembiki
Sanfrecce Hiroshima	(Japan) Takeshi Ono
Shonan Bellmare	(Japan) Matsuichi Yamada
Ventforet Kofu	(Japan) Hideki Matsunaga
Yokohama FC	(Germany) Pierre Littbarski

=== Foreign players ===
Club	Player 1	Player 2	Player 3	Non-visa foreign	Type-C contract	Former players
Albirex Niigata	(Brazil) Anderson Batatais	(Brazil) Fabinho Santos	(Brazil) Marcus Vinícius	(Canada) Issey Nakajima-Farran (North Korea) An Yong-hak	(Brazil) Geílson	
Avispa Fukuoka	(Brazil) Bentinho	(Brazil) Serjão			(Brazil) Alex	
Consadole Sapporo	(Brazil) Andradina	(Brazil) Reginaldo	(Netherlands) Tarik Oulida			(Brazil) Beto (Brazil) Robert (Brazil) Will
Kawasaki Frontale	(Brazil) Augusto César	(Brazil) Juninho	(Brazil) Robert		(Brazil) Diogo Tilico	(Panama) Jorge Dely Valdés
Mito HollyHock	(Chile) Francisco Fernández	(Chile) Frank Lobos		(Brazil) Marcus Tulio Tanaka (North Korea) Hwang Hak-sun		
Montedio Yamagata	(Brazil) Nivaldo					(Brazil) Alexandre
Omiya Ardija	(Brazil) Baré	(Brazil) Edson Araújo	(Brazil) Toninho			(Brazil) Alexandre Finazzi
Sagan Tosu	(Brazil) Jefferson	(Brazil) Juninho	(Brazil) Pericles	(Philippines) Satoshi Ōtomo		(Brazil) Bruno Cabrerizo (Brazil) Junior Coimbra
Sanfrecce Hiroshima	(Brazil) César Sampaio	(Brazil) Marcelo Ramos	(Brazil) Ricardo	(North Korea) Ri Han-jae		(Croatia) Tomislav Erceg
Shonan Bellmare	(Colombia) Ever Palacios				(South Korea) Kim Geun-chol	(Brazil) Santos (Colombia) Hámilton Ricard
Ventforet Kofu	(Brazil) Jorginho				(Brazil) Alair	(Brazil) Juninho
Yokohama FC	(Albania) Rudi Vata	(Germany) Dirk Lehmann	(Netherlands) Mathieu Boots			(Argentina) Fernando Moner (Germany) Dirk van der Ven

== League format ==
Twelve clubs played in quadruple round-robin format, a total of 44 games each. A club receives 3 points for a win, 1 point for a tie, and 0 points for a loss. The clubs are ranked by points, and tie breakers are, in the following order:

- Goal differential
- Goals scored
- Head-to-head results

A draw would be conducted, if necessary. However, if two clubs are tied at the first place, both clubs would be declared as the champions. The top two clubs are promoted to J1.

== League table ==
Pos	Team	Pld	W	D	L	GF	GA	GD	Pts	Promotion or relegation
1	Albirex Niigata (C, P)	44	27	7	10	80	40	+40	88	Promotion to 2004 J. League Division 1
2	Sanfrecce Hiroshima (P)	44	25	11	8	65	35	+30	86	Promotion to 2004 J. League Division 1
3	Kawasaki Frontale	44	24	13	7	88	47	+41	85	
4	Avispa Fukuoka	44	21	8	15	67	62	+5	71	
5	Ventforet Kofu	44	19	12	13	58	46	+12	69	
6	Omiya Ardija	44	18	7	19	52	61	−9	61	
7	Mito HollyHock	44	15	11	18	37	41	−4	56	
8	Montedio Yamagata	44	15	10	19	52	60	−8	55	
9	Consadole Sapporo	44	13	13	18	57	56	+1	52	
10	Shonan Bellmare	44	11	11	22	33	53	−20	44	
11	Yokohama FC	44	10	12	22	49	88	−39	42	
12	Sagan Tosu	44	3	11	30	40	89	−49	20	

Updated to match(es) played on November 23, 2003. Source: J. League Division 2
Rules for classification: 1) points; 2) goal difference; 3) number of goals scored.
(C) Champions; (P) Promoted

== Final results ==
Rounds 1 & 2
Home \ Away	ALB	SFR	FRO	AVI	VEN	ARD	HOL	MON	CON	BEL	YFC	SAG
Albirex Niigata		1–2	1–0	4–0	0–0	4–0	2–2	1–1	0–1	1–0	2–1	2–1
Sanfrecce Hiroshima	0–0		2–2	3–1	1–0	2–1	3–0	2–1	1–1	0–0	6–1	2–1
Kawasaki Frontale	0–4	1–0		2–1	1–1	1–1	2–2	5–1	1–0	2–1	1–1	6–3
Avispa Fukuoka	1–2	0–2	0–2		1–2	0–1	1–2	2–2	0–0	2–0	3–2	5–2
Ventforet Kofu	1–3	1–0	0–2	2–1		1–2	0–2	1–2	2–1	1–0	1–1	1–1
Omiya Ardija	1–4	1–1	1–0	2–1	0–3		1–3	0–2	1–1	0–0	0–2	1–0
Mito HollyHock	0–1	0–1	0–1	1–1	1–0	0–2		0–2	1–1	1–0	2–0	1–0
Montedio Yamagata	1–0	0–0	2–2	0–0	1–0	1–0	1–0		2–3	0–2	1–1	4–1
Consadole Sapporo	2–0	0–2	0–0	5–0	3–3	6–2	2–4	1–0		1–1	1–3	3–0
Shonan Bellmare	1–2	0–1	0–4	1–2	0–3	0–0	1–0	2–0	0–2		1–1	2–1
Yokohama FC	1–0	0–1	0–4	1–1	1–5	0–1	1–2	0–4	0–0	2–0		1–1
Sagan Tosu	0–1	3–4	0–0	2–3	1–1	3–2	0–0	1–3	1–0	0–0	5–2	

Updated to match(es) played on July 6, 2003. Source: J. League Division 2
Legend: Blue = home team win; Yellow = draw; Red = away team win.

Rounds 3 & 4
Home \ Away	ALB	SFR	FRO	AVI	VEN	ARD	HOL	MON	CON	BEL	YFC	SAG
Albirex Niigata		3–1	3–2	3–2	2–0	1–0	0–0	4–1	5–1	2–1	4–2	2–1
Sanfrecce Hiroshima	1–0		1–1	0–2	2–0	1–2	1–1	1–0	1–0	3–0	3–0	2–1
Kawasaki Frontale	3–0	2–1		5–2	4–1	0–1	1–2	2–1	1–0	2–1	3–3	7–1
Avispa Fukuoka	2–1	3–1	2–3		3–0	5–3	1–0	1–0	1–0	1–0	1–1	2–1
Ventforet Kofu	2–1	0–0	2–0	0–0		3–0	1–0	2–1	1–1	2–0	3–0	2–0
Omiya Ardija	0–2	0–2	0–2	0–1	0–0		3–1	0–2	3–0	2–2	3–0	3–0
Mito HollyHock	1–0	0–0	0–1	0–1	1–2	1–2		1–0	0–0	1–2	0–0	1–0
Montedio Yamagata	1–2	1–2	0–0	3–3	2–1	1–0	0–0		2–1	1–0	1–2	1–1
Consadole Sapporo	2–2	1–2	1–1	1–2	0–2	0–1	1–0	4–1		1–2	2–2	4–1
Shonan Bellmare	0–0	1–0	2–2	0–3	2–2	2–0	0–1	3–0	0–2		1–0	2–1
Yokohama FC	1–7	0–2	2–5	0–1	1–2	0–3	2–1	4–2	2–0	1–0		3–1
Sagan Tosu	0–1	2–2	0–2	0–2	1–1	1–4	0–1	0–1	0–1	0–0	1–1	

Updated to match(es) played on November 23, 2003. Source: J. League Division 2
Legend: Blue = home team win; Yellow = draw; Red = away team win.

== Top scorers ==
Rank	Scorer	Club	Goals
1	(Brazil) Marcus Vinícius	Albirex Niigata	32
2	(Brazil) Juninho	Kawasaki Frontale	28
3	(Brazil) Baré	Omiya Ardija	22
4	(Brazil) Bentinho	Avispa Fukuoka	20
5	(Brazil) Augusto César	Kawasaki Frontale	17
6	(Brazil) Marcelo Ramos	Sanfrecce Hiroshima	14
7	(Japan) Kazuki Ganaha	Kawasaki Frontale	13
7	(Japan) Yusaku Ueno	Albirex Niigata	13
9	(Japan) Shoji Jo	Yokohama FC	12
10	(Japan) Hiroyuki Hayashi	Avispa Fukuoka	11
10	(Japan) Kosei Nakamura	Montedio Yamagata	11

== Attendance figures ==
Pos	Team	Total	High	Low	Average	Change
1	Albirex Niigata	667,447	42,223	8,644	30,339	+41.3%
2	Consadole Sapporo	236,861	23,590	3,653	10,766	−44.5%^{†}
3	Sanfrecce Hiroshima	198,004	26,158	3,471	9,000	−17.7%^{†}
4	Avispa Fukuoka	163,165	13,921	3,448	7,417	+14.3%
5	Kawasaki Frontale	159,678	22,087	2,438	7,258	+38.3%
6	Ventforet Kofu	127,515	13,043	2,382	5,796	+17.9%
7	Omiya Ardija	111,274	20,686	1,357	5,058	−3.9%
8	Shonan Bellmare	104,085	8,276	2,772	4,731	+4.0%
9	Montedio Yamagata	96,142	10,096	2,743	4,370	+16.4%
10	Yokohama FC	82,351	8,574	1,851	3,743	+7.7%
11	Sagan Tosu	69,789	5,756	1,585	3,172	−18.5%
12	Mito HollyHock	67,874	5,889	1,337	3,085	+12.6%
	League total	2,084,185	42,223	1,337	7,895	+15.4%

Updated to games played on November 23, 2003
Source: J. League Division 2
Notes:
^{†} Team played previous season in J1.
