= 2002 Shonan Bellmare season =

Shonan Bellmare
2002 season
- Manager: Koji Tanaka
- Stadium: Hiratsuka Athletics Stadium
- J. League 2: 5th
- Emperor's Cup: 4th Round
- Top goalscorer: Yasunori Takada (9)
Home colours	Away colours

2002 Shonan Bellmare season

== Competitions ==
Competitions	Position
J. League 2	5th / 12 clubs
Emperor's Cup	4th Round

== Domestic results ==
=== J. League 2 ===
Match	Date	Venue	Opponents	Score
1	2002.3.3	Todoroki Athletics Stadium	Kawasaki Frontale	1-1
2	2002.3.9	Hiratsuka Athletics Stadium	Mito HollyHock	2-1
3	2002.3.16	Nagai Aid Stadium	Cerezo Osaka	0-3
4	2002.3.21	Niigata City Athletic Stadium	Albirex Niigata	2-2
5	2002.3.24	Hiratsuka Athletics Stadium	Montedio Yamagata	0-1
6	2002.3.30	Hakata no mori stadium	Avispa Fukuoka	1-1
7	2002.4.6	Hiratsuka Athletics Stadium	Ventforet Kofu	0-0
8	2002.4.10	Mitsuzawa (ja:横浜市Mitsuzawa Stadium公園陸上競技場)	Yokohama F.C.	2-2
9	2002.4.13	Tosu Stadium	Sagan Tosu	1-0
10	2002.4.20	Hiratsuka Athletics Stadium	Oita Trinita	0-1
11	2002.4.24	Hiratsuka Athletics Stadium	Omiya Ardija	0-0
12	2002.4.28	Hitachinaka (ja:ひたちなか市総合運動公園陸上競技場)	Mito HollyHock	1-2
13	2002.5.3	Hiratsuka Athletics Stadium	Albirex Niigata	1-4
14	2002.5.6	Yamagata Park Stadium	Montedio Yamagata	0-2
15	2002.5.12	Hiratsuka Athletics Stadium	Avispa Fukuoka	1-0
16	2002.7.6	Kose Sports Stadium	Ventforet Kofu	2-0
17	2002.7.10	Hiratsuka Athletics Stadium	Yokohama F.C.	3-0
18	2002.7.14	Ōmiya Park Soccer Stadium	Omiya Ardija	0-0
19	2002.7.20	Hiratsuka Athletics Stadium	Kawasaki Frontale	2-0
20	2002.7.24	Hiratsuka Athletics Stadium	Sagan Tosu	2-2
21	2002.7.27	Ōita Stadium	Oita Trinita	0-0
22	2002.8.3	Hiratsuka Athletics Stadium	Cerezo Osaka	1-2
23	2002.8.7	Hakata no mori stadium	Avispa Fukuoka	0-3
24	2002.8.10	Hiratsuka Athletics Stadium	Omiya Ardija	1-1
25	2002.8.17	Yumenoshima Stadium	Yokohama F.C.	3-1
26	2002.8.21	Tosu Stadium	Sagan Tosu	2-1
27	2002.8.25	Hiratsuka Athletics Stadium	Mito HollyHock	1-0
28	2002.8.31	Todoroki Athletics Stadium	Kawasaki Frontale	0-4
29	2002.9.7	Hiratsuka Athletics Stadium	Ventforet Kofu	0-1
30	2002.9.11	Hiratsuka Athletics Stadium	Oita Trinita	1-0
31	2002.9.14	Niigata Stadium	Albirex Niigata	1-2
32	2002.9.21	Hiratsuka Athletics Stadium	Montedio Yamagata	0-0
33	2002.9.25	Nagai Aid Stadium	Cerezo Osaka	2-1
34	2002.9.28	Hiratsuka Athletics Stadium	Avispa Fukuoka	2-0
35	2002.10.5	Hiratsuka Athletics Stadium	Sagan Tosu	0-0
36	2002.10.9	Oita (ja:大分市営陸上競技場)	Oita Trinita	0-2
37	2002.10.12	Hiratsuka Athletics Stadium	Albirex Niigata	1-1
38	2002.10.19	Kasamatsu Stadium	Mito HollyHock	4-1
39	2002.10.23	Hiratsuka Athletics Stadium	Cerezo Osaka	2-0
40	2002.10.26	Yamagata Park Stadium	Montedio Yamagata	0-0
41	2002.11.2	Kose Sports Stadium	Ventforet Kofu	1-0
42	2002.11.9	Hiratsuka Athletics Stadium	Yokohama F.C.	3-1
43	2002.11.17	Ōmiya Park Soccer Stadium	Omiya Ardija	0-0
44	2002.11.24	Hiratsuka Athletics Stadium	Kawasaki Frontale	0-0

=== Emperor's Cup ===
Match	Date	Venue	Opponents	Score
1st Round	2002..	[[]]	[[]]	-
2nd Round	2002..	[[]]	[[]]	-
3rd Round	2002..	[[]]	[[]]	-
4th Round	2002..	[[]]	[[]]	-

== Player statistics ==
No.	Pos.	Player	D.o.B. (Age)	Height / Weight	J. League 2		Emperor's Cup		Total	
No.	Pos.	Player	D.o.B. (Age)	Height / Weight	Apps	Goals	Apps	Goals	Apps	Goals
1	GK	Yuji Ito	May 20, 1965 (aged 36)	cm / kg	19	0				
2	DF	Osamu Umeyama	August 16, 1973 (aged 28)	cm / kg	40	0				
3	DF	Hideaki Tominaga	August 27, 1976 (aged 25)	cm / kg	32	1				
4	DF	Ever Palacios	January 18, 1969 (aged 33)	cm / kg	40	5				
5	DF	Hiroyuki Shirai	June 17, 1974 (aged 27)	cm / kg	33	0				
6	DF	Yasuhide Ihara	March 8, 1973 (aged 28)	cm / kg	22	1				
7	MF	Yoshikazu Suzuki	June 1, 1982 (aged 19)	cm / kg	29	2				
8	MF	Keisuke Kurihara	May 20, 1973 (aged 28)	cm / kg	38	7				
9	FW	Yasunori Takada	February 22, 1979 (aged 23)	cm / kg	42	9				
10	MF	Silva	April 14, 1981 (aged 20)	cm / kg	16	1				
11	MF	Koji Sakamoto	December 3, 1978 (aged 23)	cm / kg	38	7				
13	FW	Daisuke Sudo	April 25, 1977 (aged 24)	cm / kg	22	5				
14	MF	Toshiki Koike	November 10, 1974 (aged 27)	cm / kg	6	0				
15	MF	Koji Nakazato	April 24, 1982 (aged 19)	cm / kg	4	0				
16	GK	Tomohiko Ito	May 28, 1978 (aged 23)	cm / kg	0	0				
17	MF	Daisuke Kimori	July 28, 1977 (aged 24)	cm / kg	6	0				
18	DF	Yu Tokisaki	June 15, 1979 (aged 22)	cm / kg	27	0				
19	FW	Tatsuhiro Nishimoto	April 29, 1980 (aged 21)	cm / kg	1	0				
20	MF	Kazuhiko Tanabe	June 3, 1981 (aged 20)	cm / kg	18	0				
21	GK	Masahito Suzuki	April 28, 1977 (aged 24)	cm / kg	25	0				
22	MF	Yoshihide Nishikawa	April 10, 1978 (aged 23)	cm / kg	2	0				
23	DF	Kei Sugimoto	June 4, 1982 (aged 19)	cm / kg	4	0				
24	DF	Takayoshi Toda	December 8, 1979 (aged 22)	cm / kg	22	3				
25	DF	Takanori Nakajima	February 9, 1984 (aged 18)	cm / kg	11	0				
26	GK	Takashi Takusagawa	February 12, 1981 (aged 21)	cm / kg	0	0				
27	MF	Daishi Kato	July 26, 1983 (aged 18)	cm / kg	23	0				
28	MF	Takumi Motohashi	August 3, 1982 (aged 19)	cm / kg	15	1				
29	MF	Tomoyuki Yoshino	July 9, 1980 (aged 21)	cm / kg	27	1				
30	MF	Shingo Kumabayashi	June 23, 1981 (aged 20)	cm / kg	28	2				

== Other pages ==
- (in Japanese) J. League official site
