= Kitade =

Kitade is a surname. Notable people with the surname include:

- Nana Kitade (born 1987), Japanese singer-songwriter and musician
- Naohiro Kitade (born 1973), Japanese football player
- Takuya Kitade (born 1992), Japanese rugby union player
- Tsutomu Kitade (born 1976), Japanese football player
