= Lê (footballer, born July 1979) =

Brazilian footballer

Personal information
- Full name: Leandro Cesar de Sousa
- Date of birth: 6 July 1979 (age 47)
- Place of birth: Araraquara, Brazil
- Height: 1.88 m (6 ft 2 in)
- Position: Defensive midfielder

Senior career*
Years	Team	Apps	(Gls)
2001	Matonense		
2001	Santa Cruz		
2004	Ventforet Kofu	6	(0)
2005	Araçatuba		
2007	Uberlândia		
2010	ASA	1	(0)
2011	Goianésia		
2011–	Araguaína	2	(0)
- * Club domestic league appearances and goals

Leandro Cesar de Sousa (born 6 July 1979) is a Brazilian football player.

== Club statistics ==
Club performance			League		Cup		Total	
Season	Club	League	Apps	Goals	Apps	Goals	Apps	Goals
Japan			League		Emperor's Cup		Total	
2004	Ventforet Kofu	J2 League	6	0				
Country	Japan		6	0				
Total			6	0				
