= Hiroyuki Shirai =

Japanese footballer

Hiroyuki Shirai 白井 博幸
Personal information
- Full name: Hiroyuki Shirai
- Date of birth: 17 June 1974 (age 52)
- Place of birth: Fuji, Shizuoka, Japan
- Height: 1.80 m (5 ft 11 in)
- Position: Defender

Team information
- Current team: FC Ryukyu (coach)

Youth career
- 1990–1992: Tokai University Daiichi High School

Senior career*
Years	Team	Apps	(Gls)
1993–1996	Shimizu S-Pulse	43	(2)
1997	Verdy Kawasaki	17	(0)
1998	Cerezo Osaka	21	(0)
2000–2005	Shonan Bellmare	126	(2)
2006–2007	Vegalta Sendai	31	(0)
2008	FC Ryukyu	3	(0)
Total		241	(4)

International career
1996	Japan U-23	2	(0)
Medal record
Shimizu S-Pulse
Winner	J.League Cup	1996
Runner-up	J.League Cup	1993
- * Club domestic league appearances and goals

Hiroyuki Shirai (白井 博幸, Shirai Hiroyuki; born 17 June 1974) is a former Japanese football player who is currently a coach at J3 League club FC Ryukyu.

== Club career ==
Shirai was born in Fuji on 17 June 1974. After graduating from high school, he joined his local club Shimizu S-Pulse in 1993. He moved to Verdy Kawasaki (1997) and then to Cerezo Osaka in 1998. He 2000 he joined J2 League club Shonan Bellmare and he played there for six seasons. In 2006 he moved to Vegalta Sendai. Initially he played as regular player. However, he lost regular position due to injury in June 2006. In 2008 he moved to Japan Football League club FC Ryukyu. He played only three league matches; this was due to injury. He retired at the end of the 2008 season.

== National team career ==
In July 1996, Shirai was selected Japan U-23 national team for 1996 Summer Olympics. At this tournament, he played 2 matches. Although Japan won 2 matches, Japan lost at first round. Japan beat Brazil in first game, it is known as "Miracle of Miami" (マイアミの奇跡) in Japan.

== Club statistics ==
Club performance			League		Cup		League Cup		Total	
Season	Club	League	Apps	Goals	Apps	Goals	Apps	Goals	Apps	Goals
Japan			League		Emperor's Cup		J.League Cup		Total	
1993	Shimizu S-Pulse	J1 League	0	0	0	0	1	0	1	0
1994	Shimizu S-Pulse	J1 League	14	1	1	0	0	0	15	0
1995	Shimizu S-Pulse	J1 League	24	1	1	0	-		25	1
1996	Shimizu S-Pulse	J1 League	5	0	0	0	1	0	6	0
1997	Verdy Kawasaki	J1 League	17	0	1	0	2	0	20	0
1998	Cerezo Osaka	J1 League	21	0	0	0	4	0	25	0
2000	Shonan Bellmare	J2 League	21	0	0	0	1	0	22	0
2001	Shonan Bellmare	J2 League	15	0	0	0	1	0	16	0
2002	Shonan Bellmare	J2 League	33	0	3	0	-		36	0
2003	Shonan Bellmare	J2 League	30	2	4	0	-		34	2
2004	Shonan Bellmare	J2 League	17	0	1	0	-		18	0
2005	Shonan Bellmare	J2 League	10	0	0	0	-		10	0
2006	Vegalta Sendai	J2 League	19	0	0	0	-		19	0
2007	Vegalta Sendai	J2 League	12	0	1	0	-		13	0
2008	FC Ryukyu	Football League	3	0	-		-		3	0
Total			241	4	12	0	10	0	263	4
