= Yu Tokisaki =

Japanese footballer

Yu Tokisaki 時崎 悠
Personal information
- Full name: Yu Tokisaki
- Date of birth: June 15, 1979 (age 47)
- Place of birth: Fukushima, Japan
- Height: 1.80 m (5 ft 11 in)
- Position: Defender

Youth career
- 1995–1997: Sakushin Gakuin High School

Senior career*
| Years | Team | Apps | (Gls) |
| 1998–2005 | Shonan Bellmare | 85 | (3) |
| 2005–2006 | Mito HollyHock | 32 | (1) |
| 2007–2011 | Fukushima United FC | 37 | (15) |
| Total | | 154 | (19) |

Managerial career
- 2007: FC Pelada Fukushima
- 2008: Fukushima United
- 2012–2013: Fukushima United
- 2014–2018: Shonan Bellmare U18
- 2021: Fukushima United
- 2022-2023: Tochigi SC
- * Club domestic league appearances and goals

Yu Tokisaki (時崎 悠, Tokisaki Yu; born June 15, 1979) is a former Japanese football player and coach His brother Rui Tokisaki is also a former footballer.

== Playing career ==
Tokisaki was born in Fukushima on June 15, 1979. After graduating from high school, he joined J1 League club Bellmare Hiratsuka (later Shonan Bellmare) in 1998. He could not play at all in the match until 1999. The club was also relegated to J2 League from 2000. In 2000, he debuted and played many matches as center back. Although he could hardly play in the match in 2001, he played many matches in 2002 and 2003. In 2002, he also played as side back not only center back. However he could hardly play in the match from 2004. In June 2005, he moved to J2 club Mito HollyHock. Although he could hardly play in the match in 2005, he played many matches as center back in 2006. In 2007, he moved to his local club FC Pelada Fukushima (later Fukushima United FC) in Regional Leagues. His brother Rui Tokisaki also played for the club from 2007 and they played together until 2011. He played many matches until 2009. He could not play at all in the match from 2010 and retired at the end of the 2011 season.

== Coaching career ==
In 2007, when Tokisaki was player, he moved to his local club FC Pelada Fukushima (later Fukushima United FC) in Regional Leagues and became a playing manager. He managed the club in 2007 season. In September 2008, he became a playing manager again and managed the club until end of 2008 season. After retirement playing career end of 2011 season, he became a manager in 2012. The club was promoted to Japan Football League from 2013. He resigned end of 2013 season. In 2014, he moved to his first club Shonan Bellmare. He coached for youth team until 2016.

== Career statistics ==
Appearances and goals by club, season and competition
| Club | Season | League | | | Emperor's Cup | | J.League Cup | | Total | |
| Club | Season | Division | Apps | Goals | Apps | Goals | Apps | Goals | Apps | Goals |
|---|---|---|---|---|---|---|---|---|---|---|
| Bellmare Hiratsuka | 1998 | J1 League | 0 | 0 | 0 | 0 | 0 | 0 | 0 | 0 |
| Bellmare Hiratsuka | 1999 | J1 League | 0 | 0 | 0 | 0 | 0 | 0 | 0 | 0 |
| Shonan Bellmare | 2000 | J2 League | 17 | 2 | 0 | 0 | 0 | 0 | 17 | 2 |
| Shonan Bellmare | 2001 | J2 League | 3 | 0 | 0 | 0 | 0 | 0 | 3 | 0 |
| Shonan Bellmare | 2002 | J2 League | 27 | 0 | 4 | 1 | - | | 31 | 1 |
| Shonan Bellmare | 2003 | J2 League | 33 | 1 | 3 | 0 | - | | 36 | 1 |
| Shonan Bellmare | 2004 | J2 League | 5 | 0 | 0 | 0 | - | | 5 | 0 |
| Shonan Bellmare | 2005 | J2 League | 0 | 0 | 0 | 0 | - | | 0 | 0 |
| Mito HollyHock | 2005 | J2 League | 1 | 0 | 0 | 0 | - | | 1 | 0 |
| Mito HollyHock | 2006 | J2 League | 31 | 1 | 1 | 0 | - | | 32 | 1 |
| FC Pelada Fukushima | 2007 | Regional Leagues | 14 | 4 | - | | - | | 14 | 4 |
| Fukushima United | 2008 | Regional Leagues | 13 | 7 | 1 | 1 | - | | 14 | 8 |
| Fukushima United | 2009 | Regional Leagues | 10 | 4 | 3 | 1 | - | | 13 | 5 |
| Fukushima United | 2010 | Regional Leagues | 0 | 0 | 0 | 0 | - | | 0 | 0 |
| Fukushima United | 2011 | Regional Leagues | 0 | 0 | 0 | 0 | - | | 0 | 0 |
| Career total | | | 154 | 19 | 12 | 3 | 0 | 0 | 166 | 22 |
