= Yoshikazu Suzuki =

Japanese footballer

Yoshikazu Suzuki 鈴木 良和
Personal information
- Full name: Yoshikazu Suzuki
- Date of birth: June 1, 1982 (age 44)
- Place of birth: Fujieda, Shizuoka, Japan
- Height: 1.64 m (5 ft 4 1/2 in)
- Position: Midfielder

Youth career
- 1998–2000: Tokai University Shoyo High School

Senior career*
Years	Team	Apps	(Gls)
2001–2005	Shonan Bellmare	136	(7)
2006–2008	Mito HollyHock	68	(3)
Total		204	(10)
- * Club domestic league appearances and goals

Yoshikazu Suzuki (鈴木 良和, Suzuki Yoshikazu; born June 1, 1982) is a former Japanese football player.

== Playing career ==
Suzuki was born in Fujieda on June 1, 1982. After graduating from high school, he joined J2 League club Shonan Bellmare in 2001. He became a regular player from first season. Although he played many matches from 2002, his opportunity to play decreased for injuries and he left the club end of 2005 season. After a half year blank, he joined Mito HollyHock in August 2006. He played many matches until 2008 and retired end of 2008 season.

== Career statistics ==
Appearances and goals by club, season and competition
Club	Season	League			Emperor's Cup		J.League Cup		Total	
Club	Season	Division	Apps	Goals	Apps	Goals	Apps	Goals	Apps	Goals
Shonan Bellmare	2001	J2 League	43	5	2	0	2	0	47	5
Shonan Bellmare	2002	J2 League	29	2	4	0	-		33	2
Shonan Bellmare	2003	J2 League	13	0	0	0	-		13	0
Shonan Bellmare	2004	J2 League	26	0	2	0	-		28	0
Shonan Bellmare	2005	J2 League	25	0	0	0	-		25	0
Mito HollyHock	2006	J2 League	9	0	0	0	-		9	0
Mito HollyHock	2007	J2 League	38	2	2	0	-		40	2
Mito HollyHock	2008	J2 League	21	1	0	0	-		21	1
Career total			204	10	10	0	2	0	216	10
