= Shingo Kumabayashi =

Japanese footballer

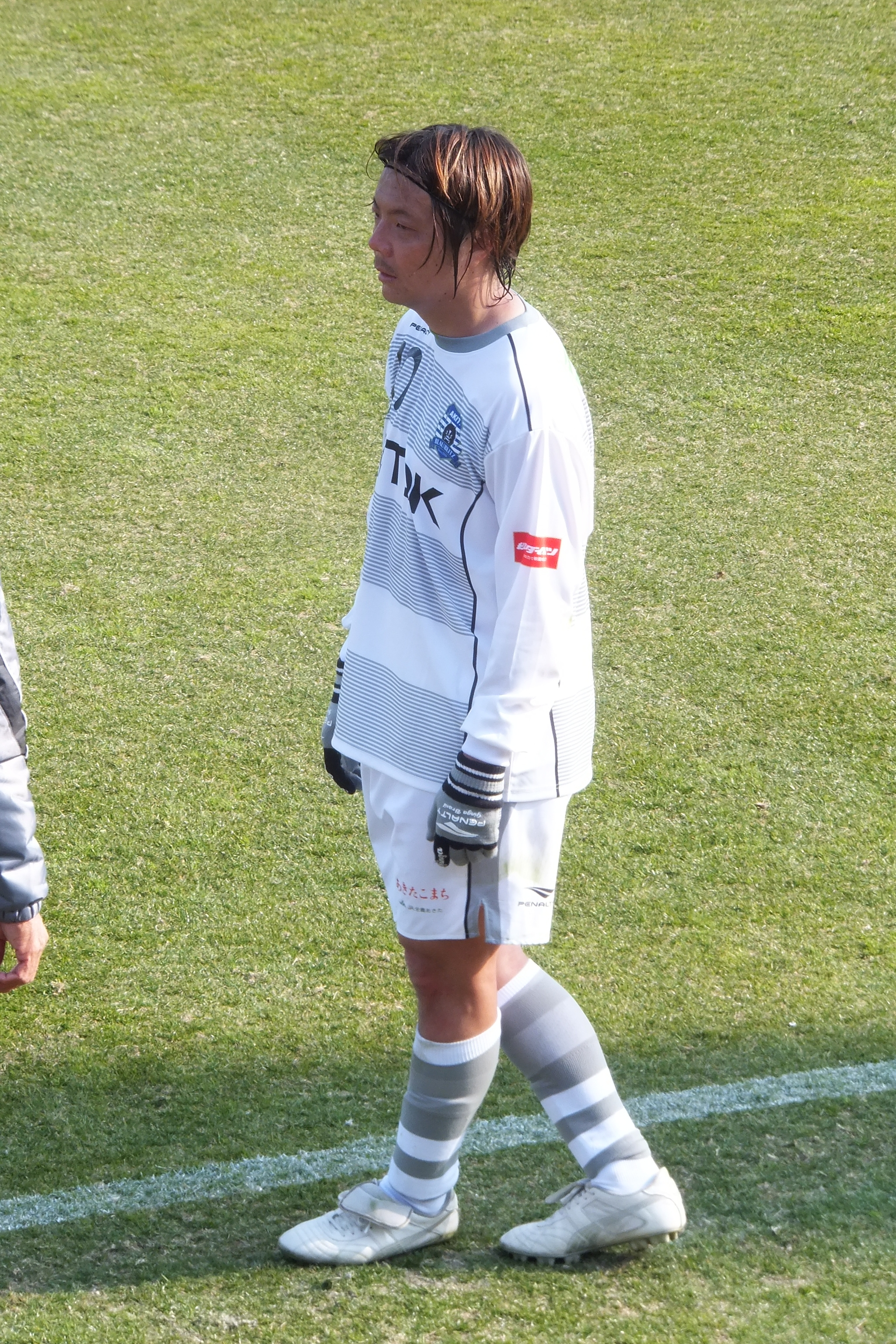

Personal information
- Full name: Shingo Kumabayashi
- Date of birth: June 23, 1981 (age 45)
- Place of birth: Asahikawa, Hokkaido, Japan
- Height: 1.69 m (5 ft 6 1/2 in)
- Position: Midfielder

Youth career
- 1997–1999: Akita Commercial High School

Senior career*
Years	Team	Apps	(Gls)
2000–2002	Júbilo Iwata	0	(0)
2002–2004	Shonan Bellmare	84	(3)
2005	Yokohama F. Marinos	8	(0)
2006–2007	Vegalta Sendai	47	(3)
2007	Tokushima Vortis	20	(0)
2008–2012	Thespa Kusatsu	181	(13)
2013–2015	Blaublitz Akita	75	(3)
Total		415	(22)
Medal record
Júbilo Iwata
Winner	J1 League	2002
Runner-up	J1 League	2001
Runner-up	J.League Cup	2001
- * Club domestic league appearances and goals

Shingo Kumabayashi (熊林 親吾, Kumabayashi Shingo; born June 23, 1981) is a former Japanese football player. He is the support coach J2 League club of Blaublitz Akita.

== Playing career ==
Kumabayashi was born in Asahikawa, Hokkaido on June 23, 1981, and raised in Akita, Akita. After graduating from high school, he joined the J1 League club Júbilo Iwata in 2000. However he was not played much, as their roster included many Japan national team players. In June 2002, he moved to the J2 League club Shonan Bellmare. He became a regular player as defensive midfielder immediately and played many matches until 2003. However his opportunity to play decreased in 2004. In 2005, he moved to the J1 club Yokohama F. Marinos, but was never put into play. In 2006, he moved to the J2 club Vegalta Sendai. He became a regular player as a defensive midfielder. However his opportunity to play decreased in 2006. In July 2006, he moved to the J2 club Tokushima Vortis and played many matches as a regular player. In 2008, he moved to the J2 club Thespa Kusatsu. He played many matches as a regular player over five seasons until 2012. In 2013, he moved to the Japan Football League club Blaublitz Akita based in his local area. He played as a regular player and the club was promoted to the new J3 League in 2014. He retired at the end of the 2015 season.

== Club statistics ==
Club performance			League		Cup		League Cup		Continental		Total	
Season	Club	League	Apps	Goals	Apps	Goals	Apps	Goals	Apps	Goals	Apps	Goals
Japan			League		Emperor's Cup		J.League Cup		Asia		Total	
2000	Júbilo Iwata	J1 League	0	0	0	0	0	0	-		0	0
2001	Júbilo Iwata	J1 League	0	0	0	0	0	0	-		0	0
2002	Júbilo Iwata	J1 League	0	0	0	0	0	0	-		0	0
2002	Shonan Bellmare	J2 League	28	2	4	0	-		-		32	2
2003	Shonan Bellmare	J2 League	37	1	4	2	-		-		41	3
2004	Shonan Bellmare	J2 League	19	0	0	0	-		-		19	0
2005	Yokohama F. Marinos	J1 League	8	0	0	0	1	0	2	0	11	0
2006	Vegalta Sendai	J2 League	41	2	1	0	-		-		42	2
2007	Vegalta Sendai	J2 League	6	1	0	0	-		-		6	1
2007	Tokushima Vortis	J2 League	20	0	2	0	-		-		22	0
2008	Thespa Kusatsu	J2 League	38	2	2	0	-		-		40	2
2009	Thespa Kusatsu	J2 League	45	4	2	0	-		-		47	4
2010	Thespa Kusatsu	J2 League	27	2	1	0	-		-		28	2
2011	Thespa Kusatsu	J2 League	37	4	1	0	-		-		38	4
2012	Thespa Kusatsu	J2 League	34	1	0	0	-		-		34	1
2013	Blaublitz Akita	Football League	32	1	2	0	-		-		34	1
2014	Blaublitz Akita	J3 League	31	2	2	0	-		-		33	2
2015	Blaublitz Akita	J3 League	12	0	0	0	-		-		12	0
Total			415	22	21	2	1	0	2	0	439	24
