= Daishi Kato =

Japanese footballer

Daishi Kato 加藤 大志
Personal information
- Full name: Daishi Kato
- Date of birth: July 26, 1983 (age 43)
- Place of birth: Asaka, Saitama, Japan
- Height: 1.65 m (5 ft 5 in)
- Position: Midfielder

Youth career
- 1999–2001: Toko Gakuen High School

Senior career*
| Years | Team | Apps | (Gls) |
| 2002–2004 | Shonan Bellmare | 94 | (1) |
| 2005–2008 | Kyoto Sanga FC | 72 | (5) |
| 2009 | Yokohama FC | 13 | (0) |
| Total | | 179 | (6) |
- * Club domestic league appearances and goals

Daishi Kato (加藤 大志, Katō Daishi; born July 26, 1983) is a former Japanese football player.

== Playing career ==
Kato was born in Asaka on . After graduating from high school, he joined J2 League club Shonan Bellmare in 2002. He played many matches as substitute midfielder in 3 seasons from first season. In 2005, he moved to J2 club Kyoto Purple Sanga (later Kyoto Sanga FC). He played many matches as substitute midfielder and Sanga won the champions in 2005 season. Sanga repeated relegation to J2 and promotion to J1 from 2006. His opportunity to play decreased year by year and he could hardly play in the match in 2008. In 2009, he moved to J2 club Yokohama FC. However he could not play many matches and retired end of 2009 season.

== Career statistics ==
Appearances and goals by club, season and competition
| Club | Season | League | | | Emperor's Cup | | J.League Cup | | Total | |
| Club | Season | Division | Apps | Goals | Apps | Goals | Apps | Goals | Apps | Goals |
|---|---|---|---|---|---|---|---|---|---|---|
| Shonan Bellmare | 2002 | J2 League | 23 | 0 | 4 | 1 | — | | 27 | 1 |
| Shonan Bellmare | 2003 | J2 League | 31 | 1 | 1 | 1 | — | | 32 | 2 |
| Shonan Bellmare | 2004 | J2 League | 40 | 0 | 3 | 0 | — | | 43 | 0 |
| Kyoto Purple Sanga | 2005 | J2 League | 39 | 4 | 1 | 0 | — | | 40 | 4 |
| Kyoto Purple Sanga | 2006 | J1 League | 21 | 1 | 1 | 0 | 3 | 1 | 25 | 2 |
| Kyoto Sanga FC | 2007 | J2 League | 12 | 0 | 1 | 0 | — | | 13 | 0 |
| Kyoto Sanga FC | 2008 | J1 League | 0 | 0 | 0 | 0 | 1 | 0 | 1 | 0 |
| Yokohama FC | 2009 | J2 League | 13 | 0 | 1 | 0 | — | | 14 | 0 |
| Career total | | | 179 | 6 | 12 | 2 | 4 | 1 | 195 | 9 |
