= Kazuhiko Tanabe =

Japanese footballer

Kazuhiko Tanabe 田辺 和彦
Personal information
- Full name: Kazuhiko Tanabe
- Date of birth: June 3, 1981 (age 45)
- Place of birth: Ishikawa, Japan
- Height: 1.75 m (5 ft 9 in)
- Position: Midfielder

Youth career
- 1997–1999: Bellmare Hiratsuka

Senior career*
Years	Team	Apps	(Gls)
1999–2003	Shonan Bellmare	41	(2)
2004–2006	Yokogawa Musashino	87	(3)
Total		128	(5)
- * Club domestic league appearances and goals

Kazuhiko Tanabe (田辺 和彦, Tanabe Kazuhiko; born June 3, 1981) is a former Japanese football player.

== Playing career ==
Tanabe was born in Ishikawa Prefecture on June 3, 1981. He joined the J1 League club Bellmare Hiratsuka (later Shonan Bellmare) from a youth team in 1999. On November 27, he debuted against Júbilo Iwata in the last match of the 1999 J1 League season. The club was relegated to the J2 League in 2000. He then played in many matches as an offensive midfielder. In 2004, he moved to the Japan Football League club Yokogawa Musashino. He became a regular player and played often over three seasons. He retired at the end of the 2006 season.

== Career statistics ==
Appearances and goals by club, season and competition
Club	Season	League			Emperor's Cup		J.League Cup		Total	
Club	Season	Division	Apps	Goals	Apps	Goals	Apps	Goals	Apps	Goals
Bellmare Hiratsuka	1999	J1 League	1	0	0	0	0	0	1	0
Shonan Bellmare	2000	J2 League	12	2	0	0	2	1	14	3
Shonan Bellmare	2001	J2 League	4	0	2	0	0	0	6	0
Shonan Bellmare	2002	J2 League	18	0	2	0	—		20	0
Shonan Bellmare	2003	J2 League	6	0	2	0	—		8	0
Yokogawa Musashino	2004	Football League	24	0	—		—		24	0
Yokogawa Musashino	2005	Football League	30	1	—		—		30	1
Yokogawa Musashino	2006	Football League	33	2	—		—		33	2
Career total			128	5	6	0	2	1	136	6
