= Shigekazu =

- Gender: Male

Origin
- Origin: Japanese
- Meaning: Different meanings depending on the kanji used

Shigekazu (written: 盛一 or 重和) is a masculine Japanese given name. Notable people with the name include:

- August S. Narumi, Bronze Wolf recipient
- Shigekazu Nakamura (中村 重和; born 1958), Japanese footballer and manager
- Shigekazu Ōmori (大森 盛一; born 1972), Japanese sprinter
- Shigekazu Shimazaki (嶋崎 重和; 1908–1945), Imperial Japanese Navy admiral and naval aviator
