= Masahito Suzuki (footballer) =

Japanese footballer

Masahito Suzuki 鈴木 正人
Personal information
- Full name: Masahito Suzuki
- Date of birth: April 28, 1977 (age 49)
- Place of birth: Chiba, Japan
- Height: 1.90 m (6 ft 3 in)
- Position: Goalkeeper

Youth career
- 1993–1995: Funabashi High School
- 1996–1999: Senshu University

Senior career*
Years	Team	Apps	(Gls)
2000–2005	Shonan Bellmare	86	(0)
2006–2009	Cerezo Osaka	0	(0)
2007	→Tokushima Vortis (loan)	22	(0)
Total		108	(0)
- * Club domestic league appearances and goals

Masahito Suzuki (鈴木 正人, Suzuki Masahito; born April 28, 1977) is a former Japanese football player.

== Playing career ==
Suzuki was born in Chiba Prefecture on April 28, 1977. After graduating from Senshu University, he joined J2 League club Shonan Bellmare in 2000. Although he could hardly play in the match behind Yuji Ito until 2001, he played many matches from 2002. However he could hardly play in the match behind Hiroki Kobayashi in 2005. In 2006, he moved to J1 League club Cerezo Osaka. However he could not play at all in the match behind Motohiro Yoshida and the club was relegated to J2 end of 2006 season. In 2007, he moved to J2 club Tokushima Vortis on loan. He battles with Torashi Shimazu for the position and he played many matches. In 2008, he returned to Cerezo Osaka. However he could not play at all in the match behind Takashi Aizawa, Hiromasa Yamamoto and Kim Jin-hyeon in 2 seasons and retired end of 2009 season.

== Career statistics ==
Appearances and goals by club, season and competition
Club	Season	League			Emperor's Cup		J.League Cup		Total	
Club	Season	Division	Apps	Goals	Apps	Goals	Apps	Goals	Apps	Goals
Shonan Bellmare	2000	J2 League	0	0	0	0	0	0	0	0
Shonan Bellmare	2001	J2 League	5	0	0	0	1	0	6	0
Shonan Bellmare	2002	J2 League	25	0	4	0	—		29	0
Shonan Bellmare	2003	J2 League	24	0	4	0	—		28	0
Shonan Bellmare	2004	J2 League	29	0	3	0	—		32	0
Shonan Bellmare	2005	J2 League	3	0	0	0	—		3	0
Cerezo Osaka	2006	J1 League	0	0	0	0	0	0	0	0
Tokushima Vortis	2007	J2 League	22	0	2	0	—		24	0
Cerezo Osaka	2008	J2 League	0	0	0	0	—		0	0
Cerezo Osaka	2009	J2 League	0	0	0	0	—		0	0
Career total			108	0	13	0	1	0	122	0
