= Takayoshi Toda =

Japanese footballer

Takayoshi Toda 戸田 賢良
Personal information
- Full name: Takayoshi Toda
- Date of birth: December 8, 1979 (age 46)
- Place of birth: Miyakonojo, Miyazaki, Japan
- Height: 1.85 m (6 ft 1 in)
- Position: Defender

Youth career
- 1995–1997: Miyakonojo Izumigaoka High School
- 1998–2001: University of Teacher Education Fukuoka

Senior career*
Years	Team	Apps	(Gls)
2002–2006	Shonan Bellmare	108	(9)
2007–2008	Gainare Tottori	51	(5)
Total		159	(14)
- * Club domestic league appearances and goals

Takayoshi Toda (戸田 賢良, Toda Takayoshi; born December 8, 1979) is a former Japanese football player. His elder brother Mitsuhiro Toda is also a former footballer.

== Playing career ==
Toda was born in Miyakonojo on December 8, 1979. After graduating from University of Teacher Education Fukuoka, he joined J2 League club Shonan Bellmare in 2002. He played many matches as forward from first season. However his opportunity to play decreased in 2004. He was converted to center back and played many matches in 2005. However he could not play many matches in 2006. In 2007, he moved to Japan Football League club Gainare Tottori. He played many matches as center back in 2 seasons. He retired at the end of the 2008 season.

== Career statistics ==
Appearances and goals by club, season and competition
Club	Season	League			Emperor's Cup		Total	
Club	Season	Division	Apps	Goals	Apps	Goals	Apps	Goals
Shonan Bellmare	2002	J2 League	22	3	3	4	25	7
Shonan Bellmare	2003	J2 League	26	5	0	0	26	5
Shonan Bellmare	2004	J2 League	19	0	2	0	21	0
Shonan Bellmare	2005	J2 League	32	1	0	0	32	1
Shonan Bellmare	2006	J2 League	9	0	0	0	9	0
Gainare Tottori	2007	Football League	31	3	2	0	33	3
Gainare Tottori	2008	Football League	20	2	0	0	20	2
Career total			159	14	7	4	166	18
