= Koji Nakazato =

Japanese footballer

Koji Nakazato 中里 宏司
Personal information
- Full name: Koji Nakazato
- Date of birth: April 24, 1982 (age 44)
- Place of birth: Kamakura, Japan
- Height: 1.76 m (5 ft 9 1/2 in)
- Position: Midfielder

Youth career
- 1998–2000: Shonan Bellmare

Senior career*
Years	Team	Apps	(Gls)
2000–2007	Shonan Bellmare	116	(3)
2006	→ Sanfrecce Hiroshima (loan)	12	(0)
Total		128	(3)
- * Club domestic league appearances and goals

Koji Nakazato (中里 宏司, Nakazato Koji; born April 24, 1982) is a former Japanese football player.

== Playing career ==
Nakazato was born in Kamakura on April 24, 1982. He joined J2 League club Shonan Bellmare based in his local youth team in 2000. He debuted in 2000 and became a regular player as a side midfielder in 2001. However he injured his shoulder and could hardly play in the match in 2002.

Although he played many matches as a defensive midfielder from 2003, he injured his left knee in June 2004. Although he came back in 2005, he could not play many matches. In 2006, he moved to J1 League club Sanfrecce Hiroshima on loan. He played many matches as a substitute in the summer. In 2007, he returned to Shonan Bellmare. He retired end of the 2007 season.

== Career statistics ==
Appearances and goals by club, season and competition
Club	Season	League			Emperor's Cup		J.League Cup		Total	
Club	Season	Division	Apps	Goals	Apps	Goals	Apps	Goals	Apps	Goals
Shonan Bellmare	2000	J2 League	6	0	3	0	0	0	9	0
Shonan Bellmare	2001	J2 League	31	1	2	0	1	0	34	1
Shonan Bellmare	2002	J2 League	4	0	2	0	—		6	0
Shonan Bellmare	2003	J2 League	29	2	4	0	—		33	2
Shonan Bellmare	2004	J2 League	16	0	0	0	—		16	0
Shonan Bellmare	2005	J2 League	13	0	0	0	—		13	0
Shonan Bellmare	2007	J2 League	17	0	0	0	—		17	0
Shonan Bellmare	Total		116	3	11	0	1	0	128	3
Sanfrecce Hiroshima (loan)	2006	J1 League	12	0	1	0	2	0	15	0
Career total			128	3	12	0	3	0	143	3
