= Yasunori Takada =

Japanese footballer

Yasunori Takada 高田 保則
Personal information
- Full name: Yasunori Takada
- Date of birth: February 22, 1979 (age 47)
- Place of birth: Yokohama, Japan
- Height: 1.76 m (5 ft 9 1/2 in)
- Position: Forward

Youth career
- 1994–1996: Bellmare Hiratsuka

Senior career*
Years	Team	Apps	(Gls)
1997–2005	Shonan Bellmare	239	(43)
2005	Yokohama FC	8	(1)
2006–2010	Thespa Kusatsu	193	(35)
Total		440	(79)

International career
1999	Japan U-20	3	(0)
Medal record
Representing Japan
FIFA U-20 World Cup
Silver medal – second place	1999 Nigeria
- * Club domestic league appearances and goals

Yasunori Takada (高田 保則, Takada Yasunori; born February 22, 1979) is a former Japanese football player.

== Club career ==
Takada was born in Yokohama on February 22, 1979. He joined Bellmare Hiratsuka (later Shonan Bellmare) from youth team in 1997. He debuted in 1998. From 1999, he played many matches in the team with many young players for due to financial strain end of 1998 season. The club was relegated to J2 League end of 1999 season. He became a regular player from 2001. However his opportunity to play decreased in 2005 and he moved to Yokohama FC in September 2005. In 2006, he moved to Thespa Kusatsu and played as regular player. He retired end of 2010 season.

== National team career ==
In April 1999, Takada was selected Japan U-20 national team for 1999 World Youth Championship. At this tournament, he played 3 matches and Japan won the 2nd place.

== Career statistics ==
Appearances and goals by club, season and competition
Club	Season	League			Emperor's Cup		J.League Cup		Total	
Club	Season	Division	Apps	Goals	Apps	Goals	Apps	Goals	Apps	Goals
Bellmare Hiratsuka	1997	J1 League	0	0	0	0	0	0	0	0
Bellmare Hiratsuka	1998	J1 League	13	0	0	0	0	0	13	0
Bellmare Hiratsuka	1999	J1 League	20	3	0	0	0	0	20	3
Shonan Bellmare	2000	J2 League	25	4	3	1	2	0	30	5
Shonan Bellmare	2001	J2 League	41	17	2	0	2	0	45	17
Shonan Bellmare	2002	J2 League	42	9	4	1	—		46	10
Shonan Bellmare	2003	J2 League	39	3	3	0	—		42	3
Shonan Bellmare	2004	J2 League	41	6	3	1	—		44	7
Shonan Bellmare	2005	J2 League	18	1	0	0	—		18	1
Yokohama FC	2005	J2 League	8	1	1	0	—		9	1
Thespa Kusatsu	2006	J2 League	47	12	2	3	—		49	15
Thespa Kusatsu	2007	J2 League	43	9	2	0	—		45	9
Thespa Kusatsu	2008	J2 League	36	8	3	2	—		39	10
Thespa Kusatsu	2009	J2 League	34	2	1	1	—		35	3
Thespa Kusatsu	2010	J2 League	33	4	1	0	—		34	4
Career total			440	79	25	9	4	0	469	88

== Honors and awards ==
- FIFA World Youth Championship runner-up: 1999
