= Santos (footballer, born 1983) =

Brazilian footballer

Personal information
- Full name: Rafael dos Santos Franciscatti
- Date of birth: April 9, 1983 (age 43)
- Place of birth: Brazil
- Height: 1.76 m (5 ft 9 1/2 in)
- Position: Midfielder

Senior career*
| Years | Team | Apps | (Gls) |
| 2003 | Shonan Bellmare | 1 | (0) |
- * Club domestic league appearances and goals

Rafael dos Santos Franciscatti (born April 9, 1983) is a former Brazilian football player.

== Club statistics ==
| Club performance | | | League | | Cup | | Total | |
| Season | Club | League | Apps | Goals | Apps | Goals | Apps | Goals |
| Japan | | | League | | Emperor's Cup | | Total | |
|---|---|---|---|---|---|---|---|---|
| 2003 | Shonan Bellmare | J2 League | 1 | 0 | 0 | 0 | 1 | 0 |
| Total | | | 1 | 0 | 0 | 0 | 1 | 0 |
