= Marlon (footballer, born 1976) =

Brazilian footballer

Personal information
- Full name: Marlon de Souza Lopes
- Date of birth: September 5, 1976 (age 50)
- Place of birth: Curitiba, Brazil
- Height: 1.86 m (6 ft 1 in)
- Position: Striker

Senior career*
Years	Team	Apps	(Gls)
2002	Kawasaki Frontale		
- * Club domestic league appearances and goals

Marlon de Souza Lopes (born September 5, 1976) is a Brazilian football player.

== Club statistics ==
Club performance			League		Cup		Total	
Season	Club	League	Apps	Goals	Apps	Goals	Apps	Goals
Japan			League		Emperor's Cup		Total	
2002	Kawasaki Frontale	J2 League	23	12	0	0	23	12
Total			23	12	0	0	23	12
