= Kazuma Kita =

Japanese footballer

Personal information
- Date of birth: December 21, 1981 (age 44)
- Place of birth: Ishikawa, Japan
- Height: 1.94 m (6 ft 4 1/2 in)
- Position: Goalkeeper

Youth career
- 2000–2003: Kokushikan University

Senior career*
Years	Team	Apps	(Gls)
2004–2015	Thespakusatsu Gunma	153	(0)
Total		153	(0)
- * Club domestic league appearances and goals

Kazuma Kita (北 一真, Kita Kazuma; born December 21, 1981) is a former Japanese football player.

== Club statistics ==
Club performance			League		Cup		Total	
Season	Club	League	Apps	Goals	Apps	Goals	Apps	Goals
Japan			League		Emperor's Cup		Total	
2000	Kokushikan University	Football League	2	0			2	0
2001	Kokushikan University	Football League	20	0			20	0
2002	Kokushikan University	Football League	0	0			0	0
2003	Kokushikan University	Football League	7	0			7	0
2004	Thespa Kusatsu	Football League	5	0	1	0	6	0
2005	Thespa Kusatsu	J2 League	0	0	0	0	0	0
2006	Thespa Kusatsu	J2 League	0	0	0	0	0	0
2007	Thespa Kusatsu	J2 League	0	0	1	0	1	0
2008	Thespa Kusatsu	J2 League	7	0	0	0	7	0
2009	Thespa Kusatsu	J2 League	22	0	0	0	22	0
2010	Thespa Kusatsu	J2 League						
Country	Japan		65	0	2	0	67	0
Total			65	0	2	0	67	0
