= Silva (footballer, born 1981) =

Brazilian footballer

Personal information
- Full name: Kleber Rogério do Carmo Silva
- Date of birth: April 14, 1981 (age 45)
- Place of birth: Brazil
- Height: 1.80 m (5 ft 11 in)
- Position: Midfielder

Senior career*
Years	Team	Apps	(Gls)
2002	Shonan Bellmare	16	(1)
- * Club domestic league appearances and goals

Kleber Rogério do Carmo Silva (born April 14, 1981) is a former Brazilian football player.

== Club statistics ==
Club performance			League		Cup		Total	
Season	Club	League	Apps	Goals	Apps	Goals	Apps	Goals
Japan			League		Emperor's Cup		Total	
2002	Shonan Bellmare	J2 League	16	1	0	0	16	1
Total			16	1	0	0	16	1
