= Samir (football manager) =

Moroccan footballer and manager

Personal information
- Full name: Ajam Boujarari Mohammed
- Date of birth: 3 April 1961 (age 65)
- Place of birth: Morocco

Managerial career
- Years: Team
- 1998–2002: Japan (assistant)
- 2003: Shonan Bellmare

Ajam Boujarari Mohammed (born 3 April 1961), known as Samir, is a Moroccan professional football manager.

== Coaching career ==
In 1998, Samir became assistant coach for Japan national football team under manager Philippe Troussier. After the 2002 FIFA World Cup, he became manager for J2 League club Shonan Bellmare in the 2003 season, but resigned on 25 May 2003.

== Managerial statistics ==
Team	In	Record				
Team	In	G	W	D	L	Win %
Shonan Bellmare	2003	14	3	1	10	21.43
Total		14	3	1	10	21.43
