= Daniel Gigante =

Brazilian footballer (born 1981)

Personal information
- Full name: Daniel Carvalho da Silva
- Date of birth: March 10, 1981 (age 45)
- Place of birth: São Paulo, Brazil
- Position: Defender

Senior career*
Years	Team	Apps	(Gls)
2010	Atlético Sorocaba	7	(0)
2010	Thespa Kusatsu	6	(0)
2011	Concórdia	8	(0)
2011–2012	Santo André	10	(2)
2012	Rio Verde	7	(0)
2012	Sobradinho	5	(0)
2013	Comercial	9	(0)
2014	Mirassol	19	(6)
2014	Penapolense	4	(1)
2014–2016	Oeste	56	(3)
2016	São Bento	14	(0)
2017	Sertãozinho	4	(0)
2017–2018	Oeste	5	(0)
- * Club domestic league appearances and goals

Daniel Carvalho da Silva (born March 10, 1981), known as Daniel Gigante, is a Brazilian football player.

== Career ==
Daniel Gigante has played professionally for Thespa Kusatsu in Japan.

== Club statistics ==
Club performance			League		Cup		Total	
Season	Club	League	Apps	Goals	Apps	Goals	Apps	Goals
Japan			League		Emperor's Cup		Total	
2010	Thespa Kusatsu	J2 League	6	0	0	0	6	0
Country	Japan		6	0	0	0	6	0
Total			6	0	0	0	6	0
