= Tsutomu Kitade =

Japanese footballer (born 1976)

Tsutomu Kitade 北出 勉
Personal information
- Full name: Tsutomu Kitade
- Date of birth: September 18, 1978 (age 48)
- Place of birth: Sapporo, Hokkaido, Japan
- Height: 1.76 m (5 ft 9 1/2 in)
- Position: Defender

Youth career
- 1994–1996: Muroran Otani High School
- 1997–2000: Dohto University

Senior career*
Years	Team	Apps	(Gls)
2001–2002	Júbilo Iwata	0	(0)
2003–2005	Shonan Bellmare	39	(2)
2006–2007	Tochigi SC	22	(1)
Total		61	(3)
Medal record
Júbilo Iwata
Winner	J1 League	2002
Runner-up	J1 League	2001
Runner-up	J.League Cup	2001
- * Club domestic league appearances and goals

Tsutomu Kitade (北出 勉, Kitade Tsutomu; born September 18, 1976) is a former Japanese football player.

== Playing career ==
Kitade was born in Sapporo on September 18, 1976. After graduating from Dohto University, he joined the J1 League club Júbilo Iwata in 2001. However he did not play much, as the team had many national team players, such as Hideto Suzuki, Makoto Tanaka, and Go Oiwa. In 2003, he moved to the J2 League club Shonan Bellmare. He played as a right back in a three-back defense. However he could not play at all in 2005. In 2006, he moved to the Japan Football League club Tochigi SC. He did not play much in 2006, and played more often in 2007. He retired at the end of the 2007 season.

== Club statistics ==
Club performance			League		Cup		League Cup		Total	
Season	Club	League	Apps	Goals	Apps	Goals	Apps	Goals	Apps	Goals
Japan			League		Emperor's Cup		J.League Cup		Total	
2001	Júbilo Iwata	J1 League	0	0	0	0	0	0	0	0
2002	Júbilo Iwata	J1 League	0	0	0	0	0	0	0	0
2003	Shonan Bellmare	J2 League	15	0	4	0	-		19	0
2004	Shonan Bellmare	J2 League	24	2	3	0	-		27	2
2005	Shonan Bellmare	J2 League	0	0	0	0	-		0	0
2006	Tochigi SC	Football League	8	0	2	0	-		10	0
2007	Tochigi SC	Football League	14	1	0	0	-		14	1
Career total			61	3	9	0	0	0	70	3
