= Rui Tokisaki =

Japanese footballer

Personal information
- Full name: Rui Tokisaki
- Date of birth: October 30, 1982 (age 43)
- Place of birth: Fukushima, Japan
- Height: 1.80 m (5 ft 11 in)
- Position: Defender

Youth career
- 2001–2004: Meiji University

Senior career*
Years	Team	Apps	(Gls)
2007–2014	Fukushima United FC	101	(52)
Total		101	(52)
- * Club domestic league appearances and goals

Rui Tokisaki (時崎 塁, Tokisaki Rui; born October 30, 1982) is a former Japanese football player. His brother is Yu Tokisaki

== Playing career ==
Rui Tokisaki played for Fukushima United FC from 2007 to 2014.
