= Michiaki Kakimoto =

Japanese footballer (born 1977)

Michiaki Kakimoto 柿本 倫明
Personal information
- Full name: Michiaki Kakimoto
- Date of birth: October 6, 1977 (age 49)
- Place of birth: Miyako, Fukuoka, Japan
- Height: 1.84 m (6 ft 1/2 in)
- Position: Forward

Youth career
- 1993–1995: Hokoku Gakuen High School
- 1996–1999: Osaka University of Health and Sport Sciences

Senior career*
Years	Team	Apps	(Gls)
2000	Avispa Fukuoka	0	(0)
2001	Clementi Khalsa	29	(14)
2002–2003	Oita Trinita	15	(0)
2003–2007	Shonan Bellmare	115	(28)
2006	→Cerezo Osaka (loan)	25	(1)
2008–2010	Matsumoto Yamaga FC	55	(33)
Total		239	(76)
- * Club domestic league appearances and goals

Michiaki Kakimoto (柿本 倫明, Kakimoto Michiaki; born October 6, 1977) is a former Japanese football player.

== Playing career ==
Kakimoto was born in Miyako, Fukuoka on October 6, 1977. After graduating from Osaka University of Health and Sport Sciences, he joined the J1 League club Avispa Fukuoka in 2000. He was not put into play in any matches and in 2001, he moved to Singapore and joined Clementi Khalsa. In 2002, he returned to Japan and joined the J2 League club Oita Trinita. Although the club was promoted to J1 in 2003, he did not play much over the next two seasons. In June 2003, he moved to the J2 club Shonan Bellmare. He became a regular player and scored many goals. In 2006, he moved to the J1 club Cerezo Osaka on loan. Although he played often as a substitute forward, he did not score any goals and the club was relegated to J2 at the end of the 2006 season. In 2007, he returned to Shonan Bellmare. However he still did not play often. In 2008, he moved to the Regional Leagues club Matsumoto Yamaga FC. He played as a regular player and scored many goals in the 2008 and 2009 seasons. The club was also promoted to the Japan Football League in 2010. He retired at the end of the 2010 season.

== Club statistics ==
Club performance			League		Cup		League Cup		Total	
Season	Club	League	Apps	Goals	Apps	Goals	Apps	Goals	Apps	Goals
Japan			League		Emperor's Cup		J.League Cup		Total	
2000	Avispa Fukuoka	J1 League	0	0	0	0	0	0	0	0
Singapore			League		Singapore Cup		League Cup		Total	
2001	Clementi Khalsa	S.League	29	14	1	0	-		30	14
Japan			League		Emperor's Cup		J.League Cup		Total	
2002	Oita Trinita	J2 League	14	0	1	0	-		15	0
2003	Oita Trinita	J1 League	1	0	0	0	0	0	1	0
2003	Shonan Bellmare	J2 League	22	3	4	3	-		26	6
2004	Shonan Bellmare	J2 League	40	10	3	0	-		43	10
2005	Shonan Bellmare	J2 League	43	15	1	0	-		44	15
2006	Cerezo Osaka	J1 League	25	1	1	0	7	1	33	2
2007	Shonan Bellmare	J2 League	10	0	0	0	-		10	0
2008	Matsumoto Yamaga FC	Regional Leagues	12	12	4	4	-		16	16
2009	Matsumoto Yamaga FC	Regional Leagues	13	11	3	2	-		16	13
2010	Matsumoto Yamaga FC	Football League	30	10	1	0	-		31	10
Total	Japan		210	62	18	9	7	1	235	72
Total	Singapore		29	14	1	0	-		30	14
Career total			239	76	19	9	7	1	265	86
