= Kim Geun-chol =

South Korean footballer

Kim Geun-Chol
Personal information
- Full name: Kim Geun-Chol
- Date of birth: June 24, 1983 (age 43)
- Place of birth: Seongnam, Gyeonggi Province, South Korea
- Height: 1.77 m (5 ft 10 in)
- Position: Centre midfielder

Youth career
- Pai Chai University

Senior career*
Years	Team	Apps	(Gls)
2002	Júbilo Iwata	0	(0)
2003–2004	Shonan Bellmare	74	(4)
2005	Daegu FC	3	(0)
2006–2009	Gyeongnam FC	55	(2)
2010–2011	Busan I'Park	28	(2)
2012	Chunnam Dragons	13	(0)
2013	Gwangju FC	0	(0)
2013	Shenyang Shenbei	28	(0)
2014–2017	PTT Rayong	24	(5)

International career^{‡}
2003	South Korea U-20	4	(0)
- * Club domestic league appearances and goals as of 19 December 2012 ‡ National team caps and goals as of 10 October 2009

Kim Geun-Chol (born June 24, 1983) is a South Korean footballer who plays for PTT Rayong in the Thai Division 1 League. He was regarded as one of the decent young midfielders. And he had a competitive relationship with Daejeon Citizen midfielder Kwon Jip, who had a role of playmaker in Dongbuk High school.

Kim previously played for Shonan Bellmare in the J2 League.

== Club statistics ==
Club performance			League		Cup		League Cup		Continental		Total	
Season	Club	League	Apps	Goals	Apps	Goals	Apps	Goals	Apps	Goals	Apps	Goals
Japan			League		Emperor's Cup		J.League Cup		Asia		Total	
2002	Júbilo Iwata	J1 League	0	0	0	0	0	0	-		0	0
2003	Shonan Bellmare	J2 League	41	1	1	0	-		-		42	1
2004	Shonan Bellmare	J2 League	33	3	1	0	-		-		34	3
South Korea			League		KFA Cup		League Cup		Asia		Total	
2005	Daegu FC	K-League	3	0	1	0	4	0	-		8	0
2006	Gyeongnam FC	K-League	16	1	2	0	9	2	-		27	2
2007	Gyeongnam FC	K-League	21	1	2	0	6	0	-		29	1
2008	Gyeongnam FC	K-League	13	0	2	0	4	1	-		19	1
2009	Gyeongnam FC	K-League	5	0	0	0	0	0	-		5	0
2010	Busan I'Park	K-League	25	2	5	0	5	0	-		35	2
2011	Busan I'Park	K-League	3	0	0	0	3	0	-		6	0
2012	Chunnam Dragons	K-League	13	0	1	0	-		-		14	0
Country	Japan	K-League	74	4	2	0	0	0	-		76	4
Country	Korea Republic		99	4	13	0	31	3	-		143	7
Total			173	8	15	0	31	3	-		219	11

== Club honours ==
At Gyeongnam FC

- Hauzen Cup third place: 1

2006

- Korean FA Cup runner-up: 1

2008
