= Fuat Usta =

Turkish footballer (born 1972)

Personal information
- Date of birth: 3 July 1972 (age 54)
- Place of birth: Samsun, Turkey
- Position: Midfielder

Youth career
- Rapid
- MVV'02

Senior career*
Years	Team	Apps	(Gls)
1990–1998	Fortuna Sittard	103	(15)
1995–1997	→ Beşiktaş (loan)	6	(0)
1998–1999	Cambuur	21	(0)
1999–2000	Sparta	9	(2)
2001	Jokerit	6	(0)
2001–2002	MVV	13	(0)
2002	Omiya Ardija	16	(0)
2003	MVV Maastricht	15	(0)
2006–2007	Fortuna Sittard	1	(0)
Total		190	(17)

Managerial career
- 2007–2010: Fortuna Sittard (assistant)
- 2010–2011: Turkey B
- 2010–2011: Turkey (assistant)
- 2017–2018: MVV Maastricht (assistant)
- 2019–2020: MVV Maastricht
- * Club domestic league appearances and goals

Fuat Usta (born 3 July 1972) is a Turkish football coach and former professional player.

== Playing career ==
Usta played as a midfielder in the Netherlands, Turkey, Finland, and Japan with Rapid, MVV'02, Fortuna Sittard, Beşiktaş, Cambuur, Sparta, Jokerit, MVV and Omiya Ardija.

Usta left MVV in August 2002 to sign with Japanese club Omiya Ardija until the end of the 2002 season. He returned to MVV in January 2003, on an amateur contract.

== Coaching career ==
After three years working as an assistant manager of Fortuna Sittard, in July 2010 he was appointed by Guus Hiddink to be an assistant coach of the Turkey national team. He was also responsible for the U23 team. In October 2012 he moved with Hiddink to Russian club Anzhi Makhachkala, where he became head of youth education. He left Anzhi in 2017.

In the 2016–17 season, Usta did an internship at MVV Maastricht to complete his UEFA Pro course at the KNVB in May 2018. In the 2017–18 season, he worked as assistant manager for the club. Ahead of the 2019–20 season signed a one-year contract as the club's new manager. His contract was not renewed for the 2020–21 season.
