= Shigekazu Nakamura =

Japanese footballer and manager

Shigekazu Nakamura 中村 重和
Personal information
- Full name: Shigekazu Nakamura
- Date of birth: July 30, 1958 (age 68)
- Place of birth: Shimabara, Nagasaki, Japan
- Height: 1.75 m (5 ft 9 in)
- Position: Defender

Youth career
- 1974–1976: Shimabara Commercial High School
- 1977–1980: Osaka University of Commerce

Senior career*
Years	Team	Apps	(Gls)
1981–1991	Mazda		

Managerial career
- 2002: Avispa Fukuoka
Medal record
Mazda
Runner-up	Emperor's Cup	1987
- * Club domestic league appearances and goals

Shigekazu Nakamura (中村 重和, Nakamura Shigekazu; born July 30, 1958) is a former Japanese football player and manager.

== Playing career ==
Nakamura was born in Shimabara on July 30, 1958. After graduating from Osaka University of Commerce, he played for Mazda (later Sanfrecce Hiroshima) from 1981 to 1991.

== Coaching career ==
After retirement, Nakamura started coaching career at Mazda from 1991. He mainly managed youth team until August 2002. In August 2002, he moved to Avispa Fukuoka and became a manager. In 2003, he became a general manager and he left the club in 2007.

== Managerial statistics ==
Team	From	To	Record				
Team	From	To	G	W	D	L	Win %
Avispa Fukuoka	2002	2002	20	2	5	13	10.00
Total			20	2	5	13	10.00
