= Matsuichi Yamada =

Japanese footballer and manager

Matsuichi Yamada 山田 松市
Personal information
- Full name: Matsuichi Yamada
- Date of birth: February 21, 1961 (age 65)
- Place of birth: Numazu, Shizuoka, Japan
- Height: 1.74 m (5 ft 8 1/2 in)
- Position: Midfielder

Youth career
- 1976–1978: Nihon University Mishima High School

College career
Years	Team	Apps	(Gls)
1979–1982	Kokushikan University		

Senior career*
Years	Team	Apps	(Gls)
1983–1990	Honda	51	(8)
Total		51	(8)

Managerial career
- 2003–2004: Shonan Bellmare
- 2010–2014: Vanraure Hachinohe
- * Club domestic league appearances and goals

Matsuichi Yamada (山田 松市, Yamada Matsuichi; born February 21, 1961) is a former Japanese football player and manager.

== Playing career ==
Yamada was born in Numazu on February 21, 1961. After graduating from Kokushikan University, he joined Honda in 1983. He retired in 1990.

== Coaching career ==
After retirement, Yamada coached at Honda from 1990 to 1992. In 1992, he moved to Yamaha Motors (later Júbilo Iwata) and coached until 2001. In 2002, he moved to Shonan Bellmare. In May 2003, he became manager as Samir's successor and managed until July 2004. In 2010, he signed with Vanraure Hachinohe and managed until 2014.

== Managerial statistics ==
Team	From	To	Record				
Team	From	To	G	W	D	L	Win %
Shonan Bellmare	2003	2004	52	11	17	24	21.15
Total			52	11	17	24	21.15
