= Marcus Vinícius (footballer, born 1974) =

Brazilian footballer

Personal information
- Full name: Marcus Vinícius de Morais
- Date of birth: February 25, 1974 (age 52)
- Place of birth: São Paulo, Brazil
- Height: 1.76 m (5 ft 9 in)
- Position: Midfielder

Senior career*
Years	Team	Apps	(Gls)
1997	Guarani-VA		
1997–1999	Honda	60	(56)
2000	Rio Branco-SP		
2000	Guarani	15	(2)
2001	Rio Branco-SP	19	(5)
2001	Bahia	19	(5)
2002	América		
2002–2003	Albirex Niigata	77	(51)
2004–2006	Kawasaki Frontale	76	(30)
2006	Tokyo Verdy	25	(5)
2007	Yokohama F. Marinos	2	(0)
2007–2008	Vitória		

Managerial career
- 2015: São José-SP
- * Club domestic league appearances and goals

Marcus Vinicius de Morais (born February 25, 1974) known by his given name, Marcus, is a Brazilian football player in Japan. He led all J2 League players in goals scored in the 2002 and 2003 season.

== Career ==
Marcus Vinícius began playing football with São José Esporte Clube. He played for several Brazilian and Japanese clubs before finishing his career with São José in 2009.

While playing for Rio Branco Esporte Clube, Marcus Vinícius was the leading goal-scorer of the 2000 Campeonato Paulista with nine goals before suffering a knee injury.

After he retired from playing, Marcus Vinícius became a manager. He led São José during the 2015 Campeonato Paulista Série A3.

== Career statistics ==
Appearances and goals by club, season and competition
Club	Season	League			National cup (Note: Includes Emperor's Cup.)		League cup (Note: Includes J.League Cup.)		Total	
Club	Season	Division	Apps	Goals	Apps	Goals	Apps	Goals	Apps	Goals
Honda	1997	Football League	12	10	0	0	1	0	13	10
Honda	1998	Football League	26	24	3	3	–		29	27
Honda	1999	Football League	22	22	3	5	–		25	27
Albirex Niigata	2002	J2 League	36	19	3	1	–		39	20
Albirex Niigata	2003	J2 League	41	32	0	0	–		41	32
Kawasaki Frontale	2004	J2 League	37	18	3	1	–		40	19
Kawasaki Frontale	2005	J1 League	27	9	3	1	2	1	32	11
Kawasaki Frontale	2006	J1 League	12	3	0	0	8	4	20	7
Tokyo Verdy	2006	J2 League	25	5	1	0	–		26	5
Yokohama F. Marinos	2007	J1 League	2	0	0	0	1	0	3	0
Total			240	142	16	11	12	5	268	158
