= Ever Palacios =

Colombian footballer (born 1969)

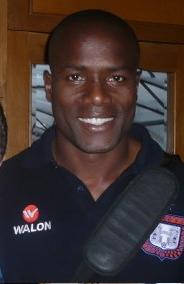

Personal information
- Full name: Ever Antonio Palacios
- Date of birth: 18 January 1969 (age 57)
- Place of birth: Apartadó, Colombia
- Height: 1.86 m (6 ft 1 in)
- Position: Defender

Senior career*
Years	Team	Apps	(Gls)
1987–1998	Deportivo Cali		
1997	L.D.U. Quito		
1998–1999	Atlético Nacional		
2000	Atlético Junior	41	(4)
2001–2004	Shonan Bellmare	124	(9)
2004	Kashiwa Reysol	7	(0)
2005–2011	Boyacá Chicó	172	(15)

International career
1997–1998	Colombia	10	(1)

Managerial career
- 2015: Gavião Kyikatejê
- * Club domestic league appearances and goals

Ever Antonio Palacios (born 18 January 1969) is a Colombian football coach and former player who played for clubs including Deportivo Cali, Atlético Nacional, Atlético Junior, Shonan Bellmare (Japan), Kashiwa Reysol (Japan) and Boyacá Chicó.

== Career ==
Palacios played club football with Boyacá Chicó into his forties, making him one of the oldest players in Colombian league history.

Palacios played for the Colombia national football team and was a member of the national team competing at the 1998 FIFA World Cup.

== International statistics ==
Colombia national team
Year	Apps	Goals
1997	3	1
1998	7	0
Total	10	1
