= J2 League =

- Organising body: J.League
- Founded: 1999; 27 years ago
- Country: Japan
- Confederation: AFC
- Number of clubs: 20
- Level on pyramid: 2
- Promotion to: J1 League
- Relegation to: J3 League
- Domestic cup: Emperor's Cup
- League cup: J.League Cup
- Current champions: Mito HollyHock (1st title) (2025)
- Most championships: Hokkaido Consadole Sapporo (3 titles)
- Broadcaster(s): DAZN
- Website: jleague.jp (in English)
- Current: 2026–27 J2 League

The J2 League (Japanese: J2リーグ, Hepburn: J2 Rīgu) or simply J2 is the second division of the Japan Professional Football League (日本プロサッカーリーグ, Nihon Puro Sakkā Rīgu) and the second level of the Japanese association football league system. The top tier is represented by the J1 League. It (along with the rest of the J.League) is currently sponsored by Meiji Yasuda Life and it is thus officially known as the Meiji Yasuda J2 League (明治安田J2リーグ). Until the 2014 season it was named the J.League Division 2.

Second-tier club football has existed in Japan since 1972 during the Japan Soccer League era; however, it was only professionalized during the 1999 season with ten clubs. The league took one relegating club from the top division and nine clubs from the second-tier semi-professional former JFL to create the J2 League. The remaining seven clubs in the Japan Football League, the newly formed Yokohama FC, and one promoting club from the Regional Leagues, formed the nine-club JFL, then the third tier of Japanese football. The third tier is now represented by the J3 League.

== History ==
=== Phases of Japanese second-tier association football ===
==== Amateur era (until 1999) ====
A national second tier of Japanese association football was first established in 1972, when the JSL formed a Second Division. Among the founding 10 clubs, five later competed in the J.League: Toyota Motors (inaugural champions), Yomiuri, Fujitsu, Kyoto Shiko Club and Kofu Club. Like the First Division, the new division also consisted of 10 clubs, and initially required both the champions and runners-up teams to play off a promotion/relegation series of test matches against the top flight's bottom clubs. The requirement was abolished for the champions in 1980, and for the runners-up in 1984.

Prior to 1977, the way for clubs to gain access to the Second Division was by making the finals of the All Japan Senior Football Championship and then playing off in their own promotion/relegation series against the second tier's bottom clubs. After 1977, the new Regional Football League Competition served as provider of aspiring League clubs. In 1985, the Second Division increased to 12 clubs and in 1986, the number reached 16. Until 1989, the table was divided into East and West groups, depending on geographical location; after that year and until 1992 the table was unified.

In 1992, following the formation of the J.League, the JSL Second Division was renamed the (former) Japan Football League. The league was divided into two hierarchical, unequal divisions of 10 clubs each. In 1994, the JFL was again reunified into a single division. As the J.League expanded in numbers, the need for another second tier with promotion and relegation arose, as the number of clubs which wanted to become professional increased (particularly in the case of Shonan Bellmare, Kashiwa Reysol, Cerezo Osaka and Júbilo Iwata, who had been JSL First Division champions but had not been chosen for the inaugural J.League season).

==== Professionalisation era (1999–2004) ====
The infrastructure of the league was heavily changed in 1999. The new division acquired nine clubs from the semi-professional JFL and one relegated club from J.League to create a two-division system, both being the professional leagues. The top flight became the J.League Division 1 (J1) with 16 clubs while J.League Division 2 (J2) was launched with ten clubs in 1999. The second-tier (former) Japan Football League became the third-tier Japan Football League at that time.

The criteria for becoming a J2 club were not as strict as those for the top division. This allowed smaller cities and towns to maintain a club successfully without investing as much as clubs in J1. In fact, clubs like Mito HollyHock only draw an average of 3,000 fans a game and receive minimal sponsorship, yet still field fairly competitive teams in J2.

Clubs in J2 took time to build their teams for J1 promotion, as they also tried to gradually improve their youth systems, their home stadium, their financial status, and their relationship with their hometown. Clubs such as Oita Trinita, Albirex Niigata, Kawasaki Frontale, and Ventforet Kofu accomplished this successfully. All these clubs originally started as J2 in 1999 and were comparatively small, but they eventually earned J1 promotion, in 2002, 2003, 2004, and 2005 respectively. Even though Kofu and Ōita were later relegated back to Division 2, they are well-established association football clubs, managing to average 10,000 fans per game.

The league also began to follow European game formats, as time went on. In the first three seasons (1999–2001), games were played with extra time for regular league matches if there was no winner at end of the regulation. The extra time was abolished in 2002, and the league adopted the standard 3-1-0 points system.

==== Early expansion era (2004–2009) ====
Two Japan Football League clubs, Mito HollyHock and Yokohama FC joined the J2 League in the 2000 and 2001 seasons. Mito initially tried in the 1999 season, but failed, having better luck the following year. On the other hand, Yokohama FC was formed by the fans of Yokohama Flügels, who went defunct after the merger with Yokohama F. Marinos on 1 January 1999. In essence, these two clubs could and should have joined the league in the inaugural year with the original ten clubs, and it was inevitable that they were eventually accepted by the league.

However, besides these two clubs, it seemed that there was no interest from the lower-level clubs; the second division did not see any further expansion for a few seasons. In 2004, however, two clubs showed interest as Thespa Kusatsu and Tokushima Vortis were accepted to the league. Two years later, in the 2006 season, Ehime FC followed in their footsteps. It turned out that many clubs were aiming for membership at the professional level. However, in the early 2000s, these clubs were still in the regional leagues, and it took them three to four years to even eye professionalism.

Clearly, the concept of second-tier professional association football – the fact that clubs can compete at the professional level with low budgets, was something that attracted many amateur clubs across the Japanese nation. At the beginning of the 2006 season, the league took a survey to determine the number of non-league clubs interested in joining the professional league. The results showed that about 40 to 60 clubs in Japan had plans to professionalize over the next 30 years. From the league's perspective, the J.League 'Hundred Year Vision' from the late 90s has been moving in a positive direction.

In light of this, league management formed a committee and looked at two practical options for further expansion – either expand the second division or form a third division. In other words, the league had a choice between letting the non-league clubs achieve the J2 standard, or forming a third division with non-league clubs, where these clubs can prepare for J2. After conducting several case studies, the committee made a professional assessment that it was in the best interest of the league to expand the J2 to 22 clubs rather than form a third division. Several reasons led the committee to this decision:

- The Japan Football League, then the third tier in the Japanese football league system, was already serving the purpose of preparing the non-league clubs.
- At the time, most non-league clubs interested in professionalism were still in the regional or prefectural leagues, two to four levels below J2.
- Twenty-two clubs is the perfect number for the J2 league, as it allows enough home games for annual revenue, while keeping the competition a fair double-round-robin format.
- Most European leagues have similar association football pyramids, where there are more clubs in 2nd and 3rd-tier leagues than in the top flight.

The committee also reintroduced Associate Membership System in the 2006 season. This allowed the committee to identify interested non-league clubs and provide necessary resources to them. The membership was exclusively given to non-league clubs that had intentions of joining the J.League, while meeting most of the criteria for J2 promotion. Several clubs in the Japan Football League and Regional Leagues have applied for and received membership. Associate members finishing in the top 4 of the JFL were promoted to J2. Following the promotion of Ehime FC, six more clubs joined J2 League through this system.

As the number of clubs increased, the league format changed from a quadruple round-robin to a triple round-robin format. This was adopted during the 2008 season with 15 clubs and the 2009 season with 18 clubs. In 2009, the J2 league also saw an increase in promotion slots to three, to accommodate the eighteen-club league. As a result, the Promotion/relegation Series, which allowed the third-place J2 clubs to fight for J1 slots for the following season, was abolished, after its introduction in the 2004 season.

==== Introduction of double round-robin (2010–2011) ====
When the league reached 19 clubs in the 2010 season, the J2 League adopted the double round-robin format. The league continued to expand to 22 clubs, and until then there was no relegation to the Japan Football League. In the next few seasons, the maximum number of clubs that could be promoted to J2 was decided by taking the difference of twenty-two minus the number of clubs in J2.

==== End of expansion and J2 Playoffs (2012–present) ====
When the league reached 22 clubs, two new regulations were introduced. Only the top two clubs earn automatic promotion, while clubs from 3rd to 6th entered playoffs for the final third promotion slot, as in the English Football League Championship, Serie B, or Segunda División. However, the rules will be heavily slanted to favour those with higher league placement:

- The team third in the standings will face the sixth place team, and the fourth place team will face the fifth, as in the European leagues; however, unlike these leagues, the round will be only one match, at the home side of the higher placed team.
- The winners of the two matches meet at the home side of the higher placed team, or potentially at a neutral venue (likely Tokyo National Stadium). The winner of this match is promoted to J1.
- In all matches, in case of a draw after regulation time, the team that ended the season with the higher placement in the league table will be considered the winner, so there will be no extra time and/or penalty shootout.
- If teams ineligible for promotion finished above sixth, they will not be allowed to participate in the playoffs. Instead, the highest ranked team(s) will receive byes.

Also starting in 2012, at most two clubs can be relegated to the lower tier (for 2012 season only, Japan Football League; from 2013, J3 League), depending on how that league finished.

==== Current plans (2013–present) ====
Starting in 2013, a club licensing system was implemented. Clubs failing to fulfill this licensing requirement can be relegated to the third tier, regardless of their league position. The third-tier league, J3 League, was established in 2014, targeting teams having ambitions to reach the J.League. The structure of J2 is likely to remain stable.

Since 2017, two clubs are promoted from and relegated to J3 and starting in 2018, the J2 playoffs winner plays against the 16th-placed J1 club after discussions were held during the prior season. Until 2022, if the J2 playoff winner prevailed, the club was promoted, with the J1 club being relegated, otherwise the J1 club could retain its position in J1 with the promotion failure of the J2 club.

From the 2023 season onwards, the J2 playoff winner will be directly promoted to the J1, without the need to play a match against a J1 League team in order to be promoted. From 2024, the three bottom-placed teams will be automatically relegated to J3.

Beginning in 2026–27, the J.League will use a fall–spring format. The regular season will begin in August and pause for a winter break between December and February, with the final matches played in May.

=== Timeline ===
Year	Important events	# J2 Clubs	Prom. Slots	Rel. Slots
1999	The J.League adopts two divisions, as nine clubs from the former Japan Football League join Division 2, along with the relegated Consadole Sapporo: Montedio Yamagata, Vegalta Sendai, Omiya Ardija, Kawasaki Frontale, Ventforet Kofu, Sagan Tosu, FC Tokyo, Albirex Niigata, and Oita Trinita; The Japan Football League is also restructured, as it becomes the third-tier Japan Football League (JFL).; Note: To distinguish between the former and the current JFL, the new JFL is pronounced Nihon Football League in Japanese.	10	2	0
2000	Mito HollyHock is promoted from Japan Football League	11	2	0
2001	Yokohama FC is promoted from Japan Football League	12	2	0
2002	Extra time is abolished in Division 2 and traditional 3-1-0 points system is adopted	12	2	0
2003		12	2	0
2004	Inception of the two-legged Promotion/relegation Series as the top flight expands to 18 clubs in the following season	12	2.5	0
2005	J.League Division 1 expands to 18 clubs (No relegated clubs from the 2004 J1 season); Tokushima Vortis and Thespa Kusatsu are promoted from Japan Football League	12	2.5	0
2006	Ehime FC is promoted from Japan Football League; Away goals rule is adopted in Promotion/relegation Series; The league forms J.League expansion committee and reintroduces J.League Associate Membership	13	2.5	0
2007		13	2.5	0
2008	Two clubs are promoted from Japan Football League: Roasso Kumamoto and FC Gifu; Division 2 adopts the triple-round-robin format from quadruple-round-robin	15	2.5	0
2009	Three clubs are promoted from Japan Football League: Tochigi SC, Kataller Toyama and Fagiano Okayama; Promotion/relegation Series is eliminated and the third-place club now receives automatic promotion to J1	18	3	0
2010	One club is promoted from Japan Football League: Giravanz Kitakyushu; Division 2 adopts the double-round-robin format from triple-round-robin	19	3	0
2011	One club is promoted from Japan Football League: Gainare Tottori	20	3	0
2012	Matsumoto Yamaga and Machida Zelvia are promoted from Japan Football League; The playoff system for the third promotion spot is introduced; Conditional relegation to Japan Football League is introduced. Machida Zelvia became the first club to be relegated from Division 2.	22	3	1
2013	One club is promoted from Japan Football League: V-Varen Nagasaki; Gainare Tottori became the first club to be relegated to the new J3 League after losing the promotion/relegation Series to Kamatamare Sanuki, the last team to get promoted from the Japan Football League.	22	3	0.5
2014	Kataller Toyama has been relegated to J3, and Kamatamare Sanuki played and won the first promotion/relegation Series with the J3 runners-up. Zweigen Kanazawa becomes the first team to be promoted from J3.	22	3	1.5
2015	Tochigi SC has been relegated to the J3, and Oita Trinita played and lost their first promotion/relegation Series with the J3 runners-up. Renofa Yamaguchi and runners-up Machida Zelvia are promoted from J3.	22	3	1.5
2016	Giravanz Kitakyushu has been relegated to J3, and Zweigen Kanazawa played and won their first promotion/relegation Series with the J3 runners-up, Tochigi SC. Oita Trinita is promoted from J3.	22	3	1.5
2017	Starting this season, there are two promotions from and two relegations to J3.; Thespakusatsu Gunma is relegated to J3, Tochigi SC is promoted.	22	3	2
2018	The promotion-relegation playoff is reintroduced, to be played as one match only.; Roasso Kumamoto and Kamatamare Sanuki are relegated, FC Ryukyu and Kagoshima United are promoted from J3	22	2.5	2
2019	Kagoshima United and FC Gifu are relegated, Giravanz Kitakyushu and Thespakusatsu Gunma are promoted from J3	22	2.5	2
2020	No relegations from J2. Blaublitz Akita and SC Sagamihara are promoted from J3	22	2	0
2021	SC Sagamihara, Ehime FC, Giravanz Kitakyushu, and Matsumoto Yamaga are relegated, Roasso Kumamoto and Iwate Grulla Morioka are promoted from J3	22	2	4
2022	FC Ryukyu, Iwate Grulla Morioka are relegated, Iwaki FC and Fujieda MYFC are promoted from J3	22	2.5	2
2023	Omiya Ardija, Zweigen Kanazawa are relegated, Ehime FC and Kagoshima United are promoted from J3; J.League abolishes entry playoff, reinstates promotion playoffs; League reduced to 20 clubs from 2024 since 2011	22	3	2
2024	Tochigi SC, Kagoshima United and Thespa Gunma are relegated, Omiya Ardija, FC Imabari and Kataller Toyama are promoted from J3; The three worst-placed teams will be directly relegated to J3.	20	3	3
2025	Roasso Kumamoto, Renofa Yamaguchi and Ehime FC are relegated, Tochigi City FC, Vanraure Hachinohe and Tegevajaro Miyazaki are promoted from J3; This is the last season is spring-autumn format.	20	3	3
2026–27	This is first season use fall-spring format starting from August 2026 until May 2027.	20	3	3

== Stance in the Japanese football pyramid ==
Since the inception of the second division in 1999, promotion and relegation follow a pattern similar to European leagues, where the two bottom clubs of J1 and the top two clubs of J2 are guaranteed to move. From the 2004 to the 2008 season, the third-place J2 club entered a Promotion/relegation Series against the sixteenth-place J1 club, with the winner playing in the top flight in the following year. Starting after the 2009 season, the top three J2 clubs received J1 promotion by default, replacing three relegated bottom J1 clubs. However, promotion or the right to play the now-defunct pro/rele series relied on the J2 clubs meeting the requirements for J1 franchise status set by the league. This was not a hindrance, in fact, as no club has been denied promotion due to not meeting the J1 criteria.

The J3 League is currently the third level in the association football system, supplanting the Japan Football League (JFL) which is now one step lower in the system. Being a professional league, the J.League allows only certain clubs from J3 to be promoted. In 2000, 2001, and 2006 the JFL league champions was promoted to J2; in 2005 two teams were promoted. From 2007, the league requires J.League Associate Membership and at least a fourth-place finish in JFL (J3 from 2013) to be promoted to J2. Currently, there are two relegations from J2 to J3. Since 1999, a total of sixteen clubs from JFL (later J3) have been promoted to J2, two of which were expanded into J1. Currently, J1 has 18 clubs and J2 has 22 clubs. Division two expanded to 22 clubs from 20; regular promotion and relegation is in place.

Since its inception in 1999, the format of J2 has been consistent. Clubs played a quadruple round-robin (two home and away) format during the 1999 to 2007 seasons. To accommodate the ongoing expansion process, a triple round-robin format was implemented during the 2008 and 2009 seasons. Until the 2001 season, the clubs played extra time if they were tied after regulation and the clubs received three points for a regulation win, two points for an extra time win, one point for a draw, and no points for a loss (there were no penalties). However, starting in 2002, the league abolished extra time and set the points system to the standard three-one-nil system.

In 2010, the number of clubs grew to 19, prompting a switch to a double round-robin format. The league expanded to 20 teams in 2011 and then to 22 in 2012, a number that stayed the same until the 2023 season. Starting in 2024, each professional league has 20 teams.

== Crest ==
Former logo

The logo that was used from 2015 to 2018

== 2026–27 season ==
=== League format ===
Twenty clubs play in double round-robin format, a total of 38 games each. A club receives three points for a win, one point for a tie, and no points for a loss. The clubs are ranked by points, and tie breakers are, in the following order:

- Goal difference
- Goals scored
- Head-to-head results
- Disciplinary points

A draw would be conducted, if necessary. However, if two clubs are tied at first place, both clubs will be declared champions. The top two clubs will be directly promoted to J1, and the third promotion spot will be decided in a playoff tournament among clubs placed third to sixth. The club that wins these playoffs will then be promoted to J1 the following season. Note that in order to participate in the playoffs a club must possess a J1 license; if one or more clubs fail to do so, they are not allowed in the playoffs and will not be replaced by other clubs.

The relegation to the lower tier J3 League will depend on the number and final standings of promotion-eligible clubs that possess a J2 license. Up to three clubs can be exchanged between two leagues, with direct promotion/relegation between the three bottom-place J2 teams (18th, 19th and 20th) and top three J3 teams (champion, runner-up and play-off winner). If one or both J3 promotion candidates fail to obtain a J2 license, they will not be allowed to promote and J2 relegation spots will be cut accordingly.

Prize money

- First place: 20,000,000 yen
- Second place: 10,000,000 yen
- Third place: 5,000,000 yen

=== Participating clubs (2026–27) ===
Locations of the 2026–27 J2 League teams
Greater Tokyo Area J2 League teams

Club name	Year joined	Seasons in J2	Based in	First season in D2	Seasons in D2	Current spell in D2	Last spell in top flight
Albirex Niigata	1999	9	Niigata, Niigata	1998	10	2026–	2023–2025
Blaublitz Akita	2014 (J3)	4	All cities/towns in Akita	1985	6	2021–	–
Fujieda MYFC	2014 (J3)	3	Central cities/towns in Shizuoka	2023	3	2023–	–
Hokkaido Consadole Sapporo	1998 (J)	13	All cities/towns in Hokkaidō	1978	31	2025–	2017–2024
FC Imabari	2020 (J3)	1	Imabari, Ehime	2025	1	2025–	–
Iwaki FC	2022 (J3)	3	Iwaki and Futaba District, Fukushima	2023	3	2023–	–
Júbilo Iwata	1994 (J)	4	Iwata, Shizuoka	1979	9	2025–	2024
Kataller Toyama	2009	5	Toyama, Toyama	2009	5	2025–	–
Montedio Yamagata	1999	21	All cities/towns in Yamagata	1994	25	2016–	2015
Oita Trinita	1999	13	Ōita	1996	16	2022–	2019–2021
RB Omiya Ardija	1999	12	Omiya, Saitama	1987–88	13	2025–	2016–2017
Sagan Tosu	1999	14	Tosu, Saga	1994	19	2025–	2012–2024
Shonan Bellmare	1994 (J)	13	Hiratsuka, Kanagawa	1990–91	17	2026–	2018–2025
Tegevajaro Miyazaki	2021 (J3)	0	Miyazaki, Miyazaki	2026	0	2026–	–
Tochigi City FC	2025 (J3)	0	Tochigi, Tochigi	2026	0	2026–	–
Tokushima Vortis	2005	18	All cities/towns in Tokushima	1990–91	27	2022–	2021
Vanraure Hachinohe	2019 (J3)	0	Hachinohe, Aomori	2026	0	2026–	–
Vegalta Sendai	1999	12	Sendai, Miyagi	1995	16	2022–	2010–2021
Ventforet Kofu	1999	18	All cities/towns in Yamanashi	1972	43	2018–	2013–2017
Yokohama FC	2001	19	Yokohama, Kanagawa	2001	19	2026–	2025

- Gray background denotes club was most recently relegated/demoted from J1 League.
- Pink background denotes club was most recently promoted from J3 League.
- "Year joined" is the year the club joined the J.League (Division 2 unless otherwise indicated).
- "First season in D2", "Seasons in D2", and "Last spell in D2" take into account all past incarnations of second-tier football: the second division of the Japan Soccer League and the former Japan Football League.
- "Last spell in top flight" includes seasons in the old Japan Soccer League First Division.

=== Stadiums (2026–27) ===
Primary venues used in the J2 League:

Albirex Niigata	Hokkaido Consadole Sapporo	Oita Trinita	Montedio Yamagata	Sagan Tosu
Denka Big Swan Stadium	Sapporo Dome	Resonac Dome Oita	ND Soft Stadium	Ekimae Real Estate Stadium
Capacity: 41,684	Capacity: 38,794	Capacity: 31,997	Capacity: 20,638	Capacity: 20,219
Vegalta Sendai	Kataller Toyama	Blaublitz Akita	Tokushima Vortis	Ventforet Kofu
Yurtec Stadium Sendai	Toyama Stadium	Soyu Stadium	Pocarisweat Stadium	JIT Recycle Ink Stadium
Capacity: 19,526	Capacity: 18,588	Capacity: 18,560	Capacity: 17,924	Capacity: 15,853
RB Omiya Ardija	Yokohama FC	Shonan Bellmare	Júbilo Iwata	Fujieda MYFC
NACK5 Stadium Omiya	NHK Spring Mitsuzawa Football Stadium	Lemon Gas Stadium Hiratsuka	Yamaha Stadium	Fujieda Soccer Stadium
Capacity: 15,491	Capacity: 15,442	Capacity: 15,380	Capacity: 15,165	Capacity: 10,057
FC Imabari	Iwaki FC	Tochigi City FC	Tegevajaro Miyazaki	Vanraure Hachinohe
ASICS Satoyama Stadium	Hawaiians Stadium Iwaki	City Football Station	Ichigo Miyazaki Shintomi Football Stadium	Prifoods Stadium
Capacity: 5,316	Capacity: 5,066	Capacity: 4,400	Capacity: 2,118	Capacity: 1,204

=== Former clubs ===
Club	Year joined	Seasons in J2	Based in	First season in D2	Seasons in D2	Last spell in D2	Current league
Avispa Fukuoka	1996 (J)	16	Fukuoka	1991/92	20	2017–2020	J1
Cerezo Osaka	1995 (J)	6	Osaka and Sakai, Osaka	1991/92	10	2015–2016	J1
Ehime FC	2006	17	Matsuyama, Ehime	2006	17	2023–2025	J3
Fagiano Okayama	2009	15	Okayama, Okayama	2009	15	2009–2024	J1
Gainare Tottori	2011	3	All cities/towns in Tottori	2011	3	2011–2013	J3
Gamba Osaka	1993 (J)	1	Suita, Osaka	1984	4	2013	J1
FC Gifu	2008	12	All cities/towns in Gifu	2008	12	2008–2019	J3
Giravanz Kitakyushu	2010	9	Kitakyushu, Fukuoka	2010	9	2020–2021	J3
Iwate Grulla Morioka	2014 (J3)	1	Morioka, Iwate	2022	1	2022	JFL
JEF United Chiba	1993 (J)	15	Chiba, Chiba	2009	15	2009–2025	J1
Kamatamare Sanuki	2014	5	All cities/towns in Kagawa	2014	5	2014–2018	J3
Kashiwa Reysol	1995 (J)	3	Kashiwa, Chiba	1987/88	9	2019	J1
Kawasaki Frontale	1999	5	Kawasaki, Kanagawa	1972	25	2001–2004	J1
Kyoto Sanga	1996 (J)	15	Southwestern cities in Kyoto	1972	28	2010–2021	J1
Machida Zelvia	2012	6	Machida, Tokyo	2009	6	2016–2023	J1
Matsumoto Yamaga	2012	9	Central cities/towns in Nagano	2012	9	2020–2021	J3
Mito HollyHock	2000	25	Mito, Ibaraki	1997	27	2000–2025	J1
Nagoya Grampus	1993 (J)	1	All cities/towns in Aichi	1972	13	2017	J1
Renofa Yamaguchi	2015 (J3)	9	Yamaguchi, Yamaguchi	2016	9	2016–2025	J3
Roasso Kumamoto	2008	14	Kumamoto, Kumamoto	2008	14	2022–2025	J3
Ryukyu Okinawa	2014 (J3)	4	All cities/towns in Okinawa	2019	4	2019–2022	J3
SC Sagamihara	2014 (J3)	1	Sagamihara, Kanagawa	2021	1	2021	J3
Sanfrecce Hiroshima	1993 (J)	2	Hiroshima, Hiroshima	1984	7	2008	J1
Shimizu S-Pulse	1993 (J)	3	Shimizu, Shizuoka	2013	3	2023–2024	J1
Thespa Gunma	2005	17	Maebashi, Gunma	2005	17	2020–2024	J3
Tochigi SC	2009	13	Utsunomiya, Tochigi	2009	13	2018–2024	J3
FC Tokyo	1999	2	Tokyo	1991/92	10	2011	J1
Tokyo Verdy	1993 (J)	17	Tokyo	1972	23	2009–2023	J1
Urawa Red Diamonds	1993 (J)	1	Saitama	1989/90	2	2000	J1
V-Varen Nagasaki	2013	11	Nagasaki, Nagasaki	2013	11	2019–2025	J1
Vissel Kobe	1997 (J)	2	Kobe, Hyōgo	1986/87	11	2013	J1
Zweigen Kanazawa	2014 (J3)	8	Kanazawa, Ishikawa	2015	8	2015–2023	J3

- Pink background denotes clubs that were most recently promoted to J1 League.
- Gray background denotes club that was most recently relegated to J3 League.
- "Year joined" is the year the club joined the J.League (Division 2 unless otherwise indicated).
- "First season in D2", "Seasons in D2", and "Last Spell in D2" take into account all past incarnations of second-tier football: the second division of the Japan Soccer League and the former Japan Football League

== Champions and promotion history ==
The top two clubs receive promotion. From the 2004 season to the 2008 season, the third place club played the promotion/relegation series against the 16th-place club in J1. From the 2009 to the 2011 season, the third place club was promoted by default. From 2012 to 2017 and 2023 onwards, the third promotion place is determined by a playoff between the 3rd to 6th actual places. From 2018 to 2019 and 2022, the playoff winners faced off against the 16th place in J1.

Year	Champions	Runners-up	Third place	Playoff winners
1999	Kawasaki Frontale	FC Tokyo	Oita Trinita	N/A
2000	Consadole Sapporo	Urawa Red Diamonds	Oita Trinita	N/A
2001	Kyoto Purple Sanga	Vegalta Sendai	Montedio Yamagata	N/A
2002	Oita Trinita	Cerezo Osaka	Albirex Niigata	N/A
2003	Albirex Niigata	Sanfrecce Hiroshima	Kawasaki Frontale	N/A
2004	Kawasaki Frontale	Omiya Ardija	Avispa Fukuoka †	N/A
2005	Kyoto Purple Sanga	Avispa Fukuoka	**Ventforet Kofu** ‡	N/A
2006	Yokohama FC	Kashiwa Reysol	**Vissel Kobe** ‡	N/A
2007	Consadole Sapporo	Tokyo Verdy 1969	**Kyoto Sanga** ‡	N/A
2008	Sanfrecce Hiroshima	Montedio Yamagata	Vegalta Sendai†	N/A
2009	Vegalta Sendai	Cerezo Osaka	**Shonan Bellmare**	N/A
2010	Kashiwa Reysol	Ventforet Kofu	**Avispa Fukuoka**	N/A
2011	FC Tokyo	Sagan Tosu	**Consadole Sapporo**	N/A
2012	Ventforet Kofu	Shonan Bellmare	Kyoto Sanga	**Oita Trinita** (6th)
2013	Gamba Osaka	Vissel Kobe	Kyoto Sanga	**Tokushima Vortis** (4th)
2014	Shonan Bellmare	Matsumoto Yamaga	JEF United Chiba	**Montedio Yamagata** (6th)
2015	Omiya Ardija	Júbilo Iwata	**Avispa Fukuoka** (3rd)^{‡}	
2016	Consadole Sapporo	Shimizu S-Pulse	Matsumoto Yamaga	**Cerezo Osaka** (4th)^{‡}
2017	Shonan Bellmare	V-Varen Nagasaki	**Nagoya Grampus** (3rd)^{‡}	
2018	Matsumoto Yamaga	Oita Trinita	Yokohama FC †	Júbilo Iwata (J1)
2019	Kashiwa Reysol	Yokohama FC	Omiya Ardija †	Shonan Bellmare (J1)
2020	Tokushima Vortis	Avispa Fukuoka	V-Varen Nagasaki	N/A
2021	Júbilo Iwata	Kyoto Sanga	Ventforet Kofu	N/A
2022	Albirex Niigata	Yokohama FC	Fagiano Okayama †	Kyoto Sanga (J1)
2023	Machida Zelvia	Júbilo Iwata	**Tokyo Verdy** (3rd)^{‡}	
2024	Shimizu S-Pulse	Yokohama FC	V-Varen Nagasaki	**Fagiano Okayama** (5th)
2025	Mito HollyHock	V-Varen Nagasaki	**JEF United Chiba** (3rd)^{‡}	

* Bold designates the promoted club
† Lost the promotion/relegation series or entry playoff
‡ Won the promotion/relegation series or entry playoff and got promoted

=== Most successful clubs ===
Clubs in bold compete in J2 as of the 2025 season.

Club	Winners	Runners-up	Promotions	Winning seasons	Runners-up seasons	Promotion seasons
**Hokkaido Consadole Sapporo**	3	0	4	2000, 2007, 2016		2000, 2007, 2011, 2016
Shonan Bellmare	2	1	4	2014, 2017	2012	2009, 2012, 2014, 2017
Kyoto Sanga	2	0	4	2001, 2005	2021	2001, 2005, 2007, 2021
Kashiwa Reysol	2	1	3	2010, 2019	2006	2006, 2010, 2019
Kawasaki Frontale	2	0	2	1999, 2004		1999, 2004
Albirex Niigata	2	0	2	2003, 2022		2003, 2022
Yokohama FC	1	3	4	2006	2019, 2022, 2024	2006, 2019, 2022, 2024
**Ventforet Kofu**	1	1	3	2012	2010	2005, 2010, 2012
**Júbilo Iwata**	1	1	3	2021	2015, 2023	2015, 2021, 2023
**Oita Trinita**	1	0	3	2002		2002, 2012, 2018
Sanfrecce Hiroshima	1	1	2	2008	2003	2003, 2008
**Vegalta Sendai**	1	1	2	2009	2001	2001, 2009
FC Tokyo	1	1	2	2011	1999	1999, 2011
**Omiya Ardija**	1	1	2	2015	2004	2004, 2015
Shimizu S-Pulse	1	1	2	2024	2016	2016, 2024
**Tokushima Vortis**	1	0	2	2020		2013, 2020
Matsumoto Yamaga	1	1	1	2018	2014	2014
Gamba Osaka	1	0	1	2013		2013
Machida Zelvia	1	0	1	2023		2023
**Mito HollyHock**	1	0	0	2025		
Avispa Fukuoka	0	2	4		2005, 2020	2005, 2010, 2015, 2020
Cerezo Osaka	0	2	3		2002, 2009	2002, 2009, 2016
Vissel Kobe	0	1	2		2013	2006, 2013
**Montedio Yamagata**	0	1	2		2008	2008, 2014
Urawa Red Diamonds	0	1	1		2000	2000
Tokyo Verdy	0	1	2		2007	2007, 2023
**Sagan Tosu**	0	1	1		2011	2011
**V-Varen Nagasaki**	0	2	0		2017, 2025	
Nagoya Grampus	0	0	1			2017
Fagiano Okayama	0	0	1			2024
**JEF United Chiba**	0	0	1			2025

== Relegation history ==
Upon the formation of the second division, the league had not implemented any relegation mechanism between J2 and the (formerly) third tier Japan Football League, and the exchange between divisions worked one-way only. After years of gradual expansion, the division has reached its planned capacity of 22 teams, therefore allowing J.League to start relegating bottom-place teams to JFL. Machida Zelvia set the unhappy milestone in 2012, becoming the first team to be relegated from J2 (and the only team ever to be relegated to JFL). Next year the professional J3 League was formed, making relegation between second and third tiers a permanent establishment.

The rules for exchange between J2 and J3 are the following from 2017 to 2019 and 2022 to 2023: the 21st and 22nd place J2 teams are relegated immediately and are replaced by the J3 champion and runner-up. If one or both J3 contenders do not possess J2 licenses, they are not allowed to be promoted, and the relegation spots for J2 sides are reduced accordingly.

No teams descended from J1 or to J3 after the 2020 season due to the COVID-19 pandemic in Japan and its effects. Instead, two promotions and four relegations were in place for the 2021 season, keeping the number of J2 teams at 22. Three relegations to J3 will be from 2024 onwards.

Year	19th place	20th place	21st place	22nd place
2012	N/A		FC Gifu	Machida Zelvia
2013	N/A		FC Gifu	Gainare Tottori^{‡}
2014	N/A		Kamatamare Sanuki^{†}	Kataller Toyama
2015	N/A		Oita Trinita^{‡}	Tochigi SC
2016	N/A		Zweigen Kanazawa^{†}	Giravanz Kitakyushu
2017	N/A		Roasso Kumamoto	Thespakusatsu Gunma
2018	N/A		Roasso Kumamoto	Kamatamare Sanuki
2019	N/A		Kagoshima United	FC Gifu
2021	SC Sagamihara	Ehime FC	Giravanz Kitakyushu	Matsumoto Yamaga
2022	N/A		FC Ryukyu	Iwate Grulla Morioka
2023	N/A		Omiya Ardija	Zweigen Kanazawa

Year	18th place	19th place	20th place
2024	Tochigi SC	Kagoshima United	Thespa Gunma
2025	Roasso Kumamoto	Renofa Yamaguchi	Ehime FC
2026–27			

* Bold designates relegated clubs
^{†} Won the playoff against JFL or J3 team
^{‡} Lost the playoff series to JFL or J3 team and was relegated

== Players and managers ==
=== Managers ===
- List of J.League managers

=== Top scorers ===
Year	Player	Nationality	Squad	Goals
1999	Takuya Jinno	Japan	Oita Trinita	19
2000	Emerson Sheik	Brazil	Consadole Sapporo	31
2001	Marcos	Brazil	Vegalta Sendai	34
2002	Marx	Brazil	Albirex Niigata	19
2003	Marx	Brazil	Albirex Niigata	32
2004	Juninho	Brazil	Kawasaki Frontale	37
2005	Paulinho	Brazil	Kyoto Purple Sanga	22
2006	Humberlito Borges	Brazil	Vegalta Sendai	26
2007	Hulk	Brazil	Tokyo Verdy	37
2008	Hisato Sato	Japan	Sanfrecce Hiroshima	28
2009	Shinji Kagawa	Japan	Cerezo Osaka	27
2010	Mike Havenaar	Japan	Ventforet Kofu	20
2011	Yohei Toyoda	Japan	Sagan Tosu	23
2012	Davi	Brazil	Ventforet Kofu	32
2013	Kempes	Brazil	JEF United Chiba	22
2014	Masashi Oguro	Japan	Kyoto Sanga	26
2015	Jay Bothroyd	England	Júbilo Iwata	20
2016	Jong Tae-se	North Korea	Shimizu S-Pulse	26
2017	Ibba Laajab	Norway	Yokohama FC	25
2018	Genki Omae	Japan	Omiya Ardija	24
2019	Leonardo	Brazil	Albirex Niigata	28
2020	Peter Utaka	Nigeria	Kyoto Sanga	22
2021	Lukian	Brazil	Júbilo Iwata	22
2022	Koki Ogawa	Japan	Yokohama FC	26
2023	Juanma	Spain	V-Varen Nagasaki	26
2024	Hiiro Komori	Japan	JEF United Chiba	23
2025	Matheus Jesus	Brazil	V-Varen Nagasaki	19

== See also ==
- Sport in Japan
  - Football in Japan
    - Women's football in Japan
- Japan Football Association (JFA)

Soccer/Football
League system

- Japanese association football league system
- J.League
  - J1 League (Tier 1)
  - J2 League (Tier 2)
  - J3 League (Tier 3)
- Japan Football League (JFL) (Tier 4)
- Regional Champions League (Promotion playoffs to JFL)
- Regional Leagues (Tier 5/6)

Domestic cup

- Fujifilm Super Cup (Super Cup)
- Emperor's Cup (National Cup)
- J.League YBC Levain Cup (League Cup)

Futsal

- F.League
  - F1 League (Tier 1)
  - F2 League (Tier 2)
- JFA Futsal Championship (National Cup)
- F.League Ocean Cup (League Cup)

Beach soccer

- Beach Soccer Championship (National Cup)
