= 2009 Shonan Bellmare season =

Shonan Bellmare
2009 season
- Manager: Yasuharu Sorimachi
- Stadium: Hiratsuka Athletics Stadium
- J. League 2: 3rd
- Emperor's Cup: 2nd Round
- Top goalscorer: Yuya Nakamura (14)

2009 Shonan Bellmare season

== Competitions ==
Competitions	Position
J. League 2	3rd / 18 clubs
Emperor's Cup	2nd Round

== Player statistics ==
No.	Pos.	Player	D.o.B. (Age)	Height / Weight	J. League 2		Emperor's Cup		Total	
No.	Pos.	Player	D.o.B. (Age)	Height / Weight	Apps	Goals	Apps	Goals	Apps	Goals
1	GK	Tomohiko Ito	May 28, 1978 (aged 30)	cm / kg	0	0				
2	DF	Yuzo Tamura	December 7, 1982 (aged 26)	cm / kg	45	0				
3	DF	Jean	September 24, 1977 (aged 31)	cm / kg	49	6				
4	DF	Takahiro Yamaguchi	May 8, 1984 (aged 24)	cm / kg	30	0				
5	DF	Kohei Usui	July 16, 1979 (aged 29)	cm / kg	50	4				
6	DF	Nobutaka Suzuki	September 12, 1983 (aged 25)	cm / kg	12	0				
7	MF	Yoshito Terakawa	September 6, 1974 (aged 34)	cm / kg	51	7				
8	MF	Koji Sakamoto	December 3, 1978 (aged 30)	cm / kg	50	13				
9	FW	Tuto	July 2, 1978 (aged 30)	cm / kg	15	3				
9	FW	Adriano	May 2, 1987 (aged 21)	cm / kg	0	0				
9	FW	Lincoln	June 14, 1983 (aged 25)	cm / kg	9	1				
10	MF	Adiel	August 13, 1980 (aged 28)	cm / kg	42	11				
11	FW	Yoshiro Abe	July 5, 1980 (aged 28)	cm / kg	48	10				
13	MF	Shota Suzuki	July 3, 1984 (aged 24)	cm / kg	2	0				
14	DF	Akihiro Sakata	May 16, 1984 (aged 24)	cm / kg	6	0				
15	FW	Jung Jung-Hyun	June 9, 1987 (aged 21)	cm / kg	0	0				
15	FW	Nenen	March 25, 1990 (aged 18)	cm / kg	0	0				
16	GK	Kei Uemura	September 24, 1981 (aged 27)	cm / kg	0	0				
17	MF	Daisuke Kikuchi	April 12, 1991 (aged 17)	cm / kg	6	1				
18	DF	Shoma Kamata	June 15, 1989 (aged 19)	cm / kg	7	0				
19	DF	Taisuke Muramatsu	December 16, 1989 (aged 19)	cm / kg	50	0				
20	FW	Ryuta Hara	April 19, 1981 (aged 27)	cm / kg	11	1				
21	MF	Ryota Nagata	May 17, 1985 (aged 23)	cm / kg	42	1				
22	FW	Yuya Nakamura	April 14, 1986 (aged 22)	cm / kg	44	14				
23	FW	Tatsuki Kobayashi	May 5, 1985 (aged 23)	cm / kg	0	0				
24	FW	Tetsuya Kanno	August 30, 1989 (aged 19)	cm / kg	0	0				
25	GK	Kim Yong-Gwi	January 24, 1985 (aged 24)	cm / kg	0	0				
26	FW	Kohei Yamamoto	April 15, 1986 (aged 22)	cm / kg	0	0				
27	DF	Keisuke Takigawa	April 18, 1986 (aged 22)	cm / kg	0	0				
28	MF	Yuki Igari	April 7, 1988 (aged 20)	cm / kg	16	1				
29	DF	Kento Fukuda	May 15, 1990 (aged 18)	cm / kg	0	0				
30	DF	Tsuyoshi Shimamura	August 10, 1985 (aged 23)	cm / kg	21	0				
31	MF	Yohei Maeda	May 19, 1990 (aged 18)	cm / kg	0	0				
32	GK	Yosuke Nozawa	November 9, 1979 (aged 29)	cm / kg	51	0				
33	MF	Kai Harada	February 2, 1990 (aged 19)	cm / kg	0	0				
34	FW	Yutaka Tahara	April 27, 1982 (aged 26)	cm / kg	41	10				
35	DF	Shota Kobayashi	May 11, 1991 (aged 17)	cm / kg	0	0				
40	MF	Shuto Suzuki	August 31, 1985 (aged 23)	cm / kg	6	0				

== Other pages ==
- (in Japanese) J. League official site
