= 2010 Shonan Bellmare season =

Shonan Bellmare
2010 season
- Manager: Yasuharu Sorimachi
- Stadium: Hiratsuka Athletics Stadium
- J. League 1: 18th
- Emperor's Cup: 3rd Round
- J. League Cup: GL-B 7th
- Top goalscorer: Yoshiro Abe (9)

The 2010 Shonan Bellmare season was their first season back in the top flight, J. League Division 1 after 10 seasons, and 25th season overall in the Japanese top flight. It was also the first season in which they participated as an autonomous club and not as a works team of Fujita Engineering, their original parent company until 1999, whose lack of support caused them to be relegated that year.

== Competitions ==
Competitions	Position
J. League 1	18th / 18 clubs
Emperor's Cup	3rd Round
J. League Cup	GL-B 7th / 7 clubs

=== J. League 1 ===
Pos	Team	Pld	W	D	L	GF	GA	GD	Pts	Qualification or relegation
14	Vegalta Sendai	34	10	9	15	40	46	−6	39	
15	Vissel Kobe	34	9	11	14	37	45	−8	38	
16	FC Tokyo (R)	34	8	12	14	36	41	−5	36	Relegation to 2011 J.League Division 2
17	Kyoto Sanga (R)	34	4	7	23	30	60	−30	19	Relegation to 2011 J.League Division 2
18	Shonan Bellmare (R)	34	3	7	24	31	82	−51	16	Relegation to 2011 J.League Division 2

Updated to match(es) played on December 4, 2010. Source: J.League Division 1
Rules for classification: 1) points; 2) goal difference; 3) number of goals scored.
(R) Relegated

== Player statistics ==
No.	Pos.	Player	D.o.B. (Age)	Height / Weight	J. League 1		Emperor's Cup		J. League Cup		Total	
No.	Pos.	Player	D.o.B. (Age)	Height / Weight	Apps	Goals	Apps	Goals	Apps	Goals	Apps	Goals
1	GK	Yosuke Nozawa	November 9, 1979 (aged 30)	cm / kg	18	0						
2	DF	Yuzo Tamura	December 7, 1982 (aged 27)	cm / kg	22	0						
3	DF	Jean	September 24, 1977 (aged 32)	cm / kg	15	1						
4	DF	Takahiro Yamaguchi	May 8, 1984 (aged 25)	cm / kg	20	1						
5	DF	Kohei Usui	July 16, 1979 (aged 30)	cm / kg	26	0						
6	DF	Taisuke Muramatsu	December 16, 1989 (aged 20)	cm / kg	30	0						
7	MF	Yoshito Terakawa	September 6, 1974 (aged 35)	cm / kg	29	1						
8	MF	Koji Sakamoto	December 3, 1978 (aged 31)	cm / kg	30	3						
9	FW	Yutaka Tahara	April 27, 1982 (aged 27)	cm / kg	27	4						
10	MF	Adiel	August 13, 1980 (aged 29)	cm / kg	0	0						
11	FW	Yoshiro Abe	July 5, 1980 (aged 29)	cm / kg	34	9						
13	DF	Nobutaka Suzuki	September 12, 1983 (aged 26)	cm / kg	5	0						
14	DF	Akihiro Sakata	May 16, 1984 (aged 25)	cm / kg	9	0						
15	MF	Han Kook-Young	April 19, 1990 (aged 19)	cm / kg	19	0						
16	GK	Kei Uemura	September 24, 1981 (aged 28)	cm / kg	0	0						
17	MF	Kenji Baba	July 7, 1985 (aged 24)	cm / kg	16	1						
18	FW	Tatsunori Arai	December 22, 1983 (aged 26)	cm / kg	17	0						
19	MF	Satoru Hayashi	June 13, 1988 (aged 21)	cm / kg	0	0						
20	MF	Yuki Igari	April 7, 1988 (aged 21)	cm / kg	2	0						
21	MF	Ryota Nagata	May 17, 1985 (aged 24)	cm / kg	8	0						
22	FW	Yuya Nakamura	April 14, 1986 (aged 23)	cm / kg	30	3						
23	FW	Tatsuki Kobayashi	May 5, 1985 (aged 24)	cm / kg	1	0						
24	DF	Yuki Ozawa	October 4, 1983 (aged 26)	cm / kg	11	0						
25	GK	Kim Yong-Gwi	January 24, 1985 (aged 25)	cm / kg	0	0						
26	DF	Shota Kobayashi	May 11, 1991 (aged 18)	cm / kg	7	0						
27	FW	Genki Nakayama	September 15, 1981 (aged 28)	cm / kg	3	1						
28	DF	Naoto Matsuo	September 10, 1979 (aged 30)	cm / kg	0	0						
29	MF	Isamu Matsuura	August 12, 1991 (aged 18)	cm / kg	0	0						
30	DF	Tsuyoshi Shimamura	August 10, 1985 (aged 24)	cm / kg	24	1						
31	FW	Choi Seunig-In	March 5, 1991 (aged 19)	cm / kg	1	0						
32	GK	Takuya Matsumoto	February 6, 1989 (aged 21)	cm / kg	1	0						
33	DF	Wataru Endo	February 9, 1993 (aged 17)	cm / kg	6	1						
35	GK	Tomohiko Ito	May 28, 1978 (aged 31)	cm / kg	0	0						
36	FW	Kazushi Mitsuhira	January 13, 1988 (aged 22)	cm / kg	9	1						
37	DF	Eijiro Takeda	July 11, 1988 (aged 21)	cm / kg	0	0						
38	FW	Valdo	November 22, 1980 (aged 29)	cm / kg	8	0						
39	GK	Ryōta Tsuzuki	April 18, 1978 (aged 31)	cm / kg	15	0						
40	MF	Emerson	April 23, 1980 (aged 29)	cm / kg	20	4						
41	MF	Ryota Nagaki	June 4, 1988 (aged 21)	cm / kg	11	0						

== Other pages ==
- (in Japanese) J. League official site
