= 2012 Shonan Bellmare season =

Shonan Bellmare
2012 season
- Manager: Yasuharu Sorimachi
- J.League Division 2: -
- Emperor's Cup: -
Home colours	Away colours

The 2012 Shonan Bellmare season sees Shonan Bellmare compete in J.League Division 2 for the second consecutive season after being relegated from J1 in 2010, and 16th season overall in the second tier. Shonan Bellmare are also competing in the 2012 Emperor's Cup.

== Competitions ==
=== J.League ===
==== League table ====
Pos	Team	Pld	W	D	L	GF	GA	GD	Pts	Promotion or relegation
1	Ventforet Kofu (C, P)	42	24	14	4	63	35	+28	86	Promotion to 2013 J.League Division 1
2	Shonan Bellmare (P)	42	20	15	7	66	43	+23	75	Promotion to 2013 J.League Division 1
3	Kyoto Sanga	42	23	5	14	61	45	+16	74	Qualification for promotion playoffs
4	Yokohama FC	42	22	7	13	62	45	+17	73	Qualification for promotion playoffs
5	JEF United Chiba	42	21	9	12	61	33	+28	72	Qualification for promotion playoffs

Updated to match(es) played on 11 November 2012. Source: J.League Division 2
Rules for classification: 1st points; 2nd goal differential; 3rd goals scored; 4th head-to-head results; 5th disciplinary points; 6th draw. If two clubs are tied for first place, both clubs will be declared champions.
(C) Champions; (P) Promoted

==== Matches ====
4 March 2012 1	Shonan Bellmare	2 – 1	Kyoto Sanga	Shonan BMW Stadium Hiratsuka
Sunday 17:34	Iwakami 37'; Kikuchi 90+1'	Report	31' Nakayama	Attendance: 9,065; Referee: Okabe

11 March 2012 2	Thespa Kusatsu	1 – 3	Shonan Bellmare	Shoda Shoyu Stadium Gumma
Sunday 15:04	Sugimoto 48'	Report	29' Endo; 39' Kobayashi; 86' Iwakami	Attendance: 4,237; Referee: Enomoto

17 March 2012 3	Shonan Bellmare	3 – 1	Avispa Fukuoka	Shonan BMW Stadium Hiratsuka
Saturday 16:04	Endo 44'; Iwakami 63'; Baba 90+2'	Report	84' Sakata	Attendance: 3,602; Referee: Nakamura

20 March 2012 4	Shonan Bellmare	2 – 1	FC Gifu	Shonan BMW Stadium Hiratsuka
Tuesday 16:04	Baba 13'; Ono 75'	Report	90+3' Higuchi	Attendance: 6,065; Referee: Onishi

25 March 2012 5	Roasso Kumamoto	3 – 3	Shonan Bellmare	Kumamoto Athletics Stadium
Sunday 16:04	Hiroi 12'; Osako 34'; Taketomi 87'	Report	23' Baba; 55' Furuhashi; 79' Otsuki	Attendance: 4,687; Referee: Fukushima

1 April 2012 6	Gainare Tottori	1 – 2	Shonan Bellmare	Tottori Bank Bird Stadium
Sunday 14:00	Mori (yellow card) 19'; Mizumoto (yellow card) 68'; Fukui 90+1'	Report	Shimamura 49'; Miyazaki 89'; Furuhashi (yellow card) 90'	Attendance: 2,086; Referee: (Japan) Shoichiro Mikami

8 April 2012 7	Shonan Bellmare	2 – 0	Machida Zelvia	Shonan BMW Stadium Hiratsuka
Sunday 17:00	Endo 67' 90+2' (pen.); Kaoru Takayama (yellow card) 77'; Nagaki (yellow card) 78'	Report	Ota (yellow card) 19'; Tsuda (yellow card) 22' (yellow-red card) 90+1'; Fujita (yellow card) 42'; Suzuki (yellow card) 57'	Attendance: 7,035; Referee: (Japan) Kazuyuki Hayakawa

15 April 2012 8	Shonan Bellmare	3 – 2	Yokohama	Shonan BMW Stadium Hiratsuka
Sunday 17:00	Han Kook-Young (yellow card) 14'; Baba 36'; Nagaki (yellow card) 48'; Kaoru Takayama 52'; Kikuchi 68'	Report	Sugiyama (yellow card) 35'; Uchida (yellow card) 43' (goal) 46'; Takeoka 85'	Attendance: 7,111; Referee: (Japan) Yuichi Nishimura

22 April 2012 9	Tokyo Verdy	1 – 2	Shonan Bellmare	Ajinomoto Stadium
Sunday 15:30	Tsuchiya (yellow card) 17'; Wada (yellow card) 24'; Takahashi (yellow card) 38'; Fukatsu (yellow card) 59'; Mori (yellow card) 71'; Abe 87'	Report	Furuhashi (yellow card) 26'; Nagaki (yellow card) 41'; Endo 70' (pen.) (yellow card) 90+2'; Shimamura 71'	Attendance: 6,544; Referee: (Japan) Hiroyuki Kimura

27 April 2012 10	Shonan Bellmare	1 – 2	Mito HollyHock	Shonan BMW Stadium Hiratsuka
Friday 20:00	Kobayashi (yellow card) 22'; Baba 38' (yellow card) 64'; Furuhashi (yellow card) 54'; Ono (yellow card) 80'	Report	Romero Berrocal Frank Lark 6'; Omoto (yellow card) 47'; Nishioka (yellow card) 62'; Shimada 87'	Attendance: 4,850; Referee: (Japan) Hiromichi Oka

30 April 2012 11	Ehime FC	2 – 1	Shonan Bellmare	Ningineer Stadium
Monday 15:00	Arita 27'; Takumi Murakami (yellow card) 33' (yellow-red card) 68'; Maeno 38'; Sonoda (yellow card) 62'	Report	Ono 83'	Attendance: 3,520; Referee: (Japan) Nobutsugu Murakami

3 May 2012 12	Shonan Bellmare	1 – 1	Ventforet Kofu	Shonan BMW Stadium Hiratsuka
Thursday 19:30	Ono (yellow card) 36' (yellow-red card) 67'; Baba 39'; Kobayashi (yellow card) 75'	Report	Ito (yellow card) 27'; Douglas Santos (yellow card) 36'; Kashiwa (yellow card) 36'; Takasaki 52'	Attendance: 8,114; Referee: (Japan) Tomoya Maeda

6 May 2012 13	Matsumoto Yamaga	1 – 1	Shonan Bellmare	Matsumotodaira Football Stadium
Sunday 17:00	Iida (yellow card) 17'; Funayama (yellow card) 59' (goal) 86'	Report	Han Kook-Young (yellow card) 29'; Baba 88'	Attendance: 8,323; Referee: (Japan) Ryoichi Imamura

13 May 2012 14	Shonan Bellmare	1 – 1	Oita Trinita	Shonan BMW Stadium Hiratsuka
Sunday 17:00	Endo 64' (yellow card) 87'; Ono (yellow card) 77'	Report	Nishi 26'; Tameda (yellow card) 61'; Yu Yasukawa (yellow card) 81'	Attendance: 6,111; Referee: (Japan) Koichiro Fukushima

20 May 2012 15	Tochigi SC	1 – 1	Shonan Bellmare	Tochigi Green Stadium
Sunday 17:00	Kikuoka 68' (yellow card) 90'; Paulinho (yellow card) 70'; Kan (yellow card) 90+2'	Report	Nagaki (yellow card) 53'; Furuhashi 79'	Attendance: 3,933; Referee: (Japan) Tomohiro Tsukada

27 May 2012 16	Shonan Bellmare	0 – 0	Tokushima Vortis	Shonan BMW Stadium Hiratsuka
Sunday 17:00	Ono (yellow card) 55' (yellow-red card) 59'; Abe (yellow card) 65'	Report		Attendance: 5,862; Referee: (Japan) Hiroyuki Kimura

2 June 2012 17	Giravanz Kitakyushu	3 – 2	Shonan Bellmare	Honjō Athletic Stadium
Saturday 17:00	Miyamoto (yellow card) 8'; Yasuda (yellow card) 42' (goal) 81'; Tokiwa 46'; Abe 60' (o.g.)	Report	Kikuchi 53'; Han Kook-Young (yellow card) 63'; Yamaguchi (yellow card) 73'; Kamata (yellow card) 79'; Ryohei Yoshihama 87'; Furuhashi (yellow card) 90+4'	Attendance: 2,677; Referee: (Japan) Tetsuro Yoshida

9 June 2012 18	Shonan Bellmare	1 – 0	Kataller Toyama	Shonan BMW Stadium Hiratsuka
Sunday 17:00	Sakamoto (yellow card) 11'; Kobayashi (yellow card) 69'; Nakamura 90+1'	Report		Attendance: 5,148; Referee: (Japan) Hiroyoshi Takayama

13 June 2012 19	Montedio Yamagata	1 – 2	Shonan Bellmare	ND Soft Stadium Yamagata
Wednesday 20:00	Bandai (yellow card) 55'; Nishikawa (yellow card) 56'; Miyasaka (yellow card) 58' (goal) 77'; Akiba (yellow card) 60'; Funayama (yellow card) 73'	Report	Nagaki 42'; Kaoru Takayama (yellow card) 66' (goal) 80'; Kobayashi (yellow card) 79'	Attendance: 5,737; Referee: (Japan) Takuto Okabe

17 June 2012 20	Shonan Bellmare	2 – 0	Fagiano Okayama	Shonan BMW Stadium Hiratsuka
Sunday 19:30	Kaoru Takayama 17'; Nakamura 52'	Report		Attendance: 5,265; Referee: (Japan) Yuki Noda

24 June 2012 21	JEF United Ichihara Chiba	1 – 1	Shonan Bellmare	Fukuda Denshi Arena
Sunday 20:00	Fujita 24'; Ito (yellow card) 28'	Report	Kaoru Takayama 43'	Attendance: 9,549; Referee: (Japan) Hiroyuki Onishi

1 July 2012 22	Shonan Bellmare	1 – 1	Matsumoto Yamaga	Shonan BMW Stadium Hiratsuka
Sunday 20:00	Shimomura 36'; Kaoru Takayama (yellow card) 81'	Report	Iio (yellow card) 31'; Ōhashi (yellow card) 79'; Funayama 90+3'	Attendance: 6,693; Referee: (Japan) Shoichiro Mikami

8 July 2012 23	Mito HollyHock	1 – 1	Shonan Bellmare	K's denki Stadium Mito
Sunday 19:00	Suzuki (yellow card) 29'; Ozawa 62'	Report	Shimamura (yellow card) 45+1'; Kobayashi (yellow card) 72'; Ono (yellow card) 84'; Kikuchi 90+4'	Attendance: 4,263; Referee: (Japan) Eiji Kawai

15 July 2012 24	Oita Trinita	1 – 4	Shonan Bellmare	Ōita Bank Dome
Sunday 19:00	Shimizu (yellow card) 11'; Morishima 29'; Yu Yasukawa (yellow card) 90+4'	Report	Baba 4', 79'; Endo 12'; Ono (yellow card) 26'; Kobayashi 39'	Attendance: 10,137; Referee: (Japan) Minoru Tojo

22 July 2012 25	Shonan Bellmare	0 – 0	Montedio Yamagata	Shonan BMW Stadium Hiratsuka
Sunday 19:30	Kikuchi (yellow card) 26'; Kobayashi (yellow card) 62'	Report	Maeda (yellow card) 87'	Attendance: 8,271; Referee: (Japan) Hiroyuki Kimura

29 July 2012 26	Shonan Bellmare	1 – 0	Giravanz Kitakyushu	Shonan BMW Stadium Hiratsuka
Sunday 19:30	Furuhashi 47'; Kaoru Takayama (yellow card) 53'; Abe (yellow card) 67'; Macena (yellow card) 90+3'	Report	Arai (yellow card) 87'	Attendance: 6,334; Referee: (Japan) Tomohiro Tsukada

5 August 2012 27	Yokohama	1 – 0	Shonan Bellmare	Nippatsu Mitsuzawa Stadium
Sunday 19:00	Horinouchi (yellow card) 53'; Hakkaku (yellow card) 55'; Tahara 71'; Schneider (yellow card) 90+2'	Report	Mihara (yellow card) 39'; Nagaki (yellow card) 41'; Yamaguchi (yellow card) 45'	Attendance: 7,616; Referee: (England) Kevin Friend

12 August 2012 28	Avispa Fukuoka	1 – 3	Shonan Bellmare	Level-5 Stadium
Sunday 19:00	Jogo 32'	Report	Kaoru Takayama 3'; Kikuchi 15'; Kobayashi 66'	Attendance: 7,009; Referee: (Japan) Masaaki Iemoto

19 August 2012 29	Shonan Bellmare	1 – 1	Tokyo Verdy	Shonan BMW Stadium Hiratsuka
Sunday 19:30	Kobayashi (yellow card) 39'; Macena 56'	Summary	Iio (yellow card) 50'; Jymmy 76'	Attendance: 9,370; Referee: (Japan) Nobutsugu Murakami

22 August 2012 30	Tokushima Vortis	0 – 0	Shonan Bellmare	Pocarisweat Stadium
Wednesday 20:00	Hamada (yellow card) 13'; Fukumoto (yellow card) 90+1'	Summary	Kamata (yellow card) 80'	Attendance: 3,158; Referee: (Japan) Yuki Noda

26 August 2012 31	Shonan Bellmare	2 – 1	Tochigi SC	Shonan BMW Stadium Hiratsuka
Sunday 19:30	Furuhashi 27'; Shimamura 34'; Shimomura (yellow card) 46'; Ono (yellow card) 68'	Summary	Hirose 19'	Attendance: 7,129; Referee: (Japan) Takuto Okabe

2 September 2012 32	Kyoto Sanga	1 – 2	Shonan Bellmare	Nishikyogoku Athletic Stadium
Sunday 20:00	Kudo 47' (yellow card) 59'; Someya (yellow card) 50'; Jung Woo-Young (yellow card) 80'; Sakai (yellow card) 90+2'	Summary	Macena 33'; Syuhei Otsuki 56'; Shimomura (yellow card) 68'	Attendance: 6,248; Referee: (Japan) Hiroyoshi Takayama

14 September 2012 33	Shonan Bellmare	2 – 0	Thespa Kusatsu	Shonan BMW Stadium Hiratsuka
Friday 20:00	Macena 16', 71'; Nagaki (yellow card) 70'	Summary	Satoru Hoshino (yellow card) 52'; Sakurada (yellow card) 67'; Endo (yellow card) 90+1'	Attendance: 6,346; Referee: (Japan) Koichiro Fukushima

17 September 2012 34	Fagiano Okayama	3 – 1	Shonan Bellmare	Kanko Stadium
Monday 15:00	Goto (yellow card) 16'; Sengoku 34'; Tadokoro 41'; Kawamata 45+3'	Summary	Kobayashi (yellow card) 31'; Furuhashi 62'; Endo (yellow card) 90'	Attendance: 7,155; Referee: (Japan) Minoru Tojo

23 September 2012 35	FC Gifu	3 – 2	Shonan Bellmare	Gifu Nagaragawa Stadium
Sunday 20:00	Koichi Sato 18' (pen.), 54', 59'; Ri Han-Jae (yellow card) 41'; Someya (yellow card) 43'; Abuda (yellow card) 63'	Summary	Endo (red card) 16'; Syuhei Otsuki (yellow card) 23'; Kikuchi 53', 69'; Ono (yellow card) 82'; Shimamura (yellow card) 84'	Attendance: 3,016; Referee: (Japan) Kazuyuki Hayakawa

1 October 2012 36	Shonan Bellmare	1 – 2	Roasso Kumamoto	Shonan BMW Stadium Hiratsuka
Monday 20:00	Yuzo Iwakami 75' (pen.)	Summary	Harada (yellow card) 14'; Saito 43' (yellow card) 67'; Fujimoto (yellow card) 78'; Kitajima 90+4'	Attendance: 3,986; Referee: (Japan) Ryuji Sato

7 October 2012 37	Shonan Bellmare	0 – 0	Ehime FC	Shonan BMW Stadium Hiratsuka
Sunday 17:00	Kikuchi (yellow card) 57'; Han Kook-Young (yellow card) 58'	Summary	Ishii (yellow card) 71'	Attendance: 5,938; Referee: (Japan) Yuki Noda

14 October 2012 38	Ventforet Kofu	2 – 2	Shonan Bellmare	Yamanashi Chuo Bank Stadium
Sunday 16:00	Fernandinho (yellow card) 37'; Izawa 50'; Davi 62' (pen.); Matsuhashi (yellow card) 85'	Summary	Syuhei Otsuki 28'; Macena (yellow card) 30' (goal) 51'; Shimamura (yellow card) 90+3'	Attendance: 16,643; Referee: (Japan) Nobutsugu Murakami

21 October 2012 39	Shonan Bellmare	1 – 1	JEF United Ichihara Chiba	Shonan BMW Stadium Hiratsuka
Sunday 17:00	Nagaki 28'	Summary	Hyodo (yellow card) 71'; Satō 85'	Attendance: 10,918; Referee: (Japan) Yuichi Nishimura

28 October 2012 40	Kataller Toyama	0 – 2	Shonan Bellmare	Toyama Athletic Stadium
Sunday 16:00	Mori (yellow card) 30'; Kokeguchi (yellow card) 38'; Kuniyoshi (yellow card) 45+2'	Summary	Syuhei Otsuki 60'; Iwakami 89'	Attendance: 3,205; Referee: (Japan) Koichiro Fukushima

4 November 2012 41	Shonan Bellmare	1 – 0	Gainare Tottori	Shonan BMW Stadium Hiratsuka
Sunday 16:00	Kikuchi (yellow card) 6'; Takayama (yellow card) 41'; Han Kook-Young (yellow card) 45+1'; Syuhei Otsuki (yellow card) 52'; Thiago Quirino 88'	Summary	Fukui (yellow card) 40'; Nagira (yellow card) 90+1'	Attendance: 10,674; Referee: (Japan) Hajime Matsuo

11 November 2012 42	Machida Zelvia	0 – 3	Shonan Bellmare	Machida Athletic Stadium
Sunday 13:00	Ota (yellow card) 89'	Summary	Thiago Quirino 2' (yellow card) 29'; Takayama 44'; Syuhei Otsuki 67'; Nagaki (yellow card) 87'	Attendance: 7,139; Referee: (Japan) Jumpei Iida

=== Emperor's Cup ===
8 September 2012 Round 2	Shonan Bellmare	1 – 0	Ehime FC	Hiratsuka, Kanagawa
13:00	Syuhei Otsuki 48'	Report		Stadium: Shonan BMW Stadium Hiratsuka; Attendance: 1,478; Referee: Masuya Ueda

10 October 2012 Round 3	Kashiwa Reysol	2 – 1	Shonan Bellmare	Kashiwa
19:00	Tanaka 30'; Neto Baiano 90+2'	Report	Syuhei Otsuki 15'	Stadium: Hitachi Kashiwa Soccer Stadium; Attendance: 3,449; Referee: Inoue
