= 2012 Júbilo Iwata season =

Júbilo Iwata
2012 season
- Chairman: Yoshio Mabuchi
- Manager: Masaaki Yanagishita
- J. League Division 1: 12th
- Emperor's Cup: Fourth round
- J. League Cup: Group stage
| Home colours | Away colours |

The 2012 Júbilo Iwata season was Júbilo Iwata's 19th consecutive season in J. League Division 1 and 30th overall in the Japanese top flight. Júbilo Iwata are also competing in the 2012 Emperor's Cup and 2012 J. League Cup.

== Competitions ==
=== J. League ===
==== League table ====
| Pos | Team | Pld | W | D | L | GF | GA | GD | Pts |
|---|---|---|---|---|---|---|---|---|---|
| 10 | FC Tokyo | 34 | 14 | 6 | 14 | 47 | 44 | +3 | 48 |
| 11 | Kashima Antlers | 34 | 12 | 10 | 12 | 50 | 43 | +7 | 46 |
| 12 | Júbilo Iwata | 34 | 13 | 7 | 14 | 57 | 53 | +4 | 46 |
| 13 | Omiya Ardija | 34 | 11 | 11 | 12 | 38 | 45 | −7 | 44 |
| 14 | Cerezo Osaka | 34 | 11 | 9 | 14 | 47 | 53 | −6 | 42 |

Updated to match(es) played on 1 December 2012. Source: J.League Division 1
Rules for classification: 1) points; 2) goal difference; 3) number of goals scored.

==== Matches ====
| 10 March 2012 1 | Consadole Sapporo | 0–0 | Júbilo Iwata | Sapporo Dome |
| Saturday 14:04 | | Report | | Attendance: 25,353; Referee: Hirose |

| 17 March 2012 2 | Júbilo Iwata | 2–1 | Sagan Tosu | Yamaha Stadium |
| Saturday 17:04 | Yamada 27'; Komano 34' | Report | 17' Toyoda | Attendance: 10,653; Referee: Takayama |

| 25 March 2012 3 | Gamba Osaka | 1–2 | Júbilo Iwata | Expo '70 Commemorative Stadium |
| Sunday 19:03 | Kurata 84' | Report | 23' Yamamoto; 60' Maeda | Attendance: 15,072; Referee: Iemoto |

| 31 March 2012 4 | Júbilo Iwata | 1–0 | Kashiwa Reysol | Yamaha Stadium |
| Saturday 15:04 | Maeda 26' | Report | | Attendance: 9,042; Referee: Nakamura |

| 7 April 2012 5 | Vegalta Sendai | 2–2 | Júbilo Iwata | Yurtec Stadium Sendai |
| 15:00 JST | Kakuda (yellow card) 43'; Wilson (yellow card) 62' (goal) 90+5'; Sekiguchi 76' (yellow card) 90+1' | Report | Maeda (yellow card) 1'; Suganuma 59'; Yamamoto (yellow card) 61' (goal) 79'; Cho Byung-Kuk (yellow card) 86' | Attendance: 13,147; Referee: Toshimitsu Yoshida |

| 14 April 2012 6 | Shimizu S-Pulse | 3–2 | Júbilo Iwata | Outsourcing Stadium Nihondaira |
| 17:00 JST | Takagi 45+1'; Omae 48', 88'; Muramatsu (yellow card) 50'; Jymmy (yellow card) 55' | Report | Cho Byung-Kuk 13'; Chiyotanda (yellow card) 68'; Yamamoto 90+4' | Attendance: 16,334; Referee: Nobutsugu Murakami |

| 21 April 2012 7 | Júbilo Iwata | 1–0 | Yokohama F. Marinos | Yamaha Stadium |
| 15:00 JST | Yamada 35' | Report | | Attendance: 11,965; Referee: Itaru Hirose |

| 28 April 2012 8 | Cerezo Osaka | 3–2 | Júbilo Iwata | Kincho Stadium |
| 20:00 JST | Kiyotake 20'; Ogihara 47'; Kim Bo-Kyung 83' | Report | Yamada (yellow card) 61' (goal) 87'; Cho Byung-Kuk (yellow card) 75' (goal) 90+2' | Attendance: 12,183; Referee: Yoshiro Imamura |

| 3 May 2012 9 | Kawasaki Frontale | 4–3 | Júbilo Iwata | Todoroki Athletics Stadium |
| 16:00 JST | Oshima 30'; Yajima 53' (pen.), 62'; Tanaka 55'; Igawa (yellow card) 84' | Report | Yamada (yellow card) 13'; Yamamoto (yellow card) 52' (goal) 59', 67'; Abe 90+1' | Attendance: 15,671; Referee: Tomohiro Inoue |

| 6 May 2012 10 | Júbilo Iwata | 2–2 | Urawa Red Diamonds | Yamaha Stadium |
| 17:00 JST | Baek Sung-Dong 25', 71' (yellow card) 43' | Report | Marcio Richardes (yellow card) 21'; Makino 52'; Haraguchi 66' | Attendance: 22,193; Referee: Kazuhiko Matsumura |

| 12 May 2012 11 | Júbilo Iwata | 3–0 | Kashima Antlers | Yamaha Stadium |
| 15:00 JST | Maeda 10'; Kobayashi (yellow card) 60'; Yamamoto (yellow card) 60'; Fujita (yellow card) 66'; Matsuura 85'; Yamada 90' | Report | Ogasawara (yellow card) 32' | Attendance: 13,555; Referee: Nobutsugu Murakami |

| 19 May 2012 12 | Albirex Niigata | 1–6 | Júbilo Iwata | Tohoku Electric Power Big Swan Stadium |
| 16:00 JST | Kim Jin-Su (yellow card) 33' (yellow-red card) 45+2'; Higashiguchi (yellow card) 53'; Kobayashi 63' (o.g.) | Report | Cho Byung-Kuk 7' (yellow card) 62'; Maeda 15', 79'; Kobayashi 48'; Matsuura 68'; Yamazaki (yellow card) 88'; Yamada 90+1' | Attendance: 21,920; Referee: Hiroyuki Kimura |

| 26 May 2012 13 | Júbilo Iwata | 4–0 | Omiya Ardija | Yamaha Stadium |
| 17:00 JST | Yamada 10' (yellow card) 41'; Maeda 29', 79'; Matsuura 46'; Hatta (yellow card) 71'; Yamazaki (yellow card) 86' | Report | Ueda (yellow card) 44'; Rafael Mariano (yellow card) 69' | Attendance: 10,752; Referee: Yoshiro Imamura |

| 16 June 2012 14 | Júbilo Iwata | 1–3 | Vissel Kobe | Yamaha Stadium |
| 20:00 JST | Yamamoto 27' (yellow card) 72'; Yamada (yellow card) 57' | Report | Ogawa 7', 53', 62'; Oya (yellow card) 18'; Nozawa (yellow card) 85' | Attendance: 10,612; Referee: Takuto Okabe |

| 23 June 2012 15 | Nagoya Grampus | 2–0 | Júbilo Iwata | Mizuho Athletic Stadium |
| 20:00 JST | Fujimoto 45+4'; Nagai 46' | Report | Komano (yellow card) 4' | Attendance: 16,862; Referee: Toshimitsu Yoshida |

| 30 June 2012 16 | Júbilo Iwata | 3–1 | F.C. Tokyo | Yamaha Stadium |
| 20:00 JST | Yamamoto 6'; Suganuma (yellow card) 55'; Miyazaki 70'; Cho Byung-Kuk 84'; Oshitani (yellow card) 88' | Report | Kawano 89' | Attendance: 13,923; Referee: Minoru Tojo |

| 7 July 2012 17 | Sanfrecce Hiroshima | 2–0 | Júbilo Iwata | Hiroshima Big Arch |
| 20:00 JST | Nakajima 76'; Kōji Morisaki 90+3' | Report | Fujita (yellow card) 51'; Kobayashi (yellow card) 62' | Attendance: 12,769; Referee: Nobutsugu Murakami |

| 14 July 2012 18 | Júbilo Iwata | 4–1 | Consadole Sapporo | Yamaha Stadium |
| 20:00 JST | Cho Byung-Kuk 25', 29'; Maeda 48'; Rodrigo Souto 52' | Report | Hidaka 49' | Attendance: 11,367; Referee: Koichiro Fukushima |

| 28 July 2012 19 | Urawa Red Diamonds | 2–0 | Júbilo Iwata | Saitama Stadium 2002 |
| 19:00 JST | Kashiwagi 36' (yellow card) 50'; Abe 78' | Report | Cho Byung-Kuk (yellow card) 44'; Kobayashi (yellow card) 66' | Attendance: 28,142; Referee: Yudai Yamamoto |

| 4 August 2012 20 | Júbilo Iwata | 2–2 | Kawasaki Frontale | Yamaha Stadium |
| 20:00 JST | Yamazaki 43'; Igawa 75' (o.g.) | Report | Tanaka 18'; Igawa (yellow card) 60'; Renatinho 82' | Attendance: 12,972; Referee: Hiroyoshi Takayama |

| 11 August 2012 21 | Kashima Antlers | 2–1 | Júbilo Iwata | Kashima Soccer Stadium |
| 19:30 JST | Renato Cajá 19'; Endo 75' | Report | Maeda 3' (yellow card) 38' | Attendance: 14,649; Referee: Tomohiro Inoue |

| 18 August 2012 22 | Júbilo Iwata | 4–3 | Cerezo Osaka | Yamaha Stadium |
| 20:00 JST | Fujita 9'; Suganuma 16'; Maeda 82', 85' | [[[Category:All articles with unsourced statements]] Summary] | Yamaguchi 13'; Ohgihara 26'; Kempes 68' | Attendance: 10,939; Referee: Jumpei Iida |

| 25 August 2012 23 | Kashiwa Reysol | 0–3 | Júbilo Iwata | Hitachi Kashiwa Soccer Stadium |
| 20:00 JST | | [[[Category:All articles with unsourced statements]] Summary] | Yamada 5'; Komano 28'; Maeda 78' | Attendance: 13,248; Referee: Kenji Ogiya |

| 1 September 2012 24 | Júbilo Iwata | 1–1 | Sanfrecce Hiroshima | Yamaha Stadium |
| 20:00 JST | Komano 34'; Fujita (yellow card) 63'; Suganuma (yellow card) 71'; Miyazaki (yellow card) 76' | Summary | Satō 20'; Hwang Seok-Ho (yellow card) 28'; Mizumoto (yellow card) 33' | Attendance: 11,115; Referee: Minoru Tojo |

| 15 September 2012 25 | Vissel Kobe | 1–2 | Júbilo Iwata | Home's Stadium Kobe |
| 20:00 | Ogawa 26'; Okui (yellow card) 33' (yellow-red card) 62' | Summary | Miyazaki (yellow card) 35'; Yamazaki 73'; Yamada 82' | Attendance: 13,091; Referee: Hiroyuki Kimura |

| 22 September 2012 26 | Júbilo Iwata | 0–0 | Albirex Niigata | Yamaha Stadium |
| 17:00 | Yamazaki (yellow card) 5' | Summary | | Attendance: 11,118; Referee: Yoshiro Imamura |

| 29 September 2012 27 | F.C. Tokyo | 2–1 | Júbilo Iwata | Ajinomoto Stadium |
| 15:00 | Edmilson 54'; Vučićević 85' | Summary | Suganuma 9'; Hatta (yellow card) 77' | Attendance: 22,165; Referee: Ryuji Sato |

| 6 October 2012 28 | Júbilo Iwata | 0–1 | Shimizu S-Pulse | Yamaha Stadium |
| 16:30 | Cho Byung-Kuk (yellow card) 74'; Yamada (yellow card) 80' | Summary | Muramatsu 20'; Kawai (yellow card) 33'; Hattanda (yellow card) 55' | Attendance: 28,745; Referee: Jumpei Iida |

| 20 October 2012 29 | Yokohama F. Marinos | 4–0 | Júbilo Iwata | International Stadium Yokohama |
| 15:00 | Marquinhos 14'; Hyodo 35'; Nakamura 71'; Nakamachi 84' | Summary | Yamazaki (yellow card) 59' | Attendance: 21,310; Referee: Hiroyuki Kimura |

| 27 October 2012 30 | Júbilo Iwata | 1–1 | Vegalta Sendai | Yamaha Stadium |
| 15:00 | Yamamoto 84' | Report | Akamine 77' | Attendance: 10,753; Referee: Masaaki Iemoto |

| 7 November 2012 31 | Sagan Tosu | 3–2 | Júbilo Iwata | Tosu Stadium |
| 19:00 | Kim 41'; Toyoda 59', 64' | Report | Yamada 77'; Kanazono 89' | Attendance: 8,155; Referee: Nobutsugu Murakami |

| 17 November 2012 32 | Júbilo Iwata | 0–2 | Nagoya Grampus | Yamaha Stadium |
| 14:00 | | Report | Tanaka 45'; Nagai 90' | Attendance: 8,978; Referee: Yuichi Nishimura |

| 24 November 2012 33 | Omiya Ardija | 2–0 | Júbilo Iwata | NACK5 Stadium Omiya |
| 17:30 | Kanazawa 28'; Watanabe 57' | Report | | Attendance: 12,126; Referee: Hajime Matsuo |

| 1 December 2012 34 | Júbilo Iwata | 2–1 | Gamba Osaka | Yamaha Stadium |
| 15:30 | Maeda 5'; Kobayashi 85' | Report | Kurata 53' | Attendance: 14,389; Referee: Minoru Tōjō |

=== J. League Cup ===
| Team | Pld | W | D | L | GF | GA | GD | Pts |
|---|---|---|---|---|---|---|---|---|
| Cerezo Osaka | 6 | 4 | 0 | 2 | 15 | 7 | +8 | 12 |
| Vegalta Sendai | 6 | 4 | 0 | 2 | 11 | 5 | +4 | 12 |
| Jubilo Iwata | 6 | 4 | 0 | 2 | 10 | 11 | −1 | 12 |
| Urawa Red Diamonds | 6 | 3 | 0 | 3 | 12 | 10 | +2 | 9 |
| Sagan Tosu | 6 | 3 | 0 | 3 | 8 | 16 | −8 | 9 |
| Sanfrecce Hiroshima | 6 | 1 | 1 | 4 | 8 | 11 | −3 | 4 |
| Kawasaki Frontale | 6 | 1 | 1 | 4 | 7 | 11 | −4 | 4 |

| 20 March 2012 Group A | Júbilo Iwata | 2–1 | Cerezo Osaka | Yamaha Stadium |
| Tuesday 19:04 | Matsuura 59'; Maeda 88' | Report | 38' Branquinho | Attendance: 8,036; Referee: Kimura |

| 4 April 2012 Group A | Júbilo Iwata | 4–3 | Urawa Red Diamonds | Yamaha Stadium |
| Wednesday 19:04 | Maeda 7'; Chiyotanda 57'; Matsuura 77'; Yamada 82' | Report | 34' Kojima; 45+1' Own-goal; 79' Takahashi | Attendance: 7,824; Referee: Ogiya |

| 18 April 2012 Group A | Júbilo Iwata | 1–0 | Sanfrecce Hiroshima | Yamaha Stadium |
| 20:00 JST | Kobayashi (yellow card) 19'; Abe (yellow card) 73'; Yamada 85'; Fujita (yellow card) 86'; Miyazaki (yellow card) 90+1' | Report | Shimizu (yellow card) 64'; Moriwaki (yellow card) 77' | Attendance: 6,372; Referee: (Japan) Minoru Tojo |

| 16 May 2012 Group A | Sagan Tosu | 3–2 | Júbilo Iwata | Tosu Stadium |
| 20:00 JST | Inzuka 12', 65'; Tozin (yellow card) 51'; Hayasaka 63'; Akahoshi (yellow card) 64'; Noda (yellow card) 80' | Report | Kanazawa (yellow card) 37'; Matsuoka 52'; Matsuura (yellow card) 77'; Yamamoto (yellow card) 82'; Yamada 88'; Suganuma (yellow card) 90+6' | Attendance: 4,642; Referee: (Japan) Ryuji Sato |

| 9 June 2012 Group A | Kawasaki Frontale | 0–1 | Júbilo Iwata | Todoroki Athletics Stadium |
| 17:00 JST | | Report | Yamazaki 25' | Attendance: 7,970; Referee: (Japan) Jumpei Iida |

| 27 June 2012 Group A | Vegalta Sendai | 4–0 | Júbilo Iwata | Yurtec Stadium Sendai |
| 20:00 JST | Ota 23'; Kakuda (yellow card) 40'; Wilson 56'; Akamine 69'; Watanabe 78' | Report | Yamamoto (yellow card) 53'; Fujita (yellow card) 90+5' | Attendance: 9,865; Referee: (Japan) Hiroyuki Kimura |

=== Emperor's Cup ===
| 9 September 2012 Second round | Júbilo Iwata | 7–0 | F.C. Suzuka Rampole | Iwata, Shizuoka |
| 13:00 | 15' o.g. Kobayashi 40'; Oshitani 48'; Yamazaki 54', 61'; Han Sang-Woon 66'; Abe 90+1' | Report | | Stadium: Yamaha Stadium; Attendance: 2,808; Referee: Toshimitsu Yoshida |

| 10 October 2012 Third round | Júbilo Iwata | 1–1 (5–3 p) | Kyoto Sanga | Iwata, Shizuoka |
| 19:00 | Yamamoto 109' | Report | Atsutaka Nakamura 120' | Stadium: Yamaha Stadium; Attendance: 2,756; Referee: Hajime Matsuo |
| | Penalties |
| | Ryohei Yamazaki (penalty scored); Hiroki Yamada (penalty scored); Kosuke Yamamoto (penalty scored); Rodrigo Souto (penalty scored); Jo Kanazawa (penalty scored) | | (penalty scored) Jun Ando; (penalty scored) Kazuki Hara; (penalty scored) Atsutaka Nakamura; (penalty missed) Shun Nagasawa |

| 15 December 2012 Fourth round | Kashima Antlers | 3–1 | Júbilo Iwata | Kashima Soccer Stadium, Kashima |
| 13:00 | Iwamasa 5'; Dutra 14'; Juninho 25' | Report | Maeda 1' | Attendance: 7,522; Referee: Iida |
