= Kohei Usui =

Japanese footballer

Kohei Usui 臼井 幸平
Personal information
- Full name: Kohei Usui
- Date of birth: July 16, 1979 (age 47)
- Place of birth: Yokohama, Japan
- Height: 1.67 m (5 ft 5 1/2 in)
- Position: Defender

Youth career
- 1995–1997: Bellmare Hiratsuka

Senior career*
Years	Team	Apps	(Gls)
1998–2000	Shonan Bellmare	25	(0)
2002–2004	Yokohama FC	112	(12)
2005–2007	Montedio Yamagata	111	(4)
2008–2011	Shonan Bellmare	139	(7)
2012	Tochigi SC	1	(0)
Total		388	(23)
- * Club domestic league appearances and goals

Kohei Usui (臼井 幸平, Usui Kohei; born July 16, 1979) is a former Japanese football player.

== Playing career ==
Usui was born in Yokohama on July 16, 1979. He joined J1 League club Bellmare Hiratsuka (later Shonan Bellmare) from youth team in 1998. He played many matches as right side midfielder. However the club was relegated to J2 League from 2000. He also could hardly play in the match in 2000 and left the club end of 2000 season. After 1 year blank, he joined his local club Yokohama FC. He became a regular player as right side back and right side midfielder. In 2005, he moved to Montedio Yamagata. He played as regular right side back. In 2008, he moved to Shonan Bellmare for the first time in 8 years. He played as regular right side back and the club was promoted to J1 from 2010. In 2010, although he played in J1 for the first time in 11 years, the club finished at bottom place and was relegated to J2 in a year. In 2012, he moved to Tochigi SC. However he could hardly play in the match and retired in July 2012.

== Career statistics ==
Appearances and goals by club, season and competition
Club	Season	League			Emperor's Cup		J.League Cup		Total	
Club	Season	Division	Apps	Goals	Apps	Goals	Apps	Goals	Apps	Goals
Bellmare Hiratsuka	1998	J1 League	9	0	1	0	0	0	10	0
Bellmare Hiratsuka	1999	J1 League	13	0	0	0	1	0	14	0
Shonan Bellmare	2000	J2 League	3	0	0	0	0	0	3	0
Yokohama FC	2002	J2 League	32	1	0	0	—		32	1
Yokohama FC	2003	J2 League	39	4	3	0	—		42	4
Yokohama FC	2004	J2 League	41	7	3	1	—		44	8
Montedio Yamagata	2005	J2 League	40	1	2	0	—		42	1
Montedio Yamagata	2006	J2 League	44	1	2	0	—		46	1
Montedio Yamagata	2007	J2 League	27	2	1	0	—		28	2
Shonan Bellmare	2008	J2 League	32	0	1	0	—		33	0
Shonan Bellmare	2009	J2 League	50	4	0	0	—		50	4
Shonan Bellmare	2010	J1 League	26	0	2	0	4	0	32	0
Shonan Bellmare	2011	J2 League	31	3	0	0	—		31	3
Tochigi SC	2012	J2 League	1	0	0	0	—		1	0
Career total			388	23	15	1	5	0	408	24
