= Adiel (footballer) =

Brazilian footballer (born 1980)

Personal information
- Full name: Adiel de Oliveira Amorim
- Date of birth: 13 August 1980 (age 46)
- Place of birth: Cubatão, Brazil
- Height: 1.66 m (5 ft 5 in)
- Position: Midfielder

Youth career
- Santos

Senior career*
Years	Team	Apps	(Gls)
1997–2000	Santos	28	(0)
2000	Urawa Reds	10	(2)
2001	Botafogo SP	18	(3)
2002–2004	Santos	4	(0)
2005	Al Qadisiya		
2006–2011	Shonan Bellmare	151	(44)
2012	Wuhan Zall	29	(1)
2013	Hubei China-Kyle	29	(6)
2015–2016	Juventus-SP	18	(0)
2017	Portuguesa Santista	0	(0)
- * Club domestic league appearances and goals as of 17 July 2010

Adiel de Oliveira Amorim (born 13 August 1980), known simply as Adiel, is a Brazilian former professional footballer who played as a midfielder.

== Club statistics ==
Club performance			League		Cup		League Cup		Total	
Season	Club	League	Apps	Goals	Apps	Goals	Apps	Goals	Apps	Goals
Brazil			League		Copa do Brasil		League Cup		Total	
1997	Santos	Série A	0	0					0	0
1998	Santos	Série A	19	0					19	0
1999	Santos	Série A	9	0					9	0
2000	Santos	Série A	0	0					0	0
Japan			League		Emperor's Cup		J.League Cup		Total	
2000	Urawa Reds	J2 League	10	2	4	1	0	0	14	3
Brazil			League		Copa do Brasil		League Cup		Total	
2001	Botafogo-SP	Série A	18	3					18	3
2002	Santos	Série A	4	0					4	0
2003	Santos	Série A	0	0					0	0
2004	Santos	Série A	0	0					0	0
Kuwait			League		Emir Cup		League Cup		Total	
2004/05	Al-Qadsia	Premier League								
2005/06	Al-Qadsia	Premier League								
Japan			League		Emperor's Cup		J.League Cup		Total	
2006	Shonan Bellmare	J2 League	42	12	2	2	-		44	14
2007	Shonan Bellmare	J2 League	41	12	2	0	-		43	12
2008	Shonan Bellmare	J2 League	26	9	0	0	-		26	9
2009	Shonan Bellmare	J2 League	42	11	0	0	-		42	11
2010	Shonan Bellmare	J1 League	0	0	0	0	0	0	0	0
2011	Shonan Bellmare	J2 League	35	4	2	1	-		37	5
Country	Brazil		50	3					50	3
Country	Japan		196	50	10	4	0	0	206	54
Country	Kuwait									
Total			211	49	8	3	0	0	219	52

== Honours ==
Club

Santos

- Copa CONMEBOL: 1998
- Campeonato Brasileiro Série A: 2002

International

Brazil U17

- FIFA U-17 World Championship: 1997
