= Yuya Nakamura =

Yuya Nakamura may refer to:

- Yuya Nakamura (footballer, born 1986) (中村 祐也), Japanese footballer
- Enhō Akira, born Yuya Nakamura, Japanese sumo wrestler
