= Koji Sakamoto =

Japanese footballer

Koji Sakamoto 坂本 紘司
Personal information
- Full name: Koji Sakamoto
- Date of birth: December 3, 1978 (age 47)
- Place of birth: Yasu, Shiga, Japan
- Height: 1.75 m (5 ft 9 in)
- Position: Midfielder

Youth career
- 1994–1996: Shizuoka Gakuen High School

Senior career*
Years	Team	Apps	(Gls)
1997–1999	Júbilo Iwata	0	(0)
2000–2012	Shonan Bellmare	456	(57)
Total		456	(57)
Medal record
Júbilo Iwata
Winner	J1 League	1997
Winner	J1 League	1999
Runner-up	J1 League	1998
Winner	J.League Cup	1998
Runner-up	J.League Cup	1997
- * Club domestic league appearances and goals

Koji Sakamoto (坂本 紘司, Sakamoto Koji; born December 3, 1978) is a former Japanese football player.

== Playing career ==
Sakamoto was born in Yasu on December 3, 1978. After graduating from Shizuoka Gakuen High School, he joined J1 League club Júbilo Iwata in 1997. Although he played several matches as substitute forward in J.League Cup, he could hardly play in the match. In 2000, he moved to J2 League club Shonan Bellmare. Although he could not play at all in the match in 2000, he became a regular player as offensive midfielder from 2001 and played many matches for a long time. In 2007, he was converted to defensive midfielder. However he was returned to offensive midfielder by manager Yasuharu Sorimachi in 2009. The club also won the 3rd place in 2009 and was promoted to J1 from 2010. However the club finished at bottom place in 2010 and was relegated to J2 in a year. In 2012, he lost his regular position and played many matches as substitute. He retired end of 2012 season.

Sakamoto played 456 J.League games for Shonan Bellmare (a club record) between 2000 and 2012, also being for many years the team's captain.

== Club statistics ==
Club	Season	League		Emperor's Cup		J.League Cup		Total	
Club	Season	Apps	Goals	Apps	Goals	Apps	Goals	Apps	Goals
Júbilo Iwata	1997	0	0	0	0	2	0	2	0
Júbilo Iwata	1998	0	0	0	0	0	0	0	0
Júbilo Iwata	1999	0	0	0	0	2	0	2	0
Shonan Bellmare	2000	0	0	0	0	0	0	0	0
Shonan Bellmare	2001	39	8	2	5	0	0	41	13
Shonan Bellmare	2002	38	7	4	3	–		42	10
Shonan Bellmare	2003	44	4	4	1	–		48	5
Shonan Bellmare	2004	38	8	3	1	–		41	9
Shonan Bellmare	2005	35	1	3	1	–		38	2
Shonan Bellmare	2006	39	1	1	0	–		40	1
Shonan Bellmare	2007	44	3	2	0	–		46	3
Shonan Bellmare	2008	39	3	1	0	–		40	3
Shonan Bellmare	2009	50	13	0	0	–		50	13
Shonan Bellmare	2010	30	3	1	0	2	1	33	4
Shonan Bellmare	2011	35	6	4	1	–		39	7
Shonan Bellmare	2012	25	0	0	0	–		25	0
Career total		456	57	26	13	5	0	487	70
