= Yoshiro Abe =

Japanese footballer

Yoshiro Abe 阿部 吉朗
Personal information
- Full name: Yoshiro Abe
- Date of birth: July 5, 1980 (age 46)
- Place of birth: Niihama, Ehime, Japan
- Height: 1.74 m (5 ft 8 1/2 in)
- Position: Forward

Youth career
- 1996–1998: Joso Gakuin High School
- 1999–2002: Ryutsu Keizai University

Senior career*
Years	Team	Apps	(Gls)
2002–2006	FC Tokyo	82	(15)
2005	→Oita Trinita (loan)	15	(0)
2007	Kashiwa Reysol	8	(0)
2008–2010	Shonan Bellmare	108	(25)
2011	Ventforet Kofu	24	(4)
2012–2014	Júbilo Iwata	47	(6)
2015	Matsumoto Yamaga FC	24	(5)
Total		308	(55)
Medal record
FC Tokyo
Winner	J.League Cup	2004
- * Club domestic league appearances and goals

Yoshiro Abe (阿部 吉朗, Abe Yoshirō; born July 5, 1980) is a former Japanese football player.

== Early life ==
Abe was born in Niihama on July 5, 1980.

== Playing career ==
He joined J1 League club FC Tokyo from Ryutsu Keizai University in November 2002. He played many matches as substitute forward from 2003.

In 2005, he moved to Oita Trinita on loan. However, he failed to score in his appearances and returned to FC Tokyo in August. Although he played many matches in 2005, his opportunity to play decreased in 2006.

In 2007, he moved to Kashiwa Reysol. However he could not play many matches.

In 2008, he moved to J2 League club Shonan Bellmare. He played many matches and Bellmare was promoted to the J1 league at the end of the 2009 season. Although he played all 34 matches in the 2010 season, Bellmare was relegated to the J2 league.

In 2011, he moved to newly was promoted to J1 League club, Ventforet Kofu. Although he played many matches, he could hardly play in the summer matches and Ventforet were relegated to the J2 league.

In 2012, he moved to J1 club Júbilo Iwata. Although he played many matches, Júbilo was relegated to the J2 end of 2013 season.

In 2015, he moved to newly promoted J1 League club, Matsumoto Yamaga FC. He made his debut for Matsumoto against Urawa Red Diamonds on the 4th of April 2015. He scored his first goal for Matsumoto against Kashiwa Reysol, scoring in the 90th+1st minute. He retired at the end of the 2015 season.

== Club statistics ==
Appearances and goals by club, season and competition
Club	Season	League			Emperor's Cup		J.League Cup		Total	
Club	Season	Division	Apps	Goals	Apps	Goals	Apps	Goals	Apps	Goals
FC Tokyo	2002	J1 League	0	0	1	2	0	0	1	2
FC Tokyo	2003	J1 League	27	6	2	2	7	2	36	10
FC Tokyo	2004	J1 League	28	4	3	1	8	1	39	6
FC Tokyo	Total		55	10	6	5	15	3	76	18
Oita Trinita	2005	J1 League	15	0	0	0	6	1	21	1
FC Tokyo	2005	J1 League	13	3	2	1	0	0	15	4
FC Tokyo	2006	J1 League	14	2	2	0	4	0	20	2
FC Tokyo	Total		27	5	4	1	4	0	35	6
Kashiwa Reysol	2007	J1 League	8	0	0	0	6	0	14	0
Shonan Bellmare	2008	J2 League	26	6	1	0	-		27	6
Shonan Bellmare	2009	J2 League	48	10	0	0	-		48	10
Shonan Bellmare	2010	J1 League	34	9	1	1	5	0	40	10
Shonan Bellmare	Total		108	25	2	1	5	0	115	26
Ventforet Kofu	2011	J1 League	24	4	0	0	1	0	25	4
Júbilo Iwata	2012	J1 League	17	1	2	1	3	0	22	2
Júbilo Iwata	2013	J1 League	10	2	2	1	2	0	14	3
Júbilo Iwata	2014	J2 League	20	3	4	0	-		24	3
Júbilo Iwata	Total		47	6	8	1	5	0	60	7
Matsumoto Yamaga FC	2015	J1 League	24	5	4	0	4	0	32	5
Career total			308	55	22	9	46	4	376	68
