= 2001 Shonan Bellmare season =

Shonan Bellmare
2001 season
- Manager: Koji Tanaka
- Stadium: Hiratsuka Athletics Stadium
- J.League 2: 8th
- Emperor's Cup: 2nd Round
- J.League Cup: 1st Round
- Top goalscorer: Keisuke Kurihara (17); Yasunori Takada (17)
Home colours	Away colours

2001 Shonan Bellmare season

== Competitions ==
Competitions	Position
J.League 2	8th / 12 clubs
Emperor's Cup	2nd round
J.League Cup	1st round

== Domestic results ==
=== J.League 2 ===
10 March 2001 1	Shonan Bellmare	1-0	Yokohama FC	Hiratsuka Athletics Stadium
JST (UTC+09)

17 March 2001 2	Ventforet Kofu	0-3	Shonan Bellmare	Kose Sports Park Stadium
JST (UTC+09)

24 March 2001 3	Shonan Bellmare	1-0 (GG) (a.e.t.)	Sagan Tosu	Hiratsuka Athletics Stadium
JST (UTC+09)

31 March 2001 4	Kyoto Purple Sanga	2-1	Shonan Bellmare	Nishikyogoku Athletic Stadium
JST (UTC+09)

7 April 2001 5	Shonan Bellmare	3-2 (GG) (a.e.t.)	Albirex Niigata	Hiratsuka Athletics Stadium
JST (UTC+09)

14 April 2001 6	Kawasaki Frontale	1-2	Shonan Bellmare	Todoroki Athletics Stadium
JST (UTC+09)

21 April 2001 7	Shonan Bellmare	3-2 (GG) (a.e.t.)	Montedio Yamagata	Hiratsuka Athletics Stadium
JST (UTC+09)

28 April 2001 8	Shonan Bellmare	2-3	Vegalta Sendai	Hiratsuka Athletics Stadium
JST (UTC+09)

3 May 2001 9	Oita Trinita	1-0	Shonan Bellmare	Oita Athletic Stadium
JST (UTC+09)

6 May 2001 10	Shonan Bellmare	3-3 (GG) (a.e.t.)	Omiya Ardija	Hiratsuka Athletics Stadium
JST (UTC+09)

12 May 2001 11	Mito HollyHock	0-1	Shonan Bellmare	Hitachinaka City Stadium
JST (UTC+09)

19 May 2001 12	Shonan Bellmare	4-1	Ventforet Kofu	Hiratsuka Athletics Stadium
JST (UTC+09)

23 May 2001 13	Sagan Tosu	1-2	Shonan Bellmare	Tosu Stadium
JST (UTC+09)

26 May 2001 14	Shonan Bellmare	2-0	Kawasaki Frontale	Hiratsuka Athletics Stadium
JST (UTC+09)

17 June 2001 15	Montedio Yamagata	1-2	Shonan Bellmare	Yamagata Park Stadium
JST (UTC+09)

24 June 2001 16	Omiya Ardija	3-0	Shonan Bellmare	Omiya Football Stadium
JST (UTC+09)

29 June 2001 17	Shonan Bellmare	1-1 (GG) (a.e.t.)	Mito HollyHock	Hiratsuka Athletics Stadium
JST (UTC+09)

7 July 2001 18	Vegalta Sendai	1-0	Shonan Bellmare	Sendai Stadium
JST (UTC+09)

11 July 2001 19	Shonan Bellmare	2-2 (GG) (a.e.t.)	Oita Trinita	Hiratsuka Athletics Stadium
JST (UTC+09)

14 July 2001 20	Yokohama FC	2-1	Shonan Bellmare	Yokohama Mitsuzawa Stadium
JST (UTC+09)

21 July 2001 21	Shonan Bellmare	0-2	Kyoto Purple Sanga	Hiratsuka Athletics Stadium
JST (UTC+09)

25 July 2001 22	Albirex Niigata	2-0	Shonan Bellmare	Niigata Stadium
JST (UTC+09)

28 July 2001 23	Mito HollyHock	0-1	Shonan Bellmare	Hitachinaka City Stadium
JST (UTC+09)

3 August 2001 24	Shonan Bellmare	1-2 (GG) (a.e.t.)	Sagan Tosu	Hiratsuka Athletics Stadium
JST (UTC+09)

11 August 2001 25	Shonan Bellmare	0-1	Vegalta Sendai	Hiratsuka Athletics Stadium
JST (UTC+09)

14 August 2001 26	Oita Trinita	1-0	Shonan Bellmare	Oita Athletic Stadium
JST (UTC+09)

18 August 2001 27	Kawasaki Frontale	2-0	Shonan Bellmare	Todoroki Athletics Stadium
JST (UTC+09)

25 August 2001 28	Shonan Bellmare	1-3	Montedio Yamagata	Hiratsuka Athletics Stadium
JST (UTC+09)

1 September 2001 29	Kyoto Purple Sanga	1-2	Shonan Bellmare	Nishikyogoku Athletic Stadium
JST (UTC+09)

5 September 2001 30	Shonan Bellmare	1-0 (GG) (a.e.t.)	Albirex Niigata	Hiratsuka Athletics Stadium
JST (UTC+09)

8 September 2001 31	Shonan Bellmare	2-1	Omiya Ardija	Hiratsuka Athletics Stadium
JST (UTC+09)

15 September 2001 32	Ventforet Kofu	1-1 (GG) (a.e.t.)	Shonan Bellmare	Kose Sports Park Stadium
JST (UTC+09)

19 September 2001 33	Shonan Bellmare	1-0	Yokohama FC	Hiratsuka Athletics Stadium
JST (UTC+09)

23 September 2001 34	Vegalta Sendai	3-2	Shonan Bellmare	Sendai Stadium
JST (UTC+09)

30 September 2001 35	Montedio Yamagata	2-1	Shonan Bellmare	Yamagata Park Stadium
JST (UTC+09)

6 October 2001 36	Shonan Bellmare	2-1	Kawasaki Frontale	Hiratsuka Athletics Stadium
JST (UTC+09)

13 October 2001 37	Shonan Bellmare	1-3	Oita Trinita	Hiratsuka Athletics Stadium
JST (UTC+09)

17 October 2001 38	Omiya Ardija	1-2	Shonan Bellmare	Omiya Football Stadium
JST (UTC+09)

20 October 2001 39	Shonan Bellmare	1-2	Mito HollyHock	Hiratsuka Athletics Stadium
JST (UTC+09)

28 October 2001 40	Yokohama FC	0-5	Shonan Bellmare	Yokohama Mitsuzawa Stadium
JST (UTC+09)

3 November 2001 41	Shonan Bellmare	2-0	Ventforet Kofu	Hiratsuka Athletics Stadium
JST (UTC+09)

6 November 2001 42	Sagan Tosu	2-1	Shonan Bellmare	Tosu Stadium
JST (UTC+09)

10 November 2001 43	Shonan Bellmare	1-2	Kyoto Purple Sanga	Hiratsuka Athletics Stadium
JST (UTC+09)

18 November 2001 44	Albirex Niigata	3-2 (GG) (a.e.t.)	Shonan Bellmare	Niigata Stadium
JST (UTC+09)

=== Emperor's Cup ===
25 November 2001 1st Round	Muchz F.C.	0-7	Shonan Bellmare	Ojiyama Stadium
JST (UTC+09)

2 December 2001 2nd Round	Shonan Bellmare	0-0 (GG) (a.e.t.) (3-4 p)	Nara Sangyo University	Hiratsuka Athletics Stadium
JST (UTC+09)

=== J.League Cup ===
4 April 2001 1st Round-1	Shonan Bellmare	0-1	Kashiwa Reysol	Hiratsuka Athletics Stadium
JST (UTC+09)

18 April 2001 1st Round-2	Kashiwa Reysol	0-0 (1-0 agg.)	Shonan Bellmare	Hitachi Kashiwa Soccer Stadium
JST (UTC+09)

== Player statistics ==
No.	Pos.	Nat.	Player	D.o.B. (Age)	Height / Weight	J.League 2		Emperor's Cup		J.League Cup		Total	
No.	Pos.	Nat.	Player	D.o.B. (Age)	Height / Weight	Apps	Goals	Apps	Goals	Apps	Goals	Apps	Goals
1	GK	(Japan)	Yuji Ito	May 20, 1965 (aged 35)	cm / kg	38	0						
2	DF	(Japan)	Jun Ideguchi	May 14, 1979 (aged 21)	cm / kg	29	1						
3	DF	(Japan)	Takuya Kawaguchi	October 11, 1978 (aged 22)	cm / kg	25	0						
4	DF	(Colombia)	Ever Palacios	January 18, 1969 (aged 32)	cm / kg	39	3						
5	DF	(Japan)	Hiroyuki Shirai	June 17, 1974 (aged 26)	cm / kg	15	0						
6	MF	(Japan)	Takafumi Hori	September 10, 1967 (aged 33)	cm / kg	33	1						
7	FW	(Colombia)	James Angulo	January 20, 1974 (aged 27)	cm / kg	12	2						
7	MF	(Colombia)	Arley Dinas	May 16, 1974 (aged 26)	cm / kg	18	1						
8	MF	(Japan)	Keisuke Kurihara	May 20, 1973 (aged 27)	cm / kg	33	17						
9	FW	(Japan)	Yasunori Takada	February 22, 1979 (aged 22)	cm / kg	41	17						
10	MF	(Colombia)	Hernán Gaviria	November 27, 1969 (aged 31)	cm / kg	23	4						
11	FW	(Japan)	Ryo Sakai	August 9, 1977 (aged 23)	cm / kg	15	1						
13	MF	(Japan)	Junichi Watanabe	May 20, 1973 (aged 27)	cm / kg	7	0						
14	DF	(Japan)	Yasuhide Ihara	March 8, 1973 (aged 28)	cm / kg	32	2						
15	MF	(Japan)	Nobuhiro Sadatomi	July 5, 1979 (aged 21)	cm / kg	3	0						
16	GK	(Japan)	Tomohiko Ito	May 28, 1978 (aged 22)	cm / kg	1	0						
17	MF	(Japan)	Suguru Ito	September 7, 1975 (aged 25)	cm / kg	5	0						
18	MF	(Japan)	Koji Sakamoto	December 3, 1978 (aged 22)	cm / kg	39	8						
19	FW	(Japan)	Tatsuhiro Nishimoto	April 29, 1980 (aged 20)	cm / kg	16	0						
20	FW	(Japan)	Manabu Komatsubara	April 2, 1981 (aged 19)	cm / kg	5	0						
21	GK	(Japan)	Masahito Suzuki	April 28, 1977 (aged 23)	cm / kg	5	0						
22	DF	(Japan)	Teruyuki Moniwa	September 8, 1981 (aged 19)	cm / kg	29	0						
23	DF	(Japan)	Yu Tokisaki	June 15, 1979 (aged 21)	cm / kg	3	0						
24	MF	(Japan)	Kazuhiko Tanabe	June 3, 1981 (aged 19)	cm / kg	4	0						
25	MF	(Japan)	Daisuke Kimori	July 28, 1977 (aged 23)	cm / kg	16	1						
26	GK	(Japan)	Takashi Takusagawa	February 12, 1981 (aged 20)	cm / kg	0	0						
27	MF	(Japan)	Koji Nakazato	April 24, 1982 (aged 18)	cm / kg	31	1						
28	MF	(Japan)	Yoshikazu Suzuki	June 1, 1982 (aged 18)	cm / kg	43	5						
29	DF	(Japan)	Kei Sugimoto	June 4, 1982 (aged 18)	cm / kg	9	0						
30	DF	(Japan)	Kenichiro Tokura	May 31, 1971 (aged 29)	cm / kg	15	0						
31	FW	(Japan)	Takuma Sugano	April 5, 1980 (aged 20)	cm / kg	11	0						

== Other pages ==
- (in Japanese) J. League official site
