= Manabu Komatsubara =

Japanese footballer

Manabu Komatsubara 小松原 学
Personal information
- Full name: Manabu Komatsubara
- Date of birth: April 2, 1981 (age 45)
- Place of birth: Gunma, Japan
- Height: 1.82 m (5 ft 11 1/2 in)
- Position: Forward

Youth career
- 1997: Bellmare Hiratsuka

Senior career*
Years	Team	Apps	(Gls)
1998–2001	Shonan Bellmare	53	(8)
2002	Ventforet Kofu	8	(1)
2004–2005	FC Horikoshi		
Total		61	(9)
- * Club domestic league appearances and goals

Manabu Komatsubara (小松原 学, Komatsubara Manabu; born April 2, 1981) is a former Japanese football player.

== Playing career ==
Komatsubara was born in Gunma Prefecture on April 2, 1981. He joined the J1 League club Bellmare Hiratsuka (later Shonan Bellmare) youth team in 1998. On April 11, he debuted against Cerezo Osaka when he was 17 years old, which made him the youngest player who played in the J1 League. The club released many players due to their financial problems at the end of the 1998 season. In 1999, he played often and the club had many young players. However the club finished in last place in 1999 and was relegated to the J2 League in 2000. He also did not play as much in 2000. In 2002, he moved to Ventforet Kofu. However he did not play often and left the club at the end of the 2002 season. After one year, he joined his local club, the FC Horikoshi, in 2004. He retired at the end of the 2005 season.

== Club statistics ==
Club performance			League		Cup		League Cup		Total	
Season	Club	League	Apps	Goals	Apps	Goals	Apps	Goals	Apps	Goals
Japan			League		Emperor's Cup		J.League Cup		Total	
1998	Bellmare Hiratsuka	J1 League	3	0			2	0	5	0
1999	Bellmare Hiratsuka	J1 League	25	4			1	0	26	4
2000	Shonan Bellmare	J2 League	20	4			2	0	22	4
2001	Shonan Bellmare	J2 League	5	0			0	0	5	0
2002	Ventforet Kofu	J2 League	8	1			-		8	1
Total			61	9	0	0	5	0	66	9
