= Ángel Ortiz (footballer, born 1977) =

Paraguayan footballer (born 1977)

Personal information
- Full name: Ángel Antonio Ortiz Cabrera
- Date of birth: 27 December 1977 (age 48)
- Place of birth: Aregua, Paraguay
- Height: 1.81 m (5 ft 11 1/2 in)
- Position: Midfielder

Senior career*
Years	Team	Apps	(Gls)
1999	Guaraní		
2000	Shonan Bellmare		
2001–2003	Guaraní		
2004–2005	Libertad	37	(1)
2005–2006	Lanús		
2006	Guaraní		
2007–2008	Olimpia	39	(0)
2008	Guaraní		
2009	12 Octubre	16	(0)
2009	Sportivo Luqueño	22	(0)
2010	Guaraní	31	(0)
2011	Sportivo Luqueño	19	(2)
2011	Guaraní	6	(0)
2012	Independiente	3	(0)

International career
2003–2007	Paraguay	27	(0)
- * Club domestic league appearances and goals

Ángel Antonio Ortiz Cabrera (born 27 December 1977) is a Paraguayan retired football player.

== Club statistics ==
Club performance			League	
Season	Club	League	Apps	Goals
Paraguay			League	
1999	Guaraní	Primera División	0	0
Japan			League	
2000	Shonan Bellmare	J2 League	10	0
Paraguay			League	
2001	Guaraní	Primera División	20	1
2002	Guaraní	Primera División	24	0
2003	Guaraní	Primera División	29	5
2004	Libertad	Primera División	26	0
2005	Libertad	Primera División	12	1
Argentina			League	
2005–06	Lanús	Primera División	3	0
Paraguay			League	
2006	Guaraní	Primera División	14	0
2007	Olimpia	Primera División	26	0
2008	Olimpia	Primera División	12	1
2008	Guaraní	Primera División	18	0
2009	12 Octubre	Primera División	16	0
2009	Sportivo Luqueño	Primera División	20	0
2010	Guaraní	Primera División	31	0
Country	Paraguay		248	8
Country	Japan		10	0
Country	Argentina		3	0
Total			261	8

== National team statistics ==
Paraguay national team
Year	Apps	Goals
2003	13	0
2004	6	0
2005	7	0
2006	0	0
2007	1	0
Total	27	0
