= Yutaka Tahara =

Japanese footballer

Yutaka Tahara 田原 豊
Personal information
- Full name: Yutaka Tahara
- Date of birth: April 27, 1982 (age 44)
- Place of birth: Aira, Kagoshima, Japan
- Height: 1.87 m (6 ft 1 1/2 in)
- Position: Forward

Youth career
- 1998–2000: Kagoshima Jitsugyo High School

Senior career*
Years	Team	Apps	(Gls)
2001–2002	Yokohama F. Marinos	13	(1)
2002–2008	Kyoto Sanga FC	144	(32)
2009–2011	Shonan Bellmare	93	(21)
2012–2013	Yokohama FC	53	(8)
2014	Samut Songkhram		
2015	Kagoshima United FC	1	(0)
Total		304	(62)

International career
2001	Japan U-20	3	(1)
Medal record
Yokohama F. Marinos
Runner-up	J1 League	2002
Winner	J.League Cup	2001
Kyoto Sanga FC
Winner	Emperor's Cup	2002
Representing Japan
AFC U-19 Championship
Silver medal – second place	2000 Iran
- * Club domestic league appearances and goals

Yutaka Tahara (田原 豊, Tahara Yutaka; born April 27, 1982) is a former Japanese football player.

== Club career ==
Tahara was born in Aira on April 27, 1982. After graduating from high school, he joined Yokohama F. Marinos in 2001. However he could hardly play in the match and he moved to Kyoto Purple Sanga (later Kyoto Sanga FC) in September 2002. His opportunity to play decreased and he played many matches from 2004. He moved to Shonan Bellmare in 2009 and Yokohama FC in 2012. In 2014, he moved to Thailand and joined Samut Songkhram. In 2015, he returned to Japan and his local club Kagoshima United FC. He retired end of 2015 season.

== National team career ==
In June 2001, Tahara was selected Japan U-20 national team for 2001 World Youth Championship. At this tournament, he played all 3 matches and scored a goal against Czech Republic.

== Club statistics ==
Club performance			League		Cup		League Cup		Total	
Season	Club	League	Apps	Goals	Apps	Goals	Apps	Goals	Apps	Goals
Japan			League		Emperor's Cup		J.League Cup		Total	
2001	Yokohama F. Marinos	J1 League	13	1	0	0	1	0	14	1
2002	Yokohama F. Marinos	J1 League	0	0	0	0	0	0	0	0
2002	Kyoto Purple Sanga	J1 League	5	1	3	1	-		8	2
2003	Kyoto Purple Sanga	J1 League	10	1	1	0	2	0	13	1
2004	Kyoto Purple Sanga	J2 League	26	6	2	4	-		28	10
2005	Kyoto Purple Sanga	J2 League	32	9	2	1	-		34	10
2006	Kyoto Purple Sanga	J1 League	16	1	0	0	3	1	19	2
2007	Kyoto Sanga FC	J2 League	31	9	1	0	-		32	9
2008	Kyoto Sanga FC	J1 League	24	5	1	0	5	1	30	6
2009	Shonan Bellmare	J2 League	41	10	1	0	-		42	10
2010	Shonan Bellmare	J1 League	27	4	2	0	3	1	32	5
2011	Shonan Bellmare	J2 League	25	7	3	0	-		28	7
2012	Yokohama FC	J2 League	30	7	0	0	-		30	7
2013	Yokohama FC	J2 League	23	1	0	0	-		23	1
2015	Kagoshima United FC	Football League	1	0	0	0	-		1	0
Career total			304	62	16	6	14	3	334	71
