= Takuya Kawaguchi =

Japanese footballer

Takuya Kawaguchi 川口 卓哉
Personal information
- Full name: Takuya Kawaguchi
- Date of birth: October 11, 1978 (age 48)
- Place of birth: Hokkaido, Japan
- Height: 1.81 m (5 ft 11 1/2 in)
- Position: Defender

Youth career
- 1994–1996: Sapporo Shiroishi High School

Senior career*
Years	Team	Apps	(Gls)
1997–2001	Shonan Bellmare	82	(3)
2002	Tokyo Verdy	8	(0)
2003	Consadole Sapporo	21	(0)
Total		111	(3)

International career
1995	Japan U-17	3	(0)
Medal record
Representing Japan
AFC U-16 Championship
Gold medal – first place	1994 Qatar
- * Club domestic league appearances and goals

Takuya Kawaguchi (川口 卓哉, Kawaguchi Takuya; born October 11, 1978) is a former Japanese football player.

== Club career ==
Kawaguchi was born in Hokkaido on October 11, 1978. After graduating from high school, he joined Bellmare Hiratsuka (later Shonan Bellmare) in 1997. He played often in 1999. He moved to Tokyo Verdy in 2002. However he did not play much and moved to his local club, the Consadole Sapporo in 2003. He retired at the end of the 2003 season.

== National team career ==
In August 1995, Kawaguchi was selected Japan U-17 national team for 1995 U-17 World Championship. He played full time in all 3 matches.

== Career statistics ==
Appearances and goals by club, season and competition
Club	Season	League			Emperor's Cup		J.League Cup		Total	
Club	Season	Division	Apps	Goals	Apps	Goals	Apps	Goals	Apps	Goals
Bellmare Hiratsuka	1997	J1 League	0	0	0	0	0	0	0	0
Bellmare Hiratsuka	1998	J1 League	6	0	0	0	4	0	10	0
Bellmare Hiratsuka	1999	J1 League	24	2	0	0	2	0	26	2
Shonan Bellmare	2000	J2 League	27	1	0	0	2	0	29	1
Shonan Bellmare	2001	J2 League	25	0	0	0	0	0	25	0
Tokyo Verdy	2002	J1 League	8	0	0	0	1	0	9	0
Consadole Sapporo	2003	J2 League	21	0	0	0	—		21	0
Career total			111	3	0	0	9	0	120	3
