= Ryo Sakai =

Japanese footballer

Ryo Sakai 酒井 良
Personal information
- Full name: Ryo Sakai
- Date of birth: August 9, 1977 (age 49)
- Place of birth: Sagamihara, Kanagawa, Japan
- Height: 1.74 m (5 ft 8 1/2 in)
- Position: Midfielder

Youth career
- 1993–1995: Toko Gakuen High School
- 1996–1999: Tokyo University of Agriculture

Senior career*
Years	Team	Apps	(Gls)
2000–2001	Shonan Bellmare	55	(8)
2002	Montedio Yamagata	32	(3)
2003–2004	Okinawa Kariyushi FC		
2004–2005	Thespa Kusatsu	41	(2)
2006–2012	FC Machida Zelvia	121	(25)
Total		249	(38)
- * Club domestic league appearances and goals

Ryo Sakai (酒井 良, Sakai Ryo; born August 9, 1977) is a former Japanese football player.

== Playing career ==
Sakai was born in Sagamihara on August 9, 1977. After graduating from Tokyo University of Agriculture, he joined J2 League club Shonan Bellmare in 2000. He played many matches as forward in first season. However his opportunity to play decreased in 2001. In 2002, he moved to J2 club Montedio Yamagata and played many matches. In 2003, he moved to Regional Leagues club Okinawa Kariyushi FC. In October 2004, he moved to Japan Football League (JFL) club Thespa Kusatsu. The club was promoted to J2 from 2005 and he played many matches as offensive midfielder. In 2006, he moved to Regional Leagues club FC Machida Zelvia. He played as regular player for a long time and the club was promoted to JFL from 2009 and J2 from 2012. However he could hardly play in the match in 2012 and retired end of 2012 season.

== Club statistics ==
Club performance			League		Cup		League Cup		Total	
Season	Club	League	Apps	Goals	Apps	Goals	Apps	Goals	Apps	Goals
Japan			League		Emperor's Cup		J.League Cup		Total	
2000	Shonan Bellmare	J2 League	40	7	3	1	1	0	44	8
2001	Shonan Bellmare	J2 League	15	1	0	0	0	0	15	1
2002	Montedio Yamagata	J2 League	32	3	1	0	-		33	3
2003	Okinawa Kariyushi FC	Regional Leagues								
2004	Okinawa Kariyushi FC	Regional Leagues								
2004	Thespa Kusatsu	Football League	4	0	1	0	-		5	0
2005	Thespa Kusatsu	J2 League	37	2	1	0	-		38	2
2006	FC Machida Zelvia	Regional Leagues	14	11	-		-		14	11
2007	FC Machida Zelvia	Regional Leagues	13	1	-		-		13	1
2008	FC Machida Zelvia	Regional Leagues	14	2	-		-		14	2
2009	FC Machida Zelvia	Football League	30	4	-		-		30	4
2010	FC Machida Zelvia	Football League	22	1	2	0	-		24	1
2011	FC Machida Zelvia	Football League	27	6	1	0	-		28	6
2012	FC Machida Zelvia	J2 League	1	0	0	0	-		1	0
Total			249	38	9	1	1	0	259	39
