= Nobuhiro Sadatomi =

Japanese footballer

Nobuhiro Sadatomi 貞富 信宏
Personal information
- Full name: Nobuhiro Sadatomi
- Date of birth: July 5, 1979 (age 47)
- Place of birth: Tokyo, Japan
- Height: 1.86 m (6 ft 1 in)
- Position: Midfielder

Youth career
- 1995–1997: Teikyo High School

Senior career*
Years	Team	Apps	(Gls)
1998–2001	Shonan Bellmare	16	(0)
2002	Montedio Yamagata	15	(0)
2003–2004	Okinawa Kariyushi FC		
2005	Yokohama FC	18	(0)
2006	Arte Takasaki	33	(2)
2007–2008	AC Nagano Parceiro	24	(9)
Total		106	(11)
- * Club domestic league appearances and goals

Nobuhiro Sadatomi (貞富 信宏, Sadatomi Nobuhiro; born July 5, 1979) is a former Japanese football player.

== Playing career ==
Sadatomi was born in Tokyo on July 5, 1979. After graduating from high school, he joined J1 League club Bellmare Hiratsuka (later Shonan Bellmare) in 1998. Although he played several matches as defensive midfielder every season from 1999, he could not play many matches. In 2002, he moved to J2 League club Montedio Yamagata. In 2003, he moved to Regional Leagues club Okinawa Kariyushi FC and played 2 seasons. In 2005, he moved to Yokohama FC. In 2006, he moved to Arte Takasaki and played as regular player. In 2007, he moved to Regional Leagues club AC Nagano Parceiro. He played as regular player in 2 seasons and retired end of 2008 season.

== Club statistics ==
Club performance			League		Cup		League Cup		Total	
Season	Club	League	Apps	Goals	Apps	Goals	Apps	Goals	Apps	Goals
Japan			League		Emperor's Cup		J.League Cup		Total	
1998	Bellmare Hiratsuka	J1 League	0	0	0	0	0	0	0	0
1999	Bellmare Hiratsuka	J1 League	8	0	1	0	0	0	9	0
2000	Shonan Bellmare	J2 League	5	0	2	0	0	0	7	0
2001	Shonan Bellmare	J2 League	3	0	0	0	0	0	3	0
2002	Montedio Yamagata	J2 League	15	0	0	0	-		15	0
2003	Okinawa Kariyushi FC	Regional Leagues			2	1	-			
2004	Okinawa Kariyushi FC	Regional Leagues			-		-			
2005	Yokohama FC	J2 League	18	0	1	0	-		19	0
2006	Arte Takasaki	Football League	33	2	2	0	-		35	2
2007	AC Nagano Parceiro	Regional Leagues	11	1	-		-		11	1
2008	AC Nagano Parceiro	Regional Leagues	13	8	-		-		13	8
Total			106	11	8	1	0	0	114	12
