= Daisuke Kimori =

Japanese footballer (born 1977)

Daisuke Kimori 樹森 大介
Personal information
- Full name: Daisuke Kimori
- Date of birth: 28 July 1977 (age 49)
- Place of birth: Saitama, Japan
- Height: 1.71 m (5 ft 7 1/2 in)
- Positions: Forward; midfielder

Youth career
- 1993–1995: Maebashi Commercial High School
- 1996–1999: Senshu University

Senior career*
Years	Team	Apps	(Gls)
2000–2002	Shonan Bellmare	39	(1)
2003–2004	Mito HollyHock	76	(5)
2005	Thespa Kusatsu	32	(1)
2006–2008	Tonan Maebashi		
Total		147	(7)

Managerial career
- 2012–2023: Mito HollyHock U18
- 2015–2016: Mito HollyHock (assistant)
- 2023–2025: Mito HollyHock (assistant)
- 2025: Albirex Niigata
- 2025–2026: Tochigi (assistant)
- 2026: Mito HollyHock
- * Club domestic league appearances and goals

Daisuke Kimori (樹森 大介, Kimori Daisuke; born July 28, 1977) is a Japanese professional football manager and former player who was most recently manager of Mito Hollyhock.

== Playing career ==
Kimori was born in Saitama Prefecture on July 28, 1977. After graduating from Senshu University, he joined the J2 League club Shonan Bellmare in 2000. He played in many matches as midfielder during his first season. However he did not play in any games in 2002. In 2003, he moved to the J2 club Mito HollyHock. He became a regular player as an attacking midfielder and played often over two seasons. In 2005, he moved to the newly promoted J2 club, Thespa Kusatsu. He played often as a regular forward. In 2006, he moved to the Prefectural Leagues club Tonan SC Gunma (later Tonan Maebashi). He retired at the end of the 2008 season.

== Managerial career ==
After working as a coach for Mito HollyHock since 2012, Kimori took his first managerial post in December 2024, becoming manager of J1 League club Albirex Niigata. On 23 June 2025, he was sacked.

On 8 December 2025, Kimori was announcement official left from Tochigi SC at end of the 2025 season. Two days later at same month, Kimori was also announce official become manager of J1 League promoted club, Mito HollyHock from 2026 season.

== Career statistics ==
Appearances and goals by club, season and competition
Club	Season	League			Emperor's Cup		J.League Cup		Total	
Club	Season	Division	Apps	Goals	Apps	Goals	Apps	Goals	Apps	Goals
Shonan Bellmare	2000	J2 League	17	0	0	0	0	0	17	0
Shonan Bellmare	2001	J2 League	16	1	2	0	0	0	18	1
Shonan Bellmare	2002	J2 League	6	0	0	0	—		6	0
Mito HollyHock	2003	J2 League	44	4	3	0	—		47	4
Mito HollyHock	2004	J2 League	32	1	1	0	—		33	1
Thespa Kusatsu	2005	J2 League	32	1	2	1	—		34	2
Career total			147	7	8	1	0	0	155	8

== Managerial statistics ==
As of 26 October 2026.

Managerial record by team and tenure
Team	Nat.	From	To	Record								Ref.
Team	Nat.	From	To	G	W	D	L	GF	GA	GD	Win %	Ref.
Albirex Niigata	(Japan)	1 February 2025	22 June 2025	24	7	7	10	30	35	−5	29.17	
Mito HollyHock	(Japan)	1 February 2026	26 October 2026	36	11	3	22	72	89	−17	30.56	
Career Total				60	18	10	32	102	124	−22	30.00	
