= James Angulo =

Colombian footballer (born 1974)

Personal information
- Full name: James Angulo Zamora
- Date of birth: January 20, 1974 (age 52)
- Place of birth: Colombia
- Height: 1.75 m (5 ft 9 in)
- Position: Forward

Senior career*
Years	Team	Apps	(Gls)
2000	Sport Boys		(13)
2001	Shonan Bellmare	12	(2)
- * Club domestic league appearances and goals

James Angulo Zamora (born January 20, 1974) is a former Colombian football player.

== Club statistics ==
Club performance			League		Cup		League Cup		Total	
Season	Club	League	Apps	Goals	Apps	Goals	Apps	Goals	Apps	Goals
Japan			League		Emperor's Cup		J.League Cup		Total	
2001	Shonan Bellmare	J2 League	12	2	0	0	2	0	14	2
Total			12	2	0	0	2	0	14	2
