= 2000 Shonan Bellmare season =

Shonan Bellmare
2000 season
- Manager: Hisashi Kato
- Stadium: Hiratsuka Athletics Stadium
- J.League 2: 8th
- Emperor's Cup: 3rd Round
- J.League Cup: 1st Round
- Top goalscorer: Yoshika Matsubara (12)
Home colours	Away colours

2000 Shonan Bellmare season

== Competitions ==
Competitions	Position
J.League 2	8th / 11 clubs
Emperor's Cup	3rd round
J.League Cup	1st round

== Domestic results ==
=== J.League 2 ===
12 March 2000 1	Shonan Bellmare	4-1	Vegalta Sendai	Hiratsuka Athletics Stadium
JST (UTC+09)

19 March 2000 2	Shonan Bellmare	1-2	Urawa Red Diamonds	Hiratsuka Athletics Stadium
JST (UTC+09)

26 March 2000 3	Oita Trinita	1-2 (GG) (a.e.t.)	Shonan Bellmare	Oita Athletic Stadium
JST (UTC+09)

30 March 2000 4	Shonan Bellmare	5-2	Montedio Yamagata	Hiratsuka Athletics Stadium
JST (UTC+09)

2 April 2000 5	Mito HollyHock	0-1	Shonan Bellmare	Hitachi Athletic Stadium
JST (UTC+09)

6	bye

16 April 2000 7	Shonan Bellmare	0-4	Omiya Ardija	Hiratsuka Athletics Stadium
JST (UTC+09)

23 April 2000 8	Sagan Tosu	2-1	Shonan Bellmare	Tosu Stadium
JST (UTC+09)

30 April 2000 9	Shonan Bellmare	3-0	Ventforet Kofu	Hiratsuka Athletics Stadium
JST (UTC+09)

4 May 2000 10	Consadole Sapporo	2-1 (GG) (a.e.t.)	Shonan Bellmare	Sapporo Atsubetsu Park Stadium
JST (UTC+09)

7 May 2000 11	Shonan Bellmare	1-2 (GG) (a.e.t.)	Albirex Niigata	Hiratsuka Athletics Stadium
JST (UTC+09)

14 May 2000 12	Vegalta Sendai	3-2	Shonan Bellmare	Sendai Stadium
JST (UTC+09)

18 May 2000 13	Urawa Red Diamonds	2-0	Shonan Bellmare	Urawa Komaba Stadium
JST (UTC+09)

21 May 2000 14	Shonan Bellmare	2-1	Oita Trinita	Hiratsuka Athletics Stadium
JST (UTC+09)

27 May 2000 15	Montedio Yamagata	0-1	Shonan Bellmare	Yamagata Park Stadium
JST (UTC+09)

1 June 2000 16	Shonan Bellmare	2-1	Mito HollyHock	Hiratsuka Athletics Stadium
JST (UTC+09)

17	bye

10 June 2000 18	Omiya Ardija	4-1	Shonan Bellmare	Omiya Football Stadium
JST (UTC+09)

17 June 2000 19	Shonan Bellmare	3-1	Sagan Tosu	Hiratsuka Athletics Stadium
JST (UTC+09)

21 June 2000 20	Ventforet Kofu	1-2	Shonan Bellmare	Kose Sports Park Stadium
JST (UTC+09)

25 June 2000 21	Shonan Bellmare	1-2	Consadole Sapporo	Hiratsuka Athletics Stadium
JST (UTC+09)

1 July 2000 22	Albirex Niigata	1-0	Shonan Bellmare	Niigata City Athletic Stadium
JST (UTC+09)

8 July 2000 23	Shonan Bellmare	1-0 (GG) (a.e.t.)	Montedio Yamagata	Hiratsuka Athletics Stadium
JST (UTC+09)

22 July 2000 24	Mito HollyHock	2-1	Shonan Bellmare	Tochigi Green Stadium
JST (UTC+09)

25	bye

2 August 2000 26	Shonan Bellmare	1-2	Omiya Ardija	Hiratsuka Athletics Stadium
JST (UTC+09)

5 August 2000 27	Sagan Tosu	0-1 (GG) (a.e.t.)	Shonan Bellmare	Tosu Stadium
JST (UTC+09)

12 August 2000 28	Shonan Bellmare	4-2	Ventforet Kofu	Hiratsuka Athletics Stadium
JST (UTC+09)

19 August 2000 29	Consadole Sapporo	1-1 (GG) (a.e.t.)	Shonan Bellmare	Sapporo Atsubetsu Park Stadium
JST (UTC+09)

27 August 2000 30	Shonan Bellmare	1-2	Albirex Niigata	Hiratsuka Athletics Stadium
JST (UTC+09)

3 September 2000 31	Vegalta Sendai	2-6	Shonan Bellmare	Sendai Stadium
JST (UTC+09)

9 September 2000 32	Shonan Bellmare	0-2	Urawa Red Diamonds	Hiratsuka Athletics Stadium
JST (UTC+09)

15 September 2000 33	Oita Trinita	5-0	Shonan Bellmare	Suizenji Stadium
JST (UTC+09)

23 September 2000 34	Shonan Bellmare	1-2 (GG) (a.e.t.)	Mito HollyHock	Hiratsuka Athletics Stadium
JST (UTC+09)

35	bye

1 October 2000 36	Omiya Ardija	1-2	Shonan Bellmare	Nishigaoka Soccer Stadium
JST (UTC+09)

8 October 2000 37	Shonan Bellmare	1-2 (GG) (a.e.t.)	Sagan Tosu	Hiratsuka Athletics Stadium
JST (UTC+09)

14 October 2000 38	Ventforet Kofu	2-1	Shonan Bellmare	Kose Sports Park Stadium
JST (UTC+09)

21 October 2000 39	Shonan Bellmare	0-3	Consadole Sapporo	Hiratsuka Athletics Stadium
JST (UTC+09)

28 October 2000 40	Albirex Niigata	3-2 (GG) (a.e.t.)	Shonan Bellmare	Niigata City Athletic Stadium
JST (UTC+09)

5 November 2000 41	Shonan Bellmare	3-4 (GG) (a.e.t.)	Vegalta Sendai	Hiratsuka Athletics Stadium
JST (UTC+09)

12 November 2000 42	Urawa Red Diamonds	1-0 (GG) (a.e.t.)	Shonan Bellmare	Urawa Komaba Stadium
JST (UTC+09)

16 November 2000 43	Shonan Bellmare	0-2	Oita Trinita	Hiratsuka Athletics Stadium
JST (UTC+09)

19 November 2000 44	Montedio Yamagata	1-0	Shonan Bellmare	Yamagata Park Stadium
JST (UTC+09)

=== Emperor's Cup ===
25 November 2000 1st Round	Iwami F.C.	0-4	Shonan Bellmare	Matsue Athletic Stadium
JST (UTC+09)

3 December 2000 2nd Round	Shonan Bellmare	3-0	Kibi International University	Hiratsuka Athletics Stadium
JST (UTC+09)

10 December 2000 3rd Round	Nagoya Grampus Eight	3-2	Shonan Bellmare	Mizuho Athletic Stadium
JST (UTC+09)

=== J.League Cup ===
12 April 2000 1st Round-1	Shonan Bellmare	2-3	Avispa Fukuoka	Hiratsuka Athletics Stadium
JST (UTC+09)

19 April 2000 1st Round-2	Avispa Fukuoka	0-0 (3-2 agg.)	Shonan Bellmare	Hakatanomori Football Stadium
JST (UTC+09)

== Player statistics ==
No.	Pos.	Nat.	Player	D.o.B. (Age)	Height / Weight	J.League 2		Emperor's Cup		J.League Cup		Total	
No.	Pos.	Nat.	Player	D.o.B. (Age)	Height / Weight	Apps	Goals	Apps	Goals	Apps	Goals	Apps	Goals
1	GK	(Japan)	Yuji Ito	May 20, 1965 (aged 34)	cm / kg	22	0						
2	DF	(Japan)	Teruyuki Moniwa	September 8, 1981 (aged 18)	cm / kg	12	0						
3	DF	(Japan)	Takuya Kawaguchi	October 11, 1978 (aged 21)	cm / kg	27	1						
4	DF	(Paraguay)	Daniel Sanabria	February 8, 1977 (aged 23)	cm / kg	15	3						
5	MF	(Japan)	Nobuhiro Sadatomi	July 5, 1979 (aged 20)	cm / kg	5	0						
6	MF	(Japan)	Takafumi Hori	September 10, 1967 (aged 32)	cm / kg	32	3						
7	FW	(Japan)	Yoshinori Abe	September 10, 1972 (aged 27)	cm / kg	14	1						
8	MF	(Paraguay)	Ángel Ortiz	December 27, 1977 (aged 22)	cm / kg	10	0						
8	MF	(Croatia)	Branko Hucika	July 10, 1977 (aged 22)	cm / kg	18	1						
9	FW	(Japan)	Yasunori Takada	February 22, 1979 (aged 21)	cm / kg	25	4						
10	MF	(Japan)	Masakiyo Maezono	October 29, 1973 (aged 26)	cm / kg	38	11						
11	MF	(Japan)	Tomohiro Wanami	April 27, 1980 (aged 19)	cm / kg	35	3						
12	DF	(Japan)	Tetsuya Takada	July 31, 1969 (aged 30)	cm / kg	11	0						
13	MF	(Japan)	Koji Sakamoto	December 3, 1978 (aged 21)	cm / kg	0	0						
14	FW	(Japan)	Tatsuhiro Nishimoto	April 29, 1980 (aged 19)	cm / kg	4	0						
15	DF	(Japan)	Kohei Usui	July 16, 1979 (aged 20)	cm / kg	3	0						
16	GK	(Japan)	Masahito Suzuki	April 28, 1977 (aged 22)	cm / kg	0	0						
17	FW	(Japan)	Yoshika Matsubara	August 19, 1974 (aged 25)	cm / kg	35	12						
18	MF	(Japan)	Tomoyoshi Ono	August 12, 1979 (aged 20)	cm / kg	0	0						
19	MF	(Japan)	Jiro Hiratsuka	December 2, 1979 (aged 20)	cm / kg	5	0						
20	FW	(Japan)	Manabu Komatsubara	April 2, 1981 (aged 18)	cm / kg	20	4						
21	GK	(Japan)	Yuichi Mizutani	May 26, 1980 (aged 19)	cm / kg	19	0						
22	DF	(Japan)	Keita Isozaki	November 17, 1980 (aged 19)	cm / kg	4	0						
23	DF	(Japan)	Yu Tokisaki	June 15, 1979 (aged 20)	cm / kg	17	2						
24	DF	(Japan)	Kentaro Suzuki	June 2, 1980 (aged 19)	cm / kg	1	0						
25	FW	(Japan)	Ryo Sakai	August 9, 1977 (aged 22)	cm / kg	40	7						
26	GK	(Japan)	Ryoji Hiroishi	May 26, 1979 (aged 20)	cm / kg	0	0						
27	MF	(Brazil)	Reinaldo	December 28, 1976 (aged 23)	cm / kg	0	0						
27	FW	(Tajikistan)	Vitaliy Parakhnevych	May 4, 1969 (aged 30)	cm / kg	5	1						
28	MF	(Japan)	Daisuke Kimori	July 28, 1977 (aged 22)	cm / kg	17	0						
29	MF	(Japan)	Kazuhiko Tanabe	June 3, 1981 (aged 18)	cm / kg	12	2						
30	MF	(Japan)	Junichi Watanabe	May 20, 1973 (aged 26)	cm / kg	32	2						
31	DF	(Japan)	Hiroyuki Shirai	June 17, 1974 (aged 25)	cm / kg	21	0						
32	FW	(Japan)	Yuzo Funakoshi	June 12, 1977 (aged 22)	cm / kg	8	0						
33	MF	(Japan)	Koji Nakazato	April 24, 1982 (aged 17)	cm / kg	6	0						
34	DF	(Japan)	Masaki Ogawa	April 3, 1975 (aged 24)	cm / kg	24	0						
35	DF	(Japan)	Kei Sugimoto	June 4, 1982 (aged 17)	cm / kg	3	1						
