= Tatsuhiro Nishimoto =

Japanese footballer

Tatsuhiro Nishimoto 西本 竜洋
Personal information
- Full name: Tatsuhiro Nishimoto
- Date of birth: April 29, 1980 (age 46)
- Place of birth: Iwakuni, Japan
- Height: 1.76 m (5 ft 9 1/2 in)
- Position: Forward

Youth career
- 1996–1998: Iwakuni High School

Senior career*
Years	Team	Apps	(Gls)
1999–2002	Shonan Bellmare	35	(3)
Total		35	(3)
- * Club domestic league appearances and goals

Tatsuhiro Nishimoto (西本 竜洋, Nishimoto Tatsuhiro; born April 29, 1980) is a former Japanese football player.

== Playing career ==
Nishimoto was born in Iwakuni on April 29, 1980. After graduating from high school, he joined J1 League club Bellmare Hiratsuka (later Shonan Bellmare) in 1999. On August 7, he debuted against Nagoya Grampus Eight and scored 2 goals in this match. However the club results were bad and was relegated to J2 League from 2000. His opportunity to play also decreased due to injury from 2000 and he retired end of 2002 season.

== Career statistics ==
Appearances and goals by club, season and competition
Club	Season	League			Emperor's Cup		J.League Cup		Total	
Club	Season	Division	Apps	Goals	Apps	Goals	Apps	Goals	Apps	Goals
Bellmare Hiratsuka	1999	J1 League	14	3	1	0	0	0	15	3
Shonan Bellmare	2000	J2 League	4	0	0	0	0	0	4	0
Shonan Bellmare	2001	J2 League	16	0	0	0	0	0	16	0
Shonan Bellmare	2002	J2 League	1	0	1	0	—		2	0
Career total			35	3	2	0	0	0	37	3
