= Kazunari Ōno =

Japanese footballer

Kazunari Ōno 大野 和成
Personal information
- Full name: Kazunari Ōno
- Date of birth: 4 August 1989 (age 37)
- Place of birth: Jōetsu, Niigata, Japan
- Height: 1.80 m (5 ft 11 in)
- Positions: Centre-back; left-back

Team information
- Current team: Shonan Bellmare
- Number: 8

Youth career
- 1996–2001: FC Takashi
- 2002–2004: Kasuga Junior High School
- 2005–2007: Albirex Niigata

Senior career*
Years	Team	Apps	(Gls)
2008–2017	Albirex Niigata	98	(1)
2011	→ Ehime FC (loan)	17	(0)
2012–2013	→ Shonan Bellmare (loan)	70	(5)
2018–	Shonan Bellmare	180	(4)

International career
2007–2008	Japan U-19	3	(0)
Medal record
Shonan Bellmare
Winner	J.League Cup	2018
- * Club domestic league appearances and goals as of 14 August 2026

Kazunari Ōno (大野 和成, Ōno Kazunari; born 4 August 1989) is a Japanese footballer who plays for J1 League club Shonan Bellmare, as a centre back or left-back.

== Career ==
Ōno was born in Jōetsu, Niigata and began his career playing for his local club Takashi FC before moving to a higher level joining Albirex Niigata in 2005. He turned professional in 2008 season. He made his professional debut on 7 June 2009 against Sanfrecce Hiroshima in the J. League Cup match.

In 2011, Ōno was loaned out to J2 League club Ehime FC to gain first-team experience. He played 17 games for Ehime. Later in the season, Ōno again went on a season-long loan, that time to J2 League side Shonan Bellmare. He scored the first professional goal of his career for Bellmare against FC Gifu on 20 March 2012. After two and half years loan spell, he had come back to Niigata in 2014.

== Club statistics ==
Updated to 16 October 2022.

Club	Season	League		Emperor's Cup		J. League Cup		Total	
Club	Season	Apps	Goals	Apps	Goals	Apps	Goals	Apps	Goals
Albirex Niigata	2008	0	0	0	0	0	0	0	0
Albirex Niigata	2009	0	0	0	0	1	0	1	0
Albirex Niigata	2010	4	0	1	0	0	0	5	0
Albirex Niigata	2011	7	0	0	0	0	0	7	0
Ehime FC	2011	17	0	3	0	–		20	0
Shonan Bellmare	2012	38	2	2	0	–		40	2
Shonan Bellmare	2013	32	3	1	0	3	0	36	3
Albirex Niigata	2014	20	0	2	0	6	0	28	0
Albirex Niigata	2015	25	0	1	0	9	0	35	0
Albirex Niigata	2016	28	1	0	0	5	0	33	1
Albirex Niigata	2017	14	0	0	0	4	0	18	0
Shonan Bellmare	2018	24	1	0	0	11	0	36	1
Shonan Bellmare	2019	23	1	0	0	1	0	24	1
Shonan Bellmare	2020	26	1	–		2	0	28	1
Shonan Bellmare	2021	21	0	2	0	6	0	29	0
Shonan Bellmare	2022	19	0	1	0	4	0	24	0
Career total		298	9	13	0	52	0	363	9
