= Nenê Apeú =

Brazilian footballer (born 1990)

Personal information
- Full name: Helderson Leite Lima
- Date of birth: March 25, 1990 (age 36)
- Place of birth: Brazil
- Height: 1.81 m (5 ft 11 in)
- Position: Forward

Senior career*
Years	Team	Apps	(Gls)
2009	Castanhal		
2009	Shonan Bellmare		
2011	São Raimundo-PA		
2011	Paysandu		
2012	Ypiranga-AP		
2012	Paragominas		
2012	Paysandu		
2013	Tuna Luso		
2013	Castanhal		
2014–2015	Sporting Pombal		
2019	Pedreira		
2020	Paragominas		
2020	Trem		
2020	Tiradentes-PA		
2021	Tocantins de Miracema		
2021	Tocantinópolis		
2021	Independente-AP		
- * Club domestic league appearances and goals

Helderson Leite Lima (born March 25, 1990), better known as Nenê Apeú, is a Brazilian professional footballer who plays as a forward.

== Honours ==
Tocantinópolis

- Campeonato Tocantinense: 2021
