= Tomohiko Miyazaki =

Japanese footballer

Tomohiko Miyazaki 宮崎 智彦
Personal information
- Full name: Tomohiko Miyazaki
- Date of birth: November 21, 1986 (age 39)
- Place of birth: Tokyo, Japan
- Height: 1.71 m (5 ft 7 in)
- Position: Left full back

Team information
- Current team: Fukushima United
- Number: 13

Youth career
- 2002–2004: FC Tokyo

College career
Years	Team	Apps	(Gls)
2005–2008	Ryutsu Keizai University		

Senior career*
Years	Team	Apps	(Gls)
2009–2012	Kashima Antlers	4	(0)
2011	→ Yokohama FC (loan)	28	(1)
2012	→ Júbilo Iwata (loan )	26	(1)
2013–2020	Júbilo Iwata	188	(3)
2021–2022	Fagiano Okayama	40	(0)
2023–	Fukushima United	46	(2)
Medal record
Kashima Antlers
Winner	J1 League	2009
Winner	Emperor's Cup	2010
- * Club domestic league appearances and goals as of 1 January 2026

Tomohiko Miyazaki (宮崎 智彦, Miyazaki Tomohiko; born November 21, 1986 in Tokyo, Japan) is a Japanese football player who currently plays for Fukushima United.

== Career ==
On 23 December 2022, Miyazaki announced that he had officially transferred to the J3 club, Fukushima United, for the upcoming 2023 season.

== Career statistics ==
As of 19 February 2019

Appearances and goals by club, season and competition
Club	Season	League			Emperor's Cup		J.League Cup		Asia		Total	
Club	Season	Division	Apps	Goals	Apps	Goals	Apps	Goals	Apps	Goals	Apps	Goals
Kashima Antlers	2009	J1 League	0	0	0	0	0	0	0	0	0	0
Kashima Antlers	2010	J1 League	4	0	4	0	0	0	0	0	8	0
Yokohama FC	2011	J2 League	28	1	1	0	—		—		29	1
Júbilo Iwata	2012	J1 League	26	1	1	0	4	0	—		31	1
Júbilo Iwata	2013	J1 League	23	0	1	0	2	0	—		26	0
Júbilo Iwata	2014	J2 League	25	1	3	1	—		—		28	2
Júbilo Iwata	2015	J2 League	40	2	0	0	—		—		40	2
Júbilo Iwata	2016	J1 League	32	0	0	0	1	0	—		33	0
Júbilo Iwata	2017	J1 League	29	0	0	0	2	0	—		31	0
Júbilo Iwata	2018	J1 League	15	0	3	0	3	0	—		21	0
Career total			222	5	13	1	12	0	0	0	247	6
