= Yuzo Iwakami =

Japanese footballer

Yuzo Iwakami 岩上 祐三
Personal information
- Full name: Yuzo Iwakami
- Date of birth: July 28, 1989 (age 37)
- Place of birth: Koga, Ibaraki, Japan
- Height: 1.70 m (5 ft 7 in)
- Positions: Midfielder; defender

Team information
- Current team: South Melbourne
- Number: 15

Youth career
- 2005–2007: Maebashi Shogyo High School

College career
| Years | Team | Apps | (Gls) |
| 2008–2011 | Tokai University | | |

Senior career*
| Years | Team | Apps | (Gls) |
| 2011–2013 | Shonan Bellmare | 31 | (6) |
| 2013 | → Matsumoto Yamaga (loan) | 13 | (2) |
| 2014–2015 | Matsumoto Yamaga | 74 | (12) |
| 2016–2017 | Omiya Ardija | 46 | (1) |
| 2018–2019 | Matsumoto Yamaga | 57 | (6) |
| 2020–2024 | Thespakusatsu Gunma | 117 | (6) |
| 2023 | → SC Sagamihara (loan) | 16 | (0) |
| 2024 | SC Sagamihara | 34 | (1) |
| 2025– | South Melbourne | 0 | (0) |
- * Club domestic league appearances and goals as of 15 August 2024 @ 17:52(AEST)

Yuzo Iwakami (岩上 祐三, born July 28, 1989) is a Japanese professional football player who plays as a midfielder or defender for NPL Victoria side South Melbourne FC.

Iwakami holds the record for fastest goal scored in the entire J League system. He has over 350 career appearances, appearing mainly in the J1 League and J2 League.

== Career ==
Born in the Ibaraki Prefecture, after graduating from Tokai University, Iwakami joined Shonan Bellmare as a specially-designated player for the 2011 season. On 30 September 2012, he officially joined Shonan Bellmare's first team from the 2012 season.

On 12 January 2014, Iwakami was announced at Matsumoto Yamaga on a permanent transfer. On 23 March 2014, he scored the fastest goal in J League history, scoring after 7 seconds against Kamatamare Sanuki, breaking the previous record of eight seconds by Hisato Satō. On 6 January 2015, Iwakami renewed his contract for the 2015 season after playing 41 league matches and scoring 8 goals during the 2014 season, where Matsumoto Yamaga were promoted to the J1 League.

On 25 December 2015, Iwakami was announced at Omiya Ardija on a permanent transfer.

On 8 January 2018, Iwakami was announced at Matsumoto Yamaga on a permanent transfer.

On 9 January 2022, Iwakami extended his contract with Thespa Gunma for the 2022 season, after playing 37 games during the 2021 season.

On 19 July 2023, Iwakami was announced at SC Sagamihara on a one year loan deal.

On 7 January 2024, Iwakami was announced at SC Sagamihara on a permanent transfer. On 27 November 2024, the club announced he would not be extending his contract for the 2025 season.

== Style of play ==
Iwakami has been utilized as a right wing-back.

== Career statistics ==
Updated to 24 February 2019.

Appearances and goals by club, season and competition
| Club | Season | League | | | Emperor's Cup | | J.League Cup | | Total | |
| Club | Season | Division | Apps | Goals | Apps | Goals | Apps | Goals | Apps | Goals |
|---|---|---|---|---|---|---|---|---|---|---|
| Tokai University | 2009 | - | - | | 2 | 0 | - | | 2 | 0 |
| Shonan Bellmare | 2011 | J2 League | 1 | 0 | 0 | 0 | - | | 1 | 0 |
| Shonan Bellmare | 2012 | J2 League | 21 | 5 | 2 | 0 | - | | 23 | 5 |
| Shonan Bellmare | 2013 | J1 League | 9 | 1 | - | | 4 | 0 | 13 | 1 |
| Matsumoto Yamaga | 2013 | J2 League | 13 | 2 | 2 | 0 | - | | 15 | 2 |
| Matsumoto Yamaga | 2014 | J2 League | 41 | 8 | 1 | 0 | - | | 42 | 8 |
| Matsumoto Yamaga | 2015 | J1 League | 33 | 4 | 2 | 0 | 1 | 0 | 36 | 4 |
| Omiya Ardija | 2016 | J1 League | 20 | 1 | 2 | 0 | 5 | 0 | 27 | 1 |
| Omiya Ardija | 2017 | J1 League | 26 | 0 | 3 | 0 | 4 | 2 | 33 | 2 |
| Matsumoto Yamaga | 2018 | J2 League | 38 | 5 | 0 | 0 | - | | 38 | 5 |
| Career total | | | 202 | 26 | 14 | 0 | 14 | 2 | 231 | 28 |
