= Isamu Matsuura =

Japanese footballer

Personal information
- Full name: Isamu Matsuura
- Date of birth: August 12, 1991 (age 35)
- Place of birth: Shizuoka, Japan
- Height: 1.81 m (5 ft 11 in)
- Position: Midfielder

Senior career*
Years	Team	Apps	(Gls)
2010–2011	Shonan Bellmare	1	(0)
2012–2013	FC Ryukyu	19	(1)
Total		20	(1)
- * Club domestic league appearances and goals

Isamu Matsuura (松浦 勇武, Matsuura Isamu; born August 12, 1991) is a former Japanese football player.
