= Tomi Shimomura =

Japanese footballer

Tomi Shimomura 下村 東美
Personal information
- Full name: Tomi Shimomura
- Date of birth: December 18, 1980 (age 45)
- Place of birth: Sapporo, Hokkaido, Japan
- Height: 1.81 m (5 ft 11 1/2 in)
- Position: Midfielder

Youth career
- 1996–1998: Sapporo Daiichi High School
- 1999–2002: Osaka University of Health and Sport Sciences

Senior career*
Years	Team	Apps	(Gls)
2003–2006	Cerezo Osaka	73	(3)
2007–2009	JEF United Chiba	84	(1)
2010–2011	Montedio Yamagata	45	(1)
2012–2013	Shonan Bellmare	25	(1)
2014	Giravanz Kitakyushu	12	(0)
Total		239	(6)
Medal record
Cerezo Osaka
Runner-up	Emperor's Cup	2003
- * Club domestic league appearances and goals

Tomi Shimomura (下村 東美, Shimomura Tomi; born December 18, 1980) is a former Japanese football player.

== Career statistics ==
Appearances and goals by club, season and competition
Club	Season	League			Emperor's Cup		J.League Cup		Total	
Club	Season	Division	Apps	Goals	Apps	Goals	Apps	Goals	Apps	Goals
Cerezo Osaka	2003	J1 League	0	0	0	0	0	0	0	0
Cerezo Osaka	2004	J1 League	24	1	1	0	5	1	30	2
Cerezo Osaka	2005	J1 League	26	1	3	0	7	0	36	1
Cerezo Osaka	2006	J1 League	23	1	1	0	7	0	31	1
JEF United Chiba	2007	J1 League	26	0	1	0	4	0	31	0
JEF United Chiba	2008	J1 League	33	0	0	0	8	0	41	0
JEF United Chiba	2009	J1 League	25	1	3	0	5	1	33	2
Montedio Yamagata	2010	J1 League	25	1	3	0	5	0	33	1
Montedio Yamagata	2011	J1 League	20	0	1	1	1	0	22	1
Shonan Bellmare	2012	J2 League	17	1	2	0	—		19	1
Shonan Bellmare	2013	J1 League	8	0	1	0	2	0	11	0
Giravanz Kitakyushu	2014	J2 League	12	0	1	0	—		13	0
Career total			239	6	18	1	44	2	303	9
