= Tetsuya Kanno =

Japanese footballer

Tetsuya Kanno 菅野哲也
Personal information
- Full name: Tetsuya Kanno
- Date of birth: August 30, 1989 (age 37)
- Place of birth: Ichikawa, Chiba, Japan
- Height: 1.72 m (5 ft 7 1/2 in)
- Position: Midfielder

Team information
- Current team: Veertien Mie
- Number: 7

Youth career
- 2005–2007: Seiritsu Gakuen High School

Senior career*
Years	Team	Apps	(Gls)
2008–2011	Shonan Bellmare	0	(0)
2009	→ Shonan Bellmare futsal (loan)	1	(0)
2010–2011	→ Zweigen Kanazawa (loan)	66	(6)
2012–2014	SC Sagamihara	77	(17)
2015–2017	Nagano Parceiro	51	(4)
2018–2021	Nara Club	74	(8)
2021-	Veertien Mie	86	(11)
Total		355	(46)
- * Club domestic league appearances and goals as of 27 January 2024 @ 11:49(AEST)

Tetsuya Kanno (菅野哲也, Kanno Tetsuya; born August 30, 1989) is a Japanese football player.

== Career statistics ==
Updated to 18 November 2018.

Appearances and goals by club, season and competition
Club	Season	League			Emperor's Cup		Total	
Club	Season	Division	Apps	Goals	Apps	Goals	Apps	Goals
Shonan Bellmare	2008	J2 League	0	0	0	0	0	0
Shonan Bellmare	2009	J2 League	0	0	0	0	0	0
Zweigen Kanazawa	2010	JFL	25	1	2	0	27	1
Zweigen Kanazawa	2011	JFL	31	5	2	0	33	5
SC Sagamihara	2012	JRL (Kanto)	15	3	–		15	3
SC Sagamihara	2013	JFL	29	8	–		29	8
SC Sagamihara	2014	J3 League	33	6	–		33	6
Nagano Parceiro	2015	J3 League	17	2	1	0	18	2
Nagano Parceiro	2016	J3 League	25	2	1	0	26	2
Nagano Parceiro	2017	J3 League	9	0	3	0	12	0
Nara Club	2018	JFL	27	1	2	0	29	0
Nara Club	2019	JFL						
Career total			211	28	11	0	222	28
