= Kim Yeong-gi =

Zainichi Korean footballer (born 1985)

Personal information
- Full name: Kim Yeong-gi
- Date of birth: 24 January 1985 (age 41)
- Place of birth: Himeji, Hyōgo, Japan
- Height: 1.90 m (6 ft 3 in)
- Position: Goalkeeper

Youth career
- 2003–2006: Momoyama Gakuin University

Senior career*
Years	Team	Apps	(Gls)
2007–2012	Shonan Bellmare	94	(0)
2013	Oita Trinita	0	(0)
2013	→ Avispa Fukuoka (loan)	0	(0)
2014–2016	Nagano Parceiro	1	(0)
- * Club domestic league appearances and goals as of 23 February 2017

Kim Yeong-gi

Japanese name
- Kana: キム・ヨンギ
Transcriptions
- Romanization: Kimu Yongi

Korean name
- Hangul: 김영기
- Hanja: 金永基
Transcriptions
- Revised Romanization: Gim Yeonggi
- McCune–Reischauer: Kim Yŏnggi

Kim Yeong-gi (Korean: 김영기; born 24 January 1985 in Himeji, Hyōgo, Japan) is a South Korean footballer.

== Career statistics ==
Updated to 23 February 2017.

Club performance			League		Cup		League Cup		Total	
Season	Club	League	Apps	Goals	Apps	Goals	Apps	Goals	Apps	Goals
Japan			League		Emperor's Cup		J. League Cup		Total	
2007	Shonan Bellmare	J2 League	48	0	2	0	-		50	0
2008	Shonan Bellmare	J2 League	42	0	1	0	-		43	0
2009	Shonan Bellmare	J2 League	0	0	0	0	-		0	0
2010	Shonan Bellmare	J1 League	0	0	0	0	3	0	0	0
2011	Shonan Bellmare	J2 League	0	0	0	0	-		0	0
2012	Shonan Bellmare	J2 League	4	0	0	0	-		4	0
2013	Oita Trinita	J1 League	0	0	-		0	0	0	0
2013	Avispa Fukuoka	J2 League	0	0	0	0	-		0	0
2014	Nagano Parceiro	J3 League	0	0	0	0	-		0	0
2015	Nagano Parceiro	J3 League	1	0	0	0	-		1	0
2016	Nagano Parceiro	J3 League	0	0	0	0	-		0	0
Total			95	0	3	0	3	0	101	0
