= Akihiro Sakata =

Japanese footballer

Akihiro Sakata 阪田 章裕
Personal information
- Full name: Akihiro Sakata
- Date of birth: 16 May 1984 (age 42)
- Place of birth: Kyoto, Japan
- Height: 1.78 m (5 ft 10 in)
- Position: Defender

Team information
- Current team: Fukushima United FC
- Number: 3

Youth career
- 2003–2006: Ritsumeikan University

Senior career*
Years	Team	Apps	(Gls)
2007–2008	Cerezo Osaka	5	(0)
2009–2010	Shonan Bellmare	15	(0)
2011–2015	Oita Trinita	122	(8)
2016–2017	Nagano Parceiro	40	(2)
2018–	Fukushima United FC		
- * Club domestic league appearances and goals as of 23 February 2018

Akihiro Sakata (阪田 章裕, Sakata Akihiro; born 16 May 1984 in Kyoto, Kyoto) is a Japanese footballer who plays for Fukushima United FC in J3 League.

== Career statistics ==
Updated to 23 February 2018.

Appearances and goals by club, season and competition
Club	Season	League			Emperor's Cup		J.League Cup		Total	
Club	Season	Division	Apps	Goals	Apps	Goals	Apps	Goals	Apps	Goals
Cerezo Osaka	2007	J2 League	4	0	0	0	-		4	0
Cerezo Osaka	2008	J2 League	1	0	0	0	-		1	0
Shonan Bellmare	2009	J2 League	6	0	1	0	-		7	0
Shonan Bellmare	2010	J1 League	9	0	0	0	3	0	12	0
Oita Trinita	2011	J2 League	20	0	0	0	–		20	0
Oita Trinita	2012	J2 League	40	4	1	0	–		41	4
Oita Trinita	2013	J1 League	23	2	3	0	1	0	27	2
Oita Trinita	2014	J2 League	28	1	2	0	–		30	1
Oita Trinita	2015	J2 League	11	1	2	0	–		13	1
Nagano Parceiro	2016	J3 League	30	2	3	0	–		33	2
Nagano Parceiro	2017	J3 League	10	0	2	0	–		12	0
Career total			182	10	14	0	4	0	200	10
