= Kei Uemura =

Japanese footballer

Kei Uemura 植村 慶
Personal information
- Full name: Kei Uemura
- Date of birth: September 24, 1981 (age 45)
- Place of birth: Yokohama, Japan
- Height: 1.81 m (5 ft 11 1/2 in)
- Position: Goalkeeper

Youth career
- 1997–1999: Toko Gakuen High School
- 2000–2003: Chuo University

Senior career*
Years	Team	Apps	(Gls)
2004–2010	Shonan Bellmare	17	(0)
2011–2013	Júbilo Iwata	0	(0)
2014–2016	Fukushima United FC	70	(0)
Total		87	(0)
- * Club domestic league appearances and goals

Kei Uemura (植村 慶, Uemura Kei; born September 24, 1981) is a former Japanese football player.

== Club statistics ==
Club performance			League		Cup		League Cup		Total	
Season	Club	League	Apps	Goals	Apps	Goals	Apps	Goals	Apps	Goals
Japan			League		Emperor's Cup		J.League Cup		Total	
2004	Shonan Bellmare	J2 League	6	0	0	0	-		6	0
2005	Shonan Bellmare	J2 League	2	0	0	0	-		2	0
2006	Shonan Bellmare	J2 League	9	0	2	0	-		11	0
2007	Shonan Bellmare	J2 League	0	0	0	0	-		0	0
2008	Shonan Bellmare	J2 League	0	0	0	0	-		0	0
2009	Shonan Bellmare	J2 League	0	0	1	0	-		1	0
2010	Shonan Bellmare	J1 League	0	0	0	0	1	0	1	0
2011	Jubilo Iwata	J1 League	0	0	0	0	0	0	0	0
2012	Jubilo Iwata	J1 League	0	0	1	0	0	0	1	0
2013	Jubilo Iwata	J1 League	0	0	0	0	0	0	0	0
2014	Fukushima; United FC	J3 League	20	0	0	0	-		20	0
2015	Fukushima; United FC	J3 League	27	0	0	0	-		27	0
2016	Fukushima; United FC	J3 League	23	0	0	0	-		23	0
Career total			87	0	4	0	1	0	92	0
