= Nobutaka Suzuki =

Japanese footballer

Personal information
- Full name: Nobutaka Suzuki
- Date of birth: September 12, 1983 (age 43)
- Place of birth: Ageo, Saitama, Japan
- Height: 1.69 m (5 ft 6 1/2 in)
- Position: Defender

Youth career
- 1999–2001: Omiya Higashi High School

Senior career*
Years	Team	Apps	(Gls)
2002–2005	Saarbrücken	7	(0)
2005–2006	Eintracht Trier	29	(0)
2007–2010	Shonan Bellmare	59	(1)
2011–2012	Gainare Tottori	8	(0)
2013	FC Kagoshima	7	(0)
2014	Samut Songkhram	0	(0)
2014	Phitsanulok		
Total		110	(1)
- * Club domestic league appearances and goals

Nobutaka Suzuki (鈴木 伸貴, Suzuki Nobutaka; born September 12, 1983) is a former Japanese football player.

== Club statistics ==
Club performance			League		Cup		League Cup		Total	
Season	Club	League	Apps	Goals	Apps	Goals	Apps	Goals	Apps	Goals
Germany			League		DFB-Pokal		Other		Total	
2002–03	Saarbrücken	Regionalliga Süd	6	0	0	0	-		6	0
2003–04	Saarbrücken	Regionalliga Süd	1	0	-		-		1	0
2004-05	1. FC Saarbrücken II	Oberliga Südwest	29	1	-		-		29	1
2005–06	Eintracht Trier	Regionalliga Süd	29	0	0	0	-		29	0
Japan			League		Emperor's Cup		League Cup		Total	
2007	Shonan Bellmare	J2 League	9	0	1	0	-		10	0
2008	Shonan Bellmare	J2 League	33	1	0	0	-		33	1
2009	Shonan Bellmare	J2 League	12	0	0	0	-		12	0
2010	Shonan Bellmare	J1 League								
Total	Germany		65	1	0	0	0	0	65	1
Total	Japan		54	1	1	0	0	0	55	1
Career total			119	2						
