= Tatsuki Kobayashi =

Japanese footballer (born 1985)

Tatsuki Kobayashi 小林 竜樹
Personal information
- Full name: Tatsuki Kobayashi
- Date of birth: May 5, 1985 (age 41)
- Place of birth: Sano, Tochigi, Japan
- Height: 1.62 m (5 ft 4 in)
- Position: Midfielder

Youth career
- 2001–2003: Maebashi Ikuei High School
- 2004–2007: Komazawa University

Senior career*
Years	Team	Apps	(Gls)
2008–2010	Shonan Bellmare	1	(0)
2009	→ Thespa Kusatsu (loan)	10	(5)
2011–2018	Thespakusatsu Gunma	228	(19)
- * Club domestic league appearances and goals as of 23 February 2019

Tatsuki Kobayashi (小林 竜樹, Kobayashi Tatsuki; born May 5, 1985) is a Japanese football player currently playing for Thespakusatsu Gunma.

== Career statistics ==
Updated to 23 February 2019.

Appearances and goals by club, season and competition
Club	Season	League			Emperor's Cup		J.League Cup		Total	
Club	Season	Division	Apps	Goals	Apps	Goals	Apps	Goals	Apps	Goals
Shonan Bellmare	2008	J2 League	0	0	0	0	-		0	0
Shonan Bellmare	2009	J2 League	0	0	-		-		0	0
Thespa Kusatsu	2009	J2 League	10	5	1	0	-		11	5
Shonan Bellmare	2010	J1 League	1	0	0	0	2	0	3	0
Thespakusatsu Gunma	2011	J2 League	17	3	0	0	-		17	3
Thespakusatsu Gunma	2012	J2 League	36	4	1	0	-		37	4
Thespakusatsu Gunma	2013	J2 League	34	2	1	0	-		35	2
Thespakusatsu Gunma	2014	J2 League	39	2	3	0	-		42	2
Thespakusatsu Gunma	2015	J2 League	28	3	0	0	-		28	3
Thespakusatsu Gunma	2016	J2 League	34	3	1	0	-		35	3
Thespakusatsu Gunma	2017	J2 League	25	0	1	0	-		26	0
Thespakusatsu Gunma	2018	J3 League	25	2	0	0	-		25	2
Career total			239	24	8	0	2	0	249	24
