= Kenji Baba =

Japanese footballer (born 1985)

Kenji Baba 馬場 賢治
Personal information
- Full name: Kenji Baba
- Date of birth: July 7, 1985 (age 41)
- Place of birth: Hiratsuka, Kanagawa, Japan
- Height: 1.77 m (5 ft 10 in)
- Positions: Forward; left winger

Youth career
- 2001–2003: Toko Gakuen High School
- 2004–2007: Kindai University

Senior career*
Years	Team	Apps	(Gls)
2008–2011	Vissel Kobe	30	(1)
2010	→ Shonan Bellmare (loan)	16	(1)
2012–2013	Shonan Bellmare	35	(10)
2014–2015	Mito HollyHock	70	(16)
2016–2017	Kamatamare Sanuki	81	(10)
2018–2019	Oita Trinita	33	(12)
2019	→ Gifu (loan)	19	(0)
2020	Kagoshima United	30	(6)
- * Club domestic league appearances and goals

Kenji Baba (馬場 賢治, Baba Kenji; born July 7, 1985) is a Japanese former footballer.

== Career statistics ==
Updated to 25 February 2019.

Appearances and goals by club, season and competition
Club	Season	League			Emperor's Cup		J.League Cup		Total	
Club	Season	Division	Apps	Goals	Apps	Goals	Apps	Goals	Apps	Goals
Vissel Kobe	2008	J1 League	16	0	0	0	4	1	20	1
Vissel Kobe	2009	J1 League	13	1	1	0	5	0	19	1
Shonan Bellmare	2010	J1 League	16	1	1	0	3	0	20	1
Vissel Kobe	2011	J1 League	1	0	1	0	0	0	2	0
Shonan Bellmare	2012	J2 League	28	9	1	0	—		29	9
Shonan Bellmare	2013	J1 League	7	1	0	0	3	0	10	1
Mito HollyHock	2014	J2 League	30	7	1	0	—		31	7
Mito HollyHock	2015	J2 League	40	9	3	0	—		43	9
Kamatamare Sanuki	2016	J2 League	42	5	1	0	—		43	5
Kamatamare Sanuki	2017	J2 League	39	5	0	0	—		39	5
Oita Trinita	2019	J2 League	31	12	0	0	—		31	12
Career total			259	50	9	0	15	1	277	51
