= Ryota Nagata =

Japanese footballer

Ryota Nagata 永田 亮太
Personal information
- Full name: Ryota Nagata
- Date of birth: May 17, 1985 (age 41)
- Place of birth: Kyoto, Japan
- Height: 1.80 m (5 ft 11 in)
- Position: Midfielder

Team information
- Current team: Kamatamare Sanuki
- Number: 7

Youth career
- 1997–2003: Kyoto Purple Sanga Youth
- 2004–2007: Ritsumeikan University

Senior career*
Years	Team	Apps	(Gls)
2008–2010	Shonan Bellmare	83	(1)
2011	Sagan Tosu	14	(0)
2012	Montedio Yamagata	20	(2)
2013–2014	Thespakusatsu Gunma	56	(4)
2015–	Kamatamare Sanuki	114	(13)
- * Club domestic league appearances and goals as of 23 February 2018

Ryota Nagata (永田 亮太, Nagata Ryota; born May 17, 1985) is a Japanese football player currently playing for Kamatamare Sanuki.

== Club statistics ==
Updated to 23 February 2018.

Club performance			League		Cup		League Cup		Total	
Season	Club	League	Apps	Goals	Apps	Goals	Apps	Goals	Apps	Goals
Japan			League		Emperor's Cup		League Cup		Total	
2008	Shonan Bellmare	J2 League	33	0	1	0	-		34	0
2009	Shonan Bellmare	J2 League	42	1	1	0	-		43	1
2010	Shonan Bellmare	J1 League	8	0	0	0	5	0	13	0
2011	Sagan Tosu	J2 League	4	0	0	0	-		14	0
2012	Montedio Yamagata	J2 League	20	2	0	0	-		20	2
2013	Thespakusatsu Gunma	J2 League	24	2	0	0	-		24	2
2014	Thespakusatsu Gunma	J2 League	32	2	0	0	-		32	2
2015	Kamatamare Sanuki	J2 League	15	6	1	0	-		36	6
2016	Kamatamare Sanuki	J2 League	37	4	2	0	-		39	4
2017	Kamatamare Sanuki	J2 League	42	3	1	0	-		43	3
Career total			287	20	6	0	5	0	298	20
