= Shota Kobayashi =

Japanese footballer

Shota Kobayashi 古林 将太
Personal information
- Full name: Shota Kobayashi
- Date of birth: 11 May 1991 (age 35)
- Place of birth: Minamiashigara, Kanagawa, Japan
- Height: 1.73 m (5 ft 8 in)
- Position: Winger

Youth career
- 2001–2009: Shonan Bellmare Youth

Senior career*
Years	Team	Apps	(Gls)
2009–2015	Shonan Bellmare	103	(6)
2011	→ Thespa Kusatsu (loan)	35	(1)
2016–2017	Nagoya Grampus	29	(1)
2017	→ Vegalta Sendai (loan)	16	(0)
2018	Vegalta Sendai	10	(0)
2019–2022	Shonan Bellmare	80	(2)
2023	Fukushima United	21	(2)
Medal record
Vegalta Sendai
Runner-up	Emperor's Cup	2018
- * Club domestic league appearances and goals as of 17:47, 30 August 2023 (UTC) ‡ National team caps and goals as of 8 January 2018

Shota Kobayashi (古林 将太, Kobayashi Shōta; born 11 May 1991) is a Japanese footballer who currently plays for Fukushima United.

== Career ==
=== Club ===
On 23 July 2017, Nagoya Grampus announced that Kobayashi had joined Vegalta Sendai on loan until 31 January 2018.

On 28 December 2022, Shonan Bellmare announced that Kobayashi had joined the J3 club, Fukushima United for the upcoming 2023 season.

== Career statistics ==
=== Club ===
As of the end of 2022 season.

Appearances and goals by club, season and competition
Club	Season	League			National Cup		League Cup		Continental		Total	
Club	Season	Division	Apps	Goals	Apps	Goals	Apps	Goals	Apps	Goals	Apps	Goals
Shonan Bellmare	2009	J2 League	0	0	1	0	–		–		1	0
Shonan Bellmare	2010	J1 League	7	0	0	0	3	0	–		10	0
Thespa Kusatsu	2011	J2 League	35	1	1	0	–		–		36	1
Shonan Bellmare	2012	J2 League	38	3	1	0	–		–		39	3
Shonan Bellmare	2013	J1 League	30	0	2	0	2	1	–		34	1
Shonan Bellmare	2014	J2 League	2	0	0	0	–		–		2	0
Shonan Bellmare	2015	J1 League	26	3	0	0	5	1	–		31	4
Nagoya Grampus	2016	J1 League	28	1	1	0	5	0	–		34	1
Nagoya Grampus	2017	J2 League	1	0	2	0	–		–		3	0
Vegalta Sendai	2017	J1 League	16	0	0	0	3	0	–		19	0
Vegalta Sendai	2018	J1 League	10	0	4	0	4	0	–		18	0
Shonan Bellmare	2019	J1 League	23	1	1	0	6	0	–		30	1
Shonan Bellmare	2020	J1 League	24	0	0	0	1	0	–		25	0
Shonan Bellmare	2021	J1 League	27	1	1	0	6	1	–		34	2
Shonan Bellmare	2022	J1 League	6	0	2	0	5	0	–		13	0
Fukushima United	2023	J3 League	0	0	0	0	–		–		0	0
Career total			273	10	18	0	40	3	-	-	331	13
