= Taisuke Muramatsu =

Japanese footballer (born 1989)

Taisuke Muramatsu 村松大輔
Personal information
- Full name: Taisuke Muramatsu
- Date of birth: 16 December 1989 (age 36)
- Place of birth: Yaizu, Shizuoka, Japan
- Height: 1.76 m (5 ft 9 1/2 in)
- Position: Defender

Youth career
- 2005–2007: Fujieda Higashi High School

Senior career*
Years	Team	Apps	(Gls)
2008	Honda FC	7	(0)
2009–2010	Shonan Bellmare	80	(0)
2011–2017	Shimizu S-Pulse	96	(7)
2014	→ Tokushima Vortis (loan)	15	(0)
2016	→ Vissel Kobe (loan)	5	(0)
2018	Giravanz Kitakyushu	26	(1)

International career
2008	Japan U-20	4	(0)
2012	Japan U-23	1	(0)
Medal record
Shimizu S-Pulse
Runner-up	J.League Cup	2012
- * Club domestic league appearances and goals as of 3 December 2018

Taisuke Muramatsu (村松 大輔, Muramatsu Taisuke; born 16 December 1989 in Yaizu, Shizuoka) is a Japanese footballer who plays for Giravanz Kitakyushu.

== Club career ==
After several clubs for which he played for, Muramatsu retired in February 2019 after one season with Giravanz Kitakyushu.

== National team career ==
In July 2012, he was elected Japan U-23 national team for 2012 Summer Olympics. At this tournament, he played 1 match as right side back against Honduras and Japan won the 4th place.

== Career statistics ==
Updated to 23 February 2019.

Appearances and goals by club, season and competition
Club	Season	League		Cup^{1}		League Cup^{2}		Total	
Club	Season	Apps	Goals	Apps	Goals	Apps	Goals	Apps	Goals
Honda FC	2008	7	0	2	0	—		9	0
Shonan Bellmare	2009	50	0	1	0	—		51	0
Shonan Bellmare	2010	30	0	2	0	5	0	37	0
Shimizu S-Pulse	2011	19	0	1	0	4	0	24	0
Shimizu S-Pulse	2012	29	3	2	0	7	0	38	3
Shimizu S-Pulse	2013	33	4	2	0	6	0	41	4
Shimizu S-Pulse	2014	7	0	—		1	0	8	0
Tokushima Vortis	2014	15	0	0	0	—		15	0
Shimizu S-Pulse	2015	3	0	1	0	1	0	5	0
Vissel Kobe	2016	5	0	1	0	3	0	9	0
Shimizu S-Pulse	2017	5	0	3	0	4	1	12	1
Giravanz Kitakyushu	2018	26	1	0	0	—		26	1
Career total		229	8	15	0	31	1	275	9

^{1}Includes Emperor's Cup.

^{2}Includes J. League Cup.

== National team statistics ==
=== Appearances in major competitions ===
Team	Competition	Category	Appearances		Goals	Team record
Team	Competition	Category	Start	Sub	Goals	Team record
Japan	AFC U-19 Championship 2008	U-19	4	0	0	Quarterfinal
