= Tsuyoshi Shimamura =

Japanese footballer

Tsuyoshi Shimamura 島村 毅
Personal information
- Full name: Tsuyoshi Shimamura
- Date of birth: 10 August 1985 (age 41)
- Place of birth: Koshigaya, Saitama, Japan
- Height: 1.83 m (6 ft 0 in)
- Position: Full-back

Youth career
- 2004–2007: Waseda University

Senior career*
Years	Team	Apps	(Gls)
2008–2018	Shonan Bellmare	175	(14)
2011	→ Tokushima Vortis (loan)	25	(5)
Medal record
Shonan Bellmare
Winner	J.League Cup	2018
- * Club domestic league appearances and goals as of 17 December 2018

Tsuyoshi Shimamura (島村 毅, Shimamura Tsuyoshi; born 10 August 1985) is a former Japanese footballer.

== Career ==
After a long career with Shonan Bellmare, he announced his retirement in December 2018.

== Career statistics ==
Updated to 23 February 2019.

Appearances and goals by club, season and competition
Club	Season	League			Emperor's Cup		J.League Cup		Total	
Club	Season	Division	Apps	Goals	Apps	Goals	Apps	Goals	Apps	Goals
Shonan Bellmare	2008	J2 League	0	0	0	0	-		0	0
Shonan Bellmare	2009	J2 League	21	0	1	0	-		22	0
Shonan Bellmare	2010	J1 League	24	1	2	1	2	0	28	2
Tokushima Vortis	2011	J2 League	25	5	0	0	-		25	5
Shonan Bellmare	2012	J2 League	32	3	2	0	-		35	3
Shonan Bellmare	2013	J1 League	27	2	1	0	3	0	31	2
Shonan Bellmare	2014	J2 League	20	2	1	0	-		21	2
Shonan Bellmare	2015	J1 League	13	3	2	0	3	0	18	3
Shonan Bellmare	2016	J1 League	19	0	3	0	1	1	23	1
Shonan Bellmare	2017	J2 League	18	3	1	0	-		19	3
Shonan Bellmare	2018	J1 League	1	0	2	0	3	0	6	0
Career total			200	19	15	1	12	1	227	21
