= Yuya Nakamura (footballer, born 1986) =

Japanese footballer

Yuya Nakamura 中村 祐也
Personal information
- Full name: Yuya Nakamura
- Date of birth: April 14, 1986 (age 40)
- Place of birth: Fujimino, Saitama, Japan
- Height: 1.68 m (5 ft 6 in)
- Position: Forward

Team information
- Current team: Aventura Kawaguchi

Youth career
- 2002–2004: Urawa Reds

Senior career*
Years	Team	Apps	(Gls)
2005–2007	Urawa Reds	0	(0)
2008–2014	Shonan Bellmare	102	(23)
2015–2018	Machida Zelvia	64	(13)
2019	Tochigi City		
2020–	Aventura Kawaguchi		
Total		166	(36)
Medal record
Urawa Reds
Winner	AFC Champions League	2007
Winner	J1 League	2006
Runner-up	J1 League	2005
Runner-up	J1 League	2007
Winner	Emperor's Cup	2005
Winner	Emperor's Cup	2006
- * Club domestic league appearances and goals as of end of 2018 season

Yuya Nakamura (中村 祐也, Nakamura Yūya; born April 14, 1986) is a Japanese football player who plays for Aventura Kawaguchi.

== Club statistics ==
Updated to 23 February 2018.

Club performance			League		Cup		League Cup		Continental		Total	
Season	Club	League	Apps	Goals	Apps	Goals	Apps	Goals	Apps	Goals	Apps	Goals
Japan			League		Emperor's Cup		J.League Cup		AFC		Total	
2005	Urawa Reds	J1 League	0	0	0	0	0	0	-		0	0
2006	Urawa Reds	J1 League	0	0	0	0	0	0	-		0	0
2007	Urawa Reds	J1 League	0	0	0	0	0	0	0	0	0	0
2008	Shonan Bellmare	J2 League	5	0	1	0	-		-		6	0
2009	Shonan Bellmare	J2 League	44	14	1	0	-		-		45	14
2010	Shonan Bellmare	J1 League	30	3	1	0	4	2	-		35	5
2011	Shonan Bellmare	J2 League	5	3	0	0	-		-		5	3
2012	Shonan Bellmare	J2 League	8	2	0	0	-		-		8	2
2013	Shonan Bellmare	J1 League	0	0	0	0	0	0	-		0	0
2014	Shonan Bellmare	J2 League	10	1	0	0	-		-		10	1
2015	FC Machida Zelvia	J3 League	16	0	2	0	-		-		18	0
2016	FC Machida Zelvia	J2 League	19	11	1	0	-		-		20	11
2017	FC Machida Zelvia	J2 League	8	0	0	0	-		-		8	0
Career total			161	34	6	0	4	2	0	0	171	36
