= 2011 Shonan Bellmare season =

Shonan Bellmare
2011 season
- Manager: Yasuharu Sorimachi
- Stadium: Hiratsuka Stadium
- J2 League: 14 th

2011 Shonan Bellmare season.

== J2 League ==
Match	Date	Team	Score	Team	Venue	Attendance
1	2011.03.06	Shonan Bellmare	5-0	Fagiano Okayama	Hiratsuka Stadium	10,255
8	2011.04.23	Consadole Sapporo	0-1	Shonan Bellmare	Sapporo Dome	11,734
9	2011.04.30	Shonan Bellmare	0-1	Yokohama FC	Hiratsuka Stadium	10,425
10	2011.05.04	Mito HollyHock	0-0	Shonan Bellmare	K's denki Stadium Mito	4,086
11	2011.05.08	Shonan Bellmare	1-1	Ehime FC	Hiratsuka Stadium	7,159
12	2011.05.15	Shonan Bellmare	1-0	Sagan Tosu	Hiratsuka Stadium	6,658
13	2011.05.22	FC Tokyo	1-1	Shonan Bellmare	Ajinomoto Stadium	15,423
14	2011.05.29	Shonan Bellmare	2-0	Thespa Kusatsu	Hiratsuka Stadium	4,705
15	2011.06.04	FC Gifu	0-1	Shonan Bellmare	Gifu Nagaragawa Stadium	5,004
16	2011.06.12	Shonan Bellmare	0-2	Tochigi SC	Hiratsuka Stadium	6,629
17	2011.06.19	Gainare Tottori	4-0	Shonan Bellmare	Tottori Bank Bird Stadium	3,509
18	2011.06.25	Tokushima Vortis	4-0	Shonan Bellmare	Pocarisweat Stadium	3,558
2	2011.06.29	JEF United Chiba	2-0	Shonan Bellmare	Fukuda Denshi Arena	9,228
19	2011.07.02	Shonan Bellmare	1-3	Tokyo Verdy	Hiratsuka Stadium	6,336
20	2011.07.09	Fagiano Okayama	1-1	Shonan Bellmare	Kanko Stadium	8,621
21	2011.07.17	Shonan Bellmare	2-0	JEF United Chiba	Hiratsuka Stadium	9,340
22	2011.07.23	Oita Trinita	3-1	Shonan Bellmare	Oita Bank Dome	7,466
23	2011.07.31	Shonan Bellmare	1-0	Roasso Kumamoto	Hiratsuka Stadium	7,751
3	2011.08.07	Shonan Bellmare	2-2	Oita Trinita	Hiratsuka Stadium	6,850
24	2011.08.14	Ehime FC	0-0	Shonan Bellmare	Ningineer Stadium	3,517
25	2011.08.21	Thespa Kusatsu	1-0	Shonan Bellmare	Shoda Shoyu Stadium Gunma	3,018
26	2011.08.27	Shonan Bellmare	1-1	Giravanz Kitakyushu	Hiratsuka Stadium	6,728
4	2011.09.04	Roasso Kumamoto	1-1	Shonan Bellmare	Roasso Kumamoto	4,238
27	2011.09.11	Kataller Toyama	2-3	Shonan Bellmare	Kataller Toyama	3,103
28	2011.09.18	Shonan Bellmare	3-2	Mito HollyHock	Hiratsuka Stadium	7,547
29	2011.09.25	Sagan Tosu	2-0	Shonan Bellmare	Best Amenity Stadium	13,566
5	2011.09.28	Shonan Bellmare	2-0	Kataller Toyama	Hiratsuka Stadium	4,571
30	2011.10.01	Shonan Bellmare	0-1	Gainare Tottori	Hiratsuka Stadium	5,179
31	2011.10.15	Tochigi SC	0-3	Shonan Bellmare	Tochigi Green Stadium	3,122
6	2011.10.19	Giravanz Kitakyushu	0-0	Shonan Bellmare	Honjo Stadium	3,011
32	2011.10.22	Shonan Bellmare	7-1	FC Gifu	Hiratsuka Stadium	4,881
7	2011.10.26	Shonan Bellmare	0-1	Kyoto Sanga FC	Hiratsuka Stadium	6,104
33	2011.10.29	Kyoto Sanga FC	1-0	Shonan Bellmare	Kyoto Nishikyogoku Athletic Stadium	7,090
34	2011.11.06	Shonan Bellmare	1-2	FC Tokyo	Hiratsuka Stadium	9,292
35	2011.11.13	Yokohama FC	3-2	Shonan Bellmare	NHK Spring Mitsuzawa Football Stadium	7,382
36	2011.11.19	Shonan Bellmare	1-2	Tokushima Vortis	Hiratsuka Stadium	3,680
37	2011.11.26	Shonan Bellmare	0-2	Consadole Sapporo	Hiratsuka Stadium	7,828
38	2011.12.03	Tokyo Verdy	2-2	Shonan Bellmare	Ajinomoto Stadium	3,929
