= 2000 Mito HollyHock season =

Mito HollyHock
2000 season
- Manager: Babic Branko
- Stadium: Hitachinaka City Stadium
- J.League 2: 9th
- Emperor's Cup: 3rd Round
- J.League Cup: 1st Round
- Top goalscorer: Norio Murata (9)
Home colours	Away colours

2000 Mito HollyHock season

== Competitions ==
Competitions	Position
J.League 2	9th / 11 clubs
Emperor's Cup	3rd round
J.League Cup	1st round

== Domestic results ==
=== J.League 2 ===
11 March 2000 1	Urawa Red Diamonds	2-0	Mito HollyHock	Urawa Komaba Stadium
JST (UTC+09)

19 March 2000 2	Mito HollyHock	2-1	Oita Trinita	Hitachinaka City Stadium
JST (UTC+09)

26 March 2000 3	Montedio Yamagata	1-2	Mito HollyHock	Yamagata Park Stadium
JST (UTC+09)

4	bye

2 April 2000 5	Mito HollyHock	0-1	Shonan Bellmare	Hitachi Athletic Stadium
JST (UTC+09)

9 April 2000 6	Omiya Ardija	1-0	Mito HollyHock	Omiya Football Stadium
JST (UTC+09)

16 April 2000 7	Mito HollyHock	1-0 (GG) (a.e.t.)	Sagan Tosu	Hitachi Athletic Stadium
JST (UTC+09)

22 April 2000 8	Ventforet Kofu	0-3	Mito HollyHock	Nirasaki Central Park Stadium
JST (UTC+09)

30 April 2000 9	Mito HollyHock	0-2	Consadole Sapporo	Hitachinaka City Stadium
JST (UTC+09)

4 May 2000 10	Albirex Niigata	0-1	Mito HollyHock	Niigata City Athletic Stadium
JST (UTC+09)

7 May 2000 11	Mito HollyHock	0-0 (GG) (a.e.t.)	Vegalta Sendai	Hitachinaka City Stadium
JST (UTC+09)

14 May 2000 12	Mito HollyHock	1-2	Urawa Red Diamonds	Hitachi Athletic Stadium
JST (UTC+09)

18 May 2000 13	Oita Trinita	3-0	Mito HollyHock	Oita Athletic Stadium
JST (UTC+09)

21 May 2000 14	Mito HollyHock	3-1	Montedio Yamagata	Hitachinaka City Stadium
JST (UTC+09)

15	bye

1 June 2000 16	Shonan Bellmare	2-1	Mito HollyHock	Hiratsuka Athletics Stadium
JST (UTC+09)

4 June 2000 17	Mito HollyHock	0-2	Omiya Ardija	Hitachi Athletic Stadium
JST (UTC+09)

10 June 2000 18	Sagan Tosu	1-1 (GG) (a.e.t.)	Mito HollyHock	Tosu Stadium
JST (UTC+09)

17 June 2000 19	Mito HollyHock	2-0	Ventforet Kofu	Hitachinaka City Stadium
JST (UTC+09)

21 June 2000 20	Consadole Sapporo	3-0	Mito HollyHock	Sapporo Atsubetsu Park Stadium
JST (UTC+09)

25 June 2000 21	Mito HollyHock	1-0 (GG) (a.e.t.)	Albirex Niigata	Hitachi Athletic Stadium
JST (UTC+09)

1 July 2000 22	Vegalta Sendai	1-0	Mito HollyHock	Sendai Stadium
JST (UTC+09)

23	bye

22 July 2000 24	Mito HollyHock	2-1	Shonan Bellmare	Tochigi Green Stadium
JST (UTC+09)

28 July 2000 25	Omiya Ardija	3-1	Mito HollyHock	Konosu Stadium
JST (UTC+09)

2 August 2000 26	Mito HollyHock	1-4	Sagan Tosu	Hitachinaka City Stadium
JST (UTC+09)

6 August 2000 27	Ventforet Kofu	0-1	Mito HollyHock	Fujihokuroku Park Stadium
JST (UTC+09)

12 August 2000 28	Mito HollyHock	0-2	Consadole Sapporo	Hitachinaka City Stadium
JST (UTC+09)

18 August 2000 29	Albirex Niigata	1-1 (GG) (a.e.t.)	Mito HollyHock	Niigata City Athletic Stadium
JST (UTC+09)

27 August 2000 30	Mito HollyHock	1-5	Vegalta Sendai	Hitachi Athletic Stadium
JST (UTC+09)

2 September 2000 31	Urawa Red Diamonds	3-2 (GG) (a.e.t.)	Mito HollyHock	Urawa Komaba Stadium
JST (UTC+09)

10 September 2000 32	Mito HollyHock	0-2	Oita Trinita	Hitachi Athletic Stadium
JST (UTC+09)

17 September 2000 33	Montedio Yamagata	0-1	Mito HollyHock	Yamagata Park Stadium
JST (UTC+09)

23 September 2000 34	Shonan Bellmare	1-2 (GG) (a.e.t.)	Mito HollyHock	Hiratsuka Athletics Stadium
JST (UTC+09)

28 September 2000 35	Mito HollyHock	2-1 (GG) (a.e.t.)	Omiya Ardija	Tochigi Green Stadium
JST (UTC+09)

1 October 2000 36	Sagan Tosu	1-2 (GG) (a.e.t.)	Mito HollyHock	Tosu Stadium
JST (UTC+09)

8 October 2000 37	Mito HollyHock	2-1 (GG) (a.e.t.)	Ventforet Kofu	Hitachi Athletic Stadium
JST (UTC+09)

15 October 2000 38	Consadole Sapporo	5-0	Mito HollyHock	Sapporo Atsubetsu Park Stadium
JST (UTC+09)

22 October 2000 39	Mito HollyHock	1-1 (GG) (a.e.t.)	Albirex Niigata	Hitachinaka City Stadium
JST (UTC+09)

29 October 2000 40	Vegalta Sendai	2-0	Mito HollyHock	Sendai Stadium
JST (UTC+09)

5 November 2000 41	Mito HollyHock	0-1	Urawa Red Diamonds	Hitachi Athletic Stadium
JST (UTC+09)

10 November 2000 42	Oita Trinita	3-0	Mito HollyHock	Oita Athletic Stadium
JST (UTC+09)

16 November 2000 43	Mito HollyHock	0-1 (GG) (a.e.t.)	Montedio Yamagata	Hitachinaka City Stadium
JST (UTC+09)

44	bye

=== Emperor's Cup ===
25 November 2000 1st Round	Kaiho Bank	0-3	Mito HollyHock	Okinawa Athletic Stadium
JST (UTC+09)

3 December 2000 2nd Round	Mito HollyHock	2-0	Hannan University	Hitachinaka City Stadium
JST (UTC+09)

10 December 2000 3rd Round	Sanfrecce Hiroshima	7-0	Mito HollyHock	Hiroshima Stadium
JST (UTC+09)

=== J.League Cup ===
7 June 2000 1st Round-1	Shimizu S-Pulse	4-1	Mito HollyHock	Kusanagi Athletic Stadium
JST (UTC+09)

14 June 2000 1st Round-2	Mito HollyHock	1-3 (2-7 agg.)	Shimizu S-Pulse	Tochigi Green Stadium
JST (UTC+09)

== Player statistics ==
No.	Pos.	Nat.	Player	D.o.B. (Age)	Height / Weight	J.League 2		Emperor's Cup		J.League Cup		Total	
No.	Pos.	Nat.	Player	D.o.B. (Age)	Height / Weight	Apps	Goals	Apps	Goals	Apps	Goals	Apps	Goals
1	GK	(Japan)	Koji Homma	April 27, 1977 (aged 22)	cm / kg	40	0						
2	DF	(Japan)	Yasuhiro Yamamura	August 18, 1976 (aged 23)	cm / kg	33	0						
3	DF	(Japan)	Taku Watanabe	November 9, 1971 (aged 28)	cm / kg	33	0						
4	DF	(Japan)	Keiju Karashima	June 24, 1971 (aged 28)	cm / kg	30	0						
5	DF	(Japan)	Toshimasa Toba	July 16, 1975 (aged 24)	cm / kg	38	4						
6	DF	(Japan)	Satoshi Yashiro	December 10, 1974 (aged 25)	cm / kg	1	0						
7	MF	(Japan)	Kota Minami	May 1, 1979 (aged 20)	cm / kg	10	0						
8	MF	(Japan)	Nobuhisa Isono	January 8, 1974 (aged 26)	cm / kg	9	0						
9	FW	(Japan)	Daisuke Sudo	April 25, 1977 (aged 22)	cm / kg	24	2						
10	FW	(Japan)	Hirohito Nakamura	May 9, 1974 (aged 25)	cm / kg	0	0						
11	MF	(Japan)	Yoshifumi Kanakubo	April 19, 1970 (aged 29)	cm / kg	0	0						
11	MF	(Brazil)	João Paulo	July 9, 1964 (aged 35)	cm / kg	15	4						
12	DF	(Japan)	Takashi Sambonsuge	June 5, 1978 (aged 21)	cm / kg	0	0						
13	MF	(Japan)	Yoshio Kitajima	October 29, 1975 (aged 24)	cm / kg	26	1						
14	MF	(Japan)	Jun Mizuno	August 7, 1974 (aged 25)	cm / kg	8	1						
15	MF	(Japan)	Norio Murata	February 7, 1976 (aged 24)	cm / kg	39	9						
16	FW	(Japan)	Kenichi Sugano	August 8, 1971 (aged 28)	cm / kg	24	0						
17	DF	(Japan)	Sota Kasahara	May 9, 1976 (aged 23)	cm / kg	30	3						
18	FW	(Japan)	Shigeo Onoue	July 15, 1976 (aged 23)	cm / kg	21	0						
19	FW	(Japan)	Makoto Yokohama	September 22, 1976 (aged 23)	cm / kg	0	0						
20	MF	(Japan)	Kenji Kitahara	May 10, 1976 (aged 23)	cm / kg	6	0						
21	GK	(Japan)	Tomoaki Sano	April 14, 1968 (aged 31)	cm / kg	0	0						
22	DF	(Japan)	Takashi Kiyama	February 18, 1972 (aged 28)	cm / kg	26	0						
23	FW	(Japan)	Yoshio Kitagawa	August 21, 1978 (aged 21)	cm / kg	14	4						
24	DF	(Japan)	Daisuke Tomita	April 24, 1977 (aged 22)	cm / kg	33	1						
25	MF	(Japan)	Shugo Nishikawa	May 27, 1977 (aged 22)	cm / kg	17	0						
26	FW	(Japan)	Kosuke Maruyama	November 30, 1980 (aged 19)	cm / kg	0	0						
27	FW	(Japan)	Kenichi Tomabechi	April 9, 1976 (aged 23)	cm / kg	0	0						
28	MF	(Japan)	Takashi Imoto	September 29, 1976 (aged 23)	cm / kg	3	0						
29	MF	(Japan)	Takehiro Otani	December 6, 1980 (aged 19)	cm / kg	9	0						
30	MF	(Japan)	Kazuaki Kamizono	November 28, 1981 (aged 18)	cm / kg	0	0						
31	GK	(Japan)	Kazuaki Hayashi	July 29, 1976 (aged 23)	cm / kg	0	0						
32	MF	(Japan)	Nozomu Kanaguchi	September 8, 1981 (aged 18)	cm / kg	10	1						
33	MF	(Japan)	Fumiaki Nakamura	April 23, 1981 (aged 18)	cm / kg	1	0						
34	MF	(Japan)	Yohei Takasu	September 6, 1981 (aged 18)	cm / kg	5	0						
35	FW	(Japan)	Michael Yano	January 22, 1979 (aged 21)	cm / kg	13	0						
36	FW	(Brazil)	Cleber	May 7, 1976 (aged 23)	cm / kg	16	6						
37	MF	(Brazil)	Perez	July 29, 1979 (aged 20)	cm / kg	16	1						
