= 2001 Mito HollyHock season =

Mito HollyHock
2001 season
- Manager: Hiroshi Kobayashi; Masaaki Kanno
- Stadium: Hitachinaka City Stadium
- J.League 2: 11th
- Emperor's Cup: 3rd Round
- J.League Cup: 1st Round
- Top goalscorer: Shin Byung-Ho (11)
Home colours	Away colours

2001 Mito HollyHock season

Mito HollyHock finished 11th in the J.League 2 table.

== Competitions ==
Competitions	Position
J.League 2	11th / 12 clubs
Emperor's Cup	3rd round
J.League Cup	1st round

== Domestic results ==
=== J.League 2 ===
10 March 2001 1	Mito HollyHock	0-1 (GG) (a.e.t.)	Vegalta Sendai	Hitachinaka City Stadium
JST (UTC+09)

17 March 2001 2	Mito HollyHock	1-2 (GG) (a.e.t.)	Oita Trinita	Tochigi Green Stadium
JST (UTC+09)

24 March 2001 3	Omiya Ardija	3-0	Mito HollyHock	Omiya Football Stadium
JST (UTC+09)

31 March 2001 4	Montedio Yamagata	3-0	Mito HollyHock	Yamagata Park Stadium
JST (UTC+09)

8 April 2001 5	Mito HollyHock	2-3 (GG) (a.e.t.)	Yokohama FC	Tochigi Green Stadium
JST (UTC+09)

14 April 2001 6	Ventforet Kofu	3-1	Mito HollyHock	Kose Sports Park Stadium
JST (UTC+09)

21 April 2001 7	Mito HollyHock	3-3 (GG) (a.e.t.)	Sagan Tosu	Tochigi Green Stadium
JST (UTC+09)

28 April 2001 8	Kyoto Purple Sanga	1-1 (GG) (a.e.t.)	Mito HollyHock	Nishikyogoku Athletic Stadium
JST (UTC+09)

3 May 2001 9	Mito HollyHock	0-2	Albirex Niigata	Hitachinaka City Stadium
JST (UTC+09)

6 May 2001 10	Kawasaki Frontale	4-0	Mito HollyHock	Todoroki Athletics Stadium
JST (UTC+09)

12 May 2001 11	Mito HollyHock	0-1	Shonan Bellmare	Hitachinaka City Stadium
JST (UTC+09)

19 May 2001 12	Oita Trinita	1-0	Mito HollyHock	Oita Athletic Stadium
JST (UTC+09)

23 May 2001 13	Mito HollyHock	0-2	Omiya Ardija	Hitachinaka City Stadium
JST (UTC+09)

26 May 2001 14	Mito HollyHock	2-1	Ventforet Kofu	Hitachinaka City Stadium
JST (UTC+09)

17 June 2001 15	Sagan Tosu	2-0	Mito HollyHock	Tosu Stadium
JST (UTC+09)

23 June 2001 16	Mito HollyHock	0-3	Kawasaki Frontale	Hitachinaka City Stadium
JST (UTC+09)

29 June 2001 17	Shonan Bellmare	1-1 (GG) (a.e.t.)	Mito HollyHock	Hiratsuka Athletics Stadium
JST (UTC+09)

7 July 2001 18	Mito HollyHock	0-3	Kyoto Purple Sanga	Hitachinaka City Stadium
JST (UTC+09)

11 July 2001 19	Albirex Niigata	2-0	Mito HollyHock	Niigata City Athletic Stadium
JST (UTC+09)

14 July 2001 20	Vegalta Sendai	4-3	Mito HollyHock	Sendai Stadium
JST (UTC+09)

21 July 2001 21	Mito HollyHock	1-2 (GG) (a.e.t.)	Montedio Yamagata	Hitachinaka City Stadium
JST (UTC+09)

25 July 2001 22	Yokohama FC	5-0	Mito HollyHock	Yokohama Mitsuzawa Stadium
JST (UTC+09)

28 July 2001 23	Mito HollyHock	0-1	Shonan Bellmare	Hitachinaka City Stadium
JST (UTC+09)

3 August 2001 24	Omiya Ardija	4-1	Mito HollyHock	Omiya Football Stadium
JST (UTC+09)

11 August 2001 25	Kyoto Purple Sanga	1-0	Mito HollyHock	Nishikyogoku Athletic Stadium
JST (UTC+09)

14 August 2001 26	Mito HollyHock	2-0	Albirex Niigata	Kasamatsu Stadium
JST (UTC+09)

18 August 2001 27	Ventforet Kofu	2-3 (GG) (a.e.t.)	Mito HollyHock	Kose Sports Park Stadium
JST (UTC+09)

25 August 2001 28	Mito HollyHock	3-2	Sagan Tosu	Hitachinaka City Stadium
JST (UTC+09)

1 September 2001 29	Montedio Yamagata	2-0	Mito HollyHock	Yamagata City Athletic Stadium
JST (UTC+09)

5 September 2001 30	Mito HollyHock	1-0 (GG) (a.e.t.)	Yokohama FC	Kasamatsu Stadium
JST (UTC+09)

10 September 2001 31	Kawasaki Frontale	2-1 (GG) (a.e.t.)	Mito HollyHock	Todoroki Athletics Stadium
JST (UTC+09)

16 September 2001 32	Mito HollyHock	2-1 (GG) (a.e.t.)	Oita Trinita	Kasamatsu Stadium
JST (UTC+09)

19 September 2001 33	Vegalta Sendai	2-1	Mito HollyHock	Sendai Stadium
JST (UTC+09)

22 September 2001 34	Mito HollyHock	0-1 (GG) (a.e.t.)	Kyoto Purple Sanga	Hitachinaka City Stadium
JST (UTC+09)

30 September 2001 35	Sagan Tosu	2-1	Mito HollyHock	Tosu Stadium
JST (UTC+09)

6 October 2001 36	Mito HollyHock	2-0	Ventforet Kofu	Kasamatsu Stadium
JST (UTC+09)

13 October 2001 37	Albirex Niigata	2-1	Mito HollyHock	Niigata Stadium
JST (UTC+09)

17 October 2001 38	Mito HollyHock	1-3	Kawasaki Frontale	Kasamatsu Stadium
JST (UTC+09)

20 October 2001 39	Shonan Bellmare	1-2	Mito HollyHock	Hiratsuka Athletics Stadium
JST (UTC+09)

28 October 2001 40	Mito HollyHock	2-3	Vegalta Sendai	Kasamatsu Stadium
JST (UTC+09)

2 November 2001 41	Oita Trinita	3-1	Mito HollyHock	Oita Athletic Stadium
JST (UTC+09)

6 November 2001 42	Mito HollyHock	2-2 (GG) (a.e.t.)	Omiya Ardija	Kasamatsu Stadium
JST (UTC+09)

10 November 2001 43	Mito HollyHock	0-1 (GG) (a.e.t.)	Montedio Yamagata	Kasamatsu Stadium
JST (UTC+09)

18 November 2001 44	Yokohama FC	6-0	Mito HollyHock	Yokohama Mitsuzawa Stadium
JST (UTC+09)

=== Emperor's Cup ===
25 November 2001 1st Round	Gifu Industries High School	1-7	Mito HollyHock	Gifu Nagaragawa Stadium
JST (UTC+09)

2 December 2001 2nd Round	Mito HollyHock	1-0	Denso	Hitachinaka City Stadium
JST (UTC+09)

9 December 2001 3rd Round	Gamba Osaka	5-0	Mito HollyHock	Osaka Expo '70 Stadium
JST (UTC+09)

=== J.League Cup ===
4 April 2001 1st Round-1	Mito HollyHock	0-1	Yokohama F. Marinos	Tochigi Green Stadium
JST (UTC+09)

18 April 2001 1st Round-2	Yokohama F. Marinos	3-1 (4-1 agg.)	Mito HollyHock	Yokohama Mitsuzawa Stadium
JST (UTC+09)

== Player statistics ==
No.	Pos.	Nat.	Player	D.o.B. (Age)	Height / Weight	J.League 2		Emperor's Cup		J.League Cup		Total	
No.	Pos.	Nat.	Player	D.o.B. (Age)	Height / Weight	Apps	Goals	Apps	Goals	Apps	Goals	Apps	Goals
1	GK	(Japan)	Koji Homma	April 27, 1977 (aged 23)	cm / kg	31	0						
2	DF	(Japan)	Masanori Kizawa	June 2, 1969 (aged 31)	cm / kg	34	0						
3	DF	(Japan)	Makoto Takeya	July 27, 1977 (aged 23)	cm / kg	19	0						
4	DF	(Japan)	Keiju Karashima	June 24, 1972 (aged 28)	cm / kg	6	0						
5	DF	(Japan)	Toshimasa Toba	July 16, 1975 (aged 25)	cm / kg	21	0						
6	DF	(Japan)	Masato Yamasaki	April 7, 1980 (aged 20)	cm / kg	17	0						
7	DF	(Japan)	Masaaki Koido	April 9, 1978 (aged 22)	cm / kg	6	0						
8	MF	(Japan)	Yohei Takasu	September 6, 1981 (aged 19)	cm / kg	3	0						
9	FW	(Japan)	Daisuke Sudo	April 25, 1977 (aged 23)	cm / kg	43	10						
10	MF	(Japan)	Nobuyasu Ikeda	May 18, 1970 (aged 30)	cm / kg	8	1						
11	FW	(Japan)	Yoshio Kitagawa	August 21, 1978 (aged 22)	cm / kg	5	0						
13	MF	(Japan)	Yoshio Kitajima	October 29, 1975 (aged 25)	cm / kg	36	1						
14	FW	(Japan)	Yu Kawamura	December 1, 1980 (aged 20)	cm / kg	40	3						
15	MF	(Japan)	Kazuaki Kamizono	November 28, 1981 (aged 19)	cm / kg	25	1						
16	FW	(Japan)	Kenichi Sugano	August 8, 1971 (aged 29)	cm / kg	11	0						
17	DF	(Japan)	Sota Kasahara	May 9, 1976 (aged 24)	cm / kg	0	0						
18	MF	(Japan)	Takehiro Otani	December 6, 1980 (aged 20)	cm / kg	6	0						
19	MF	(Japan)	Nozomu Kanaguchi	September 8, 1981 (aged 19)	cm / kg	5	0						
20	FW	(Japan)	Takayoshi Ono	April 30, 1978 (aged 22)	cm / kg	28	2						
21	GK	(Japan)	Ken Ishikawa	February 6, 1970 (aged 31)	cm / kg	15	0						
22	DF	(Japan)	Takashi Kiyama	February 18, 1972 (aged 29)	cm / kg	27	0						
23	FW	(Japan)	Hirohito Nakamura	May 9, 1974 (aged 26)	cm / kg	9	0						
23	MF	(North Korea)	Hwang Hak-Sun	October 10, 1976 (aged 24)	cm / kg	17	0						
24	DF	(Japan)	Daisuke Tomita	April 24, 1977 (aged 23)	cm / kg	36	2						
25	DF	(Japan)	Keita Isozaki	November 17, 1980 (aged 20)	cm / kg	25	0						
26	FW	(Japan)	Yoichi Mori	August 1, 1980 (aged 20)	cm / kg	9	0						
26	MF	(Japan)	Toshiki Koike	November 10, 1974 (aged 26)	cm / kg	16	1						
27	MF	(Japan)	Masahiro Ōhashi	June 23, 1981 (aged 19)	cm / kg	35	7						
28	GK	(Japan)	Kazuaki Hayashi	July 29, 1976 (aged 24)	cm / kg	0	0						
29	DF	(Japan)	Masaki Ogawa	April 3, 1975 (aged 25)	cm / kg	21	0						
30	FW	(South Korea)	Shin Byung-Ho	April 26, 1977 (aged 23)	cm / kg	28	11						
32	MF	(South Korea)	An Sun-Jin	September 19, 1975 (aged 25)	cm / kg	22	0						

== Other pages ==
- (in Japanese) J. League official site
