= Kitajima =

Kitajima (written: 北島) is a Japanese surname. Notable people with the surname include:

- Toru Kitajima, Japanese Singer-songwriter
- Hideaki Kitajima, Japanese football player
- Keizō Kitajima, Japanese photographer
- Kosuke Kitajima, Japanese swimmer
- Osamu Kitajima, Japanese electronic music composer and performer
- Manabu Kitajima, Japanese millionaire
- Saburō Kitajima, Japanese singer
- Tadao Kitajima, Japanese shogi player
- Takeshi Kitajima (born 1977), Japanese volleyball player
- Yoshio Kitajima, Japanese football player
- Yuji Kitajima (北島 祐二, born 2000), Japanese footballer
- Ian Kitajima, Brazilian sailor

== See also ==
- Kitajima, Tokushima
