= Shigeo =

- Gender: Male

Origin
- Origin: Japanese
- Meaning: Different meanings depending on the kanji used

Shigeo (written: 樹央, 茂雄, 茂生, 茂男, 茂夫, 成雄, 成男, 重雄, 重男, 重夫, 繁雄, 繁男, 晟郎, 殖生 or 滋雄) is a masculine Japanese given name. Notable people with the name include:

- Shigeo Anzai (安斎 重男; born 1939), Japanese photographer
- Shigeo Arai (新井 茂雄; 1916–1944), Japanese swimmer
- Shigeo Fukuda (福田 繁雄; 1932–2009), Japanese sculptor and graphic designer
- Shigeo Fukushima (福島 滋雄; born 1943), Japanese swimmer
- Shigeo Gochō (牛腸 茂雄; 1946–1983), Japanese photographer
- Shigeo Hayashi (林 重男; 1918–2002), Japanese photographer
- Shigeo Hirose (広瀬 茂男; born 1947), Japanese inventor and academic
- Shigeo Itoh (伊藤 繁雄; born 1945), Japanese table tennis player
- Shigeo Kishibe (岸辺 成雄; 1912–2005), Japanese musicologist
- Shigeo Kitamura (北村 茂男; born 1945), Japanese politician
- Shigeo Kobayashi (小林 成男; born 1970), Japanese actor
- Shigeo Kurata (倉田 重夫), Japanese botanist
- Shigeo Maruyama (丸山 茂雄; born 1941), Japanese businessman
- Shigeo Maruyama (丸山 茂夫), Japanese engineer
- Matsunobori Shigeo (松登 晟郎; 1924–1986), Japanese sumo wrestler
- Shigeo Nagashima (長嶋 茂雄; 1936–2025), Japanese baseball player and manager
- Shigeo Nakagawa (中川 重雄; born 1910), Japanese swimmer
- Shigeo Nakajima (中島 成雄; born 1954), Japanese boxer
- Shigeo Nakata (中田 茂男; born 1945), Japanese sport wrestler
- Shigeo Ogata (緒方 茂生; born 1968), Japanese footballer
- Shigeo Okumura (奥村 茂雄; born 1972), Japanese professional wrestler
- Shigeo Omae (大前 繁雄; born 1942), Japanese politician
- Shigeo Onoue (尾上 恵生; born 1976), Japanese footballer
- Shigeo Sasaki (佐々木 重夫; 1912–1987), Japanese mathematician
- Shigeo Satomura (里村 茂夫; 1919–1960), Japanese physicist
- Shigeo Sawairi (沢入 重雄; born 1963), Japanese footballer and manager
- Shigeo Shingo (新郷 重夫; 1909–1990), Japanese engineer
- Shigeo Sugimoto (杉本 茂雄; 1926–2002), Japanese footballer
- Shigeo Sugiura (杉浦 重雄; 1917–1988), Japanese swimmer
- Shigeo Takahashi (高橋 茂雄, born 1976), Japanese owarai tarento
- Shigeo Takaya (高谷 茂男; born 1937), Japanese mayor
- Shigeo Takii (滝井 繁男; born 1936), Japanese judge
- Shigeo Tokuda (徳田 重男; born 1934), Japanese AV actor
- Shigeo Tomita (富田 樹央, born 1982), Japanese actor
- Shigeo Yaegashi (八重樫 茂生; 1933–2011), Japanese footballer and manager
- Shigeo Yanagida (柳田 殖生; born 1982), Japanese baseball player
