= 2002 Mito HollyHock season =

Mito HollyHock
2002 season
- Manager: Masaaki Kanno
- Stadium: Kasamatsu Stadium
- J. League 2: 10th
- Emperor's Cup: 3rd Round
- Top goalscorer: Takayoshi Ono (14)
Home colours	Away colours

2002 Mito HollyHock season.

== Competitions ==
Competitions	Position
J. League 2	10th / 12 clubs
Emperor's Cup	3rd Round

== Domestic results ==
=== J. League 2 ===
Match	Date	Venue	Opponents	Score
1	2002.3.3	Hitachinaka (ja:ひたちなか市総合運動公園陸上競技場)	Albirex Niigata	0-1
2	2002.3.9	Hiratsuka Athletics Stadium	Shonan Bellmare	1-2
3	2002.3.16	Hitachinaka (ja:ひたちなか市総合運動公園陸上競技場)	Ventforet Kofu	0-1
5	2002.3.24	Todoroki Athletics Stadium	Kawasaki Frontale	0-1
4	2002.3.27	Hitachinaka (ja:ひたちなか市総合運動公園陸上競技場)	Omiya Ardija	1-0
6	2002.3.30	Hitachinaka (ja:ひたちなか市総合運動公園陸上競技場)	Sagan Tosu	3-0
7	2002.4.6	Yamagata Park Stadium	Montedio Yamagata	0-2
8	2002.4.10	Hitachinaka (ja:ひたちなか市総合運動公園陸上競技場)	Cerezo Osaka	1-2
9	2002.4.13	Hitachinaka (ja:ひたちなか市総合運動公園陸上競技場)	Yokohama F.C.	1-1
10	2002.4.20	Hakata no mori stadium	Avispa Fukuoka	0-4
11	2002.4.24	Oita (ja:大分市営陸上競技場)	Oita Trinita	0-1
12	2002.4.28	Hitachinaka (ja:ひたちなか市総合運動公園陸上競技場)	Shonan Bellmare	2-1
13	2002.5.3	Ōmiya Park Soccer Stadium	Omiya Ardija	0-2
14	2002.5.6	Kasamatsu Stadium	Kawasaki Frontale	0-1
15	2002.5.12	Tosu Stadium	Sagan Tosu	1-0
16	2002.7.6	Mito City Athletic Stadium	Montedio Yamagata	2-1
17	2002.7.10	Nagai Stadium	Cerezo Osaka	1-4
18	2002.7.13	Hitachinaka (ja:ひたちなか市総合運動公園陸上競技場)	Oita Trinita	2-2
19	2002.7.20	Niigata Stadium	Albirex Niigata	0-1
20	2002.7.24	Mitsuzawa (ja:横浜市Mitsuzawa Stadium公園陸上競技場)	Yokohama F.C.	1-1
21	2002.7.27	Hitachinaka (ja:ひたちなか市総合運動公園陸上競技場)	Avispa Fukuoka	5-3
22	2002.8.3	Kose Sports Stadium	Ventforet Kofu	1-2
23	2002.8.7	Hitachinaka (ja:ひたちなか市総合運動公園陸上競技場)	Sagan Tosu	2-2
24	2002.8.10	Oita (ja:大分市営陸上競技場)	Oita Trinita	2-3
25	2002.8.17	Kasamatsu Stadium	Cerezo Osaka	1-3
26	2002.8.21	Kasamatsu Stadium	Yokohama F.C.	3-1
27	2002.8.25	Hiratsuka Athletics Stadium	Shonan Bellmare	0-1
28	2002.8.31	Kasamatsu Stadium	Albirex Niigata	2-1
29	2002.9.7	Yamagata Park Stadium	Montedio Yamagata	1-0
30	2002.9.11	Hakata no mori stadium	Avispa Fukuoka	1-2
31	2002.9.14	Mito City Athletic Stadium	Omiya Ardija	1-1
32	2002.9.21	Todoroki Athletics Stadium	Kawasaki Frontale	0-2
33	2002.9.25	Kasamatsu Stadium	Ventforet Kofu	1-2
34	2002.9.29	Saga Stadium	Sagan Tosu	0-2
35	2002.10.5	Mitsuzawa Stadium	Yokohama F.C.	1-1
36	2002.10.9	Kasamatsu Stadium	Avispa Fukuoka	3-2
37	2002.10.12	Ōmiya Park Soccer Stadium	Omiya Ardija	0-2
38	2002.10.19	Kasamatsu Stadium	Shonan Bellmare	1-4
39	2002.10.23	Kose Sports Stadium	Ventforet Kofu	0-1
40	2002.10.26	Kasamatsu Stadium	Kawasaki Frontale	1-2
41	2002.11.2	Kasamatsu Stadium	Montedio Yamagata	0-0
42	2002.11.9	Nagai Stadium	Cerezo Osaka	1-5
43	2002.11.16	Kasamatsu Stadium	Oita Trinita	1-0
44	2002.11.24	Niigata City Athletic Stadium	Albirex Niigata	1-3

=== Emperor's Cup ===
Match	Date	Venue	Opponents	Score
1st Round	2002..			-
2nd Round	2002..			-
3rd Round	2002..			-

== Player statistics ==
No.	Pos.	Player	D.o.B. (Age)	Height / Weight	J. League 2		Emperor's Cup		Total	
No.	Pos.	Player	D.o.B. (Age)	Height / Weight	Apps	Goals	Apps	Goals	Apps	Goals
1	GK	Koji Homma	April 27, 1977 (aged 24)	cm / kg	28	0				
2	DF	Masanori Kizawa	June 2, 1969 (aged 32)	cm / kg	40	0				
3	DF	Daisuke Tomita	April 24, 1977 (aged 24)	cm / kg	36	2				
4	DF	Masaki Ogawa	April 3, 1975 (aged 26)	cm / kg	41	2				
5	DF	Toshimasa Toba	July 16, 1975 (aged 26)	cm / kg	34	0				
6	DF	Masato Yamasaki	April 7, 1980 (aged 21)	cm / kg	34	6				
7	MF	An Sun-Jin	September 19, 1975 (aged 26)	cm / kg	28	0				
8	MF	Yoshio Kitajima	October 29, 1975 (aged 26)	cm / kg	38	1				
9	FW	Tomotaka Fukagawa	July 24, 1972 (aged 29)	cm / kg	17	0				
10	MF	Nobuyasu Ikeda	May 18, 1970 (aged 31)	cm / kg	21	0				
11	FW	Yoshio Kitagawa	August 21, 1978 (aged 23)	cm / kg	31	7				
13	FW	Kentaro Yoshida	October 5, 1980 (aged 21)	cm / kg	31	5				
14	MF	Taijiro Kurita	March 3, 1975 (aged 27)	cm / kg	42	2				
15	MF	Kazuaki Kamizono	November 28, 1981 (aged 20)	cm / kg	39	1				
16	MF	Hwang Hak-Sun	October 10, 1976 (aged 25)	cm / kg	17	1				
17	DF	Keita Isozaki	November 17, 1980 (aged 21)	cm / kg	6	0				
18	FW	Takayoshi Ono	April 30, 1978 (aged 23)	cm / kg	36	14				
19	DF	Hiroshi Haizuka	September 23, 1980 (aged 21)	cm / kg	0	0				
20	DF	Ryoji Yamanaka	April 19, 1983 (aged 18)	cm / kg	1	0				
21	GK	Ken Ishikawa	February 6, 1970 (aged 32)	cm / kg	17	0				
22	DF	Takashi Kiyama	February 18, 1972 (aged 30)	cm / kg	31	1				
23	MF	Marcus	February 14, 1980 (aged 22)	cm / kg	0	0				
24	MF	Chihiro Matoba	February 26, 1980 (aged 22)	cm / kg	0	0				
25	FW	Tsuyoshi Kaneko	April 8, 1983 (aged 18)	cm / kg	2	0				
26	MF	Shohei Yamamoto	August 29, 1982 (aged 19)	cm / kg	25	0				
27	MF	Kenji Hada	June 27, 1981 (aged 20)	cm / kg	6	0				
28	MF	Nozomu Kanaguchi	September 8, 1981 (aged 20)	cm / kg	10	1				
31	GK	Hiroyuki Takeda	November 30, 1983 (aged 18)	cm / kg	0	0				

== Other pages ==
- (in Japanese) J. League official site
