= 2003 Mito HollyHock season =

Mito HollyHock
2003 season
- Manager: Hideki Maeda
- Stadium: Kasamatsu Stadium
- J. League 2: 7th
- Emperor's Cup: 3rd Round
- Top goalscorer: Marcus Tulio Tanaka (10)
Home colours	Away colours

2003 Mito HollyHock season

== Competitions ==
Competitions	Position
J. League 2	7th / 12 clubs
Emperor's Cup	3rd Round

== Domestic results ==
=== J. League 2 ===
Match	Date	Venue	Opponents	Score
1	2003.3.15	Hakatanomori Athletic Stadium	Avispa Fukuoka	2-1
2	2003.3.21	Mito City Athletic Stadium	Ventforet Kofu	1-0
3	2003.3.29	Sapporo Dome	Consadole Sapporo	4-2
4	2003.4.5	Hitachinaka (ja:ひたちなか市総合運動公園陸上競技場)	Omiya Ardija	0-2
5	2003.4.9	Hiroshima Stadium	Sanfrecce Hiroshima	0-3
6	2003.4.12	Hitachinaka (ja:ひたちなか市総合運動公園陸上競技場)	Shonan Bellmare	1-0
7	2003.4.19	Todoroki Athletics Stadium	Kawasaki Frontale	2-2
8	2003.4.26	Hitachinaka (ja:ひたちなか市総合運動公園陸上競技場)	Sagan Tosu	1-0
9	2003.4.29	Kasamatsu Stadium	Yokohama F.C.	2-0
10	2003.5.5	Niigata Stadium	Albirex Niigata	2-2
11	2003.5.10	Yamagata Park Stadium	Montedio Yamagata	0-1
12	2003.5.14	Hitachinaka (ja:ひたちなか市総合運動公園陸上競技場)	Avispa Fukuoka	1-1
13	2003.5.17	Kose Sports Stadium	Ventforet Kofu	2-0
14	2003.5.24	Mito City Athletic Stadium	Consadole Sapporo	1-1
15	2003.5.31	Ōmiya Park Soccer Stadium	Omiya Ardija	3-1
16	2003.6.7	Kasamatsu Stadium	Albirex Niigata	0-1
17	2003.6.14	Mito City Athletic Stadium	Montedio Yamagata	0-2
18	2003.6.18	Tosu Stadium	Sagan Tosu	0-0
19	2003.6.22	Kasamatsu Stadium	Kawasaki Frontale	0-1
20	2003.6.28	Hiratsuka Athletics Stadium	Shonan Bellmare	0-1
21	2003.7.2	Kasamatsu Stadium	Sanfrecce Hiroshima	0-1
22	2003.7.5	Mitsuzawa Stadium	Yokohama F.C.	2-1
23	2003.7.19	Yamagata Park Stadium	Montedio Yamagata	0-0
24	2003.7.26	Kasamatsu Stadium	Ventforet Kofu	1-2
25	2003.7.30	Hakatanomori Athletic Stadium	Avispa Fukuoka	0-1
26	2003.8.2	Kasamatsu Stadium	Omiya Ardija	1-2
27	2003.8.10	Niigata Stadium	Albirex Niigata	0-0
28	2003.8.17	Todoroki Athletics Stadium	Kawasaki Frontale	2-1
29	2003.8.23	Kasamatsu Stadium	Shonan Bellmare	1-2
30	2003.8.30	Hiroshima Big Arch	Sanfrecce Hiroshima	1-1
31	2003.9.3	Kasamatsu Stadium	Sagan Tosu	1-0
32	2003.9.6	Kasamatsu Stadium	Yokohama F.C.	0-0
33	2003.9.13	Sapporo Atsubetsu Park Stadium	Consadole Sapporo	0-1
34	2003.9.20	Mito City Athletic Stadium	Kawasaki Frontale	0-1
35	2003.9.23	Hiratsuka Athletics Stadium	Shonan Bellmare	1-0
36	2003.9.27	Mito City Athletic Stadium	Montedio Yamagata	1-0
37	2003.10.5	Saga Stadium	Sagan Tosu	1-0
38	2003.10.11	Mitsuzawa Stadium	Yokohama F.C.	1-2
39	2003.10.18	Kasamatsu Stadium	Albirex Niigata	1-0
40	2003.10.25	Kasamatsu Stadium	Sanfrecce Hiroshima	0-0
41	2003.11.1	Ōmiya Park Soccer Stadium	Omiya Ardija	1-3
42	2003.11.9	Kasamatsu Stadium	Consadole Sapporo	0-0
43	2003.11.15	Kose Sports Stadium	Ventforet Kofu	0-1
44	2003.11.23	Kasamatsu Stadium	Avispa Fukuoka	0-1

=== Emperor's Cup ===
Match	Date	Venue	Opponents	Score
1st Round	2003..	[[]]	[[]]	-
2nd Round	2003..	[[]]	[[]]	-
3rd Round	2003..	[[]]	[[]]	-

== Player statistics ==
No.	Pos.	Player	D.o.B. (Age)	Height / Weight	J. League 2		Emperor's Cup		Total	
No.	Pos.	Player	D.o.B. (Age)	Height / Weight	Apps	Goals	Apps	Goals	Apps	Goals
1	GK	Koji Homma	April 27, 1977 (aged 25)	cm / kg	31	0				
2	DF	Masanori Kizawa	June 2, 1969 (aged 33)	cm / kg	24	0				
3	DF	Daisuke Tomita	April 24, 1977 (aged 25)	cm / kg	41	4				
4	DF	Masaki Ogawa	April 3, 1975 (aged 27)	cm / kg	36	0				
5	DF	Toshimasa Toba	July 16, 1975 (aged 27)	cm / kg	10	0				
6	DF	Masato Yamasaki	April 7, 1980 (aged 22)	cm / kg	37	3				
7	MF	Toshiki Koike	November 10, 1974 (aged 28)	cm / kg	4	0				
8	MF	Yoshio Kitajima	October 29, 1975 (aged 27)	cm / kg	0	0				
9	FW	Takayoshi Ono	April 30, 1978 (aged 24)	cm / kg	29	7				
10	MF	Kazuaki Kamizono	November 28, 1981 (aged 21)	cm / kg	6	0				
11	FW	Yoshio Kitagawa	August 21, 1978 (aged 24)	cm / kg	36	2				
13	FW	Kentaro Yoshida	October 5, 1980 (aged 22)	cm / kg	13	0				
14	MF	Taijiro Kurita	March 3, 1975 (aged 28)	cm / kg	44	0				
15	DF	Naoki Mori	November 21, 1977 (aged 25)	cm / kg	38	2				
16	MF	Hwang Hak-Sun	October 10, 1976 (aged 26)	cm / kg	0	0				
17	DF	Keita Isozaki	November 17, 1980 (aged 22)	cm / kg	17	0				
18	MF	Daisuke Kimori	July 28, 1977 (aged 25)	cm / kg	44	4				
19	FW	Shogo Sakurai	April 3, 1984 (aged 18)	cm / kg	8	1				
20	DF	Ryoji Yamanaka	April 19, 1983 (aged 19)	cm / kg	0	0				
21	GK	Go Kaburaki	August 26, 1977 (aged 25)	cm / kg	13	0				
22	DF	Takafumi Yoshimoto	May 13, 1978 (aged 24)	cm / kg	31	0				
23	MF	Mitsutada Ikeda	June 18, 1984 (aged 18)	cm / kg	0	0				
24	MF	Chihiro Matoba	February 26, 1980 (aged 23)	cm / kg	0	0				
25	FW	Tsuyoshi Kaneko	April 8, 1983 (aged 19)	cm / kg	14	2				
26	MF	Shohei Yamamoto	August 29, 1982 (aged 20)	cm / kg	2	0				
27	MF	Kenji Hada	June 27, 1981 (aged 21)	cm / kg	38	0				
28	DF	Marcus Tulio Tanaka	April 24, 1981 (aged 21)	cm / kg	42	10				
29	MF	Pancho	August 19, 1975 (aged 27)	cm / kg	20	0				
30	MF	Frank Lobos	September 25, 1976 (aged 26)	cm / kg	16	1				
31	GK	Hiroyuki Takeda	November 30, 1983 (aged 19)	cm / kg	0	0				
32	GK	Kazuki Sawada	June 5, 1982 (aged 20)	cm / kg	1	0				

== Other pages ==
- (in Japanese) J. League official site
