= Daisuke Sudo =

Japanese footballer and manager

Daisuke Sudo 須藤 大輔
Personal information
- Full name: Daisuke Sudo
- Date of birth: 25 April 1977 (age 49)
- Place of birth: Yokohama, Kanagawa, Japan
- Height: 1.83 m (6 ft 0 in)
- Position: Forward

Team information
- Current team: Yokohama FC (manager)

Youth career
- 1993–1995: Toko Gakuen High School

College career
| Years | Team | Apps | (Gls) |
| 1996–1999 | Tokai University | | |

Senior career*
| Years | Team | Apps | (Gls) |
| 2000–2001 | Mito HollyHock | 67 | (12) |
| 2002 | Shonan Bellmare | 22 | (5) |
| 2003–2007 | Ventforet Kofu | 126 | (23) |
| 2008–2009 | Vissel Kobe | 7 | (1) |
| 2010 | Fujieda MYFC | 4 | (0) |
| Total | | 226 | (41) |

Managerial career
- 2018: Gainare Tottori
- 2021–2025: Fujieda MYFC
- 2026–: Yokohama FC
- * Club domestic league appearances and goals

Daisuke Sudo (須藤 大輔, Sudō Daisuke; born April 25, 1977) is a Japanese professional football manager and former player, who is manager of J2 League club Yokohama FC.

== Playing career ==
Sudo was born in Yokohama on April 25, 1977. After graduating from Tokai University, he joined newly was promoted to J2 League club, Mito HollyHock in 2000. He became a regular player as forward from first season. In 2001, he played many matches and scored 10 goals. In 2002, he moved to J2 club Shonan Bellmare. He played many matches as substitute forward. In 2003, he moved to J2 club Ventforet Kofu. He played many matches and the club won the 3rd place in 2005 and was promoted to J1 League from 2006. At 2007 J.League Cup, he scored 6 goals and became a top scorer. In 2008, he moved to J1 club Vissel Kobe. However he could hardly play in the match for injuries in 2 seasons. In 2010, he moved to Regional Leagues club Fujieda MYFC. He retired end of 2010 season.

== Coaching career ==
In June 2018, Sudo signed with J3 League club Gainare Tottori and became a manager. The club finished at the 3rd place in 2018 season and he resigned end of 2018 season.

In 12 July 2021, he was appointed as manager of Fujieda MYFC to replace Yasuharu Kurata who resigned 12 July 2021. On 20 November 2022, he led his club to promotion to the J2 League for the first time in history as it finished in the runners-up position. A day later, he won manager of the year in the 2022 season. He resigned from club in 2025.

On 8 December 2025, it was announced that Sudo would become manager of newly-relegated J2 club Yokohama FC ahead of the 2026 season.

== Career statistics ==
=== Club ===
| Club performance | | | League | | Cup | | League Cup | | Total | |
| Season | Club | League | Apps | Goals | Apps | Goals | Apps | Goals | Apps | Goals |
| Japan | | | League | | Emperor's Cup | | J.League Cup | | Total | |
|---|---|---|---|---|---|---|---|---|---|---|
| 2000 | Mito HollyHock | J2 League | 24 | 2 | 1 | 0 | 1 | 1 | 26 | 3 |
| 2001 | Mito HollyHock | J2 League | 43 | 10 | 3 | 1 | 2 | 0 | 48 | 11 |
| 2002 | Shonan Bellmare | J2 League | 22 | 5 | – | | | | 22 | 5 |
| 2003 | Ventforet Kofu | J2 League | 36 | 7 | 3 | 2 | – | | 39 | 9 |
| 2004 | Ventforet Kofu | J2 League | 24 | 3 | 1 | 0 | – | | 25 | 3 |
| 2005 | Ventforet Kofu | J2 League | 28 | 8 | 2 | 0 | – | | 30 | 8 |
| 2006 | Ventforet Kofu | J1 League | 15 | 1 | 3 | 3 | 3 | 0 | 21 | 4 |
| 2007 | Ventforet Kofu | J1 League | 23 | 4 | 0 | 0 | 8 | 6 | 31 | 10 |
| 2008 | Vissel Kobe | J1 League | 5 | 0 | 0 | 0 | 3 | 0 | 8 | 0 |
| 2009 | Vissel Kobe | J1 League | 2 | 1 | 0 | 0 | 0 | 0 | 2 | 1 |
| 2010 | Fujieda MYFC | Regional Leagues | 4 | 0 | – | | | | 4 | 0 |
| Total | | | 226 | 41 | 13 | 6 | 17 | 7 | 256 | 54 |

== Managerial statistics ==
As of the start from 2026–27 season.

Managerial record by club and tenure
| Team | From | To | Record | | | | |
| Team | From | To | G | W | D | L | Win % |
|---|---|---|---|---|---|---|---|
| Gainare Tottori | 4 June 2018 | 31 January 2019 | 21 | 10 | 5 | 6 | 47.62 |
| Fujieda MYFC | 12 July 2021 | 31 January 2026 | 174 | 64 | 36 | 74 | 36.78 |
| Yokohama FC | 8 December 2025 | present | 0 | 0 | 0 | 0 | — |
| Total | | | 195 | 74 | 41 | 80 | 37.95 |

== Honours ==
=== Manager ===
Fujieda MYFC

- Promotion to J2 League 2023

Individual

- J3 League Manager of the Year: 2022
