= Yoshio Kitagawa =

Japanese footballer

Yoshio Kitagawa 北川 佳男
Personal information
- Full name: Yoshio Kitagawa
- Date of birth: August 21, 1978 (age 48)
- Place of birth: Kyoto, Japan
- Height: 1.76 m (5 ft 9 1/2 in)
- Position: Forward

Youth career
- 1994–1996: Higashiyama High School

Senior career*
Years	Team	Apps	(Gls)
1997–1999	Sagawa Express Osaka		
2000–2003	Mito HollyHock	86	(13)
2004–2006	ALO's Hokuriku	92	(41)
2007–2008	Roasso Kumamoto	24	(4)
Total		202	(58)
- * Club domestic league appearances and goals

Yoshio Kitagawa (北川 佳男, Kitagawa Yoshio; born August 21, 1978) is a former Japanese football player.

== Playing career ==
Kitagawa was born in Kyoto Prefecture on August 21, 1978. After graduating from high school, he joined the Regional Leagues club Sagawa Express Osaka in 1997. In 2000, he moved to the newly promoted J2 League club, Mito HollyHock. He became a regular player as a forward in 2002. In 2004, he moved to the Japan Football League (JFL) club ALO's Hokuriku. He played as a regular player and scored many goals during three seasons. In 2007, he moved to the JFL club Rosso Kumamoto (later Roasso Kumamoto). He played often and the club was promoted to J2 in 2008. However he did not play much after that, and retired at the end of the 2008 season.

== Club statistics ==
Club performance			League		Cup		League Cup		Total	
Season	Club	League	Apps	Goals	Apps	Goals	Apps	Goals	Apps	Goals
Japan			League		Emperor's Cup		J.League Cup		Total	
2000	Mito HollyHock	J2 League	14	4	3	4	2	0	19	8
2001	Mito HollyHock	J2 League	5	0	0	0	0	0	5	0
2002	Mito HollyHock	J2 League	31	7	3	6	-		34	13
2003	Mito HollyHock	J2 League	36	2	3	1	-		39	3
2004	ALO's Hokuriku	Football League	29	9	2	2	-		31	11
2005	ALO's Hokuriku	Football League	30	10	4	4	-		34	14
2006	ALO's Hokuriku	Football League	33	22	-		-		33	22
2007	Rosso Kumamoto	Football League	20	4	1	0	-		21	4
2008	Roasso Kumamoto	J2 League	4	0	0	0	-		4	0
Total			202	58	16	17	2	0	220	75
