= Norio Murata =

Japanese footballer

Norio Murata 村田 教生
Personal information
- Full name: Norio Murata
- Date of birth: February 7, 1976 (age 50)
- Place of birth: Aichi, Japan
- Height: 1.64 m (5 ft 4 1/2 in)
- Position: Midfielder

Youth career
- 1991–1993: Toin Gakuen High School
- 1994–1997: Chukyo University

Senior career*
Years	Team	Apps	(Gls)
1998–1999	Oita Trinita	26	(4)
2000	Mito HollyHock	39	(9)
2001–2002	Gunma FC Horikoshi		
2003–2004	Okinawa Kariyushi FC		
2005	Denso		
Total		65	(13)
- * Club domestic league appearances and goals

Norio Murata (村田 教生, Murata Norio; born February 7, 1976) is a former Japanese football player.

== Playing career ==
Murata was born in Aichi Prefecture on February 7, 1976. After graduating from Chukyo University, he joined Japan Football League club Oita Trinity (later Oita Trinita) in 1998. He played many matches from first season and the club was promoted to new league J2 League from 1999. However he could hardly play in the match in 1999. In 2000, he moved to newly was promoted to J2 club, Mito HollyHock. He played as regular player in 2000. In 2001, he moved to Prefectural Leagues club Gunma FC Horikoshi. The club was promoted to Regional Leagues from 2002. In 2003, he moved to Regional Leagues club Okinawa Kariyushi FC and played in 2 seasons. In 2005, he moved to Japan Football League club Denso. He retired end of 2005 season.

== Career statistics ==
Appearances and goals by club, season and competition
Club	Season	League			Emperor's Cup		J.League Cup		Total	
Club	Season	Division	Apps	Goals	Apps	Goals	Apps	Goals	Apps	Goals
Oita Trinity	1998	Football League	22	4					22	4
Oita Trinita	1999	J2 League	4	0			1	0	5	0
Mito HollyHock	2000	J2 League	39	9			1	0	40	9
Career total			65	13	0	0	2	0	67	13
