= Toshimasa Toba =

Japanese footballer

Toshimasa Toba 鳥羽 俊正
Personal information
- Full name: Toshimasa Toba
- Date of birth: July 16, 1975 (age 51)
- Place of birth: Aichi, Japan
- Height: 1.70 m (5 ft 7 in)
- Position: Defender

Youth career
- 1991–1993: Chukyo University Chukyo High School
- 1994–1997: Juntendo University

Senior career*
Years	Team	Apps	(Gls)
1998–2003	Mito HollyHock	151	(4)
Total		151	(4)
- * Club domestic league appearances and goals

Toshimasa Toba (鳥羽 俊正, Toba Toshimasa; born July 16, 1975) is a former Japanese football player.

== Playing career ==
Toba was born in Aichi Prefecture on July 16, 1975. After graduating from Juntendo University, he joined Japan Football League club Mito HollyHock in 1998. He played many matches as defender from first season and the club was promoted to J2 League from 2000. Although he played as regular player until 2002, his opportunity to play decreased in 2003 and he retired at the end of the 2003 season.

== Club statistics ==
Club performance			League		Cup		League Cup		Total	
Season	Club	League	Apps	Goals	Apps	Goals	Apps	Goals	Apps	Goals
Japan			League		Emperor's Cup		J.League Cup		Total	
1998	Mito HollyHock	Football League	27	0	3	0	-		30	0
1999	Mito HollyHock	Football League	21	0	3	0	-		24	0
2000	Mito HollyHock	J2 League	38	4	3	0	2	0	43	4
2001	Mito HollyHock	J2 League	21	0	2	0	2	0	25	0
2002	Mito HollyHock	J2 League	34	0	2	0	-		36	0
2003	Mito HollyHock	J2 League	10	0	0	0	-		10	0
Total			151	4	13	0	4	0	168	4
