= Yohei Takasu =

Japanese footballer

Yohei Takasu 高須 洋平
Personal information
- Full name: Yohei Takasu
- Date of birth: September 6, 1981 (age 45)
- Place of birth: Saitama, Japan
- Height: 1.72 m (5 ft 7 1/2 in)
- Position: Midfielder

Youth career
- 1997–1999: Kashima Antlers

Senior career*
Years	Team	Apps	(Gls)
2000–2001	Mito HollyHock	8	(0)
2002–2005	Thespa Kusatsu	48	(16)
2006–2007	Arte Takasaki	24	(2)
2008–2009	Tonan Maebashi		
Total		80	(18)
- * Club domestic league appearances and goals

Yohei Takasu (高須 洋平, Takasu Yohei; born September 6, 1981) is a former Japanese football player.

== Playing career ==
Takasu was born in Saitama on September 6, 1981. He joined newly was promoted to J2 League club, Mito HollyHock from Kashima Antlers youth team in 2000. Although he played several matches, he could hardly play in the match until 2001. In 2002, he moved to Prefectural Leagues club Thespa Kusatsu. He played many matches and scored many goals in 2003 and the club was promoted to Regional Leagues from 2003 and Japan Football League (JFL) from 2004. Although the club was promoted to J2 from 2005, his opportunity to play decreased for injury from 2004. In 2006, he moved to JFL club Arte Takasaki and played in 2 seasons. In 2008, he moved to Prefectural Leagues club Tonan Maebashi. He retired in 2009.

== Club statistics ==
Club performance			League		Cup		League Cup		Total	
Season	Club	League	Apps	Goals	Apps	Goals	Apps	Goals	Apps	Goals
Japan			League		Emperor's Cup		J.League Cup		Total	
2000	Mito HollyHock	J2 League	5	0	3	0	0	0	8	0
2001	Mito HollyHock	J2 League	3	0	2	0	1	0	6	0
2002	Thespa Kusatsu	Prefectural Leagues	11	6	-		-		11	6
2003	Thespa Kusatsu	Regional Leagues	8	8	0	0	-		8	8
2004	Thespa Kusatsu	Football League	13	2	0	0	-		13	2
2005	Thespa Kusatsu	J2 League	16	0	0	0	-		16	0
2006	Arte Takasaki	Football League	12	0	1	1	-		13	1
2007	Arte Takasaki	Football League	12	2	-		-		12	2
Total			80	18	6	1	1	0	87	19
