= Kazuaki Kamizono =

Japanese footballer

Kazuaki Kamizono 上園 和明
Personal information
- Full name: Kazuaki Kamizono
- Date of birth: November 28, 1981 (age 44)
- Place of birth: Kanagawa, Japan
- Height: 1.74 m (5 ft 8 1/2 in)
- Position: Midfielder

Youth career
- 1997–1999: Bellmare Hiratsuka

Senior career*
| Years | Team | Apps | (Gls) |
| 2000–2003 | Mito HollyHock | 70 | (2) |
| 2004–2010 | Kataller Toyama | 162 | (20) |
| Total | | 232 | (22) |
- * Club domestic league appearances and goals

Kazuaki Kamizono (上園 和明, Kamizono Kazuaki; born November 28, 1981) is a former Japanese football player.

== Playing career ==
Kamizono was born in Kanagawa Prefecture on November 28, 1981. He joined J2 League club Mito HollyHock from Bellmare Hiratsuka youth team in 2000. He debuted in 2001 and became a regular player from summer 2001. However he could hardly play in the match in 2003 and retired end of 2003 season. In July 2004, he returned to as player at Japan Football League club ALO's Hokuriku (later Kataller Toyama). He became a regular player and played many matches for a long time. The club was promoted to J2 League. However his opportunity to play decreased from 2009 and he retired end of 2010 season.

== Club statistics ==
| Club performance | | | League | | Cup | | League Cup | | Total | |
| Season | Club | League | Apps | Goals | Apps | Goals | Apps | Goals | Apps | Goals |
| Japan | | | League | | Emperor's Cup | | J.League Cup | | Total | |
|---|---|---|---|---|---|---|---|---|---|---|
| 2000 | Mito HollyHock | J2 League | 0 | 0 | 0 | 0 | 0 | 0 | 0 | 0 |
| 2001 | Mito HollyHock | J2 League | 25 | 1 | 1 | 1 | 0 | 0 | 26 | 2 |
| 2002 | Mito HollyHock | J2 League | 39 | 1 | 3 | 1 | - | | 42 | 2 |
| 2003 | Mito HollyHock | J2 League | 6 | 0 | 2 | 0 | - | | 8 | 0 |
| 2004 | ALO's Hokuriku | Football League | 12 | 5 | | | - | | 12 | 5 |
| 2005 | ALO's Hokuriku | Football League | 30 | 6 | 4 | 0 | - | | 34 | 6 |
| 2006 | ALO's Hokuriku | Football League | 23 | 3 | - | | - | | 23 | 3 |
| 2007 | ALO's Hokuriku | Football League | 30 | 0 | 2 | 1 | - | | 32 | 1 |
| 2008 | Kataller Toyama | Football League | 33 | 2 | 2 | 0 | - | | 35 | 2 |
| 2009 | Kataller Toyama | J2 League | 19 | 2 | 1 | 0 | - | | 20 | 2 |
| 2010 | Kataller Toyama | J2 League | 15 | 2 | 0 | 0 | - | | 15 | 2 |
| Total | | | 232 | 22 | 15 | 3 | 0 | 0 | 247 | 25 |
