= Takayoshi Ono =

Japanese footballer

Takayoshi Ono 小野 隆儀
Personal information
- Full name: Takayoshi Ono
- Date of birth: April 30, 1978 (age 48)
- Place of birth: Fukushima, Japan
- Height: 1.83 m (6 ft 0 in)
- Position: Forward

Youth career
- 1994–1996: Fukushima Higashi High School
- 1997–2000: University of Tsukuba

Senior career*
Years	Team	Apps	(Gls)
2001–2003	Mito HollyHock	93	(23)
2004–2010	FC Primeiro		
Total		93	(23)
- * Club domestic league appearances and goals

Takayoshi Ono (小野 隆儀, Ono Takayoshi; born April 30, 1978) is a former Japanese football player.

== Playing career ==
Ono was born in Fukushima Prefecture on April 30, 1978. After graduating from University of Tsukuba, he joined J2 League club Mito HollyHock in 2001. He played many matches as forward from first season. In 2002, he scored 14 goals which is top scorer in the club. However his opportunity to play decreased from summer 2003. In 2004, he moved to his local club FC Primeiro in Regional Leagues. He retired end of 2010 season.

== Career statistics ==
Appearances and goals by club, season and competition
Club	Season	League			Emperor's Cup		J.League Cup		Total	
Club	Season	Division	Apps	Goals	Apps	Goals	Apps	Goals	Apps	Goals
Mito HollyHock	2001	J2 League	28	2	2	0	1	0	31	2
Mito HollyHock	2002	J2 League	36	14	3	1	—		39	15
Mito HollyHock	2003	J2 League	29	7			—		29	7
Career total			93	23	5	1	1	0	99	24
