= Tsuyoshi Kaneko =

Japanese footballer

Tsuyoshi Kaneko 金子 剛
Personal information
- Full name: Tsuyoshi Kaneko
- Date of birth: April 8, 1983 (age 43)
- Place of birth: Utsunomiya, Tochigi, Japan
- Height: 1.83 m (6 ft 0 in)
- Position: Forward

Team information
- Current team: Tokyo Musashino City FC
- Number: 23

Youth career
- 1999–2001: Kanuma Higashi High School

Senior career*
Years	Team	Apps	(Gls)
2002–2005	Mito HollyHock	25	(3)
2004	→Grulla Morioka (loan)	10	(25)
2006–2007	Tochigi SC	15	(2)
2008–2009	Yokogawa Musashino	38	(8)
2014–	Tokyo Musashino City FC	70	(8)
- * Club domestic league appearances and goals as of end of 2018 season

Tsuyoshi Kaneko (金子 剛, Kaneko Tsuyoshi; born April 8, 1983) is a Japanese football player. He plays for Tokyo Musashino City FC.

== Playing career ==
Kaneko was born in Utsunomiya on April 8, 1983. After graduating from high school, he joined J2 League club Mito HollyHock in 2002. He got an opportunity to play from first season. In April 2004, he was loaned to Regional Leagues club Grulla Morioka with teammate Shogo Sakurai. He scored 25 goals in 10 matches. He returned to HollyHock in 2005. In 2006, he moved to his local club Tochigi SC in Japan Football League (JFL). However, he could not play many matches. In 2008, he moved to JFL club Yokogawa Musashino (later Tokyo Musashino City FC). Although he played many matches in 2008, he could not play many matches in 2009 and retired end of 2009 season. In 2014, he returned as player at Tokyo Musashino City FC.

== Club statistics ==
Club performance			League		Cup		Total	
Season	Club	League	Apps	Goals	Apps	Goals	Apps	Goals
Japan			League		Emperor's Cup		Total	
2002	Mito HollyHock	J2 League	2	0	0	0	2	0
2003	Mito HollyHock	J2 League	14	2	3	1	17	3
2004	Mito HollyHock	J2 League	0	0	0	0	0	0
Total			16	2	3	1	19	3
2004	Grulla Morioka	Regional Leagues	10	25	-		10	25
Total			10	25	-		10	25
2005	Mito HollyHock	J2 League	9	1	0	0	9	1
Total			9	1	0	0	9	1
2006	Tochigi SC	Football League	11	2	0	0	11	2
2007	Tochigi SC	Football League	4	0	0	0	4	0
Total			15	2	0	0	15	2
2008	Yokogawa Musashino	Football League	29	7	-		29	7
2009	Yokogawa Musashino	Football League	9	1	0	0	9	1
Total			38	8	0	0	38	8
2014	Tokyo Musashino City FC	Football League	20	4	-		20	4
2015	Tokyo Musashino City FC	Football League	23	2	-		23	2
2016	Tokyo Musashino City FC	Football League	12	2	-		12	2
2017	Tokyo Musashino City FC	Football League	12	0	-		12	0
2018	Tokyo Musashino City FC	Football League	3	0	-		3	0
Total			70	8	-		70	8
Career total			158	46	3	1	161	47
