= Kenji Hada =

Japanese footballer

Kenji Hada 秦 賢二
Personal information
- Full name: Kenji Hada
- Date of birth: June 27, 1981 (age 45)
- Place of birth: Hiroshima, Japan
- Height: 1.67 m (5 ft 5 1/2 in)
- Position: Midfielder

Youth career
- 1997–1999: Hiroshima Minami High School

Senior career*
| Years | Team | Apps | (Gls) |
| 2000–2002 | Nagoya Grampus Eight | 0 | (0) |
| 2002–2006 | Mito HollyHock | 141 | (4) |
| 2007–2010 | FC Ryukyu | 119 | (13) |
| 2011–2012 | MIO Biwako Shiga | 30 | (1) |
| 2013 | Okinawa Kaiho Bank | | |
| Total | | 290 | (18) |
- * Club domestic league appearances and goals

Kenji Hada (秦 賢二, Hada Kenji; born June 27, 1981) is a former Japanese football player.

== Playing career ==
Hada was born in Hiroshima Prefecture on June 27, 1981. After graduating from high school, he joined J1 League club Nagoya Grampus Eight in 2000. However he could not play at all in the match until 2002. In September 2002, he moved to J2 League club Mito HollyHock. He became a regular player in 2003 and played many matches as midfielder. However his opportunity to play decreased in 2006. In 2007, he moved to Japan Football League (JFL) club FC Ryukyu. He played as regular player until 2010. In 2011, he moved to JFL club MIO Biwako Shiga. He played many matches in 2011. However he could hardly play in the match in 2012. In 2013, he moved to Regional Leagues club Okinawa Kaiho Bank. He retired end of 2013 season.

== Club statistics ==
| Club performance | | | League | | Cup | | League Cup | | Total | |
| Season | Club | League | Apps | Goals | Apps | Goals | Apps | Goals | Apps | Goals |
| Japan | | | League | | Emperor's Cup | | J.League Cup | | Total | |
|---|---|---|---|---|---|---|---|---|---|---|
| 2000 | Nagoya Grampus Eight | J1 League | 0 | 0 | 0 | 0 | 0 | 0 | 0 | 0 |
| 2001 | Nagoya Grampus Eight | J1 League | 0 | 0 | 0 | 0 | 0 | 0 | 0 | 0 |
| 2002 | Nagoya Grampus Eight | J1 League | 0 | 0 | 0 | 0 | 0 | 0 | 0 | 0 |
| Total | | | 0 | 0 | 0 | 0 | 0 | 0 | 0 | 0 |
| 2002 | Mito HollyHock | J2 League | 6 | 0 | 0 | 0 | - | | 6 | 0 |
| 2003 | Mito HollyHock | J2 League | 38 | 0 | 3 | 1 | - | | 41 | 1 |
| 2004 | Mito HollyHock | J2 League | 30 | 2 | 0 | 0 | - | | 30 | 2 |
| 2005 | Mito HollyHock | J2 League | 40 | 2 | 2 | 0 | - | | 42 | 2 |
| 2006 | Mito HollyHock | J2 League | 27 | 0 | 0 | 0 | - | | 27 | 0 |
| Total | | | 141 | 4 | 5 | 1 | - | | 146 | 5 |
| 2007 | FC Ryukyu | Football League | 34 | 7 | - | | - | | 34 | 7 |
| 2008 | FC Ryukyu | Football League | 25 | 0 | - | | - | | 25 | 0 |
| 2009 | FC Ryukyu | Football League | 29 | 1 | - | | - | | 29 | 1 |
| 2010 | FC Ryukyu | Football League | 31 | 5 | 2 | 0 | - | | 33 | 5 |
| Total | | | 119 | 13 | 2 | 0 | - | | 2 | 0 |
| 2011 | MIO Biwako Shiga | Football League | 28 | 1 | - | | - | | 28 | 1 |
| 2012 | MIO Biwako Shiga | Football League | 2 | 0 | - | | - | | 2 | 0 |
| Total | | | 30 | 1 | - | | - | | 30 | 1 |
| Career total | | | 290 | 18 | 7 | 1 | 0 | 0 | 297 | 19 |
