= Masato Yamasaki =

Japanese footballer

Masato Yamasaki 山崎 理人
Personal information
- Full name: Masato Yamasaki
- Date of birth: April 7, 1980 (age 46)
- Place of birth: Kitakyushu, Fukuoka, Japan
- Height: 1.74 m (5 ft 8 1/2 in)
- Position: Midfielder

Youth career
- 1996–1998: Higashi Fukuoka High School

Senior career*
Years	Team	Apps	(Gls)
1999–2000	Kyoto Purple Sanga	0	(0)
2001–2003	Mito HollyHock	88	(9)
2005–2006	New Wave Kitakyushu		
Total		88	(9)
- * Club domestic league appearances and goals

Masato Yamasaki (山崎 理人, Yamasaki Masato; born April 7, 1980) is a former Japanese football player.

== Playing career ==
Yamasaki was born in Kitakyushu on April 7, 1980. After graduating from high school, he joined J1 League club Kyoto Purple Sanga in 1999. However he could not play at all in the match until 2000. In 2001, he moved to J2 League club Mito HollyHock. He debuted in August and played many matches as substitute after the debut. From summer 2002, he became a regular player as left side midfielder. Although he played many matches in 2003, he was released from the club end of 2003 season. After 1 year blank, he joined Regional Leagues club New Wave Kitakyushu based in his local in 2005. He played for the club in 2 seasons and retired end of 2006 season.

== Career statistics ==
Appearances and goals by club, season and competition
Club	Season	League			Emperor's Cup		J.League Cup		Total	
Club	Season	Division	Apps	Goals	Apps	Goals	Apps	Goals	Apps	Goals
Kyoto Purple Sanga	1999	J1 League	0	0	0	0	0	0	0	0
Kyoto Purple Sanga	2000	J1 League	0	0	0	0	0	0	0	0
Mito HollyHock	2001	J2 League	17	0	1	0	0	0	18	0
Mito HollyHock	2002	J2 League	34	6	2	0	—		36	6
Mito HollyHock	2003	J2 League	37	3	0	0	—		37	3
Career total			88	9	3	0	0	0	91	9
