= 1996 Kashima Antlers season =

Kashima Antlers
1996 season
- Chairman: Masaru Suzuki
- Manager: João Carlos
- Stadium: Kashima Soccer Stadium
- J.League: Champions
- Emperor's Cup: Quarterfinals
- J.League Cup: GL-B 5th
- Suntory Cup: Runners-up
- Top goalscorer: League: Yoshiyuki Hasegawa (12); All: Mazinho (17)
- Highest home attendance: 16,234 (vs Nagoya Grampus Eight, 6 November 1996)
- Lowest home attendance: 15,142 (vs Gamba Osaka, 11 May 1996); 10,643 (vs Urawa Red Diamonds, 20 April 1996, Akita Yabase Stadium)
- Average home league attendance: 15,386
Home colours	Away colours

1996 Kashima Antlers season

== Review and events ==
=== League results summary ===
Overall								Home						Away					
Pld	W	D	L	GF	GA	GD	Pts	W	D	L	GF	GA	GD	W	D	L	GF	GA	GD
30	21	0	9	61	34	+27	66	14	0	1	41	12	+29	7	0	8	20	22	−2

Source: J.LEAGUE OFFICIAL GUIDE 1997. ISBN 4-09-102329-0.

=== League results by round ===
Round	1	2	3	4	5	6	7	8	9	10	11	12	13	14	15	16	17	18	19	20	21	22	23	24	25	26	27	28	29	30
Ground	H	A	H	A	H	A	H	A	H	H	A	A	H	H	A	H	A	A	H	A	H	A	H	A	H	A	H	A	H	A
Result	W	W	W	L	W	W	W	L	W	W	L	L	W	W	L	W	W	W	W	W	L	L	W	L	W	W	W	W	W	L
Position	1	3	1	5	4	3	3	4	2	1	2	3	3	2	2	2	1	1	1	1	1	2	1	2	1	1	1	1	1	1

Source: J.LEAGUE OFFICIAL GUIDE 1997. ISBN 4-09-102329-0.
A = Away; H = Home; W = Win; D = Draw; L = Loss

== Competitions ==
Competitions	Position
J.League	Champions / 16 clubs
Emperor's Cup	Quarterfinals
J.League Cup	GL-B 5th / 8 clubs
Suntory Cup	Runners-up

== Domestic results ==
=== J.League ===
16 March 1996 1	Kashima Antlers	4–1	Shimizu S-Pulse	Kashima Soccer Stadium
15:04 JST (UTC+09)	Mazinho 0', 28'; Hasegawa 65', 75'	J. League	Sawanobori 10'	Attendance: 15,922; Referee: Zoran Petrović; Assistant referees: Noboru Ishiyama, Toshimitsu Yoshida; Fourth official: Masato Nogami

20 March 1996 2	Sanfrecce Hiroshima	1–2 (V-goal) (a.e.t.)	Kashima Antlers	Hiroshima Big Arch
16:05 JST (UTC+09)	Takagi 46'	J. League	Leonardo 73'; Hasegawa 117'	Attendance: 18,863; Referee: Fumikazu Shioyazono; Assistant referees: Takayoshi Kashino, Kazuhiko Matsumura; Fourth official: Kōji Ueno

23 March 1996 3	Kashima Antlers	5–1	Kyoto Purple Sanga	Kashima Soccer Stadium
15:00 JST (UTC+09)	Hasegawa 23', 89'; Kurosaki 39'; Mazinho 58'; Leonardo 63'	J. League	Matsuhashi 78'	Attendance: 15,224; Referee: Kiyoshi Ōta; Assistant referees: Toshiyuki Mayuzumi, Takao Onshi; Fourth official: Shigeyoshi Haga

30 March 1996 4	Bellmare Hiratsuka	1–0 (V-goal) (a.e.t.)	Kashima Antlers	Tokyo National Stadium
15:00 JST (UTC+09)	Noguchi 109'	J. League		Attendance: 23,748; Referee: Kenji Tanaka; Assistant referees: Takashi Kunori, Keiji Kamiara; Fourth official: Keizō Yamazaki

3 April 1996 5	Kashima Antlers	5–1	Kashiwa Reysol	Kashima Soccer Stadium
19:03 JST (UTC+09)	Mazinho 2'; Jorginho 20'; Muroi 33'; Hasegawa 61'; Kurosaki 65'	J. League	Edílson 81'	Attendance: 15,489; Referee: Naotsugu Fuse; Assistant referees: Masahiro Katagiri, Hisaharu Kitamura; Fourth official: Yoshimasa Onoguchi

6 April 1996 6	Avispa Fukuoka	2–4	Kashima Antlers	Hakatanomori Football Stadium
14:03 JST (UTC+09)	Troglio 35'; Nagai 64'	J. League	Hasegawa 21'; Kurosaki 23', 27'; Leonardo 28'	Attendance: 11,087; Referee: Zoran Petrović; Assistant referees: Naoki Esumi, Takayoshi Kashino; Fourth official: Ryōichi Imamura

13 April 1996 7	Kashima Antlers	3–1	Yokohama Marinos	Kashima Soccer Stadium
15:00 JST (UTC+09)	Hasegawa 17'; Leonardo 58'; Masuda 83'	J. League	Gorosito 23'	Attendance: 16,034; Referee: Tatsumi Ōno; Assistant referees: Kōji Minami, Keiji Kamiara; Fourth official: Kazushiro Miyajima

17 April 1996 8	Júbilo Iwata	2–2 (V-goal) (a.e.t.) (4–3 p)	Kashima Antlers	Júbilo Iwata Stadium
19:00 JST (UTC+09)	Nakayama 2'; Takeda 60'	J. League	Jorginho 0'; Leonardo 81'	Attendance: 14,165; Referee: Yoshimi Ogawa; Assistant referees: Naoyuki Mori, Kōji Taniuchi; Fourth official: Tōru Nagata
	Penalties
	(penalty scored) Fujita; (penalty scored) Vanenburg; (penalty scored) Nanami; (penalty missed) Endō; (penalty scored) Nakayama		(penalty missed) Jorginho; (penalty scored) Honda; (penalty scored) Hasegawa; (penalty missed) Manaka; (penalty scored) Leonardo

20 April 1996 9	Kashima Antlers	1–0	Urawa Red Diamonds	Akita Yabase Stadium
15:04 JST (UTC+09)	Kumagai 77'	J. League		Attendance: 10,643; Referee: Fumikazu Shioyazono; Assistant referees: Kazuaki Hamaguchi, Satoru Ishizawa; Fourth official: Masaki Asano

27 April 1996 10	Kashima Antlers	2–1	Verdy Kawasaki	Kashima Soccer Stadium
14:33 JST (UTC+09)	Masuda 67'; Hasegawa 75'	J. League	40' (o.g.)	Attendance: 15,702; Referee: Tetsuya Hamana; Assistant referees: Kazuya Yanagisawa, Kō Ōishi; Fourth official: Atsushi Fujigasaki

1 May 1996 11	Nagoya Grampus Eight	3–1	Kashima Antlers	Nagoya Mizuho Athletics Stadium
19:01 JST (UTC+09)	12' (o.g.); Stojković 17', 31'	J. League	Mazinho 38'	Attendance: 21,438; Referee: Piotr Werner; Assistant referees: Naoki Esumi, Hiroyuki Ōnishi; Fourth official: Tsutomu Suda

4 May 1996 12	JEF United Ichihara	3–2	Kashima Antlers	Tokyo National Stadium
14:03 JST (UTC+09)	Hašek 1', 27'; Hiroyama 14'	J. League	Kurosaki 2'; Leonardo 5'	Attendance: 40,016; Referee: Kenji Tanaka; Assistant referees: Yoshikazu Hiroshima, Toshimitsu Yoshida; Fourth official: Keizō Yamazaki

11 May 1996 13	Kashima Antlers	4–0	Gamba Osaka	Kashima Soccer Stadium
14:59 JST (UTC+09)	Mazinho 25'; Hasegawa 29'; 40' (o.g.); Sōma 66'	J. League		Attendance: 15,142; Referee: Kiyoshi Ōta; Assistant referees: Yū Nakamura, Masahiro Katagiri; Fourth official: Masato Nogami

15 May 1996 14	Kashima Antlers	1–0 (V-goal) (a.e.t.)	Cerezo Osaka	Kashima Soccer Stadium
19:04 JST (UTC+09)	Hasegawa 93'	J. League		Attendance: 15,213; Referee: Archundia; Assistant referees: Kazuaki Hamaguchi, Akihisa Makino; Fourth official: Masakatsu Isozaki

18 May 1996 15	Yokohama Flügels	1–1 (V-goal) (a.e.t.) (6–5 p)	Kashima Antlers	Tokyo National Stadium
19:04 JST (UTC+09)	Zinho 74'	J. League	Mazinho 53'	Attendance: 45,159; Referee: Zoran Petrović; Assistant referees: Naoyuki Mori, Susumu Takeda; Fourth official: Masatoshi Ueda
	Penalties
	(penalty scored) Zinho; (penalty scored) Maezono; (penalty scored) Yamaguchi; (penalty scored) Miura; (penalty scored) Harada; (penalty scored) Hattori		(penalty scored) Leonardo; (penalty scored) Jorginho; (penalty scored) Honda; (penalty scored) Kurosaki; (penalty scored) Mazinho; (penalty missed) Sōma

28 August 1996 16	Kashima Antlers	2–0	JEF United Ichihara	Kashima Soccer Stadium
18:59 JST (UTC+09)	Naitō 6'; Rodrigo 16'	J. League		Attendance: 16,046; Referee: Lim Kee Chong; Assistant referees: Satoru Ishizawa, Hitoshi Nakagomi; Fourth official: Masao Komada

31 August 1996 17	Gamba Osaka	0–1	Kashima Antlers	Expo '70 Commemorative Stadium
19:00 JST (UTC+09)		J. League	Yanagisawa 57'	Attendance: 8,665; Referee: Leslie Mottram; Assistant referees: Sōichirō Kaneko, Tōru Yamashiro; Fourth official: Tamotsu Ōnishi

7 September 1996 18	Cerezo Osaka	2–4	Kashima Antlers	Kobe Universiade Memorial Stadium
16:04 JST (UTC+09)	Kizawa 12'; Fukagawa 79'	J. League	Yanagisawa 35', 65'; Rodrigo 73', 82'	Attendance: 6,467; Referee: Kenji Tanaka; Assistant referees: Toshimitsu Yoshida, Takuji Fukazawa; Fourth official: Keiji Hayashi

14 September 1996 19	Kashima Antlers	2–1	Yokohama Flügels	Kashima Soccer Stadium
16:04 JST (UTC+09)	Yanagisawa 33'; Hasegawa 77'	J. League	Maezono 52'	Attendance: 15,435; Referee: Tōru Kamikawa; Assistant referees: Masahiro Katagiri, Akihisa Makino; Fourth official: Masakatsu Isozaki

21 September 1996 20	Shimizu S-Pulse	0–2	Kashima Antlers	Nihondaira Sports Stadium
15:03 JST (UTC+09)		J. League	Yanagisawa 34'; Kurosaki 72'	Attendance: 10,673; Referee: Bemard Saules; Assistant referees: Hideaki Harada, Kō Ōishi; Fourth official: Masakazu Hōjō

28 September 1996 21	Kashima Antlers	1–1 (V-goal) (a.e.t.) (8–9 p)	Sanfrecce Hiroshima	Kashima Soccer Stadium
15:04 JST (UTC+09)	Masuda 33'	J. League	Huistra 72'	Attendance: 15,975; Referee: Masayoshi Okada; Assistant referees: Noboru Ishiyama, Satoru Kawano; Fourth official: Michio Horie
	Penalties
	(penalty scored) Jorginho; (penalty scored) Hasegawa; (penalty scored) Oniki; (penalty missed) Manaka; (penalty scored) Rodrigo; (penalty scored) Akita; (penalty scored) Sōma; (penalty scored) Okuno; (penalty missed) Naitō; (penalty scored) Kumagai; (penalty missed) Furukawa		(penalty scored) Takagi; (penalty scored) Moriyasu; (penalty scored) Yoshida; (penalty scored) Kuwabara; (penalty missed) Huistra; (penalty scored) Kubo; (penalty scored) Yanagimoto; (penalty scored) Michiki; (penalty missed) Naitō; (penalty scored) Satō; (penalty scored) Maekawa

2 October 1996 22	Kyoto Purple Sanga	1–0	Kashima Antlers	Kyoto Nishikyogoku Stadium
19:04 JST (UTC+09)	Ta. Yamaguchi 44'	J. League		Attendance: 7,691; Referee: Kenji Tanaka; Assistant referees: Takayoshi Kashino, Kōji Minami; Fourth official: Yoshihisa Takahashi

5 October 1996 23	Kashima Antlers	2–0	Bellmare Hiratsuka	Kashima Soccer Stadium
15:00 JST (UTC+09)	Manaka 62', 86'	J. League		Attendance: 15,931; Referee: Zoran Petrović; Assistant referees: Hiroshi Fukuda, Masahiro Katagiri; Fourth official: Osamu Asano

16 October 1996 24	Kashiwa Reysol	1–0	Kashima Antlers	Hitachi Kashiwa Soccer Stadium
19:04 JST (UTC+09)	Sakai 11'	J. League		Attendance: 12,256; Referee: Bemard Saules; Assistant referees: Kō Ōishi, Susumu Takeda; Fourth official: Terunobu Kakinuma

19 October 1996 25	Kashima Antlers	3–1	Avispa Fukuoka	Kashima Soccer Stadium
15:00 JST (UTC+09)	Masuda 43'; Rodrigo 66'; Manaka 73'	J. League	Maradona 28'	Attendance: 15,976; Referee: Yasuhiro Matsuzaki; Assistant referees: Yū Nakamura, Takao Onshi; Fourth official: Yasushi Komuro

26 October 1996 26	Yokohama Marinos	0–1	Kashima Antlers	Yamagata Park Stadium
13:05 JST (UTC+09)		J. League	Mazinho 87'	Attendance: 16,110; Referee: Naotsugu Fuse; Assistant referees: Mitsuru Satō, Satoru Ishizawa; Fourth official: Masaki Abe

30 October 1996 27	Kashima Antlers	2–2 (V-goal) (a.e.t.) (4–3 p)	Júbilo Iwata	Kashima Soccer Stadium
19:02 JST (UTC+09)	Mazinho 40', 76'	J. League	Schillaci 1'; Fukunishi 55'	Attendance: 15,823; Referee: Zoran Petrović; Assistant referees: Kimio Izaki, Takuji Fukazawa; Fourth official: Masao Komada
	Penalties
	(penalty scored) Mazinho; (penalty scored) Honda; (penalty scored) Hasegawa; (penalty scored) Akita		(penalty scored) Hattori; (penalty scored) Nanami; (penalty missed) Nakayama; (penalty scored) Kudō; (penalty missed) Koga

2 November 1996 28	Urawa Red Diamonds	0–0 (V-goal) (a.e.t.) (4–5 p)	Kashima Antlers	Tokyo National Stadium
15:02 JST (UTC+09)		J. League		Attendance: 45,794; Referee: Bemard Saules; Assistant referees: Kazuhisa Osada, Hisaharu Kitamura; Fourth official: Tsutomu Anazawa
	Penalties
	(penalty scored) Hirose; (penalty missed) Buchwald; (penalty scored) Taguchi; (penalty scored) N. Ikeda; (penalty scored) Takita; (penalty missed) Bein		(penalty scored) Mazinho; (penalty scored) Honda; (penalty scored) Jorginho; (penalty scored) Hasegawa; (penalty missed) Rodrigo; (penalty scored) Akita

6 November 1996 29	Kashima Antlers	4–2	Nagoya Grampus Eight	Kashima Soccer Stadium
19:00 JST (UTC+09)	Manaka 29', 39'; Mazinho 65'; Sōma 66'	J. League	Torres 7'; Moriyama 85'	Attendance: 16,234; Referee: Leslie Mottram; Assistant referees: Toshiyuki Mayuzumi, Akihisa Makino; Fourth official: Kunihiro Ōtsuki

9 November 1996 30	Verdy Kawasaki	5–0	Kashima Antlers	Kawasaki Todoroki Stadium
14:34 JST (UTC+09)	Magrão 18', 45'; Nakamura 20'; K. Miura 37', 82'	J. League		Attendance: 21,074; Referee: Zoran Petrović; Assistant referees: Hiroshi Fukuda, Susumu Takeda; Fourth official: Mitsune Yamaguchi

=== Emperor's Cup ===
1st Round	bye

2nd Round	bye

17 November 1996 3rd Round	Kashima Antlers	2–0	Kansai University	Kashima Soccer Stadium
: JST (UTC+09)	Mazinho 33'; Jorginho 46'

23 December 1996 4th Round	Avispa Fukuoka	0–2	Kashima Antlers	Hakatanomori Football Stadium
: JST (UTC+09)			Mazinho 39'; Masuda 42'

26 December 1996 Quarterfinals	Verdy Kawasaki	2–1	Kashima Antlers	Tosu Stadium
: JST (UTC+09)	Argel 2'; K. Miura 25'		Mazinho 28'

=== J.League Cup ===
1 June 1996 GL-B-1-1	Shimizu S-Pulse	1–0	Kashima Antlers	Nihondaira Sports Stadium
16:05 JST (UTC+09)	Ōenoki 55'	J. League		Attendance: 15,039; Referee: Tōru Kamikawa; Assistant referees: Kazuya Yanagisawa, Yasushi Tsuchimoto; Fourth official: Naoki Uchiyama

5 June 1996 GL-B-1-2	Kashima Antlers	2–2 (2–3 agg.)	Shimizu S-Pulse	Kashima Soccer Stadium
19:00 JST (UTC+09)	Leonardo 35', 69'	J. League	Oliva 59'; Hasegawa 84'	Attendance: 15,330; Referee: Yasuhiro Matsuzaki; Assistant referees: Mitsuru Satō, Takao Onshi; Fourth official: Hiroshi Kiuchi

8 June 1996 GL-B-2-1	Avispa Fukuoka	0–0	Kashima Antlers	Hakatanomori Football Stadium
18:30 JST (UTC+09)		J. League		Attendance: 9,125; Referee: Fumikazu Shioyazono; Assistant referees: Takashi Kunori, Satoru Kawano; Fourth official: Ryōichi Imamura

12 June 1996 GL-B-2-2	Kashima Antlers	2–0 (2–0 agg.)	Avispa Fukuoka	Kashima Soccer Stadium
19:00 JST (UTC+09)	Yanagisawa 48'; Leonardo 82'	J. League		Attendance: 14,915; Referee: Tōru Kamikawa; Assistant referees: Hiroshi Fukuda, Kō Ōishi; Fourth official: Masahiro Kaneda

15 June 1996 GL-B-3-1	Cerezo Osaka	0–2	Kashima Antlers	Osaka Nagai No.2 Stadium
19:00 JST (UTC+09)		J. League	Leonardo 4'; Kurosaki 43'	Attendance: 9,978; Referee: Hiroyuki Umemoto; Assistant referees: Sōichirō Kaneko, Hiroyuki Izumi; Fourth official: Tsuyoshi Miyake

19 June 1996 GL-B-3-2	Kashima Antlers	0–3 (2–3 agg.)	Cerezo Osaka	Kashima Soccer Stadium
19:00 JST (UTC+09)		J. League	Manoel 6'; Nishizawa 19'; Yokoyama 89'	Attendance: 15,292; Referee: Piotr Werner; Assistant referees: Kenichi Koshiyama, Kimio Izaki; Fourth official: Kazuhiko Kumagai

22 June 1996 GL-B-4-1	Kashima Antlers	2–0	Nagoya Grampus Eight	Kashima Soccer Stadium
18:02 JST (UTC+09)	Kurosaki 6'; Mazinho 30'	J. League		Attendance: 15,612; Referee: Kenji Tanaka; Assistant referees: Hisaharu Kitamura, Keiji Kamiara; Fourth official: Shigemi Tominaga

26 June 1996 GL-B-4-2	Nagoya Grampus Eight	0–2 (0–4 agg.)	Kashima Antlers	Nagoya Mizuho Athletics Stadium
19:01 JST (UTC+09)		J. League	Leonardo 26'; Masuda 89'	Attendance: 19,929; Referee: Zoran Petrović; Assistant referees: Sōichirō Kaneko, Tōru Yamashiro; Fourth official: Tsuyoshi Ogura

29 June 1996 GL-B-5-1	Verdy Kawasaki	1–1	Kashima Antlers	Kawasaki Todoroki Stadium
19:00 JST (UTC+09)	Argel 78'	J. League	Ishii 29'	Attendance: 22,874; Referee: Keiichi Sunakawa; Assistant referees: Takashi Kunori, Kimio Izaki; Fourth official: Katsuhiro Mori

3 July 1996 GL-B-5-2	Kashima Antlers	1–1 (2–2 agg.)	Verdy Kawasaki	Kashima Soccer Stadium
19:01 JST (UTC+09)	Muroi 65'	J. League	Nunobe 57'	Attendance: 15,594; Referee: Fumikazu Shioyazono; Assistant referees: Yū Nakamura, Takao Onshi; Fourth official: Naoki Ishikawa

10 August 1996 GL-B-6-1	Kashima Antlers	1–1	JEF United Ichihara	Kashima Soccer Stadium
18:00 JST (UTC+09)	Kurosaki 61'	J. League	Jō 49'	Attendance: 15,436; Referee: Kazuo Kakihana; Assistant referees: Kōji Taniuchi, Susumu Takeda; Fourth official: Atsushi Fujigasaki

14 August 1996 GL-B-6-2	JEF United Ichihara	1–1 (2–2 agg.)	Kashima Antlers	Ichihara Stadium
19:01 JST (UTC+09)	Hašek 21'	J. League	Mazinho 14'	Attendance: 11,635; Referee: Kiyoshi Ōta; Assistant referees: Toshiyuki Mayuzumi, Masahiro Katagiri; Fourth official: Katsuhiko Takayama

17 August 1996 GL-B-7-1	Kashima Antlers	1–1	Yokohama Flügels	Kashima Soccer Stadium
18:01 JST (UTC+09)	Jorginho 88'	J. League	Satsukawa 44'	Attendance: 15,736; Referee: Naotsugu Fuse; Assistant referees: Tetsu Karakida, Kō Ōishi; Fourth official: Toshio Itō

21 August 1996 GL-B-7-2	Yokohama Flügels	1–1 (2–2 agg.)	Kashima Antlers	Yokohama Mitsuzawa Football Stadium
19:03 JST (UTC+09)	Hattori 5'	J. League	Oniki 60'	Attendance: 11,186; Referee: Kazuo Kakihana; Assistant referees: Kenichi Koshiyama, Takashi Aoki; Fourth official: Michio Nakahara

=== Suntory Cup ===
13 November 1996 Semifinals	Kashima Antlers	1–1 (V-goal) (a.e.t.) (4–2 p)	Verdy Kawasaki	Kashima Soccer Stadium
19:04 JST (UTC+09)	Mazinho 9'	J. League	K. Miura 70'	Attendance: 16,081; Referee: Masayoshi Okada; Assistant referees: Keiji Kamiara, Toshimitsu Yoshida; Fourth official: Takao Onshi
	Penalties
	(penalty scored) Mazinho; (penalty scored) Hasegawa; (penalty scored) Honda; (penalty scored) Rodrigo		(penalty scored) K. Miura; (penalty missed) Bismarck; (penalty scored) Kitazawa; (penalty missed) Y. Miura

20 November 1996 Final	Nagoya Grampus Eight	1–0 (V-goal) (a.e.t.)	Kashima Antlers	Tokyo National Stadium
19:05 JST (UTC+09)	Stojković 110'	J. League		Attendance: 25,017; Referee: Leslie Mottram; Assistant referees: Morihisa Yamaguchi, Noboru Ishiyama; Fourth official: Yasuhiro Matsuzaki

== Player statistics ==
No.	Pos	Nat	Player	Total		J.League		Emperor's Cup		J.League Cup		Suntory Cup	
No.	Pos	Nat	Player	Apps	Goals	Apps	Goals	Apps	Goals	Apps	Goals	Apps	Goals
	GK	(Japan) JPN	Masaaki Furukawa	24	0	15	0	3	0	4	0	2	0
	GK	(Japan) JPN	Yōhei Satō	25	0	15	0	0	0	10	0	0	0
	GK	(Japan) JPN	Hideaki Ozawa	0	0	0	0	0	0	0	0	0	0
	GK	(Japan) JPN	Tomoya Ichikawa	0	0	0	0	0	0	0	0	0	0
	DF	(Brazil) BRA	Mozer	2	0	2	0	0	0	0	0	0	0
	DF	(Japan) JPN	Naruyuki Naitō	44	1	30	1	3	0	9	0	2	0
	DF	(Japan) JPN	Ryōsuke Okuno	37	0	29	0	3	0	3	0	2	0
	DF	(Japan) JPN	Eiji Gaya	3	0	1	0	0	0	2	0	0	0
	DF	(Japan) JPN	Yutaka Akita	25	0	16	0	3	0	4	0	2	0
	DF	(Japan) JPN	Naoki Soma	49	2	30	2	3	0	14	0	2	0
	DF	(Japan) JPN	Ichiei Muroi	28	2	14	1	0	0	14	1	0	0
	DF	(Japan) JPN	Masafumi Mizuki	0	0	0	0	0	0	0	0	0	0
	DF	(Japan) JPN	Masaki Ogawa	16	0	6	0	0	0	10	0	0	0
	DF	(Japan) JPN	Tomohiko Ikeuchi	0	0	0	0	0	0	0	0	0	0
	MF	(Brazil) BRA	Jorginho	42	4	26	2	1	1	13	1	2	0
	MF	(Japan) JPN	Masatada Ishii	11	1	1	0	0	0	10	1	0	0
	MF	(Japan) JPN	Yasuto Honda	47	0	29	0	3	0	13	0	2	0
	MF	(Brazil) BRA	Leonardo	22	11	12	6	0	0	10	5	0	0
	MF	(Japan) JPN	Satoshi Koga	0	0	0	0	0	0	0	0	0	0
	MF	(Japan) JPN	Tadatoshi Masuda	47	6	29	4	3	1	13	1	2	0
	MF	(Japan) JPN	Tōru Oniki	18	1	11	0	2	0	3	1	2	0
	MF	(Japan) JPN	Toshiyuki Abe	4	0	0	0	0	0	4	0	0	0
	MF	(Japan) JPN	Taijirō Kurita	4	0	3	0	1	0	0	0	0	0
	MF	(Japan) JPN	Kōji Kumagai	13	1	9	1	0	0	4	0	0	0
	FW	(Brazil) BRA	Mazinho	37	17	19	11	3	3	13	2	2	1
	FW	(Japan) JPN	Hisashi Kurosaki	36	9	19	6	2	0	14	3	1	0
	FW	(Japan) JPN	Yoshiyuki Hasegawa	40	12	25	12	3	0	11	0	1	0
	FW	(Japan) JPN	Yasuo Manaka	30	5	21	5	3	0	4	0	2	0
	FW	(Japan) JPN	Kenichi Hashimoto	0	0	0	0	0	0	0	0	0	0
	FW	(Japan) JPN	Takayuki Suzuki	1	0	1	0	0	0	0	0	0	0
	FW	(Japan) JPN	Tomoyuki Hirase	0	0	0	0	0	0	0	0	0	0
	FW	(Japan) JPN	Atsushi Yanagisawa	15	6	8	5	1	0	6	1	0	0
	GK	(Japan) JPN	Daijirō Takakuwa †	0	0	0	0	0	0	0	0	0	0
	DF	(Brazil) BRA	Rodrigo †	19	4	14	4	3	0	0	0	2	0
	FW	(Brazil) BRA	Carbone †	2	0	2	0	0	0	0	0	0	0

- † player(s) joined the team after the opening of this season.

== Transfers ==
In:

No.	Pos.	Nation	Player
—	DF	JPN	Tomohiko Ikeuchi (from Muroran Otani High School)
—	FW	JPN	Tomoyuki Hirase (from Kagoshima Jitsugyo High School)
—	FW	JPN	Atsushi Yanagisawa (from Toyama Daiichi High School)

Out:

No.	Pos.	Nation	Player
—	DF	JPN	Shunzō Ōno (to Kyoto Purple Sanga)
—	DF	JPN	Kenichi Serata (to Cerezo Osaka)
—	FW	JPN	Kōji Takeda (to Fukushima FC)
—	FW	JPN	Masaaki Ueki (to Fukushima FC)

== Transfers during the season ==
=== In ===
- (Japan) Daijirō Takakuwa (from Yokohama Marinos)
- (Brazil) Rodrigo Fabiano Mendes (from Grêmio on August)
- (Brazil) Rodrigo José Carbone (on September)

=== Out ===
- (Brazil) Mozer (on May)
- (Brazil) Leonardo (on July)

== Awards ==
- J.League Most Valuable Player: (Brazil) Jorginho
- J.League Best XI: (Japan) Naoki Soma, (Brazil) Jorginho

== Other pages ==
- (in Japanese) J. League official site
- (in Japanese) Kashima Antlers official site
