= Taijiro Kurita =

Japanese footballer

Taijiro Kurita 栗田 泰次郎
Personal information
- Full name: Taijiro Kurita
- Date of birth: March 3, 1975 (age 51)
- Place of birth: Shizuoka, Japan
- Height: 1.81 m (5 ft 11 1/2 in)
- Position: Midfielder

Youth career
- 1990–1992: Shizuoka Gakuen High School

Senior career*
| Years | Team | Apps | (Gls) |
| 1993–1997 | Kashima Antlers | 29 | (0) |
| 1998 | Kyoto Purple Sanga | 9 | (0) |
| 1999 | Consadole Sapporo | 8 | (1) |
| 2000 | Shimizu S-Pulse | 0 | (0) |
| 2001 | Yokohama FC | 16 | (0) |
| 2002–2005 | Mito HollyHock | 138 | (2) |
| 2006–2008 | FC Ryukyu | 82 | (2) |
| Total | | 282 | (5) |
Medal record
Kashima Antlers
| Winner | J1 League | 1996 |
| Runner-up | J1 League | 1993 |
| Runner-up | J1 League | 1997 |
| Winner | J.League Cup | 1997 |
| Winner | Emperor's Cup | 1997 |
| Runner-up | Emperor's Cup | 1993 |
Shimizu S-Pulse
| Runner-up | Emperor's Cup | 2000 |
- * Club domestic league appearances and goals

Taijiro Kurita (栗田 泰次郎, Kurita Taijiro; born March 3, 1975) is a former Japanese football player.

== Playing career ==
Kurita was born in Shizuoka Prefecture on March 3, 1975. After graduating from Shizuoka Gakuen High School, he joined Kashima Antlers in 1993. Although he played as defensive midfielder, he could not play many matches behind Yasuto Honda and Jorginho. From 1998, he played for Kyoto Purple Sanga (1998), Consadole Sapporo (1999), Shimizu S-Pulse (2000) and Yokohama FC (2001). In 2002, he moved to Mito HollyHock and played as regular player until 2004. In 2005, his opportunity to play decreased. In 2006, he moved to Japan Football League club FC Ryukyu. He played as regular player until 2007. His opportunity to play decreased in 2008 and he retired end of 2008 season.

== Club statistics ==
| Club performance | | | League | | Cup | | League Cup | | Total | |
| Season | Club | League | Apps | Goals | Apps | Goals | Apps | Goals | Apps | Goals |
| Japan | | | League | | Emperor's Cup | | League Cup | | Total | |
|---|---|---|---|---|---|---|---|---|---|---|
| 1993 | Kashima Antlers | J1 League | 0 | 0 | 0 | 0 | 0 | 0 | 0 | 0 |
| 1994 | Kashima Antlers | J1 League | 3 | 0 | 1 | 0 | 0 | 0 | 4 | 0 |
| 1995 | Kashima Antlers | J1 League | 13 | 0 | 0 | 0 | - | | 13 | 0 |
| 1996 | Kashima Antlers | J1 League | 3 | 0 | 1 | 0 | 0 | 0 | 4 | 0 |
| 1997 | Kashima Antlers | J1 League | 10 | 0 | 0 | 0 | 6 | 0 | 16 | 0 |
| 1998 | Kyoto Purple Sanga | J1 League | 9 | 0 | 1 | 0 | 3 | 0 | 13 | 0 |
| 1999 | Consadole Sapporo | J2 League | 8 | 1 | 0 | 0 | 1 | 0 | 9 | 1 |
| 2000 | Shimizu S-Pulse | J1 League | 0 | 0 | 0 | 0 | 1 | 0 | 1 | 0 |
| 2001 | Yokohama FC | J2 League | 16 | 0 | 0 | 0 | 2 | 0 | 18 | 0 |
| 2002 | Mito HollyHock | J2 League | 42 | 2 | 3 | 0 | - | | 45 | 2 |
| 2003 | Mito HollyHock | J2 League | 44 | 0 | 3 | 1 | - | | 47 | 1 |
| 2004 | Mito HollyHock | J2 League | 34 | 0 | 2 | 0 | - | | 36 | 0 |
| 2005 | Mito HollyHock | J2 League | 18 | 0 | 1 | 0 | - | | 19 | 0 |
| 2006 | FC Ryukyu | Football League | 33 | 1 | 2 | 1 | - | | 35 | 2 |
| 2007 | FC Ryukyu | Football League | 33 | 1 | - | | - | | 33 | 1 |
| 2008 | FC Ryukyu | Football League | 16 | 0 | - | | - | | 16 | 0 |
| Career total | | | 282 | 5 | 14 | 2 | 13 | 0 | 309 | 7 |
