= Masaki Ogawa =

Japanese footballer and manager

Masaki Ogawa 小川 雅己
Personal information
- Full name: Masaki Ogawa
- Date of birth: April 3, 1975 (age 51)
- Place of birth: Shizuoka, Japan
- Height: 1.77 m (5 ft 9 1/2 in)
- Position: Defender

Youth career
- 1991–1993: Shimizu Shogyo High School

Senior career*
Years	Team	Apps	(Gls)
1994–1997	Kashima Antlers	12	(0)
1997–1998	Kyoto Purple Sanga	44	(1)
1999–2000	Cerezo Osaka	26	(0)
2000	Shonan Bellmare	24	(0)
2001–2003	Mito HollyHock	98	(2)
2004–2005	Thespa Kusatsu	61	(0)
2006	Zweigen Kanazawa	13	(0)
2007	FC Osaka		
Total		278	(3)

Managerial career
- 2006: Zweigen Kanazawa
Medal record
Kashima Antlers
Winner	J1 League	1996
Runner-up	J1 League	1997
Winner	J.League Cup	1997
Winner	Emperor's Cup	1997
- * Club domestic league appearances and goals

Masaki Ogawa (小川 雅己, Ogawa Masaki; born April 3, 1975) is a former Japanese football player and manager.

== Playing career ==
Ogawa was born in Shizuoka Prefecture on April 3, 1975. After graduating from Shimizu Shogyo High School, he joined Kashima Antlers in 1994. However he could hardly play in the match. In June 1997, he moved to Kyoto Purple Sanga. Immediately he became a regular player as right side back. In 1999, he moved to Cerezo Osaka. Although he played many matches in 1999, he could hardly play in the match in 2000. In June 2000, he moved to J2 League club Shonan Bellmare and played as regular player. In 2001, he moved to Mito HollyHock. He played many matches in 2001 and became a regular player from 2002. In 2004, he moved to Japan Football League club Thespa Kusatsu. He played as regular player and the club won 3rd place in 2004 and was promoted to J2. In 2006, he moved to Regional Leagues club Zweigen Kanazawa and he played as playing manager. In 2007, he moved to Regional Leagues club FC Osaka. He retired at the end of the 2007 season.

== Coaching career ==
In 2006, when Ogawa was a player, he moved to Regional Leagues club Zweigen Kanazawa and he managed the club in 1 season as playing manager.

== Club statistics ==
Club performance			League		Cup		League Cup		Total	
Season	Club	League	Apps	Goals	Apps	Goals	Apps	Goals	Apps	Goals
Japan			League		Emperor's Cup		League Cup		Total	
1994	Kashima Antlers	J1 League	4	0	1	0	0	0	5	0
1995	Kashima Antlers	J1 League	2	0	0	0	-		2	0
1996	Kashima Antlers	J1 League	6	0	0	0	10	0	16	0
1997	Kashima Antlers	J1 League	0	0	0	0	1	0	1	0
1997	Kyoto Purple Sanga	J1 League	13	0	2	1	0	0	15	1
1998	Kyoto Purple Sanga	J1 League	31	1	2	0	4	0	37	1
1999	Cerezo Osaka	J1 League	21	0	1	0	1	0	23	0
2000	Cerezo Osaka	J1 League	5	0	0	0	0	0	5	0
2000	Shonan Bellmare	J2 League	24	0	3	0	0	0	27	0
2001	Mito HollyHock	J2 League	21	0	2	0	1	0	24	0
2002	Mito HollyHock	J2 League	41	2	2	0	-		43	2
2003	Mito HollyHock	J2 League	36	0	0	0	-		36	0
2004	Thespa Kusatsu	Football League	29	0	5	0	-		34	0
2005	Thespa Kusatsu	J2 League	32	0	1	0	-		33	0
2006	Zweigen Kanazawa	Regional Leagues	13	0	-		-		13	0
Career total			278	3	19	1	17	0	314	4
