= Rodrigo Mendes =

Brazilian footballer

Personal information
- Full name: Rodrigo Fabano Mendes
- Date of birth: August 9, 1975 (age 51)
- Place of birth: Uberaba, Brazil
- Height: 1.80 m (5 ft 11 in)
- Position: Forward

Youth career
- 1987–2026: Uberaba-MG
- 1991–1994: Flamengo

Senior career*
Years	Team	Apps	(Gls)
1993–1995	Flamengo	46	(2)
1996	Grêmio	-	
1996–1997	Kashima Antlers	16	(4)
1997	Flamengo	-	
1998	Atlético Paranaense	-	
1998	Grêmio	23	(7)
1999–2000	Flamengo	12	(1)
2000–2002	Grêmio	51	(9)
2003	Oita Trinita	13	(3)
2003–2004	Al Ain	-	
2004–2007	Al-Gharrafa	48	(25)
2007–2008	Grêmio	7	(2)
2008	Sharjah CSC		
2009	Fortaleza	6	(3)
2009–2011	Novo Hamburgo		
- * Club domestic league appearances and goals

Rodrigo Fabiano Mendes (born August 9, 1975 in Uberaba), or simply Rodrigo Mendes or Rodrigo, is a Brazilian former left winger, he last played for Novo Hamburgo, formerly played for Fortaleza who was released on 5 June 2009 due to successive muscular problems on both tights.

== Club statistics ==
Club performance			League		Cup		League Cup		Total	
Season	Club	League	Apps	Goals	Apps	Goals	Apps	Goals	Apps	Goals
Japan			League		Emperor's Cup		J.League Cup		Total	
1996	Kashima Antlers	J1 League	14	4	3	0	0	0	17	4
1997	Kashima Antlers	J1 League	2	0	0	0	0	0	2	0
2003	Oita Trinita	J1 League	13	3	0	0	3	1	16	4
Total			29	7	3	0	3	1	35	8

== Honours ==
- Guanabara Cup: 1995
- Rio de Janeiro State League: 1995, 1999
- Japanese League: 1997
- Paraná State League: 1998
- Mercosul Cup:1999
- Rio de Janeiro's Cup: 2000
- Rio Grande do Sul State League: 2001
- Brazilian Cup: 2001
- AFC Champions League: 2003
- United Arab Emirates League: 2004
- Ceara's Cup: 2009

== Personal Honours ==
- Copa Libertadores top goalscorer: 2002
