= Rodrigo Carbone =

Brazilian footballer

Personal information
- Full name: Rodrigo José Carbone
- Date of birth: 17 March 1974 (age 52)
- Place of birth: Rio de Janeiro, Brazil
- Height: 1.79 m (5 ft 10 1/2 in)
- Position: Forward

Senior career*
Years	Team	Apps	(Gls)
- Corinthians
1994–1996	Fluminense		
1996	Kashima Antlers	2	(0)
1997	Fluminense		
1997–1998	ŁKS Łódź	28	(9)
1999	Jeonnam Dragons	8	(1)
2000	Xiamen Blue Lions		
- * Club domestic league appearances and goals

Rodrigo José Carbone (born 17 March 1974) is a Brazilian former professional footballer who played as a forward.

== Club statistics ==
Club performance			League		Cup		League Cup		Total	
Club	Season	League	Apps	Goals	Apps	Goals	Apps	Goals	Apps	Goals
Kashima Antlers	1996	J1 League	2	0	0	0	0	0	2	0
Total			2	0	0	0	0	0	2	0

== Honours ==
ŁKS Łódź

- Ekstraklasa: 1997–98
