= Leandro Perez =

Brazilian footballer

Personal information
- Full name: Leandro Tomaz Perez
- Date of birth: July 29, 1979 (age 47)
- Place of birth: Penápolis, Brazil
- Height: 1.85 m (6 ft 1 in)
- Position: Midfielder

Senior career*
Years	Team	Apps	(Gls)
2000	Mito HollyHock	16	(1)
2003	Sampaio Corrêa		
2004	União Bandeirante		
2005	União Rondonópolis		
2006	Ceilândia		
2007	Inter de Limeira		
2008	Jaciara		
2008–2010	Feirense	17+	(0+)
2011–2013	Penapolense	60	(3)
- * Club domestic league appearances and goals

Leandro Tomaz Perez (born July 29, 1979) is a former Brazilian football player.

== Club statistics ==
Club performance			League		Cup		League Cup		Total	
Season	Club	League	Apps	Goals	Apps	Goals	Apps	Goals	Apps	Goals
Japan			League		Emperor's Cup		J.League Cup		Total	
2000	Mito HollyHock	J2 League	16	1			0	0	16	1
Total			16	1	0	0	0	0	16	1
