= Yoshio Kitajima =

Japanese footballer

Yoshio Kitajima 北島 義生
Personal information
- Full name: Yoshio Kitajima
- Date of birth: October 29, 1975 (age 51)
- Place of birth: Joso, Ibaraki, Japan
- Height: 1.80 m (5 ft 11 in)
- Position: Midfielder

Senior career*
Years	Team	Apps	(Gls)
1996	Guangdong Hongyuan	3	(0)
1997	Oita Trinity	5	(0)
1998–2005	Mito HollyHock	129	(3)
1999	→Ventforet Kofu (loan)	6	(0)
2006–2008	Shonan Bellmare	54	(3)
Total		197	(6)
- * Club domestic league appearances and goals

Yoshio Kitajima (北島 義生, Kitajima Yoshio; born October 29, 1975) is a former Japanese football player.

== Playing career ==
Kitajima was born in Joso on October 29, 1975. Through the Chinese club Guangdong Hongyuan, he joined the Japan Football League (JFL) club Oita Trinity in 1997. However he did not play in many matches. In 1998, he moved to the JFL club Mito HollyHock based in his local Ibaraki Prefecture. However he did not play in any matches. In 1999, he moved to the newly promoted J2 League club, Ventforet Kofu on loan. However he did not play much. In 2000, he returned to Mito HollyHock, which had just been promoted to J2. He became a regular player as a defensive midfielder and played often. In 2006, he moved to the J2 club Shonan Bellmare. He played often until 2007. However his opportunity to play decreased in 2008 and he retired at the end of the 2008 season.

== Career statistics ==
Appearances and goals by club, season and competition
Club	Season	League			Emperor's Cup		J.League Cup		Total	
Club	Season	Division	Apps	Goals	Apps	Goals	Apps	Goals	Apps	Goals
Oita Trinity	1997	Football League	5	0	0	0	—		5	0
Mito HollyHock	1998	Football League	0	0	0	0	—		0	0
Ventforet Kofu	1999	J2 League	6	0	1	0	0	0	7	0
Mito HollyHock	2000	J2 League	26	1	3	0	0	0	29	1
Mito HollyHock	2001	J2 League	36	1	3	1	1	0	40	2
Mito HollyHock	2002	J2 League	38	1	2	0	—		40	1
Mito HollyHock	2003	J2 League	0	0	2	0	—		2	0
Mito HollyHock	2004	J2 League	27	0	1	0	—		28	0
Mito HollyHock	2005	J2 League	2	0	1	0	—		3	0
Shonan Bellmare	2006	J2 League	17	1	1	0	—		18	1
Shonan Bellmare	2007	J2 League	33	2	0	0	—		33	2
Shonan Bellmare	2008	J2 League	4	0	0	0	—		4	0
Career total			194	6	14	1	1	0	209	7
