= Shigeo Onoue =

Japanese footballer

Shigeo Onoue 尾上 恵生
Personal information
- Full name: Shigeo Onoue
- Date of birth: July 15, 1976 (age 50)
- Place of birth: Hiroshima, Japan
- Height: 1.71 m (5 ft 7 1/2 in)
- Position: Forward

Youth career
- 1992–1994: Gamba Osaka
- 1995–1998: University of Tsukuba

Senior career*
Years	Team	Apps	(Gls)
1999–2000	Mito HollyHock	38	(10)
Total		38	(10)
- * Club domestic league appearances and goals

Shigeo Onoue (尾上 恵生, Onoue Shigeo; born July 15, 1976) is a former Japanese football player.

== Playing career ==
Onoue was born in Hiroshima Prefecture on July 15, 1976. After graduating from University of Tsukuba, he joined Japan Football League club Mito HollyHock in 1999. He played many matches as forward and scored 10 goals. The club was also promoted to J2 League from 2000. Although he played many matches in 2000, he could not score a goal and retired end of 2000 season.

== Career statistics ==
Appearances and goals by club, season and competition
Club	Season	League			Emperor's Cup		J.League Cup		Total	
Club	Season	Division	Apps	Goals	Apps	Goals	Apps	Goals	Apps	Goals
Mito HollyHock	1999	Football League	17	10	3	0	—		20	10
Mito HollyHock	2000	J2 League	21	0	1	0	0	0	22	0
Career total			38	10	4	0	0	0	42	10
