= Hitachi Stadium =

Athletic stadium in Hitachi, Ibaraki, Japan

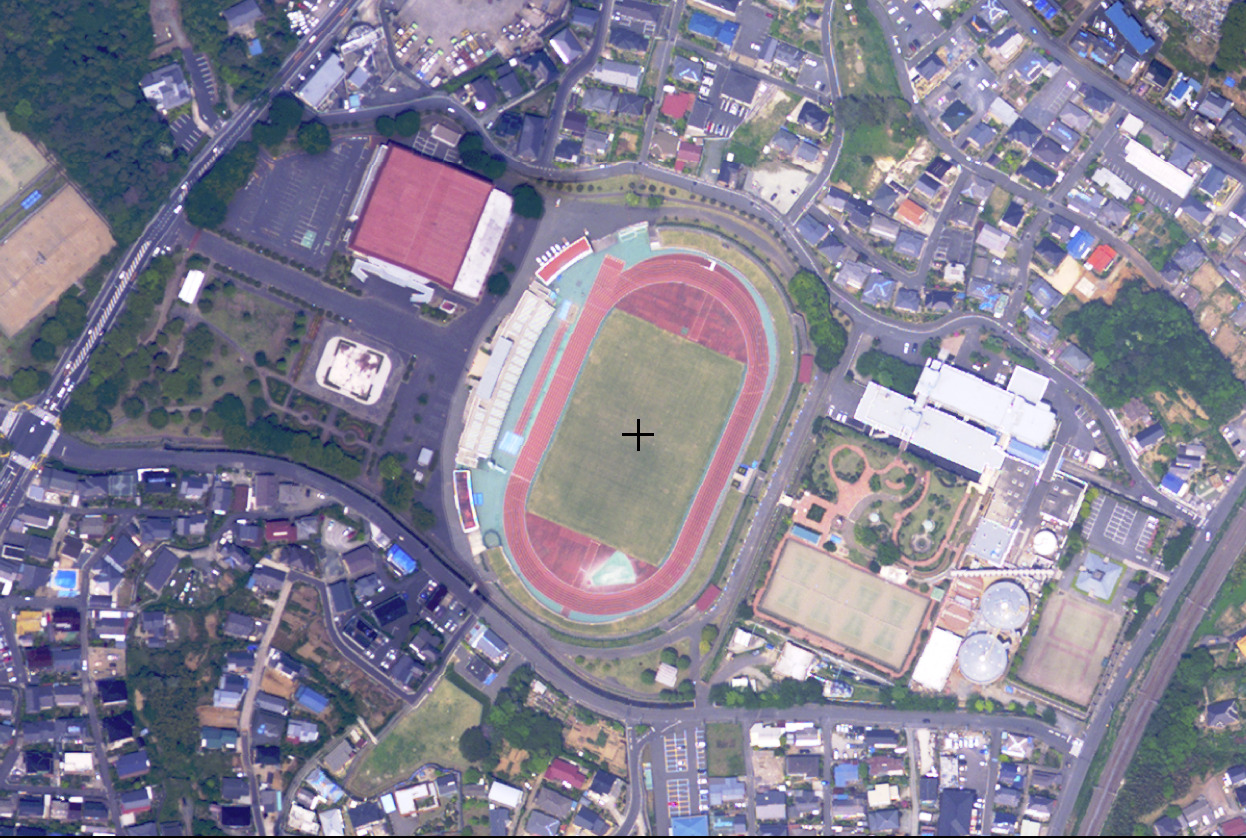
- Interactive map of Hitachi Stadium
- Location: Hitachi, Ibaraki, Japan
- Coordinates: 36°34′32.7″N 140°38′55.1″E
- Owner: Hitachi City
- Capacity: 8,464

Construction
- Opened: 1974

Tenant
- Mito HollyHock

Hitachi Stadium (日立市民運動公園陸上競技場, Hitachi shimin undōkōen rikujō kyōgiba) is an athletic stadium in Hitachi, Ibaraki, Japan.

The stadium was constructed for the 1974 National Sports Festival of Japan, which was held in Ibaraki Prefecture, and was used for soccer events.

It was one of the home stadium of football club Mito Hollyhock in 2000.
