= Hitachinaka City Stadium =

Athletic stadium in Hitachinaka, Japan

Coordinates: 36°23′31″N 140°35′10″E

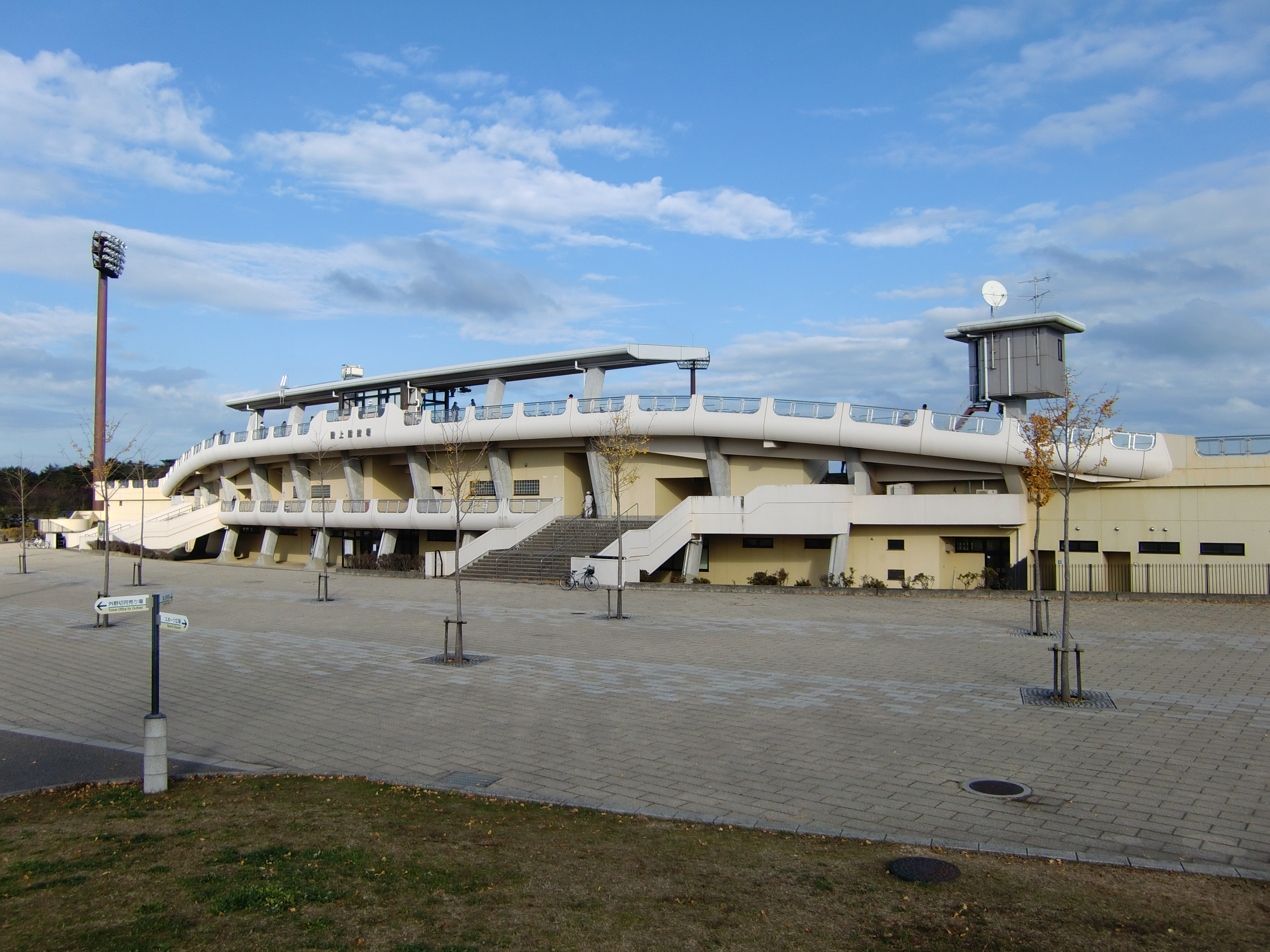
- Interactive map of Hitachinaka City Stadium
- Location: Hitachinaka, Ibaraki, Japan
- Owner: Hitachinaka City
- Operator: Hitachinaka City
- Capacity: 1800 in main stand + 16,700 grass
- Surface: grass

Construction
- Opened: 1998

Tenant
- Ryutsu Keizai University FC

Hitachinaka City Stadium (ひたちなか市陸上競技場) is a multipurpose athletic stadium in Hitachinaka, Ibaraki, Japan opened in 1978. The stadium has a nine-line athletic track surrounding a soccer field, and was the home stadium for the Mito HollyHock from 1998 to 2009.

== Gallery ==
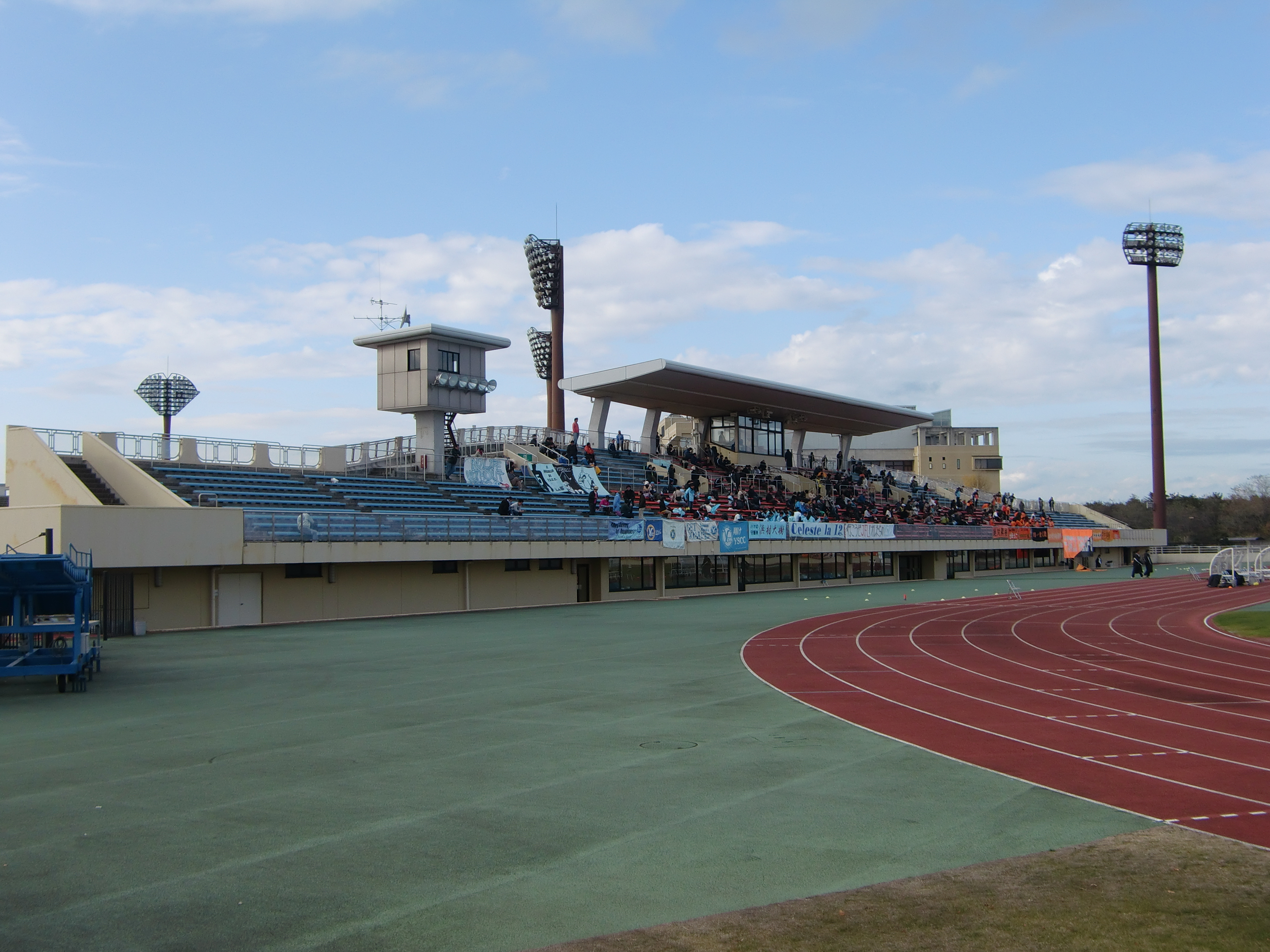

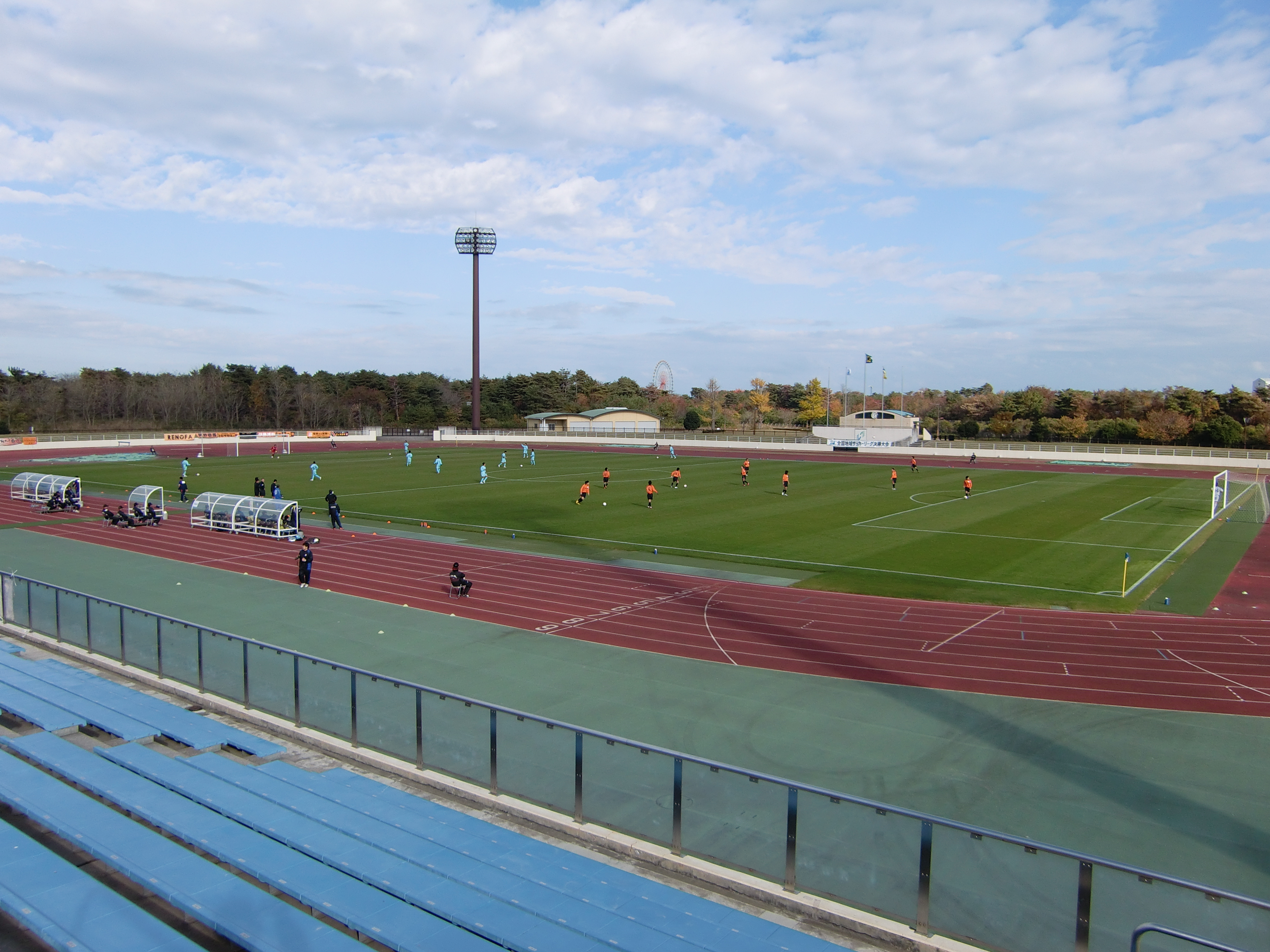

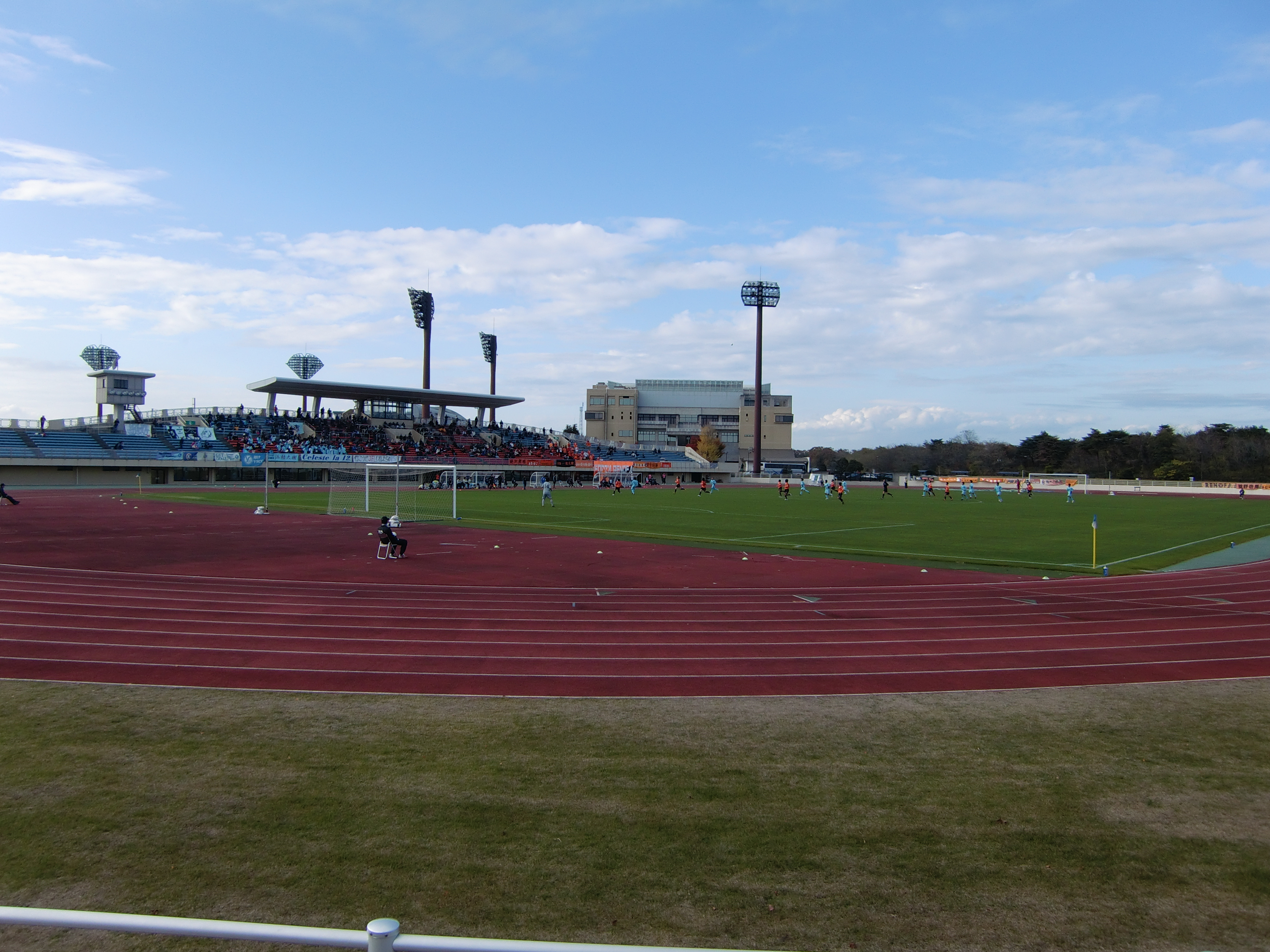
