= Mito Shinkin Bank Stadium =

Sports venue in Naka, Ibaraki Prefecture, Japan

Coordinates: 36°27′26″N 140°32′18″E

Kasamatsu Stadium Mito Shinkin Bank Stadium
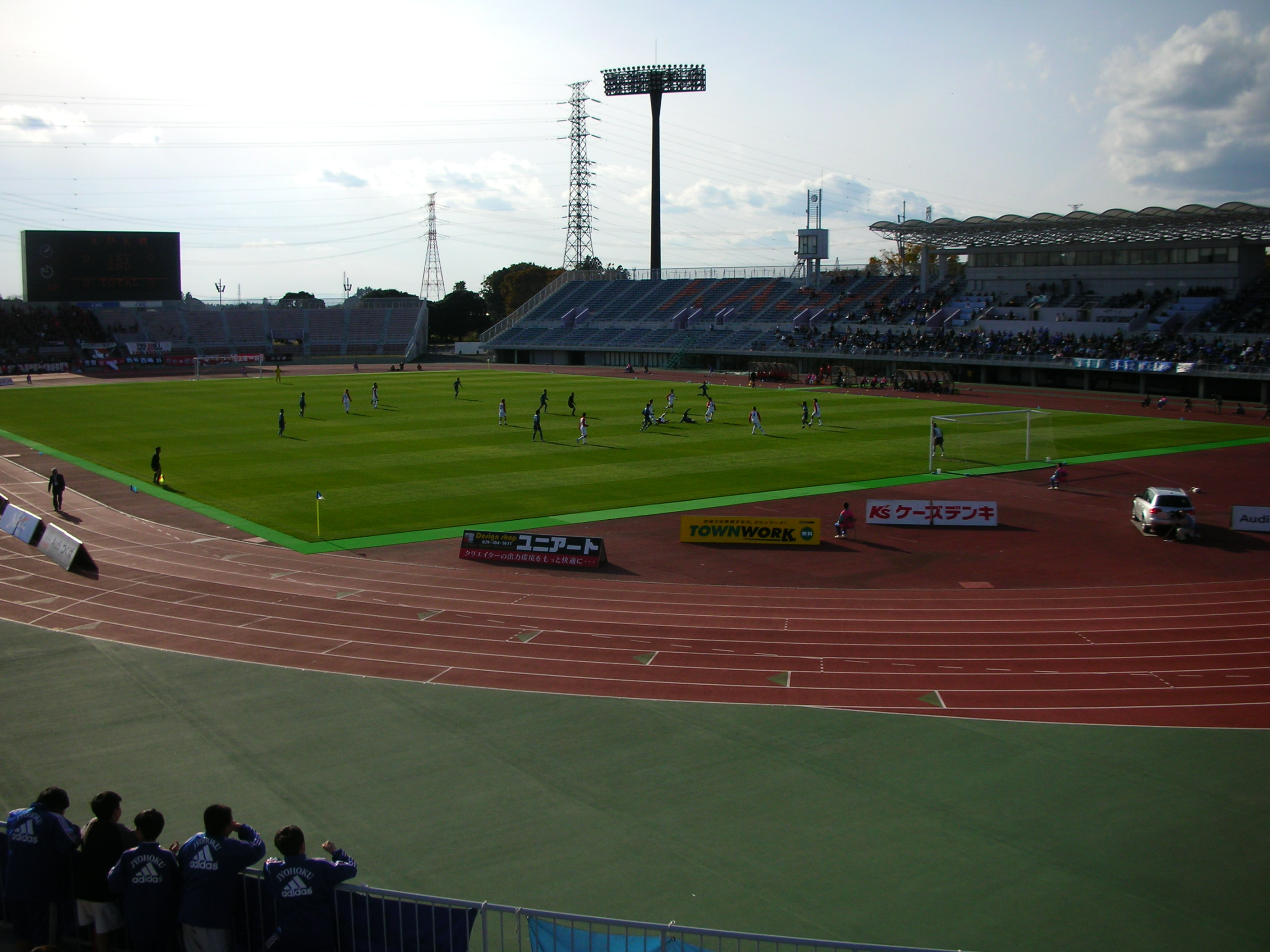
- Interactive map of Kasamatsu Stadium; Mito Shinkin Bank Stadium
- Location: Naka, Ibaraki Japan
- Owner: Ibaraki Prefecture
- Capacity: 22,002
- Field size: 106 m x 69 m

Construction
- Opened: 1976
- Renovated: 2001

Tenant
- Mito HollyHock

Mito Shinkin Bank Stadium (水戸信用金庫スタジアム) (formerly known as Kasamatsu Stadium (笠松運動公園陸上競技場) before being renamed for sponsorship reasons) is a multi-purpose stadium in Naka, Japan. It is currently used mostly for football matches and track and field events. It served as the main home ground of Mito HollyHock through 2011 and as of the 2026–27 season, is once again their main home ground. The stadium holds 22,002 people and was built in 1998.

After Mito HollyHock gained promotion to the J1 League ahead of the 2026-27 season, they required a stadium with at least 15,000 seats to comply with J1 League regulations. They therefore applied to use Mito Shinkin Bank Stadium with its larger capacity, rather than K's denki Stadium Mito which had been used as their home ground since 2011 but only has a capacity of 12,000.

It is a community stadium, and any person or group can use an unoccupied facility at any time the stadium is open. A vending machine sells tickets for this purpose in the main lobby.
