= Yokohama derby =

Local derby in Yokohama

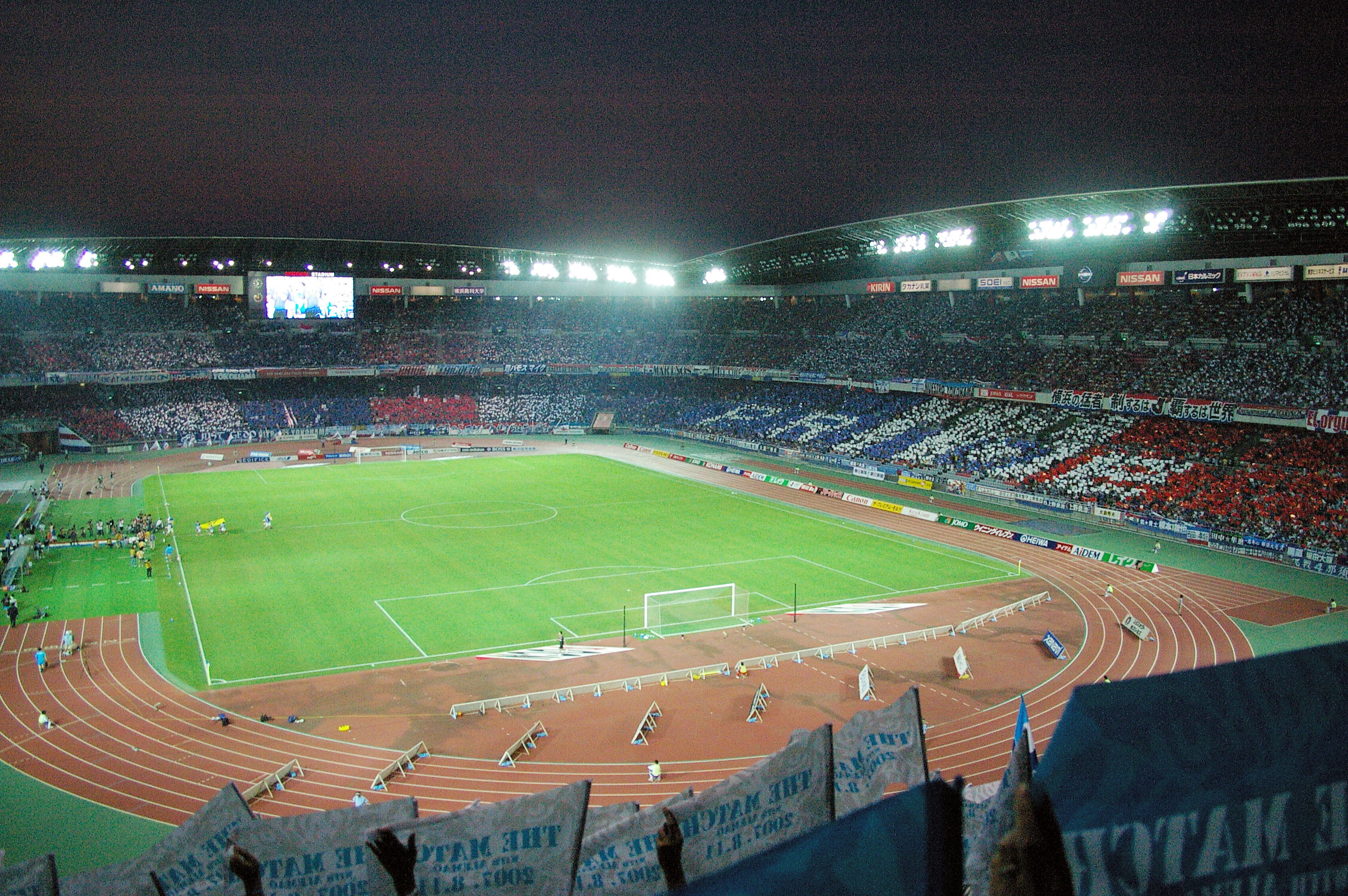
- Yokohama derby, 11 August 2007
- Location: Yokohama
- Teams: Yokohama F. Marinos (formerly Yokohama Marinos); Yokohama FC; Yokohama Flügels (defunct)
- First meeting: 24 February 1986; JSL Division 1 Nissan Motor 1–1 All Nippon Airways
- Latest meeting: 5 July 2025; J1 League; Yokohama FC 0–1 Yokohama F. Marinos
- Stadiums: Nissan Stadium; NHK Spring Mitsuzawa Football Stadium

Statistics
- Total meetings: 47
- Most wins: Yokohama F. Marinos (28)
- Top scorer: Ramón Díaz (8)
- All-time series: Yokohama F. Marinos: 28; Yokohama Flügels: 11; Yokohama FC: 3 Drawn: 5
- Largest victory: 11 August 2007; J.League Division 1 Yokohama F. Marinos 8–1 Yokohama FC

The Yokohama derby (横浜ダービー, Yokohama dābī) is the local derby in Yokohama, Kanagawa, Japan, between fierce city rivals, formerly Yokohama Marinos and Yokohama Flügels, and currently Yokohama F. Marinos and Yokohama FC.

== History ==
Nissan Motor FC was founded in 1972 by the employees of Nissan, and All Nippon Airways SC was founded as a citizens' club in 1964 and began receiving support from All Nippon Airways in 1979. Since amateur era, both clubs have had Yokohama as their home town, and the Yokohama derby was already held since 1986. During the final matchday of the domestic league in the first season for the derby, some ANA players staged a boycott and were permanently banned, leading to the founding of YSCC Yokohama. Nissan's club name was changed to Yokohama Marinos in 1992 due to its decision to go professional, and ANA's club name was changed to Yokohama Flügels in the same year, also after deciding to go professional. Flügels then merged with Marinos to become Yokohama F. Marinos in 1999, but many Flügels fans refused to support the new combined effort and created their own club, Yokohama FC.

The Yokohama derby is known as one of the most dangerous derby matches in Japan. On the 11 August 2007 derby, the Marinos' ultras were arrested after lynching the FC's supporters. On the 10 October 2012 derby, the FC's ultras posted expletive choreography, resulting in a permanent ban from all of FC's matches. On the 11 July 2018 derby, the FC's ultras refused to hold a moment of silence for the victims of the 2018 Japan floods and continued to sing chants. On the 5 July 2025 derby, the Marinos' ultras exploded and threw pyrotechnics at the FC's supporters outside the stadium, most of the Marinos' supporters were unable to get into the stands before the start of the match, as a result 73 Marinos' supporters were permanently banned and 4 Marinos' ultra groups were disbanded, and of those 40 Marinos' supporters paid 5,852,921 yen in compensation.

== Honours ==
As of 26 August 2023

Competition	F. Marinos	Flügels	FC
JSL Division 1 / J1 League	7	0	0
JSL Division 2 / JFL (1992–1998) / J2 League	0	1	1
Japan Football League	0	0	2
Emperor's Cup	7	2	0
JSL Cup / J.League Cup	4	0	0
Japanese Super Cup	1	0	0
All Japan Senior Football Championship	1	0	0
Japanese Regional Football League Competition	0	1	0
Asian Cup Winners' Cup	2	1	0
Asian Super Cup	0	1	0
Total	22	6	3

== Statistics ==
=== Marinos vs Flügels ===
Competition	Played	Marinos wins	Draws	Flügels wins	Marinos goals	Flügels goals
JSL Division 1	10	6	2	2	13	10
J.League	18	10	1	7	26	19
Emperor's Cup	1	1	0	0	4	2
JSL Cup	2	2	0	0	3	0
J.League Cup	2	0	0	2	2	5
Konica Cup	1	1	0	0	2	0
Total	34	20	3	11	50	36

=== F. Marinos vs FC ===
As of 5 July 2025, competitive matches only

Competition	Played	F. Marinos wins	Draws	FC wins	F. Marinos goals	FC goals
J1 League	10	5	2	3	27	11
Emperor's Cup	3	3	0	0	6	3
J.League Cup	0	0	0	0	0	0
Total	13	8	2	3	33	14

== Matches ==
=== Marinos vs Flügels ===
==== JSL Division 1 ====
#	Date	Home scorers	Home	Result	Away	Away scorers	Report
1	24 February 1986	unknown	Nissan	1–1	ANA	unknown	Report
2	16 March 1986	unknown	ANA	0–3	Nissan	unknown	Report
3	27 November 1988	unknown	ANA	1–2	Nissan	unknown	Report
4	23 April 1989	unknown	Nissan	2–1	ANA	unknown	Report
5	11 November 1989	unknown	ANA	1–2	Nissan	unknown	Report
6	18 March 1990	unknown	Nissan	1–5	ANA	unknown	Report
7	3 February 1991	unknown	Nissan	0–0	ANA	unknown	Report
8	10 March 1991	unknown	ANA	0–1	Nissan	unknown	Report
9	29 September 1991	unknown	ANA	0–1	Nissan	unknown	Report
10	15 March 1992	unknown	Nissan	0–1	ANA	unknown	Report

==== J.League ====
#	Date	Home scorers	Home	Result	Away	Away scorers	Report
1	12 June 1993	Miura (2), Díaz	Marinos	3–2	Flügels	Aldro, Moner	Report
2	10 July 1993	Maezono	Flügels	1–0	Marinos		Report
3	3 September 1993	Yamaguchi (2), Matsunaga (o.g.)	Flügels	3–2	Marinos	Díaz (2)	Report
4	8 December 1993	Díaz (3), Everton	Marinos	4–1	Flügels	Aldro	Report
5	23 April 1994	Maezono	Flügels	1–0	Marinos		Report
6	11 June 1994	Díaz, Omura	Marinos	2–1 (g.g.)	Flügels	Edu	Report
7	17 September 1994	Válber	Flügels	1–0	Marinos		Report
8	16 November 1994	Bisconti (2)	Marinos	2–0	Flügels		Report
9	25 March 1995		Flügels	0–1	Marinos	Bisconti	Report
10	10 May 1995		Marinos	0–0 (4–5 p)	Flügels		Report
11	19 August 1995	Maezono, Zinho	Flügels	2–1 (g.g.)	Marinos	Bisconti	Report
12	7 October 1995	Medina Bello	Marinos	1–0	Flügels		Report
13	20 April 1996	Zinho	Flügels	1–2 (g.g.)	Marinos	Ihara, Noda	Report
14	2 November 1996	Bisconti	Marinos	1–2	Flügels	Maezono, Sampaio	Report
15	12 July 1997	Salinas	Marinos	1–0	Flügels		Report
16	10 September 1997	Hattori, Fernando	Flügels	2–3	Marinos	Salinas (2), Okayama	Report
17	21 March 1998	Salinas	Marinos	1–2 (g.g.)	Flügels	Nagai, Sato	Report
18	15 September 1998		Flügels	0–2	Marinos	Nakamura, Yasunaga	Report

==== Emperor's Cup ====
#	Date	Home scorers	Home	Result	Away	Away scorers	Report
1	6 December 1992	Everton, unknown (o.g.), Matsuhashi (2)	Marinos	4–2 (a.e.t.)	Flügels	Alfred, Chelona	Report

==== JSL Cup ====
#	Date	Home scorers	Home	Result	Away	Away scorers	Report
1	10 September 1989	unknown	Nissan	2–0	ANA	unknown	Report
2	31 August 1990	unknown	Nissan	1–0	ANA	unknown	Report

==== J.League Cup ====
#	Date	Home scorers	Home	Result	Away	Away scorers	Report
1	11 October 1992	Everton	Marinos	1–2 (g.g.)	Flügels	Tomishima, Alfred	Report
2	11 September 1993	Edu (2), Aldro	Flügels	3–1	Marinos	Díaz	Report

==== Konica Cup ====
#	Date	Home scorers	Home	Result	Away	Away scorers	Report
1	14 October 1990	unknown	Nissan	2–0	ANA	unknown	Report

=== F. Marinos vs FC ===
==== J1 League ====
#	Date	Home scorers	Home	Result	Away	Away scorers	Report
1	10 March 2007	Hayakawa	FC	1–0	F. Marinos		Report
2	11 August 2007	Ōshima (4), Sakata, K. Yamase (2), Y. Yamase	F. Marinos	8–1	FC	Hiramoto	Report
3	22 July 2020	Tashiro (o.g.), Marcos Júnior, Endo, Edigar Junio	F. Marinos	4–0	FC		Report
4	19 December 2020	Shichi, Tashiro, Senuma	FC	3–1	F. Marinos	Onaiwu	Report
5	24 April 2021	Marcos Júnior, Onaiwu (2), Maeda, Léo Ceará	F. Marinos	5–0	FC		Report
6	25 September 2021	Saulo Mineiro (2)	FC	2–2	F. Marinos	Marcos Júnior, Maeda	Report
7	8 April 2023	Marcos Júnior, Anderson Lopes (2), Élber (2)	F. Marinos	5–0	FC		Report
8	26 August 2023	Hayashi, Ito, Eduardo (o.g.), Yoshino	FC	4–1	F. Marinos	Anderson Lopes	Report
9	26 February 2025		F. Marinos	0–0	FC		Report
10	5 July 2025		FC	0–1	F. Marinos	Anderson Lopes	Report

==== Emperor's Cup ====
#	Date	Home scorers	Home	Result	Away	Away scorers	Report
1	10 October 2012	Nakamura (2)	F. Marinos	2–1	FC	Watanabe	Report
2	11 July 2018	Hugo Vieira (2)	F. Marinos	2–1	FC	Toshima	Report
3	14 August 2019	Nakagawa, Otsu	F. Marinos	2–1	FC	Saito	Report

==== Friendly ====
#	Date	Home scorers	Home	Result	Away	Away scorers	Report
1	26 February 2006	Marques, Ōshima (2), Shimizu	F. Marinos	4–0	FC		

== Goalscorers ==
As of 5 July 2025, competitive matches only

Rank	Player	Club	Goals
1	(Argentina) Ramón Díaz	Marinos	8
2	(Argentina) David Bisconti	Marinos	5
3	(Brazil) Marcos Júnior	F. Marinos	4
3	(Brazil) Anderson Lopes	F. Marinos	4
3	(Japan) Masakiyo Maezono	Flügels	4
3	(Japan) Hideo Ōshima	Flügels; F. Marinos	4
3	(Spain) Julio Salinas	Marinos	4
8	(Brazil) Aldro	Flügels	3
8	(Brazil) Edu	Flügels	3
8	(Brazil) Everton	Marinos	3
8	(Japan) Shunsuke Nakamura	F. Marinos; FC	3
8	(Japan) Ado Onaiwu	F. Marinos	3
13	(Brazil) Élber	F. Marinos	2
13	(Slovenia) Alfred Jermaniš	Flügels	2
13	(Japan) Daizen Maeda	F. Marinos	2
13	(Japan) Rikizo Matsuhashi	Marinos	2
13	(Brazil) Saulo Mineiro	FC	2
13	(Japan) Fumitake Miura	Marinos	2
13	(Portugal) Hugo Vieira	F. Marinos	2
13	(Japan) Motohiro Yamaguchi	Flügels; FC	2
13	(Japan) Koji Yamase	F. Marinos	2
13	(Brazil) Zinho	Flügels	2

== Players who played for both clubs ==
=== F. Marinos and Flügels ===
Player	F. Marinos	Flügels
(Japan) Hiroshi Hirakawa	1987–1994	1995
(Japan) Junji Koizumi	1988–1995	1995–1996
(Japan) Masahiko Nakagawa	1995–1997	1992–1995
(Brazil) Válber	1999	1994, 1997
(Japan) Kazuki Sato	1999, 2002–2003	1997–1998
(Japan) Atsuhiro Miura	1999–2000	1994–1998
(Japan) Hideki Nagai	1999–2000	1998
(Japan) Takayuki Yoshida	1999–2000, 2006–2007	1995–1998
(Japan) Yasuhiro Hato	1999–2004, 2010–2011	1995–1998
(Japan) Hiroshi Sato	2001–2004	1992–1998
(Japan) Hideo Ōshima	2005–2008	1998

=== F. Marinos and FC ===
Player	F. Marinos	FC
(Japan) Takuya Jinno	1989–1995	2001–2003
(Japan) Norio Omura	1992–2001	2006–2007
(Japan) Takayuki Nakamaru	1996–1997	1999
(Japan) Kenichi Hashimoto	1997	1999
(Japan) Shoji Jo	1997–1999, 2000–2001	2003–2006
(Japan) Shunsuke Nakamura	1997–2002, 2010–2016	2019–2022
(Japan) Kazuki Sato	1999, 2002–2003	2005
(Japan) Atsuhiro Miura	1999–2000	2007–2010
(Japan) Yutaka Tahara	2001–2002	2012–2013
(Japan) Daisuke Oku	2002–2006	2007
(Japan) Tatsuhiko Kubo	2003–2006	2007
(Japan) Takanobu Komiyama	2006–2009	2017
(Japan) Masakazu Tashiro	2007–2010, 2013	2018–2021
(Japan) Kazuma Watanabe	2009–2011	2021–2022
(Japan) Masato Fujita	2010	2011
(Japan) Eijiro Takeda	2011	2018–2024
(Japan) Masashi Oguro	2011–2013	2010
(Japan) Yuji Rokutan	2012–2014	2020–2023
(Japan) Yoshihito Fujita	2013–2014	2011
(Japan) Sho Ito	2014–2018	2021, 2022–
(Japan) Kota Yamada	2017–2019	2025–
(Japan) Taiga Nishiyama	2018	2022–2023
(Japan) Yushi Yamaya	2019	2022
(Japan) Takuya Wada	2019–2021	2022–2024
(Japan) Makito Ito	2019–2021	2025–
(Japan) Ryuji Sugimoto	2020	2020–2021
(Japan) Yohei Takaoka	2020–2022	2014–2018
(Japan) Tomoki Kondo	2026–	2021–2023

=== Flügels and FC ===
Player	Flügels	FC
(Argentina) Fernando Moner	1988–1991, 1993–1994	2002–2003
(Japan) Motohiro Yamaguchi	1991–1998	2005–2007
(Japan) Ippei Watanabe	1992–1995	1999–2000
(Japan) Masaaki Takada	1992–1996	1999–2001
(Japan) Atsuhiro Miura	1994–1998	2007–2010
(Japan) Kazuki Sato	1997–1998	2005

=== F. Marinos, Flügels and FC ===
Player	F. Marinos	Flügels	FC
(Japan) Kazuki Sato	1999, 2002–2003	1997–1998	2005
(Japan) Atsuhiro Miura	1999–2000	1994–1998	2007–2010
