= 1993 Emperor's Cup final =

1993 Emperor's Cup Final
Yokohama Flügels	Kashima Antlers
6	2
- Date: January 1, 1994
- Venue: National Stadium, Tokyo

1993 Emperor's Cup Final was the 73rd final of the Emperor's Cup competition. The final was played at National Stadium in Tokyo on January 1, 1994. Yokohama Flügels won the championship.

== Overview ==
Yokohama Flügels won their 1st title, by defeating Kashima Antlers 6–2 with Edu, Ippei Watanabe, Amarilla and Yasuharu Sorimachi goal.

== Match details ==
January 1, 1994

Yokohama Flügels	6–2	Kashima Antlers
Edu 44', 63'; Ippei Watanabe 112'; Amarilla 115', 118'; Yasuharu Sorimachi 119'		Hisashi Kurosaki 6'; Ryosuke Okuno 89'

National Stadium

Yokohama Flügels
GK	16	(Japan) Ryuji Ishizue
DF	2	(Japan) Naoto Otake
DF	4	(Japan) Atsuhiro Iwai
DF	12	(Japan) Norihiro Satsukawa
DF	17	(Japan) Ichizo Nakata
MF	5	(Japan) Motohiro Yamaguchi
MF	8	(Japan) Masaaki Takada
MF	15	(Japan) Masakiyo Maezono
MF	10	(Brazil) Edu
FW	11	(Paraguay) Amarilla
FW	9	(Japan) Osamu Maeda
Manager:
(Japan) Shu Kamo

Kashima Antlers
GK	1	(Japan) Masaaki Furukawa
DF	2	(Japan) Yutaka Akita
DF	3	(Japan) Kenji Oba
DF	4	(Japan) Ryosuke Okuno
DF	5	(Japan) Shunzo Ono
MF	6	(Japan) Yasuto Honda
MF	8	(Brazil) Santos
MF	11	(Japan) Masatada Ishii
FW	7	(Brazil) Alcindo
FW	9	(Japan) Hisashi Kurosaki
FW	14	(Japan) Yoshiyuki Hasegawa
Manager:
(Japan) Masakatsu Miyamoto

== See also ==
- 1993 Emperor's Cup
