= 1994 Yokohama Flügels season =

Yokohama Flügels
1994 season
- Manager: Shū Kamo; Bunji Kimura (December 1994)
- Stadium: Yokohama Mitsuzawa Football Stadium
- J.League: 7th
- Emperor's Cup: 2nd Round
- J.League Cup: Quarterfinals
- Super Cup: Runners-up
- Asian Cup Winners' Cup: Champions
- Top goalscorer: League: Amarilla (12); Edu (12); All: Amarilla (12); Edu (12); Válber (12)
- Highest home attendance: 14,508 (vs Yokohama Marinos, 17 September 1994); 55,014 (vs Verdy Kawasaki, 8 June 1994, Tokyo National Stadium)
- Lowest home attendance: 10,624 (vs Nagoya Grampus Eight, 23 March 1994); 10,130 (vs Urawa Red Diamonds, 6 April 1994, Kagoshima Kamoike Stadium)
- Average home league attendance: 19,438
Home colours	Away colours

1994 Yokohama Flügels season

== Review and events ==
=== League results summary ===
Overall								Home						Away					
Pld	W	D	L	GF	GA	GD	Pts	W	D	L	GF	GA	GD	W	D	L	GF	GA	GD
44	22	0	22	67	60	+7	66	11	0	11	31	29	+2	11	0	11	36	31	+5

Source: J.LEAGUE OFFICIAL 1995 RECORD & DATA. ISBN 4-09-102317-7.

=== League results by round ===
J.League Suntory series (first stage)
Round	1	2	3	4	5	6	7	8	9	10	11	12	13	14	15	16	17	18	19	20	21	22
Ground	A	H	A	H	A	A	H	A	H	A	H	A	H	A	H	H	A	H	A	H	A	H
Result	L	W	L	W	W	W	W	W	W	W	W	L	L	W	W	L	L	W	L	W	L	L
Position	7	5	6	6	4	4	3	3	2	2	2	3	3	3	3	3	3	3	5	4	5	5

Source: J.LEAGUE OFFICIAL 1995 RECORD & DATA. ISBN 4-09-102317-7.
A = Away; H = Home; W = Win; D = Draw; L = Loss

J.League NICOS series (second stage)
Round	1	2	3	4	5	6	7	8	9	10	11	12	13	14	15	16	17	18	19	20	21	22
Ground	A	H	A	H	A	A	H	A	A	H	H	A	H	A	H	H	A	H	H	A	A	H
Result	W	L	L	L	W	W	L	L	W	L	W	W	W	W	L	L	L	W	L	L	L	L
Position	4	4	6	11	6	5	7	8	6	8	7	5	4	3	4	4	7	5	7	7	8	8

Source: J.LEAGUE OFFICIAL 1995 RECORD & DATA. ISBN 4-09-102317-7.
A = Away; H = Home; W = Win; D = Draw; L = Loss

== Competitions ==
Competitions	Position
J.League	7th / 12 clubs
Emperor's Cup	2nd round
J.League Cup	Quarterfinals
Super Cup	Runners-up
Asian Cup Winners' Cup	Champions

== Domestic results ==
=== J.League ===
==== Suntory series ====
12 March 1994 1st-1	Shimizu S-Pulse	1–0	Yokohama Flügels	Nihondaira Sports Stadium
14:59 JST (UTC+09)	Nagashima 88'	J. League		Attendance: 10,071; Referee: Yōtarō Moritsu; Assistant referees: Kazuo Kakihana, Yasushi Tsuchimoto; Fourth official: Takuji Fukazawa

16 March 1994 1st-2	Yokohama Flügels	4–1	JEF United Ichihara	Yokohama Mitsuzawa Football Stadium
19:04 JST (UTC+09)	Amarilla 1'; Ōtake 22'; Edu 47'; Maezono 61'	J. League	Jō 79'	Attendance: 13,028; Referee: Zoran Petrović; Assistant referees: Noboru Ishiyama, Keiichi Sunakawa; Fourth official: Jōji Kashihara; Man of the Match: Masakiyo Maezono

19 March 1994 1st-3	Sanfrecce Hiroshima	2–1	Yokohama Flügels	Hiroshima Stadium
15:02 JST (UTC+09)	Shima 40'; Hašek 51'	J. League	Válber 58'	Attendance: 11,387; Referee: Hideo Kikuchi; Assistant referees: Hideaki Harada, Toyohide Kanda; Fourth official: Kazuhiko Matsumura

23 March 1994 1st-4	Yokohama Flügels	1–0	Nagoya Grampus Eight	Yokohama Mitsuzawa Football Stadium
19:03 JST (UTC+09)	Edu 59'	J. League		Attendance: 10,624; Referee: Kiichirō Tachi; Assistant referees: Kazuaki Hamaguchi, Masato Nogami; Fourth official: Kanichi Takahashi; Man of the Match: Edu

26 March 1994 1st-5	Gamba Osaka	1–3	Yokohama Flügels	Expo '70 Commemorative Stadium
16:04 JST (UTC+09)	Mita 33'	J. League	Maezono 37'; Amarilla 74', 87'	Attendance: 20,854; Referee: Zoran Petrović; Assistant referees: Fumikazu Shioyazono, Yoshitsugu Katayama; Fourth official: Tsuyoshi Miyake; Man of the Match: Atsuhiko Mori

2 April 1994 1st-6	Júbilo Iwata	1–2	Yokohama Flügels	Júbilo Iwata Stadium
14:00 JST (UTC+09)	Paus 55'	J. League	Amarilla 14'; Edu 62'	Attendance: 15,268; Referee: Yoshimi Ogawa; Assistant referees: Kazuo Kakihana, Yasushi Tsuchimoto; Fourth official: Toshiaki Futamata; Man of the Match: Edu

6 April 1994 1st-7	Yokohama Flügels	2–1 (V-goal) (a.e.t.)	Urawa Red Diamonds	Kagoshima Kamoike Stadium
19:03 JST (UTC+09)	Amarilla 22' 107'	J. League	Mochizuki 10'	Attendance: 10,130; Referee: Shizuo Takada; Assistant referees: Toshiyuki Mayuzumi, Hideaki Harada; Fourth official: Shōji Hamada; Man of the Match: Amarilla

9 April 1994 1st-8	Bellmare Hiratsuka	1–4	Yokohama Flügels	Hiratsuka Stadium
15:03 JST (UTC+09)	Natsuka 86'	J. League	Maeda 36'; Amarilla 44'; Edu 73', 75'	Attendance: 13,971; Referee: Tetsuya Hamana; Assistant referees: Mitsuru Satō, Hiroshi Fukuda; Fourth official: Takatoshi Itō; Man of the Match: Moner

13 April 1994 1st-9	Yokohama Flügels	1–0 (V-goal) (a.e.t.)	Kashima Antlers	Tokyo National Stadium
19:03 JST (UTC+09)	Maeda 98'	J. League		Attendance: 50,187; Referee: Kenji Tanaka; Assistant referees: Hiroshi Fukuda, Hitoshi Yamada; Fourth official: Hideaki Ishii; Man of the Match: Motohiro Yamaguchi

16 April 1994 1st-10	Verdy Kawasaki	0–1 (V-goal) (a.e.t.)	Yokohama Flügels	Tokyo National Stadium
15:03 JST (UTC+09)		J. League	Amarilla 107'	Attendance: 51,770; Referee: Kōetsu Kikuchi; Assistant referees: Yū Nakamura, Hiroshi Fukuda; Fourth official: Kazuo Shirato; Man of the Match: Amarilla

23 April 1994 1st-11	Yokohama Flügels	1–0	Yokohama Marinos	Yokohama Mitsuzawa Football Stadium
15:01 JST (UTC+09)	Maezono 73'	J. League		Attendance: 14,326; Referee: Zoran Petrović; Assistant referees: Noboru Ishiyama, Naotsugu Fuse; Fourth official: Nobuhiro Shirai; Man of the Match: Atsuhiro Iwai

27 April 1994 1st-12	JEF United Ichihara	2–1 (V-goal) (a.e.t.)	Yokohama Flügels	Ichihara Stadium
19:02 JST (UTC+09)	Otze 67'; Igarashi 104'	J. League	Maezono 52'	Attendance: 9,734; Referee: Tatsumi Ōno; Assistant referees: Takashi Kunori, Kazuhisa Osada; Fourth official: Terunobu Kakinuma

30 April 1994 1st-13	Yokohama Flügels	1–2	Sanfrecce Hiroshima	Nagasaki Stadium
15:02 JST (UTC+09)	Edu 19' (pen.)	J. League	Hašek 59'; Takagi 76'	Attendance: 15,958; Referee: Bengt Borjesson; Assistant referees: Noboru Ishiyama, Hideaki Harada; Fourth official: Shigehisa Yamaguchi

4 May 1994 1st-14	Nagoya Grampus Eight	0–2	Yokohama Flügels	Tecnoport Fukui Stadium
14:02 JST (UTC+09)		J. League	Maezono 62'; Watanabe 87'	Attendance: 15,206; Referee: Hideo Kikuchi; Assistant referees: Kimio Izaki, Yasushi Tsuchimoto; Fourth official: Masao Nakajō; Man of the Match: Masakiyo Maezono

7 May 1994 1st-15	Yokohama Flügels	3–2	Gamba Osaka	Yokohama Mitsuzawa Football Stadium
15:01 JST (UTC+09)	Amarilla 14', 86'; Válber 80'	J. League	Flavio 60' (pen.); Aleinikov 63'	Attendance: 13,904; Referee: Kōetsu Kikuchi; Assistant referees: Kazuaki Hamaguchi, Yū Nakamura; Fourth official: Michio Nakahara; Man of the Match: Amarilla

14 May 1994 1st-16	Yokohama Flügels	1–2	Júbilo Iwata	Kagoshima Kamoike Stadium
18:33 JST (UTC+09)	Válber 13'	J. League	Paus 3'; Vanenburg 88'	Attendance: 15,502; Referee: Zoran Petrović; Assistant referees: Noboru Ishiyama, Tōru Yamashiro; Fourth official: Shōji Hamada

18 May 1994 1st-17	Urawa Red Diamonds	3–0	Yokohama Flügels	Tokyo National Stadium
19:02 JST (UTC+09)	Y. Satō 32'; Asano 54'; N. Ikeda 66'	J. League		Attendance: 48,466; Referee: Tetsuya Hamana; Assistant referees: Kazuaki Hamaguchi, Kenichi Koshiyama; Fourth official: Ichirō Kuwabara

1 June 1994 1st-18	Yokohama Flügels	3–0	Bellmare Hiratsuka	Nagasaki Stadium
19:03 JST (UTC+09)	Harada 20'; Maeda 70'; 88' (o.g.)	J. League		Attendance: 14,051; Referee: Hideo Kikuchi; Assistant referees: Hideaki Harada, Tōru Yamashiro; Fourth official: Shigehisa Yamaguchi; Man of the Match: Takeo Harada

4 June 1994 1st-19	Kashima Antlers	3–2	Yokohama Flügels	Kashima Soccer Stadium
18:32 JST (UTC+09)	Alcindo 61', 86'; Masuda 78'	J. League	Maeda 41'; Amarilla 89'	Attendance: 16,270; Referee: Tatsumi Ōno; Assistant referees: Hiroshi Fukuda, Tetsu Karakida; Fourth official: Ichirō Inukai

8 June 1994 1st-20	Yokohama Flügels	1–1 (V-goal) (a.e.t.) (5–3 p)	Verdy Kawasaki	Tokyo National Stadium
19:02 JST (UTC+09)	Amarilla 35'	J. League	Nishizawa 74'	Attendance: 55,014; Referee: Hideo Kikuchi; Assistant referees: Hiroshi Fukuda, Masato Nogami; Man of the Match: Atsuhiro Iwai
	Penalties
	(penalty scored) Edu; (penalty scored) Maeda; (penalty scored) Katsura; (penalty scored) Válber; (penalty scored) Iwai		(penalty missed) Hashiratani; (penalty scored) Miura; (penalty scored) Bismarck; (penalty scored) Kitazawa

11 June 1994 1st-21	Yokohama Marinos	2–1 (V-goal) (a.e.t.)	Yokohama Flügels	Hiratsuka Stadium
18:59 JST (UTC+09)	Díaz 80'; Omura 93'	J. League	Edu 37'	Attendance: 16,671; Referee: Yoshimi Ogawa; Assistant referees: Yū Nakamura, Satoru Kawano; Fourth official: Yasuhiko Koiso

15 June 1994 1st-22	Yokohama Flügels	1–2	Shimizu S-Pulse	Toyama Stadium
19:03 JST (UTC+09)	Hattori 83'	J. League	Nagashima 54', 69'	Attendance: 26,972; Referee: Zoran Petrović; Assistant referees: Fumikazu Shioyazono, Kōji Taniuchi; Fourth official: Kinji Sakō

==== NICOS series ====
10 August 1994 2nd-1	Shimizu S-Pulse	0–3	Yokohama Flügels	Kusanagi Athletic Stadium
19:05 JST (UTC+09)		J. League	Maezono 11'; Válber 41', 77'	Attendance: 18,478; Referee: Masayoshi Okada; Assistant referees: Mitsuru Satō, Masato Nogami; Fourth official: Teruhito Kudō; Man of the Match: Válber

13 August 1994 2nd-2	Yokohama Flügels	1–2	JEF United Ichihara	Nagasaki Stadium
18:34 JST (UTC+09)	Maezono 55'	J. League	Gotō 6'; Ordenewitz 47'	Attendance: 14,702; Referee: Zoran Petrović; Assistant referees: Hiroshi Fukuda, Tōru Yamashiro; Fourth official: Tsutomu Iya

17 August 1994 2nd-3	Sanfrecce Hiroshima	4–1	Yokohama Flügels	Hiroshima Stadium
19:03 JST (UTC+09)	Takagi 13', 64' (pen.); Fue 44'; Hašek 45'	J. League	Katsura 76'	Attendance: 11,782; Referee: Keiichi Sunakawa; Assistant referees: Hideaki Harada, Satoru Kawano; Fourth official: Kazuyuki Tanimoto

20 August 1994 2nd-4	Yokohama Flügels	1–2 (V-goal) (a.e.t.)	Nagoya Grampus Eight	Yokohama Mitsuzawa Football Stadium
19:02 JST (UTC+09)	Maeda 68'	J. League	Nakanishi 58'; Jorginho 96'	Attendance: 13,319; Referee: Tetsuya Hamana; Assistant referees: Hitoshi Yamada, Mitsuo Kadota; Fourth official: Kenji Ōgiya

27 August 1994 2nd-5	Gamba Osaka	1–3	Yokohama Flügels	Kobe Universiade Memorial Stadium
19:01 JST (UTC+09)	Flavio 39'	J. League	Edu 65' (pen.); Maeda 70'; Maezono 72'	Attendance: 36,270; Referee: Yoshimi Ogawa; Assistant referees: Kazuya Yanagisawa, Kazunori Ōtoshi; Fourth official: Keiji Hayashi; Man of the Match: Osamu Maeda

31 August 1994 2nd-6	Júbilo Iwata	0–2	Yokohama Flügels	Júbilo Iwata Stadium
19:01 JST (UTC+09)		J. League	Yoshioka 36'; Edu 67'	Attendance: 14,736; Referee: Shizuo Takada; Assistant referees: Kazuya Yanagisawa, Yasushi Tsuchimoto; Fourth official: Toshiaki Futamata; Man of the Match: Edu

3 September 1994 2nd-7	Yokohama Flügels	0–1	Urawa Red Diamonds	Yokohama Mitsuzawa Football Stadium
15:30 JST (UTC+09)		J. League	Buchwald 89' (pen.)	Attendance: 14,083; Referee: Kenji Tanaka; Assistant referees: Kimio Izaki, Masahiro Katagiri; Fourth official: Haruo Suzuki

7 September 1994 2nd-8	Bellmare Hiratsuka	2–1 (V-goal) (a.e.t.)	Yokohama Flügels	Tokyo National Stadium
19:03 JST (UTC+09)	H. Iwamoto 79'; T. Iwamoto 116'	J. League	Edu 60' (pen.)	Attendance: 44,338; Referee: Tatsumi Ōno; Assistant referees: Kazuaki Hamaguchi, Tetsuya Hamana; Fourth official: Kanichi Takahashi

10 September 1994 2nd-9	Kashima Antlers	1–2	Yokohama Flügels	Kashima Soccer Stadium
19:04 JST (UTC+09)	Hasegawa 3'	J. League	Yamaguchi 16'; Maeda 42'	Attendance: 15,638; Referee: Alberto Tejada; Assistant referees: Yasuhiro Matsuzaki, Masato Nogami; Fourth official: Ichirō Inukai; Man of the Match: Norihiro Satsukawa

14 September 1994 2nd-10	Yokohama Flügels	2–3	Verdy Kawasaki	Yokohama Mitsuzawa Football Stadium
19:04 JST (UTC+09)	Maeda 8'; Katsura 85'	J. League	Bentinho 17', 68'; Takeda 45'	Attendance: 14,085; Referee: Fumikazu Shioyazono; Assistant referees: Hitoshi Yamada, Masato Nogami; Fourth official: Kazuhiko Uchida

17 September 1994 2nd-11	Yokohama Flügels	1–0	Yokohama Marinos	Yokohama Mitsuzawa Football Stadium
19:02 JST (UTC+09)	Válber 5'	J. League		Attendance: 14,508; Referee: Naotsugu Fuse; Assistant referees: Takashi Kunori, Yasuhiro Matsuzaki; Fourth official: Hiroshi Yamaguchi; Man of the Match: Atsuhiro Iwai

21 September 1994 2nd-12	JEF United Ichihara	0–3	Yokohama Flügels	Toyama Stadium
19:05 JST (UTC+09)		J. League	Válber 18'; Yamaguchi 52'; Maeda 66'	Attendance: 23,258; Referee: Alberto Tejada; Assistant referees: Tatsumi Ōno, Kōji Taniuchi; Fourth official: Atsushi Tanaka; Man of the Match: Motohiro Yamaguchi

19 October 1994 2nd-13	Yokohama Flügels	3–1	Sanfrecce Hiroshima	Tokyo National Stadium
19:03 JST (UTC+09)	Edu 32'; Maeda 61'; Válber 68'	J. League	Takagi 44'	Attendance: 49,650; Referee: Zoran Petrović; Assistant referees: Hiroshi Fukuda, Kazuaki Hamaguchi; Fourth official: Mineo Takada; Man of the Match: Edu

22 October 1994 2nd-14	Nagoya Grampus Eight	0–3	Yokohama Flügels	Gifu Nagaragawa Stadium
18:34 JST (UTC+09)		J. League	Válber 11', 65'; Edu 44' (pen.)	Attendance: 24,817; Referee: Yoshimi Ogawa; Assistant referees: Kazuaki Hamaguchi, Satoru Ishizawa; Fourth official: Takahiko Sugiyama; Man of the Match: Válber

26 October 1994 2nd-15	Yokohama Flügels	0–2	Gamba Osaka	Kumamoto Suizenji Stadium
19:01 JST (UTC+09)		J. League	Yamaguchi 30', 82'	Attendance: 12,241; Referee: Fumikazu Shioyazono; Assistant referees: Hideaki Harada, Tōru Yamashiro; Fourth official: Mitsuo Kimura

29 October 1994 2nd-16	Yokohama Flügels	1–3	Júbilo Iwata	Nagasaki Stadium
18:33 JST (UTC+09)	Maeda 88'	J. League	Fujita 37'; Schillaci 65'; Matsubara 86'	Attendance: 14,472; Referee: Shinichirō Obata; Assistant referees: Hideaki Harada, Yoshikazu Hiroshima; Fourth official: Shigehisa Yamaguchi

2 November 1994 2nd-17	Urawa Red Diamonds	3–1	Yokohama Flügels	Omiya Football Stadium
19:01 JST (UTC+09)	Bein 4', 16'; Okano 83'	J. League	Aldro 6'	Attendance: 9,901; Referee: Rune Larsson; Assistant referees: Noboru Ishiyama, Kenichi Koshiyama; Fourth official: Noboru Shioi

5 November 1994 2nd-18	Yokohama Flügels	3–0	Bellmare Hiratsuka	Yokohama Mitsuzawa Football Stadium
15:02 JST (UTC+09)	13' (o.g.); Válber 59'; Aldro 87'	J. League		Attendance: 13,890; Referee: Hiroyuki Umemoto; Assistant referees: Kōji Taniuchi, Takeshi Ōkura; Fourth official: Mitsuo Ōno; Man of the Match: Atsuhiko Mori

9 November 1994 2nd-19	Yokohama Flügels	0–2	Kashima Antlers	Kagoshima Kamoike Stadium
19:04 JST (UTC+09)		J. League	Naitō 73'; Hasegawa 83'	Attendance: 13,269; Referee: Fumikazu Shioyazono; Assistant referees: Hideaki Harada, Tōru Yamashiro; Fourth official: Shōji Hamada

12 November 1994 2nd-20	Verdy Kawasaki	2–0	Yokohama Flügels	Kawasaki Todoroki Stadium
19:03 JST (UTC+09)	Bismarck 20'; Fujiyoshi 74'	J. League		Attendance: 15,533; Referee: Yoshimi Ogawa; Assistant referees: Yū Nakamura, Kimio Izaki; Fourth official: Kōzō Shibata

16 November 1994 2nd-21	Yokohama Marinos	2–0	Yokohama Flügels	Yokohama Mitsuzawa Football Stadium
19:01 JST (UTC+09)	Bisconti 37', 81'	J. League		Attendance: 13,102; Referee: Kiyoshi Ōta; Assistant referees: Keiichi Sunakawa, Kazuhisa Osada; Fourth official: Ryū Tetsusashi

19 November 1994 2nd-22	Yokohama Flügels	0–2	Shimizu S-Pulse	Yokohama Mitsuzawa Football Stadium
15:02 JST (UTC+09)		J. League	Toninho 10'; Sawanobori 63'	Attendance: 13,714; Referee: Hideo Kikuchi; Assistant referees: Tetsuya Hamana, Tetsu Karakida; Fourth official: Toshiya Kumagai

=== Emperor's Cup ===
4 December 1994 1st Round	Yokohama Flügels	1–0	PJM Futures	Miyazaki Park Stadium
: JST (UTC+09)	Aldro ?'

11 December 1994 2nd Round	Yokohama Flügels	0–2	Urawa Red Diamonds	Hiratsuka Stadium
14:01 JST (UTC+09)			Fukuda 6'; Mizuuchi 82'	Attendance: 15,180; Referee: Keiichi Sunakawa

=== J.League Cup ===
27 July 1994 1st Round	Yokohama Flügels	1–0	Cerezo Osaka	Kagoshima Kamoike Stadium
19:09 JST (UTC+09)	Watanabe 63'	J. League		Attendance: 6,166; Referee: Hiroyuki Umemoto; Assistant referees: Yoshikazu Hiroshima, Tōru Yamashiro; Fourth official: Shōji Hamada

30 July 1994 Quarterfinals	Yokohama Flügels	0–2	Júbilo Iwata	Kagoshima Kamoike Stadium
18:59 JST (UTC+09)		J. League	Schillaci 50', 63'	Attendance: 12,956; Referee: Kiyoshi Ōta; Assistant referees: Hideaki Harada, Hiroshi Tanabe; Fourth official: Shōji Hamada

=== Super Cup ===
5 March 1994	Yokohama Flügels	1–2	Verdy Kawasaki	Tokyo National Stadium
14:06 JST (UTC+09)	Válber 63'	J. League	Takeda 44'; Bismarck 77'	Attendance: 51,154; Referee: Shinichirō Obata; Assistant referees: Tatsumi Ōno, Hiroshi Fukuda; Fourth official: Keiichi Sunakawa

== International results ==
=== Asian Cup Winners' Cup ===
1st Round	bye

2nd Round	bye

10 November 1994 Quarterfinals-1	(Hong Kong) Instant-Dict	2–1	(Japan) Yokohama Flügels	Hong Kong
	? ?' ? ?'		? ?'

27 November 1994 Quarterfinals-2	(Japan) Yokohama Flügels	3–1 (4–3 agg.)	(Hong Kong) Instant-Dict	Yokohama, Japan
	Hattori ?'; Válber ?'; Maezono ?'		Gallagher ?'	Stadium: Yokohama Mitsuzawa Football Stadium

20 January 1995 Semifinals	(Japan) Yokohama Flügels	4–2	(Thailand) TOT	Sharjah, United Arab Emirates
	? ?' ? ?' ? ?' ? ?'		? ?' ? ?'

22 January 1995 Final	(Japan) Yokohama Flügels	2–1 (a.e.t.)	(United Arab Emirates) Al Shabab	Sharjah, United Arab Emirates
	Watanabe ?', ?'		? ?'

== Player statistics ==
Pos.	Nat.	Player	D.o.B. (Age)	Height / Weight	J.League		Emperor's Cup		J.League Cup		Super Cup		Dom. Total		Asian Cup Winners' Cup	
Pos.	Nat.	Player	D.o.B. (Age)	Height / Weight	Apps	Goals	Apps	Goals	Apps	Goals	Apps	Goals	Apps	Goals	Apps	Goals
DF	(Spain)	Andrés Saavedra	April 10, 1956 (aged 37)	182 cm / 76 kg	10	5	0	0	0	0	1	0	11	5		
FW	(Paraguay)	Amarilla	July 19, 1960 (aged 33)	189 cm / 77 kg	19	12	0	0	0	0	1	0	20	12		
MF	(Brazil)	Edu	February 2, 1963 (aged 31)	180 cm / 75 kg	37	12	0	0	2	0	1	0	40	12		
GK	(Japan)	Ryūji Ishizue	July 22, 1964 (aged 29)	184 cm / 75 kg	7	0	0	0	2	0	0	0	9	0		
FW	(Japan)	Osamu Maeda	September 5, 1965 (aged 28)	176 cm / 74 kg	39	11	2	0	2	0	0	0	43	11		
DF	(Japan)	Hiroki Azuma	July 10, 1966 (aged 27)	179 cm / 75 kg	7	0	0	0	0	0	0	0	7	0		
DF	(Japan)	Atsuhiro Iwai	January 31, 1967 (aged 27)	177 cm / 66 kg	38	0	2	0	0	0	1	0	41	0		
DF	(Argentina)	Moner	December 30, 1967 (aged 26)	185 cm / 75 kg	31	0	2	0	2	0	0	0	35	0		
DF	(Japan)	Naoto Ōtake	October 18, 1968 (aged 25)	178 cm / 72 kg	40	1	2	0	2	0	1	0	45	1		
MF	(Japan)	Motohiro Yamaguchi	January 29, 1969 (aged 25)	177 cm / 72 kg	34	2	2	0	1	0	1	0	38	2		
GK	(Japan)	Masahiko Nakagawa	August 26, 1969 (aged 24)	180 cm / 72 kg	0	0		0	0	0	0	0		0		
DF	(Japan)	Ippei Watanabe	September 28, 1969 (aged 24)	184 cm / 80 kg	16	1	0	0	2	1	1	0	19	2		
MF	(Japan)	Hideki Katsura	March 6, 1970 (aged 24)	160 cm / 58 kg	23	2	2	0	1	0	1	0	27	2		
FW	(Japan)	Shūji Kusano	April 2, 1970 (aged 23)	179 cm / 73 kg	1	0	0	0	0	0	0	0	1	0		
MF	(Japan)	Jun Naitō	December 18, 1970 (aged 23)	170 cm / 64 kg	1	0	0	0	0	0	0	0	1	0		
FW	(Japan)	Hiroki Hattori	August 30, 1971 (aged 22)	180 cm / 76 kg	26	1	1	0	2	0	1	0	30	1		
MF	(Japan)	Takeo Harada	October 2, 1971 (aged 22)	173 cm / 72 kg	31	1	2	0	2	0	0	0	35	1		
MF	(Brazil)	Válber	December 6, 1971 (aged 22)	174 cm / 68 kg	32	11	2	0	1	0	1	1	36	12		
GK	(Japan)	Hiroshi Satō	March 7, 1972 (aged 22)	181 cm / 74 kg	0	0		0	0	0	0	0		0		
DF	(Japan)	Norihiro Satsukawa	April 18, 1972 (aged 21)	175 cm / 70 kg	35	0	2	0	2	0	0	0	39	0		
FW	(Japan)	Yoshiyuki Sakamoto	May 30, 1972 (aged 21)	170 cm / 65 kg	0	0		0	0	0	0	0		0		
GK	(Japan)	Atsuhiko Mori	May 31, 1972 (aged 21)	179 cm / 73 kg	37	0	2	0	1	0	1	0	41	0		
DF	(Japan)	Hideki Yoshioka	June 6, 1972 (aged 21)	178 cm / 72 kg	7	1	0	0	0	0	0	0	7	1		
FW	(Brazil)	Aldro	July 30, 1972 (aged 21)	176 cm / 74 kg	6	2	2	1	1	0	0	0	9	3		
MF	(Japan)	Ichizō Nakata	April 19, 1973 (aged 20)	174 cm / 69 kg	14	0	0	0	0	0	0	0	14	0		
MF	(Japan)	Akihiko Ichikawa	May 22, 1973 (aged 20)	174 cm / 66 kg	0	0		0	0	0	0	0		0		
MF	(Japan)	Masaaki Takada	July 26, 1973 (aged 20)	182 cm / 76 kg	26	0	0	0	1	0	1	0	28	0		
MF	(Japan)	Masakiyo Maezono	October 29, 1973 (aged 20)	170 cm / 63 kg	38	8	2	0	2	0	1	0	43	8		
DF	(Japan)	Tomohiro Irie	November 14, 1973 (aged 20)	180 cm / 76 kg	0	0		0	0	0	0	0		0		
FW	(Japan)	Takashi Uemura	December 2, 1973 (aged 20)	190 cm / 85 kg	1	0	0	0	0	0	0	0	1	0		
DF	(Japan)	Nobuo Maruyama	April 5, 1974 (aged 19)	180 cm / 74 kg	0	0		0	0	0	0	0		0		
FW	(Japan)	Satoru Ogata	April 5, 1974 (aged 19)	185 cm / 80 kg	0	0		0	0	0	0	0		0		
DF	(Japan)	Nobuyuki Ōishi	May 23, 1974 (aged 19)	180 cm / 72 kg	1	0	0	0	0	0	0	0	1	0		
MF	(Japan)	Satoshi Yoneyama	June 27, 1974 (aged 19)	171 cm / 65 kg	0	0		0	0	0	0	0		0		
MF	(Japan)	Atsuhiro Miura	July 24, 1974 (aged 19)	174 cm / 68 kg	0	0		0	0	0	0	0		0		
FW	(Japan)	Seiichirō Okuno	July 26, 1974 (aged 19)	180 cm / 68 kg	0	0		0	0	0	0	0		0		
FW	(Japan)	Hideaki Kaetsu	October 8, 1974 (aged 19)	177 cm / 62 kg	0	0		0	0	0	0	0		0		
MF	(Japan)	Makoto Segawa	November 26, 1974 (aged 19)	166 cm / 62 kg	0	0		0	0	0	0	0		0		

- † player(s) joined the team after the opening of this season.

== Transfers ==
In:

No.	Pos.	Nation	Player
—	DF	JPN	Hiroki Azuma (from Gamba Osaka)
—	DF	ESP	Andrés Saavedra (from Sporting Gijón)
—	MF	JPN	Takeo Harada (from Waseda University)
—	MF	BRA	Válber (from Corinthians)
—	MF	JPN	Atsuhiro Miura (from Aoyama Gakuin University)
—	FW	JPN	Hiroki Hattori (from University of Tsukuba)

Out:

No.	Pos.	Nation	Player
—	DF	SLV	Chelona
—	DF	JPN	Naoto Hori
—	DF	JPN	Keita Yoshizumi
—	MF	JPN	Shinji Kobayashi
—	MF	JPN	Yasuharu Sorimachi (to Bellmare Hiratsuka)
—	MF	JPN	Shunichi Ikenoue (to PJM Futures)
—	MF	JPN	Shūta Sonoda (to Fujieda Blux)
—	MF	JPN	Manabu Umezawa
—	FW	JPN	Hitoshi Tomishima
—	FW	BRA	Angelo (to Kyoto Purple Sanga)

== Transfers during the season ==
=== In ===
- (Spain) Andrés Saavedra (to Sporting Gijón on June)

=== Out ===
- (Japan) Shūji Kusano (to Kashiwa Reysol on June)
- (Paraguay) Amarilla (on July)
- (Brazil) Aldro (on December)
- (Spain) Andrés Saavedra (to Sporting Gijón on December)

== Awards ==
none

== Other pages ==
- (in Japanese) J. League official site
- (in Japanese) Yokohama F. Marinos official web site
