= Makoto Segawa =

Japanese footballer

Makoto Segawa 瀬川 誠
Personal information
- Full name: Makoto Segawa
- Date of birth: November 26, 1974 (age 51)
- Place of birth: Kurihara, Miyagi, Japan
- Height: 1.68 m (5 ft 6 in)
- Position: Forward

Youth career
- 1990–1992: Sendai Ikuei High School

Senior career*
Years	Team	Apps	(Gls)
1993–1994	Yokohama Flügels	0	(0)
1996–1997	Fukushima FC		
1998–2001	Vegalta Sendai	56	(8)
Total		56	(8)
Medal record
Yokohama Flügels
Winner	Emperor's Cup	1993
- * Club domestic league appearances and goals

Makoto Segawa (瀬川 誠, Segawa Makoto; born November 26, 1974) is a former Japanese football player.

== Playing career ==
Segawa was born in Kurihara on November 26, 1974. After graduating from high school, he joined Yokohama Flügels in 1993. However he could not play at all in the match. In 1995, he moved to Japan Football League (JFL) club Fukushima FC. However the club was disbanded end of 1997 season due to financial strain. In 1998, he moved to his local club Brummell Sendai (later Vegalta Sendai) in JFL. He played as regular player and the club was promoted to J2 League in 1999. However he could hardly play in the match from 2000 and he retired end of 2001 season.

== Club statistics ==
Club performance			League		Cup		League Cup		Total	
Season	Club	League	Apps	Goals	Apps	Goals	Apps	Goals	Apps	Goals
Japan			League		Emperor's Cup		J.League Cup		Total	
1993	Yokohama Flügels	J1 League	0	0	0	0	0	0	0	0
1994	Yokohama Flügels	J1 League	0	0	0	0	0	0	0	0
1995	Fukushima FC	Football League								
1996	Fukushima FC	Football League								
1997	Fukushima FC	Football League								
1998	Brummell Sendai	Football League	26	6	2	1	4	1	32	8
1999	Vegalta Sendai	J2 League	27	2	2	0	1	0	30	2
2000	Vegalta Sendai	J2 League	3	0	1	0	2	0	6	0
2001	Vegalta Sendai	J2 League	0	0	1	0	0	0	1	0
Total			56	8	6	1	7	1	69	10
