= Yoshiyuki Sakamoto =

Japanese footballer

Yoshiyuki Sakamoto 坂本 義行
Personal information
- Full name: Yoshiyuki Sakamoto
- Date of birth: May 30, 1972 (age 54)
- Place of birth: Hyogo, Japan
- Height: 1.70 m (5 ft 7 in)
- Position: Forward

Youth career
- 1988–1990: Shizuoka Gakuen High School

Senior career*
Years	Team	Apps	(Gls)
1991–1996	Yokohama Flügels		
Medal record
Yokohama Flügels
Winner	Emperor's Cup	1993
- * Club domestic league appearances and goals

Yoshiyuki Sakamoto (坂本 義行, Sakamoto Yoshiyuki; born May 30, 1972) is a former Japanese football player.

== Playing career ==
Sakamoto was born in Hyogo Prefecture on May 30, 1972. After graduating from Shizuoka Gakuen High School, he joined All Nippon Airways (later Yokohama Flügels) in 1991. He debuted in September 1993 and played several matches in 1993 season. However he could not play at all in the match from 1994 and retired end of 1996 season.

== Club statistics ==
Club performance			League		Cup		League Cup		Total	
Season	Club	League	Apps	Goals	Apps	Goals	Apps	Goals	Apps	Goals
Japan			League		Emperor's Cup		J.League Cup		Total	
1991/92	All Nippon Airways	JSL Division 1								
1992	Yokohama Flügels	J1 League	-				0	0	0	0
1993	Yokohama Flügels	J1 League	3	0	1	0	1	0	5	0
1994	Yokohama Flügels	J1 League	0	0	0	0	0	0	0	0
1995	Yokohama Flügels	J1 League	0	0	0	0	-		0	0
1996	Yokohama Flügels	J1 League	0	0	0	0	0	0	0	0
Total			3	0	1	0	1	0	5	0
