= Shuji Kusano =

Japanese footballer

Shuji Kusano 草野 修治
Personal information
- Full name: Shuji Kusano
- Date of birth: April 2, 1970 (age 56)
- Place of birth: Iwaki, Fukushima, Japan
- Height: 1.79 m (5 ft 10 1/2 in)
- Position: Forward

Youth career
- 1986–1988: Taira Technical High School
- 1989–1992: Sendai University

Senior career*
Years	Team	Apps	(Gls)
1993–1994	Yokohama Flügels	1	(0)
1994–1995	Kashiwa Reysol		
1996–1997	Brummell Sendai	25	(7)
Total		26	(7)
Medal record
Yokohama Flügels
Winner	Emperor's Cup	1993
- * Club domestic league appearances and goals

Shuji Kusano (草野 修治, Kusano Shuji; born April 2, 1970) is a former Japanese football player.

== Playing career ==
Kusano was born in Iwaki on April 2, 1970. After graduating from Sendai University, he joined the Yokohama Flügels in 1993. On March 23, 1994, he debuted against Nagoya Grampus Eight. However he only played in that match and then he moved to the Japan Football League (JFL) club Kashiwa Reysol in June. The club won second place in 1994 and was promoted to the J1 League. In 1996, he moved to his local club Brummell Sendai in the JFL. He retired at the end of the 1997 season.

== Career statistics ==
Appearances and goals by club, season and competition
Club	Season	League			Emperor's Cup		J.League Cup		Total	
Club	Season	Division	Apps	Goals	Apps	Goals	Apps	Goals	Apps	Goals
Yokohama Flügels	1993	J1 League	0	0			0	0	0	0
Yokohama Flügels	1994	J1 League	1	0	0	0	0	0	1	0
Kashiwa Reysol	1994	Football League								
Kashiwa Reysol	1995	J1 League	10	0	0	0	—		10	0
Brummell Sendai	1996	Football League	17	6	1	0	—		18	6
Brummell Sendai	1997	Football League	8	1	0	0	5	3	13	4
Career total			36	7	1	0	5	3	42	10
