= Satoshi Yoneyama (footballer) =

Japanese footballer

Satoshi Yoneyama 米山 智
Personal information
- Full name: Satoshi Yoneyama
- Date of birth: June 27, 1974 (age 52)
- Place of birth: Kanagawa, Japan
- Height: 1.71 m (5 ft 7 1/2 in)
- Position: Midfielder

Youth career
- 1990–1992: Shichirigahama High School

Senior career*
Years	Team	Apps	(Gls)
1993–1997	Yokohama Flügels	22	(0)
Total		22	(0)
Medal record
Yokohama Flügels
Winner	Emperor's Cup	1993
Runner-up	Emperor's Cup	1997
- * Club domestic league appearances and goals

Satoshi Yoneyama (米山 智, Yoneyama Satoshi; born June 27, 1974) is a Japanese former football player.

== Playing career ==
Yoneyama was born in Kanagawa Prefecture on June 27, 1974. After graduating from high school, he joined Yokohama Flügels in 1993. He did not play until 1994, having his first match in June 1995 and playing many matches as a midfielder. He did not play at all in 1996. Although he played several matches in 1997, he retired at the end of the 1997 season.

== Career statistics ==
Appearances and goals by club, season and competition
Club	Season	League			Emperor's Cup		J.League Cup		Total	
Club	Season	Division	Apps	Goals	Apps	Goals	Apps	Goals	Apps	Goals
Yokohama Flügels	1993	J1 League	0	0	0	0	0	0	0	0
Yokohama Flügels	1994	J1 League	0	0	0	0	0	0	0	0
Yokohama Flügels	1995	J1 League	18	0	0	0	—		18	0
Yokohama Flügels	1996	J1 League	0	0	0	0	0	0	0	0
Yokohama Flügels	1997	J1 League	4	0	0	0	0	0	4	0
Career total			22	0	0	0	0	0	22	0
