= Jun Naito =

Japanese footballer

Jun Naito 内藤 潤
Personal information
- Full name: Jun Naito
- Date of birth: December 18, 1970 (age 55)
- Place of birth: Ishikawa, Japan
- Height: 1.70 m (5 ft 7 in)
- Position: Midfielder

Youth career
- Shizuoka Gakuen High School

Senior career*
Years	Team	Apps	(Gls)
????–1994	Yokohama Flügels		
1995–1997	Vissel Kobe		
Medal record
Yokohama Flügels
Winner	Emperor's Cup	1993
- * Club domestic league appearances and goals

Jun Naito (内藤 潤, Naito Jun; born December 18, 1970) is a former Japanese football player.

== Playing career ==
Naito was born in Ishikawa Prefecture on December 18, 1970. After graduating from Shizuoka Gakuen High School, he played Yokohama Flügels. He played many matches in 1992 J.League Cup. However he could not play at all in the match in 1993. Although he debuted in J1 League in April 1994, he could only play this match in 1994 season. In 1995, he moved to Japan Football League club Vissel Kobe. The club won the 2nd place in 1996 and was promoted to J1 League. Although he played many matches, he retired end of 1997 season.

== Career statistics ==
Appearances and goals by club, season and competition
Club	Season	League			Emperor's Cup		J.League Cup		Total	
Club	Season	Division	Apps	Goals	Apps	Goals	Apps	Goals	Apps	Goals
Yokohama Flügels	1992	J1 League	-				7	0	7	0
Yokohama Flügels	1993	J1 League	0	0	0	0	0	0	0	0
Yokohama Flügels	1994	J1 League	1	0	0	0	0	0	1	0
Vissel Kobe	1995	Football League								
Vissel Kobe	1996	Football League								
Vissel Kobe	1997	J1 League	27	0	0	0	3	0	30	0
Career total			28	0	0	0	10	0	38	0
