= Takashi Uemura (footballer) =

Japanese footballer and manager

Takashi Uemura 上村 崇士
Personal information
- Full name: Takashi Uemura
- Date of birth: December 2, 1973 (age 52)
- Place of birth: Osaka, Japan
- Height: 1.91 m (6 ft 3 in)
- Position: Forward

Youth career
- 1989–1991: Kunimi High School

Senior career*
Years	Team	Apps	(Gls)
1992–1994	Yokohama Flügels	1	(0)
1995–1996	Vissel Kobe	16	(2)
1997–1998	Sagan Tosu	56	(22)
1999	Kawasaki Frontale	8	(2)
2000	Cerezo Osaka	16	(0)
2001–2002	JEF United Ichihara	4	(0)
Total		101	(26)

Managerial career
- 2005–2006: JEF United Chiba Ladies
- 2008–2013: JEF United Chiba Ladies
Medal record
Yokohama Flügels
Winner	Emperor's Cup	1993
- * Club domestic league appearances and goals

Takashi Uemura (上村 崇士, Uemura Takashi; born December 2, 1973) is a former Japanese football player and manager.

== Playing career ==
Uemura was born in Osaka Prefecture on December 2, 1973. After graduating from high school, he joined Yokohama Flügels in 1992. Although he played many matches in first season, he could hardly play in any of the matches in 1993. In 1995, he moved to Japan Football League (JFL) club Vissel Kobe. Although he played many matches in 1995, he could not play at all in 1996. In 1997, he moved to JFL club Sagan Tosu. He played as regular player and scored many goals in 2 seasons. In 1999, he moved to J2 League club Kawasaki Frontale. Although the club won the champions, he could hardly play in the match. In 2000, he moved to his local club Cerezo Osaka. In 2001, he moved to JEF United Ichihara. However, he could hardly play in the match and retired end of 2002 season.

== Coaching career ==
After retirement, Uemura became a coach for JEF United Ichihara (later JEF United Chiba) in 2003. In 2005, he became a manager for JEF United Chiba Ladies in L.League Division 2 and managed until 2006. In 2008, he became a manager JEF United Chiba Ladies again. In 2008, the club won the champions and was promoted to Division 1. In 2012, the club won the 2nd place Empress's Cup. He managed the club until 2013.

== Club statistics ==
Club performance			League		Cup		League Cup		Total	
Season	Club	League	Apps	Goals	Apps	Goals	Apps	Goals	Apps	Goals
Japan			League		Emperor's Cup		J.League Cup		Total	
1992	Yokohama Flügels	J1 League	-		0	0	6	0	6	0
1993	Yokohama Flügels	J1 League	0	0	0	0	0	0	0	0
1994	Yokohama Flügels	J1 League	1	0	0	0	0	0	1	0
1995	Vissel Kobe	Football League	16	2	0	0	-		16	2
1996	Vissel Kobe	Football League	0	0	0	0	-		0	0
1997	Sagan Tosu	Football League	28	10	3	2	4	0	35	12
1998	Sagan Tosu	Football League	28	12	3	1	-		31	13
1999	Kawasaki Frontale	J2 League	8	2	0	0	1	0	9	2
2000	Cerezo Osaka	J1 League	16	0	3	3	4	1	23	4
2001	JEF United Ichihara	J1 League	4	0	0	0	0	0	4	0
2002	JEF United Ichihara	J1 League	0	0	0	0	0	0	0	0
Total			101	26	9	6	15	1	125	33
