= 1993 Yokohama Flügels season =

Yokohama Flügels
1993 season
- Manager: Shū Kamo
- Stadium: Yokohama Mitsuzawa Football Stadium
- J.League: 6th
- Emperor's Cup: Champions (→Asian Cup Winners' Cup)
- J.League Cup: Semifinals
- Top goalscorer: League: Osamu Maeda (10); All: Osamu Maeda (15)
- Highest home attendance: 14,886 (vs Kashima Antlers, 16 June 1993); 51,082 (vs Verdy Kawasaki, 25 August 1993, Tokyo National Stadium)
- Lowest home attendance: 7,469 (vs Urawa Red Diamonds, 22 May 1993)
- Average home league attendance: 15,462
Home colours	Away colours

1993 Yokohama Flügels season

== Review and events ==
=== League results summary ===
Overall								Home						Away					
Pld	W	D	L	GF	GA	GD	Pts	W	D	L	GF	GA	GD	W	D	L	GF	GA	GD
36	16	0	20	44	51	−7	48	8	0	10	23	22	+1	8	0	10	21	29	−8

Source: J.LEAGUE OFFICIAL RECORD & DATA 1994. ISBN 4-09-102309-6.

=== League results by round ===
J.League Suntory series (first stage)
Round	1	2	3	4	5	6	7	8	9	10	11	12	13	14	15	16	17	18
Ground	H	A	H	A	H	H	A	H	A	H	A	H	A	A	H	A	H	A
Result	W	L	W	W	L	L	L	W	L	W	L	L	W	L	L	L	W	W
Position	2	3	3	2	3	5	6	4	6	5	7	8	7	8	9	9	7	7

Source: J.LEAGUE OFFICIAL RECORD & DATA 1994. ISBN 4-09-102309-6.
A = Away; H = Home; W = Win; D = Draw; L = Loss

J.League NICOS series (second stage)
Round	1	2	3	4	5	6	7	8	9	10	11	12	13	14	15	16	17	18
Ground	A	H	A	H	A	A	H	A	H	A	H	A	H	H	A	H	A	H
Result	W	L	L	L	W	W	L	W	W	W	W	L	L	W	L	L	L	L
Position	3	5	8	10	8	6	8	8	4	3	3	3	4	4	5	6	7	7

Source: J.LEAGUE OFFICIAL RECORD & DATA 1994. ISBN 4-09-102309-6.
A = Away; H = Home; W = Win; D = Draw; L = Loss

== Competitions ==
Competitions	Position
J.League	6th / 10 clubs
Emperor's Cup	Champions
J.League Cup	Semifinals

== Domestic results ==
=== J.League ===
==== Suntory series ====
16 May 1993 1st-1	Yokohama Flügels	3–2	Shimizu S-Pulse	Yokohama Mitsuzawa Football Stadium
13:05 JST (UTC+09)	Angelo 9'; Moner 57'; Maeda 59'	J. League	Edu 42'; Toninho 89'	Attendance: 14,126; Referee: Martin Bodenham; Assistant referees: Kiichirō Tachi, Noboru Ishiyama

19 May 1993 1st-2	Kashima Antlers	3–2	Yokohama Flügels	Kashima Soccer Stadium
19:01 JST (UTC+09)	Alcindo 23'; Carlos 35'; Hasegawa 79'	J. League	Maeda 53'; Edu 84'	Attendance: 9,403; Referee: Kiichirō Tachi; Assistant referees: Naotsugu Fuse, Kimio Izaki; Fourth official: Ryūichi Mogi

22 May 1993 1st-3	Yokohama Flügels	3–1	Urawa Red Diamonds	Yokohama Mitsuzawa Football Stadium
18:35 JST (UTC+09)	Takada 27'; Maeda 44', 59'	J. League	Mochizuki 72'	Attendance: 7,469; Referee: Kōetsu Kikuchi; Assistant referees: Yū Nakamura, Noboru Ishiyama; Fourth official: Takashi Aoki

26 May 1993 1st-4	Nagoya Grampus Eight	1–2	Yokohama Flügels	Nagoya Mizuho Football Stadium
19:01 JST (UTC+09)	Lineker 89'	J. League	Maeda 47'; Edu 60' (pen.)	Attendance: 12,544; Referee: Hitoshi Yamada; Assistant referees: Toshiyuki Mayuzumi, Yoshio Sawada; Fourth official: Takayoshi Kashino

29 May 1993 1st-5	Yokohama Flügels	1–2	Sanfrecce Hiroshima	Kagoshima Kamoike Stadium
15:02 JST (UTC+09)	Angelo 11'	J. League	Černý 51'; Kazama 80'	Attendance: 15,141; Referee: Martin Bodenham; Assistant referees: Fumikazu Shioyazono, Hideaki Harada; Fourth official: Shōji Hamada

2 June 1993 1st-6	Yokohama Flügels	0–1	Gamba Osaka	Yokohama Mitsuzawa Football Stadium
19:03 JST (UTC+09)		J. League	Nagashima 36'	Attendance: 9,725; Referee: Tatsumi Ōno; Assistant referees: Mitsuru Satō, Keiichi Sunakawa; Fourth official: Senri Takahashi

5 June 1993 1st-7	Verdy Kawasaki	1–1 (a.s.d.e.t.) (5–4 p)	Yokohama Flügels	Tokyo National Stadium
15:03 JST (UTC+09)	Takeda 51'	J. League	Aldro 53'	Attendance: 54,995; Referee: Hideo Kikuchi; Assistant referees: Noboru Ishiyama, Takashi Kunori
	Penalties
	(penalty scored) Hashiratani; (penalty scored) Miura; (penalty scored) Kitazawa; (penalty scored) Pereira; (penalty scored) Totsuka		(penalty scored) Edu; (penalty scored) Maeda; (penalty missed) Aldro; (penalty scored) Iwai; (penalty scored) Moner

9 June 1993 1st-8	Yokohama Flügels	1–0	JEF United Ichihara	Yokohama Mitsuzawa Football Stadium
19:05 JST (UTC+09)	Aldro 89'	J. League		Attendance: 13,633; Referee: Shizuo Takada; Assistant referees: Kazuaki Hamaguchi, Mitsuru Satō; Fourth official: Senri Takahashi

12 June 1993 1st-9	Yokohama Marinos	3–2	Yokohama Flügels	Yokohama Mitsuzawa Football Stadium
18:31 JST (UTC+09)	Miura 1', 17'; Díaz 21'	J. League	Aldro 15'; Moner 82'	Attendance: 11,734; Referee: Hideo Kikuchi; Assistant referees: Yū Nakamura, Masato Nogami; Fourth official: Tetsuya Sugano

16 June 1993 1st-10	Yokohama Flügels	2–0	Kashima Antlers	Yokohama Mitsuzawa Football Stadium
19:02 JST (UTC+09)	Watanabe 9'; Aldro 71'	J. League		Attendance: 14,886; Referee: Fumikazu Shioyazono; Assistant referees: Noboru Ishiyama, Kazuaki Hamaguchi; Fourth official: Takashi Aoki

19 June 1993 1st-11	Shimizu S-Pulse	1–0	Yokohama Flügels	Nihondaira Sports Stadium
19:01 JST (UTC+09)	Sawanobori 21'	J. League		Attendance: 8,726; Referee: Shizuo Takada; Assistant referees: Takashi Kunori, Yoshimi Ogawa; Fourth official: Takuji Fukazawa

23 June 1993 1st-12	Yokohama Flügels	1–2 (a.s.d.e.t.)	Nagoya Grampus Eight	Kumamoto Suizenji Stadium
19:03 JST (UTC+09)	Maeda 56'	J. League	75' (o.g.); Hirano 94'	Attendance: 15,328; Referee: Martin Bodenham; Assistant referees: Shizuo Takada, Hideaki Harada; Fourth official: Takatsugu Nakayama

26 June 1993 1st-13	Sanfrecce Hiroshima	1–2 (a.s.d.e.t.)	Yokohama Flügels	Hiroshima Stadium
18:34 JST (UTC+09)	Katanosaka 24'	J. League	Watanabe 3'; Sorimachi 94'	Attendance: 13,680; Referee: Yōtarō Moritsu; Assistant referees: Morihisa Yamaguchi, Hiroshi Tanabe; Fourth official: Masahiro Katsuyama

30 June 1993 1st-14	Gamba Osaka	2–1	Yokohama Flügels	Expo '70 Commemorative Stadium
19:00 JST (UTC+09)	Nagashima 14'; Müller 31'	J. League	Angelo 89'	Attendance: 16,506; Referee: Hiroyuki Umemoto; Assistant referees: Yoshitsugu Katayama, Yasuhiro Hemmi; Fourth official: Sōichirō Kaneko

3 July 1993 1st-15	Yokohama Flügels	0–0 (a.s.d.e.t.) (1–3 p)	Verdy Kawasaki	Nagasaki Stadium
19:05 JST (UTC+09)		J. League		Attendance: 14,552; Referee: Martin Bodenham; Assistant referees: Kiyoshi Ōta, Hideaki Harada; Fourth official: Shigehisa Yamaguchi
	Penalties
	(penalty missed) Edu; (penalty missed) Moner; (penalty missed) Iwai; (penalty scored) Maeda		(penalty scored) Hashiratani; (penalty missed) Miura; (penalty missed) Kitazawa; (penalty scored) Pereira; (penalty scored) Ishikawa

7 July 1993 1st-16	JEF United Ichihara	1–0 (a.s.d.e.t.)	Yokohama Flügels	Ichihara Stadium
19:01 JST (UTC+09)	Pavel 112'	J. League		Attendance: 8,941; Referee: Tatsumi Ōno; Assistant referees: Kazuaki Hamaguchi, Masahiro Katagiri; Fourth official: Kō Ōishi

10 July 1993 1st-17	Yokohama Flügels	1–0	Yokohama Marinos	Yokohama Mitsuzawa Football Stadium
18:35 JST (UTC+09)	Maezono 47'	J. League		Attendance: 13,943; Referee: Martin Bodenham; Assistant referees: Masayoshi Okada, Hisashi Uemura; Fourth official: Takashi Aoki

14 July 1993 1st-18	Urawa Red Diamonds	0–2	Yokohama Flügels	Urawa Komaba Stadium
19:01 JST (UTC+09)		J. League	Watanabe 17'; Iwai 30'	Attendance: 8,905; Referee: Masayoshi Okada; Assistant referees: Kazuaki Hamaguchi, Masahiro Katagiri; Fourth official: Morihiko Yamaji

==== NICOS series ====
24 July 1993 2nd-1	Nagoya Grampus Eight	1–2	Yokohama Flügels	Kobe Universiade Memorial Stadium
18:31 JST (UTC+09)	Jorginho 29'	J. League	Maeda 8'; Edu 44'	Attendance: 38,757; Referee: Kenji Tanaka; Assistant referees: Yasuhiro Hemmi, Toyohide Kanda; Fourth official: Keiji Hayashi

31 July 1993 2nd-2	Yokohama Flügels	2–3	JEF United Ichihara	Yokohama Mitsuzawa Football Stadium
19:33 JST (UTC+09)	Takada 35'; Tomishima 88'	J. League	Echigo 22'; Gotō 23'; Littbarski 61'	Attendance: 12,425; Referee: Kōetsu Kikuchi; Assistant referees: Takashi Kunori, Satoru Ishizawa; Fourth official: Katsunori Moriya

4 August 1993 2nd-3	Sanfrecce Hiroshima	3–0	Yokohama Flügels	Hiroshima Stadium
19:03 JST (UTC+09)	Tanaka 47'; Noh 58'; Černý 89'	J. League		Attendance: 12,758; Referee: Shinichirō Obata; Assistant referees: Kazunori Okada, Masanori Watanabe; Fourth official: Kōji Hanaguchi

7 August 1993 2nd-4	Yokohama Flügels	0–1 (a.s.d.e.t.)	Shimizu S-Pulse	Kumamoto Suizenji Stadium
19:00 JST (UTC+09)		J. League	Tajima 112'	Attendance: 13,133; Referee: Hideo Kikuchi; Assistant referees: Toyohide Kanda, Hideaki Harada; Fourth official: Tōru Yamashiro

14 August 1993 2nd-5	Kashima Antlers	1–2	Yokohama Flügels	Kashima Soccer Stadium
18:31 JST (UTC+09)	Manaka 73'	J. League	Maeda 30'; Yamaguchi 48'	Attendance: 14,035; Referee: Masayoshi Okada; Assistant referees: Takeshi Ōkura, Masahiro Katagiri; Fourth official: Ichirō Inukai

20 August 1993 2nd-6	Urawa Red Diamonds	0–1	Yokohama Flügels	Urawa Komaba Stadium
19:00 JST (UTC+09)		J. League	Maeda 14'	Attendance: 9,267; Referee: Hideo Kikuchi; Assistant referees: Takashi Kunori, Naotsugu Fuse; Fourth official: Morihiko Yamaji

25 August 1993 2nd-7	Yokohama Flügels	0–1	Verdy Kawasaki	Tokyo National Stadium
19:03 JST (UTC+09)		J. League	Miura 44'	Attendance: 51,082; Referee: Kiyoshi Ōta; Assistant referees: Mitsuru Satō, Noboru Ishiyama; Fourth official: Tōru Kamikawa

28 August 1993 2nd-8	Gamba Osaka	0–0 (a.s.d.e.t.) (4–5 p)	Yokohama Flügels	Expo '70 Commemorative Stadium
19:01 JST (UTC+09)		J. League		Attendance: 21,330; Referee: Yōtarō Moritsu; Assistant referees: Yoshikazu Hiroshima, Kazuya Yanagisawa; Fourth official: Tsuyoshi Miyake
	Penalties
	(penalty scored) Wada; (penalty scored) Isogai; (penalty scored) Azuma; (penalty scored) Kudaka; (penalty missed) Nagashima		(penalty scored) Maeda; (penalty scored) Moner; (penalty scored) Watanabe; (penalty scored) Maezono; (penalty scored) Iwai

3 September 1993 2nd-9	Yokohama Flügels	3–2	Yokohama Marinos	Yokohama Mitsuzawa Football Stadium
19:03 JST (UTC+09)	Yamaguchi 3', 86'; 70' (o.g.)	J. League	Díaz 35', 69'	Attendance: 13,257; Referee: Masayoshi Okada; Assistant referees: Keiichi Sunakawa, Takashi Kunori; Fourth official: Kanichi Takahashi

6 November 1993 2nd-10	JEF United Ichihara	1–2 (a.s.d.e.t.)	Yokohama Flügels	Tokyo National Stadium
16:02 JST (UTC+09)	Pavel 33'	J. League	Maeda 80'; Edu 117'	Attendance: 45,748; Referee: Masayoshi Okada; Assistant referees: Noboru Ishiyama, Takeshi Ōkura; Fourth official: Katsuhiko Takayama

10 November 1993 2nd-11	Yokohama Flügels	1–0	Nagoya Grampus Eight	Nagasaki Stadium
19:04 JST (UTC+09)	Maezono 83'	J. League		Attendance: 13,205; Referee: Juan Carlos Crespi; Assistant referees: Masayoshi Okada, Hideaki Harada; Fourth official: Shigehisa Yamaguchi

13 November 1993 2nd-12	Shimizu S-Pulse	3–1	Yokohama Flügels	Kusanagi Athletic Stadium
15:31 JST (UTC+09)	Mukōjima 31', 69'; Miura 79'	J. League	Amarilla 44'	Attendance: 16,080; Referee: Shinichirō Obata; Assistant referees: Morihisa Yamaguchi, Yasushi Tsuchimoto; Fourth official: Masami Urayama

17 November 1993 2nd-13	Yokohama Flügels	2–3 (a.s.d.e.t.)	Kashima Antlers	Kumamoto Suizenji Stadium
19:01 JST (UTC+09)	Amarilla 48'; Edu 87' (pen.)	J. League	Zico 39'; Alcindo 75' (pen.); Manaka 114'	Attendance: 14,186; Referee: Kōetsu Kikuchi; Assistant referees: Hideaki Harada, Satoru Ishizawa; Fourth official: Tōru Yamashiro

20 November 1993 2nd-14	Yokohama Flügels	2–1	Urawa Red Diamonds	Kagoshima Kamoike Stadium
14:02 JST (UTC+09)	Amarilla 17'; Edu 73' (pen.)	J. League	Mizuuchi 14'	Attendance: 15,121; Referee: Kenji Tanaka; Assistant referees: Yū Nakamura, Mitsuru Satō; Fourth official: Shōji Hamada

27 November 1993 2nd-15	Verdy Kawasaki	3–0	Yokohama Flügels	Kawasaki Todoroki Stadium
19:04 JST (UTC+09)	Ramos 54'; Miura 74' (pen.); Bismarck 85'	J. League		Attendance: 10,299; Referee: Masahiro Sogawa; Assistant referees: Hiroshi Fukuda, Takeshi Ōkura; Fourth official: Jōji Kashihara

1 December 1993 2nd-16	Yokohama Flügels	0–1	Gamba Osaka	Nagasaki Stadium
19:04 JST (UTC+09)		J. League	Yamaguchi 54'	Attendance: 14,374; Referee: Juan Carlos Crespi; Assistant referees: Kazuya Yanagisawa, Hideaki Harada; Fourth official: Shigehisa Yamaguchi

8 December 1993 2nd-17	Yokohama Marinos	4–1	Yokohama Flügels	Yokohama Mitsuzawa Football Stadium
19:02 JST (UTC+09)	Díaz 11', 56', 79'; Everton 43'	J. League	Aldro 78'	Attendance: 13,024; Referee: Tetsuya Hamana; Assistant referees: Noboru Ishiyama, Kazuaki Hamaguchi; Fourth official: Takatoshi Itō

15 December 1993 2nd-18	Yokohama Flügels	1–2	Sanfrecce Hiroshima	Yokohama Mitsuzawa Football Stadium
19:04 JST (UTC+09)	Moner 89'	J. League	Černý 54'; Shima 71'	Attendance: 12,730; Referee: Kōetsu Kikuchi; Assistant referees: Keiichi Sunakawa, Kazuaki Hamaguchi; Fourth official: Masaki Yoshihara

=== Emperor's Cup ===
5 December 1993 1st Round	Yokohama Flügels	4–1	Tanabe Pharmaceutical	Yokohama Mitsuzawa Football Stadium
: JST (UTC+09)	Maeda ?'; Takada ?'; Moner ?'; Amarilla ?'		Kobachi ?'

11 December 1993 2nd Round	Yokohama Flügels	4–3 (a.e.t.)	Urawa Red Diamonds	Tochigi Utsunomiya Green Stadium
13:02 JST (UTC+09)	Maeda 2'; Edu 42', 71', 97'		Fukuda 4', 35'; Mizuuchi 11'	Attendance: 14,702; Referee: Masahiro Sogawa

19 December 1993 Quarterfinals	Yokohama Flügels	2–1	Verdy Kawasaki	Hakatanomori Athletic Stadium
: JST (UTC+09)	Maezono ?'; Maeda ?'		Miura ?'

23 December 1993 Semifinals	Sanfrecce Hiroshima	1–2 (a.e.t.)	Yokohama Flügels	Kobe Universiade Memorial Stadium
: JST (UTC+09)	Noh ?'		Maeda ?'; Moner ?'

1 January 1994 Final	Kashima Antlers	2–6 (a.e.t.)	Yokohama Flügels	Tokyo National Stadium
: JST (UTC+09)	Kurosaki 6'; Okuno 89'		Edu 44' (pen.), 63' (pen.); Watanabe 112'; Amarilla 115', 118'; Sorimachi 119'	Attendance: 53,540; Referee: Masayoshi Okada

=== J.League Cup ===
11 September 1993 GL-B-1	Yokohama Flügels	3–1	Yokohama Marinos	Yokohama Mitsuzawa Football Stadium
18:32 JST (UTC+09)	Edu 52', 70'; Aldro 87'	J. League	Díaz 15' (pen.)	Attendance: 13,419; Referee: Juan Carlos Crespi; Assistant referees: Kōetsu Kikuchi, Noboru Ishiyama; Fourth official: Toshiya Kumagai

GL-B-2	bye

18 September 1993 GL-B-3	Urawa Red Diamonds	1–1 (a.s.d.e.t.) (4–5 p)	Yokohama Flügels	Omiya Football Stadium
18:31 JST (UTC+09)	Kawano 55'	J. League	Aldro 59'	Attendance: 9,743; Referee: Tetsuya Hamana; Assistant referees: Toshiyuki Mayuzumi, Satoru Ishizawa; Fourth official: Hisaharu Kitamura
	Penalties
	(penalty missed) Hashiratani; (penalty scored) Hori; (penalty scored) Trivisonno; (penalty scored) Mochizuki; (penalty scored) Rahn; (penalty missed) Uehara		(penalty scored) Edu; (penalty scored) Moner; (penalty scored) Maeda; (penalty missed) Watanabe; (penalty scored) Iwai; (penalty scored) Maezono

25 September 1993 GL-B-4	Júbilo Iwata	2–2 (a.s.d.e.t.) (3–4 p)	Yokohama Flügels	Hamamatsu Stadium
14:00 JST (UTC+09)	20' (o.g.); Vanenburg 23'	J. League	Maeda 18'; Moner 44'	Attendance: 10,968; Referee: Tatsumi Ōno; Assistant referees: Mitsuru Satō, Yoshio Sawada; Fourth official: Tōru NAGATA
	Penalties
	(penalty scored) Carlos Alberto; (penalty scored) Vanenburg; (penalty scored) Walter; (penalty missed) Hi. Yoshida; (penalty missed) M. Endō		(penalty scored) Edu; (penalty scored) Moner; (penalty scored) Amarilla; (penalty missed) Maeda; (penalty scored) Iwai

2 October 1993 GL-B-5	Yokohama Flügels	2–1 (a.s.d.e.t.)	Shimizu S-Pulse	Tokyo National Stadium
18:32 JST (UTC+09)	Sorimachi 41'; Yamaguchi 109'	J. League	Iwashita 57'	Attendance: 50,222; Referee: Hideo Kikuchi; Assistant referees: Keiichi Sunakawa, Kimio Izaki; Fourth official: Susumu Takeda

GL-B-6	bye

16 October 1993 GL-B-7	Nagoya Grampus Eight	1–0 (a.s.d.e.t.)	Yokohama Flügels	Nagoya Minato Stadium
19:02 JST (UTC+09)	Pita 110'	J. League		Attendance: 14,560; Referee: Kenji Tanaka; Assistant referees: Kazuo Kakihana, Yoshimi Ogawa; Fourth official: Takayoshi Kashino

23 October 1993 Semifinals	Verdy Kawasaki	2–1 (a.s.d.e.t.)	Yokohama Flügels	Tokyo National Stadium
19:03 JST (UTC+09)	Fujiyoshi 41' 106'	J. League	Sorimachi 59'	Attendance: 50,633; Referee: Juan Carlos Crespi; Assistant referees: Tatsumi Ōno, Yū Nakamura; Fourth official: Naotsugu Fuse

== Player statistics ==
Pos.	Nat.	Player	D.o.B. (Age)	Height / Weight	J.League		Emperor's Cup		J.League Cup		Total	
Pos.	Nat.	Player	D.o.B. (Age)	Height / Weight	Apps	Goals	Apps	Goals	Apps	Goals	Apps	Goals
DF	(El Salvador)	Chelona	January 17, 1960 (aged 33)	185 cm / 80 kg	2	0	0	0	0	0	2	0
MF	(Brazil)	Edu	February 2, 1963 (aged 30)	180 cm / 75 kg	30	6	5	5	4	2	39	13
MF	(Japan)	Shinji Kobayashi	October 17, 1963 (aged 29)	170 cm / 61 kg	0	0		0	0	0		0
MF	(Japan)	Yasuharu Sorimachi	March 8, 1964 (aged 29)	173 cm / 64 kg	26	1	3	1	6	2	35	4
FW	(Japan)	Hitoshi Tomishima	June 1, 1964 (aged 28)	180 cm / 75 kg	12	1	0	0	0	0	12	1
GK	(Japan)	Ryūji Ishizue	July 22, 1964 (aged 28)	184 cm / 75 kg	0	0	1	0	0	0	1	0
DF	(Japan)	Naoto Hori	November 28, 1964 (aged 28)	183 cm / 73 kg	5	0	0	0	0	0	5	0
FW	(Brazil)	Angelo	August 10, 1965 (aged 27)	182 cm / 72 kg	13	3	0	0	0	0	13	3
FW	(Japan)	Osamu Maeda	September 5, 1965 (aged 27)	176 cm / 74 kg	32	10	5	4	6	1	43	15
DF	(Japan)	Atsuhiro Iwai	January 31, 1967 (aged 26)	177 cm / 66 kg	34	1	5	0	6	0	45	1
MF	(Japan)	Shunichi Ikenoue	February 16, 1967 (aged 26)	170 cm / 70 kg	1	0	0	0	0	0	1	0
MF	(Argentina)	Moner	December 30, 1967 (aged 25)	185 cm / 75 kg	29	3	4	2	5	1	38	6
FW	(Japan)	Takashi Kawamura	June 20, 1968 (aged 24)	186 cm / 80 kg	0	0		0	0	0		0
DF	(Japan)	Naoto Ōtake	October 18, 1968 (aged 24)	178 cm / 72 kg	33	0	5	0	0	0	38	0
MF	(Japan)	Motohiro Yamaguchi	January 29, 1969 (aged 24)	177 cm / 72 kg	35	3	4	0	6	1	45	4
MF	(Japan)	Shūta Sonoda	February 6, 1969 (aged 24)	170 cm / 65 kg	0	0		0	0	0		0
GK	(Japan)	Masahiko Nakagawa	August 26, 1969 (aged 23)	180 cm / 72 kg	0	0		0	0	0		0
DF	(Japan)	Ippei Watanabe	September 28, 1969 (aged 23)	184 cm / 80 kg	28	3	2	1	4	0	34	4
MF	(Japan)	Hideki Katsura	March 6, 1970 (aged 23)	160 cm / 58 kg	27	0	4	0	6	0	37	0
FW	(Japan)	Shūji Kusano	April 2, 1970 (aged 23)	179 cm / 73 kg	0	0		0	0	0		0
MF	(Japan)	Jun Naitō	December 18, 1970 (aged 22)	170 cm / 64 kg	0	0		0	0	0		0
GK	(Japan)	Hiroshi Satō	March 7, 1972 (aged 21)	181 cm / 74 kg	0	0		0	0	0		0
DF	(Japan)	Norihiro Satsukawa	April 18, 1972 (aged 21)	175 cm / 75 kg	20	0	4	0	5	0	29	0
MF/FW	(Japan)	Yoshiyuki Sakamoto	May 30, 1972 (aged 20)	170 cm / 65 kg	3	0	1	0	1	0	5	0
GK	(Japan)	Atsuhiko Mori	May 31, 1972 (aged 20)	179 cm / 73 kg	36	0	4	0	6	0	46	0
FW	(Japan)	Hideki Yoshioka	June 6, 1972 (aged 20)	178 cm / 72 kg	0	0		0	0	0		0
FW	(Brazil)	Aldro	July 30, 1972 (aged 20)	176 cm / 74 kg	15	5	0	0	3	2	18	7
MF	(Japan)	Manabu Umezawa	August 29, 1972 (aged 20)	170 cm / 63 kg	0	0		0	0	0		0
MF	(Japan)	Ichizō Nakata	April 19, 1973 (aged 20)	174 cm / 69 kg	5	0	1	0	3	0	9	0
DF	(Japan)	Keita Yoshizumi	April 24, 1973 (aged 20)	178 cm / 70 kg	0	0		0	0	0		0
MF	(Japan)	Akihiko Ichikawa	May 22, 1973 (aged 19)	174 cm / 66 kg	0	0		0	0	0		0
DF	(Japan)	Masaaki Takada	July 26, 1973 (aged 19)	182 cm / 76 kg	33	2	5	1	4	0	42	3
MF	(Japan)	Masakiyo Maezono	October 29, 1973 (aged 19)	170 cm / 63 kg	24	2	5	1	5	0	34	3
FW	(Japan)	Tomohiro Irie	November 14, 1973 (aged 19)	180 cm / 76 kg	0	0		0	0	0		0
FW	(Japan)	Takashi Uemura	December 2, 1973 (aged 19)	190 cm / 85 kg	0	0		0	0	0		0
DF	(Japan)	Nobuo Maruyama	April 5, 1974 (aged 19)	180 cm / 74 kg	0	0		0	0	0		0
FW	(Japan)	Satoru Ogata	April 5, 1974 (aged 19)	185 cm / 80 kg	0	0		0	0	0		0
DF	(Japan)	Nobuyuki Ōishi	May 23, 1974 (aged 18)	180 cm / 72 kg	0	0	0	0	1	0	1	0
MF	(Japan)	Satoshi Yoneyama	June 27, 1974 (aged 18)	171 cm / 65 kg	0	0		0	0	0		0
FW	(Japan)	Seiichirō Okuno	July 26, 1974 (aged 18)	180 cm / 68 kg	0	0		0	0	0		0
FW	(Japan)	Hideaki Kaetsu	October 8, 1974 (aged 18)	177 cm / 62 kg	0	0		0	0	0		0
FW	(Japan)	Makoto Segawa	November 26, 1974 (aged 18)	166 cm / 62 kg	0	0		0	0	0		0
FW	(Paraguay)	Amarilla †	July 19, 1960 (aged 32)	cm / - kg	7	3	5	3	4	0	16	6

- † player(s) joined the team after the opening of this season.

== Transfers ==
In:

No.	Pos.	Nation	Player
—	MF	BRA	Edu (from Palmeiras)
—	FW	BRA	Angelo (from XV de Jaú)
—	DF	JPN	Nobuyuki Ōishi (from Yokkaichi Chuo Technical High School)
—	DF	JPN	Nobuo Maruyama (from Yamashiro High School)
—	DF	ARG	Fernando Moner (from Los Epenes)
—	FW	JPN	Shūji Kusano (from Sendai College)
—	FW	JPN	Makoto Segawa (from Sendai Ikuei Gakuen High School)
—	FW	JPN	Hideaki Kaetsu (from Utsunomiya Gakuen High School)
—	FW	JPN	Satoru Ogata (from Yonezawa Chuo Senior High School)
—	FW	JPN	Satoshi Yoneyama (from Shichirigahama Senior High School)
—	FW	JPN	Seiichirō Okuno (from Maruoka High School)
—	FW	BRA	Aldro (from S. E. Matsubara)

Out:

No.	Pos.	Nation	Player
—	DF	JPN	Yoshinori Taguchi (to Sanfrecce Hiroshima)
—	MF	JPN	Musashi Mizushima
—	MF	SVN	Alfred Jermaniš
—	FW	SVN	Primož Gliha
—	DF	JPN	Tadaaki Kawahara

== Transfers during the season ==
=== In ===
- (Paraguay) Amarilla (lone from Olimpia on September)

== Other pages ==
- (in Japanese) J. League official site
- (in Japanese) Yokohama F. Marinos official web site
