= Masahiko Nakagawa =

Japanese footballer (born 1969)

Masahiko Nakagawa 中河 昌彦
Personal information
- Full name: Masahiko Nakagawa
- Date of birth: August 26, 1969 (age 57)
- Place of birth: Osaka, Japan
- Height: 1.80 m (5 ft 11 in)
- Position: Goalkeeper

Youth career
- 1985–1987: Kyoto Commercial High School
- 1988–1991: Kokushikan University

Senior career*
Years	Team	Apps	(Gls)
1992–1995	Yokohama Flügels	0	(0)
1995–1997	Yokohama Marinos	16	(0)
1998–2002	Kyoto Purple Sanga	30	(0)
2000	→Nagoya Grampus Eight (loan)	0	(0)
Total		46	(0)
Medal record
Yokohama Flügels
Winner	Emperor's Cup	1993
Yokohama Marinos
Winner	J1 League	1995
Kyoto Purple Sanga
Winner	Emperor's Cup	2002
- * Club domestic league appearances and goals

Masahiko Nakagawa (中河 昌彦, Nakagawa Masahiko; born August 26, 1969) is a former Japanese football player.

== Playing career ==
Nakagawa was born in Osaka Prefecture on August 26, 1969. After graduating from Kokushikan University, he joined Yokohama Flügels in 1992. However he could hardly play in the match behind Atsuhiko Mori. In June 1995, he moved to rival club in Yokohama, Yokohama Marinos. In 1996, he played many matches when regular goalkeeper Yoshikatsu Kawaguchi let the club for 1996 Summer Olympics and injury. In 1998, he moved to Kyoto Purple Sanga. However he could hardly play in the match behind Shigetatsu Matsunaga. In March 2000, he moved to Nagoya Grampus Eight on loan. In 2001, he returned to Purple Sanga was relegated to J2 League. From June, he became a regular goalkeeper and the club returned to J1 League in a season. However he could hardly play in the match in 2002 season and retired end of 2002 season.

== Career statistics ==
Appearances and goals by club, season and competition
Club	Season	League			Emperor's Cup		J.League Cup		Total	
Club	Season	Division	Apps	Goals	Apps	Goals	Apps	Goals	Apps	Goals
Yokohama Flügels	1992	J1 League	—		2	0	4	0	6	0
Yokohama Flügels	1993	J1 League	0	0	0	0	0	0	0	0
Yokohama Flügels	1994	J1 League	0	0	0	0	0	0	0	0
Yokohama Flügels	1995	J1 League	0	0	0	0	—		0	0
Yokohama Marinos	1995	J1 League	0	0	0	0	—		0	0
Yokohama Marinos	1996	J1 League	16	0	1	0	1	0	18	0
Yokohama Marinos	1997	J1 League	0	0	0	0	6	0	6	0
Kyoto Purple Sanga	1998	J1 League	0	0	0	0	0	0	0	0
Kyoto Purple Sanga	1999	J1 League	0	0	0	0	1	0	1	0
Kyoto Purple Sanga	2000	J1 League	0	0	0	0	0	0	0	0
Nagoya Grampus Eight	2000	J1 League	0	0	0	0	0	0	0	0
Kyoto Purple Sanga	2001	J2 League	29	0	0	0	2	0	31	0
Kyoto Purple Sanga	2002	J1 League	1	0	0	0	0	0	1	0
Career total			46	0	3	0	14	0	63	0
