= Hideki Katsura =

Japanese footballer (born 1970)

Hideki Katsura 桂 秀樹
Personal information
- Full name: Hideki Katsura
- Date of birth: March 6, 1970 (age 56)
- Place of birth: Tokushima, Japan
- Height: 1.60 m (5 ft 3 in)
- Position: Midfielder

Youth career
- 1985–1987: Tokushima High School
- 1988–1991: Osaka University of Health and Sport Sciences

Senior career*
Years	Team	Apps	(Gls)
1992–1996	Yokohama Flügels	59	(2)
1997–2001	Kawasaki Frontale	65	(6)
2002–2003	Sagawa Express Tokyo SC		
Total		124	(8)
Medal record
Yokohama Flügels
Winner	Emperor's Cup	1993
Kawasaki Frontale
Runner-up	J.League Cup	2000
- * Club domestic league appearances and goals

Hideki Katsura (桂 秀樹, Katsura Hideki; born March 6, 1970) is a former Japanese football player.

== Playing career ==
Katsura was born in Tokushima Prefecture on March 6, 1970. After graduating from Osaka University of Health and Sport Sciences, he joined Yokohama Flügels in 1992. He played many matches as midfielder since 1993. However, his opportunity to play decreased from 1995 and he moved to the Japan Football League club Kawasaki Frontale in 1997. He played many matches and the club was promoted to J2 League in 1999 and J1 League in 2000. However, he could not play at all in the match since 2000. In 2002, he moved to the Japan Football League club Sagawa Express Tokyo SC. He retired at end of the season 2003.

== Career statistics ==
Appearances and goals by club, season and competition
Club	Season	League			Emperor's Cup		J.League Cup		Total	
Club	Season	Division	Apps	Goals	Apps	Goals	Apps	Goals	Apps	Goals
Yokohama Flügels	1992	J1 League	—				0	0	0	0
Yokohama Flügels	1993	J1 League	27	0	4	0	6	0	37	0
Yokohama Flügels	1994	J1 League	23	2	2	0	1	0	26	2
Yokohama Flügels	1995	J1 League	8	0	2	0	—		10	0
Yokohama Flügels	1996	J1 League	1	0	0	0	0	0	1	0
Kawasaki Frontale	1997	Football League	19	2	3	2	—		22	4
Kawasaki Frontale	1998	Football League	18	1	1	0	2	0	21	1
Kawasaki Frontale	1999	J2 League	27	3	2	0	0	0	29	3
Kawasaki Frontale	2000	J1 League	0	0			0	0	0	0
Kawasaki Frontale	2001	J2 League	1	0	4	1	2	0	7	1
Career total			124	8	18	3	11	0	153	11
