= Atsuhiko Mori =

Japanese footballer

Atsuhiko Mori 森 敦彦
Personal information
- Full name: Atsuhiko Mori
- Date of birth: May 31, 1972 (age 54)
- Place of birth: Hyogo, Japan
- Height: 1.79 m (5 ft 10 1/2 in)
- Position: Goalkeeper

Youth career
- 1988–1990: Takigawa Daini High School

Senior career*
Years	Team	Apps	(Gls)
1991–1997	Yokohama Flügels	107	(0)
1997	Consadole Sapporo	5	(0)
Total		112	(0)
Medal record
Yokohama Flügels
Winner	Emperor's Cup	1993
Runner-up	Emperor's Cup	1997
- * Club domestic league appearances and goals

Atsuhiko Mori (森 敦彦, Mori Atsuhiko; born May 31, 1972) is a former Japanese professional football player. He played as a goalkeeper, most notably with Yokohama Flügels from 1991 to 1997.

== Playing career ==
=== Yokohama Flugels (1991–1997) ===
Mori was born in Hyogo Prefecture on May 31, 1972. After graduating from high school, he joined All Nippon Airways (later renamed to Yokohama Flügels) in 1991. Upon the clubs election to the J League as founding members in 1993, Mori was the club's regular goalkeeper and became recognisable and popular for his dreadlocked hair among the club's supporters, who nicknamed him "Reggae-kun". He kept 5 clean sheets in the inaugural J League season as the Flügels finished 6th, reached the semi-finals of the J League Cup, and won the 1993 Emperor's Cup, as well as the 1994–95 Asian Cup Winners' Cup, with his performances eventually leading to talks of a national team call-up, however, Mori's career ground to a halt on August 12, 1995, after an incident during a 6–0 loss to Urawa Red Diamonds. Dissatisfied with the referee, Mori intentionally barged his shoulder against the official and was subsequently sent off and handed a three-month suspension, during which rookie goalkeeper Seigo Narazaki took his place in goal and eventually became the favoured #1 for the Flügels.

=== Consadole Sapporo (1997) ===
Mori briefly returned to the side during the 1996-97 season, but never regained his regular starting position and was transferred to Japan Football League club Consadole Sapporo in April 1997. Mori was unable to overtake Dido Havenaar as the club's first choice and played just 5 times, before retiring upon the end of the season at the age of 25.

== Personal life ==
Mori married model and fashion designer Misaki in 1995. The two have a daughter, born in 1996.

Mori became a fan of reggae music and Jamaican culture in the early 1990s, particularly Bob Marley and The Wailers; he reflected this on the field with dreadlocked hair during his early career.

After his retirement from football, Mori opened a bar called "Rock Steady" in Tokyo. Mori often works in the bar as a DJ, mainly playing reggae, ska, funk, rock-a-billy, and blues.

In 2005, Mori founded the fashion brand "Wacko Maria" with fellow former professional footballer Keiji Ishizuka.

== Club statistics ==
Club performance			League		Cup		League Cup		Total	
Season	Club	League	Apps	Goals	Apps	Goals	Apps	Goals	Apps	Goals
Japan			League		Emperor's Cup		J.League Cup		Total	
1991/92	All Nippon Airways	JSL Division 1	0	0			0	0	0	0
1992	Yokohama Flügels	J1 League	-		0	0	0	0	0	0
1993	Yokohama Flügels	J1 League	36	0	4	0	6	0	46	0
1994	Yokohama Flügels	J1 League	37	0	2	0	1	0	40	0
1995	Yokohama Flügels	J1 League	27	0	0	0	-		27	0
1996	Yokohama Flügels	J1 League	7	0	0	0	0	0	7	0
1997	Yokohama Flügels	J1 League	0	0	0	0	0	0	0	0
1997	Consadole Sapporo	Football League	5	0	0	0	-		5	0
Total			112	0	6	0	7	0	125	0
