= Osamu Maeda =

Japanese footballer

Osamu Maeda 前田 治
Personal information
- Full name: Osamu Maeda
- Date of birth: September 5, 1965 (age 61)
- Place of birth: Fukuoka, Fukuoka, Japan
- Height: 1.76 m (5 ft 9 1/2 in)
- Position: Forward

Youth career
- 1981–1983: Teikyo High School
- 1984–1987: Tokai University

Senior career*
Years	Team	Apps	(Gls)
1988–1996	Yokohama Flügels	164	(45)
Total		164	(45)

International career
1988–1989	Japan	14	(6)
Medal record
Yokohama Flügels
Runner-up	Japan Soccer League	1988/89
Winner	Emperor's Cup	1993
- * Club domestic league appearances and goals

Osamu Maeda (前田 治, Maeda Osamu; born September 5, 1965) is a former Japanese football player. He played for Japan national team.

== Club career ==
Maeda was born in Fukuoka on September 5, 1965. After graduating from Tokai University, he joined All Nippon Airways (later Yokohama Flügels) in 1988. In First season, the club won the 2nd place and he was selected Best Eleven. In 1993, the club won Emperor's Cup. In Asia, the club won 1994–95 Asian Cup Winners' Cup and 1995 Asian Super Cup. He retired in 1996.

== National team career ==
On January 27, 1988, Maeda debuted for Japan national team against United Arab Emirates. He played as regular player, and also played at 1990 World Cup qualification. He played 14 games and scored 6 goals for Japan until 1989.

== Club statistics ==
Club performance			League		Cup		League Cup		Total	
Season	Club	League	Apps	Goals	Apps	Goals	Apps	Goals	Apps	Goals
Japan			League		Emperor's Cup		J.League Cup		Total	
1988/89	All Nippon Airways	JSL Division 1	22	10					22	10
1989/90	All Nippon Airways	JSL Division 1	16	3			3	1	19	4
1990/91	All Nippon Airways	JSL Division 1	16	3			4	1	20	4
1991/92	All Nippon Airways	JSL Division 1	7	0			1	0	8	0
1992	Yokohama Flügels	J1 League	-				9	3	9	3
1993	Yokohama Flügels	J1 League	32	10	5	4	6	1	43	15
1994	Yokohama Flügels	J1 League	39	11	2	0	2	0	43	11
1995	Yokohama Flügels	J1 League	29	8	2	0	-		31	8
1996	Yokohama Flügels	J1 League	3	0	0	0	4	0	7	0
Total			164	45	9	4	29	6	202	55

== National team statistics ==
Japan national team
Year	Apps	Goals
1988	5	1
1989	9	5
Total	14	6
