= Shuta Sonoda =

Japanese footballer and manager

Shuta Sonoda 其田 秀太
Personal information
- Full name: Shuta Sonoda
- Date of birth: February 6, 1969 (age 57)
- Place of birth: Nagasaki, Japan
- Height: 1.70 m (5 ft 7 in)
- Position: Midfielder

Youth career
- Kunimi High School

Senior career*
| Years | Team | Apps | (Gls) |
| 1988–1993 | Yokohama Flügels | 63 | (10) |
| 1994–1996 | Avispa Fukuoka | 71 | (6) |
| 1997–1999 | Sagawa Express Tokyo | 0 | (0) |
| Total | | 134 | (16) |

Managerial career
- 2004: Sagawa Express Tokyo
Medal record
All Nippon Airways
| Runner-up | Japan Soccer League | 1988/89 |
| Winner | Emperor's Cup | 1993 |
- * Club domestic league appearances and goals

Shuta Sonoda (其田 秀太, Sonoda Shuta; born February 6, 1969) is a former Japanese football player and manager.

== Playing career ==
Sonoda was born in Nagasaki Prefecture on February 6, 1969. After graduating from high school, he joined All Nippon Airways in 1988. He played many matches as offensive midfielder from first season. However his opportunity to play decreased from 1991 under new manager Shu Kamo and he could not play at all in the match from 1992. In 1994, he moved to Japan Football League club Fujieda Blux (later Fukuoka Blux, Avispa Fukuoka). He played as regular player and the club won the champions 1995 and was promoted to J1 League. In 1997, he moved to Sagawa Express Tokyo. However could not play at all in the match and retired end of 1999 season.

== Coaching career ==
After retirement, Sonoda became a coach for Sagawa Express Tokyo in 2000. In 2004, he became a manager and managed the club in 1 season.

== Club statistics ==
| Club performance | | | League | | Cup | | League Cup | | Total | |
| Season | Club | League | Apps | Goals | Apps | Goals | Apps | Goals | Apps | Goals |
| Japan | | | League | | Emperor's Cup | | J.League Cup | | Total | |
|---|---|---|---|---|---|---|---|---|---|---|
| 1988/89 | All Nippon Airways | JSL Division 1 | 17 | 1 | | | | | | |
| 1989/90 | All Nippon Airways | JSL Division 1 | 19 | 5 | | | 3 | 1 | 22 | 6 |
| 1990/91 | All Nippon Airways | JSL Division 1 | 16 | 3 | | | 0 | 0 | 16 | 3 |
| 1991/92 | All Nippon Airways | JSL Division 1 | 11 | 1 | | | 0 | 0 | 11 | 1 |
| 1992 | Yokohama Flügels | J1 League | - | | | | 0 | 0 | 0 | 0 |
| 1993 | Yokohama Flügels | J1 League | 0 | 0 | 0 | 0 | 0 | 0 | 0 | 0 |
| 1994 | Fujieda Blux | Football League | 27 | 5 | 0 | 0 | - | | 27 | 5 |
| 1995 | Fukuoka Blux | Football League | 27 | 0 | 3 | 0 | - | | 30 | 0 |
| 1996 | Avispa Fukuoka | J1 League | 17 | 1 | 2 | 1 | 13 | 0 | 32 | 2 |
| 1997 | Sagawa Express Tokyo | Football League | 0 | 0 | - | | - | | 0 | 0 |
| 1998 | Sagawa Express Tokyo | Football League | 0 | 0 | - | | - | | 0 | 0 |
| 1999 | Sagawa Express Tokyo | Football League | 0 | 0 | - | | - | | 0 | 0 |
| Total | | | 134 | 16 | 5 | 1 | 16 | 1 | 155 | 18 |
