= Ippei Watanabe (footballer) =

Japanese footballer

Ippei Watanabe 渡辺 一平
Personal information
- Full name: Ippei Watanabe
- Date of birth: September 28, 1969 (age 57)
- Place of birth: Nagoya, Aichi, Japan
- Height: 1.83 m (6 ft 0 in)
- Position: Defender

Youth career
- 1985–1987: Chukyo University Chukyo High School
- 1988–1991: Osaka University of Commerce

Senior career*
Years	Team	Apps	(Gls)
1992–1995	Yokohama Flügels	69	(5)
1996	Júbilo Iwata	0	(0)
1997	Vissel Kobe	18	(0)
1998	Mito HollyHock	7	(1)
1999–2000	Yokohama FC	24	(2)
Total		118	(8)
Medal record
Yokohama Flügels
Winner	Emperor's Cup	1993
- * Club domestic league appearances and goals

Ippei Watanabe (渡辺 一平, Watanabe Ippei; born September 28, 1969) is a former Japanese football player.

== Playing career ==
Watanabe was born in Nagoya on September 28, 1969. After graduating from Osaka University of Commerce, he joined Yokohama Flügels in 1992. He played many matches as center back. In 1993 season, the club won the champions 1993 Emperor's Cup their first major title. At Final, he scored a winning goal in extra time. In 1995, the club won the champions 1994–95 Asian Cup Winners' Cup their first Asian title. At final, he scored 2 goals. In 1996, he moved to Júbilo Iwata. However he could not play at all in the match and he moved to newly was promoted to J1 League club, Vissel Kobe in 1997. From 1998, he played for Mito HollyHock (1998) and Yokohama FC (1999-2000). At Yokohama FC, the club won the champions for 2 years in a row (1999-2000) and was promoted to J2 League end of 2000 season. He retired end of 2000 season.

== Career statistics ==
Appearances and goals by club, season and competition
Club	Season	League			Emperor's Cup		J.League Cup		Total	
Club	Season	Division	Apps	Goals	Apps	Goals	Apps	Goals	Apps	Goals
Yokohama Flügels	1992	J1 League	—				0	0	0	0
Yokohama Flügels	1993	J1 League	28	3	2	1	4	0	34	4
Yokohama Flügels	1994	J1 League	16	1	0	0	2	1	18	2
Yokohama Flügels	1995	J1 League	25	1	0	0	—		25	1
Júbilo Iwata	1996	J1 League	0	0	0	0	0	0	0	0
Vissel Kobe	1997	J1 League	18	0	0	0	2	0	20	0
Mito HollyHock	1998	Football League	7	1	0	0	—		7	1
Yokohama FC	1999	Football League	9	1	3	1	—		12	2
Yokohama FC	2000	Football League	15	1	2	0	—		17	1
Career total			118	8	7	2	8	1	133	11
