= Atsuhiro Iwai =

Japanese footballer

Atsuhiro Iwai 岩井 厚裕
Personal information
- Full name: Atsuhiro Iwai
- Date of birth: January 31, 1967 (age 59)
- Place of birth: Saitama, Japan
- Height: 1.77 m (5 ft 9 1/2 in)
- Position: Defender

Youth career
- 1982–1984: Teikyo High School
- 1985–1988: Tokai University

Senior career*
Years	Team	Apps	(Gls)
1989–1995	Yokohama Flügels	170	(1)
1996–1998	Avispa Fukuoka	60	(1)
Total		230	(2)
Medal record
Yokohama Flügels
Winner	Emperor's Cup	1993
- * Club domestic league appearances and goals

Atsuhiro Iwai (岩井 厚裕, Iwai Atsuhiro; born January 31, 1967) is a former Japanese football player.

== Playing career ==
Iwai was born in Saitama Prefecture on January 31, 1967. After graduating from Tokai University, he joined All Nippon Airways (later Yokohama Flügels) in 1989. He became a regular player as center back for the first season. The club won the championship at the 1993 Emperor's Cup and 1994–95 Asian Cup Winners' Cup. In 1996, he moved to the newly promoted J1 League club, Avispa Fukuoka. He retired at the end of the 1998 season.

== Club statistics ==
Club performance			League		Cup		League Cup		Total	
Season	Club	League	Apps	Goals	Apps	Goals	Apps	Goals	Apps	Goals
Japan			League		Emperor's Cup		J.League Cup		Total	
1989/90	All Nippon Airways	JSL Division 1	22	0			3	0	25	0
1990/91	All Nippon Airways	JSL Division 1	19	0			4	0	23	0
1991/92	All Nippon Airways	JSL Division 1	19	0			0	0	19	0
1992	Yokohama Flügels	J1 League	-				9	0	9	0
1993	Yokohama Flügels	J1 League	34	1	5	0	6	0	45	1
1994	Yokohama Flügels	J1 League	38	0	2	0	0	0	40	0
1995	Yokohama Flügels	J1 League	38	0	0	0	-		38	0
1996	Avispa Fukuoka	J1 League	20	0	2	0	14	0	36	0
1997	Avispa Fukuoka	J1 League	8	0	3	0	0	0	11	0
1998	Avispa Fukuoka	J1 League	32	1	3	0	4	0	39	1
Total			230	2	15	0	40	0	285	2
