= Shunichi Ikenoue =

Japanese footballer

Shunichi Ikenoue 池ノ上 俊一
Personal information
- Full name: Shunichi Ikenoue
- Date of birth: February 16, 1967 (age 59)
- Place of birth: Gunma, Japan
- Height: 1.70 m (5 ft 7 in)
- Position: Midfielder

Youth career
- 1982–1984: Kagoshima Commercial High School
- 1985–1988: Osaka University of Commerce

Senior career*
Years	Team	Apps	(Gls)
1989–1990	Matsushita Electric	14	(2)
1990–1993	Yokohama Flügels	33	(3)
1994–1995	Tosu Futures	25	(2)
Total		72	(7)
Medal record
Yokohama Flügels
Winner	Emperor's Cup	1993
- * Club domestic league appearances and goals

Shunichi Ikenoue (池ノ上 俊一, Ikenoue Shunichi; born February 16, 1967) is a former Japanese football player.

== Club career ==
Ikenoue was born in Gunma Prefecture on February 16, 1967. After graduating from Osaka University of Commerce, he joined Matsushita Electric in 1989. He played many matches as offensive midfielder. In 1990, he moved to All Nippon Airways (later Yokohama Flügels). However he did not play as much in 1993. In 1994, he moved to Japan Football League club PJM Futures (later Tosu Futures). He retired at the end of the 1995 season.

== National team career ==
In 1988, when Ikenoue was an Osaka University of Commerce student, he was selected for the Japan national "B team" for the 1988 Asian Cup. At that competition, he played two games. However, the Japan Football Association does not count that as a Japan national team match because he played for the "B team," and not the "top team."

== Career statistics ==
Appearances and goals by club, season and competition
Club	Season	League			Emperor's Cup		J.League Cup		Total	
Club	Season	Division	Apps	Goals	Apps	Goals	Apps	Goals	Apps	Goals
Matsushita Electric	1989–90	JSL Division 1	14	2			0	0	14	2
All Nippon Airways	1990–91	JSL Division 1	14	1			4	0	18	1
All Nippon Airways	1991–92	JSL Division 1	18	2			1	0	19	2
Yokohama Flügels	1992	J1 League	-				9	2	9	2
Yokohama Flügels	1993	J1 League	1	0	0	0	0	0	1	0
PJM Futures	1994	Football League	14	0	1	0	-		15	0
Tosu Futures	1995	Football League	11	2	0	0	-		11	2
Career total			72	7	1	0	14	2	87	10
