= Aldro (footballer) =

Brazilian footballer (born 1972)

Personal information
- Full name: Aldrovani Menon
- Date of birth: 30 July 1972 (age 54)
- Place of birth: Brazil
- Height: 1.76 m (5 ft 9 1/2 in)
- Position: Striker

Senior career*
Years	Team	Apps	(Gls)
1990–1992	Matsubara		
1993–1994	Yokohama Flügels		
1995–1997	NEC Yamagata		
1997	Ceará		
1997	Ponta Grossa		
1998	Juventus-SP		
1999–2000	Figueirense		
2000	Bahia		
2000–2001	Figueirense		
2001	Sport		
2001	Juventude		
2002	Paulista		
2002	Caxias de Joinville		
2002	Glória		
2002	Vila Nova		
2003	Paysandu		
2004	Goiás		
2005	Náutico		
2005	15 de Novembro		
2005	Caxias		
2006	Paysandu		
2006	Itumbiara		
2006	Sertãozinho		
2007	Santa Helena		
2008	Metropolitano		
2008	Jataiense		
2008	Gurupi		
2009	Rio Verde		
- * Club domestic league appearances and goals

Aldrovani Menon (born 30 July 1972), known as Aldro, is a former retired Brazilian football player.

== Career ==
He joined Japanese J1 League club Yokohama Flügels in 1993. He played many matches as forward in 1993 season. However he could not play many matches in 1994 and left the club end of 1994 season. In 1995, he moved to Japan Football League club NEC Yamagata. He played for Yamagata until 1997.

== Club statistics ==
Club performance			League		Cup		League Cup		Total	
Season	Club	League	Apps	Goals	Apps	Goals	Apps	Goals	Apps	Goals
Japan			League		Emperor's Cup		J.League Cup		Total	
1993	Yokohama Flügels	J1 League	15	5	0	0	3	2	18	7
1994	Yokohama Flügels	J1 League	6	2	2	1	1	0	9	3
Total			21	7	2	1	4	2	27	10

== Honours ==
Yokohama Flügels

- J1 League: 1993
- Emperor's Cup: 1993

Paraná

- Campeonato Paranaense: 1995

Figueirense

- Campeonato Catarinense: 1999

Santa Helena

- Campeonato Goiano Série B: 2006

Rio Verde

- Campeonato Goiano Série B: 2009
