= Válber (footballer, born 1971) =

Brazilian footballer

Personal information
- Full name: Válber da Silva Costa
- Date of birth: 6 December 1971 (age 54)
- Place of birth: São Luís, Brazil
- Height: 1.77 m (5 ft 9 1/2 in)
- Position: Striker

Senior career*
Years	Team	Apps	(Gls)
1992	Mogi Mirim		
1993	Corinthians		
1994	Yokohama Flügels		
1995	Palmeiras		
1996	Internacional		
1996	Vasco da Gama		
1997	Yokohama Flügels		
1998	Goiás		
1998	Ponte Preta		
1999	Yokohama F. Marinos		
2000–2001	Atlético Paranaense		
2001–2003	Mogi Mirim		
2003	Santa Cruz		
2004	Mogi Mirim		

International career
1993	Brazil	1	(0)
- * Club domestic league appearances and goals

Válber da Silva Costa (born 6 December 1971), better known as just Válber, is a former Brazilian football player. He made one appearance for the Brazil national team in 1993.

== Club statistics ==
Club performance			League		Cup		League Cup		Total	
Season	Club	League	Apps	Goals	Apps	Goals	Apps	Goals	Apps	Goals
Japan			League		Emperor's Cup		J.League Cup		Total	
1994	Yokohama Flügels	J1 League	32	11	2	0	1	0	35	11
1997	Yokohama Flügels	J1 League	31	20	0	0	10	5	41	25
1999	Yokohama F. Marinos	J1 League	17	4	3	1	4	1	24	6
Total			80	35	5	1	15	6	100	42
