= Edu Marangon =

Brazilian footballer and manager (born 1963)

Personal information
- Full name: Carlos Eduardo Marangon
- Date of birth: 2 February 1963 (age 63)
- Place of birth: São Paulo, Brazil
- Height: 1.80 m (5 ft 11 in)
- Position: Midfielder

Senior career*
Years	Team	Apps	(Gls)
1984–1988	Portuguesa	55	(7)
1988–1989	Torino	22	(2)
1989–1990	Porto	2	(0)
1990	Flamengo	0	(0)
1990–1991	Santos	24	(3)
1991–1992	Palmeiras	16	(3)
1992	Santos	0	(0)
1993–1994	Yokohama Flügels	67	(18)
1995–1996	Nacional		
1996	Coritiba	9	(1)
1997	Inter de Limeira	0	(0)
1997	Bragantino		

International career
1987–1990	Brazil	9	(1)

Managerial career
- 1999: Inter de Limeira
- 2002: Portuguesa U20
- 2002: Portuguesa
- 2003: América-SP
- 2003: Paraná
- 2004: Vila Nova
- 2005: Juventus-SP
- 2006: Portuguesa Santista
- 2007: Juventus-SP
- 2007: Guaratinguetá
- 2008: Rio Claro
- 2009: Juventus-SP
- 2010: Atlético Sorocaba
- 2010: Sport Barueri
Medal record
Men's football
Representing Brazil
Pan American Games
Gold medal – first place	1987 Indianapolis	Team competition
- * Club domestic league appearances and goals

Carlos Eduardo Marangon (born 2 February 1963), best known as Edu Marangon or as Edu, is a retired Brazilian football player and manager, who played as a midfielder.

== Playing career ==
Edu Marangon started his career with Portuguesa, joining Flamengo, after a spell with Italian club Torino. He played 15 games for Flamengo. Edu Marangon played 54 games and scored nine goals as a Palmeiras player.

After leaving Santos, he played 2 years in the J.League with Yokohama Flügels. On 1 January 1994, he scored twice and provided two assists in a 6-2 win over Kashima Antlers in the final of the Emperor's Cup.

== Managerial career ==
He started a managerial career in 1999, as Internacional-SP manager. He managed Paraná Clube in 2003, Juventus in 2005, 2007, and 2009, and Rio Claro in 2008.

== Career statistics ==
=== Club ===
Club performance			League		Cup		League Cup		Total	
Season	Club	League	Apps	Goals	Apps	Goals	Apps	Goals	Apps	Goals
Brazil			League		Copa do Brasil		League Cup		Total	
1984	Portuguesa Desportos	Campeonato Paulista	?	2					?	2
1984	Portuguesa Desportos	Série A	4	0					4	0
1985	Portuguesa Desportos	Campeonato Paulista	?	4					?	4
1985	Portuguesa Desportos	Série A	19	2					19	2
1986	Portuguesa Desportos	Campeonato Paulista	?	4					?	4
1986	Portuguesa Desportos	Série A	21	1					21	1
1987	Portuguesa Desportos	Campeonato Paulista	?	1					?	1
1987	Portuguesa Desportos	Série A	10	4					10	4
1988	Portuguesa Desportos	Campeonato Paulista	?	2					?	2
1988	Portuguesa Desportos	Série A	1	0					1	0
Italy			League		Coppa Italia		League Cup		Total	
1988–89	Torino	Serie A	22	2					22	2
Portugal			League		Taça de Portugal		Taça da Liga		Total	
1989–90	Porto	Primeira Divisão	2	0					2	0
Brazil			League		Copa do Brasil		League Cup		Total	
1990	Flamengo	Campeonato Carioca	14	2					?	2
1990	Santos	Série A	10	1					10	1
1991	Santos	Série A	14	2					14	2
1991	Palmeiras	Campeonato Paulista	?	4					?	4
1992	Palmeiras	Série A	16	3					16	3
1992	Santos	Campeonato Paulista	?	1					?	1
Japan			League		Emperor's Cup		J.League Cup		Total	
1993	Yokohama Flügels	J1 League	30	6	5	5	4	2	39	13
1994	Yokohama Flügels	J1 League	37	12	0	0	2	0	39	12
Uruguay			League		Cup		League Cup		Total	
1995	Nacional	Primera División	?	?					?	?
Brazil			League		Copa do Brasil		League Cup		Total	
1996	Coritiba	Campeonato Paranaense	?	0					?	0
1996	Coritiba	Série A	9	1					9	1
1997	Inter de Limeira	Campeonato Paulista	?	1					?	1
1997	Bragantino	Série A	?	?					?	?
Country	Brazil national		104	14					104	14
Country	Brazil States		?	21					?	21
Country	Italy		22	2					22	2
Country	Portugal		2	0					2	0
Country	Japan		67	18	5	5	6	2	78	25
Country	Uruguay		?	?					?	?
Total national			195	34	5	5	6	2	206	41
Total (with Brazil States)			195+	55	5	5	6	2	206+	62

=== International ===
Brazil national team
Year	Apps	Goals
1987	8	1
1988	0	0
1989	0	0
1990	1	0
Total	9	1
