= Hitoshi Tomishima =

Japanese footballer

Hitoshi Tomishima 冨嶋 均
Personal information
- Full name: Hitoshi Tomishima
- Date of birth: June 1, 1964 (age 62)
- Place of birth: Kumamoto, Japan
- Height: 1.82 m (5 ft 11 1/2 in)
- Position: Forward

Youth career
- 1980–1982: Kyushu Gakuin High School
- 1983–1986: Fukuoka University

Senior career*
Years	Team	Apps	(Gls)
1987–1993	Yokohama Flügels	101	(19)
1994–1995	Fukuoka Blux	0	(0)
Total		101	(19)
Medal record
Yokohama Flügels
Runner-up	Japan Soccer League	1988/89
Winner	Emperor's Cup	1993
- * Club domestic league appearances and goals

Hitoshi Tomishima (冨嶋 均, Tomishima Hitoshi; born June 1, 1964) is a former Japanese football player.

== Playing career ==
Tomishima was born in Kumamoto Prefecture on June 1, 1964. After graduating from Fukuoka University, he joined Japan Soccer League Division 2 club All Nippon Airways (later Yokohama Flügels) in 1987. He played many matches as forward and the club was promoted to Division 1 in 1988. In 1992, Japan Soccer League was folded and founded new league J1 League. However his opportunity to play decreased in 1993 and he moved to Japan Football League club Fujieda Blux (later Fukuoka Blux). However he could not play at all in the match and retired end of 1995 season.

== Club statistics ==
Club performance			League		Cup		League Cup		Total	
Season	Club	League	Apps	Goals	Apps	Goals	Apps	Goals	Apps	Goals
Japan			League		Emperor's Cup		J.League Cup		Total	
1987/88	All Nippon Airways	JSL Division 2	24	11			4	1	28	12
1988/89	All Nippon Airways	JSL Division 1	18	3			2	0	20	3
1989/90	All Nippon Airways	JSL Division 1	17	2			3	1	20	3
1990/91	All Nippon Airways	JSL Division 1	10	1			4	0	14	1
1991/92	All Nippon Airways	JSL Division 1	20	1			0	0	20	1
1992	Yokohama Flügels	J1 League	-		2	0	9	2	11	2
1993	Yokohama Flügels	J1 League	12	1	0	0	0	0	12	1
1994	Fujieda Blux	Football League	0	0	0	0	-		0	0
1995	Fukuoka Blux	Football League	0	0	0	0	-		0	0
Total			101	19	2	0	22	4	125	23
