= Angelo (footballer, born 1965) =

Brazilian footballer

Personal information
- Full name: Angelo Carlos Pretti
- Date of birth: 10 August 1965 (age 61)
- Place of birth: Brazil
- Height: 1.82 m (5 ft 11 1/2 in)
- Position: Striker

Senior career*
| Years | Team | Apps | (Gls) |
| 1993 | Yokohama Flügels | | |
| 1994 | Kyoto Purple Sanga | | |
| 1995–1997 | Montedio Yamagata | | |
| 1998 | Tokyo Gas | | |
- * Club domestic league appearances and goals

Angelo Carlos Pretti (born 10 August 1965) is a former Brazilian football player.

== Career statistics ==
Appearances and goals by club, season and competition
| Club | Season | League | | | Emperor's Cup | | J.League Cup | | Total | |
| Club | Season | Division | Apps | Goals | Apps | Goals | Apps | Goals | Apps | Goals |
|---|---|---|---|---|---|---|---|---|---|---|
| Yokohama Flügels | 1993 | J1 League | 13 | 3 | 0 | 0 | 0 | 0 | 13 | 3 |
| Kyoto Purple Sanga | 1994 | Football League | 25 | 17 | 2 | 2 | — | | 27 | 19 |
| NEC Yamagata | 1995 | Football League | 29 | 16 | 0 | 0 | — | | 29 | 16 |
| Montedio Yamagata | 1996 | Football League | 27 | 13 | 3 | 2 | — | | 30 | 15 |
| Montedio Yamagata | 1997 | Football League | 29 | 19 | 3 | 4 | — | | 32 | 23 |
| Tokyo Gas | 1998 | Football League | 26 | 8 | 3 | 0 | — | | 29 | 8 |
| Career total | | | 149 | 76 | 11 | 8 | 0 | 0 | 160 | 84 |
