= Masaaki Takada =

Japanese footballer

Masaaki Takada 高田 昌明
Personal information
- Full name: Masaaki Takada
- Date of birth: July 26, 1973 (age 53)
- Place of birth: Narashino, Chiba, Japan
- Height: 1.82 m (5 ft 11 1/2 in)
- Position: Defender

Youth career
- 1989–1991: Funabashi High School

Senior career*
Years	Team	Apps	(Gls)
1992–1996	Yokohama Flügels	77	(3)
1997	Vissel Kobe	0	(0)
1998	Tokyo Fulie		
1999–2001	Yokohama FC	65	(1)
2002–2005	Sony Sendai		
2006	Shizuoka FC		
Medal record
Yokohama Flügels
Winner	Emperor's Cup	1993
- * Club domestic league appearances and goals

Masaaki Takada (高田 昌明, Takada Masaaki; born July 26, 1973) is a former Japanese football player.

== Playing career ==
Takada was born in Narashino on July 26, 1973. After graduating from high school, he joined Yokohama Flügels in 1992. He became a regular player as defender and defensive midfielder from the first season. The club won the 1993 Emperor's Cup and 1994–95 Asian Cup Winners' Cup. However Takada's opportunity to play decreased from the 1995 season. In 1997, he was promoted to J1 League club, Vissel Kobe. However he hardly played in the matches. Through Tokyo Fulie in 1998, he joined a new club Yokohama FC which was founded by Yokohama Flügels supporters in 1999. He played many matches and the club was the Japan Football League (JFL) champion for 2 years in a row (1999-2000). The club was also promoted to the J2 League from 2001. In 2002, Takada moved to JFL club Sony Sendai and played until 2005. In 2006, he moved to Regional Leagues club Shizuoka FC and retired at the end of the 2006 season.

== Career statistics ==
Appearances and goals by club, season and competition
Club	Season	League			Emperor's Cup		J.League Cup		Total	
Club	Season	Division	Apps	Goals	Apps	Goals	Apps	Goals	Apps	Goals
Yokohama Flügels	1992	J1 League	-				9	0	9	0
Yokohama Flügels	1993	J1 League	33	2	5	1	4	0	42	3
Yokohama Flügels	1994	J1 League	26	0	0	0	1	0	27	0
Yokohama Flügels	1995	J1 League	17	1	0	0	-		17	1
Yokohama Flügels	1996	J1 League	1	0	0	0	0	0	1	0
Vissel Kobe	1997	J1 League	0	0	0	0	1	0	1	0
Yokohama FC	1999	Football League	23	0	0	0	-		23	0
Yokohama FC	2000	Football League	22	1	2	0	-		24	1
Yokohama FC	2001	J2 League	20	0	0	0	1	0	21	0
Sony Sendai	2002	Football League	16	1	1	0	-		17	1
Sony Sendai	2003	Football League	27	0	1	0	-		28	0
Sony Sendai	2004	Football League	21	4	3	0	-		24	4
Sony Sendai	2005	Football League								
Shizuoka FC	2006	Regional Leagues								
Career total			206	9	12	1	16	0	234	10
