= Masakiyo Maezono =

Japanese footballer (born 1973)

Masakiyo Maezono 前園 真聖
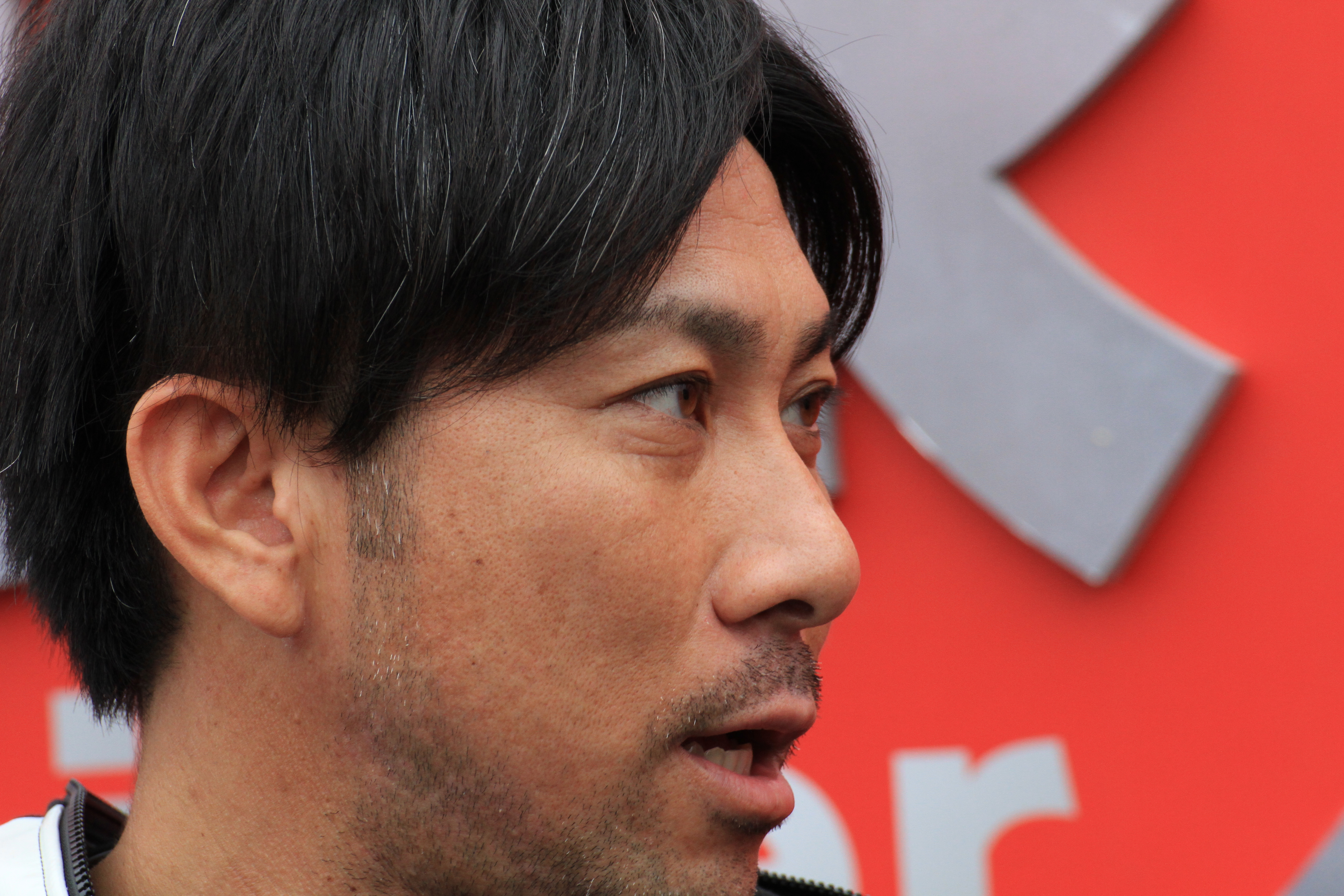

Personal information
- Full name: Masakiyo Maezono
- Date of birth: 29 October 1973 (age 53)
- Place of birth: Satsumasendai, Kagoshima, Japan
- Height: 1.70 m (5 ft 7 in)
- Positions: Forward; midfielder

Youth career
- 1989–1991: Kagoshima Jitsugyo High School

Senior career*
Years	Team	Apps	(Gls)
1992–1996	Yokohama Flügels	128	(25)
1997–2002	Tokyo Verdy	63	(9)
1998	→ Santos (loan)	5	(1)
1999	→ Goiás (loan)	0	(0)
2000	→ Shonan Bellmare (loan)	38	(11)
2003	Anyang LG Cheetahs	16	(0)
2004	Incheon United	4	(0)
Total		263	(47)

International career
1995–1996	Japan U-23	3	(2)
1994–1997	Japan	19	(4)
2009	Japan Beach Soccer		
Medal record
Yokohama Flügels
Winner	Emperor's Cup	1993
- * Club domestic league appearances and goals

Masakiyo Maezono (前園 真聖, Maezono Masakiyo; born 29 October 1973) is a former Japanese football player. He played for the Japan national team.

== Club career ==
Maezono was born in Satsumasendai on 29 October 1973. After graduating from high school, he joined Yokohama Flügels in 1992. He debuted in June 1993 and he became a regular player after his debut. The club won the 1993 Emperor's Cup, their first major title. In Asia, the club also won the 1994–95 Asian Cup Winners' Cup, their first Asian title. In 1997, he moved to Verdy Kawasaki (later Tokyo Verdy). In October 1998, he moved to Brazil and played for Santos (1998) and Goiás (1999). In 2000, he returned to Japan and joined J2 League club Shonan Bellmare. In 2001, he returned to Tokyo Verdy. In 2003, he moved to South Korea and played for Anyang LG Cheetahs (2003) and Incheon United (2004). He announced his retirement in May 2005.

== International career ==
On 22 May 1994, Maezono debuted for the Japan national team against Australia. He also played at the 1994 Asian Games.

From 1995, Maezono prioritized the Japan U-23 national team. He played as captain for U-23 Japan. In the 1996 Summer Olympics Qualifiers Japan qualified for the 1996 Summer Olympics for the first time in 28 years since the 1968 Summer Olympics where Japan won the bronze medal. At the 1996 Olympics, although Japan won 2 matches, they exited in the first round. At the Olympics Japan beat Brazil in the first game. It was known as the "Miracle of Miami" (マイアミの奇跡) in Japan. He played 3 games at the Olympics and scored 2 goals against Hungary.

After the 1996 Summer Olympics, in August 1996, Maezono was selected by the Japan senior team for the first time in years. On 25 August, he played and scored a goal against Uruguay. This goal was his first goal for Japan. In December, he played at the 1996 Asian Cup. He played 19 games and scored 4 goals for Japan until 1997.

== Beach Soccer career ==
After retirement, Maezono was selected by the Japan national beach soccer team by manager Ruy Ramos who was his teammate at Verdy Kawasaki. Japan won the championship at the 2009 AFC Beach Soccer Championship and participated in the 2009 Beach Soccer World Cup.

== Club statistics ==
Club performance			League		Cup		League Cup		Total	
Season	Club	League	Apps	Goals	Apps	Goals	Apps	Goals	Apps	Goals
Japan			League		Emperor's Cup		J.League Cup		Total	
1992	Yokohama Flügels	J1 League	-				0	0	0	0
1993	Yokohama Flügels	J1 League	24	2	5	1	5	0	34	3
1994	Yokohama Flügels	J1 League	38	8	2	0	2	0	42	8
1995	Yokohama Flügels	J1 League	40	7	2	0	-		42	7
1996	Yokohama Flügels	J1 League	26	8	2	0	11	7	39	15
1997	Verdy Kawasaki	J1 League	28	5	2	0	0	0	30	5
1998	Verdy Kawasaki	J1 League	22	3	0	0	2	1	24	4
Brazil			League		Copa do Brasil		League Cup		Total	
1998	Santos	Série A	5	1					5	1
1999	Goiás	Série B	0	0					0	0
Japan			League		Emperor's Cup		J.League Cup		Total	
2000	Shonan Bellmare	J2 League	38	11	3	2	2	0	43	13
2001	Tokyo Verdy	J1 League	13	1	0	0	2	0	15	1
2002	Tokyo Verdy	J1 League	0	0	0	0	0	0	0	0
Korea Republic			League		FA Cup		League Cup		Total	
2003	Anyang LG Cheetahs	K League	16	0	0	0	0	0	16	0
2004	Incheon United	K League	4	0	0	0	9	1	13	1
Country	Japan		229	45	16	3	24	8	269	56
Country	Brazil		5	1					5	1
Country	Korea Republic		20	0	0	0	9	1	29	1
Total			254	46	16	3	33	9	303	58

== National team statistics ==
Japan national team
Year	Apps	Goals
1994	6	0
1995	4	0
1996	7	4
1997	2	0
Total	19	4

=== National team goals ===
Results list Japan's goal tally first.

Date	Venue	Opponent	Score	Result	Competition
25 August 1996	Osaka, Japan	Uruguay	1 goal	5–3	Friendly match
13 October 1996	Kobe, Japan	Tunisia	1 goal	1–0	Friendly match
9 December 1996	Al Ain, UAE	Uzbekistan	2 goals	4–0	1996 AFC Asian Cup

== Honors and awards ==
Individual

- J.League Best XI : 1996

Japan beach soccer national team

- AFC Beach Soccer Championship : 2009

== National team ==
- 1996 Summer Olympics
- 1996 Asian Cup
