= Fernando Moner =

Argentine footballer

Personal information
- Full name: Fernando Daniel Moner
- Date of birth: 30 December 1967 (age 58)
- Place of birth: Mercedes, Argentina
- Height: 1.85 m (6 ft 1 in)
- Position: Defender

Senior career*
Years	Team	Apps	(Gls)
1986–1988	San Lorenzo	?	(?)
1988–1991	All Nippon Airways	63	(3)
1991–1992	Atlético Madrid	?	(?)
1993–1994	Yokohama Flügels	60	(3)
1995–1996	Atlético Tucumán	?	(?)
1996–1998	Platense	47	(1)
1998–1999	Unión de Santa Fe	34	(2)
1999–2002	Huracán	?	(?)
2002–2003	Yokohama FC	11	(0)
Total		427	(12)
- * Club domestic league appearances and goals

Fernando Daniel Moner (born 30 December 1967) is a retired Argentine football player.

== Club statistics ==
Club performance			League		Cup		League Cup		Total	
Season	Club	League	Apps	Goals	Apps	Goals	Apps	Goals	Apps	Goals
Japan			League		Emperor's Cup		J.League Cup		Total	
1988/89	All Nippon Airways	JSL Division 1	22	0					22	0
1989/90	All Nippon Airways	JSL Division 1	21	2			2	0	23	2
1990/91	All Nippon Airways	JSL Division 1	20	1			4	1	24	2
1993	Yokohama Flügels	J1 League	29	3	4	2	5	1	38	6
1994	Yokohama Flügels	J1 League	31	0	2	0	2	0	35	0
2002	Yokohama FC	J2 League	11	0	1	0	-		12	0
2003	Yokohama FC	J2 League	0	0	0	0	-		0	0
Total			134	6	7	2	13	2	154	10
