= 1993 Emperor's Cup =

Tournament details
- Country: Japan

Final positions
- Champions: Yokohama Flügels (1st title)
- Runners-up: Kashima Antlers
- Semifinalists: Shimizu S-Pulse; Sanfrecce Hiroshima

Statistics of Emperor's Cup in the 1993 season.

== Overview ==
It was contested by 32 teams, and Yokohama Flügels won the championship.

== Results ==
=== First round ===
- Kashima Antlers 1–1 (PK 3–2) NKK
- Tohoku Electric Power 3–2 Sanyo Sumoto S.C.
- Nagoya Grampus Eight 2–1 Yamaha Motors
- Kochi University 0–5 Gamba Osaka
- JEF United Ichihara 3–0 Osaka University of Commerce
- Toshiba 2–1 Fukuoka University
- Seino Transportation SC 1–2 Chuo University
- Sapporo University 0–6 Shimizu S-Pulse
- Yokohama Marinos 3–1 Hitachi
- Doshisha University 2–4 Kawasaki Steel
- Waseda University 3–0 Hokuriku Electric Power
- National Institute of Fitness and Sports in Kanoya 1–2 Sanfrecce Hiroshima
- Yokohama Flügels 4–1 Tanabe Pharmaceuticals
- Otsuka Pharmaceutical 0–3 Urawa Red Diamonds
- Cosmo Oil Yokkaichi 1–0 Fujita Industries
- Hokkaido Electric Power 0–5 Verdy Kawasaki

=== Second round ===
- Kashima Antlers 6–1 Tohoku Electric Power
- Nagoya Grampus Eight 3–2 Gamba Osaka
- JEF United Ichihara 2–0 Toshiba
- Chuo University 0–1 Shimizu S-Pulse
- Yokohama Marinos 2–1 Kawasaki Steel
- Waseda University 0–2 Sanfrecce Hiroshima
- Yokohama Flügels 4–3 Urawa Red Diamonds
- Cosmo Oil Yokkaichi 0–2 Verdy Kawasaki

=== Quarter-finals ===
- Kashima Antlers 5–3 Nagoya Grampus Eight
- JEF United Ichihara 1–2 Shimizu S-Pulse
- Yokohama Marinos 1–3 Sanfrecce Hiroshima
- Yokohama Flügels 2–1 Verdy Kawasaki

=== Semi-finals ===
- Kashima Antlers 1–0 Shimizu S-Pulse
- Sanfrecce Hiroshima 1–2 Yokohama Flügels

=== Final ===
- Kashima Antlers 2–6 Yokohama Flügels

Yokohama Flügels won the championship.
