= Yokohama Flügels =

Yokohama Flügels 横浜フリューゲルス
- Full name: Yokohama Flügels
- Nickname: Fulie
- Founded: 1964; 62 years ago as All Nippon Airways S.C.
- Dissolved: 1999; 27 years ago
- Stadium: Mitsuzawa Stadium, Yokohama
- Capacity: 15,046
| Home colours | Away colours |

The Yokohama Flügels (横浜フリューゲルス, Yokohama Furyūgerusu), also known as the AS Flügels, was a Japanese football club that played in the J.League between 1993 and 1998. The club was an original member ("Original Ten" (Note: The original clubs of the J.League in 1993 were Kashima Antlers, Urawa Red Diamonds, JEF United Ichihara, Verdy Kawasaki, Yokohama Marinos, Flügels, Shimizu S-Pulse, Nagoya Grampus Eight, Gamba Osaka and Sanfrecce Hiroshima.)) of the J.League in 1993. In 1999, the club merged with local rivals Yokohama Marinos to become Yokohama F. Marinos. However, many Flügels fans refused to support the new combined effort and created their own club, Yokohama FC.

== History ==
The club was originally the company team of All Nippon Airways. For a time they were billed as Yokohama TriStar SC, but the aftermath of the Lockheed-ANA bribery scandal ensured that ANA stuck to their own name as they were pushing for promotion to the Japan Soccer League from the regional Kanto Football League in the early 1980s. They were promoted to the JSL's Second Division in 1984 and immediately made an impact, being promoted to First Division as runner-up. Despite being relegated at the first attempt in 1985, they bounced back up again in 1987 and would never leave the top flight until their demise.

The club's name, adopted upon professionalization for the J.League, sprang from the German word Flügel, meaning wing or wings ("Flügels" is an anglicised plural, where the original German word has only one form differentiated by the article (der Flügel for the singular form, die Flügel for the plural). The name points to the club's former sponsor. For a time it was billed as AS Flügels, with the initials of both sponsors, ANA and Sato Labs, forming an initialism that resembled the Italian and French initials for "Sporting Association" (Associazione Sportiva and Association Sportive).

Despite never winning either the JSL or J.League title, they were top contenders from the late 1980s through its last game, and won several accolades at home and abroad, including the Emperor's Cup, the Asian Cup Winners' Cup and the Asian Super Cup, armed with the talent of Brazilian stars César Sampaio and Zinho on the midfield and Evair on the offense.

In 1998, Sato Labs announced that it was pulling its financial support of the club. However, instead of simply dissolving the club or finding another investor, ANA, the team's other chief sponsor, met with Nissan Motors, the primary sponsor of crosstown rivals Yokohama Marinos, and announced that the two Yokohama clubs would merge, with Flügels players joining the Marinos.

Although the "F" added to the new club name, "Yokohama F. Marinos" is meant to represent the merger of the two clubs, Flügels supporters rejected the merger. Instead, the supporter club followed the socio model used by Barcelona and founded Yokohama FC, the first professional Japanese football club owned and operated by its members.

On 1 January 1999, Flügels won their final match, the 1998 Emperor's Cup Final against Shimizu S-Pulse, 2–1. Due to their merger, however, Shimizu took their place in the 1999 Japanese Super Cup and the subsequent Asian Cup Winners' Cup, with S-Pulse winning the latter against Iraqi club Al-Zawraa 1–0.

Flügels were the second club to withdraw from the Japanese top flight and fold and the first since 1976, when Eidai Industries from Yamaguchi Prefecture was closed down by its parent company due to rising costs of maintaining a top-flight team.

== Record as J.League member ==
| Season | Div. | Teams | Pos. | Attendance/G | J.League Cup | Emperor's Cup | Asia | |
|---|---|---|---|---|---|---|---|---|
| 1992 | – | | | | Group stage | Second round | – | |
| 1993 | J1 | 10 | 6 | 15,464 | Semi-finals | Winners | – | |
| 1994 | J1 | 12 | 7 | 19,438 | Second round | Second round | – | |
| 1995 | J1 | 14 | 13 | 15,802 | – | Second round | CWC | Semi-finals |
| 1996 | J1 | 16 | 3 | 13,877 | Group stage | Fourth round | – | |
| 1997 | J1 | 17 | 6 | 10,084 | Semi-finals | Runners-up | – | |
| 1998 | J1 | 18 | 7 | 15,895 | Group stage | Winners | – | |

Key

- Pos. = Position in league
- Attendance/G = Average league attendancë

=== Kit evolution ===
FP 1st
| 1992 | 1993 - 1994 | 1995 - 1996 | 1997 - 1998 |

FP 2nd
| 1992 | 1993 - 1994 | 1995 - 1996 | 1997 - 1998 |

== Honours ==
Yokohama Flügels honours
| Honour | No. | Years |
|---|---|---|
| JSL Division 2 | 1 | 1987/88 |
| Regional Promotion Series | 1 | 1983 |
| Emperor's Cup | 2 | 1993, 1998 |
| Asian Cup Winners' Cup | 1 | 1994/95 |
| Asian Super Cup | 1 | 1995 |

== Mascot ==
Yokohama Flugels' mascot was a flying squirrel named Tobimaru. He currently is displayed in the Japan Football Museum after the Flugels were dissolved. He wore the team's kit, and had wings that were cyan and white. He also wore an aviator helmet.

== Anthem ==
The Flugels' anthem was a remix and relyricing of the song Victory by Japanese rock band The Alfee.

== See also ==
- Yokohama FC
- Yokohama F. Marinos
