= 2002 Emperor's Cup final =

2002 Emperor's Cup Final
Kyoto Purple Sanga	Kashima Antlers
2	1
- Date: January 1, 2003
- Venue: National Stadium, Tokyo

The 2002 Emperor's Cup Final was the 82nd final of the Emperor's Cup competition. The final was played at National Stadium in Tokyo on January 1, 2003. Kyoto Purple Sanga won the match.

== Overview ==
Kyoto Purple Sanga won their first title, by defeating Kashima Antlers 2–1 with Park Ji-sung and Teruaki Kurobe scoring.

== Match details ==
January 1, 2003

Kyoto Purple Sanga	2–1	Kashima Antlers
Park Ji-sung 50'; Teruaki Kurobe 80'		Euller 15'

National Stadium

Kyoto Purple Sanga
GK	1	(Japan) Naohito Hirai
DF	4	(Japan) Kazuhiro Suzuki
DF	5	(Japan) Kazuki Teshima
DF	27	(Japan) Makoto Kakuda
MF	17	(Japan) Shinya Tomita
MF	22	(Japan) Daisuke Saito
MF	11	(Japan) Kiyotaka Ishimaru
MF	14	(Japan) Shingo Suzuki
FW	7	(South Korea) Park Ji-sung	(substituted off) 87'
FW	9	(Japan) Teruaki Kurobe
FW	10	(Japan) Daisuke Matsui
Substitutes:
GK	21	(Japan) Hideaki Ueno
DF	16	(Japan) Shigeki Tsujimoto
MF	3	(Japan) Tadashi Nakamura
MF	8	(Japan) Makoto Atsuta	(substituted on) 87'
FW	31	(Japan) Yutaka Tahara
Manager:
(Germany) Engels

Kashima Antlers
GK	21	(Japan) Hitoshi Sogahata
DF	2	(Japan) Akira Narahashi
DF	3	(Japan) Yutaka Akita
DF	4	(Brazil) Fabiano
DF	17	(Japan) Jun Uchida	(substituted off) 75'
MF	6	(Japan) Yasuto Honda	(substituted off) 83'
MF	5	(Japan) Kōji Nakata
MF	8	(Japan) Mitsuo Ogasawara
MF	16	(Brazil) Augusto
FW	13	(Japan) Atsushi Yanagisawa
FW	31	(Brazil) Euller
Substitutes:
GK	29	(Japan) Riki Takasaki	(substituted on) 87'
DF	20	(Japan) Tomohiko Ikeuchi
MF	24	(Japan) Takeshi Aoki	(substituted on) 75' (substituted off) 87'
MF	25	(Japan) Takuya Nozawa
FW	11	(Japan) Yoshiyuki Hasegawa	(substituted on) 83'
Manager:
(Brazil) Toninho Cerezo

== See also ==
- 2002 Emperor's Cup
