= 2002 Kyoto Purple Sanga season =

Kyoto Purple Sanga
2002 season
- Manager: Gert Engels
- Stadium: Nishikyogoku Athletic Stadium
- J. League 1: 5th
- Emperor's Cup: Champions
- J. League Cup: GL-C 4th
- Top goalscorer: Teruaki Kurobe (13)
Home colours	Away colours

2002 Kyoto Purple Sanga season

== Competitions ==
Competitions	Position
J. League 1	5th / 16 clubs
Emperor's Cup	Champions
J. League Cup	GL-C 4th / 4 clubs

== Domestic results ==
=== J. League 1 ===
Match	Date	Venue	Opponents	Score
1-1	2002.3.3	Ichihara Seaside Stadium	JEF United Ichihara	1-2
1-2	2002.3.10	Nishikyogoku Athletic Stadium	Gamba Osaka	0-2
1-3	2002.3.16	Hiroshima Big Arch	Sanfrecce Hiroshima	1-2
1-4	2002.3.31	Yamaha Stadium	Júbilo Iwata	1-3
1-5	2002.4.6	Nishikyogoku Athletic Stadium	Tokyo Verdy 1969	5-1
1-6	2002.4.13	Muroran (ja:室蘭市入江運動公園陸上競技場)	Consadole Sapporo	2-1 a.e.t. (sudden death)
1-7	2002.4.20	Mizuho Athletic Stadium	Nagoya Grampus Eight	1-0
1-8	2002.7.13	Nishikyogoku Athletic Stadium	Kashiwa Reysol	2-0
1-9	2002.7.20	Kobe Universiade Memorial Stadium	Vissel Kobe	2-1 a.e.t. (sudden death)
1-10	2002.7.24	Nishikyogoku Athletic Stadium	Kashima Antlers	2-1 a.e.t. (sudden death)
1-11	2002.7.27	Urawa Komaba Stadium	Urawa Red Diamonds	3-1
1-12	2002.8.4	Nishikyogoku Athletic Stadium	Yokohama F. Marinos	1-1 a.e.t.
1-13	2002.8.7	Tokyo Stadium	F.C. Tokyo	3-1
1-14	2002.8.10	Nishikyogoku Athletic Stadium	Shimizu S-Pulse	0-1
1-15	2002.8.17	Tottori Soccer Stadium	Vegalta Sendai	2-1 a.e.t. (sudden death)
2-1	2002.8.31	Tokyo Stadium	Tokyo Verdy 1969	0-5
2-2	2002.9.7	Nishikyogoku Athletic Stadium	Consadole Sapporo	1-0
2-3	2002.9.14	Hitachi Kashiwa Soccer Stadium	Kashiwa Reysol	1-0
2-4	2002.9.18	Kashima Soccer Stadium	Kashima Antlers	1-2
2-5	2002.9.21	Nishikyogoku Athletic Stadium	Vissel Kobe	2-1 a.e.t. (sudden death)
2-6	2002.9.29	Kagoshima Kamoike Stadium	Sanfrecce Hiroshima	2-0
2-7	2002.10.6	Mitsuzawa Stadium	Yokohama F. Marinos	1-0
2-8	2002.10.12	Nishikyogoku Athletic Stadium	Urawa Red Diamonds	1-4
2-9	2002.10.19	Shizuoka Stadium	Shimizu S-Pulse	1-2
2-10	2002.10.23	Nishikyogoku Athletic Stadium	F.C. Tokyo	0-1
2-11	2002.10.26	Nishikyogoku Athletic Stadium	Nagoya Grampus Eight	2-1 a.e.t. (sudden death)
2-12	2002.11.10	Sendai Stadium	Vegalta Sendai	2-1
2-13	2002.11.16	Nishikyogoku Athletic Stadium	Júbilo Iwata	0-3
2-14	2002.11.23	Osaka Expo '70 Stadium	Gamba Osaka	1-2 a.e.t. (sudden death)
2-15	2002.11.30	Nishikyogoku Athletic Stadium	JEF United Ichihara	3-2

=== Emperor's Cup ===
15 December 2002 Third round	Kyoto Purple Sanga	4–0	Yokohama FC	Kyoto
	Kurobe 5', 28', 49'; Matsui 26'	Report		Stadium: Nishikyogoku Athletic Stadium; Attendance: 2,643

22 December 2002 Fourth round	Avispa Fukuoka	0–1 (a.e.t.)	Kyoto Purple Sanga	Fukuoka
		Report	Tahara 95'	Stadium: Hakatanomori Football Stadium; Attendance: 2,405

25 December 2002 Quarterfinals	Nagoya Grampus Eight	0–1	Kyoto Purple Sanga	Nagoya
		Report	Matsui 35'	Stadium: Mizuho Athletics Stadium; Attendance: 3,315

29 December 2002 Semifinals	Kyoto Purple Sanga	2–1	Sanfrecce Hiroshima	Kyoto
	Matsui 13', 21'	Report	Morisaki 72'	Stadium: Nishikyogoku Athletic Stadium; Attendance: 8,909

1 January 2003 Final	Kashima Antlers	1–2	Kyoto Purple Sanga	Tokyo
	Euller 15'	Report	Park Ji-sung 50'; Kurobe 80'	Stadium: National Stadium; Attendance: 50,526

=== J. League Cup ===
Match	Date	Venue	Opponents	Score
GL-C-1	2002..			-
GL-C-2	2002..			-
GL-C-3	2002..			-
GL-C-4	2002..			-
GL-C-5	2002..			-
GL-C-6	2002..			-

== International results ==
26 May 2002 International friendly	Kyoto Purple Sanga	1–1	Ecuador
	Tomita	Report	Aguinaga

== Player statistics ==
No.	Pos.	Player	D.o.B. (Age)	Height / Weight	J. League 1		Emperor's Cup		J. League Cup		Total	
No.	Pos.	Player	D.o.B. (Age)	Height / Weight	Apps	Goals	Apps	Goals	Apps	Goals	Apps	Goals
1	GK	Naohito Hirai	July 16, 1978 (aged 23)	cm / kg	26	0						
2	DF	Hiroshi Noguchi	February 25, 1972 (aged 30)	cm / kg	1	0						
3	DF	Tadashi Nakamura	June 10, 1971 (aged 30)	cm / kg	24	0						
4	DF	Kazuhiro Suzuki	November 16, 1976 (aged 25)	cm / kg	28	0						
5	DF	Kazuki Teshima	June 7, 1979 (aged 22)	cm / kg	20	0						
6	DF	Jin Sato	September 27, 1974 (aged 27)	cm / kg	4	0						
7	MF	Park Ji-Sung	February 25, 1981 (aged 21)	cm / kg	25	7						
8	MF	Makoto Atsuta	September 16, 1976 (aged 25)	cm / kg	18	0						
9	FW	Teruaki Kurobe	March 6, 1978 (aged 23)	cm / kg	27	13						
10	MF	Daisuke Matsui	May 11, 1981 (aged 20)	cm / kg	23	4						
11	MF	Kiyotaka Ishimaru	October 30, 1973 (aged 28)	cm / kg	26	0						
12	GK	Masahiko Nakagawa	August 26, 1969 (aged 32)	cm / kg	1	0						
13	MF	Atsushi Mio	January 26, 1983 (aged 19)	cm / kg	0	0						
14	MF	Shingo Suzuki	March 20, 1978 (aged 23)	cm / kg	30	7						
15	MF	Tomoaki Matsukawa	April 18, 1973 (aged 28)	cm / kg	3	0						
15	DF	Yusuke Mori	July 24, 1980 (aged 21)	cm / kg	1	0						
16	DF	Shigeki Tsujimoto	June 23, 1979 (aged 22)	cm / kg	13	1						
17	MF	Shinya Tomita	May 8, 1980 (aged 21)	cm / kg	20	3						
18	FW	Yusaku Ueno	November 1, 1973 (aged 28)	cm / kg	23	2						
19	MF	Hiroshi Otsuki	April 23, 1980 (aged 21)	cm / kg	2	0						
20	FW	An Hyo-Yeon	April 16, 1978 (aged 23)	cm / kg	7	1						
21	GK	Hideaki Ueno	May 31, 1981 (aged 20)	cm / kg	4	0						
22	MF	Daisuke Saito	August 29, 1980 (aged 21)	cm / kg	22	1						
23	DF	Takatoshi Matsumoto	September 5, 1983 (aged 18)	cm / kg	4	0						
24	FW	Noboru Kohara	July 22, 1983 (aged 18)	cm / kg	1	0						
25	FW	Shinichi Fukuju	July 3, 1983 (aged 18)	cm / kg	0	0						
26	MF	Daisuke Nakaharai	May 22, 1977 (aged 24)	cm / kg	27	3						
27	DF	Makoto Kakuda	July 10, 1983 (aged 18)	cm / kg	22	0						
28	GK	Hiromasa Takashima	April 17, 1980 (aged 21)	cm / kg	0	0						
29	FW	Richal	August 15, 1982 (aged 19)	cm / kg	0	0						
30	DF	Daniel Sanabria	February 8, 1977 (aged 25)	cm / kg	0	0						
31	DF	Ned Zelic	July 4, 1971 (aged 30)	cm / kg	1	0						
31	FW	Yutaka Tahara	April 27, 1982 (aged 19)	cm / kg	5	1						

== Other pages ==
- (in Japanese) J. League official site
