= 2003 Kyoto Purple Sanga season =

Kyoto Purple Sanga
2003 season
- Manager: Gert Engels; Bunji Kimura; Pim Verbeek; Bunji Kimura
- Stadium: Nishikyogoku Athletic Stadium
- J.League 1: 16th
- Emperor's Cup: 3rd Round
- J.League Cup: GL-D 2nd
- Top goalscorer: Teruaki Kurobe (10)
Home colours	Away colours

The 2003 season of the Kyoto Purple Sanga Japanese football club was the team's eighth season in the J.League.

== Competitions ==
Competitions	Position
J.League 1	16th / 16 clubs
Emperor's Cup	3rd round
J.League Cup	GL-D 2nd / 3 clubs

== Domestic results ==
=== J.League 1 ===
Match	Date	Venue	Opponents	Score
1-1	March 23, 2003	Nishikyogoku Athletic Stadium	Gamba Osaka	1-2
1-2	April 6, 2003	Kobe Wing Stadium	Vissel Kobe	2-0
1-3	April 12, 2003	Kagoshima Kamoike Stadium	Kashiwa Reysol	0-1
1-4	April 19, 2003	Urawa Komaba Stadium	Urawa Red Diamonds	0-2
1-5	April 26, 2003	Nishikyogoku Athletic Stadium	Shimizu S-Pulse	0-3
1-6	April 29, 2003	Ichihara Seaside Stadium	JEF United Ichihara	1-5
1-7	May 5, 2003	Nishikyogoku Athletic Stadium	Vegalta Sendai	1-0
1-8	May 11, 2003	Yamaha Stadium	Júbilo Iwata	0-5
1-9	May 17, 2003	Kagoshima Kamoike Stadium	Tokyo Verdy 1969	2-5
1-10	May 24, 2003	Nishikyogoku Athletic Stadium	Cerezo Osaka	2-4
1-11	July 5, 2003	Toyota Stadium	Nagoya Grampus Eight	1-1
1-12	July 12, 2003	International Stadium Yokohama	Yokohama F. Marinos	1-2
1-13	July 19, 2003	Nishikyogoku Athletic Stadium	Oita Trinita	0-2
1-14	July 27, 2003	National Olympic Stadium (Tokyo)	FC Tokyo	0-1
1-15	August 2, 2003	Nishikyogoku Athletic Stadium	Kashima Antlers	3-1
2-1	August 16, 2003	Hitachi Kashiwa Soccer Stadium	Kashiwa Reysol	1-2
2-2	August 23, 2003	Nishikyogoku Athletic Stadium	Urawa Red Diamonds	0-0
2-3	August 30, 2003	Nishikyogoku Athletic Stadium	Júbilo Iwata	1-0
2-4	September 6, 2003	Ajinomoto Stadium	Tokyo Verdy 1969	1-4
2-5	September 13, 2003	Nagai Stadium	Cerezo Osaka	3-2
2-6	September 20, 2003	Nishikyogoku Athletic Stadium	Nagoya Grampus Eight	1-2
2-7	September 23, 2003	Kashima Soccer Stadium	Kashima Antlers	1-1
2-8	September 27, 2003	Nishikyogoku Athletic Stadium	FC Tokyo	1-1
2-9	October 5, 2003	Nihondaira Sports Stadium	Shimizu S-Pulse	0-1
2-10	October 18, 2003	Nishikyogoku Athletic Stadium	Yokohama F. Marinos	0-0
2-11	October 25, 2003	KKWing Stadium	Oita Trinita	0-1
2-12	November 8, 2003	Nishikyogoku Athletic Stadium	JEF United Ichihara	3-2
2-13	November 16, 2003	Sendai Stadium	Vegalta Sendai	1-3
2-14	November 22, 2003	Nishikyogoku Athletic Stadium	Vissel Kobe	0-2
2-15	November 29, 2003	Osaka Expo '70 Stadium	Gamba Osaka	1-5

=== Emperor's Cup ===
Match	Date	Venue	Opponents	Score
3rd round	2003			-

=== J.League Cup ===
Match	Date	Venue	Opponents	Score
GL-D-1	2003			-
GL-D-2	2003			-
GL-D-3	2003			-
GL-D-4	2003			-

== Player statistics ==
No.	Pos.	Player	Age	Height / Weight	J.League 1		Emperor's Cup		J.League Cup		Total	
No.	Pos.	Player	Age	Height / Weight	Apps	Goals	Apps	Goals	Apps	Goals	Apps	Goals
1	GK	Naohito Hirai	July 16, 1978 (aged 24)	cm / kg	28	0						
2	DF	Shigeki Tsujimoto	June 23, 1979 (aged 23)	cm / kg	8	0						
3	DF	Tadashi Nakamura	June 10, 1971 (aged 31)	cm / kg	17	0						
4	DF	Kazuhiro Suzuki	November 16, 1976 (aged 26)	cm / kg	16	1						
5	DF	Kazuki Teshima	June 7, 1979 (aged 23)	cm / kg	23	0						
6	MF	Kiyotaka Ishimaru	October 30, 1973 (aged 29)	cm / kg	27	0						
7	MF	Shingo Suzuki	March 20, 1978 (aged 24)	cm / kg	30	1						
8	MF	Makoto Atsuta	September 16, 1976 (aged 26)	cm / kg	4	0						
8	DF	Masahiro Ando	April 2, 1972 (aged 30)	cm / kg	3	0						
9	FW	Teruaki Kurobe	March 6, 1978 (aged 25)	cm / kg	23	10						
10	MF	Daisuke Matsui	May 11, 1981 (aged 21)	cm / kg	27	2						
11	FW	Yutaka Tahara	April 27, 1982 (aged 20)	cm / kg	10	1						
13	MF	Atsushi Mio	January 26, 1983 (aged 20)	cm / kg	2	0						
14	MF	Daisuke Nakaharai	May 22, 1977 (aged 25)	cm / kg	27	3						
15	FW	Tadamichi Machida	May 23, 1981 (aged 21)	cm / kg	14	4						
16	MF	Daisuke Saito	August 29, 1980 (aged 22)	cm / kg	27	1						
17	MF	Shinya Tomita	May 8, 1980 (aged 22)	cm / kg	22	1						
18	DF	Takatoshi Matsumoto	September 5, 1983 (aged 19)	cm / kg	1	0						
19	MF	Hiroshi Otsuki	April 23, 1980 (aged 22)	cm / kg	0	0						
20	FW	Noboru Kohara	July 22, 1983 (aged 19)	cm / kg	0	0						
21	GK	Hideaki Ueno	May 31, 1981 (aged 21)	cm / kg	2	0						
22	FW	Shinichi Fukuju	July 3, 1983 (aged 19)	cm / kg	0	0						
23	MF	Masayuki Maegawa	June 20, 1984 (aged 18)	cm / kg	0	0						
24	MF	Daigo Watanabe	December 3, 1984 (aged 18)	cm / kg	0	0						
25	MF	Takuya Muguruma	June 13, 1984 (aged 18)	cm / kg	0	0						
26	GK	Koji Nishimura	July 7, 1984 (aged 18)	cm / kg	0	0						
27	DF	Makoto Kakuda	July 10, 1983 (aged 19)	cm / kg	25	0						
28	GK	Hiromasa Takashima	April 17, 1980 (aged 22)	cm / kg	0	0						
29	DF	Yusuke Mori	July 24, 1980 (aged 22)	cm / kg	11	0						
30	MF	Ko Jong-Soo	October 30, 1978 (aged 24)	cm / kg	13	1						
30	FW	Reggie	June 28, 1973 (aged 29)	cm / kg	7	2						
31	MF	Harutaka Ono	May 12, 1978 (aged 24)	cm / kg	12	0						
32	DF	Lim You-Hwan	December 2, 1983 (aged 19)	cm / kg	13	0						
33	FW	Marquinhos	February 24, 1976 (aged 27)	cm / kg	0	0						
33	MF	Biju	September 17, 1974 (aged 28)	cm / kg	13	1						

== Other pages ==
- (in Japanese) J. League official site
