= 2001 Kyoto Purple Sanga season =

Kyoto Purple Sanga
2001 season
- Manager: Gert Engels
- Stadium: Nishikyogoku Athletic Stadium
- J.League 2: 1st
- Emperor's Cup: 4th Round
- J.League Cup: 1st Round
- Top goalscorer: Teruaki Kurobe (30)
Home colours	Away colours

2001 Kyoto Purple Sanga season

== Competitions ==
Competitions	Position
J.League 2	1st / 12 clubs
Emperor's Cup	4th round
J.League Cup	1st round

== Domestic results ==
=== J.League 2 ===
10 March 2001 1	Kyoto Purple Sanga	2-2 (GG) (a.e.t.)	Montedio Yamagata	Nishikyogoku Athletic Stadium
JST (UTC+09)

17 March 2001 2	Kyoto Purple Sanga	1-0	Albirex Niigata	Nishikyogoku Athletic Stadium
JST (UTC+09)

24 March 2001 3	Kawasaki Frontale	2-4	Kyoto Purple Sanga	Todoroki Athletics Stadium
JST (UTC+09)

31 March 2001 4	Kyoto Purple Sanga	2-1	Shonan Bellmare	Nishikyogoku Athletic Stadium
JST (UTC+09)

8 April 2001 5	Vegalta Sendai	3-2	Kyoto Purple Sanga	Sendai Stadium
JST (UTC+09)

13 April 2001 6	Kyoto Purple Sanga	2-1	Oita Trinita	Nishikyogoku Athletic Stadium
JST (UTC+09)

21 April 2001 7	Omiya Ardija	0-2	Kyoto Purple Sanga	Omiya Football Stadium
JST (UTC+09)

28 April 2001 8	Kyoto Purple Sanga	1-1 (GG) (a.e.t.)	Mito HollyHock	Nishikyogoku Athletic Stadium
JST (UTC+09)

3 May 2001 9	Yokohama FC	3-1	Kyoto Purple Sanga	Yokohama Mitsuzawa Stadium
JST (UTC+09)

6 May 2001 10	Kyoto Purple Sanga	4-0	Ventforet Kofu	Nishikyogoku Athletic Stadium
JST (UTC+09)

13 May 2001 11	Sagan Tosu	1-3	Kyoto Purple Sanga	Tosu Stadium
JST (UTC+09)

19 May 2001 12	Albirex Niigata	3-4 (GG) (a.e.t.)	Kyoto Purple Sanga	Niigata Stadium
JST (UTC+09)

23 May 2001 13	Kyoto Purple Sanga	4-0	Kawasaki Frontale	Nishikyogoku Athletic Stadium
JST (UTC+09)

26 May 2001 14	Oita Trinita	3-1	Kyoto Purple Sanga	Ōita Stadium
JST (UTC+09)

16 June 2001 15	Kyoto Purple Sanga	1-3	Omiya Ardija	Tottori Soccer Stadium
JST (UTC+09)

23 June 2001 16	Ventforet Kofu	1-3	Kyoto Purple Sanga	Kose Sports Park Stadium
JST (UTC+09)

29 June 2001 17	Kyoto Purple Sanga	2-1 (GG) (a.e.t.)	Sagan Tosu	Nishikyogoku Athletic Stadium
JST (UTC+09)

7 July 2001 18	Mito HollyHock	0-3	Kyoto Purple Sanga	Hitachinaka City Stadium
JST (UTC+09)

11 July 2001 19	Kyoto Purple Sanga	2-1	Yokohama FC	Nishikyogoku Athletic Stadium
JST (UTC+09)

14 July 2001 20	Montedio Yamagata	2-1	Kyoto Purple Sanga	Yamagata Park Stadium
JST (UTC+09)

21 July 2001 21	Shonan Bellmare	0-2	Kyoto Purple Sanga	Hiratsuka Athletics Stadium
JST (UTC+09)

25 July 2001 22	Kyoto Purple Sanga	2-1	Vegalta Sendai	Nishikyogoku Athletic Stadium
JST (UTC+09)

28 July 2001 23	Sagan Tosu	1-0	Kyoto Purple Sanga	Tosu Stadium
JST (UTC+09)

3 August 2001 24	Kawasaki Frontale	0-0 (GG) (a.e.t.)	Kyoto Purple Sanga	Todoroki Athletics Stadium
JST (UTC+09)

11 August 2001 25	Kyoto Purple Sanga	1-0	Mito HollyHock	Nishikyogoku Athletic Stadium
JST (UTC+09)

14 August 2001 26	Yokohama FC	1-2	Kyoto Purple Sanga	Yokohama Mitsuzawa Stadium
JST (UTC+09)

18 August 2001 27	Kyoto Purple Sanga	2-0	Oita Trinita	Nishikyogoku Athletic Stadium
JST (UTC+09)

25 August 2001 28	Omiya Ardija	0-1	Kyoto Purple Sanga	Omiya Football Stadium
JST (UTC+09)

1 September 2001 29	Kyoto Purple Sanga	1-2	Shonan Bellmare	Nishikyogoku Athletic Stadium
JST (UTC+09)

5 September 2001 30	Vegalta Sendai	0-0 (GG) (a.e.t.)	Kyoto Purple Sanga	Sendai Stadium
JST (UTC+09)

8 September 2001 31	Kyoto Purple Sanga	2-0	Ventforet Kofu	Nishikyogoku Athletic Stadium
JST (UTC+09)

15 September 2001 32	Kyoto Purple Sanga	2-0	Albirex Niigata	Nishikyogoku Athletic Stadium
JST (UTC+09)

19 September 2001 33	Montedio Yamagata	4-3	Kyoto Purple Sanga	Yamagata Park Stadium
JST (UTC+09)

22 September 2001 34	Mito HollyHock	0-1 (GG) (a.e.t.)	Kyoto Purple Sanga	Hitachinaka City Stadium
JST (UTC+09)

29 September 2001 35	Kyoto Purple Sanga	0-1	Omiya Ardija	Nishikyogoku Athletic Stadium
JST (UTC+09)

6 October 2001 36	Oita Trinita	0-1	Kyoto Purple Sanga	Oita Athletic Stadium
JST (UTC+09)

13 October 2001 37	Kyoto Purple Sanga	2-3	Yokohama FC	Nishikyogoku Athletic Stadium
JST (UTC+09)

17 October 2001 38	Ventforet Kofu	0-2	Kyoto Purple Sanga	Kose Sports Park Stadium
JST (UTC+09)

20 October 2001 39	Kyoto Purple Sanga	2-1	Sagan Tosu	Nishikyogoku Athletic Stadium
JST (UTC+09)

28 October 2001 40	Kyoto Purple Sanga	0-0 (GG) (a.e.t.)	Montedio Yamagata	Nishikyogoku Athletic Stadium
JST (UTC+09)

3 November 2001 41	Albirex Niigata	2-3 (GG) (a.e.t.)	Kyoto Purple Sanga	Niigata Stadium
JST (UTC+09)

6 November 2001 42	Kyoto Purple Sanga	3-2 (GG) (a.e.t.)	Kawasaki Frontale	Nishikyogoku Athletic Stadium
JST (UTC+09)

10 November 2001 43	Shonan Bellmare	1-2	Kyoto Purple Sanga	Hiratsuka Athletics Stadium
JST (UTC+09)

18 November 2001 44	Kyoto Purple Sanga	0-1	Vegalta Sendai	Nishikyogoku Athletic Stadium
JST (UTC+09)

=== Emperor's Cup ===
25 November 2001 1st Round	Nirasaki Astoros	0-4	Kyoto Purple Sanga	Kose Sports Park Stadium
JST (UTC+09)

2 December 2001 2nd Round	Kyoto Purple Sanga	3-0	Gunma Fortona	Nishikyogoku Athletic Stadium
JST (UTC+09)

9 December 2001 3rd Round	Yokohama F. Marinos	0-1	Kyoto Purple Sanga	Yokohama Mitsuzawa Stadium
JST (UTC+09)

16 December 2001 4th Round	Kyoto Purple Sanga	0-4	JEF United Ichihara	Nagasaki Athletic Stadium
JST (UTC+09)

=== J.League Cup ===
4 April 2001 1st Round-1	Kyoto Purple Sanga	0-2	Gamba Osaka	Nishikyogoku Athletic Stadium
JST (UTC+09)

18 April 2001 1st Round-2	Gamba Osaka	2-0 (4-0 agg.)	Kyoto Purple Sanga	Osaka Expo '70 Stadium
JST (UTC+09)

== Player statistics ==
No.	Pos.	Nat.	Player	D.o.B. (Age)	Height / Weight	J.League 2		Emperor's Cup		J.League Cup		Total	
No.	Pos.	Nat.	Player	D.o.B. (Age)	Height / Weight	Apps	Goals	Apps	Goals	Apps	Goals	Apps	Goals
1	GK	(Japan)	Naohito Hirai	July 16, 1978 (aged 22)	cm / kg	15	0						
2	DF	(Japan)	Hiroshi Noguchi	February 25, 1972 (aged 29)	cm / kg	40	4						
3	DF	(Japan)	Tadashi Nakamura	June 10, 1971 (aged 29)	cm / kg	26	2						
4	DF	(Japan)	Naoto Otake	October 18, 1968 (aged 32)	cm / kg	18	2						
5	DF	(Japan)	Kazuki Teshima	June 7, 1979 (aged 21)	cm / kg	42	0						
6	DF	(Japan)	Jin Sato	September 27, 1974 (aged 26)	cm / kg	24	1						
7	MF	(South Korea)	Park Ji-Sung	February 25, 1981 (aged 20)	cm / kg	38	3						
8	MF	(Japan)	Makoto Atsuta	September 16, 1976 (aged 24)	cm / kg	37	3						
9	FW	(Japan)	Teruaki Kurobe	March 6, 1978 (aged 23)	cm / kg	41	30						
10	MF	(Japan)	Daisuke Matsui	May 11, 1981 (aged 19)	cm / kg	37	7						
11	MF	(Japan)	Kiyotaka Ishimaru	October 30, 1973 (aged 27)	cm / kg	37	3						
12	GK	(Japan)	Masahiko Nakagawa	August 26, 1969 (aged 31)	cm / kg	29	0						
13	MF	(Japan)	Kenji Miyazaki	June 24, 1977 (aged 23)	cm / kg	4	0						
14	MF	(Japan)	Michiyasu Osada	March 5, 1978 (aged 23)	cm / kg	7	0						
15	MF	(Japan)	Tomoaki Matsukawa	April 18, 1973 (aged 27)	cm / kg	36	3						
16	DF	(Japan)	Shigeki Tsujimoto	June 23, 1979 (aged 21)	cm / kg	20	2						
17	MF	(Japan)	Shinya Tomita	May 8, 1980 (aged 20)	cm / kg	11	0						
18	FW	(Japan)	Yusaku Ueno	November 1, 1973 (aged 27)	cm / kg	42	10						
19	MF	(Japan)	Hiroshi Otsuki	April 23, 1980 (aged 20)	cm / kg	0	0						
20	FW	(South Korea)	An Hyo-Yeon	April 16, 1978 (aged 22)	cm / kg	39	8						
21	GK	(Japan)	Hideaki Ueno	May 31, 1981 (aged 19)	cm / kg	0	0						
22	MF	(Japan)	Daisuke Saito	August 29, 1980 (aged 20)	cm / kg	0	0						
23	DF	(Japan)	Masato Kawaguchi	June 18, 1981 (aged 19)	cm / kg	0	0						
24	FW	(Japan)	Kentaro Yoshida	October 5, 1980 (aged 20)	cm / kg	2	0						
25	DF	(Japan)	Kazuhiro Suzuki	November 16, 1976 (aged 24)	cm / kg	29	0						
26	DF	(Japan)	Shuichi Kamimura	September 1, 1981 (aged 19)	cm / kg	0	0						
27	DF	(Japan)	Makoto Kakuda	July 10, 1983 (aged 17)	cm / kg	8	0						
28	GK	(Japan)	Hiromasa Takashima	April 17, 1980 (aged 20)	cm / kg	0	0						
29	DF	(Japan)	Hideaki Kubo	March 12, 1979 (aged 21)	cm / kg	0	0						
30	MF	(Japan)	Shohei Yamamoto	August 29, 1982 (aged 18)	cm / kg	0	0						
31	DF	(Japan)	Masayoshi Yoshida	August 4, 1982 (aged 18)	cm / kg	0	0						
32	MF	(Poland)	Piotr Sowisz	September 10, 1971 (aged 29)	cm / kg	11	1						

== Other pages ==
- (in Japanese) J. League official site
