= Shigeki Tsujimoto =

Japanese footballer

Shigeki Tsujimoto 辻本 茂輝
Personal information
- Full name: Shigeki Tsujimoto
- Date of birth: 23 June 1979 (age 47)
- Place of birth: Suita, Osaka, Japan
- Height: 1.80 m (5 ft 11 in)
- Position: Defender

Youth career
- 1995–1997: Kindai University High School

Senior career*
Years	Team	Apps	(Gls)
1998	Yokohama Flügels	0	(0)
1999–2005	Kyoto Purple Sanga	73	(4)
2006	Tokushima Vortis	18	(0)
2007–2008	Sagawa Printing	23	(1)
2009	FC Osaka	1	(0)
Total		115	(5)

International career
1995	Japan U-17	1	(0)
1999	Japan U-20	7	(0)
Medal record
Yokohama Flügels
Winner	Emperor's Cup	1998
Kyoto Purple Sanga
Winner	Emperor's Cup	2002
Representing Japan
FIFA U-20 World Cup
Silver medal – second place	1999 Nigeria
AFC U-16 Championship
Gold medal – first place	1994 Qatar
- * Club domestic league appearances and goals

Shigeki Tsujimoto (辻本 茂輝, Tsujimoto Shigeki; born 23 June 1979) is a former Japanese football player.

== Club career ==
Tsujimoto was born in Suita on 23 June 1979. After graduating from Kindai University High School, he joined Yokohama Flügels in 1998. However the club was disbanded end of 1998 season due to financial strain, he moved to Kyoto Purple Sanga with contemporaries Yasuhito Endo, Kazuki Teshima and so on in 1999. He played for the club until 2005. From 2006, he played for Tokushima Vortis (2006), Sagawa Printing (2007–08) and FC Osaka (2009). He retired at the end of the 2009 season.

== National team career ==
In August 1995, Tsujimoto was selected Japan U-17 national team for 1995 U-17 World Championship and he played 1 match. In April 1999, he was also selected Japan U-20 national team for 1999 World Youth Championship. At 1999 World Youth Championship, he played as right back of three back defense with Kazuki Teshima and Koji Nakata. He played full-time in all 7 matches and Japan won the 2nd place.

== Career statistics ==
Appearances and goals by club, season and competition
Club	Season	League			Emperor's Cup		J.League Cup		Total	
Club	Season	Division	Apps	Goals	Apps	Goals	Apps	Goals	Apps	Goals
Yokohama Flügels	1998	J1 League	0	0	0	0	0	0	0	0
Kyoto Purple Sanga	1999	J1 League	9	0	2	0	2	0	13	0
Kyoto Purple Sanga	2000	J1 League	4	0	0	0	1	0	5	0
Kyoto Purple Sanga	2001	J2 League	20	2	4	0	1	0	25	2
Kyoto Purple Sanga	2002	J1 League	13	1	0	0	3	0	16	1
Kyoto Purple Sanga	2003	J1 League	8	0	1	0	2	0	11	0
Kyoto Purple Sanga	2004	J2 League	18	1	1	2	—		19	3
Kyoto Purple Sanga	2005	J2 League	1	0	1	0	—		2	0
Tokushima Vortis	2006	J2 League	18	0	1	0	—		19	0
Sagawa Printing	2007	Football League	19	1	0	0	—		19	1
Sagawa Printing	2008	Football League	4	0	0	0	—		4	0
Career total			114	5	10	2	9	0	133	7

== Honors and awards ==
- FIFA World Youth Championship runner-up: 1999
