= 2000 Kyoto Purple Sanga season =

Kyoto Purple Sanga
2000 season
- Manager: Shu Kamo; Gert Engels
- Stadium: Nishikyogoku Athletic Stadium
- J.League 1: 15th
- Emperor's Cup: 3rd Round
- J.League Cup: Semifinals
- Top goalscorer: Kazuyoshi Miura (17)
Home colours	Away colours

2000 Kyoto Purple Sanga season

== Competitions ==
Competitions	Position
J.League 1	15th / 16 clubs
Emperor's Cup	3rd round
J.League Cup	Semifinals

== Domestic results ==
=== J.League 1 ===
11 March 2000 1-1	JEF United Ichihara	6-1	Kyoto Purple Sanga	Ichihara Seaside Stadium
JST (UTC+09)

18 March 2000 1-2	Kyoto Purple Sanga	1-3	Cerezo Osaka	Nishikyogoku Athletic Stadium
JST (UTC+09)

25 March 2000 1-3	Kyoto Purple Sanga	1-0	Gamba Osaka	Nishikyogoku Athletic Stadium
JST (UTC+09)

1 April 2000 1-4	Sanfrecce Hiroshima	2-0	Kyoto Purple Sanga	Hiroshima Big Arch
JST (UTC+09)

5 April 2000 1-5	Kyoto Purple Sanga	0-1	Nagoya Grampus Eight	Nishikyogoku Athletic Stadium
JST (UTC+09)

8 April 2000 1-6	Kashiwa Reysol	2-1 (GG) (a.e.t.)	Kyoto Purple Sanga	Hitachi Kashiwa Soccer Stadium
JST (UTC+09)

15 April 2000 1-7	Kawasaki Frontale	2-1	Kyoto Purple Sanga	Todoroki Athletics Stadium
JST (UTC+09)

22 April 2000 1-8	Kyoto Purple Sanga	1-2 (GG) (a.e.t.)	Shimizu S-Pulse	Nishikyogoku Athletic Stadium
JST (UTC+09)

29 April 2000 1-9	FC Tokyo	3-0	Kyoto Purple Sanga	Kagoshima Kamoike Stadium
JST (UTC+09)

3 May 2000 1-10	Kyoto Purple Sanga	3-4 (GG) (a.e.t.)	Avispa Fukuoka	Nishikyogoku Athletic Stadium
JST (UTC+09)

6 May 2000 1-11	Yokohama F. Marinos	2-1	Kyoto Purple Sanga	International Stadium Yokohama
JST (UTC+09)

13 May 2000 1-12	Kyoto Purple Sanga	3-2	Vissel Kobe	Nishikyogoku Athletic Stadium
JST (UTC+09)

17 May 2000 1-13	Verdy Kawasaki	1-1 (GG) (a.e.t.)	Kyoto Purple Sanga	Tokyo National Stadium
JST (UTC+09)

20 May 2000 1-14	Kyoto Purple Sanga	2-3 (GG) (a.e.t.)	Júbilo Iwata	Kagoshima Kamoike Stadium
JST (UTC+09)

27 May 2000 1-15	Kashima Antlers	3-0	Kyoto Purple Sanga	Kashima Soccer Stadium
JST (UTC+09)

24 June 2000 2-1	Kyoto Purple Sanga	3-2	JEF United Ichihara	Nishikyogoku Athletic Stadium
JST (UTC+09)

1 July 2000 2-2	Cerezo Osaka	2-0	Kyoto Purple Sanga	Osaka Nagai Stadium
JST (UTC+09)

8 July 2000 2-3	Kyoto Purple Sanga	1-3	Yokohama F. Marinos	Tottori Soccer Stadium
JST (UTC+09)

15 July 2000 2-4	Avispa Fukuoka	2-3 (GG) (a.e.t.)	Kyoto Purple Sanga	Hakatanomori Football Stadium
JST (UTC+09)

22 July 2000 2-5	Kyoto Purple Sanga	0-3	FC Tokyo	Nishikyogoku Athletic Stadium
JST (UTC+09)

26 July 2000 2-6	Shimizu S-Pulse	1-1 (GG) (a.e.t.)	Kyoto Purple Sanga	Kusanagi Athletic Stadium
JST (UTC+09)

29 July 2000 2-7	Kyoto Purple Sanga	3-1	Kawasaki Frontale	Nishikyogoku Athletic Stadium
JST (UTC+09)

5 August 2000 2-8	Kyoto Purple Sanga	3-1	Sanfrecce Hiroshima	Nishikyogoku Athletic Stadium
JST (UTC+09)

12 August 2000 2-9	Gamba Osaka	3-0	Kyoto Purple Sanga	Osaka Expo '70 Stadium
JST (UTC+09)

19 August 2000 2-10	Kyoto Purple Sanga	1-2	Kashiwa Reysol	Nishikyogoku Athletic Stadium
JST (UTC+09)

8 November 2000 2-11	Nagoya Grampus Eight	0-1	Kyoto Purple Sanga	Mizuho Athletic Stadium
JST (UTC+09)

11 November 2000 2-12	Kyoto Purple Sanga	1-3	Kashima Antlers	Nishikyogoku Athletic Stadium
JST (UTC+09)

18 November 2000 2-13	Júbilo Iwata	3-2	Kyoto Purple Sanga	Júbilo Iwata Stadium
JST (UTC+09)

23 November 2000 2-14	Kyoto Purple Sanga	3-2	Verdy Kawasaki	Nishikyogoku Athletic Stadium
JST (UTC+09)

26 November 2000 2-15	Vissel Kobe	2-1 (GG) (a.e.t.)	Kyoto Purple Sanga	Kobe Universiade Memorial Stadium
JST (UTC+09)

=== Emperor's Cup ===
1st Round	bye

2nd Round	bye

10 December 2000 3rd Round	Kyoto Purple Sanga	0-1	Consadole Sapporo	Nishikyogoku Athletic Stadium
JST (UTC+09)

=== J.League Cup ===
12 April 2000 1st Round-1	Albirex Niigata	0-1	Kyoto Purple Sanga	Niigata City Athletic Stadium
JST (UTC+09)

19 April 2000 1st Round-2	Kyoto Purple Sanga	3-1 (4-1 agg.)	Albirex Niigata	Nishikyogoku Athletic Stadium
JST (UTC+09)

5 July 2000 2nd Round-1	Kyoto Purple Sanga	1-1	FC Tokyo	Nishikyogoku Athletic Stadium
JST (UTC+09)

12 July 2000 2nd Round-2	FC Tokyo	0-1 (1-2 agg.)	Kyoto Purple Sanga	Edogawa Stadium
JST (UTC+09)

30 August 2000 Quarterfinals-1	Júbilo Iwata	1-1	Kyoto Purple Sanga	Júbilo Iwata Stadium
JST (UTC+09)

6 September 2000 Quarterfinals-2	Kyoto Purple Sanga	2-1 (GG) (a.e.t.) (3-2 agg.)	Júbilo Iwata	Nishikyogoku Athletic Stadium
JST (UTC+09)

11 October 2000 Semifinals-1	Kyoto Purple Sanga	0-2	Kawasaki Frontale	Nishikyogoku Athletic Stadium
JST (UTC+09)

18 October 2000 Semifinals-2	Kawasaki Frontale	1-2 (GG) (a.e.t.) (3-2 agg.)	Kyoto Purple Sanga	Tokyo National Stadium
JST (UTC+09)

== Player statistics ==
No.	Pos.	Nat.	Player	D.o.B. (Age)	Height / Weight	J.League 1		Emperor's Cup		J.League Cup		Total	
No.	Pos.	Nat.	Player	D.o.B. (Age)	Height / Weight	Apps	Goals	Apps	Goals	Apps	Goals	Apps	Goals
1	GK	(Japan)	Shigetatsu Matsunaga	August 12, 1962 (aged 37)	cm / kg	15	0						
2	DF	(Japan)	Hiroshi Noguchi	February 25, 1972 (aged 28)	cm / kg	30	1						
3	DF	(Japan)	Tadashi Nakamura	June 10, 1971 (aged 28)	cm / kg	25	0						
4	DF	(Japan)	Naoto Otake	October 18, 1968 (aged 31)	cm / kg	23	0						
5	DF	(Brazil)	Edinho Baiano	July 27, 1967 (aged 32)	cm / kg	24	0						
6	DF	(Japan)	Jin Sato	September 27, 1974 (aged 25)	cm / kg	17	2						
7	MF	(Japan)	Kazuki Sato	June 27, 1974 (aged 25)	cm / kg	13	0						
8	MF	(Brazil)	Fabricio	January 29, 1982 (aged 18)	cm / kg	1	0						
8	MF	(Japan)	Shigeyoshi Mochizuki	July 9, 1973 (aged 26)	cm / kg	9	0						
9	MF	(Japan)	Tomoaki Matsukawa	April 18, 1973 (aged 26)	cm / kg	7	0						
10	FW	(Brazil)	Regis	September 22, 1976 (aged 23)	cm / kg	21	4						
11	FW	(Japan)	Kazuyoshi Miura	February 26, 1967 (aged 33)	cm / kg	30	17						
12	GK	(Japan)	Masahiko Nakagawa	August 26, 1969 (aged 30)	cm / kg	0	0						
12	MF	(South Korea)	Park Ji-Sung	February 25, 1981 (aged 19)	cm / kg	13	1						
13	MF	(Japan)	Makoto Atsuta	September 16, 1976 (aged 23)	cm / kg	18	5						
14	MF	(Japan)	Yasuhito Endō	January 28, 1980 (aged 20)	cm / kg	29	5						
15	MF	(Japan)	Kenji Miyazaki	June 24, 1977 (aged 22)	cm / kg	18	0						
16	FW	(Japan)	Teruaki Kurobe	March 6, 1978 (aged 22)	cm / kg	12	0						
17	DF	(Japan)	Kazuki Teshima	June 7, 1979 (aged 20)	cm / kg	21	0						
18	FW	(Japan)	Hideo Ōshima	March 7, 1980 (aged 20)	cm / kg	0	0						
19	MF	(Japan)	Hiroshi Otsuki	April 23, 1980 (aged 19)	cm / kg	2	0						
20	DF	(Japan)	Shigeki Tsujimoto	June 23, 1979 (aged 20)	cm / kg	4	0						
21	GK	(Japan)	Naohito Hirai	July 16, 1978 (aged 21)	cm / kg	15	0						
22	FW	(Japan)	Shinya Mitsuoka	April 22, 1976 (aged 23)	cm / kg	0	0						
23	DF	(Japan)	Masato Kawaguchi	June 18, 1981 (aged 18)	cm / kg	1	0						
24	MF	(Japan)	Shinya Tomita	May 8, 1980 (aged 19)	cm / kg	4	0						
25	MF	(Japan)	Daisuke Saito	August 29, 1980 (aged 19)	cm / kg	7	0						
26	MF	(Japan)	Daisuke Matsui	May 11, 1981 (aged 18)	cm / kg	22	1						
27	FW	(Japan)	Kentaro Yoshida	October 5, 1980 (aged 19)	cm / kg	5	1						
28	GK	(Japan)	Hideaki Ueno	May 31, 1981 (aged 18)	cm / kg	0	0						
29	FW	(Japan)	Hiroyasu Kawakatsu	September 19, 1975 (aged 24)	cm / kg	0	0						
30	DF	(Japan)	Masato Yamasaki	April 7, 1980 (aged 19)	cm / kg	0	0						
31	DF	(Japan)	Kazuma Miki	August 5, 1977 (aged 22)	cm / kg	0	0						
32	DF	(Japan)	Shuichi Kamimura	September 1, 1981 (aged 18)	cm / kg	0	0						
34	GK	(Japan)	Hiromasa Takashima	April 17, 1980 (aged 19)	cm / kg	0	0						
35	MF	(Japan)	Takashi Hirano	July 15, 1974 (aged 25)	cm / kg	7	1						
