= 2004 Kyoto Purple Sanga season =

Kyoto Purple Sanga
2004 season
- Manager: Akihiro Nishimura; Koichi Hashiratani
- Stadium: Nishikyogoku Athletic Stadium
- J. League 2: 5th
- Emperor's Cup: 4th Round
- Top goalscorer: Choi Yong-Soo (20)
| Home colours | Away colours |

During the 2004 season, Kyoto Purple Sanga competed in the J. League 2, the second tier of Japanese football, in which they finished 5th.

== Competitions ==
| Competitions | Position |
|---|---|
| J. League 2 | 5th / 12 clubs |
| Emperor's Cup | 4th Round |

== Domestic results ==
=== J. League 2 ===
| Match | Date | Venue | Opponents | Score |
|---|---|---|---|---|
| 1 | 2004.. | [[]] | [[]] | - |
| 2 | 2004.. | [[]] | [[]] | - |
| 3 | 2004.. | [[]] | [[]] | - |
| 4 | 2004.. | [[]] | [[]] | - |
| 5 | 2004.. | [[]] | [[]] | - |
| 6 | 2004.. | [[]] | [[]] | - |
| 7 | 2004.. | [[]] | [[]] | - |
| 8 | 2004.. | [[]] | [[]] | - |
| 9 | 2004.. | [[]] | [[]] | - |
| 10 | 2004.. | [[]] | [[]] | - |
| 11 | 2004.. | [[]] | [[]] | - |
| 12 | 2004.. | [[]] | [[]] | - |
| 13 | 2004.. | [[]] | [[]] | - |
| 14 | 2004.. | [[]] | [[]] | - |
| 15 | 2004.. | [[]] | [[]] | - |
| 16 | 2004.. | [[]] | [[]] | - |
| 17 | 2004.. | [[]] | [[]] | - |
| 18 | 2004.. | [[]] | [[]] | - |
| 19 | 2004.. | [[]] | [[]] | - |
| 20 | 2004.. | [[]] | [[]] | - |
| 21 | 2004.. | [[]] | [[]] | - |
| 22 | 2004.. | [[]] | [[]] | - |
| 23 | 2004.. | [[]] | [[]] | - |
| 24 | 2004.. | [[]] | [[]] | - |
| 25 | 2004.. | [[]] | [[]] | - |
| 26 | 2004.. | [[]] | [[]] | - |
| 27 | 2004.. | [[]] | [[]] | - |
| 28 | 2004.. | [[]] | [[]] | - |
| 29 | 2004.. | [[]] | [[]] | - |
| 30 | 2004.. | [[]] | [[]] | - |
| 31 | 2004.. | [[]] | [[]] | - |
| 32 | 2004.. | [[]] | [[]] | - |
| 33 | 2004.. | [[]] | [[]] | - |
| 34 | 2004.. | [[]] | [[]] | - |
| 35 | 2004.. | [[]] | [[]] | - |
| 36 | 2004.. | [[]] | [[]] | - |
| 37 | 2004.. | [[]] | [[]] | - |
| 38 | 2004.. | [[]] | [[]] | - |
| 39 | 2004.. | [[]] | [[]] | - |
| 40 | 2004.. | [[]] | [[]] | - |
| 41 | 2004.. | [[]] | [[]] | - |
| 42 | 2004.. | [[]] | [[]] | - |
| 43 | 2004.. | [[]] | [[]] | - |
| 44 | 2004.. | [[]] | [[]] | - |

=== Emperor's Cup ===
| Match | Date | Venue | Opponents | Score |
|---|---|---|---|---|
| 3rd Round | 2004.. | [[]] | [[]] | - |
| 4th Round | 2004.. | [[]] | [[]] | - |

== Player statistics ==
| No. | Pos. | Player | D.o.B. (Age) | Height / Weight | J. League 2 | | Emperor's Cup | | Total | |
| No. | Pos. | Player | D.o.B. (Age) | Height / Weight | Apps | Goals | Apps | Goals | Apps | Goals |
|---|---|---|---|---|---|---|---|---|---|---|
| 1 | GK | Naohito Hirai | July 16, 1978 (aged 25) | cm / kg | 26 | 0 | | | | |
| 2 | DF | Satoru Suzuki | July 19, 1975 (aged 28) | cm / kg | 27 | 1 | | | | |
| 3 | DF | Tadashi Nakamura | June 10, 1971 (aged 32) | cm / kg | 4 | 0 | | | | |
| 4 | DF | Kazuhiro Suzuki | November 16, 1976 (aged 27) | cm / kg | 35 | 0 | | | | |
| 5 | DF | Kazuki Teshima | June 7, 1979 (aged 24) | cm / kg | 35 | 2 | | | | |
| 6 | MF | Kiyotaka Ishimaru | October 30, 1973 (aged 30) | cm / kg | 34 | 2 | | | | |
| 7 | MF | Shinya Tomita | May 8, 1980 (aged 23) | cm / kg | 31 | 1 | | | | |
| 8 | MF | Kim Do-Kyun | January 13, 1977 (aged 27) | cm / kg | 17 | 0 | | | | |
| 9 | FW | Teruaki Kurobe | March 6, 1978 (aged 26) | cm / kg | 35 | 9 | | | | |
| 10 | MF | Daisuke Matsui | May 11, 1981 (aged 22) | cm / kg | 17 | 2 | | | | |
| 11 | FW | Yutaka Tahara | April 27, 1982 (aged 21) | cm / kg | 26 | 6 | | | | |
| 13 | MF | Biju | September 17, 1974 (aged 29) | cm / kg | 14 | 1 | | | | |
| 13 | MF | Leandro Vieira | April 3, 1979 (aged 24) | cm / kg | 1 | 0 | | | | |
| 14 | MF | Daisuke Nakaharai | May 22, 1977 (aged 26) | cm / kg | 39 | 6 | | | | |
| 15 | MF | Hiroki Nakayama | December 13, 1985 (aged 18) | cm / kg | 19 | 3 | | | | |
| 16 | MF | Daisuke Saito | August 29, 1980 (aged 23) | cm / kg | 21 | 0 | | | | |
| 17 | MF | Makoto Atsuta | September 16, 1976 (aged 27) | cm / kg | 34 | 5 | | | | |
| 18 | GK | Hideaki Ueno | May 31, 1981 (aged 22) | cm / kg | 0 | 0 | | | | |
| 19 | MF | Atsushi Mio | January 26, 1983 (aged 21) | cm / kg | 28 | 6 | | | | |
| 20 | FW | Ryuta Hara | April 19, 1981 (aged 22) | cm / kg | 12 | 0 | | | | |
| 21 | FW | Choi Yong-Soo | September 10, 1973 (aged 30) | cm / kg | 33 | 20 | | | | |
| 22 | MF | Daigo Watanabe | December 3, 1984 (aged 19) | cm / kg | 18 | 0 | | | | |
| 23 | MF | Masayuki Maegawa | June 20, 1984 (aged 19) | cm / kg | 1 | 0 | | | | |
| 24 | FW | Noboru Kohara | July 22, 1983 (aged 20) | cm / kg | 2 | 0 | | | | |
| 25 | DF | Shigeki Tsujimoto | June 23, 1979 (aged 24) | cm / kg | 18 | 1 | | | | |
| 26 | GK | Koji Nishimura | July 7, 1984 (aged 19) | cm / kg | 19 | 0 | | | | |
| 27 | DF | Shigenori Hagimura | July 31, 1976 (aged 27) | cm / kg | 19 | 0 | | | | |
| 28 | GK | Satoshi Hashida | December 20, 1981 (aged 22) | cm / kg | 0 | 0 | | | | |
| 29 | DF | Yusuke Mori | July 24, 1980 (aged 23) | cm / kg | 18 | 0 | | | | |
| 30 | MF | Takuya Muguruma | June 13, 1984 (aged 19) | cm / kg | 10 | 0 | | | | |
| 31 | MF | Hideaki Ikematsu | January 10, 1986 (aged 18) | cm / kg | 2 | 0 | | | | |
| 32 | DF | Taizan Makimoto | February 8, 1986 (aged 18) | cm / kg | 0 | 0 | | | | |
| 33 | MF | Masamichi Yamada | April 7, 1981 (aged 22) | cm / kg | 0 | 0 | | | | |
| 35 | DF | Takuya Mikami | February 13, 1980 (aged 24) | cm / kg | 19 | 0 | | | | |

== Other pages ==
- (in Japanese) J. League official site
