= Takatoshi =

- Gender: Male

Origin
- Origin: Japanese
- Meaning: Different meanings depending on the kanji used

Takatoshi (written: 高資, 高俊, 高利, 高松, 孝駿, 隆敏, 貴俊, 鷹俊, 昂聡 or 宝寿) is a masculine Japanese given name. Notable people with the name include:

- Takatoshi Abe (安部 孝駿; born 1991), Japanese hurdler
- Ikoma Takatoshi (生駒 高俊; 1611–1659), Japanese daimyō
- Takatoshi Ito (伊藤 隆敏; born 1950), Japanese economist and academic
- Takatoshi Kaneko (金子 貴俊; born 1978), Japanese actor
- Takatoshi Matsumoto (松本 昂聡; born 1983), Japanese footballer
- Mitsui Takatoshi (三井 高利; 1622–1694), Japanese businessman
- Yokota Takatoshi (横田 高松; 1487–1550), Japanese samurai
