= Tomoaki Matsukawa =

Japanese footballer

Tomoaki Matsukawa 松川 友明
Personal information
- Full name: Tomoaki Matsukawa
- Date of birth: April 18, 1973 (age 53)
- Place of birth: Kanagawa, Japan
- Height: 1.72 m (5 ft 7 1/2 in)
- Position: Midfielder

Youth career
- 1989–1991: Toin Gakuen High School
- 1992–1995: Komazawa University

Senior career*
Years	Team	Apps	(Gls)
1996–1999	Bellmare Hiratsuka	79	(5)
2000–2002	Kyoto Purple Sanga	46	(3)
2002	Consadole Sapporo	4	(0)
2003	YKK	16	(1)
Total		145	(9)
Medal record
Kyoto Purple Sanga
Winner	Emperor's Cup	2002
- * Club domestic league appearances and goals

Tomoaki Matsukawa (松川 友明, Matsukawa Tomoaki; born April 18, 1973) is a former Japanese football player.

== Playing career ==
Matsukawa was born in Kanagawa Prefecture on April 18, 1973. After graduating from Komazawa University, he joined J1 League club Bellmare Hiratsuka in 1996. From 1997, he played many matches as central midfielder every season. In 1999 season, the club finished at bottom place and was relegated to J2 League. In 2000, he moved to Kyoto Purple Sanga. However he could not play many matches and the club was relegated to J2. In 2001, he played many matches and the club won the champions and returned to J1 in a year. However he could hardly play in the match in 2002. In August 2002, he moved to Consadole Sapporo. However he could hardly play in the match and the club was relegated to J2. In 2003, he moved to Japan Football League club YKK. He retired end of 2003 season.

== Club statistics ==
Club performance			League		Cup		League Cup		Total	
Season	Club	League	Apps	Goals	Apps	Goals	Apps	Goals	Apps	Goals
Japan			League		Emperor's Cup		J.League Cup		Total	
1996	Bellmare Hiratsuka	J1 League	6	0	0	0	0	0	6	0
1997	Bellmare Hiratsuka	J1 League	23	1	3	0	1	0	27	1
1998	Bellmare Hiratsuka	J1 League	28	3	2	0	4	2	34	5
1999	Bellmare Hiratsuka	J1 League	22	1	1	1	1	0	24	2
2000	Kyoto Purple Sanga	J1 League	7	0	0	0	4	0	11	0
2001	Kyoto Purple Sanga	J2 League	36	3	4	0	1	0	41	3
2002	Kyoto Purple Sanga	J1 League	3	0	0	0	2	0	5	0
2002	Consadole Sapporo	J1 League	4	0	0	0	0	0	4	0
2003	YKK	Football League	16	1	-		-		16	1
Total			145	9	10	1	13	2	168	12
