= Hiroshi Otsuki =

Japanese footballer and manager

Hiroshi Otsuki 大槻 紘士
Personal information
- Full name: Hiroshi Otsuki
- Date of birth: April 23, 1980 (age 46)
- Place of birth: Nagaokakyo, Kyoto, Japan
- Height: 1.65 m (5 ft 5 in)
- Position: Midfielder

Youth career
- 1996–1998: Kyoto Purple Sanga

Senior career*
Years	Team	Apps	(Gls)
1999–2003	Kyoto Purple Sanga	14	(0)
2004–2014	Sagawa Printing Kyoto	304	(32)
Total		318	(32)

Managerial career
- 2015: SP Kyoto FC
- 2020–2023: Reilac Shiga
Medal record
Kyoto Purple Sanga
Winner	Emperor's Cup	2002
- * Club domestic league appearances and goals

Hiroshi Otsuki (大槻 紘士, Otsuki Hiroshi; born April 23, 1980) is a former Japanese football player and manager who was most recently manager of Japan Football League club Reilac Shiga.

== Playing career ==
Otsuki was born in Nagaokakyo on April 23, 1980. He joined J1 League club Kyoto Purple Sanga from the youth team in 1999. He debuted in August and played many matches as substitute defensive midfielder after his debut. However he rarely played in matches from 2000 to 2003. In 2004, he moved to Japan Football League club Sagawa Printing (later Sagawa Printing Kyoto). He became a regular player and played in over 300 matches for the club. His opportunity to play decreased in 2014 and he retired at the end of the 2014 season.

== Coaching career ==
After retiring from playing, Otsuki became manager of SP Kyoto FC in 2015. However, the club was disbanded at the end of the 2015 season.

Otsuki joined Reilac Shiga in 2020. He left the job in 2023.

== Club statistics ==
Club performance			League		Cup		League Cup		Total	
Season	Club	League	Apps	Goals	Apps	Goals	Apps	Goals	Apps	Goals
Japan			League		Emperor's Cup		J.League Cup		Total	
1999	Kyoto Purple Sanga	J1 League	10	0	1	0	0	0	11	0
2000	Kyoto Purple Sanga	J1 League	2	0	0	0	0	0	2	0
2001	Kyoto Purple Sanga	J2 League	0	0	0	0	0	0	0	0
2002	Kyoto Purple Sanga	J1 League	2	0	0	0	0	0	2	0
2003	Kyoto Purple Sanga	J1 League	0	0	0	0	0	0	0	0
2004	Sagawa Printing	Football League	28	4	2	0	-		30	4
2005	Sagawa Printing	Football League	29	4	3	2	-		32	6
2006	Sagawa Printing	Football League	32	2	-		-		32	2
2007	Sagawa Printing	Football League	31	2	2	0	-		33	2
2008	Sagawa Printing	Football League	21	0	3	1	-		24	1
2009	Sagawa Printing	Football League	34	6	2	0	-		36	6
2010	Sagawa Printing	Football League	32	7	1	0	-		33	7
2011	Sagawa Printing	Football League	31	3	2	1	-		33	4
2012	Sagawa Printing	Football League	27	1	-		-		27	1
2013	Sagawa Printing	Football League	32	2	2	0	-		34	2
2014	Sagawa Printing Kyoto	Football League	7	1	-		-		7	1
Total			318	32	18	4	0	0	336	36
