= Atsushi Mio =

Japanese footballer

Atsushi Mio 美尾 敦
Personal information
- Full name: Atsushi Mio
- Date of birth: January 26, 1983 (age 43)
- Place of birth: Yokohama, Kanagawa, Japan
- Height: 1.70 m (5 ft 7 in)
- Position: Midfielder

Youth career
- 1998–2000: Shonan Bellmare

Senior career*
Years	Team	Apps	(Gls)
2001	Ventforet Kofu	33	(2)
2002–2007	Kyoto Sanga FC	94	(10)
2008–2009	Ventforet Kofu	52	(1)
2010–2012	Gainare Tottori	102	(16)
2013–2014	FC Gifu	50	(0)
Total		331	(29)
Medal record
Kyoto Sanga FC
Winner	Emperor's Cup	2002
- * Club domestic league appearances and goals

Atsushi Mio (美尾 敦, Mio Atsushi; born January 26, 1983) is a former Japanese footballer.

== Playing career ==
Mio was born in Yokohama on January 26, 1983. He joined J2 League club Ventforet Kofu from Shonan Bellmare youth team in 2001. He played many matches from first season. In 2002, he moved to J1 League club Kyoto Purple Sanga (later Kyoto Sanga FC). However he could hardly play in the match until 2003 and Sanga was relegated to J2 end of 2003 season. He played many matches under new manager Koichi Hashiratani from 2004. Sanga won the champions in 2005 season and was promoted to J1. Although he played many matches, Sanga finished at the bottom place in 2006 season. Manager Hashiratani resigned end of 2006 season and Mio could hardly play in the match in 2007 season. In 2008, he moved to J2 club Ventforet Kofu for the first time in 7 years. Although he played many matches in 2008 season, his opportunity to play decreased in 2009 season. In 2010, he moved to Japan Football League club Gainare Tottori. He played all 34 matches and Gainare won the champions in 2010 season. Gainare played in J2 from 2011 and he played many matches until 2012. In 2013, he moved to J2 club FC Gifu. Although he played as regular player in 2013, he could not play many matches in 2014 and retired end of 2014 season.

== Club statistics ==
Club performance			League		Cup		League Cup		Total	
Season	Club	League	Apps	Goals	Apps	Goals	Apps	Goals	Apps	Goals
Japan			League		Emperor's Cup		J.League Cup		Total	
2001	Ventforet Kofu	J2 League	33	2	2	0	0	0	35	2
Total			33	2	2	0	0	0	35	2
2002	Kyoto Purple Sanga	J1 League	0	0	0	0	1	0	1	0
2003	Kyoto Purple Sanga	J1 League	2	0	0	0	1	0	3	0
2004	Kyoto Purple Sanga	J2 League	28	6	2	1	-		30	7
2005	Kyoto Purple Sanga	J2 League	39	3	2	0	-		41	3
2006	Kyoto Purple Sanga	J1 League	20	1	0	0	2	0	22	1
2007	Kyoto Sanga FC	J2 League	5	0	1	0	-		6	0
Total			94	10	5	1	4	0	103	11
2008	Ventforet Kofu	J2 League	32	1	2	0	-		34	1
2009	Ventforet Kofu	J2 League	20	0	1	0	-		21	0
Total			52	1	3	0	-		55	1
2010	Gainare Tottori	Football League	34	7	1	1	-		35	8
2011	Gainare Tottori	J2 League	26	5	1	0	-		27	5
2012	Gainare Tottori	J2 League	42	4	2	1	-		44	5
Total			102	16	4	2	-		106	18
2013	FC Gifu	J2 League	40	0	1	0	-		41	0
2014	FC Gifu	J2 League	10	0	0	0	-		10	0
Total			50	0	1	0	-		51	0
Career total			331	29	15	3	4	0	350	32
