= Hiroyasu =

Masculine Japanese given name

- Gender: Male

Origin
- Origin: Japanese
- Meaning: Different meanings depending on the kanji used

Hiroyasu (written: 宏保, 浩靖, 浩康, 博恭, 博康, 寛裕 or 仁康) is a masculine Japanese given name. Notable people with the name include:

- Hiroyasu Aizawa (会沢 仁康; born 1961), Japanese ski jumper
- Prince Fushimi Hiroyasu (伏見宮博恭王, Fushimi-no-miya Hiroyasu ō; 1875–1946), Japanese prince and admiral
- Hiroyasu Ibata (井幡 博康; born 1974), Japanese footballer
- Hiroyasu Kawakatsu (川勝 博康; born 1975), Japanese footballer
- Hiroyasu Koga (古賀 浩靖), member of Tatenokai
- Hiroyasu Sasaki (佐々木 博康), Japanese mime
- Hiroyasu Shimizu (清水 宏保; born 1974), Japanese speed skater
- Hiroyasu Tamakawa (born 1995), Japanese handball player
- Hiroyasu Tanaka (田中 浩康; born 1982), Japanese baseball player
- Hiroyasu Tsuchie (土江 寛裕; born 1974), Japanese sprinter
