= Tadashi Nakamura (footballer) =

Japanese footballer and manager

Tadashi Nakamura 中村 忠
Personal information
- Full name: Tadashi Nakamura
- Date of birth: June 10, 1971 (age 55)
- Place of birth: Mizuho, Tokyo, Japan
- Height: 1.75 m (5 ft 9 in)
- Position: Defender

Youth career
- 1987–1989: Yomiuri

Senior career*
Years	Team	Apps	(Gls)
1990–1999	Verdy Kawasaki	177	(4)
1999	Urawa Reds	15	(0)
2000–2004	Kyoto Purple Sanga	96	(2)
Total		291	(6)

International career
1995–1998	Japan	16	(0)

Managerial career
- 2016–2017: FC Tokyo U-23
Medal record
Verdy Kawasaki
Winner	Japan Soccer League	1990/91
Winner	Japan Soccer League	1991/92
Winner	J1 League	1993
Winner	J1 League	1994
Runner-up	J1 League	1995
Winner	JSL Cup	1991
Winner	J.League Cup	1992
Winner	J.League Cup	1993
Winner	J.League Cup	1994
Runner-up	J.League Cup	1996
Winner	Emperor's Cup	1996
Runner-up	Emperor's Cup	1991
Runner-up	Emperor's Cup	1992
Kyoto Purple Sanga
Winner	Emperor's Cup	2002
- * Club domestic league appearances and goals

Tadashi Nakamura (中村 忠, Nakamura Tadashi; born June 10, 1971) is a former Japanese football player and manager. He played for Japan national team.

== Club career ==
Nakamura was born in Mizuho, Tokyo on June 10, 1971. He joined Japan Soccer League club Yomiuri (later Verdy Kawasaki) from youth team in 1990. He played as right and left side-back. The club won the champions 1990–91, 1991–92 Japan Soccer League and 1991 JSL Cup. In 1992, Japan Soccer League was folded and founded new league J1 League. The club won the champions J1 League 2 times, J.League Cup 3 times and Emperor's Cup 1 time. He moved to Urawa Reds in 1999 and Kyoto Purple Sanga in 2000. He retired at the end of the 2004 season.

== National team career ==
On February 15, 1995, Nakamura debuted for Japan national team against Australia. He also played at 1998 World Cup qualification in 1997. He played 16 games for Japan until 1998.

== Coaching career ==
After retirement, Nakamura started coaching career at Tokyo Verdy in 2005. He coached for youth team. He moved to FC Tokyo in 2012 and coached for youth team. In July 2017, he became a coach for top team and a manager for FC Tokyo U-23. He resigned in 2017.

== Club statistics ==
Club performance			League		Cup		League Cup		Total	
Season	Club	League	Apps	Goals	Apps	Goals	Apps	Goals	Apps	Goals
Japan			League		Emperor's Cup		J.League Cup		Total	
1990/91	Yomiuri	JSL Division 1	0	0	0	0	0	0	0	0
1991/92	Yomiuri	JSL Division 1	1	0			1	0	2	0
1992	Verdy Kawasaki	J1 League	-		0	0	0	0	0	0
1993	Verdy Kawasaki	J1 League	34	2	2	0	7	0	43	2
1994	Verdy Kawasaki	J1 League	21	0	1	0	1	0	23	0
1995	Verdy Kawasaki	J1 League	42	0	2	1	-		44	1
1996	Verdy Kawasaki	J1 League	27	1	4	0	16	0	47	1
1997	Verdy Kawasaki	J1 League	15	0	2	0	0	0	17	0
1998	Verdy Kawasaki	J1 League	31	1	0	0	0	0	31	1
1999	Verdy Kawasaki	J1 League	6	0	0	0	1	0	7	0
1999	Urawa Reds	J1 League	15	0	2	0	4	0	21	0
2000	Kyoto Purple Sanga	J1 League	25	0	1	0	7	0	33	0
2001	Kyoto Purple Sanga	J2 League	26	2	4	0	1	0	31	2
2002	Kyoto Purple Sanga	J1 League	24	0	1	0	5	0	30	0
2003	Kyoto Purple Sanga	J1 League	17	0	0	0	2	0	19	0
2004	Kyoto Purple Sanga	J2 League	4	0	0	0	-		4	0
Total			288	6	19	1	45	0	352	7

== National team statistics ==
Japan national team
Year	Apps	Goals
1995	3	0
1996	4	0
1997	8	0
1998	1	0
Total	16	0

== Managerial statistics ==
Team	From	To	Record				
Team	From	To	G	W	D	L	Win %
FC Tokyo U-23	2016	2017	44	17	11	16	38.64
Total			44	17	11	16	38.64
