= Kazuhiro Suzuki =

Japanese footballer

Kazuhiro Suzuki 鈴木 和裕
Personal information
- Full name: Kazuhiro Suzuki
- Date of birth: November 16, 1976 (age 50)
- Place of birth: Tokyo, Japan
- Height: 1.76 m (5 ft 9 1/2 in)
- Position: Defender

Youth career
- 1992–1994: Funabashi High School

Senior career*
Years	Team	Apps	(Gls)
1995–2000	JEF United Ichihara	104	(1)
2001–2006	Kyoto Purple Sanga	147	(1)
2007–2009	Mito HollyHock	109	(0)
Total		360	(2)

International career
1993	Japan U-17	4	(0)
1995	Japan U-20	4	(0)
Medal record
JEF United Ichihara
Runner-up	J.League Cup	1998
Kyoto Purple Sanga
Winner	Emperor's Cup	2002
- * Club domestic league appearances and goals

Kazuhiro Suzuki (鈴木 和裕, Suzuki Kazuhiro; born November 16, 1976) is a former Japanese football player.

== Club career ==
Suzuki was born in Tokyo on November 16, 1976. After graduating from high school, he joined JEF United Ichihara with Takayuki Chano in 1995. He played many matches from first season. However his opportunity to play decreased and he moved to Kyoto Purple Sanga in 2001. He played many matches and the club won 2002 Emperor's Cup their first major title. In 2006, he could hardly play in the match and moved to Mito HollyHock in 2007. He retired at the end of the 2009 season.

== National team career ==
In August 1993, Suzuki was selected Japan U-17 national team for 1993 U-17 World Championship. He played full time in all 4 matches. In April 1995, he was also selected Japan U-20 national team for 1995 World Youth Championship and he played all 4 matches as left defender of three back defense.

== Career statistics ==
Appearances and goals by club, season and competition
Club	Season	League			Emperor's Cup		J.League Cup		Total	
Club	Season	Division	Apps	Goals	Apps	Goals	Apps	Goals	Apps	Goals
JEF United Ichihara	1995	J1 League	33	0	1	0	—		34	0
JEF United Ichihara	1996	J1 League	9	0	1	0	6	0	16	0
JEF United Ichihara	1997	J1 League	27	0	2	0	8	0	37	0
JEF United Ichihara	1998	J1 League	19	1	1	0	4	0	24	1
JEF United Ichihara	1999	J1 League	8	0	1	0	1	0	10	0
JEF United Ichihara	2000	J1 League	8	0	0	0	0	0	8	0
Kyoto Purple Sanga	2001	J2 League	29	0	3	0	2	0	34	0
Kyoto Purple Sanga	2002	J1 League	28	0	5	0	6	0	39	0
Kyoto Purple Sanga	2003	J1 League	16	1	1	0	4	0	21	1
Kyoto Purple Sanga	2004	J2 League	35	0	1	0	—		36	0
Kyoto Purple Sanga	2005	J2 League	36	0	1	0	—		37	0
Kyoto Purple Sanga	2006	J1 League	3	0	0	0	2	0	5	0
Mito HollyHock	2007	J2 League	44	0	1	0	—		45	0
Mito HollyHock	2008	J2 League	29	0	1	0	—		30	0
Mito HollyHock	2009	J2 League	36	0	1	0	—		37	0
Career total			360	2	20	0	33	0	413	2
