= Kazuki Teshima =

Japanese footballer

Kazuki Teshima 手島 和希
Personal information
- Full name: Kazuki Teshima
- Date of birth: June 7, 1979 (age 47)
- Place of birth: Iizuka, Fukuoka, Japan
- Height: 1.80 m (5 ft 11 in)
- Position: Defender

Youth career
- 1995–1997: Higashi Fukuoka High School

Senior career*
Years	Team	Apps	(Gls)
1998	Yokohama Flügels	0	(0)
1999–2009	Kyoto Sanga FC	242	(5)
2006	→Gamba Osaka (loan)	0	(0)
Total		242	(5)

International career
1999	Japan U-20	7	(0)
Medal record
Yokohama Flügels
Winner	Emperor's Cup	1998
Kyoto Sanga FC
Winner	Emperor's Cup	2002
Gamba Osaka
Runner-up	Emperor's Cup	2006
Representing Japan
FIFA U-20 World Cup
Silver medal – second place	1999 Nigeria
AFC U-19 Championship
Silver medal – second place	1998 Thailand
- * Club domestic league appearances and goals

Kazuki Teshima (手島 和希, Teshima Kazuki; born June 7, 1979) is a former Japanese football player.

== Club career ==
Teshima was born in Iizuka on June 7, 1979. After graduating from high school, he joined Yokohama Flügels in 1998. However the club was disbanded end of 1998 season due to financial strain, he moved to Kyoto Purple Sanga (later Kyoto Sanga FC) with contemporaries Yasuhito Endo, Shigeki Tsujimoto and so on in 1999. He played many matches as center back. The club won the champions 2002 Emperor's Cup. In 2006, he moved to big club Gamba Osaka. However he could not play in the match and returned to Kyoto in April 2006. In 2009, he lost his opportunity to play and retired at the end of the 2009 season.

== National team career ==
In April 1999, Teshima was selected Japan U-20 national team for 1999 World Youth Championship. At this tournament, he played full time in all 7 matches and Japan won the 2nd place. He played as center back on three backs defense with Shigeki Tsujimoto and Koji Nakata.

== Career statistics ==
Appearances and goals by club, season and competition
Club	Season	League			Emperor's Cup		J.League Cup		Total	
Club	Season	Division	Apps	Goals	Apps	Goals	Apps	Goals	Apps	Goals
Yokohama Flügels	1998	J1 League	0	0	0	0	1	0	1	0
Kyoto Purple Sanga	1999	J1 League	22	0	2	0	2	0	26	0
Kyoto Purple Sanga	2000	J1 League	21	0	1	0	4	0	26	0
Kyoto Purple Sanga	2001	J2 League	42	0	3	0	2	0	47	0
Kyoto Purple Sanga	2002	J1 League	20	0	5	0	1	0	26	0
Kyoto Purple Sanga	2003	J1 League	23	0	1	0	3	0	27	0
Kyoto Purple Sanga	2004	J2 League	35	2	2	0	—		37	2
Kyoto Purple Sanga	2005	J2 League	17	1	1	0	—		18	1
Gamba Osaka	2006	J1 League	0	0	0	0	0	0	0	0
Kyoto Purple Sanga	2006	J1 League	19	2	0	0	0	0	19	2
Kyoto Sanga FC	2007	J2 League	19	0	1	0	—		20	0
Kyoto Sanga FC	2008	J1 League	24	0	2	0	5	0	31	0
Kyoto Sanga FC	2009	J1 League	0	0	0	0	2	0	2	0
Career total			242	5	23	0	20	0	280	5

== Honors and awards ==
- FIFA World Youth Championship runner-up: 1999
