= Satoru Suzuki =

Japanese footballer

Satoru Suzuki 鈴木 悟
Personal information
- Full name: Satoru Suzuki
- Date of birth: July 19, 1975 (age 51)
- Place of birth: Shizuoka, Japan
- Height: 1.81 m (5 ft 11 1/2 in)
- Position: Defender

Youth career
- 1991–1993: Shimizu Commercial High School
- 1994–1997: Juntendo University

Senior career*
Years	Team	Apps	(Gls)
1998–2003	Cerezo Osaka	175	(6)
2004–2006	Kyoto Purple Sanga	50	(3)
Total		225	(9)
Medal record
Cerezo Osaka
Runner-up	Emperor's Cup	2001
Runner-up	Emperor's Cup	2003
- * Club domestic league appearances and goals

Satoru Suzuki (鈴木 悟, Suzuki Satoru; born July 19, 1975) is a former Japanese football player.

== Playing career ==
Suzuki was born in Shizuoka Prefecture on July 19, 1975. After graduating from Juntendo University, he joined J1 League club Cerezo Osaka in 1998. He played many matches as left side back from first season. In 2000s, he played many matches as center back and the club won the 2nd place 2001 Emperor's Cup. However the club results were bad in league competition in 2001 and was relegated to J2 League from 2002. The club returned to J1 in a year and eon the 2nd place 2003 Emperor's Cup. In 2004, he moved to J2 club Kyoto Purple Sanga. He played many matches as center back in 2004. Although his opportunity to play decreased in 2005, the club won the champions and was promoted to J1 from 2006. In 2006, he played as center back in full time in 5 matches from opening game. However he could not play for injury from the 6th match. Although he came back as substitute in October, he could not play at all in the match and retired at the end of the 2006 season.

== Career statistics ==
Appearances and goals by club, season and competition
Club	Season	League			Emperor's Cup		J.League Cup		Total	
Club	Season	Division	Apps	Goals	Apps	Goals	Apps	Goals	Apps	Goals
Cerezo Osaka	1998	J1 League	33	3	1	0	4	0	38	3
Cerezo Osaka	1999	J1 League	21	0	2	0	4	0	27	0
Cerezo Osaka	2000	J1 League	30	1	2	0	4	0	36	1
Cerezo Osaka	2001	J1 League	23	0	5	0	1	0	29	0
Cerezo Osaka	2002	J2 League	43	2	4	0	—		47	2
Cerezo Osaka	2003	J1 League	25	0	5	0	4	0	34	0
Kyoto Purple Sanga	2004	J2 League	27	1	1	0	—		28	1
Kyoto Purple Sanga	2005	J2 League	18	2	1	0	—		19	2
Kyoto Purple Sanga	2006	J1 League	5	0	0	0	0	0	5	0
Career total			225	9	21	0	17	0	263	9
