= Kenji Miyazaki =

Japanese footballer

Kenji Miyazaki 宮崎 健治
Personal information
- Full name: Kenji Miyazaki
- Date of birth: June 24, 1977 (age 49)
- Place of birth: Fukuoka, Japan
- Height: 1.73 m (5 ft 8 in)
- Position: Midfielder

Youth career
- 1993–1995: Kunimi High School
- 1996–1999: Kwansei Gakuin University

Senior career*
Years	Team	Apps	(Gls)
2000–2001	Kyoto Purple Sanga	22	(0)
Total		22	(0)
- * Club domestic league appearances and goals

Kenji Miyazaki (宮崎 健治, Miyazaki Kenji; born June 24, 1977) is a former Japanese football player.

== Playing career ==
Miyazaki was born in Fukuoka Prefecture on June 24, 1977. After graduating from Kwansei Gakuin University, he joined J1 League club Kyoto Purple Sanga in 2000. He became a regular player as right side midfielder. However he could hardly play in the match from summer 2000 and the club was relegated to J2 League from 2001. He could hardly play in the match in 2001 and retired end of 2001 season.

== Career statistics ==
Appearances and goals by club, season and competition
Club	Season	League			Emperor's Cup		J.League Cup		Total	
Club	Season	Division	Apps	Goals	Apps	Goals	Apps	Goals	Apps	Goals
Kyoto Purple Sanga	2000	J1 League	18	0	0	0	0	0	18	0
Kyoto Purple Sanga	2001	J2 League	4	0	0	0	0	0	4	0
Career total			22	0	0	0	0	0	22	0
