= Edinho Baiano =

Brazilian footballer (born 1967)

Personal information
- Full name: Édson Manoel do Nascimento
- Date of birth: 27 July 1967 (age 59)
- Place of birth: Caruaru, Brazil
- Height: 1.80 m (5 ft 11 in)
- Position: Defender

Senior career*
| Years | Team | Apps | (Gls) |
| 1988–1990 | Vitória | | |
| 1991 | Joinville | | |
| 1992–1993 | Palmeiras | | |
| 1994–1997 | Paraná | | |
| 1998 | Atlético Paranaense | | |
| 1999 | Vitória | | |
| 2000 | Kyoto Purple Sanga | | |
| 2001–2003 | Coritiba | | |
| 2004 | Avaí | | |
| 2004 | Londrina | | |
| 2005 | Portuguesa Santista | | |
- * Club domestic league appearances and goals

Édson Manoel do Nascimento (born 27 July 1967), better known as Edinho Baiano, is a former Brazilian footballer.

== Club statistics ==
| Club performance | | | League | | Cup | | League Cup | | Total | |
| Season | Club | League | Apps | Goals | Apps | Goals | Apps | Goals | Apps | Goals |
| Japan | | | League | | Emperor's Cup | | J.League Cup | | Total | |
|---|---|---|---|---|---|---|---|---|---|---|
| 2000 | Kyoto Purple Sanga | J1 League | 24 | 0 | 1 | 0 | 6 | 1 | 31 | 1 |
| Total | | | 24 | 0 | 1 | 0 | 6 | 1 | 31 | 1 |
