= Paulo Magino =

Brazilian footballer

Personal information
- Full name: Paulo Magino de Souza
- Date of birth: June 23, 1979 (age 47)
- Place of birth: Brazil
- Height: 1.72 m (5 ft 7 1/2 in)
- Position: Forward

Senior career*
| Years | Team | Apps | (Gls) |
| 1999 | Kyoto Purple Sanga | 16 | (6) |
- * Club domestic league appearances and goals

Paulo Magino Magino de Souza (born June 23, 1979) is a former Brazilian football player.

== Club statistics ==
| Club performance | | | League | | Cup | | League Cup | | Total | |
| Season | Club | League | Apps | Goals | Apps | Goals | Apps | Goals | Apps | Goals |
| Japan | | | League | | Emperor's Cup | | J.League Cup | | Total | |
|---|---|---|---|---|---|---|---|---|---|---|
| 1999 | Kyoto Purple Sanga | J1 League | 16 | 6 | 2 | 1 | 2 | 1 | 20 | 8 |
| Total | | | 16 | 6 | 2 | 1 | 2 | 1 | 20 | 8 |
