= Kentaro Yoshida =

Japanese footballer

Kentaro Yoshida 吉田 賢太郎
Personal information
- Full name: Kentaro Yoshida
- Date of birth: October 5, 1980 (age 46)
- Place of birth: Saga, Japan
- Height: 1.78 m (5 ft 10 in)
- Position: Forward

Youth career
- 1996–1998: Tokai University Daigo High School

Senior career*
Years	Team	Apps	(Gls)
1999–2001	Kyoto Purple Sanga	7	(1)
2002–2004	Mito HollyHock	59	(5)
2005–2007	Tochigi SC	66	(27)
2008	Matsumoto Yamaga FC	10	(2)
Total		142	(35)
- * Club domestic league appearances and goals

Kentaro Yoshida (吉田 賢太郎, Yoshida Kentarō; born October 5, 1980) is a former Japanese football player. He is the current assistant manager of Vegalta Sendai.

== Playing career ==
Yoshida was born in Saga Prefecture on October 5, 1980. After graduating from high school, he joined J1 League club Kyoto Purple Sanga in 1999. Although he played several matches as forward from 2000, he could not play many matches. In 2002, he moved to J2 League club Mito HollyHock. He played many matches in 2002. However his opportunity to play decreased from 2003. In 2005, he moved to Japan Football League club Tochigi SC. He played as regular player and scored many goals until 2006. However his opportunity to play decreased in 2007. In 2008, he moved to Regional Leagues club Matsumoto Yamaga FC. He retired end of 2008 season.

== Career statistics ==
Appearances and goals by club, season and competition
Club	Season	League			Emperor's Cup		J.League Cup		Total	
Club	Season	Division	Apps	Goals	Apps	Goals	Apps	Goals	Apps	Goals
Kyoto Purple Sanga	1999	J1 League	0	0	0	0	0	0	0	0
Kyoto Purple Sanga	2000	J1 League	5	1	0	0	2	0	7	1
Kyoto Purple Sanga	2001	J2 League	2	0	1	0	0	0	3	0
Mito HollyHock	2002	J2 League	31	5	1	1	-		32	6
Mito HollyHock	2003	J2 League	13	0	2	0	-		15	0
Mito HollyHock	2004	J2 League	15	0	2	0	-		17	0
Tochigi SC	2005	Football League	28	13	0	0	-		28	13
Tochigi SC	2006	Football League	29	12	4	2	-		33	14
Tochigi SC	2007	Football League	9	2	0	0	-		9	2
Matsumoto Yamaga FC	2008	Regional Leagues	10	2	2	0	-		12	2
Career total			142	35	12	2	2	0	156	37
