= Takatoshi Matsumoto =

Japanese footballer

Takatoshi Matsumoto 松本 昂聡
Personal information
- Full name: Takatoshi Matsumoto
- Date of birth: September 5, 1983 (age 43)
- Place of birth: Minato, Tokyo, Japan
- Height: 1.83 m (6 ft 0 in)
- Position: Defender

Youth career
- 1999–2001: Kyoto Purple Sanga

Senior career*
Years	Team	Apps	(Gls)
2002–2003	Kyoto Purple Sanga	5	(0)
2004	FC Tokyo	0	(0)
2005	Vissel Kobe	0	(0)
2006–2008	Shonan Bellmare	50	(1)
2008	Tokushima Vortis	11	(0)
2009	MIO Biwako Kusatsu	0	(0)
Total		66	(1)
Medal record
Kyoto Purple Sanga
Winner	Emperor's Cup	2002
FC Tokyo
Winner	J.League Cup	2004
- * Club domestic league appearances and goals

Takatoshi Matsumoto (松本 昂聡, Matsumoto Takatoshi; born September 5, 1983) is a former Japanese football player.

== Playing career ==
Matsumoto was born in Minato, Tokyo on September 5, 1983. He joined J1 League club Kyoto Purple Sanga from youth team in 2002. He debuted in October and played several matches as center back in 2002 season. However he could only play 1 match in 2003 and Sanga was relegated to J2 League end of 2003 season. He moved to J1 club FC Tokyo (2004) and Vissel Kobe (2005). However he could not play at all in the match in both clubs. In 2006, he moved to J2 club Shonan Bellmare. He became a regular player in 2006. However his opportunity to play decreased from 2007 and he could hardly play in the match in 2008. In June 2008, he moved to Tokushima Vortis and became a regular player soon. However he could not play at all in the match for injury from September and left the club end of 2008 season. In September 2009, he joined Japan Football League club MIO Biwako Kusatsu. However he could not play at all in the match and retired end of 2009 season.

== Club statistics ==
Club performance			League		Cup		League Cup		Total	
Season	Club	League	Apps	Goals	Apps	Goals	Apps	Goals	Apps	Goals
Japan			League		Emperor's Cup		J.League Cup		Total	
2002	Kyoto Purple Sanga	J1 League	4	0	0	0	0	0	4	0
2003	Kyoto Purple Sanga	J1 League	1	0	0	0	0	0	1	0
2004	FC Tokyo	J1 League	0	0	0	0	0	0	0	0
2005	Vissel Kobe	J1 League	0	0	0	0	0	0	0	0
2006	Shonan Bellmare	J2 League	31	1	2	0	-		33	1
2007	Shonan Bellmare	J2 League	17	0	0	0	-		17	0
2008	Shonan Bellmare	J2 League	2	0	0	0	-		2	0
2008	Tokushima Vortis	J2 League	11	0	0	0	-		11	0
2009	MIO Biwako Kusatsu	Football League	0	0	-		-		0	0
Total			66	1	2	0	0	0	68	1
