= Fabrício (footballer, born 1982) =

Brazilian footballer

Personal information
- Full name: Fabrício André Pires
- Date of birth: January 29, 1982 (age 44)
- Place of birth: Brazil
- Height: 1.62 m (5 ft 4 in)
- Position: Midfielder

Senior career*
Years	Team	Apps	(Gls)
2000	Kyoto Purple Sanga	1	(0)
- * Club domestic league appearances and goals

Fabrício André Pires (born January 29, 1982) is a former Brazilian football player.

== Career statistics ==
Appearances and goals by club, season and competition
Club	Season	League			Emperor's Cup		J.League Cup		Total	
Club	Season	Division	Apps	Goals	Apps	Goals	Apps	Goals	Apps	Goals
Kyoto Purple Sanga	2000	J1 League	1	0	0	0	0	0	1	0
Career total			1	0	0	0	0	0	1	0
