= Makoto Atsuta =

Japanese footballer

Makoto Atsuta 熱田 眞
Personal information
- Date of birth: September 16, 1976 (age 50)
- Place of birth: Machida, Tokyo, Japan
- Height: 1.74 m (5 ft 8 1/2 in)
- Position: Midfielder

Youth career
- 1992–1994: Teikyo High School
- 1995–1998: Kokushikan University

Senior career*
Years	Team	Apps	(Gls)
1999–2004	Kyoto Purple Sanga	125	(14)
2003	→ Albirex Niigata (loan)	1	(0)
Total		126	(14)
Medal record
Kyoto Purple Sanga
Winner	Emperor's Cup	2002
- * Club domestic league appearances and goals

Makoto Atsuta (熱田 眞, Atsuta Makoto; born September 16, 1976) is a former Japanese football player.

== Playing career ==
Atsuta was born in Machida on September 16, 1976. After graduating from Kokushikan University, he joined J1 League club Kyoto Purple Sanga in 1999. He played many matches as offensive midfielder from first season. However the club was relegated to J2 League from 2001. In 2001, he became a regular player and the club won the champions and was promoted to J1 in a year. In 2002, his opportunity to play decreased and he played many matches as substitute. The club won the champions 2002 Emperor's Cup first major title in the club history. In August 2003, he moved to J2 club Albirex Niigata on loan. However he could hardly play in the match. In 2004, he returned to Kyoto Purple Sanga. Although he played many matches as regular player, he retired end of 2004 season.

== Club statistics ==
Club performance			League		Cup		League Cup		Total	
Season	Club	League	Apps	Goals	Apps	Goals	Apps	Goals	Apps	Goals
Japan			League		Emperor's Cup		J.League Cup		Total	
1998	Kokushikan University	Football League	21	11	2	0	-		23	11
1999	Kyoto Purple Sanga	J1 League	14	1	0	0	2	1	16	2
2000	Kyoto Purple Sanga	J1 League	18	5	0	0	6	0	24	5
2001	Kyoto Purple Sanga	J2 League	37	3	4	0	1	0	42	3
2002	Kyoto Purple Sanga	J1 League	18	0	5	0	1	0	24	0
2003	Kyoto Purple Sanga	J1 League	4	0	0	0	1	0	5	0
2003	Albirex Niigata	J2 League	1	0	2	0	-		3	0
2004	Kyoto Purple Sanga	J2 League	34	5	2	1	-		36	6
Career total			147	25	15	1	11	1	173	27
