= 2006 Kyoto Purple Sanga season =

Kyoto Purple Sanga
2006 season
- Manager: Koichi Hashiratani; Naohiko Minobe
- Stadium: Nishikyogoku Athletic Stadium
- J. League 1: 18th
- Emperor's Cup: 4th Round
- J. League Cup: GL-A 4th
- Top goalscorer: Paulinho (14)
Home colours	Away colours

2006 Kyoto Purple Sanga season

== Competitions ==
Competitions	Position
J. League 1	18th / 18 clubs
Emperor's Cup	4th Round
J. League Cup	GL-A 4th / 4 clubs

== Domestic results ==
=== J. League 1 ===
Match	Date	Venue	Opponents	Score
1	2006..			-
2	2006..			-
3	2006..			-
4	2006..			-
5	2006..			-
6	2006..			-
7	2006..			-
8	2006..			-
9	2006..			-
10	2006..			-
11	2006..			-
12	2006..			-
13	2006..			-
14	2006..			-
15	2006..			-
16	2006..			-
17	2006..			-
18	2006..			-
19	2006..			-
20	2006..			-
21	2006..			-
22	2006..			-
23	2006..			-
24	2006..			-
25	2006..			-
26	2006..			-
27	2006..			-
28	2006..			-
29	2006..			-
30	2006..			-
31	2006..			-
32	2006..			-
33	2006..			-
34	2006..			-

=== Emperor's Cup ===
Match	Date	Venue	Opponents	Score
4th Round	2006..			-

=== J. League Cup ===
Match	Date	Venue	Opponents	Score
GL-B-1	2006..			-
GL-B-2	2006..			-
GL-B-3	2006..			-
GL-B-4	2006..			-
GL-B-5	2006..			-
GL-B-6	2006..			-

== Player statistics ==
No.	Pos.	Player	D.o.B. (Age)	Height / Weight	J. League 1		Emperor's Cup		J. League Cup		Total	
No.	Pos.	Player	D.o.B. (Age)	Height / Weight	Apps	Goals	Apps	Goals	Apps	Goals	Apps	Goals
1	GK	Naohito Hirai	July 16, 1978 (aged 27)	cm / kg	18	0						
2	DF	Satoru Suzuki	July 19, 1975 (aged 30)	cm / kg	5	0						
3	DF	Ricardo	February 23, 1977 (aged 29)	cm / kg	10	0						
3	MF	Pinheiro	August 22, 1976 (aged 29)	cm / kg	5	0						
4	DF	Kazuhiro Suzuki	November 16, 1976 (aged 29)	cm / kg	3	0						
5	DF	Masakazu Washida	November 15, 1978 (aged 27)	cm / kg	5	0						
6	DF	Takuya Mikami	February 13, 1980 (aged 26)	cm / kg	11	0						
7	DF	Arata Kodama	October 8, 1982 (aged 23)	cm / kg	31	0						
8	MF	Atsushi Mio	January 26, 1983 (aged 23)	cm / kg	20	1						
9	FW	Alemão	April 10, 1984 (aged 21)	cm / kg	10	2						
9	FW	André	December 14, 1978 (aged 27)	cm / kg	11	3						
10	FW	Paulinho	July 16, 1982 (aged 23)	cm / kg	31	14						
11	MF	Daisuke Hoshi	December 10, 1980 (aged 25)	cm / kg	19	1						
13	MF	Hideaki Ikematsu	January 10, 1986 (aged 20)	cm / kg	0	0						
14	MF	Daisuke Nakaharai	May 22, 1977 (aged 28)	cm / kg	27	3						
15	MF	Hiroki Nakayama	December 13, 1985 (aged 20)	cm / kg	11	2						
16	MF	Daisuke Saito	August 29, 1980 (aged 25)	cm / kg	33	1						
17	MF	Toshiya Ishii	January 19, 1978 (aged 28)	cm / kg	17	0						
18	MF	Kenichiro Meta	July 2, 1982 (aged 23)	cm / kg	19	0						
19	DF	Kentoku Noborio	November 30, 1983 (aged 22)	cm / kg	20	0						
20	FW	Takenori Hayashi	October 14, 1980 (aged 25)	cm / kg	23	2						
21	GK	Satoshi Hashida	December 20, 1981 (aged 24)	cm / kg	0	0						
22	MF	Daigo Watanabe	December 3, 1984 (aged 21)	cm / kg	18	0						
23	DF	Yuki Okubo	April 17, 1984 (aged 21)	cm / kg	17	0						
24	FW	Noboru Kohara	July 22, 1983 (aged 22)	cm / kg	6	0						
25	GK	Hideaki Ueno	May 31, 1981 (aged 24)	cm / kg	0	0						
26	GK	Koji Nishimura	July 7, 1984 (aged 21)	cm / kg	16	0						
27	MF	Daishi Kato	July 26, 1983 (aged 22)	cm / kg	21	1						
29	DF	Masataka Tamura	January 12, 1988 (aged 18)	cm / kg	0	0						
30	FW	Masatoshi Matsuda	September 4, 1980 (aged 25)	cm / kg	14	2						
31	FW	Yutaka Tahara	April 27, 1982 (aged 23)	cm / kg	16	1						
32	DF	Kazuki Teshima	June 7, 1979 (aged 26)	cm / kg	19	2						
33	DF	Makoto Kakuda	July 10, 1983 (aged 22)	cm / kg	18	1						
34	FW	Diego	March 20, 1988 (aged 17)	cm / kg	0	0						

== Other pages ==
- (in Japanese) J. League official site
