= 1999 Kyoto Purple Sanga season =

Kyoto Purple Sanga
1999 season
- Manager: Hidehiko Shimizu; Bunji Kimura; Shu Kamo
- Stadium: Nishikyogoku Athletic Stadium
- J.League 1: 12th
- Emperor's Cup: 4th Round
- J.League Cup: 2nd Round
- Top goalscorer: Silas (6); Paulo Magino (6)
Home colours	Away colours

1999 Kyoto Purple Sanga season

== Competitions ==
Competitions	Position
J.League 1	12th / 16 clubs
Emperor's Cup	4th Round
J.League Cup	2nd Round

== Domestic results ==
=== J.League 1 ===
6 March 1999 1-1	Kashiwa Reysol	1-0	Kyoto Purple Sanga	Hitachi Kashiwa Soccer Stadium
JST (UTC+09)

13 March 1999 1-2	Kyoto Purple Sanga	1-3	Yokohama F. Marinos	Nishikyogoku Athletic Stadium
JST (UTC+09)

20 March 1999 1-3	Shimizu S-Pulse	1-0	Kyoto Purple Sanga	Nihondaira Sports Stadium
JST (UTC+09)

27 March 1999 1-4	Kyoto Purple Sanga	0-1	Cerezo Osaka	Nishikyogoku Athletic Stadium
JST (UTC+09)

3 April 1999 1-5	Júbilo Iwata	2-1	Kyoto Purple Sanga	Júbilo Iwata Stadium
JST (UTC+09)

10 April 1999 1-6	Kyoto Purple Sanga	1-2 (GG) (a.e.t.)	Kashima Antlers	Nishikyogoku Athletic Stadium
JST (UTC+09)

17 April 1999 1-7	Urawa Red Diamonds	0-1	Kyoto Purple Sanga	Urawa Komaba Stadium
JST (UTC+09)

24 April 1999 1-8	Kyoto Purple Sanga	1-2	Nagoya Grampus Eight	Nishikyogoku Athletic Stadium
JST (UTC+09)

28 April 1999 1-9	Gamba Osaka	1-2	Kyoto Purple Sanga	Osaka Expo '70 Stadium
JST (UTC+09)

1 May 1999 1-10	Kyoto Purple Sanga	2-3 (GG) (a.e.t.)	JEF United Ichihara	Nishikyogoku Athletic Stadium
JST (UTC+09)

5 May 1999 1-11	Vissel Kobe	3-2	Kyoto Purple Sanga	Kobe Universiade Memorial Stadium
JST (UTC+09)

8 May 1999 1-12	Kyoto Purple Sanga	0-4	Sanfrecce Hiroshima	Tottori Soccer Stadium
JST (UTC+09)

15 May 1999 1-13	Verdy Kawasaki	0-3	Kyoto Purple Sanga	Todoroki Athletics Stadium
JST (UTC+09)

22 May 1999 1-14	Kyoto Purple Sanga	4-3	Bellmare Hiratsuka	Nishikyogoku Athletic Stadium
JST (UTC+09)

29 May 1999 1-15	Avispa Fukuoka	2-0	Kyoto Purple Sanga	Hakatanomori Football Stadium
JST (UTC+09)

7 August 1999 2-1	Kyoto Purple Sanga	2-1	Urawa Red Diamonds	Nishikyogoku Athletic Stadium
JST (UTC+09)

14 August 1999 2-2	Nagoya Grampus Eight	0-3	Kyoto Purple Sanga	Mizuho Athletic Stadium
JST (UTC+09)

18 August 1999 2-3	Kyoto Purple Sanga	1-0	Gamba Osaka	Nishikyogoku Athletic Stadium
JST (UTC+09)

21 August 1999 2-4	JEF United Ichihara	2-1 (GG) (a.e.t.)	Kyoto Purple Sanga	Ichihara Seaside Stadium
JST (UTC+09)

28 August 1999 2-5	Kyoto Purple Sanga	3-1	Vissel Kobe	Nishikyogoku Athletic Stadium
JST (UTC+09)

4 September 1999 2-6	Sanfrecce Hiroshima	2-1	Kyoto Purple Sanga	Hiroshima Stadium
JST (UTC+09)

11 September 1999 2-7	Kyoto Purple Sanga	1-0 (GG) (a.e.t.)	Verdy Kawasaki	Kagoshima Kamoike Stadium
JST (UTC+09)

15 September 1999 2-8	Bellmare Hiratsuka	0-1	Kyoto Purple Sanga	Hiratsuka Athletics Stadium
JST (UTC+09)

18 September 1999 2-9	Kyoto Purple Sanga	1-5	Avispa Fukuoka	Nishikyogoku Athletic Stadium
JST (UTC+09)

22 September 1999 2-10	Kyoto Purple Sanga	1-2 (GG) (a.e.t.)	Kashiwa Reysol	Nishikyogoku Athletic Stadium
JST (UTC+09)

30 October 1999 2-11	Kyoto Purple Sanga	0-2	Shimizu S-Pulse	Nishikyogoku Athletic Stadium
JST (UTC+09)

17 November 1999 2-12	Yokohama F. Marinos	2-0	Kyoto Purple Sanga	International Stadium Yokohama
JST (UTC+09)

20 November 1999 2-13	Kashima Antlers	5-0	Kyoto Purple Sanga	Kashima Soccer Stadium
JST (UTC+09)

23 November 1999 2-14	Kyoto Purple Sanga	2-6	Júbilo Iwata	Nishikyogoku Athletic Stadium
JST (UTC+09)

27 November 1999 2-15	Cerezo Osaka	2-3 (GG) (a.e.t.)	Kyoto Purple Sanga	Osaka Nagai Second Stadium
JST (UTC+09)

=== Emperor's Cup ===
1st Round	bye

2nd Round	bye

12 December 1999 3rd Round	Kyoto Purple Sanga	1-0	Ōita Trinita	Nishikyogoku Athletic Stadium
JST (UTC+09)

19 December 1999 4th Round	Shimizu S-Pulse	2-2 (GG) (a.e.t.) (4-2 p)	Kyoto Purple Sanga	Nagasaki Athletic Stadium
JST (UTC+09)

=== J.League Cup ===
7 April 1999 1st Round-1	Montedio Yamagata	0-5	Kyoto Purple Sanga	Yamagata Park Stadium
JST (UTC+09)

14 April 1999 1st Round-2	Kyoto Purple Sanga	4-1 (9-1 agg.)	Montedio Yamagata	Nishikyogoku Athletic Stadium
JST (UTC+09)

12 June 1999 2nd Round-1	Kyoto Purple Sanga	1-0	Shimizu S-Pulse	Nishikyogoku Athletic Stadium
JST (UTC+09)

19 June 1999 2nd Round-2	Shimizu S-Pulse	2-0 (GG) (a.e.t.) (2-1 agg.)	Kyoto Purple Sanga	Nihondaira Sports Stadium
JST (UTC+09)

== Player statistics ==
No.	Pos.	Nat.	Player	D.o.B. (Age)	Height / Weight	J.League 1		Emperor's Cup		J.League Cup		Total	
No.	Pos.	Nat.	Player	D.o.B. (Age)	Height / Weight	Apps	Goals	Apps	Goals	Apps	Goals	Apps	Goals
1	GK	(Japan)	Shigetatsu Matsunaga	August 12, 1962 (aged 36)	cm / kg	30	0						
2	DF	(Japan)	Hiroshi Noguchi	February 25, 1972 (aged 27)	cm / kg	22	1						
3	DF	(Japan)	Eiji Gaya	February 8, 1969 (aged 30)	cm / kg	0	0						
4	DF	(Japan)	Naoto Otake	October 18, 1968 (aged 30)	cm / kg	27	0						
5	DF	(Brazil)	Sidiclei	May 13, 1972 (aged 26)	cm / kg	29	4						
6	DF	(Japan)	Jin Sato	September 27, 1974 (aged 24)	cm / kg	20	1						
7	MF	(Japan)	Shigeru Morioka	August 12, 1973 (aged 25)	cm / kg	15	2						
8	MF	(Japan)	Fumitake Miura	August 12, 1970 (aged 28)	cm / kg	23	4						
9	FW	(Japan)	Hisashi Kurosaki	May 8, 1968 (aged 30)	cm / kg	14	3						
10	MF	(Brazil)	Paulo Silas	August 27, 1965 (aged 33)	cm / kg	26	6						
11	FW	(Japan)	Shinji Fujiyoshi	April 3, 1970 (aged 28)	cm / kg	17	1						
12	GK	(Japan)	Hiroyuki Nitao	November 27, 1973 (aged 25)	cm / kg	0	0						
13	DF	(Japan)	Kenichiro Tokura	May 31, 1971 (aged 27)	cm / kg	10	0						
13	MF	(Japan)	Suguru Ito	September 7, 1975 (aged 23)	cm / kg	0	0						
14	MF	(Japan)	Yasuhito Endō	January 28, 1980 (aged 19)	cm / kg	24	4						
15	FW	(Brazil)	Paulo Magino	June 23, 1979 (aged 19)	cm / kg	16	6						
16	MF	(Japan)	Masaya Honda	November 20, 1973 (aged 25)	cm / kg	0	0						
17	DF	(Japan)	Kazuki Teshima	June 7, 1979 (aged 19)	cm / kg	22	0						
18	FW	(Japan)	Hideo Ōshima	March 7, 1980 (aged 18)	cm / kg	4	0						
19	DF	(Japan)	Kensaku Omori	November 21, 1975 (aged 23)	cm / kg	3	0						
20	DF	(Japan)	Shigeki Tsujimoto	June 23, 1979 (aged 19)	cm / kg	9	0						
21	GK	(Japan)	Masahiko Nakagawa	August 26, 1969 (aged 29)	cm / kg	0	0						
22	FW	(Japan)	Shinya Mitsuoka	April 22, 1976 (aged 22)	cm / kg	2	0						
23	DF	(Japan)	Keiju Karashima	June 24, 1971 (aged 27)	cm / kg	0	0						
24	MF	(Japan)	Makoto Atsuta	September 16, 1976 (aged 22)	cm / kg	14	1						
25	MF	(Japan)	Daisuke Saito	August 29, 1980 (aged 18)	cm / kg	0	0						
26	DF	(Japan)	Masato Yamasaki	April 7, 1980 (aged 18)	cm / kg	0	0						
27	MF	(Japan)	Takao Ishima	June 21, 1980 (aged 18)	cm / kg	0	0						
28	GK	(Japan)	Naohito Hirai	July 16, 1978 (aged 20)	cm / kg	0	0						
29	FW	(Japan)	Hiroyasu Kawakatsu	September 19, 1975 (aged 23)	cm / kg	11	0						
30	DF	(Japan)	Akihiro Minami	December 10, 1979 (aged 19)	cm / kg	0	0						
31	MF	(South Korea)	Park Kang-Jo	January 24, 1980 (aged 19)	cm / kg	1	0						
32	FW	(Japan)	Kentaro Yoshida	October 5, 1980 (aged 18)	cm / kg	0	0						
33	DF	(Japan)	Takehito Suzuki	June 11, 1971 (aged 27)	cm / kg	29	0						
34	MF	(Japan)	Shinya Tomita	May 8, 1980 (aged 18)	cm / kg	1	0						
35	MF	(Japan)	Hiroshi Otsuki	April 23, 1980 (aged 18)	cm / kg	10	0						
36	FW	(Japan)	Kazuyoshi Miura	February 26, 1967 (aged 32)	cm / kg	11	4						
37	FW	(Brazil)	Nascimento	October 21, 1979 (aged 19)	cm / kg	0	0						

== Other pages ==
- (in Japanese) J.League official site
