= Shinya Tomita =

Japanese footballer

Shinya Tomita 冨田 晋矢
Personal information
- Full name: Shinya Tomita
- Date of birth: May 8, 1980 (age 46)
- Place of birth: Kyoto, Japan
- Height: 1.75 m (5 ft 9 in)
- Position: Midfielder

Youth career
- 1996–1998: Kyoto Purple Sanga

Senior career*
Years	Team	Apps	(Gls)
1999–2005	Kyoto Purple Sanga	92	(5)
2006	Arte Takasaki	17	(2)
2007–2008	FC Mi-O Biwako Kusatsu		
Total		109	(7)
Medal record
Kyoto Purple Sanga
Winner	Emperor's Cup	2002
- * Club domestic league appearances and goals

Shinya Tomita (冨田 晋矢, Tomita Shinya; born May 8, 1980) is a former Japanese football player.

== Playing career ==
Tomita was born in Kyoto on May 8, 1980. He joined J1 League club Kyoto Purple Sanga from youth team in 1999. On August 14, he debuted as forward against Nagoya Grampus Eight. His opportunity to play gradually decreased from 2000. He played many matches as offensive midfielder from 2001 and the club won the champions 2002 Emperor's Cup first major title in the club history. However he could hardly play in the match behind new member Daisuke Hoshi and Daishi Kato in 2005. In 2006, he moved to Japan Football League (JFL) club Arte Takasaki and played in 1 season. In June 2007, he moved to Regional Leagues club FC Mi-O Biwako Kusatsu. The club was promoted to JFL from 2008. He retired end of 2008 season.

== Career statistics ==
Appearances and goals by club, season and competition
Club	Season	League			Emperor's Cup		J.League Cup		Total	
Club	Season	Division	Apps	Goals	Apps	Goals	Apps	Goals	Apps	Goals
Kyoto Purple Sanga	1999	J1 League	1	0	0	0	0	0	1	0
Kyoto Purple Sanga	2000	J1 League	4	0	1	0	2	0	7	0
Kyoto Purple Sanga	2001	J2 League	11	0	4	1	2	0	17	1
Kyoto Purple Sanga	2002	J1 League	20	3	5	0	4	1	29	4
Kyoto Purple Sanga	2003	J1 League	22	1	1	0	3	0	26	1
Kyoto Purple Sanga	2004	J2 League	31	1	1	0	—		32	1
Kyoto Purple Sanga	2005	J2 League	3	0	1	2	—		4	2
Arte Takasaki	2006	Football League	17	2	—		—		17	2
FC Mi-O Biwako Kusatsu	2007	Regional Leagues			2	1	—			
FC Mi-O Biwako Kusatsu	2008	Football League	20	1	—		—		20	1
Career total			129	8	15	4	11	1	155	13
