= Daisuke Matsui =

Japanese footballer (born 1981)

Daisuke Matsui 松井 大輔
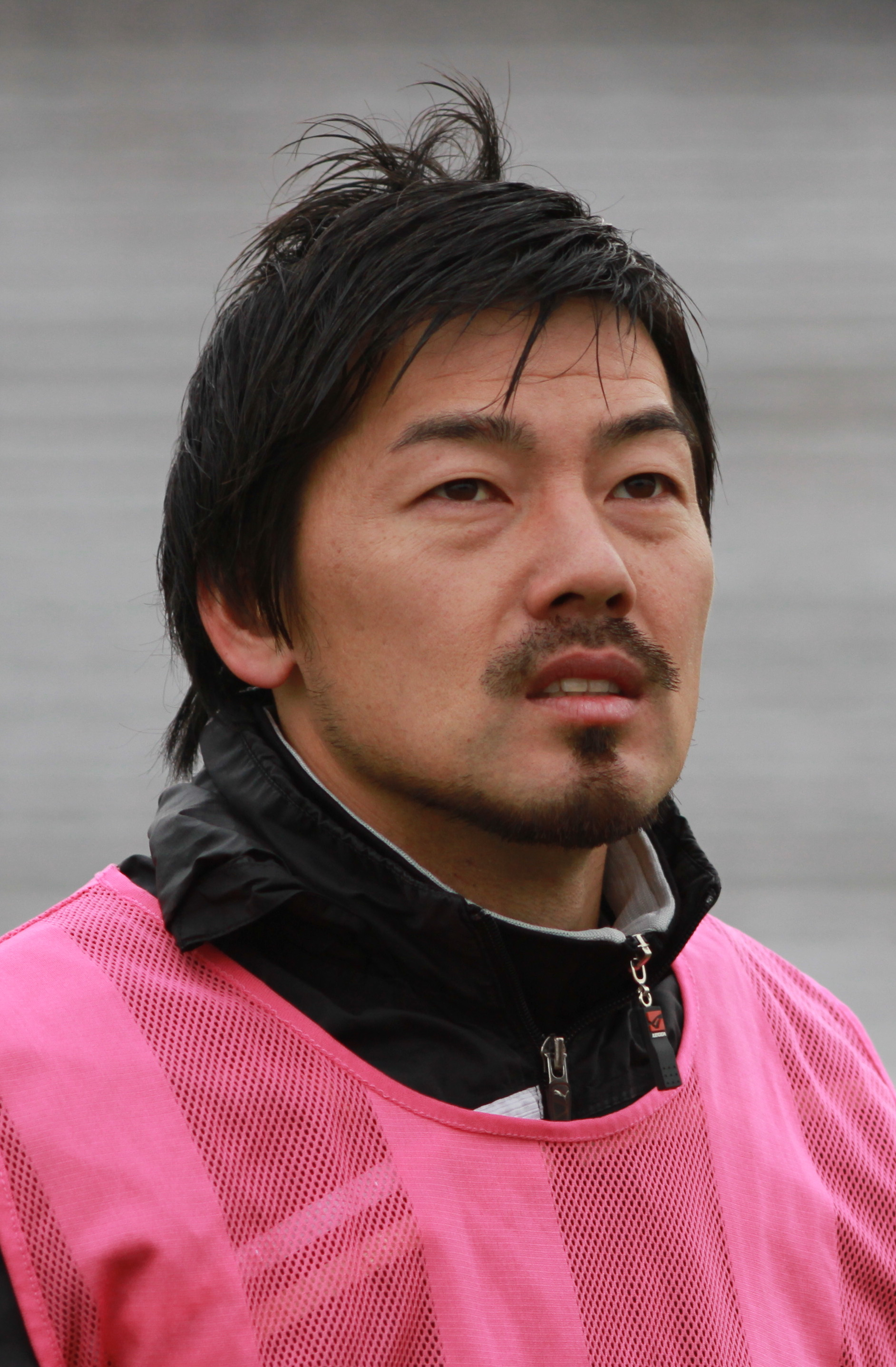
- Matsui in 2012

Personal information
- Date of birth: 11 May 1981 (age 45)
- Place of birth: Kyoto, Kyoto, Japan
- Height: 1.75 m (5 ft 9 in)
- Position: Midfielder

Youth career
- 1997–1999: Kagoshima Jitsugyo High School

Senior career*
Years	Team	Apps	(Gls)
2000–2004	Kyoto Purple Sanga	126	(16)
2004–2008	Le Mans	119	(15)
2008–2009	Saint-Étienne	22	(1)
2009–2011	Grenoble	45	(5)
2010	→ Tom Tomsk (loan)	7	(0)
2011–2012	Dijon	3	(0)
2012–2013	Slavia Sofia	11	(0)
2013	Lechia Gdańsk	16	(4)
2014–2017	Júbilo Iwata	85	(9)
2017	Odra Opole	4	(0)
2018–2020	Yokohama FC	36	(2)
2021	Saigon FC	7	(0)
2022–2023	YSCC Yokohama	26	(3)
Total		458	(51)

International career
2002–2004	Japan U23	25	(2)
2003–2011	Japan	31	(1)
Medal record
Kyoto Purple Sanga
Winner	Emperor's Cup	2002
Representing Japan
AFC Asian Cup
Gold medal – first place	2011 Qatar
Asian Games
Silver medal – second place	2002 Busan	Team
- * Club domestic league appearances and goals

Daisuke Matsui (松井 大輔, Matsui Daisuke; born 11 May 1981) is a Japanese former professional footballer who played as a midfielder. He previously played for the Japan national team. His former wife is Japanese actress Rosa Kato.

== Club career ==
=== Early years ===
In 2000, Matsui graduated from Kagoshima Jitsugyo High School (鹿児島実業高校) and began his professional career with Kyoto Purple Sanga of the J1 League.

=== Kyoto Purple Sanga ===
After his J1 League rookie season Purple Sanga were relegated to J2 League. However, the following season Matsui played a prominent role in helping his club finish first in J2, earning the club a promotion back to J1. In 2002 the club continued their success by having a strong season, finishing sixth in the league and winning the Emperor's Cup. The club's success and Matsui's increased exposure lead to Matsui being called up to the national team for the first time in 2003. However, his club was again relegated to J2 after the 2003 season, and could not earn a return to Division 1 after the 2004 season.

=== Le Mans ===
In 2004, after four and a half seasons in Kyoto, Matsui signed with Le Mans of Ligue 2 in France. Matsui chose Le Mans, then a second division club, over Lazio, one of the top clubs in Serie A, because he believed that the style of Italian football was too defensive.

In Japan, Matsui had been criticized for his small physique and mental weakness, but he adapted to the fast, physical style of French football by changing his style and holding on to the ball less. In his first season with Le Mans, he helped the club earn a runners-up finish in Ligue 2 and a promotion to Ligue 1. In 2005–06, in Matsui's first season playing in Ligue 1, Le Mans began undefeated in its first six matches of the season and finished 11th place in the league. Matsui was voted as the Player of the Month for January 2006.

Jean-Sébastien Grond of Football.fr has dubbed Matsui "the sun of Le Mans" (le soleil du Mans), while many Le Mans supporters and the media consider him the top player for the club.

In the 2006–07 season, Matsui appeared in 27 games and Le Mans finished 12th place in Ligue 1.

During the 2007–08 season, Matsui expressed desire to transfer to a new club at the end of the season, when his contract with Le Mans was set to expire. Among the teams which were believed to have shown interest in signing him at the time were Catania, Genoa, Lazio and Torino of Serie A, Celtic and Rangers of the Scottish Premier League, Werder Bremen and Wolfsburg of the Bundesliga, and Lille of Ligue 1.

=== Saint-Étienne ===
At the conclusion of the 2007–08 season, after having played for Le Mans for four consecutive years, Matsui announced his transfer to Saint-Étienne of Ligue 1 on a three-year signing.

In the beginning of the 2008–09 season Matsui was seeing very limited playing time, which was believed to have been due to his poor form combined with a rift with the manager, Laurent Roussey. However, on 10 November 2008 Roussey was released by Saint-Étienne due to the club's poor performance. At the time of Roussey's release the club had lost five consecutive matches and sat in 18th place in the 20-team league, with a record of three wins, nine losses and a draw. During the club's poor slide, Saint-Étienne co-president Roland Romeyer criticized several players including Matsui, whom Romeyer had questioned whether he was a body-double for the 'real' Japanese star Sainté had brought in from Le Mans in the summer.

On 11 November 2008, Saint-Étienne announced that Alain Perrin was appointed as the club's new manager. Perrin had led Olympique Lyonnais to the domestic double in the previous season by winning the Ligue 1 title and the French Cup.

In 2009, Matsui again moved to a new club in the Ligue 1, this time to Grenoble.

=== Grenoble ===
Matsui still showed his qualities by scoring four league goals in the campaign; one versus Lorient on 28 November 2009, two goals against Auxerre on 6 February 2010 and one versus Sochaux on 17 April 2010. However the season with Grenoble was reflected poorly as the team finished bottom of Ligue 1 and was relegated.

=== Tom Tomsk ===
During the summer transfer window in the Russian Premier League, Matsui moved to Siberian club FC Tom Tomsk on loan until the end of the Russian Championship of 2010. He played his first match for his new team on 11 September against Zenit Saint Petersburg and was substituted.

=== Dijon ===
On 5 July 2011, Matsui signed a two-year contract with the club in Dijon, a new entrant in France's Ligue 1.

=== Slavia Sofia ===
On 11 September 2012, Matsui joined Bulgarian A PFG club Slavia Sofia. He made his debut in a 2–0 home win over Lokomotiv Sofia on 23 September, coming on as a half-time substitute for Pavle Popara.

=== Lechia Gdańsk ===
On 3 July 2013, it was announced by Lechia Gdańsk that he had signed a contract for one year with an option of extension. On 22 July in his debut he scored goals in a 2–2 draw against Podbeskidzie Bielsko-Biała.

=== Júbilo Iwata ===
In 2014, Matsui returned to Japan and signed with J2 League club Júbilo Iwata. Júbilo achieved second place in 2015 season and was promoted to J1 League.

=== Odra Opole ===
On 8 August 2017, Matsui signed for Polish club playing in 2016–17 I liga, Odra Opole, for an undisclosed fee.

=== Yokohama FC ===
In 2018, Matsui returned to Japan and signed with J2 League club Yokohama FC.

== International career ==
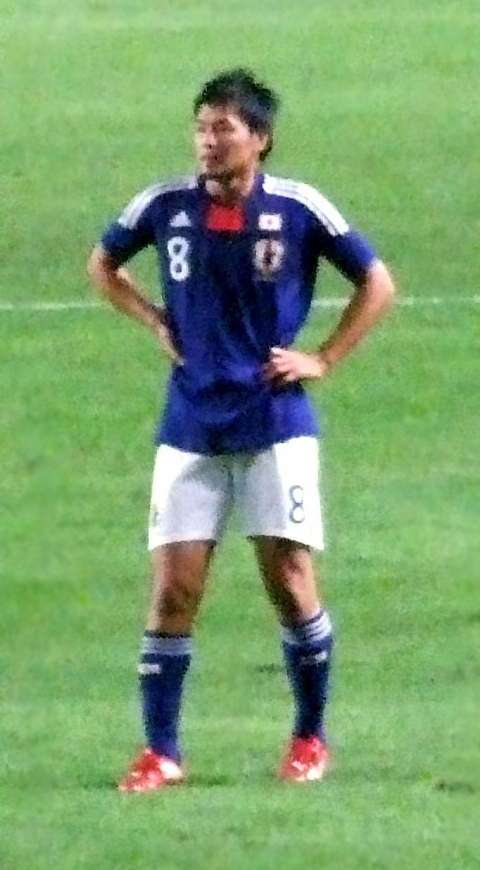
Matsui playing for Japan in 2009

Matsui made his national team debut on 22 June 2003 with Japan at 2003 Confederations Cup against Colombia and scored his international goal against Angola on 11 October 2005. He also played for the U-23 national team at the 2004 Olympics.

Despite his performance at Le Mans, Matsui was not part of Zico's selection for the 2006 World Cup. Former Japan coach Philippe Troussier criticized the decision stating that "Matsui was selected as one of the best foreign players in France and didn't make it into the squad of 23 Zico selected, which is a pity given his form and experience."

Matsui was called up for the first time under Ivica Osim's reign to play in friendlies against Austria and Switzerland in September 2007. Matsui has continued to make national team appearances under Takeshi Okada, who has replaced Osim after Osim suffered a stroke in November 2007. In 2010, Matsu was selected Japan for 2010 World Cup. He played all 4 matches and Japan qualified to the knockout stage. He also played at 2011 Asian Cup. He played 2 matches and Japan won the champions. This Asian Cup was his last game for Japan. He played 31 games and scored 1 goal for Japan until 2011.

== Career statistics ==
=== Club ===
As of end of 2018 season

Appearances and goals by club, season and competition
Club	Season	League		National cup		League cup		Other (Note: Includes Japanese Super Cup, UEFA Cup.)		Total	
Club	Season	Apps	Goals	Apps	Goals	Apps	Goals	Apps	Goals	Apps	Goals
Kyoto Purple Sanga	2000	22	1	1	0	7	1	–		30	2
Kyoto Purple Sanga	2001	37	7	4	0	2	0	–		43	7
Kyoto Purple Sanga	2002	23	4	5	4	2	0	–		30	8
Kyoto Purple Sanga	2003	27	2	1	0	2	0	1	0	31	2
Kyoto Purple Sanga	2004	18	2	0	0	–		–		18	2
Kyoto Purple Sanga	Total	127	16	11	4	13	1	1	0	152	21
Le Mans	2004–05	25	3	0	0	1	0	–		26	3
Le Mans	2005–06	33	3	0	0	2	0	–		35	3
Le Mans	2006–07	27	4	0	0	2	0	–		29	4
Le Mans	2007–08	34	5	2	0	3	2	–		39	7
Le Mans	Total	119	15	2	0	8	2	–		129	17
Saint-Étienne	2008–09	22	1	2	0	1	0	2	0	27	1
Grenoble	2009–10	29	4	2	1	1	0	–		32	5
Grenoble	2010–11	16	1	0	0	–		–		16	1
Grenoble	Total	45	5	2	1	1	0	–		48	6
Tom Tomsk (loan)	2010	7	0	0	0	–		–		7	0
Dijon	2011–12	3	0	0	0	–		–		3	0
Slavia Sofia	2012–13	11	0	2	0	–		–		13	0
Lechia Gdańsk	2013–14	16	4	2	0	–		–		18	4
Júbilo Iwata	2014	36	6	3	0	–		–		39	6
Júbilo Iwata	2015	26	3	0	0	–		–		26	3
Júbilo Iwata	2016	16	0	3	0	3	1	–		22	1
Júbilo Iwata	2017	7	0	1	0	3	0	–		11	0
Júbilo Iwata	Total	85	9	7	0	6	1	–		98	10
Odra Opole	2017–18	3	0	0	0	–		–		3	0
Yokohama FC	2018	9	0	2	0	–		–		11	0
Yokohama FC	2019	28	2	0	0	0	0	0	0	28	2
Yokohama FC	Total	37	2	2	0	–		–		39	2
Career total		476	52	30	5	29	4	3	0	538	61

=== International ===
Appearances and goals by national team and year
National team	Year	Apps	Goals
Japan U23	2002	6	1
Japan U23	2003	2	0
Japan U23	2004	17	1
Total		25	2
Japan	2003	1	0
Japan	2004	0	0
Japan	2005	3	1
Japan	2006	0	0
Japan	2007	2	0
Japan	2008	7	0
Japan	2009	8	0
Japan	2010	8	0
Japan	2011	2	0
Total		31	1

Scores and results list Japan U23's and Japan's goal tally first, score column indicates score after each Matsui goal.

List of international goals scored by Daisuke Matsui
No.	Date	Venue	Opponent	Score	Result	Competition
Japan U23 goals
1	1 October 2002	Munsu Cup Stadium, Ulsan, South Korea	Bahrain	3–0	5–2	2002 Asian Games
2	21 February 2004	Nagai Stadium, Osaka, Japan	South Korea	1–0	2–0	Friendly match (2004 Kirin Challenge Cup)
Japan goals
1	16 November 2005	National Stadium, Tokyo, Japan	Angola	1–0	1–0	Friendly match (2005 Kirin Challenge Cup)

== Honours ==
Kyoto Purple Sanga

- Emperor's Cup: 2002
- J2 League: 2001

Japan

- AFC Asian Cup: 2011
- Kirin Cup: 2008
