= Kindai University Junior and Senior High School =

Coordinates: 34°39′3.5″N 135°35′41″E

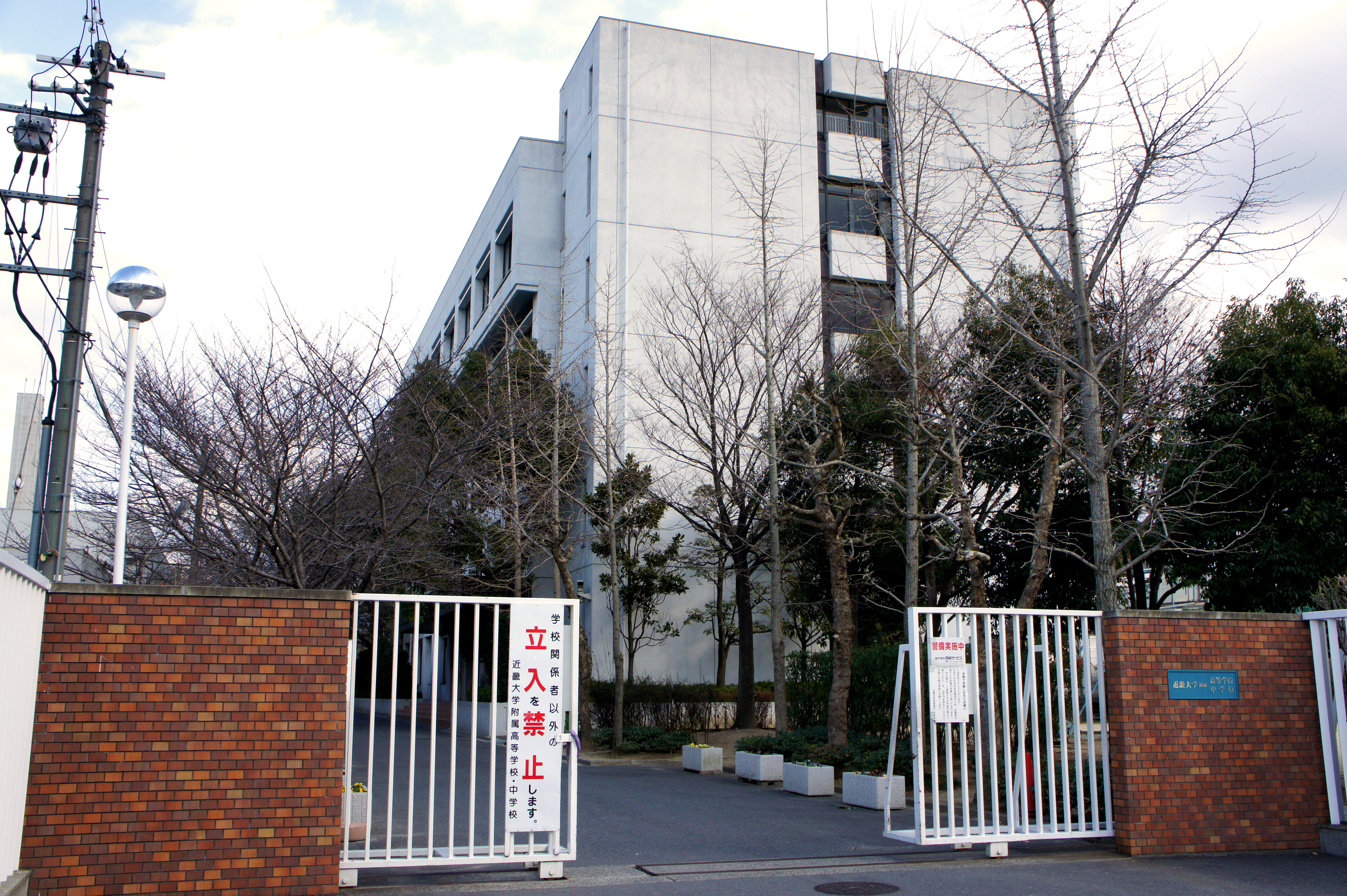

Kindai University Junior and Senior High School (近畿大学附属高等学校・中学校) is a private non-sectarian and coeducational high school located in Higashiosaka, Osaka, Japan. It has senior and junior high school. It was founded in 1939 under Kinki University.

== History ==
- 1939 Founded as Japan Technical School Pernmitted
- 1943 4-year-system Technical School founded
- 1948 Renamed Osaka Science and Engineering University High School
- 1949 Kindai High School & Kindai Junior High School opened
- 1978 Science and Mathematics course started
- 1987 International course started
- 1989 High school moved to new location
- 1990 Coed System started
- 1993 Entered Sister School Relationship with Bothell High School(United States)
- 1994 Entered Sister School Relationship with Inglemoor High School(United States)
- 1996 6-year Educational System introduced
- 2005 Entered Sister School Relationship with Mountain Creek State High School

== Notable alumni ==
- Yo Nishino, - a professional basketball player
