= Hiroyasu Kawakatsu =

Japanese footballer

Hiroyasu Kawakatsu 川勝 博康
Personal information
- Full name: Hiroyasu Kawakatsu
- Date of birth: September 19, 1975 (age 51)
- Place of birth: Kyoto, Japan
- Height: 1.85 m (6 ft 1 in)
- Position: Forward

Youth career
- 1991–1993: Yamashiro High School
- 1994–1997: Doshisha University

Senior career*
Years	Team	Apps	(Gls)
1998–2000	Kyoto Purple Sanga	19	(1)
Total		19	(1)
- * Club domestic league appearances and goals

Hiroyasu Kawakatsu (川勝 博康, Kawakatsu Hiroyasu; born September 19, 1975) is a former Japanese football player.

== Playing career ==
Kawakatsu was born in Kyoto Prefecture on September 19, 1975. After graduating from Doshisha University, he joined his local club, Kyoto Purple Sanga in 1998. He debuted in 1998 and played many matches as a substitute forward through the early part of the 1999 season. However he did not play at all in late 1999 and retired at the end of the 2000 season.

== Career statistics ==
Appearances and goals by club, season and competition
Club	Season	League			Emperor's Cup		J.League Cup		Total	
Club	Season	Division	Apps	Goals	Apps	Goals	Apps	Goals	Apps	Goals
Kyoto Purple Sanga	1998	J1 League	8	1	1	2	0	0	9	3
Kyoto Purple Sanga	1999	J1 League	11	0	0	0	1	1	12	1
Kyoto Purple Sanga	2000	J1 League	0	0	0	0	0	0	0	0
Career total			19	1	1	2	1	1	21	4
