= Takuya Muguruma =

Japanese footballer

Takuya Muguruma 六車 拓也
Personal information
- Full name: Takuya Muguruma
- Date of birth: June 13, 1984 (age 42)
- Place of birth: Kyotanabe, Kyoto, Japan
- Height: 1.84 m (6 ft 1/2 in)
- Position: Midfielder

Youth career
- 2000–2002: Kyoto Purple Sanga

Senior career*
Years	Team	Apps	(Gls)
2003–2005	Kyoto Purple Sanga	17	(0)
2006–2007	Albirex Niigata	2	(0)
2008–2011	Tokushima Vortis	84	(5)
Total		103	(5)
- * Club domestic league appearances and goals

Takuya Muguruma (六車 拓也, Muguruma Takuya; born June 13, 1984) is a former Japanese football player.

== Career statistics ==
Appearances and goals by club, season and competition
Club	Season	League			Emperor's Cup		J.League Cup		Total	
Club	Season	Division	Apps	Goals	Apps	Goals	Apps	Goals	Apps	Goals
Kyoto Purple Sanga	2003	J1 League	0	0	0	0	0	0	0	0
Kyoto Purple Sanga	2004	J2 League	10	0	0	0	—		10	0
Kyoto Purple Sanga	2005	J2 League	7	0	0	0	—		7	0
Albirex Niigata	2006	J1 League	2	0	0	0	1	0	3	0
Albirex Niigata	2007	J1 League	0	0	0	0	0	0	0	0
Tokushima Vortis	2008	J2 League	30	1	1	0	—		31	1
Tokushima Vortis	2009	J2 League	28	3	0	0	—		28	3
Tokushima Vortis	2010	J2 League								
Career total			77	4	1	0	1	0	79	4
