= Gert Engels =

German football manager (born 1957)

Personal information
- Full name: Gert Josef Arthur Engels
- Date of birth: 26 April 1957 (age 69)
- Place of birth: Düren, West Germany
- Height: 1.75 m (5 ft 9 in)
- Position: Midfielder

Senior career*
Years	Team	Apps	(Gls)
1974–1975	SG Düren 99		
1975–1978	Borussia Mönchengladbach		
1978–1980	SV Baesweiler 09		
1980–1990	SG Düren 99		
1990–1991	Prima Aseno FC (Japan)		

International career
1975	Germany U19	5	(0)

Managerial career
- 1990–1991: Prima Aseno FC (player-coach)
- 1991–1993: Takigawa Daini High School (sports teacher)
- 1993–1998: Yokohama Flügels (assistant coach)
- 1998: Yokohama Flügels
- 1999: JEF United Ichihara
- 2000–2003: Kyoto Purple Sanga
- 2004–2008: Urawa Red Diamonds (assistant coach)
- 2008: Urawa Red Diamonds
- 2011–2013: Mozambique
- 2018: Vissel Kobe (assistant coach)
- 2019–2020: Kyoto Sanga (assistant coach)
- 2020–2021: INAC Kobe Leonessa
- 2026: Tokushima Vortis
- * Club domestic league appearances and goals

Gert Engels (born April 26, 1957) is a German football coach and former Bundesliga player who was most recently manager of J2 League team Tokushima Vortis. During his managerial career, he has held a decades-long association to East Asia.

== Summary ==
Coming from a football family, Engels initially played for Borussia Mönchengladbach during their golden decade and later completed a degree in sports science before starting his coaching career in Japan. As a pioneer of the J.League, he significantly influenced modern Japanese professional football and celebrated his greatest successes there.

In various roles, he won the prestigious Japanese Emperor's Cup five times, a Japanese championship, a Japanese Super Cup, and the AFC Champions League in 2007. For his contributions to international football, especially promoting the sporting and cultural connection between Germany and Japan, the UEFA Pro Licence holder was honoured as German Football Ambassador in 2018. Jürgen Klopp was chosen as his successor the following year.

In addition to his coaching positions in Japan and as the national coach of the Mozambique national team, Engels has run a football academy in Germany since 2009. He supports Japanese youth players physically and mentally and helps place them with professional clubs in Germany and Japan. Fluent in Japanese and deeply rooted in Japanese culture, he calls Japan his second home and is affectionately known as a "half-Japanese."

== Career ==
=== Playing Career and Education in Germany ===
Gert Engels began his playing career at SG Düren 99 and later joined Borussia Mönchengladbach, where he was part of the extended squad during the club's most successful period in the 1970s. Without ever playing in the Bundesliga, he won the German championship in both 1976 and 1977 with the team.

Instead of continuing a professional career, he decided at 22 to play only semi-professionally and study sports science. He then first played for SV Baesweiler 09 and later returned to SG Düren 99.

=== Coaching career ===
At the age of 32, Engels ended his playing career and moved to Japan to work as a coach. Starting at the amateur level, he had to learn Japanese – a skill that later proved advantageous when implementing the philosophies of international coaches as an assistant coach.

His first coaching role was as player-coach for Prima Aseno FC, which now competes as Mito Hollyhock in the J2 League. He then worked as sports teacher at Takigawa Daini High School in Akashi. In 1993, Engels became assistant coach for Yokohama Flugels under Shu Kamo. After Kamo took over the Japan national football team, Engels worked under four more coaches, including Carles Rexach of FC Barcelona, before becoming head coach himself in 1998/99, leading the Flugels to win the Emperor's Cup.

After the Flugels merged with the Yokohama Marinos, Engels took over JEF United Ichihara for the rest of the season. He then coached Kyoto Sanga after Shu Kamo. Despite being unable to prevent relegation, he achieved immediate promotion and another Emperor's Cup victory.

In 2004, Engels joined Urawa Red Diamonds as an assistant coach and worked with Guido Buchwald. Together they won the Emperor's Cup in 2005 and the double of the Emperor's Cup and the championship in 2006. After Buchwald's resignation, Engels continued working with Holger Osieck. The duo won the AFC Champions League in 2007 – the first international title for Urawa and Japan in that competition. Engels became head coach after Osieck's dismissal, leading the team in 42 matches before Volker Finke took over.

In 2011, Engels became the head coach of the Mozambique national football team, resigning two years later due to unsatisfactory results. He won three of his twelve international matches, including a notable 2-0 victory against Morocco on September 9, 2012.

For the next five years, Engels focused on his football school in Germany before returning to Japan in 2018 as an assistant coach for Vissel Kobe, working with Takayuki Yoshida, one of his former students. At Kobe, Engels coached world champions like Andrés Iniesta and Lukas Podolski. After Yoshida was dismissed as head coach, Engels left the club and served as an assistant coach at Kyoto Sanga under Ichizo Nakata for one season. During the pandemic, he coached at INAC Kobe Leonessa for the first time a women's team. He led them to the 2020 Japanese runner-up position.

On 28 December 2025, Engels was announce official appointment manager of Tokushima Vortis from 2026 due to replace Kosaku Masuda. In May 2026, after initially announcing a leave of absence from the club, he was dismissed in his role after 14 games in charge.

== Achievements ==
=== International ===
- AFC Champions League: Winner 2007
- FIFA Club World Cup: 3rd place 2007

=== National ===
- J.League: Champion 2006, runner-up 2004, 2005, 2007
- WE League: Runner-up 2020
- J2 League: Champion 2001
- Emperor's Cup: Winner 1993, 1998, 2002, 2005, 2006, finalist 1997
- Japanese Super Cup: Winner 2006
- J.League Cup: Finalist 2004

=== Other Achievements ===
- German Football Ambassador: 2018

== Miscellaneous ==
- Since 2009, Engels has run the football school “SoccerLife” in his hometown of Düren. He offers training for Japanese players and teams in Düren and organizes training camps nationwide. He also facilitates player transfers to clubs in his home region between Aachen, Cologne, and Mönchengladbach.
- During the 2002 FIFA World Cup in Japan and South Korea, Engels worked as a TV analyst for Japanese television.
- Engels was once considered for the head coach position of North Korea’s serial champion April 25 SC. His visit to assess the club turned into an adventure.
- Michael Weiß, the most successful national team coach of Mongolia, began his coaching career at Kyoto Sanga under Engels.
- Engels is married to a Filipina and has two children.
