= 2002 Emperor's Cup =

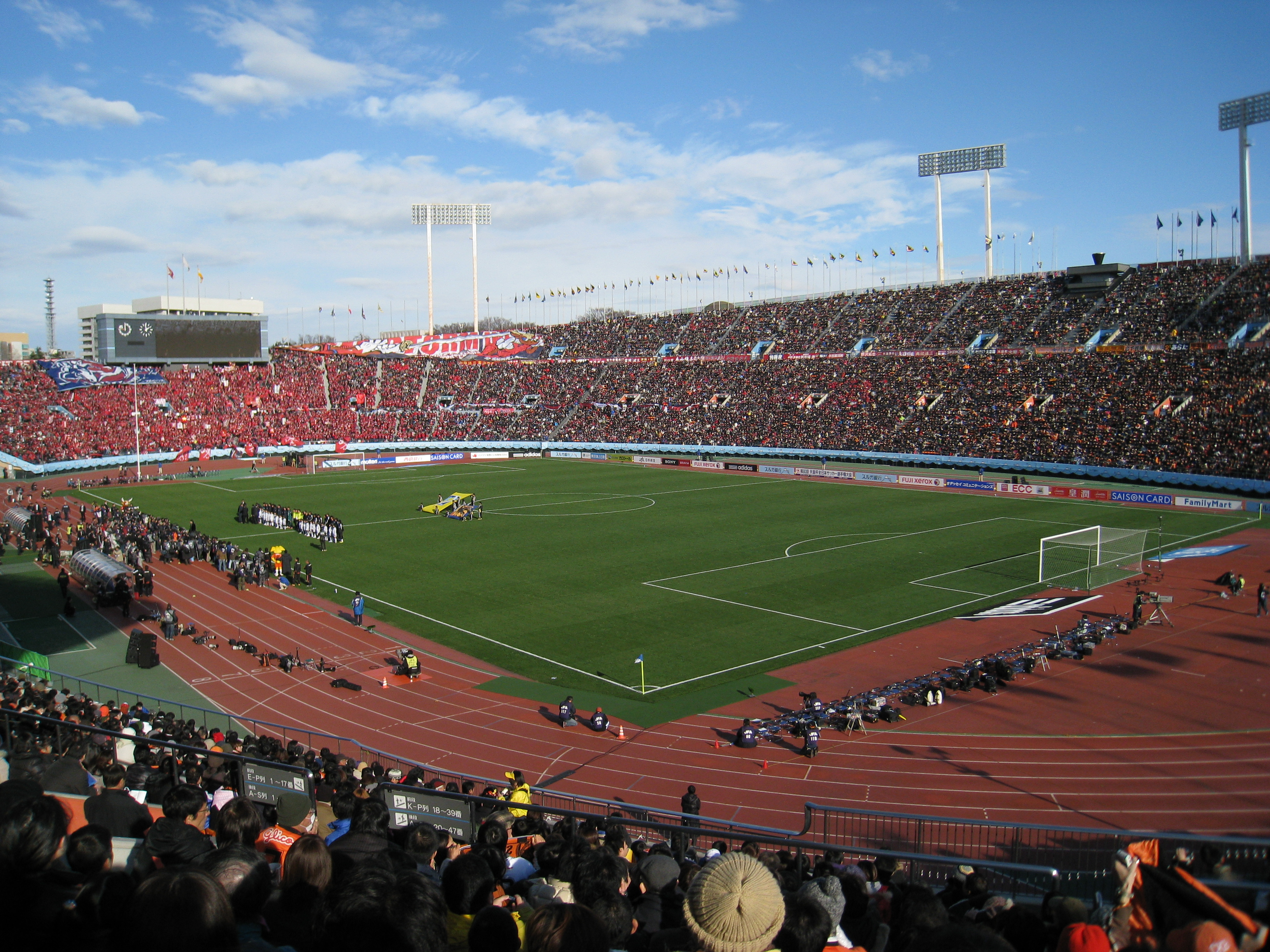
- KokuritshuKasumigaoka stadium

Tournament details
- Country: Japan
- Teams: 80

Final positions
- Champions: Kyoto Purple Sanga (1st title)
- Runners-up: Kashima Antlers
- Semifinalists: Sanfrecce Hiroshima; JEF United Ichihara

The 82nd Emperor's Cup statistics of the Emperor's Cup in the 2002 season.

== Overview ==
It was contested by 80 teams, and Kyoto Purple Sanga won the cup.

== Results ==
=== First round ===
- West Kagawa High School 0–1 Kokushikan University
- YSCC 1–7 Otsuka Pharmaceuticals
- Kunimi High School 3–0 Yamagata Chuo High School
- Centro de Futebol Edu 3–1 Volca Kagoshima
- International Budo University 1–2 Oita Trinita
- Teihens FC 0–6 Cerezo Osaka
- Iwami FC 2–1 Fukui KSC
- Tokuyama University 0–2 Sagawa Express Osaka
- Tsukuba University 1–3 Ventforet Kofu
- Ohara Gakuen JaSRA 0–1 Avispa Fukuoka
- Fukuoka University of Education 1–2 Alouette Kumamoto
- Tochigi SC 3–1 Iwate University
- Kyushu INAX 0–5 Mito HollyHock
- Takada 0–3 Yokohama FC
- Sagawa Printing 1–0 TDK
- Denso 1–1(PK 3–1) Sapporo University
- Gunma Horikoshi 2–1 Montedio Yamagata
- Kwansei Gakuin University 2–5 Sagan Tosu
- Tokyo Gakugei University 5–1 Hachinohe University
- Saitama 2–1 YKK AP SC
- Fukushima University 1–5 Omiya Ardija
- Nangoku Kochi 1–4 Shonan Bellmare
- Sony Sendai 2–3 Japan Soccer College
- Ehime FC 6–1 Mitsubishi Nagasaki SC
- Muchz FC 0–7 Kawasaki Frontale
- Kihoku Shukyudan 0–9 Albirex Niigata
- Tottori 2–1 Alex SC
- Profesor Miyazaki 4–3 Kibi International University
- Okinawa Kariyushi 2–3 Honda FC
- Kakamihara High School 0–9 Komazawa University
- Oita Trinita U-18 1–1(PK 5–3) Sanfrecce Hiroshima Youth
- Nirasaki Astros 0–2 Hamamatsu University

=== Second round ===
- Kokushikan University 1–2 Kunimi High School
- Otsuka Pharmaceuticals 3–0 Centro de Futebol Edu
- Oita Trinita 3–0 Iwami FC
- Cerezo Osaka 4–1 Sagawa Express Osaka
- Ventforet Kofu 2–0 Alouette Kumamoto
- Avispa Fukuoka 2–1 Tochigi SC
- Mito HollyHock 4–0 Sagawa Printing
- Yokohama 3–2 Denso
- Gunma Horikoshi 0–1 Tokyo Gakugei University
- Sagan Tosu 7–0 Saitama
- Omiya Ardija 4–0 Japan Soccer College
- Shonan Bellmare 1–0 Ehime
- Kawasaki Frontale 6–0 Tottori
- Albirex Niigata 1–0 Profesor Miyazaki
- Honda 3–0 Oita Trinita U-18
- Komazawa University 1–0 Hamamatsu University

=== Third round ===
- Júbilo Iwata 2–0 Kunimi High School
- Nagoya Grampus Eight 2–0 Otsuka Pharmaceuticals
- Consadole Sapporo 0–5 Oita Trinita
- Kashiwa Reysol 1–2 Cerezo Osaka
- Vegalta Sendai 1–0 Ventforet Kofu
- Urawa Red Diamonds 1–2 Avispa Fukuoka
- JEF United Ichihara 4–0 Mito HollyHock
- Kyoto Purple Sanga 4–0 Yokohama
- Kashima Antlers 4–0 Tokyo Gakugei University
- Shimizu S-Pulse 4–2 Sagan Tosu
- Tokyo Verdy 0–2 Omiya Ardija
- Tokyo 3–4 Shonan Bellmare
- Vissel Kobe 1–3 Kawasaki Frontale
- Sanfrecce Hiroshima 2–0 Albirex Niigata
- Gamba Osaka 3–1 Honda FC
- Yokohama F. Marinos 3–0 Komazawa University

=== Fourth round ===
- Júbilo Iwata 2–0 Oita Trinita
- Nagoya Grampus Eight 5–2 Cerezo Osaka
- Vegalta Sendai 1–2 JEF United Ichihara
- Avispa Fukuoka 0–1 Kyoto Purple Sanga
- Kashima Antlers 1–0 Omiya Ardija
- Shimizu S-Pulse 3–2 Shonan Bellmare
- Kawasaki Frontale 1–0 Gamba Osaka
- Sanfrecce Hiroshima 2–1 Yokohama F. Marinos

=== Quarter-finals ===
- Júbilo Iwata 0–1 JEF United Ichihara
- Nagoya Grampus Eight 0–1 Kyoto Purple Sanga
- Kashima Antlers 1–0 Kawasaki Frontale
- Shimizu S-Pulse 1–3 Sanfrecce Hiroshima

=== Semi-finals ===
- JEF United Ichihara 0–2 Kashima Antlers
- Kyoto Purple Sanga 2–1 Sanfrecce Hiroshima

=== Final ===
- Kashima Antlers 1–2 Kyoto Purple Sanga

Kyoto Purple Sanga won the cup and guaranteed a place in the 2004 AFC Champions League But Sanga were relegated to the Division 2 in 2003 so this spot was transferred to Yokohama F. Marinos, the 2002 J.League Division 1 runner-up.
