= 1998 Emperor's Cup final =

1998 Emperor's Cup Final
Yokohama Flügels	Shimizu S-Pulse
2	1
- Date: January 1, 1999
- Venue: National Stadium, Tokyo

1998 Emperor's Cup Final was the 78th final of the Emperor's Cup competition. The final was played at National Stadium in Tokyo on January 1, 1999. Yokohama Flügels won the championship.

== Overview ==
Yokohama Flügels won their 2nd title, by defeating Shimizu S-Pulse 2–1 with goals from Yoshikiyo Kuboyama and Takayuki Yoshida. This would be the Yokohama Flugels' last ever game, before being merged with the Yokohama Marinos to become the modern day Yokohama F Marinos.

== Match details ==
January 1, 1999

Yokohama Flügels	2–1	Shimizu S-Pulse
Yoshikiyo Kuboyama 44'; Takayuki Yoshida 72'		Masaaki Sawanobori 13'

National Stadium

Yokohama Flügels
GK	1	(Japan) Seigo Narazaki
DF	4	(Japan) Jin Sato
DF	7	(Japan) Takeo Harada
DF	13	(Japan) Koji Maeda
MF	12	(Japan) Yasuhiro Hato
MF	8	(Brazil) Sampaio
MF	5	(Japan) Motohiro Yamaguchi
MF	6	(Japan) Atsuhiro Miura
MF	10	(Japan) Hideki Nagai
FW	9	(Japan) Takayuki Yoshida	(substituted off) 83'
FW	22	(Japan) Yoshikiyo Kuboyama
Substitutes:
GK	16	(Japan) Hiroshi Sato
MF	2	(Japan) Kazuki Sato
FW	24	(Japan) Hideyuki Ujiie
FW	28	(Japan) Hideo Oshima
FW	29	(Brazil) Anderson	(substituted on) 83'
Manager:
(Germany) Engels

Shimizu S-Pulse
GK	1	(Japan) Masanori Sanada
DF	11	(Japan) Ryuzo Morioka
DF	2	(Japan) Toshihide Saito
DF	14	(Japan) Kazuyuki Toda
MF	3	(Japan) Masahiro Ando
MF	5	(Brazil) Santos	(substituted off) 76'
MF	7	(Japan) Teruyoshi Ito
MF	25	(Japan) Daisuke Ichikawa
MF	10	(Japan) Masaaki Sawanobori
FW	9	(Japan) Kenta Hasegawa	(substituted off) 60'
FW	12	(Brazil) Fabinho
Substitutes:
GK	16	(Japan) Koji Nakahara
DF	19	(Japan) Junji Nishizawa
MF	6	(Japan) Katsumi Oenoki	(substituted on) 76' (substituted off) 89'
MF	17	(Brazil) Alex	(substituted on) 60'
FW	26	(Japan) Kohei Hiramatsu	(substituted on) 89'
Manager:
(England) Perryman

== See also ==
- 1998 Emperor's Cup
