= 1997 Emperor's Cup final =

1997 Emperor's Cup Final
Kashima Antlers	Yokohama Flügels
3	0
- Date: January 1, 1998
- Venue: National Stadium, Tokyo

1997 Emperor's Cup Final was the 77th final of the Emperor's Cup competition. The final was played at National Stadium in Tokyo on January 1, 1998. Kashima Antlers won the championship.

== Overview ==
Kashima Antlers won their 1st title, by defeating Yokohama Flügels 3–0 with Tadatoshi Masuda, Mazinho and Atsushi Yanagisawa goal.

== Match details ==
January 1, 1998

Kashima Antlers	3–0	Yokohama Flügels
Tadatoshi Masuda 4'; Mazinho 25'; Atsushi Yanagisawa 87'

National Stadium

Kashima Antlers
GK	21	(Japan) Yohei Sato
DF	32	(Japan) Akira Narahashi
DF	3	(Japan) Yutaka Akita
DF	4	(Japan) Ryosuke Okuno
DF	7	(Japan) Naoki Soma
MF	6	(Japan) Yasuto Honda
MF	2	(Brazil) Jorginho
MF	10	(Brazil) Bismarck
MF	14	(Japan) Tadatoshi Masuda
FW	8	(Brazil) Mazinho
FW	13	(Japan) Atsushi Yanagisawa
Substitutes:
Manager:
(Brazil) Joao Carlos

Yokohama Flügels
GK	1	(Japan) Seigo Narazaki
DF	25	(Japan) Kazuki Sato
DF	13	(Japan) Koji Maeda
DF	3	(Japan) Norihiro Satsukawa
DF	6	(Japan) Atsuhiro Miura
MF	17	(Japan) Seiichiro Okuno
MF	8	(Brazil) Sampaio
MF	5	(Japan) Motohiro Yamaguchi
MF	19	(Japan) Takeo Harada	(substituted off) 63'
FW	31	(Brazil) Fernando
FW	11	(Japan) Hiroki Hattori
Substitutes:
	18	(Japan) Shinya Mitsuoka	(substituted on) 63'
Manager:
(Brazil) Otacilio

== See also ==
- 1997 Emperor's Cup
