= 1997 Yokohama Flügels season =

Yokohama Flügels
1997 season
- Manager: Otacílio
- Stadium: Yokohama Mitsuzawa Stadium
- J.League: 6th
- Emperor's Cup: Runners-up
- J.League Cup: Semifinals
- Top goalscorer: Válber (20)
Home colours	Away colours

1997 Yokohama Flügels season

== Competitions ==
Competitions	Position
J.League	6th / 17 clubs
Emperor's Cup	Runners-up
J.League Cup	Semifinals

== Domestic results ==
=== J.League ===
12 April 1997 1-1	Yokohama Flügels	3-1	Avispa Fukuoka	Yokohama Mitsuzawa Stadium
JST (UTC+09)

16 April 1997 1-2	Cerezo Osaka	0-2	Yokohama Flügels	Osaka Nagai Stadium
JST (UTC+09)

19 April 1997 1-3	Yokohama Flügels	3-1	Vissel Kobe	Yokohama Mitsuzawa Stadium
JST (UTC+09)

23 April 1997 1-4	Kashima Antlers	1-0	Yokohama Flügels	Kashima Soccer Stadium
JST (UTC+09)

26 April 1997 1-5	Yokohama Flügels	2-0	Nagoya Grampus Eight	Yokohama Mitsuzawa Stadium
JST (UTC+09)

1-6	bye

7 May 1997 1-7	Júbilo Iwata	3-1	Yokohama Flügels	Júbilo Iwata Stadium
JST (UTC+09)

10 May 1997 1-8	Yokohama Flügels	2-0	Kashiwa Reysol	Tokyo National Stadium
JST (UTC+09)

2 July 1997 1-9	Urawa Red Diamonds	1-3	Yokohama Flügels	Urawa Komaba Stadium
JST (UTC+09)

24 May 1997 1-10	Yokohama Flügels	2-1	Gamba Osaka	Toyama Athletic Stadium
JST (UTC+09)

28 May 1997 1-11	Verdy Kawasaki	0-4	Yokohama Flügels	Todoroki Athletics Stadium
JST (UTC+09)

31 May 1997 1-12	Yokohama Flügels	0-1	Kyoto Purple Sanga	Yokohama Mitsuzawa Stadium
JST (UTC+09)

5 July 1997 1-13	JEF United Ichihara	0-4	Yokohama Flügels	Niigata City Athletic Stadium
JST (UTC+09)

9 July 1997 1-14	Yokohama Flügels	2-1	Bellmare Hiratsuka	Yokohama Mitsuzawa Stadium
JST (UTC+09)

12 July 1997 1-15	Yokohama Marinos	1-0	Yokohama Flügels	Yokohama Mitsuzawa Stadium
JST (UTC+09)

16 July 1997 1-16	Yokohama Flügels	4-3 (GG) (a.e.t.)	Shimizu S-Pulse	Yokohama Mitsuzawa Stadium
JST (UTC+09)

19 July 1997 1-17	Sanfrecce Hiroshima	2-3	Yokohama Flügels	Hiroshima Big Arch
JST (UTC+09)

30 July 1997 2-1	Shimizu S-Pulse	3-1	Yokohama Flügels	Nihondaira Sports Stadium
JST (UTC+09)

2 August 1997 2-2	Avispa Fukuoka	0-1 (GG) (a.e.t.)	Yokohama Flügels	Hakatanomori Football Stadium
JST (UTC+09)

6 August 1997 2-3	Yokohama Flügels	1-2 (GG) (a.e.t.)	Cerezo Osaka	Yokohama Mitsuzawa Stadium
JST (UTC+09)

9 August 1997 2-4	Vissel Kobe	2-3	Yokohama Flügels	Kobe Universiade Memorial Stadium
JST (UTC+09)

16 August 1997 2-5	Yokohama Flügels	5-3	Kashima Antlers	Yokohama Mitsuzawa Stadium
JST (UTC+09)

20 August 1997 2-6	Nagoya Grampus Eight	2-1	Yokohama Flügels	Mizuho Athletic Stadium
JST (UTC+09)

2-7	bye

30 August 1997 2-8	Yokohama Flügels	0-2	Júbilo Iwata	Yokohama Mitsuzawa Stadium
JST (UTC+09)

3 September 1997 2-9	Kashiwa Reysol	0-2	Yokohama Flügels	Hitachi Kashiwa Soccer Stadium
JST (UTC+09)

6 September 1997 2-10	Yokohama Flügels	1-3	Urawa Red Diamonds	Yokohama Mitsuzawa Stadium
JST (UTC+09)

10 September 1997 2-11	Yokohama Flügels	2-3	Yokohama Marinos	Yokohama Mitsuzawa Stadium
JST (UTC+09)

13 September 1997 2-12	Gamba Osaka	2-1	Yokohama Flügels	Osaka Expo '70 Stadium
JST (UTC+09)

20 September 1997 2-13	Kyoto Purple Sanga	1-2	Yokohama Flügels	Nishikyogoku Athletic Stadium
JST (UTC+09)

24 September 1997 2-14	Yokohama Flügels	0-1	Verdy Kawasaki	Tokyo National Stadium
JST (UTC+09)

27 September 1997 2-15	Yokohama Flügels	1-2 (GG) (a.e.t.)	JEF United Ichihara	Kagoshima Kamoike Stadium
JST (UTC+09)

1 October 1997 2-16	Bellmare Hiratsuka	0-0 (GG) (a.e.t.) (4-5 p)	Yokohama Flügels	Hiratsuka Athletics Stadium
JST (UTC+09)

4 October 1997 2-17	Yokohama Flügels	2-1	Sanfrecce Hiroshima	Yokohama Mitsuzawa Stadium
JST (UTC+09)

=== Emperor's Cup ===
1st Round	bye

2nd Round	bye

14 December 1997 3rd Round	Yokohama Flügels	4-3	Komazawa University	Yokohama Mitsuzawa Stadium
JST (UTC+09)

20 December 1997 4th Round	JEF United Ichihara	1-2	Yokohama Flügels	Sendai Stadium
JST (UTC+09)

23 December 1997 Quarterfinals	Shimizu S-Pulse	1-6	Yokohama Flügels	Ehime Matsuyama Athletic Stadium
JST (UTC+09)

28 December 1997 Semifinals	Júbilo Iwata	2-3	Yokohama Flügels	Kobe Universiade Memorial Stadium
JST (UTC+09)

1 January 1998 Final	Kashima Antlers	3-0	Yokohama Flügels	Tokyo National Stadium
JST (UTC+09)

=== J.League Cup ===
8 March 1997 GL-E-1	Yokohama Flügels	1-2	Júbilo Iwata	Yokohama Mitsuzawa Stadium
JST (UTC+09)

15 March 1997 GL-E-2	Avispa Fukuoka	1-1	Yokohama Flügels	Hakatanomori Football Stadium
JST (UTC+09)

19 March 1997 GL-E-3	Kyoto Purple Sanga	0-1	Yokohama Flügels	Nishikyogoku Athletic Stadium
JST (UTC+09)

22 March 1997 GL-E-4	Yokohama Flügels	1-0	Avispa Fukuoka	Yokohama Mitsuzawa Stadium
JST (UTC+09)

26 March 1997 GL-E-5	Yokohama Flügels	1-0	Kyoto Purple Sanga	Yokohama Mitsuzawa Stadium
JST (UTC+09)

29 March 1997 GL-E-6	Júbilo Iwata	0-0	Yokohama Flügels	Júbilo Iwata Stadium
JST (UTC+09)

15 October 1997 Quarterfinals-1	Yokohama Flügels	0-1	Kashiwa Reysol	Yokohama Mitsuzawa Stadium
JST (UTC+09)

18 October 1997 Quarterfinals-2	Kashiwa Reysol	0-3 (1-3 agg.)	Yokohama Flügels	Hitachi Kashiwa Soccer Stadium
JST (UTC+09)

1 November 1997 Semifinals-1	Yokohama Flügels	1-0	Júbilo Iwata	Yokohama Mitsuzawa Stadium
JST (UTC+09)

9 November 1997 Semifinals-2	Júbilo Iwata	2-0 (GG) (a.e.t.) (2-1 agg.)	Yokohama Flügels	Júbilo Iwata Stadium
JST (UTC+09)

== Player statistics ==
No.	Pos.	Nat.	Player	D.o.B. (Age)	Height / Weight	J.League		Emperor's Cup		J.League Cup		Total	
No.	Pos.	Nat.	Player	D.o.B. (Age)	Height / Weight	Apps	Goals	Apps	Goals	Apps	Goals	Apps	Goals
1	GK	(Japan)	Seigo Narazaki	April 15, 1976 (aged 20)	185 cm / 76 kg	24	0	5	0	7	0	36	0
2	DF	(Japan)	Yoshiro Moriyama	November 9, 1967 (aged 29)	176 cm / 72 kg	27	0	0	0	6	0	33	0
3	DF	(Japan)	Norihiro Satsukawa	April 18, 1972 (aged 24)	175 cm / 73 kg	27	0	5	0	10	0	42	0
4	DF	(Japan)	Naoto Otake	October 18, 1968 (aged 28)	178 cm / 73.5 kg	24	0	0	0	10	0	34	0
5	MF	(Japan)	Motohiro Yamaguchi	January 29, 1969 (aged 28)	177 cm / 72 kg	19	6	5	1	1	0	25	7
6	MF	(Japan)	Atsuhiro Miura	July 24, 1974 (aged 22)	176 cm / 69 kg	32	3	5	2	10	1	47	6
7	MF	(Japan)	Yoshikiyo Kuboyama	July 21, 1976 (aged 20)	171 cm / 60 kg	0	0		0	0	0		0
8	MF	(Brazil)	Sampaio	March 31, 1968 (aged 28)	177 cm / 74 kg	29	6	2	0	9	1	40	7
9	MF	(Brazil)	Válber	December 6, 1971 (aged 25)	174 cm / 68 kg	31	20	0	0	10	5	41	25
10	MF	(Brazil)	Zinho	June 17, 1967 (aged 29)	172 cm / 71 kg	15	3	0	0	6	1	21	4
11	FW	(Japan)	Hiroki Hattori	August 30, 1971 (aged 25)	180 cm / 76 kg	29	11	5	4	8	1	42	16
12	MF	(Japan)	Yasuhiro Hato	May 4, 1976 (aged 20)	178 cm / 70 kg	9	0	1	0	4	0	14	0
13	DF	(Japan)	Koji Maeda	February 3, 1969 (aged 28)	178 cm / 74 kg	21	0	5	0	10	0	36	0
14	DF	(Japan)	Shoji Nonoshita	May 24, 1970 (aged 26)	182 cm / 74 kg	18	2	2	0	0	0	20	2
15	FW	(Japan)	Takayuki Yoshida	March 14, 1977 (aged 19)	172 cm / 63 kg	21	0	4	3	5	0	30	3
16	GK	(Japan)	Hiroyuki Nitao	November 27, 1973 (aged 23)	181 cm / 77 kg	0	0		0	0	0		0
17	DF	(Japan)	Seiichiro Okuno	July 26, 1974 (aged 22)	180 cm / 71 kg	6	0	5	1	3	0	14	1
18	MF	(Japan)	Shinya Mitsuoka	April 22, 1976 (aged 20)	176 cm / 67 kg	6	0	5	1	1	0	12	1
19	MF	(Japan)	Takeo Harada	October 2, 1971 (aged 25)	173 cm / 72 kg	20	2	4	0	9	0	33	2
20	MF	(Japan)	Satoshi Yoneyama	June 27, 1974 (aged 22)	171 cm / 65 kg	4	0	0	0	0	0	4	0
21	GK	(Japan)	Yoshitaka Kishikawa	January 16, 1979 (aged 18)	182 cm / 73 kg	0	0		0	0	0		0
22	MF	(Japan)	Haruki Seto	March 14, 1978 (aged 18)	180 cm / 70 kg	7	0	1	0	1	0	9	0
23	GK	(Japan)	Atsuhiko Mori	May 31, 1972 (aged 24)	179 cm / 73 kg	0	0	0	0	0	0	0	0
24	MF	(Japan)	Yuki Inoue	October 31, 1977 (aged 19)	172 cm / 63 kg	0	0		0	0	0		0
25	MF	(Japan)	Kazuki Sato	June 27, 1974 (aged 22)	170 cm / 63 kg	3	0	4	1	0	0	7	1
26	DF	(Japan)	Jin Sato	September 27, 1974 (aged 22)	180 cm / 76 kg	3	0	1	0	0	0	4	0
27	DF	(Brazil)	Marcelo	September 10, 1977 (aged 19)	182 cm / 82 kg	0	0		0	0	0		0
28	MF	(Japan)	Takahiro Okubo	April 29, 1974 (aged 22)	166 cm / 66 kg	2	0	0	0	0	0	2	0
30	GK	(Japan)	Hiroshi Sato	March 7, 1972 (aged 25)	181 cm / 74 kg	8	0	0	0	3	0	11	0
29	FW	(Japan)	Takashi Sakurai †	May 4, 1977 (aged 19)	-cm / -kg	0	0		0	0	0		0
31	FW	(Brazil)	Fernando †	March 13, 1974 (aged 22)	182 cm / 81 kg	14	5	5	2	4	0	23	7
32	FW	(Brazil)	Anderson †	February 15, 1977 (aged 20)	-cm / -kg	0	0		0	0	0		0

- † player(s) joined the team after the opening of this season.

== Transfers ==
In:

No.	Pos.	Nation	Player
16	GK	JPN	Hiroyuki Nitao (from JEF United Ichihara)
21	GK	JPN	Yoshitaka Kishikawa (from Makuhari Senior High School)
26	DF	JPN	Jin Sato (from Kokushikan University)
27	DF	BRA	Marcelo Alessandro Gomes da Silva (from Makuhari Senior High School)
9	MF	BRA	Válber da Silva Costa (from Vasco da Gama)
25	MF	JPN	Kazuki Sato (from University of Tsukuba)
28	MF	JPN	Takahiro Okubo (from Shizuoka University)

Out:

No.	Pos.	Nation	Player
—	GK	JPN	Ryoma Sugihara
—	DF	JPN	Junji Koizumi (to Kawasaki Frontale)
—	DF	JPN	Nobuyuki Oishi
—	MF	JPN	Hideki Katsura (to Kawasaki Frontale)
—	MF	JPN	Masaaki Takada (to Vissel Kobe)
—	MF	JPN	Masakiyo Maezono (to Verdy Kawasaki)
—	MF	JPN	Atsushi Moriyama (to Montedio Yamagata)
—	MF	BRA	Denilson
—	FW	BRA	Evair
—	FW	JPN	Osamu Maeda (retired)
—	FW	JPN	Yoshiyuki Sakamoto
—	FW	JPN	Hideaki Kaetsu
—	FW	JPN	Shinya Tanimoto

== Transfers during the season ==
=== In ===
- (Japan) Takashi Sakurai (loan return from Gimnasia on June)
- (Brazil) Fernando Luiz Rech (on July)
- (Brazil) Anderson Gils de Sampaio (from Flamengo on September)

=== Out ===
- (Japan) Atsuhiko Mori (to Consadole Sapporo)

== Awards ==
- J.League Best XI: (Japan) Motohiro Yamaguchi

== Other pages ==
- (in Japanese) J. League official site
- (in Japanese) Yokohama F. Marinos official web site
