= Yuki Inoue (footballer) =

Japanese footballer (born 1977)

Yuki Inoue 井上 雄幾
Personal information
- Full name: Yuki Inoue
- Date of birth: October 31, 1977 (age 49)
- Place of birth: Kanagawa, Japan
- Height: 1.73 m (5 ft 8 in)
- Position: Defender

Youth career
- 1993–1995: Yokohama Flügels

Senior career*
Years	Team	Apps	(Gls)
1996–1998	Yokohama Flügels	9	(0)
1999–2001	JEF United Ichihara	10	(0)
2001	Sagawa Express Tokyo	3	(0)
2002–2004	Montedio Yamagata	80	(4)
2005–2008	Ventforet Kofu	78	(1)
2009	Tochigi SC	15	(0)
2009–2010	Blaublitz Akita	36	(0)
2011	Tonan Maebashi	11	(0)
Total		242	(5)
Medal record
Yokohama Flügels
Winner	Emperor's Cup	1998
Runner-up	Emperor's Cup	1997
- * Club domestic league appearances and goals

Yuki Inoue (井上 雄幾, Inoue Yūki; born October 31, 1977) is a former Japanese football player.

== Playing career ==
Inoue was born in Kanagawa Prefecture on October 31, 1977. He joined his local club, the Yokohama Flügels, as part of the youth team in 1996. Although he debuted in 1998, the club was disbanded at the end of the 1998 season due to financial strain. In 1999, he moved to JEF United Ichihara. Although he played for three seasons, he did not play in many matches. In August 2001, he moved to the Japan Football League (JFL) club Sagawa Express Tokyo. He was a regular player, playing as a defensive midfielder in 2002 and left side back in 2003. However he did not play any games in 2004. In 2005, he moved to the Ventforet Kofu. He played often as left side back. In 2009, he moved to the newly promoted J2 League club, Tochigi SC. Although he played as a regular player through June, he did not play as much after that. In September 2009, he moved to the JFL club TDK (later Blaublitz Akita). He played as a regular player until 2010. In 2011, he moved to the Regional Leagues club Tonan Maebashi. He retired at the end of the 2011 season.

== Career statistics ==
Appearances and goals by club, season and competition
Club	Season	League			Emperor's Cup		J.League Cup		Total	
Club	Season	Division	Apps	Goals	Apps	Goals	Apps	Goals	Apps	Goals
Yokohama Flügels	1996	J1 League	0	0	0	0	0	0	0	0
Yokohama Flügels	1997	J1 League	0	0	0	0	0	0	0	0
Yokohama Flügels	1998	J1 League	9	0	0	0	2	0	11	0
JEF United Ichihara	1999	J1 League	7	0	0	0	0	0	7	0
JEF United Ichihara	2000	J1 League	3	0	0	0	3	0	6	0
JEF United Ichihara	2001	J1 League	0	0	0	0	0	0	0	0
Sagawa Express Tokyo	2001	Football League	3	0	4	0	-		7	0
Montedio Yamagata	2002	J2 League	41	1	1	0	-		42	1
Montedio Yamagata	2003	J2 League	31	1	1	0	-		32	1
Montedio Yamagata	2004	J2 League	8	2	0	0	-		8	2
Ventforet Kofu	2005	J2 League	27	1	1	1	-		28	2
Ventforet Kofu	2006	J1 League	11	0	2	0	1	0	14	0
Ventforet Kofu	2007	J1 League	25	0	0	0	8	0	33	0
Ventforet Kofu	2008	J2 League	15	0	0	0	0	0	15	0
Tochigi SC	2009	J2 League	15	0	0	0	-		15	0
TDK	2009	Football League	8	0	0	0	-		8	0
Blaublitz Akita	2010	Football League	28	0	1	0	-		29	0
Tonan Maebashi	2011	Regional Leagues	11	0	-		-		11	0
Career total			242	5	10	1	14	0	266	6
