= Shoji Nonoshita =

Japanese footballer

Shoji Nonoshita 埜下 荘司
Personal information
- Full name: Shoji Nonoshita
- Date of birth: May 24, 1970 (age 56)
- Place of birth: Ehime, Japan
- Height: 1.82 m (5 ft 11 1/2 in)
- Position: Defender

Youth career
- 1986–1988: Minamiuwa High School
- 1989–1992: Osaka University of Commerce

Senior career*
Years	Team	Apps	(Gls)
1993–1995	Gamba Osaka	11	(0)
1996–1998	Yokohama Flügels	28	(2)
1998–1999	Consadole Sapporo	5	(0)
Total		44	(2)
Medal record
Yokohama Flügels
Winner	Emperor's Cup	1998
Runner-up	Emperor's Cup	1997
- * Club domestic league appearances and goals

Shoji Nonoshita (埜下 荘司, Nonoshita Shōji; born May 24, 1970) is a former Japanese football player.

== Playing career ==
Nonoshita was born in Ehime Prefecture on May 24, 1970. After graduating from Osaka University of Commerce, he joined Gamba Osaka in 1993. Although he played as center back from first season, he could not play many matches. In 1996, he moved to Yokohama Flügels. He played many matches as left back of three back defense from 1997. In October 1998, he moved to Consadole Sapporo. However the club was relegated to J2 League end of 1998 season. He could not play at all in the match in 1999 and he retired at the end of the 1999 season.

== Career statistics ==
Appearances and goals by club, season and competition
Club	Season	League			Emperor's Cup		J.League Cup		Total	
Club	Season	Division	Apps	Goals	Apps	Goals	Apps	Goals	Apps	Goals
Gamba Osaka	1993	J1 League	4	0	0	0	2	0	6	0
Gamba Osaka	1994	J1 League	7	0	2	0	0	0	9	0
Gamba Osaka	1995	J1 League	0	0	0	0	—		0	0
Yokohama Flügels	1996	J1 League	2	0	2	0	0	0	4	0
Yokohama Flügels	1997	J1 League	18	2	2	0	0	0	20	2
Yokohama Flügels	1998	J1 League	8	0	0	0	0	0	8	0
Consadole Sapporo	1998	J1 League	3	0	3	0	0	0	6	0
Consadole Sapporo	1999	J2 League	2	0	0	0	0	0	2	0
Career total			44	2	9	0	2	0	55	2
