= Takahiro Okubo =

Japanese footballer and manager

Takahiro Okubo 大久保 貴広
Personal information
- Full name: Takahiro Okubo
- Date of birth: April 29, 1974 (age 52)
- Place of birth: Shizuoka, Japan
- Height: 1.66 m (5 ft 5 1/2 in)
- Position: Midfielder

Youth career
- 1990–1992: Hamamatsu Minami High School
- 1993–1996: Shizuoka University

Senior career*
Years	Team	Apps	(Gls)
1997–1998	Yokohama Flügels	7	(0)
1999–2001	Honda	71	(10)
Total		78	(10)

Managerial career
- 2010–2011: Honda
Medal record
Yokohama Flügels
Winner	Emperor's Cup	1998
Runner-up	Emperor's Cup	1997
- * Club domestic league appearances and goals

Takahiro Okubo (大久保 貴広, Okubo Takahiro; born April 29, 1974) is a former Japanese football player and manager.

== Playing career ==
Okubo was born in "Shizuoka Prefecture" on April 29, 1974. After graduating from Shizuoka University, he joined J1 League club Yokohama Flügels in 1997. Although he played several matches until 1998 season, the club was disbanded end of 1998 season due to financial strain. In 1999, he moved to Japan Football League club Honda. He played as regular player and the club won the 2nd place 1999, 2000 Japan Football League and the champions 2001 Japan Football League. He retired end of 2001 season.

== Coaching career ==
After retirement, Okubo started coaching career at Honda. he served as coach until 2009. In 2010, he became a manager and managed the club in 2 seasons until 2011.

== Career statistics ==
Appearances and goals by club, season and competition
Club	Season	League			Emperor's Cup		J.League Cup		Total	
Club	Season	Division	Apps	Goals	Apps	Goals	Apps	Goals	Apps	Goals
Yokohama Flügels	1997	J1 League	2	0	0	0	0	0	2	0
Yokohama Flügels	1998	J1 League	5	0	0	0	0	0	5	0
Honda	1999	Football League	24	3	3	0	—		27	3
Honda	2000	Football League	21	5	3	0	—		24	5
Honda	2001	Football League	26	2	1	0	—		27	2
Career total			78	10	7	0	0	0	85	0
