= Haruki Seto =

Japanese footballer (born 1978)

Haruki Seto 瀬戸 春樹
Personal information
- Full name: Haruki Seto
- Date of birth: March 14, 1978 (age 48)
- Place of birth: Toyama, Japan
- Height: 1.80 m (5 ft 11 in)
- Position: Midfielder

Youth career
- 1993–1995: Mizuhashi High School

Senior career*
Years	Team	Apps	(Gls)
1996–1998	Yokohama Flügels	27	(0)
1999	Albirex Niigata	36	(5)
2000	Oita Trinita	21	(1)
2001	Consadole Sapporo	2	(0)
2001	Gamba Osaka	0	(0)
2002–2004	Oita Trinita	55	(1)
2005	JEF United Chiba	0	(0)
2006	Kashiwa Reysol	6	(0)
2007	YKK AP	6	(0)
2008	Balestier Khalsa	30	(3)
2009	Geylang United	31	(2)
Total		214	(12)
Medal record
Yokohama Flügels
Winner	Emperor's Cup	1998
Runner-up	Emperor's Cup	1997
JEF United Chiba
Winner	J.League Cup	2005
- * Club domestic league appearances and goals

Haruki Seto (瀬戸 春樹, Seto Haruki; born March 14, 1978) is a former Japanese football player.

== Playing career ==
=== In Japan ===
Seto was born in Toyama Prefecture on March 14, 1978. After graduating from high school, he joined J1 League club Yokohama Flügels in 1996. He debuted in 1997 and played many matches as defensive midfielder during the club's 1998 Emperor's Cup championship winning season. However the club was disbanded end of 1998 season due to financial strain and he moved to the newly promoted J2 League club, Albirex Niigata in 1999. He became a regular player and appeared in all matches of the 1999 season. In 2000, he moved to J2 club Oita Trinita and he played many matches. In 2001, he moved to Consadole Sapporo. However he could hardly play in the match. In July 2001, he moved to Gamba Osaka. However he could not play at all in the match. In 2002, he returned to Oita Trinita and helped the team promote to J1 League, and was also selected to the J.League All Star. He stayed there until 2005, when he joined JEF United Chiba, and in 2006 he transferred to Kashiwa Reysol. In 2007, he returned to his hometown Toyama and joined YKK AP (Now part of the merged J2 League side Kataller Toyama) in the Japan Football League (JFL).

=== In Singapore ===
In 2008, he moved to Singapore's S.League side Balestier Khalsa and was made the club captain. In the following year he left the club and joined another S.League side Geylang United and won the Singapore Cup.

== Club statistics ==
Club performance			League		Cup		League Cup		Total	
Season	Club	League	Apps	Goals	Apps	Goals	Apps	Goals	Apps	Goals
Japan			League		Emperor's Cup		J.League Cup		Total	
1996	Yokohama Flügels	J1 League	0	0	0	0	0	0	0	0
1997	Yokohama Flügels	J1 League	7	0	1	0	1	0	9	0
1998	Yokohama Flügels	J1 League	20	0	3	0	4	1	27	1
1999	Albirex Niigata	J2 League	36	5	3	1	2	0	41	6
2000	Oita Trinita	J2 League	21	1	2	1	2	0	25	2
2001	Consadole Sapporo	J1 League	2	0	0	0	2	0	4	0
2001	Gamba Osaka	J1 League	0	0	0	0	0	0	0	0
2002	Oita Trinita	J2 League	24	1	4	0	-		28	1
2003	Oita Trinita	J1 League	14	0	1	0	3	0	18	0
2004	Oita Trinita	J1 League	17	0	1	0	5	0	23	0
2005	JEF United Chiba	J1 League	0	0	0	0	0	0	0	0
2006	Kashiwa Reysol	J2 League	6	0	0	0	-		6	0
2007	YKK AP	Football League	6	0	-		-		6	0
Singapore			League		Singapore Cup		League Cup		Total	
2008	Balestier Khalsa	S.League	30	3	1	0	6	0	37	3
2009	Geylang United	S.League	31	2	3	0	6	0	40	2
Country	Japan		153	7	15	2	19	1	187	10
Country	Singapore		61	5	4	0	12	0	77	5
Total			214	12	19	2	31	1	264	15

== Personal Honors ==
- 2009 Singapore National Team vs S League International Player All Star Team (member)
- 2008 Captain – Balestier Khalsa
- 2004 J.League All- Star game

== Team Honors ==
- 2009 SINGAPORE CUP (Champion)
- 2005 J.League Cup (Champion)
- 1998 Emperor's Cup (Champion)
