= Hiroki Hattori =

Japanese footballer and manager

Hiroki Hattori 服部 浩紀
Personal information
- Full name: Hiroki Hattori
- Date of birth: August 30, 1971 (age 55)
- Place of birth: Maebashi, Gunma, Japan
- Height: 1.80 m (5 ft 11 in)
- Position: Forward

Youth career
- 1987–1989: Maebashi Commercial High School

College career
Years	Team	Apps	(Gls)
1990–1993	University of Tsukuba		

Senior career*
Years	Team	Apps	(Gls)
1994–1998	Yokohama Flügels	111	(20)
1998	Kawasaki Frontale	12	(1)
1999	Shimizu S-Pulse	10	(1)
2000	Albirex Niigata	17	(2)
2000–2002	Avispa Fukuoka	37	(4)
2003	Sagan Tosu	49	(6)
Total		236	(34)

Managerial career
- 2015–2016: Thespakusatsu Gunma
Medal record
Yokohama Flügels
Winner	Emperor's Cup	1998
Runner-up	Emperor's Cup	1997
Shimizu S-Pulse
Runner-up	J1 League	1999
- * Club domestic league appearances and goals

Hiroki Hattori (服部 浩紀, Hattori Hiroki; born August 30, 1971) is a former Japanese football player and manager.

== Playing career ==
Hattori was born in Maebashi on August 30, 1971. After graduating from the University of Tsukuba, he joined Yokohama Flügels in 1994. He played many matches from first season and the club won the 1994–95 Asian Cup Winners' Cup. In 1997, he became a regular forward and scored 11 goals. In the 1997 Emperor's Cup, he scored 4 goals and the club finished in 2nd place. In July 1998, he moved to Japan Football League club Kawasaki Frontale. In 1999, he moved to Shimizu S-Pulse. However he could hardly play in the match. In 2000, he moved to J2 League club Albirex Niigata and he played many matches. In June 2000, he moved to Avispa Fukuoka. Although he played many matches, the club was relegated to J2 from 2002. In 2003, he moved to J2 club Sagan Tosu. He retired at the end of the 2003 season.

== Coaching career ==
In 2015, Hattori became a manager for J2 League club Thespakusatsu Gunma. However, due to poor results, he resigned at the end of the 2016 season.

== Career statistics ==
Appearances and goals by club, season and competition
Club	Season	League			Emperor's Cup		J.League Cup		Total	
Club	Season	Division	Apps	Goals	Apps	Goals	Apps	Goals	Apps	Goals
Yokohama Flügels	1994	J1 League	26	1	1	0	2	0	29	1
Yokohama Flügels	1995	J1 League	23	3	0	0	-		23	3
Yokohama Flügels	1996	J1 League	22	4	1	0	13	2	36	6
Yokohama Flügels	1997	J1 League	29	11	5	4	8	1	42	16
Yokohama Flügels	1998	J1 League	11	1	0	0	2	0	13	1
Kawasaki Frontale	1998	Football League	12	1	0	0	2	0	14	1
Shimizu S-Pulse	1999	J1 League	10	1	0	0	0	0	10	1
Albirex Niigata	2000	J2 League	17	2	0	0	1	0	18	2
Avispa Fukuoka	2000	J1 League	12	2	2	1	1	1	15	4
Avispa Fukuoka	2001	J1 League	25	2	1	0	2	0	28	2
Avispa Fukuoka	2002	J2 League	20	4	0	0	-		20	4
Sagan Tosu	2003	J2 League	29	2	0	0	-		29	2
Career total			236	34	10	5	31	4	277	43

== Managerial statistics ==
Team	From	To	Record				
Team	From	To	G	W	D	L	Win %
Thespakusatsu Gunma	2015	2016	84	24	21	39	28.57
Total			84	24	21	39	28.57
