= Kazuki Sato =

Kazuki Sato can refer to:

- Kazuki Sato (footballer, born 1974) (佐藤 一樹), Japanese footballer
- Kazuki Sato (footballer, born 1993) (佐藤 和樹), Japanese footballer
