= 1997 J.League =

5th season of J1 League

J.League
- Season: 1997
- Teams: 17
- Champions: Júbilo Iwata; 1st J.League title 2nd Japanese title
- Asian Club Championship: Júbilo Iwata
- Matches: 272
- Goals: 898 (3.3 per match)
- Top goalscorer: Patrick Mboma (25 goals)
- Highest attendance: 38,707 - Reds vs. Sanfrecce (April 19)
- Lowest attendance: 2,245 - JEF Utd. vs. Sanfrecce (May 7)
- Average attendance: 10,131

The 1997 J.League season was the fifth season of the J.League. The league began in April 12 and ended in December 13. For this year, the league was contested by 17 teams. Kashima Antlers won the first stage and Júbilo Iwata won the second stage. Júbilo Iwata won the J.League title after winning both matches in the Suntory Championship.

== Clubs ==
The following 17 clubs participated in J.League during the 1997 season. Of these clubs, Vissel Kobe was the only newly promoted team from Japan Football League.

- Avispa Fukuoka
- Bellmare Hiratsuka
- Cerezo Osaka
- Gamba Osaka
- JEF United Ichihara
- Júbilo Iwata
- Kashima Antlers
- Kashiwa Reysol
- Kyoto Purple Sanga
- Nagoya Grampus Eight
- Sanfrecce Hiroshima
- Shimizu S-Pulse
- Urawa Red Diamonds
- Verdy Kawasaki
- Vissel Kobe
- Yokohama Flügels
- Yokohama Marinos

=== Personnel ===
Club	Head coach
Avispa Fukuoka	(Argentina) Carlos Pachamé
Bellmare Hiratsuka	(Japan) Shigeharu Ueki
Cerezo Osaka	(Brazil) Levir Culpi
Gamba Osaka	(Croatia) Josip Kuže
JEF United Ichihara	(Netherlands) Jan Versleijen
Júbilo Iwata	(Japan) Takashi Kuwahara
Kashima Antlers	(Brazil) João Carlos
Kashiwa Reysol	(Brazil) Nicanor de Carvalho
Kyoto Purple Sanga	(Uruguay) Pedro Rocha
Nagoya Grampus Eight	(Portugal) Carlos Queiroz
Sanfrecce Hiroshima	(Scotland) Eddie Thomson
Shimizu S-Pulse	(Argentina) Osvaldo Ardiles
Urawa Red Diamonds	(Germany) Horst Köppel
Verdy Kawasaki	(Brazil) Valdir Espinosa
Vissel Kobe	(Scotland) Stuart Baxter
Yokohama Flügels	(Brazil) Otacílio Gonçalves
Yokohama Marinos	(Spain) Xabier Azkargorta

=== Foreign players ===
Club	Player 1	Player 2	Player 3	Player 4	Non-visa foreign	Former players
Avispa Fukuoka	(Argentina) Marcelo Carracedo	(Argentina) Sergio Vázquez	(Nigeria) Michael Obiku	(Spain) Pablo Maqueda		(Argentina) Julio Hernán Rossi (Argentina) Rodrigo Riep
Bellmare Hiratsuka	(Brazil) Cláudio	(Brazil) Simão	(South Korea) Hong Myung-bo			(Brazil) Wagner Lopes
Cerezo Osaka	(Brazil) Alex Lopes	(Brazil) Claudinho	(Brazil) Jean Elias	(South Korea) Ko Jeong-woon		(Brazil) Gilmar (Brazil) Sérgio Manoel
Gamba Osaka	(Cameroon) Patrick Mboma	(Federal Republic of Yugoslavia) Nebojša Krupniković	(North Macedonia) Boban Babunski	(Slovenia) Amir Karić		(Croatia) Mladen Mladenović
JEF United Ichihara	(Federal Republic of Yugoslavia) Nenad Maslovar	(Netherlands) Arnold Scholten	(Netherlands) Peter Bosz			(Federal Republic of Yugoslavia) Rade Bogdanović
Júbilo Iwata	(Brazil) Adilson Batista	(Brazil) Alessandro Cambalhota	(Brazil) Dunga			(Brazil) Marcelo Mabilia (Italy) Salvatore Schillaci
Kashima Antlers	(Brazil) Bismarck	(Brazil) Jorginho	(Brazil) Mazinho	(Brazil) Rodrigo Mendes		
Kashiwa Reysol	(Brazil) Edílson	(Brazil) Elpídio Silva	(Brazil) Paulo Jamelli	(Brazil) Valdir		(Brazil) Antônio Carlos Zago
Kyoto Purple Sanga	(Brazil) Capone	(Brazil) Daniel	(Brazil) Luiz Carlos	(Brazil) Mineiro		(Brazil) Cléber Arado (Brazil) Edmílson Matias
Nagoya Grampus Eight	(Brazil) Alexandre Torres	(Brazil) Ricardinho	(Brazil) Valdo	(Federal Republic of Yugoslavia) Dragan Stojković		
Sanfrecce Hiroshima	(Australia) Graham Arnold	(Australia) Tony Popovic	(England) Ian Crook	(South Korea) Noh Jung-yoon		(Brazil) Antônio Carlos
Shimizu S-Pulse	(Argentina) Fernando Oliva	(Brazil) Santos			(Brazil) Alex	(Wales) Mark Bowen
Urawa Red Diamonds	(Federal Republic of Yugoslavia) Željko Petrović	(Germany) Guido Buchwald	(Netherlands) Alfred Nijhuis	(Spain) Txiki Begiristain		(Austria) Michael Baur (France) Basile Boli
Verdy Kawasaki	(Brazil) Alcindo	(Brazil) Argel Fuchs	(Brazil) Dias	(Brazil) Magrão	(Bolivia) Ko Ishikawa	
Vissel Kobe	(Australia) Matthew Bingley	(Federal Republic of Yugoslavia) Budimir Vujačić	(Scotland) Lee Baxter		(Ghana) Michael Yano (South Korea) Cho Kwi-jae	(Denmark) Michael Laudrup (Switzerland) Thomas Bickel (Tunisia) Ziad Tlemçani
Yokohama Flügels	(Brazil) César Sampaio	(Brazil) Fernando Rech	(Brazil) Válber	(Cameroon) Cyrille Ndongo-Keller		(Brazil) Anderson Gils (Brazil) Marcelo (Brazil) Zinho
Yokohama Marinos	(Bolivia) Julio César Baldivieso	(Federal Republic of Yugoslavia) Dušan Petković	(Spain) Julio Salinas			

== Standings ==
=== First stage ===
Pos	Team	Pld	W	OTW	PKW	OTL	PKL	L	GF	GA	GD	Pts
1	(Ibaraki Prefecture) Kashima Antlers	16	12	0	1	0	0	3	32	15	+17	37
2	(Kanagawa Prefecture) Yokohama Flügels	16	11	1	0	0	0	4	35	16	+19	35
3	(Chiba Prefecture) Kashiwa Reysol	16	10	1	0	1	1	3	34	18	+16	32
4	(Kanagawa Prefecture) Bellmare Hiratsuka	16	8	2	0	0	0	6	25	20	+5	28
5	(Kanagawa Prefecture) Yokohama Marinos	16	7	3	1	0	0	5	31	31	0	28
6	(Shizuoka Prefecture) Júbilo Iwata	16	8	1	0	3	0	4	32	21	+11	26
7	(Shizuoka Prefecture) Shimizu S-Pulse	16	7	2	0	2	0	5	25	24	+1	25
8	(Osaka Prefecture) Gamba Osaka	16	8	0	0	0	0	8	28	23	+5	24
9	(Saitama Prefecture) Urawa Red Diamonds	16	6	1	1	0	0	8	25	24	+1	21
10	(Hiroshima Prefecture) Sanfrecce Hiroshima	16	6	1	1	2	0	6	22	23	−1	21
11	(Osaka Prefecture) Cerezo Osaka	16	6	0	1	2	1	6	21	26	−5	19
12	(Aichi Prefecture) Nagoya Grampus Eight	16	6	0	0	1	0	9	18	24	−6	18
13	(Kyoto Prefecture) Kyoto Purple Sanga	16	6	0	0	1	1	8	19	32	−13	18
14	(Hyōgo Prefecture) Vissel Kobe	16	5	1	0	2	0	8	24	34	−10	17
15	(Chiba Prefecture) JEF United Ichihara	16	3	2	0	0	0	11	21	34	−13	13
16	(Tokyo) Verdy Kawasaki	16	2	2	0	1	2	9	16	27	−11	10
17	(Fukuoka Prefecture) Avispa Fukuoka	16	3	0	0	2	0	11	11	27	−16	9

Source: RSSSF

=== Second stage ===
Pos	Team	Pld	W	OTW	PKW	OTL	PKL	L	GF	GA	GD	Pts
1	Júbilo Iwata	16	12	2	0	0	0	2	40	14	+26	40
2	Gamba Osaka	16	10	2	0	1	0	3	38	23	+15	34
3	Yokohama Marinos	16	8	4	0	0	0	4	42	28	+14	32
4	Kashima Antlers	16	9	2	0	1	0	4	46	23	+23	31
5	Nagoya Grampus Eight	16	10	0	0	0	0	6	23	24	−1	30
6	Shimizu S-Pulse	16	9	1	0	3	0	3	27	16	+11	29
7	Urawa Red Diamonds	16	8	1	0	2	0	5	26	21	+5	26
8	Cerezo Osaka	16	7	1	1	3	0	4	32	30	+2	24
9	Bellmare Hiratsuka	16	6	1	1	1	1	6	30	32	−2	21
10	Kashiwa Reysol	16	6	1	0	0	1	8	29	31	−2	20
11	Yokohama Flügels	16	5	1	1	2	0	7	23	27	−4	18
12	Verdy Kawasaki	16	4	2	0	0	0	10	22	38	−16	16
13	Sanfrecce Hiroshima	16	5	0	0	2	0	9	21	27	−6	15
14	JEF United Ichihara	16	3	3	0	3	1	6	22	32	−10	15
15	Avispa Fukuoka	16	3	0	1	3	0	9	18	31	−13	10
16	Kyoto Purple Sanga	16	3	0	0	2	1	10	21	38	−17	9
17	Vissel Kobe	16	1	2	0	0	0	13	19	44	−25	7

Source: RSSSF

Key

- PLD = Games Played
- W = Games Won - 3 points for a win
- OTW = Games won in overtime - 2 points for overtime win
- PKW = Games won by penalty kicks after overtime played - 1 point for a win
- OTL = Games lost in overtime - zero points for overtime loss
- PKL = Games lost by penalty kicks after overtime played - zero points for a penalty loss
- GF = Goals scored for
- GA = Goals conceded
- GD = Goal difference - GF - GA = GD

=== Suntory Championship ===
December 6, 1997
15:03

Júbilo Iwata	3 – 2	Kashima Antlers
Nakayama 1', 46'; Shimizu 119'		Bismarck 62'; Mazinho 88'

Yamaha Stadium, Iwata
Attendance: 17,269
Referee: Masayoshi Okada

December 13, 1997
19:36

Kashima Antlers	0 – 1	Júbilo Iwata
		Nakayama 81'

Kashima Soccer Stadium, Kashima
Attendance: 15,276
Referee: Leslie Mottram

== Top scorers ==
Rank	Scorer	Club	Goals
1	(Cameroon) Patrick Mboma	Gamba Osaka	25
2	(Brazil) Edílson	Kashiwa Reysol	23
3	(Brazil) Mazinho	Kashima Antlers	22
3	(Japan) Akihiro Nagashima	Vissel Kobe	22
5	(Japan) Masahiro Fukuda	Urawa Red Diamonds	21
5	(Spain) Julio Salinas	Yokohama Marinos	21
7	(Brazil) Válber	Yokohama Flügels	20
8	(Japan) Masashi Nakayama	Júbilo Iwata	18
8	(Japan) Wagner Lopes	Bellmare Hiratsuka	18
10	(Brazil) Paulo Jamelli	Kashiwa Reysol	14

Source: RSSSF

== Awards ==
=== Individual awards ===
Award	Recipient	Club
Most Valuable Player	(Brazil) Dunga	Júbilo Iwata
Rookie of the Year	(Japan) Atsushi Yanagisawa	Kashima Antlers
Manager of the Year	(Brazil) João Carlos	Kashima Antlers
Top Scorer	(Cameroon) Patrick Mboma	Gamba Osaka

Source: J.LEAGUE Digital Data Book

=== Best Eleven ===
Pos	Footballer	Club	Nationality
GK	Tomoaki Ogami	Júbilo Iwata	Japan
DF	Masami Ihara	Yokohama Marinos	Japan
DF	Naoki Soma	Kashima Antlers	Japan
DF	Yutaka Akita	Kashima Antlers	Japan
MF	Bismarck	Kashima Antlers	Brazil
MF	Dunga	Júbilo Iwata	Brazil
MF	Hidetoshi Nakata	Bellmare Hiratsuka	Japan
MF	Hiroshi Nanami	Júbilo Iwata	Japan
MF	Motohiro Yamaguchi	Yokohama Flügels	Japan
FW	Patrick Mboma	Gamba Osaka	Cameroon
FW	Masashi Nakayama	Júbilo Iwata	Japan

Source: J.LEAGUE Digital Data Book
