= Naoto Otake =

Japanese footballer and manager

Naoto Otake 大嶽 直人
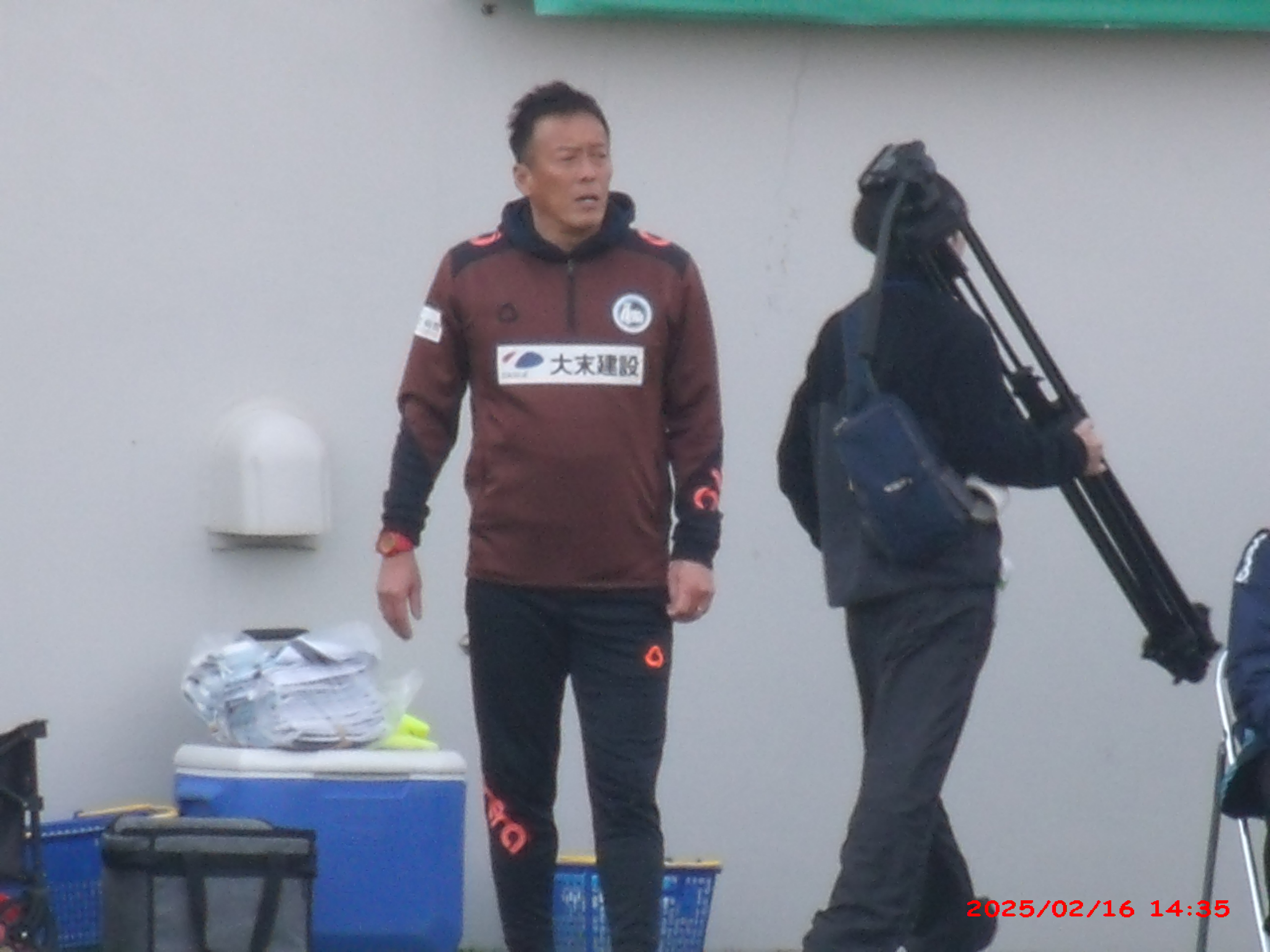
- Ohtake in 2025.

Personal information
- Full name: Naoto Otake
- Date of birth: 18 October 1968 (age 58)
- Place of birth: Shizuoka, Shizuoka, Japan
- Height: 1.78 m (5 ft 10 in)
- Position: Defender

Team information
- Current team: Kamatamare Sanuki (manager)

Youth career
- 1984–1986: Tokai University Daiichi High School

College career
Years	Team	Apps	(Gls)
1987–1990	Juntendo University		

Senior career*
Years	Team	Apps	(Gls)
1991–1997	Yokohama Flügels	188	(2)
1998–2001	Kyoto Purple Sanga	99	(3)
Total		287	(5)

International career
1994	Japan	1	(0)

Managerial career
- 2010–2012: Iga FC Kunoichi
- 2018–2021: Iga FC Kunoichi
- 2022–2023: Kagoshima United
- 2024–2025: FC Osaka
- 2026–: Kamatamare Sanuki
Medal record
Yokohama Flügels
Winner	Emperor's Cup	1993
Runner-up	Emperor's Cup	1997
Representing Japan
AFC Asian Cup
Gold medal – first place	1992 Japan
- * Club domestic league appearances and goals

Naoto Otake (大嶽 直人, Ōtake Naoto; born October 18, 1968) is a former Japanese football player and manager. He played for Japan national team. He was recently the manager of J3 League club, FC Osaka. His younger brother Masato was also a footballer.

== Club career ==
Otake was educated at and played for Tokai University Daiichi High School and Juntendo University. After leaving the university, he joined the Japan Soccer League side All Nippon Airways in 1991. When Japan's first-ever professional league J1 League started in 1993, All Nippon Airways was transformed to Yokohama Flügels for whom he continued to play. The club won 1993 Emperor's Cup their first time in major title. In Asia, the club also won 1994–95 Asian Cup Winners' Cup. He moved to Kyoto Purple Sanga at the beginning of 1998 season and retired from the game as a Sanga player in 2001.

== National team career ==
He was capped once for the Japan national team when he played in a friendly against Australia on September 27, 1994 at the Tokyo National Stadium. He was also a member of the Japan team that won the 1992 Asian Cup but did not play in the tournament.

== Coaching career ==
After retirement, Otake started coaching career at Kyoto Purple Sanga (later Kyoto Sanga FC) in 2002. Through Yokohama F. Marinos coach, He signed with L.League club Iga FC Kunoichi in 2010 and became a manager. He managed until 2012. In 2013, he moved to Giravanz Kitakyushu and coached until 2015. He returned to Kyoto Sanga FC in 2016 and coached until 2017. In 2018, he became a manager for Iga FC Kunoichi again.

In 2022, he became a manager for J3 club, Kagoshima United.

On 12 December 2023, Otake announcement officially manager of FC Osaka from 2024 season.

== Club statistics ==
Appearances and goals by club, season and competition
Club	Season	League			Emperor's Cup		J. League Cup		Total	
Club	Season	Division	Apps	Goals	Apps	Goals	Apps	Goals	Apps	Goals
All Nippon Airways	1990–91	JSL Division 1	1	0	0	0	0	0	1	0
All Nippon Airways	1991–92	JSL Division 1	21	1			1	0	22	1
Yokohama Flügels	1992	J1 League	-				8	1	8	1
Yokohama Flügels	1993	J1 League	33	0	5	0	0	0	38	0
Yokohama Flügels	1994	J1 League	40	1	2	0	2	0	44	1
Yokohama Flügels	1995	J1 League	39	0	2	0	-		41	0
Yokohama Flügels	1996	J1 League	30	0	2	0	14	0	46	0
Yokohama Flügels	1997	J1 League	24	0	0	0	10	0	34	0
Kyoto Purple Sanga	1998	J1 League	31	1	2	0	4	0	37	1
Kyoto Purple Sanga	1999	J1 League	27	0	2	0	3	0	32	0
Kyoto Purple Sanga	2000	J1 League	23	0	1	0	7	0	31	0
Kyoto Purple Sanga	2001	J2 League	18	2	0	0	1	0	19	2
Total			287	5	16	0	50	1	353	6

== National team statistics ==
Japan national team
Year	Apps	Goals
1994	1	0
Total	1	0

== Honours and awards ==
=== Team honours ===
- 1992 Asian Cup (Champions)
