= Jin Sato =

Jin Sato may refer to:

- Jin Sato (footballer) (佐藤 尽, born 1974), Japanese footballer
- Jin Sato (actor) (佐藤 汛, born 1984), stage name of Yuki Sato, Japanese actor
