= 1998 Yokohama Flügels season =

Yokohama Flügels
1998 season
- Manager: Rexach; Engels
- Stadium: International Stadium Yokohama
- J.League: 7th
- Emperor's Cup: Champions
- J.League Cup: GL-C 4th
- Top goalscorer: Lediakhov (15)
Home colours	Away colours

1998 Yokohama Flügels season

== Competitions ==
Competitions	Position
J.League	7th / 18 clubs
Emperor's Cup	Champions
J.League Cup	GL-C 4th / 5 clubs

== Domestic results ==
=== J.League ===
21 March 1998 1–1	Yokohama Marinos	1–2 (GG) (a.e.t.)	Yokohama Flügels	International Stadium Yokohama
JST (UTC+09)

25 March 1998 1–2	Yokohama Flügels	0–2	Urawa Red Diamonds	International Stadium Yokohama
JST (UTC+09)

28 March 1998 1–3	Nagoya Grampus Eight	2–1	Yokohama Flügels	Mizuho Athletic Stadium
JST (UTC+09)

4 April 1998 1–4	Yokohama Flügels	1–3	Bellmare Hiratsuka	International Stadium Yokohama
JST (UTC+09)

11 April 1998 1–5	Júbilo Iwata	4–0	Yokohama Flügels	Júbilo Iwata Stadium
JST (UTC+09)

15 April 1998 1–6	Yokohama Flügels	0–3	Verdy Kawasaki	Yokohama Mitsuzawa Stadium
JST (UTC+09)

18 April 1998 1–7	Vissel Kobe	1–4	Yokohama Flügels	Kobe Universiade Memorial Stadium
JST (UTC+09)

25 April 1998 1–8	Yokohama Flügels	2–0	JEF United Ichihara	Yokohama Mitsuzawa Stadium
JST (UTC+09)

29 April 1998 1–9	Kyoto Purple Sanga	1–2 (GG) (a.e.t.)	Yokohama Flügels	Nishikyogoku Athletic Stadium
JST (UTC+09)

2 May 1998 1–10	Cerezo Osaka	1–4	Yokohama Flügels	Osaka Nagai Stadium
JST (UTC+09)

5 May 1998 1–11	Yokohama Flügels	5–1	Sanfrecce Hiroshima	International Stadium Yokohama
JST (UTC+09)

9 May 1998 1–12	Avispa Fukuoka	0–1	Yokohama Flügels	Hakatanomori Football Stadium
JST (UTC+09)

25 July 1998 1–13	Yokohama Flügels	2–2 (GG) (a.e.t.) (5–3 p)	Consadole Sapporo	Hakatanomori Football Stadium
JST (UTC+09)

29 July 1998 1–14	Shimizu S-Pulse	2–0	Yokohama Flügels	Nihondaira Sports Stadium
JST (UTC+09)

1 August 1998 1–15	Yokohama Flügels	3–2	Kashima Antlers	International Stadium Yokohama
JST (UTC+09)

5 August 1998 1–16	Kashiwa Reysol	1–3	Yokohama Flügels	Hitachi Kashiwa Soccer Stadium
JST (UTC+09)

8 August 1998 1–17	Yokohama Flügels	3–6	Gamba Osaka	Yokohama Mitsuzawa Stadium
JST (UTC+09)

22 August 1998 2–1	Yokohama Flügels	2–4	Shimizu S-Pulse	International Stadium Yokohama
JST (UTC+09)

29 August 1998 2–2	Kashima Antlers	1–3	Yokohama Flügels	Kashima Soccer Stadium
JST (UTC+09)

5 September 1998 2–3	Yokohama Flügels	1–2	Kashiwa Reysol	International Stadium Yokohama
JST (UTC+09)

12 September 1998 2–4	Gamba Osaka	1–1 (GG) (a.e.t.) (1–4 p)	Yokohama Flügels	Osaka Expo '70 Stadium
JST (UTC+09)

15 September 1998 2–5	Yokohama Flügels	0–2	Yokohama Marinos	International Stadium Yokohama
JST (UTC+09)

19 September 1998 2–6	Urawa Red Diamonds	3–0	Yokohama Flügels	Urawa Komaba Stadium
JST (UTC+09)

23 September 1998 2–7	Yokohama Flügels	2–3	Nagoya Grampus Eight	International Stadium Yokohama
JST (UTC+09)

26 September 1998 2–8	Bellmare Hiratsuka	3–1	Yokohama Flügels	Tokyo National Stadium
JST (UTC+09)

3 October 1998 2–9	Yokohama Flügels	0–4	Júbilo Iwata	Yokohama Mitsuzawa Stadium
JST (UTC+09)

14 October 1998 2–10	Verdy Kawasaki	0–3	Yokohama Flügels	Tokyo National Stadium
JST (UTC+09)

17 October 1998 2–11	Yokohama Flügels	4–3	Vissel Kobe	Yokohama Mitsuzawa Stadium
JST (UTC+09)

21 October 1998 2–12	JEF United Ichihara	0–3	Yokohama Flügels	Ichihara Seaside Stadium
JST (UTC+09)

24 October 1998 2–13	Yokohama Flügels	2–3	Kyoto Purple Sanga	Kagoshima Kamoike Stadium
JST (UTC+09)

31 October 1998 2–14	Yokohama Flügels	7–0	Cerezo Osaka	International Stadium Yokohama
JST (UTC+09)

3 November 1998 2–15	Sanfrecce Hiroshima	1–2	Yokohama Flügels	Hiroshima Big Arch
JST (UTC+09)

7 November 1998 2–16	Yokohama Flügels	2–1	Avispa Fukuoka	Yokohama Mitsuzawa Stadium
JST (UTC+09)

14 November 1998 2–17	Consadole Sapporo	1–4	Yokohama Flügels	Sapporo Atsubetsu Park Stadium
JST (UTC+09)

=== Emperor's Cup ===
1st Round	bye

2nd Round	bye

13 December 1998 3rd Round	Yokohama Flügels	4–2	Otsuka Pharmaceutical	Hakatanomori Football Stadium
JST (UTC+09)

20 December 1998 4th Round	Ventforet Kofu	0–3	Yokohama Flügels	Tottori Soccer Stadium
JST (UTC+09)

23 December 1998 Quarterfinals	Júbilo Iwata	1–2	Yokohama Flügels	Kobe Universiade Memorial Stadium
JST (UTC+09)

27 December 1998 Semifinals	Yokohama Flügels	1–0	Kashima Antlers	Osaka Nagai Stadium
JST (UTC+09)

1 January 1999 Final	Yokohama Flügels	2–1	Shimizu S-Pulse	Tokyo National Stadium
JST (UTC+09)

=== J.League Cup ===
16 May 1998 GL-C-1	Yokohama Flügels	0–2	Gamba Osaka	Yokohama Mitsuzawa Stadium
JST (UTC+09)

GL-C-2	bye

30 May 1998 GL-C-3	Consadole Sapporo	3–2	Yokohama Flügels	Muroran Irie Stadium
JST (UTC+09)

3 June 1998 GL-C-4	Kawasaki Frontale	0–1	Yokohama Flügels	Todoroki Athletics Stadium
JST (UTC+09)

6 June 1998 GL-C-5	Yokohama Flügels	2–3	Shimizu S-Pulse	Yokohama Mitsuzawa Stadium
JST (UTC+09)

== Player statistics ==
No.	Pos.	Nat.	Player	D.o.B. (Age)	Height / Weight	J.League		Emperor's Cup		J.League Cup		Total	
No.	Pos.	Nat.	Player	D.o.B. (Age)	Height / Weight	Apps	Goals	Apps	Goals	Apps	Goals	Apps	Goals
1	GK	(Japan)	Seigo Narazaki	April 15, 1976 (aged 21)	cm / kg	34	0						
2	MF	(Japan)	Kazuki Sato	June 27, 1974 (aged 23)	cm / kg	19	3						
3	DF	(Japan)	Norihiro Satsukawa	April 18, 1972 (aged 25)	cm / kg	32	0						
4	DF	(Japan)	Jin Sato	September 27, 1974 (aged 23)	cm / kg	14	1						
5	MF	(Japan)	Motohiro Yamaguchi	January 29, 1969 (aged 29)	cm / kg	34	7						
6	MF	(Japan)	Atsuhiro Miura	July 24, 1974 (aged 23)	cm / kg	32	10						
7	MF	(Japan)	Takeo Harada	October 2, 1971 (aged 26)	cm / kg	22	0						
8	MF	(Brazil)	César Sampaio	March 31, 1968 (aged 29)	cm / kg	28	2						
9	FW	(Japan)	Takayuki Yoshida	March 14, 1977 (aged 21)	cm / kg	20	5						
10	MF	(Japan)	Hideki Nagai	January 26, 1971 (aged 27)	cm / kg	32	12						
11	FW	(Japan)	Hiroki Hattori	August 30, 1971 (aged 26)	cm / kg	11	1						
12	DF	(Japan)	Yasuhiro Hato	May 4, 1976 (aged 21)	cm / kg	16	0						
13	DF	(Japan)	Koji Maeda	February 3, 1969 (aged 29)	cm / kg	24	1						
14	DF	(Japan)	Shoji Nonoshita	May 24, 1970 (aged 27)	cm / kg	8	0						
15	MF	(Japan)	Haruki Seto	March 14, 1978 (aged 20)	cm / kg	20	0						
16	GK	(Japan)	Hiroshi Sato	March 7, 1972 (aged 26)	cm / kg	0	0						
17	DF	(Japan)	Seiichiro Okuno	July 26, 1974 (aged 23)	cm / kg	3	0						
18	MF	(Japan)	Takahiro Okubo	April 29, 1974 (aged 23)	cm / kg	5	0						
19	FW	(Japan)	Takashi Sakurai	May 4, 1977 (aged 20)	cm / kg	1	0						
20	GK	(Japan)	Hiroyuki Nitao	November 27, 1973 (aged 24)	cm / kg	0	0						
21	GK	(Japan)	Yoshitaka Kishikawa	January 16, 1979 (aged 19)	cm / kg	0	0						
22	FW	(Japan)	Yoshikiyo Kuboyama	July 21, 1976 (aged 21)	cm / kg	10	3						
23	DF	(Japan)	Yuki Inoue	October 31, 1977 (aged 20)	cm / kg	9	0						
24	MF	(Japan)	Hideyuki Ujiie	February 23, 1979 (aged 19)	cm / kg	9	1						
25	DF	(Japan)	Shigeki Tsujimoto	June 23, 1979 (aged 18)	cm / kg	0	0						
26	DF	(Japan)	Kazuki Teshima	June 7, 1979 (aged 18)	cm / kg	0	0						
27	MF	(Japan)	Yasuhito Endō	January 28, 1980 (aged 18)	cm / kg	16	1						
28	FW	(Japan)	Hideo Ōshima	March 7, 1980 (aged 18)	cm / kg	6	0						
29	FW	(Brazil)	Anderson	February 15, 1977 (aged 21)	cm / kg	14	3						
30	FW	(Russia)	Igor Lediakhov	May 22, 1968 (aged 29)	cm / kg	23	15						
31	FW	(Portugal)	Paulo Futre	February 28, 1966 (aged 32)	cm / kg	13	3						

== Other pages ==
- (in Japanese) J.League official site
