= Takayuki Yoshida =

Japanese footballer and manager

Takayuki Yoshida 吉田 孝行
Personal information
- Full name: Takayuki Yoshida
- Date of birth: 14 March 1977 (age 49)
- Place of birth: Kawanishi, Hyogo, Japan
- Height: 1.74 m (5 ft 9 in)
- Positions: Forward; midfielder

Team information
- Current team: Shimizu S-Pulse (manager)

Youth career
- 1992–1994: Takigawa Daini High School

Senior career*
Years	Team	Apps	(Gls)
1995–1998	Yokohama Flügels	71	(9)
1999–2000	Yokohama F. Marinos	21	(2)
2000–2005	Oita Trinita	189	(44)
2006–2007	Yokohama F. Marinos	49	(4)
2008–2013	Vissel Kobe	140	(27)
Total		470	(86)

International career
1993	Japan U17	3	(0)

Managerial career
- 2015–2017: Vissel Kobe (assistant)
- 2017–2018: Vissel Kobe
- 2019: Vissel Kobe
- 2020–2021: V-Varen Nagasaki (assistant)
- 2021: V-Varen Nagasaki
- 2021–2022: V-Varen Nagasaki (assistant)
- 2022–2025: Vissel Kobe
- 2026–: Shimizu S-Pulse
- * Club domestic league appearances and goals

Takayuki Yoshida (吉田 孝行, Yoshida Takayuki; born 14 March 1977) is a former Japanese football player and manager. He is currently the manager of J1 League club Shimizu S-Pulse.

During his managerial tenure at Vissel Kobe, Yoshida has coached a number of former FIFA World Cup winners with the like of Lukas Podolski, Andrés Iniesta and David Villa. He also has coached a few world class superstars like Thomas Vermaelen, Sergi Samper and Juan Mata. Yoshida also guided Vissel Kobe to two consecutive J1 League title in 2023 and 2024.

== Club career ==
After graduating from high school, he joined Yokohama Flügels with teammate Yasuhiro Hato in 1995. He played many matches as forward from first season and the club won the 1994–95 Asian Cup Winners' Cup. In 1998, the club won Emperor's Cup. In the final, he scored the winning goal.

However the club was disbanded at the end of 1998 due to financial strain, he then moved to its merger club Yokohama F. Marinos. However his opportunity to play decreased and he moved to J.League Division 2 Oita Trinita in 2000. He played as offensive midfielder in many matches. The club won the championship in 2002 and was promoted to the first division. He returned to Yokohama F. Marinos in 2006. He moved to his local club Vissel Kobe in 2008. He played many matches until 2011. In 2012, he could not play for injury and the club was relegated to second division. Although he thought of retirement, he extended the contract a year. In 2013, the club finished second and was promoted to first division. He retired at the end of the season.

== National team career ==
In August 1993, Yoshida was selected Japan U-17 national team for the 1993 FIFA U-17 World Championship on home soil and he played 3 matches.

== Coaching career ==
After the retirement, Yoshida started coaching career at Vissel Kobe in 2015. He served as an assistant coach under head coach Nelsinho Baptista. In August 2017, Nelsinho was sacked for poor results and Yoshida became the club new head coach as Nelsinho successor. Although Vissel managed to signed a Germany former FIFA World Cup winner, Lukas Podolski in July 2017, Vissel finished at the 9th place in 2017 season. In 2018 season, Vissel gained another former Spanish FIFA World Cup winner, Andrés Iniesta in July and Vissel rose to the 4th place temporarily. However Vissel went down after that and Yoshida resigned in September when the club was at the 10th place. In April 2019, he became a manager again as Juan Manuel Lillo successor. However Vissel won only 1 match in 7 matches and he resigned in June.

== Club statistics ==
Club performance			League		Cup		League Cup		Total	
Season	Club	League	Apps	Goals	Apps	Goals	Apps	Goals	Apps	Goals
Japan			League		Emperor's Cup		League Cup		Total	
1995	Yokohama Flügels	J1 League	28	3	2	0	-		30	3
1996	Yokohama Flügels	J1 League	2	1	1	0	2	0	5	1
1997	Yokohama Flügels	J1 League	21	0	4	3	5	0	30	3
1998	Yokohama Flügels	J1 League	20	5	5	7	1	1	26	13
1999	Yokohama F. Marinos	J1 League	14	1	0	0	6	2	20	3
2000	Yokohama F. Marinos	J1 League	7	1	0	0	2	0	9	1
2000	Oita Trinita	J2 League	20	6	3	3	0	0	23	9
2001	Oita Trinita	J2 League	41	15	3	2	2	1	46	18
2002	Oita Trinita	J2 League	41	9	4	1	-		45	10
2003	Oita Trinita	J1 League	29	7	1	0	2	1	32	8
2004	Oita Trinita	J1 League	30	5	2	0	6	1	38	6
2005	Oita Trinita	J1 League	28	2	2	0	3	0	33	2
2006	Yokohama F. Marinos	J1 League	27	1	3	0	10	0	40	1
2007	Yokohama F. Marinos	J1 League	22	3	1	0	7	0	30	3
2008	Vissel Kobe	J1 League	30	5	2	1	6	1	38	7
2009	Vissel Kobe	J1 League	29	5	2	0	5	0	36	5
2010	Vissel Kobe	J1 League	21	4	2	1	4	2	27	7
2011	Vissel Kobe	J1 League	29	9	1	0	1	1	31	10
2012	Vissel Kobe	J1 League	19	1	0	0	2	0	21	1
2013	Vissel Kobe	J2 League	12	3	1	2	-		13	5
Career total			470	86	39	20	64	10	573	116

== Managerial statistics ==
As of 1 February 2026

Managerial record by team and tenure
Team	Nat.	From	To	Record					Ref.
Team	Nat.	From	To	G	W	D	L	Win %	Ref.
Vissel Kobe	(Japan)	16 August 2017	17 September 2018	54	21	13	20	38.89	
Vissel Kobe	(Japan)	17 April 2019	8 June 2019	10	1	1	8	10.00	
V-Varen Nagasaki	(Japan)	1 February 2021	3 May 2021	11	4	2	5	36.36	
Vissel Kobe	(Japan)	29 June 2022	31 January 2026	176	98	34	44	55.68	
Shimizu S-Pulse	(Japan)	1 February 2026	Present	0	0	0	0	—	
Career Total				251	124	50	77	49.40	

== Honours ==
=== Player ===
Yokohama Flügels

- Asian Cup Winners' Cup: 1994–95
- Emperor's Cup: 1998

Yokohama F. Marinos

- J.League Division 1: 2000

Oita Trinita

- J.League Division 2: 2002

=== Manager ===
Vissel Kobe

- J1 League: 2023, 2024
- Emperor's Cup: 2024
