= Takeo Harada =

Japanese footballer and manager

Takeo Harada 原田 武男
Personal information
- Full name: Takeo Harada
- Date of birth: October 2, 1971 (age 55)
- Place of birth: Kashima, Saga, Japan
- Height: 1.72 m (5 ft 8 in)
- Position: Midfielder

Youth career
- 1987–1989: Kunimi High School
- 1990–1993: Waseda University

Senior career*
Years	Team	Apps	(Gls)
1994–1998	Yokohama Flügels	107	(8)
1999–2000	Cerezo Osaka	41	(0)
2000	Kawasaki Frontale	15	(1)
2001	Oita Trinita	40	(0)
2002–2003	Avispa Fukuoka	49	(1)
2005–2010	V-Varen Nagasaki	94	(10)
Total		346	(20)

Managerial career
- 2017: Giravanz Kitakyushu
- 2022: V-Varen Nagasaki
Medal record
Yokohama Flügels
Winner	Emperor's Cup	1998
Runner-up	Emperor's Cup	1997
Kawasaki Frontale
Runner-up	J.League Cup	2000
- * Club domestic league appearances and goals

Takeo Harada (原田 武男, Harada Takeo; born October 2, 1971) is a former Japanese football player and manager.

== Playing career ==
Harada was born in Kashima on October 2, 1971. After graduating from Waseda University, he joined Yokohama Flügels in 1994. He became a regular player as defensive midfielder from first season and the club won the champions 1994–95 Asian Cup Winners' Cup. Although his opportunity to play decreased behind Motohiro Yamaguchi and César Sampaio from 1995, he played many matches as center back not only defensive midfielder from 1997. The club won the champions 1998 Emperor's Cup. However the club was disbanded end of 1998 season due to financial strain, he moved to Cerezo Osaka in 1999. He became a regular player as defensive midfielder. In June 2000, he moved to newly was promoted to J1 League club, Kawasaki Frontale. Although the club won the 2nd place 2000 J.League Cup, was relegated to J2 League. In 2001, he moved to J2 club Oita Trinita. In 2002, he moved to J2 club Avispa Fukuoka. Although he played many matches, he left the club end of 2003 season. After 1 season blank, he joined Regional Leagues club V-Varen Nagasaki. He played many matches every season and the club was promoted to Japan Football League from 2009. He retired end of 2010 season.

== Coaching career ==
After retirement, Harada started coaching career at V-Varen Nagasaki in 2012. In 2017, he moved to newly was relegated to J3 League club, Giravanz Kitakyushu and became a manager. Although Giravanz aimed to return to J2 League, the club finished at the 9th place of 17 clubs and he resigned end of 2017 season.

== Club statistics ==
Club performance			League		Cup		League Cup		Total	
Season	Club	League	Apps	Goals	Apps	Goals	Apps	Goals	Apps	Goals
Japan			League		Emperor's Cup		J.League Cup		Total	
1994	Yokohama Flügels	J1 League	31	1	2	0	2	0	35	1
1995	Yokohama Flügels	J1 League	25	4	2	0	-		27	4
1996	Yokohama Flügels	J1 League	9	1	1	0	3	0	13	1
1997	Yokohama Flügels	J1 League	20	2	4	0	9	0	33	2
1998	Yokohama Flügels	J1 League	22	0	4	0	3	0	29	0
1999	Cerezo Osaka	J1 League	30	0	2	0	4	0	36	0
2000	Cerezo Osaka	J1 League	11	0	0	0	2	0	13	0
2000	Kawasaki Frontale	J1 League	15	1	1	0	7	0	23	1
2001	Oita Trinita	J2 League	40	0	3	0	2	0	45	0
2002	Avispa Fukuoka	J2 League	22	0	4	0	-		26	0
2003	Avispa Fukuoka	J2 League	27	1	3	0	-		30	1
2005	V-Varen Nagasaki	Regional Leagues	18	5	-		-		18	5
2006	V-Varen Nagasaki	Regional Leagues	13	2	1	0	-		14	2
2007	V-Varen Nagasaki	Regional Leagues	16	1	3	0	-		19	1
2008	V-Varen Nagasaki	Regional Leagues	17	2	-		-		17	2
2009	V-Varen Nagasaki	Football League	21	0	0	0	-		21	0
2010	V-Varen Nagasaki	Football League	9	0	1	0	-		10	0
Total			346	20	31	0	30	0	407	20

== Managerial statistics ==
Team	From	To	Record				
Team	From	To	G	W	D	L	Win %
Giravanz Kitakyushu	2017	2017	32	13	7	12	40.63
V-Varen Nagasaki (Caretaker)	2022	2022	2	1	1	0	50.00
Total			34	14	8	12	41.18
