= Jin Sato (footballer) =

Japanese footballer

Jin Sato 佐藤 尽
Personal information
- Full name: Jin Sato
- Date of birth: September 27, 1974 (age 52)
- Place of birth: Muroran, Japan
- Height: 1.81 m (5 ft 11 1/2 in)
- Position: Defender

Youth career
- 1990–1992: Muroran Otani High School
- 1993–1996: Kokushikan University

Senior career*
Years	Team	Apps	(Gls)
1997–1998	Yokohama Flügels	17	(1)
1999–2002	Kyoto Purple Sanga	65	(4)
2002–2004	Consadole Sapporo	61	(5)
Total		143	(10)

Managerial career
- 2021: Montedio Yamagata
- 2025 -: Montedio Yamagata
Medal record
Yokohama Flügels
Winner	Emperor's Cup	1998
Runner-up	Emperor's Cup	1997
Kyoto Purple Sanga
Winner	Emperor's Cup	2002
- * Club domestic league appearances and goals

Jin Sato (佐藤 尽, Satō Jin; born September 27, 1974) is a Japanese football manager and former player. He is the currently the manager for J2 League club Montedio Yamagata.

== Playing career ==
Sato was born in Muroran on September 27, 1974. After graduating from Kokushikan University, he joined J1 League club Yokohama Flügels in 1997. He played many matches as center back and the club won the champions 1998 Emperor's Cup. However the club was disbanded end of 1998 season due to financial strain, he moved to Kyoto Purple Sanga in 1999. Although he played many matches, the club was relegated to J2 League from 2001. In 2001, the club won the champions and was returned to J1 in a year. However his opportunity to play decreased in 2002 and he moved to Consadole Sapporo in July. Although he played as starting member in all matches in 2002 season, the club was relegated to J2 from 2003. From 2004, he played many matches and retired at the end of the 2005 season.

== Career statistics ==
Appearances and goals by club, season and competition
Club	Season	League			Emperor's Cup		J.League Cup		Total	
Club	Season	Division	Apps	Goals	Apps	Goals	Apps	Goals	Apps	Goals
Yokohama Flügels	1997	J1 League	3	0	1	0	0	0	4	0
Yokohama Flügels	1998	J1 League	14	1	5	1	0	0	19	2
Kyoto Purple Sanga	1999	J1 League	20	1	0	0	4	0	24	1
Kyoto Purple Sanga	2000	J1 League	17	2	0	0	6	0	23	2
Kyoto Purple Sanga	2001	J2 League	24	1	2	1	2	0	28	2
Kyoto Purple Sanga	2002	J1 League	4	0	0	0	5	0	9	0
Consadole Sapporo	2002	J1 League	19	1	1	0	0	0	20	1
Consadole Sapporo	2003	J2 League	28	4	2	0	—		30	4
Consadole Sapporo	2004	J2 League	14	0	0	0	—		13	0
Career total			143	10	11	2	17	0	171	12
