= 1996 Yokohama Flügels season =

Yokohama Flügels
1996 season
- Manager: Otacílio
- Stadium: Yokohama Mitsuzawa Football Stadium
- J.League: 3rd
- Emperor's Cup: 4th Round
- J.League Cup: GL-B 3rd
- Top goalscorer: Evair (20)
- Highest home attendance: 14,692 (vs Urawa Red Diamonds, 27 April 1996); 45,159 (vs Kashima Antlers, 18 May 1996, Tokyo National Stadium)
- Lowest home attendance: 5,321 (vs Avispa Fukuoka, 30 October 1996)
- Average home league attendance: 13,877
Home colours	Away colours

1996 Yokohama Flügels season

== Review and events ==
=== League results summary ===
Overall								Home						Away					
Pld	W	D	L	GF	GA	GD	Pts	W	D	L	GF	GA	GD	W	D	L	GF	GA	GD
30	21	0	9	58	44	+14	63	11	0	4	28	19	+9	10	0	5	30	25	+5

Source: J.LEAGUE OFFICIAL GUIDE 1997. ISBN 4-09-102329-0.

=== League results by round ===
Round	1	2	3	4	5	6	7	8	9	10	11	12	13	14	15	16	17	18	19	20	21	22	23	24	25	26	27	28	29	30
Ground	A	A	H	A	H	A	H	A	H	H	A	A	H	A	H	H	A	H	A	H	H	A	H	A	H	A	H	A	H	A
Result	W	W	W	W	W	W	W	W	L	L	W	W	W	L	W	L	L	W	L	W	W	L	W	W	W	W	W	W	L	L
Position	4	5	5	2	1	1	1	1	1	3	1	1	1	1	1	1	6	4	5	5	5	6	6	4	3	3	2	2	2	3

Source: J.LEAGUE OFFICIAL GUIDE 1997. ISBN 4-09-102329-0.
A = Away; H = Home; W = Win; D = Draw; L = Loss

== Competitions ==
Competitions	Position
J.League	3rd / 16 clubs
Emperor's Cup	4th round
J.League Cup	GL-B 3rd / 8 clubs

== Domestic results ==
=== J.League ===
16 March 1996 1	Cerezo Osaka	0–2	Yokohama Flügels	Osaka Nagai No.2 Stadium
15:03 JST (UTC+09)		J. League	Evair 44'; Moriyama 73'	Attendance: 8,087; Referee: Yoshitsugu Katayama; Assistant referees: Kazuya Yanagisawa, Satoru Kawano; Fourth official: Tsuyoshi Miyake

20 March 1996 2	Gamba Osaka	0–1	Yokohama Flügels	Expo '70 Commemorative Stadium
15:00 JST (UTC+09)		J. League	Hattori 12'	Attendance: 9,739; Referee: Hideo Kikuchi; Assistant referees: Kazuhisa Osada, Takashi Aoki; Fourth official: Tsuyoshi Miyake

23 March 1996 3	Yokohama Flügels	1–0 (V-goal) (a.e.t.)	Shimizu S-Pulse	Yokohama Mitsuzawa Football Stadium
15:03 JST (UTC+09)	Miura 100'	J. League		Attendance: 10,296; Referee: Hiroyuki Umemoto; Assistant referees: Noboru Ishiyama, Kōji Minami; Fourth official: Michio Nakahara

30 March 1996 4	Sanfrecce Hiroshima	0–1 (V-goal) (a.e.t.)	Yokohama Flügels	Hiroshima Big Arch
15:04 JST (UTC+09)		J. League	Sampaio 103'	Attendance: 7,105; Referee: Tatsumi Ōno; Assistant referees: Yoshikazu Hiroshima, Kō Ōishi; Fourth official: Mamoru Ueda

3 April 1996 5	Yokohama Flügels	3–0	Kyoto Purple Sanga	Yokohama Mitsuzawa Football Stadium
19:03 JST (UTC+09)	Zinho 48'; Evair 71'; Harada 89'	J. League		Attendance: 6,162; Referee: Yoshitsugu Katayama; Assistant referees: Kenichi Koshiyama, Takuji Fukazawa; Fourth official: Jōji Kashihara

6 April 1996 6	Bellmare Hiratsuka	0–4	Yokohama Flügels	Hiratsuka Stadium
15:04 JST (UTC+09)		J. League	Evair 6', 79'; 25' (o.g.); Maezono 62'	Attendance: 8,855; Referee: Archundia; Assistant referees: Noboru Ishiyama, Susumu Takeda; Fourth official: Takatoshi Itō

13 April 1996 7	Yokohama Flügels	2–1	Kashiwa Reysol	Kagoshima Kamoike Stadium
13:03 JST (UTC+09)	Evair 18'; Sampaio 74'	J. League	Sawada 57'	Attendance: 8,083; Referee: Shinichirō Obata; Assistant referees: Tōru Yamashiro, Masatoshi Shibata; Fourth official: Shōji Hamada

17 April 1996 8	Avispa Fukuoka	3–4	Yokohama Flügels	Hakatanomori Football Stadium
19:00 JST (UTC+09)	Maradona 4'; Nagai 16'; Ueno 47'	J. League	Evair 21', 83'; Miura 67'; Hattori 89'	Attendance: 10,551; Referee: Tōru Kamikawa; Assistant referees: Hiroyuki Izumi, Takashi Aoki; Fourth official: Daikichi Kanada

20 April 1996 9	Yokohama Flügels	1–2 (V-goal) (a.e.t.)	Yokohama Marinos	Yokohama Mitsuzawa Football Stadium
15:00 JST (UTC+09)	Zinho 76'	J. League	Ihara 55'; Noda 100'	Attendance: 13,670; Referee: Yasuhiro Matsuzaki; Assistant referees: Toshiyuki Mayuzumi, Takuji Fukazawa; Fourth official: Michio Nakahara

27 April 1996 10	Yokohama Flügels	1–4	Urawa Red Diamonds	Yokohama Mitsuzawa Football Stadium
19:33 JST (UTC+09)	Yamaguchi 74'	J. League	Hirose 7'; Boli 24'; Iwase 57'; Okano 77'	Attendance: 14,692; Referee: Archundia; Assistant referees: Akihisa Makino, Keiji Kamiara; Fourth official: Takao Oura

1 May 1996 11	Júbilo Iwata	2–3	Yokohama Flügels	Júbilo Iwata Stadium
19:00 JST (UTC+09)	Schillaci 14'; Vanenburg 32'	J. League	Satsukawa 29'; Hattori 66'; Maezono 75'	Attendance: 14,231; Referee: Fumikazu Shioyazono; Assistant referees: Kazuhisa Osada, Hitoshi Nakagomi; Fourth official: Toshiaki Futamata

4 May 1996 12	Nagoya Grampus Eight	2–3	Yokohama Flügels	Gifu Nagaragawa Stadium
15:03 JST (UTC+09)	Moriyama 77'; Iijima 89'	J. League	Maezono 37', 55'; Zinho 80'	Attendance: 23,861; Referee: Naotsugu Fuse; Assistant referees: Yasushi Tsuchimoto, Takao Onshi; Fourth official: Katsuyasu Masui

11 May 1996 13	Yokohama Flügels	4–3 (V-goal) (a.e.t.)	Verdy Kawasaki	Yokohama Mitsuzawa Football Stadium
15:02 JST (UTC+09)	Zinho 3'; Evair 23', 76'; Yamaguchi 101'	J. League	Donizete 10', 77'; Hashiratani 74'	Attendance: 14,329; Referee: Masayoshi Okada; Assistant referees: Tetsuya Hamana, Yoshikazu Hiroshima; Fourth official: Jōji Kashihara

15 May 1996 14	JEF United Ichihara	4–2	Yokohama Flügels	Ichihara Stadium
19:03 JST (UTC+09)	Maslovar 6'; Hašek 13', 32'; Sandro 81'	J. League	Evair 16'; Maezono 33'	Attendance: 10,042; Referee: Tōru Kamikawa; Assistant referees: Hiroshi Fukuda, Hisaharu Kitamura; Fourth official: Eiji Kawai

18 May 1996 15	Yokohama Flügels	1–1 (V-goal) (a.e.t.) (6–5 p)	Kashima Antlers	Tokyo National Stadium
19:04 JST (UTC+09)	Zinho 74'	J. League	Mazinho 53'	Attendance: 45,159; Referee: Zoran Petrović; Assistant referees: Naoyuki Mori, Susumu Takeda; Fourth official: Masatoshi Ueda
	Penalties
	(penalty scored) Zinho; (penalty scored) Maezono; (penalty scored) Yamaguchi; (penalty scored) Miura; (penalty scored) Harada; (penalty scored) Hattori		(penalty scored) Leonardo; (penalty scored) Jorginho; (penalty scored) Honda; (penalty scored) Kurosaki; (penalty scored) Mazinho; (penalty missed) Sōma

28 August 1996 16	Yokohama Flügels	1–2	Nagoya Grampus Eight	Tokyo National Stadium
19:05 JST (UTC+09)	Sampaio 89'	J. League	Asano 24'; Durix 89'	Attendance: 30,128; Referee: Zoran Petrović; Assistant referees: Yū Nakamura, Akihisa Makino; Fourth official: Keizō Yamazaki

31 August 1996 17	Verdy Kawasaki	3–2	Yokohama Flügels	Sapporo Atsubetsu Stadium
15:04 JST (UTC+09)	Magrão 76'; Gen 88'; Kitazawa 89'	J. League	Evair 16'; Sampaio 66'	Attendance: 14,280; Referee: Lim Kee Chong; Assistant referees: Noboru Ishiyama, Mitsuru Satō; Fourth official: Eiji Kaneda

7 September 1996 18	Yokohama Flügels	2–0	JEF United Ichihara	Yokohama Mitsuzawa Football Stadium
18:34 JST (UTC+09)	Yamaguchi 27'; Yoshida 61'	J. League		Attendance: 11,103; Referee: Yasuhiro Matsuzaki; Assistant referees: Kimio Izaki, Susumu Takeda; Fourth official: Michio Nakahara

14 September 1996 19	Kashima Antlers	2–1	Yokohama Flügels	Kashima Soccer Stadium
16:04 JST (UTC+09)	Yanagisawa 33'; Hasegawa 77'	J. League	Maezono 52'	Attendance: 15,435; Referee: Tōru Kamikawa; Assistant referees: Masahiro Katagiri, Akihisa Makino; Fourth official: Masakatsu Isozaki

21 September 1996 20	Yokohama Flügels	2–1	Cerezo Osaka	Toyama Stadium
16:04 JST (UTC+09)	Evair 28'; Yamaguchi 84'	J. League	Narcizio 44'	Attendance: 10,644; Referee: Lim Kee Chong; Assistant referees: Tetsu Karakida, Kōji Taniuchi; Fourth official: Kinji Sakō

28 September 1996 21	Yokohama Flügels	3–2 (V-goal) (a.e.t.)	Gamba Osaka	Yokohama Mitsuzawa Football Stadium
18:33 JST (UTC+09)	Hattori 21'; Evair 42' 102'	J. League	Mladenović 48'; Shimada 67'	Attendance: 7,035; Referee: Leslie Mottram; Assistant referees: Kazuaki Hamaguchi, Toshimitsu Yoshida; Fourth official: Kenji Ōgiya

2 October 1996 22	Shimizu S-Pulse	4–2	Yokohama Flügels	Tokyo National Stadium
19:00 JST (UTC+09)	Hasegawa 8'; Sawanobori 59'; Oliva 61', 86'	J. League	Yamaguchi 42', 87'	Attendance: 16,788; Referee: Tetsuya Hamana; Assistant referees: Takashi Kunori, Satoru Ishizawa; Fourth official: Hide Lii

5 October 1996 23	Yokohama Flügels	2–0	Sanfrecce Hiroshima	Yokohama Mitsuzawa Football Stadium
18:33 JST (UTC+09)	Evair 16', 39'	J. League		Attendance: 7,111; Referee: Naotsugu Fuse; Assistant referees: Mitsuru Satō, Keiji Kamiara; Fourth official: Masaki Yoshihara

16 October 1996 24	Kyoto Purple Sanga	0–1	Yokohama Flügels	Kyoto Nishikyogoku Stadium
19:02 JST (UTC+09)		J. League	Yamaguchi 75'	Attendance: 8,227; Referee: Yasuhiro Hemmi; Assistant referees: Naoyuki Mori, Sōichirō Kaneko; Fourth official: Morihisa Yamaguchi

19 October 1996 25	Yokohama Flügels	1–0	Bellmare Hiratsuka	Yokohama Mitsuzawa Football Stadium
15:01 JST (UTC+09)	Yamaguchi 25'	J. League		Attendance: 10,348; Referee: Kiyoshi Ōta; Assistant referees: Naoki Esumi, Masaaki Shimomura; Fourth official: Hiroshi Yamaguchi

26 October 1996 26	Kashiwa Reysol	1–2	Yokohama Flügels	Hitachi Kashiwa Soccer Stadium
15:00 JST (UTC+09)	52' (o.g.)	J. League	Miura 21'; Evair 61'	Attendance: 13,181; Referee: Zoran Petrović; Assistant referees: Hiroshi Fukuda, Keiji Kamiara; Fourth official: Tatsuya Sakata

30 October 1996 27	Yokohama Flügels	3–1	Avispa Fukuoka	Yokohama Mitsuzawa Football Stadium
19:03 JST (UTC+09)	Evair 5', 67', 75'	J. League	Báez 33'	Attendance: 5,321; Referee: Leslie Mottram; Assistant referees: Toshiyuki Mayuzumi, Kenichi Koshiyama; Fourth official: Tasuku Onodera

2 November 1996 28	Yokohama Marinos	1–2	Yokohama Flügels	Yokohama Mitsuzawa Football Stadium
15:04 JST (UTC+09)	Bisconti 56'	J. League	Maezono 40'; Sampaio 89'	Attendance: 12,016; Referee: Kenji Tanaka; Assistant referees: Morihisa Yamaguchi, Takao Onshi; Fourth official: Susumu Miyaho

6 November 1996 29	Yokohama Flügels	1–2	Júbilo Iwata	Yokohama Mitsuzawa Football Stadium
19:04 JST (UTC+09)	Maezono 47'	J. League	Dunga 63'; Hattori 89'	Attendance: 14,070; Referee: Zoran Petrović; Assistant referees: Noboru Ishiyama, Toshimitsu Yoshida; Fourth official: Tadashi Fujiwara

9 November 1996 30	Urawa Red Diamonds	3–0	Yokohama Flügels	Urawa Komaba Stadium
14:33 JST (UTC+09)	Bein 24'; Okano 33'; Takita 79' (pen.)	J. League		Attendance: 19,357; Referee: Leslie Mottram; Assistant referees: Yoshikazu Hiroshima, Keiji Kamiara; Fourth official: Izumi Okada

=== Emperor's Cup ===
1st Round	bye

2nd Round	bye

17 November 1996 3rd Round	Yokohama Flügels	4–0	Nippon Denso	Yokohama Mitsuzawa Football Stadium
: JST (UTC+09)	? ?' ? ?' ? ?' ? ?'

23 December 1996 4th Round	Yokohama Flügels	0–1	Kyoto Purple Sanga	Ehime Matsuyama Athletic Stadium
: JST (UTC+09)			? ?'

=== J.League Cup ===
1 June 1996 GL-B-1-1	Nagoya Grampus Eight	1–1	Yokohama Flügels	Nagoya Mizuho Athletics Stadium
16:04 JST (UTC+09)	Hirano 50'	J. League	Zinho 16'	Attendance: 21,713; Referee: Archundia; Assistant referees: Noboru Ishiyama, Masahiro Katagiri; Fourth official: Yukio Fujita

5 June 1996 GL-B-1-2	Yokohama Flügels	1–1 (2–2 agg.)	Nagoya Grampus Eight	Yokohama Mitsuzawa Football Stadium
19:00 JST (UTC+09)	Zinho 19'	J. League	Moriyama 83'	Attendance: 8,065; Referee: Yoshimi Ogawa; Assistant referees: Takashi Kunori, Hisaharu Kitamura; Fourth official: Katsunori Moriya

8 June 1996 GL-B-2-1	Yokohama Flügels	0–1	Shimizu S-Pulse	Yokohama Mitsuzawa Football Stadium
18:33 JST (UTC+09)		J. League	Nagai 58'	Attendance: 10,839; Referee: Tatsumi Ōno; Assistant referees: Takayoshi Kashino, Kō Ōishi; Fourth official: Mitsune Yamaguchi

12 June 1996 GL-B-2-2	Shimizu S-Pulse	3–3 (4–3 agg.)	Yokohama Flügels	Nihondaira Sports Stadium
19:00 JST (UTC+09)	Sawanobori 11'; Hasegawa 60'; Nagai 81'	J. League	Maezono 24', 69'; Satsukawa 64'	Attendance: 14,949; Referee: Zoran Petrović; Assistant referees: Kōji Taniuchi, Naoyuki Mori; Fourth official: Masakazu Hōjō

15 June 1996 GL-B-3-1	Yokohama Flügels	5–1	Verdy Kawasaki	Kagoshima Kamoike Stadium
18:34 JST (UTC+09)	Yamaguchi 16'; Maezono 32', 48'; Zinho 64'; Sampaio 89'	J. League	Caíco 79'	Attendance: 11,820; Referee: Archundia; Assistant referees: Tōru Yamashiro, Satoru Kawano; Fourth official: Shōji Hamada

19 June 1996 GL-B-3-2	Verdy Kawasaki	3–1 (4–6 agg.)	Yokohama Flügels	Kawasaki Todoroki Stadium
19:00 JST (UTC+09)	Caíco 56'; Kitazawa 59'; Kurihara 87'	J. League	Zinho 44'	Attendance: 11,431; Referee: Hiroyuki Umemoto; Assistant referees: Akihisa Makino, Hitoshi Nakagomi; Fourth official: Haruo Imai

22 June 1996 GL-B-4-1	Avispa Fukuoka	1–1	Yokohama Flügels	Nagasaki Stadium
18:31 JST (UTC+09)	Ishimaru 5'	J. League	Y. Moriyama 46'	Attendance: 10,085; Referee: Shinichirō Obata; Assistant referees: Kōji Minami, Masaaki Shimomura; Fourth official: Naohito Ogawa

26 June 1996 GL-B-4-2	Yokohama Flügels	4–1 (5–2 agg.)	Avispa Fukuoka	Yokohama Mitsuzawa Football Stadium
19:00 JST (UTC+09)	Yamaguchi 14'; Maezono 35'; Zinho 69'; Sampaio 89'	J. League	Maradona 57'	Attendance: 4,503; Referee: Yoshimi Ogawa; Assistant referees: Yū Nakamura, Satoru Ishizawa; Fourth official: Jōji Kashihara

29 June 1996 GL-B-5-1	Yokohama Flügels	2–3	JEF United Ichihara	Yokohama Mitsuzawa Football Stadium
18:33 JST (UTC+09)	Hattori 20'; Yamaguchi 21'	J. League	Hašek 17', 40'; Sandro 79'	Attendance: 8,787; Referee: Zoran Petrović; Assistant referees: Kazuaki Hamaguchi, Takao Onshi; Fourth official: Michio Nakahara

3 July 1996 GL-B-5-2	JEF United Ichihara	1–5 (4–7 agg.)	Yokohama Flügels	Ichihara Stadium
19:00 JST (UTC+09)	Hašek 83'	J. League	Yamaguchi 4', 49'; Denilson 58'; Zinho 75', 84'	Attendance: 6,169; Referee: Archundia; Assistant referees: Toshimitsu Yoshida, Kō Ōishi; Fourth official: Kōji Sugikawa

10 August 1996 GL-B-6-1	Yokohama Flügels	1–1	Cerezo Osaka	Kagoshima Kamoike Stadium
18:32 JST (UTC+09)	Maezono 44'	J. League	Morishima 37'	Attendance: 6,055; Referee: Yasuhiro Hemmi; Assistant referees: Satoru Kawano, Hiroyuki Izumi; Fourth official: Masayuki Kanda

14 August 1996 GL-B-6-2	Cerezo Osaka	1–1 (2–2 agg.)	Yokohama Flügels	Osaka Nagai Stadium
19:03 JST (UTC+09)	Tsukamoto 64'	J. League	Maezono 15'	Attendance: 23,052; Referee: Yasuhiro Matsuzaki; Assistant referees: Hiroshi Fukuda, Tamotsu Ōnishi; Fourth official: 田付 秀次

17 August 1996 GL-B-7-1	Kashima Antlers	1–1	Yokohama Flügels	Kashima Soccer Stadium
18:01 JST (UTC+09)	Jorginho 88'	J. League	Satsukawa 44'	Attendance: 15,736; Referee: Naotsugu Fuse; Assistant referees: Tetsu Karakida, Kō Ōishi; Fourth official: Toshio Itō

21 August 1996 GL-B-7-2	Yokohama Flügels	1–1 (2–2 agg.)	Kashima Antlers	Yokohama Mitsuzawa Football Stadium
19:03 JST (UTC+09)	Hattori 5'	J. League	Oniki 60'	Attendance: 11,186; Referee: Kazuo Kakihana; Assistant referees: Kenichi Koshiyama, Takashi Aoki; Fourth official: Michio Nakahara

== Player statistics ==
Pos.	Nat.	Player	D.o.B. (Age)	Height / Weight	J.League		Emperor's Cup		J.League Cup		Total	
Pos.	Nat.	Player	D.o.B. (Age)	Height / Weight	Apps	Goals	Apps	Goals	Apps	Goals	Apps	Goals
FW	(Brazil)	Evair	February 21, 1965 (aged 31)	183 cm / 80 kg	23	20	1	0	0	0	24	20
FW	(Japan)	Osamu Maeda	September 5, 1965 (aged 30)	176 cm / 74 kg	3	0	0	0	4	0	7	0
MF	(Brazil)	Zinho	June 17, 1967 (aged 28)	172 cm / 71 kg	27	5	2	1	14	7	43	13
DF	(Japan)	Yoshirō Moriyama	November 9, 1967 (aged 28)	176 cm / 72 kg	26	1	1	0	10	1	37	2
DF	(Japan)	Junji Koizumi	January 11, 1968 (aged 28)	183 cm / 73 kg	16	0	0	0	5	0	21	0
MF	(Brazil)	César Sampaio	March 31, 1968 (aged 27)	177 cm / 74 kg	27	5	2	0	14	2	43	7
DF	(Japan)	Naoto Ōtake	October 18, 1968 (aged 27)	178 cm / 72 kg	30	0	2	0	14	0	46	0
DF	(Japan)	Kōji Maeda	February 3, 1969 (aged 27)	178 cm / 76 kg	20	0	0	0	8	0	28	0
MF	(Japan)	Motohiro Yamaguchi	January 29, 1969 (aged 27)	177 cm / 72 kg	28	8	1	0	14	5	43	13
MF	(Japan)	Hideki Katsura	March 6, 1970 (aged 26)	160 cm / 58 kg	1	0	0	0	0	0	1	0
DF	(Japan)	Shōji Nonoshita	May 24, 1970 (aged 25)	182 cm / 76 kg	2	0	2	0	0	0	4	0
FW	(Japan)	Hiroki Hattori	August 30, 1971 (aged 24)	180 cm / 76 kg	22	4	1	0	13	2	36	6
MF	(Japan)	Takeo Harada	October 2, 1971 (aged 24)	173 cm / 72 kg	9	1	1	0	3	0	13	1
GK	(Japan)	Hiroshi Satō	March 7, 1972 (aged 24)	181 cm / 74 kg	0	0		0	0	0		
DF	(Japan)	Norihiro Satsukawa	April 18, 1972 (aged 23)	175 cm / 75 kg	22	1	2	0	14	2	38	3
FW	(Japan)	Yoshiyuki Sakamoto	May 30, 1972 (aged 23)	170 cm / 65 kg	0	0		0	0	0		
GK	(Japan)	Atsuhiko Mori	May 31, 1972 (aged 23)	179 cm / 73 kg	7	0	0	0	0	0	7	0
GK	(Japan)	Ryōma Sugihara	November 14, 1972 (aged 23)	183 cm / 80 kg	0	0		0	0	0		
MF	(Japan)	Masaaki Takada	July 26, 1973 (aged 22)	182 cm / 76 kg	1	0	0	0	0	0	1	0
MF	(Japan)	Masakiyo Maezono	October 29, 1973 (aged 22)	170 cm / 63 kg	26	8	2	0	11	7	39	15
GK	(Japan)	Hiroyuki Nitao	November 27, 1973 (aged 22)	181 cm / 76 kg	0	0		0	0	0		
DF	(Japan)	Nobuyuki Ōishi	May 23, 1974 (aged 21)	180 cm / 72 kg	0	0		0	0	0		
MF	(Japan)	Satoshi Yoneyama	June 27, 1974 (aged 21)	171 cm / 65 kg	0	0		0	0	0		
DF	(Japan)	Atsuhiro Miura	July 24, 1974 (aged 21)	174 cm / 68 kg	30	3	2	0	14	0	46	3
DF	(Japan)	Seiichirō Okuno	July 26, 1974 (aged 21)	180 cm / 68 kg	0	0		0	0	0		
FW	(Japan)	Hideaki Kaetsu	October 8, 1974 (aged 21)	177 cm / 62 kg	0	0		0	0	0		
GK	(Japan)	Seigō Narazaki	April 15, 1976 (aged 19)	185 cm / 76 kg	23	0	2	0	14	0	39	0
MF	(Japan)	Shinya Mitsuoka	April 22, 1976 (aged 19)	176 cm / 67 kg	1	0	1	3	2	0	4	3
MF	(Japan)	Yasuhiro Hato	May 4, 1976 (aged 19)	177 cm / 70 kg	0	0		0	0	0		
MF	(Japan)	Yoshikiyo Kuboyama	July 21, 1976 (aged 19)	171 cm / 60 kg	1	0	0	0	0	0	1	0
FW	(Japan)	Takayuki Yoshida	March 14, 1977 (aged 19)	172 cm / 62 kg	2	1	1	0	2	0	5	1
MF	(Japan)	Atsushi Moriyama	April 13, 1977 (aged 18)	175 cm / 63 kg	0	0		0	0	0		
FW	(Japan)	Shinya Tanimoto	April 26, 1977 (aged 18)	173 cm / 67 kg	0	0		0	0	0		
FW	(Japan)	Takashi Sakurai	May 4, 1977 (aged 18)	180 cm / 74 kg	0	0		0	0	0		
MF	(Japan)	Yūki Inoue	October 31, 1977 (aged 18)	173 cm / 62 kg	0	0		0	0	0		
FW	(Japan)	Haruki Seto	March 14, 1978 (aged 18)	180 cm / 70 kg	0	0		0	0	0		
MF	(Brazil)	Denilson †	October 8, 1972 (aged 23)	173 cm / 74 kg	3	0	1	0	8	1	12	1

- † player(s) joined the team after the opening of this season.

== Transfers ==
In:

No.	Pos.	Nation	Player
—	GK	JPN	Hiroyuki Nitao (from Fukuoka University)
—	DF	JPN	Yoshirō Moriyama (from Sanfrecce Hiroshima)
—	DF	JPN	Kōji Maeda (from Fukuoka Blux)
—	DF	JPN	Shōji Nonoshita (from Gamba Osaka)
—	MF	JPN	Atsushi Moriyama (from Shizuoka Gakuen Senior High School)
—	MF	JPN	Yūki Inoue (from Yokohama Flügels youth)
—	FW	JPN	Shinya Tanimoto (from Miyazaki Kogyo High School)
—	FW	JPN	Takashi Sakurai (from Shizuoka Gakuen Senior High School)
—	FW	JPN	Haruki Seto (from Mizuhashi High School)

Out:

No.	Pos.	Nation	Player
—	DF	JPN	Hiroshi Hirakawa (to Toshiba)
—	DF	JPN	Hiroki Azuma (to Vissel Kobe)
—	DF	JPN	Atsuhiro Iwai (to Avispa Fukuoka)
—	DF	JPN	Ippei Watanabe (to Júbilo Iwata)
—	DF	JPN	Kōichi Togashi (to Toshiba)
—	MF	JPN	Hideki Yoshioka (to Gamba Osaka)
—	MF	JPN	Ichizo Nakata (to Avispa Fukuoka)
—	MF	BRA	Rodrigo (to Paraná Clube)
—	MF	JPN	山竹 操

== Transfers during the season ==
=== In ===
- (Brazil) Denilson Antonio Paludo (on June)

=== Out ===
- (Japan) Takashi Sakurai (loan to Gimnasia on August)

== Awards ==
- J.League Best XI: (Japan) Seigō Narazaki, (Japan) Motohiro Yamaguchi, (Japan) Masakiyo Maezono

== Other pages ==
- (in Japanese) J. League official site
- (in Japanese) Yokohama F. Marinos official web site
