= Koji Maeda =

Japanese footballer and manager

Koji Maeda 前田 浩二
Personal information
- Full name: Koji Maeda
- Date of birth: 3 February 1969 (age 57)
- Place of birth: Kagoshima, Japan
- Height: 1.78 m (5 ft 10 in)
- Position: Defender

Youth career
- 1984–1986: Kagoshima Jitsugyo High School
- 1987–1990: National Institute of Fitness and Sports in Kanoya

Senior career*
Years	Team	Apps	(Gls)
1991–1992	Gamba Osaka	0	(0)
1993–1994	PJM Futures	42	(6)
1995	Fukuoka Blux	8	(0)
1996–1998	Yokohama Flügels	65	(1)
1999	Júbilo Iwata	15	(1)
2000	FC Tokyo	0	(0)
2000–2001	Avispa Fukuoka	42	(3)
2002	Vissel Kobe	3	(0)
2002	Sagan Tosu	16	(0)
2003–2004	Volca Kagoshima		
Total		191	(11)

Managerial career
- 2003–2004: Volca Kagoshima
- 2012: Avispa Fukuoka
- 2013: Gainare Tottori
- 2014: INAC Kobe Leonessa
- 2023: Shanghai Shenhua (assistant)
- 2024: Qingdao West Coast (assistant)
- 2024: Kunming City
- 2025: Guangxi Pingguo
Medal record
Yokohama Flügels
Winner	Emperor's Cup	1998
Runner-up	Emperor's Cup	1997
Júbilo Iwata
Winner	J1 League	1999
- * Club domestic league appearances and goals

Koji Maeda (前田 浩二, Maeda Koji; born 3 February 1969) is a former Japanese football player and manager.

== Playing career ==
Maeda was born in Kagoshima Prefecture on 3 February 1969. He played as center back at many clubs. After graduating from National Institute of Fitness and Sports in Kanoya, he joined Matsushita Electric (later Gamba Osaka) in 1991. However he could not play at all in the match. In 1993, he moved to Japan Football League (JFL) club PJM Futures (later Sagan Tosu). He played many matches in 2 seasons. In 1995, he moved to JFL club Fukuoka Blux (later Avispa Fukuoka). Although the club won the champions and was promoted to J1 League, he could not play many matches. In 1996, he moved to Yokohama Flügels. He played as regular player in 3 seasons. The club won the 2nd place 1997 Emperor's Cup and the champions 1998 Emperor's Cup. However the club was disbanded end of 1998 season due to financial strain, he moved to Júbilo Iwata in 1999. The club won the champions 1999 J1 League and 1998–99 Asian Club Championship. In 2000, he moved to FC Tokyo. However he could not play at all in the match and he moved to Avispa Fukuoka in April 2000. Although he played as regular player in 2 seasons, the club was relegated to J2 League end of 2001 season. In 2002, he moved to Vissel Kobe. In August 2002, he moved to J2 club Sagan Tosu. In 2003, he moved to his local club Volca Kagoshima in Regional Leagues. He played as playing manager in 2 seasons and retired end of 2004 season.

== Coaching career ==
In 2003, when Maeda was player, he became a playing manager at his local club Volca Kagoshima in Regional Leagues. End of 2004 season, he retired from playing career and left the club. In 2005, he moved to Vissel Kobe and became a coach. In 2011, he returned to Volca Kagoshima and became a coach. In 2012, he moved to J2 League club Avispa Fukuoka and became a manager. However the club results were bad and he was sacked in October 2012. In 2013, he moved to J2 club Gainare Tottori. In August, manager Norio Omura was sacked and Maeda became new manager. Although he managed 14 matches, the club failed to win even one match. The club was relegated to J3 League and Maeda was sacked end of season. In 2014, he signed with L.League club INAC Kobe Leonessa. Although the club won the champions for 3 years in a row until 2013, the club results were bad in 2014 and he was sacked in October when the club was the 5th place.

== Club statistics ==
Club performance			League		Cup		League Cup		Total	
Season	Club	League	Apps	Goals	Apps	Goals	Apps	Goals	Apps	Goals
Japan			League		Emperor's Cup		J.League Cup		Total	
1990/91	Matsushita Electric	JSL Division 1	0	0	0	0	0	0	0	0
1991/92	Matsushita Electric	JSL Division 1	0	0			0	0	0	0
1992	Gamba Osaka	J1 League	-				0	0	0	0
1993	PJM Futures	Football League	17	2	0	0	-		17	2
1994	PJM Futures	Football League	25	4	1	0	-		26	4
1995	Fukuoka Blux	Football League	8	0	0	0	-		8	0
1996	Yokohama Flügels	J1 League	20	0	0	0	8	0	28	0
1997	Yokohama Flügels	J1 League	21	0	5	0	10	0	36	0
1998	Yokohama Flügels	J1 League	24	1	5	0	3	0	32	1
1999	Júbilo Iwata	J1 League	15	1	3	1	3	0	21	2
2000	FC Tokyo	J1 League	0	0	0	0	0	0	0	0
2000	Avispa Fukuoka	J1 League	21	2	2	0	2	0	25	2
2001	Avispa Fukuoka	J1 League	21	1	0	0	1	0	22	1
2002	Vissel Kobe	J1 League	3	0	0	0	6	0	9	0
2002	Sagan Tosu	J2 League	16	0	2	0	-		18	0
2003	Volca Kagoshima	Regional Leagues			1	0	-		1	0
2004	Volca Kagoshima	Regional Leagues			-		-			
Total			191	11	19	1	33	0	243	12

== Managerial statistics ==
Team	From	To	Record				
Team	From	To	G	W	D	L	Win %
Avispa Fukuoka	2012	2012	42	9	14	19	21.43
Gainare Tottori	2013	2013	14	0	5	9	0.00
Total			56	9	19	28	16.07
