= Atsuhiro Miura =

Japanese footballer

Atsuhiro Miura 三浦 淳寛
Personal information
- Full name: Atsuhiro Miura
- Date of birth: 24 July 1974 (age 52)
- Place of birth: Oita, Japan
- Height: 1.75 m (5 ft 9 in)
- Position: Midfielder

Youth career
- 1990–1992: Kunimi High School

College career
Years	Team	Apps	(Gls)
1993	Aoyama Gakuin University		

Senior career*
Years	Team	Apps	(Gls)
1994–1998	Yokohama Flügels	145	(22)
1999–2000	Yokohama F. Marinos	55	(7)
2001–2004	Tokyo Verdy	79	(10)
2005–2007	Vissel Kobe	76	(21)
2007–2010	Yokohama FC	72	(5)
Total		427	(65)

International career
2000	Japan Olympic (O.P.)	3	(0)
1999–2005	Japan	25	(1)

Managerial career
- 2020–2022: Vissel Kobe
Medal record
Men's football
Representing Japan
AFC Asian Cup
Winner	2000 Lebanon
Winner	2004 China
FIFA Confederations Cup
Runner-up	2001 Korea/Japan
- * Club domestic league appearances and goals

Atsuhiro Miura (三浦 淳寛, Miura Atsuhiro; born 24 July 1974) is a former Japanese football player. He played for Japan national team.

He is not related to fellow footballer Kazuyoshi Miura.

== Club career ==
Miura was born in Oita on 24 July 1974. After dropped out from Aoyama Gakuin University, he joined Yokohama Flügels in 1994. He became a regular player in 1995 and he mainly played as left midfielder. The club won the champions at 1994–95 Asian Cup Winners' Cup. In 1998, the club won Emperor's Cup. However the club was disbanded end of 1998 season due to financial strain, he moved to Yokohama F. Marinos. He moved to Tokyo Verdy in 2001. However his opportunity to play decreased behind Takahito Soma while Miura was away from the club for Japan national team. He moved to Vissel Kobe in 2005. Although he served as captain, his opportunity to play decreased in 2007. In August 2007, he moved to Yokohama FC was founded by Yokohama Flügels supporters. He retired end of 2010 season.

== National team career ==
On 6 June 1999, Miura debuted for Japan national team against Peru. He also played at 1999 Copa America. In September 2000, he was elected Japan for Japan U-23 national team as over age for 2000 Summer Olympics. In October, he played at 2000 Asian Cup and Japan won the champions. In 2001, he played at 2001 Confederations Cup and Japan won the 2nd place. In 2003, he was elected Japan for the first time in 2 years. Although he played as left side-back, there were few opportunity to play behind Alessandro Santos. He was also elected Japan for 2004 Asian Cup won the champions and 2005 Confederations Cup. However he did not play in the match at both competition. He played 25 games and scored 1 goal for Japan until 2005.

== Career statistics ==
Appearances and goals by club, season and competition
Club	Season	League			Emperor's Cup		J.League Cup		Total	
Club	Season	Division	Apps	Goals	Apps	Goals	Apps	Goals	Apps	Goals
Yokohama Flügels	1994	J1 League	0	0	0	0	0	0	0	0
Yokohama Flügels	1995	J1 League	51	6	2	1	—		53	7
Yokohama Flügels	1996	J1 League	30	3	2	0	14	0	46	3
Yokohama Flügels	1997	J1 League	32	3	5	2	10	1	47	6
Yokohama Flügels	1998	J1 League	32	10	5	0	3	2	40	12
Yokohama F. Marinos	1999	J1 League	29	2	3	0	6	0	38	2
Yokohama F. Marinos	2000	J1 League	26	5	1	0	3	0	30	5
Tokyo Verdy	2001	J1 League	22	3	0	0	2	0	24	3
Tokyo Verdy	2002	J1 League	8	1	0	0	0	0	8	1
Tokyo Verdy	2003	J1 League	26	2	3	0	4	1	33	3
Tokyo Verdy	2004	J1 League	23	4	1	0	0	0	24	4
Vissel Kobe	2005	J1 League	25	6	2	0	0	0	27	6
Vissel Kobe	2006	J2 League	46	15	0	0	—		46	15
Vissel Kobe	2007	J1 League	5	0	0	0	1	0	6	0
Yokohama FC	2007	J1 League	9	0	1	0	0	0	10	0
Yokohama FC	2008	J2 League	37	2	2	0	—		39	2
Yokohama FC	2009	J2 League	24	3	1	0	—		25	3
Yokohama FC	2010	J2 League	2	0	0	0	—		2	0
Career total			427	65	25	3	43	4	495	72

== National team statistics ==
Japan national team
Year	Apps	Goals
1999	5	1
2000	8	0
2001	3	0
2002	0	0
2003	1	0
2004	6	0
2005	2	0
Total	25	1

- 2000 Asian Cup (champions)
- 2001 Confederations Cup
- 2004 Asian Cup (champions)
- 2005 Confederations Cup

== Honors and awards ==
Yokohama Flugels

- Emperor's Cup: 1998
- Asian Cup Winner's Cup: 1995
- Asian Super Cup: 1995

Tokyo Verdy

- Emperor's Cup: 2004

Japan

- AFC Asian Cup: 2000, 2004
- FIFA Confederations Cup Runner-up: 2001
