= Kazuki Sato (footballer, born 1974) =

Japanese footballer

Kazuki Sato 佐藤 一樹
Personal information
- Full name: Kazuki Sato
- Date of birth: June 27, 1974 (age 52)
- Place of birth: Takasaki, Gunma, Japan
- Height: 1.70 m (5 ft 7 in)
- Position: Midfielder

Youth career
- 1990–1992: Maebashi Commercial High School
- 1993–1996: University of Tsukuba

Senior career*
Years	Team	Apps	(Gls)
1997–1998	Yokohama Flügels	22	(3)
1999	Yokohama F. Marinos	13	(3)
2000	Kyoto Purple Sanga	13	(0)
2001	Oita Trinita	16	(1)
2002–2003	Yokohama F. Marinos	8	(0)
2004	Sanfrecce Hiroshima	3	(0)
2005	Yokohama FC	26	(0)
Total		101	(7)
Medal record
Yokohama Flügels
Winner	Emperor's Cup	1998
Runner-up	Emperor's Cup	1997
Yokohama F. Marinos
Winner	J1 League	2003
Runner-up	J1 League	2002
- * Club domestic league appearances and goals

Kazuki Sato (佐藤 一樹, Satō Kazuki; born June 27, 1974) is a former Japanese football player and manager.

== Playing career ==
Sato was born in Takasaki on June 27, 1974. After graduating from University of Tsukuba, he joined J1 League club Yokohama Flügels in 1997. He played many matches as right side midfielder and right side back. The club won the 2nd place 1997 Emperor's Cup and the champions 1998 Emperor's Cup. However the club was disbanded end of 1998 season due to financial strain, he moved to Yokohama F. Marinos in 1999. In 2000, he moved to Kyoto Purple Sanga. However the club was relegated to J2 League end of 2000 season. In 2001, he moved to J2 club Oita Trinita. In 2002, he moved to Yokohama F. Marinos again. Although the club won the champions in 2003 J1 League, he could not play many matches in 2 seasons. In 2004, he moved to Sanfrecce Hiroshima. However he could hardly play in the match. In 2005, he moved to J2 club Yokohama FC was founded by Yokohama Flügels supporters. Although he played many matches, his opportunity to play decreased in late 2005 season and he retired end of 2005 season.

== Club statistics ==
Club performance			League		Cup		League Cup		Total	
Season	Club	League	Apps	Goals	Apps	Goals	Apps	Goals	Apps	Goals
Japan			League		Emperor's Cup		J.League Cup		Total	
1997	Yokohama Flügels	J1 League	3	0	4	1	0	0	7	1
1998	Yokohama Flügels	J1 League	19	3	0	0	4	0	23	3
1999	Yokohama F. Marinos	J1 League	13	3	1	0	2	0	16	3
2000	Kyoto Purple Sanga	J1 League	13	0	0	0	6	1	19	1
2001	Oita Trinita	J2 League	16	1	1	0	4	2	21	3
2002	Yokohama F. Marinos	J1 League	1	0	0	0	1	0	2	0
2003	Yokohama F. Marinos	J1 League	7	0	1	0	1	0	9	0
2004	Sanfrecce Hiroshima	J1 League	3	0	0	0	1	0	4	0
2005	Yokohama FC	J2 League	26	0	0	0	-		26	0
Career total			101	7	7	1	19	3	127	11
