= Zinho =

Brazilian football manager and former player

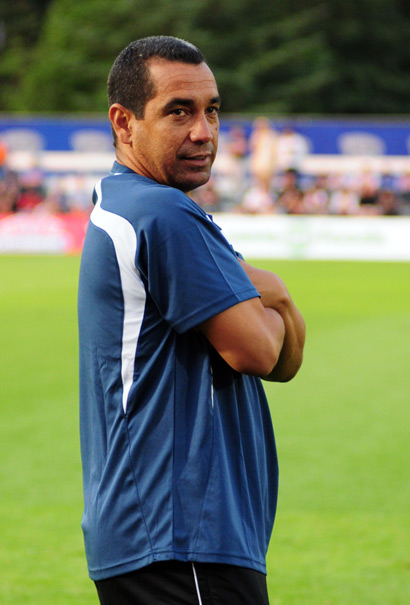

Personal information
- Full name: Crizam César de Oliveira Filho
- Date of birth: 17 June 1967 (age 59)
- Place of birth: Nova Iguaçu, Rio de Janeiro, Brazil
- Height: 1.70 m (5 ft 7 in)
- Positions: Left winger; attacking midfielder

Youth career
- 1978–1985: Flamengo

Senior career*
Years	Team	Apps	(Gls)
1986–1992	Flamengo	133	(13)
1992–1994	Palmeiras	44	(11)
1995–1997	Yokohama Flügels	83	(21)
1997–1999	Palmeiras	41	(4)
2000–2002	Grêmio	51	(10)
2002–2003	Palmeiras	16	(2)
2003	Cruzeiro	31	(3)
2004–2005	Flamengo	31	(3)
2005	Nova Iguaçu	0	(0)
2006–2007	Miami FC	49	(7)
Total		479	(74)

International career
1989–1998	Brazil	55	(7)

Managerial career
- 2006–2009: Miami FC
- 2011: Nova Iguaçu
- 2015–2016: Vasco da Gama (assistant)
Medal record
Men's Football
Representing Brazil
FIFA World Cup
Winner	1994
Copa América
Runner-up	1995 Uruguay
CONCACAF Gold Cup
Third place	1998 USA
- * Club domestic league appearances and goals

Crizam César de Oliveira Filho, better known as Zinho (Brazilian Portuguese: [ˈzĩɲu]; born 17 June 1967), is a Brazilian football pundit and former professional footballer who played as a midfielder. A left-footed playmaker, he was known for his ball control, passing ability and capacity to dictate the tempo of play. In addition, he is also one of a select number of players who have amassed over 1,050 career appearances (the first Brazilian to achieve the feat, since the time matches are recorded).

At club level, Zinho is best known for his spells with Flamengo and Palmeiras. He won the Campeonato Brasileiro Série A four times with Flamengo, Palmeiras and Cruzeiro, as well as the 1999 Copa Libertadores with Palmeiras. At international level, he was a regular member of the Brazil side that won the 1994 FIFA World Cup, starting all seven of the team's matches during the tournament.

== Playing career ==
=== Club ===
Born in Nova Iguaçu, Rio de Janeiro, Zinho played club football in Brazil with Flamengo, Palmeiras, Grêmio, Cruzeiro and Nova Iguaçu. He also had spells abroad with Yokohama Flügels and Miami FC. Zinho won the Campeonato Brasileiro Série A four times (twice with Palmeiras, once with Flamengo and once with Cruzeiro) and won the Campeonato Carioca three times (all with Flamengo).

=== International ===
Zinho was a member of the Brazilian 1994 FIFA World Cup winning team. He also took part at the 1993 and 1995 Copa América with Brazil, winning a runners-up medal in the latter edition of the tournament, and was also a member of the Brazilian team that finished in third place at the 1998 CONCACAF Gold Cup. He was capped a total of 55 times between March 1989 and February 1998, scoring 7 goals. On 20 January 2010 he was ranked 23rd in the USL First Division Top 25 of the Decade, which announced a list of the best and most influential players of the previous decade.

== Career statistics ==
=== Club ===
Club performance			League		Cup		League Cup		Total	
Season	Club	League	Apps	Goals	Apps	Goals	Apps	Goals	Apps	Goals
Brazil			League		Copa do Brasil		League Cup		Total	
1986	Flamengo	Série A	22	3	–		–		22	3
1987	Flamengo	Série A	19	2	–		–		19	2
1988	Flamengo	Série A	25	4	–		–		25	4
1989	Flamengo	Série A	17	0	8	1	–		25	1
1990	Flamengo	Série A	18	1	9	3	–		27	4
1991	Flamengo	Série A	7	0	–		–		7	0
1992	Flamengo	Série A	25	3	–		–		25	3
1993	Palmeiras	Série A	17	5			–		17	5
1994	Palmeiras	Série A	27	6			–		27	6
Japan			League		Emperor's Cup		J.League Cup		Total	
1995	Yokohama Flügels	J1 League	41	13	2	1	–		43	14
1996	Yokohama Flügels	J1 League	27	5	2	1	14	7	43	13
1997	Yokohama Flügels	J1 League	15	3	0	0	6	1	21	4
Brazil			League		Copa do Brasil		League Cup		Total	
1998	Palmeiras	Série A	21	1			–		21	1
1999	Palmeiras	Série A	20	3			–		20	3
2000	Grêmio	Série A	30	6			–		30	6
2001	Grêmio	Série A	21	4			–		21	4
2002	Palmeiras	Série A	16	2			–		16	2
2003	Cruzeiro	Série A	31	3			–		31	3
2004	Flamengo	Série A	31	3	7	3	–		38	6
2005	Flamengo	Série A	0	0	3	0	–		3	0
2005	Nova Iguaçu		0	0	–		–		0	0
United States			League		Open Cup		League Cup		Total	
2006	Miami	USL First Division	24	2			–		24	2
2007	Miami	USL First Division	25	5			–		25	5
Country	Brazil		347	46	27+	7+	–		374	53
Country	Japan		83	21	4	2	20	8	107	31
Country	United States		49	7			–		49	7
Total			479	74	31	9	20	8	530	91

=== International ===
Brazil national team
Year	Apps	Goals
1989	4	0
1990	0	0
1991	0	0
1992	7	1
1993	14	0
1994	13	2
1995	10	3
1996	0	0
1997	2	1
1998	5	0
Total	55	7

== Honours ==
Flamengo

- Campeonato Carioca: 1986, 1991, 2004
- Copa União: 1987
- Copa do Brasil: 1990
- Campeonato Brasileiro: 1992

Unofficial tournaments

- Colombino Trophy: 1988
- Hamburg City Tournament: 1989
- Marlboro Cup: 1990
- Sharp Cup (Japan): 1990
- Amizade Tournament: 1992

Palmeiras

- Campeonato Paulista: 1993, 1994
- Torneio Rio-São Paulo: 1993
- Campeonato Brasileiro: 1993, 1994
- Copa do Brasil: 1998
- Copa Mercosur: 1998
- Copa Libertadores: 1999
- Intercontinental Cup runner-up: 1999

Yokohama Flügels

- Asian Cup Winners' Cup: 1995
- Asian Super Cup: 1995

Grêmio

- Campeonato Gaúcho: 2001
- Copa do Brasil: 2001

Cruzeiro

- Campeonato Brasileiro: 2003
- Copa do Brasil: 2003
- Campeonato Mineiro: 2003

Nova Iguaçu

- Campeonato Carioca Second Division: 2005

Brazil

- FIFA World Cup: 1994
- Copa América runner-up: 1995
- CONCACAF Gold Cup third place: 1998

Unofficial tournaments

- Rous Cup: 1995

Individual

- Placar Bola de Prata: 1988, 1992, 1994, 1997
- South American Team of the Year: 1994

== See also ==
- List of men's footballers with the most official appearances
