= Motohiro Yamaguchi =

Japanese footballer and manager

Motohiro Yamaguchi 山口 素弘
Personal information
- Date of birth: January 29, 1969 (age 57)
- Place of birth: Takasaki, Gunma, Japan
- Height: 1.77 m (5 ft 10 in)
- Position: Midfielder

Youth career
- 1984–1986: Maebashi Ikuei High School

College career
Years	Team	Apps	(Gls)
1987–1990	Tokai University		

Senior career*
Years	Team	Apps	(Gls)
1991–1998	Yokohama Flügels	213	(30)
1999–2002	Nagoya Grampus Eight	110	(6)
2003–2005	Albirex Niigata	83	(6)
2005–2007	Yokohama FC	84	(0)
Total		490	(42)

International career
1995–1998	Japan	58	(4)

Managerial career
- 2012–2014: Yokohama FC
Medal record
Yokohama Flügels
Winner	Emperor's Cup	1993
Winner	Emperor's Cup	1998
Runner-up	Emperor's Cup	1997
Nagoya Grampus Eight
Winner	Emperor's Cup	1999
- * Club domestic league appearances and goals

Motohiro Yamaguchi (山口 素弘, Yamaguchi Motohiro; born January 29, 1969) is a Japanese football manager and former player. He played for the Japan national team.

== Club career ==
Yamaguchi was born in Takasaki on January 29, 1969. After graduating from Tokai University, he joined All Nippon Airways (later Yokohama Flügels) in 1991. The club won 1993 Emperor's Cup their first time in major title. In Asia, the club also won 1994–95 Asian Cup Winners' Cup. In 1998, the club won Emperor's Cup. However the club was disbanded end of 1998 season due to financial strain, he moved to Nagoya Grampus Eight with Seigo Narazaki in 1999. The club won 1999 Emperor's Cup. He moved to J2 League club Albirex Niigata in 2003. The club won the champions in 2003 and was promoted to J1 League. In August 2005, he moved to J2 League club Yokohama FC was founded by Yokohama Flügels supporters. The club won the champions in 2006 and was promoted to J1 League. He retired end of 2007 season. He also served as captain in all teams.

== International career ==
In January 1995, Yamaguchi was selected by the Japan national team for the 1995 King Fahd Cup. At this competition, on January 6, he debuted against Nigeria. After his debut, he became a regular player and he played most matches for Japan until the 1998 FIFA World Cup. In 1996, he played full time in all matches at 1996 AFC Asian Cup. In the 1998 FIFA World Cup qualification in 1997, he played all matches and Japan won the qualify for 1998 World Cup first time Japan's history. At the 1998 FIFA World Cup, he played full time in all three matches. These were his last appearances for Japan. He played 58 games and scored 4 goals for Japan until 1998.

== Coaching career ==
After retirement, Yamaguchi became a manager for Yokohama FC as Yasuyuki Kishino successor in March 2012. He managed the club until 2014

== Career statistics ==
=== Club ===
Appearances and goals by club, season and competition
Club	Season	League			Emperor's Cup		J.League Cup		Total	
Club	Season	Division	Apps	Goals	Apps	Goals	Apps	Goals	Apps	Goals
Yokohama Flügels (Note: "All Nippon Airways" until 1992)	1990–91	JSL Division 1	0	0	0	0	0	0	0	0
Yokohama Flügels	1991–92	JSL Division 1	22	1			1	1	23	2
Yokohama Flügels	1992	J1 League	–				6	0	6	0
Yokohama Flügels	1993	J1 League	35	3	4	0	6	1	45	4
Yokohama Flügels	1994	J1 League	34	2	2	0	1	0	37	2
Yokohama Flügels	1995	J1 League	41	3	1	0	–		42	3
Yokohama Flügels	1996	J1 League	28	8	1	0	14	5	43	13
Yokohama Flügels	1997	J1 League	19	6	5	1	1	0	25	7
Yokohama Flügels	1998	J1 League	34	7	5	0	0	0	39	7
Nagoya Grampus Eight	1999	J1 League	29	2	5	0	6	0	40	2
Nagoya Grampus Eight	2000	J1 League	28	1	2	0	6	1	36	2
Nagoya Grampus Eight	2001	J1 League	28	1	0	0	6	0	34	1
Nagoya Grampus Eight	2002	J1 League	25	2	0	0	6	0	31	2
Albirex Niigata	2003	J2 League	42	4	3	0	–		45	4
Albirex Niigata	2004	J1 League	29	2	0	0	5	0	34	2
Albirex Niigata	2005	J1 League	12	0	0	0	3	0	15	0
Yokohama FC	2005	J2 League	18	0	2	0	–		20	0
Yokohama FC	2006	J2 League	46	0	0	0	–		46	0
Yokohama FC	2007	J1 League	20	0	2	0	3	0	25	0
Career total			490	42	32	1	64	8	586	51

=== International ===
Appearances and goals by national team and year
National team	Year	Apps	Goals
Japan	1995	14	1
Japan	1996	13	2
Japan	1997	22	1
Japan	1998	9	0
Total		58	4

Scores and results list Japan's goal tally first, score column indicates score after each Yamaguchi goal.

List of international goals scored by Motohiro Yamaguchi
No.	Date	Venue	Opponent	Score	Result	Competition
1	26 February 1995	Hong Kong, United Kingdom	South Korea	2–1	2–2	1995 Dynasty Cup
2	10 February 1996	Wollongong, Australia	Australia	1–0	4–1	Friendly
3	19 February 1996	Hong Kong, UK	Poland	1–0	5–0	1996 Lunar New Year Cup
4	28 September 1997	Tokyo, Japan	South Korea	1–0	1–2	1998 FIFA World Cup qualification

== Managerial statistics ==
Team	From	To	Record				
Team	From	To	G	W	D	L	Win %
Yokohama FC	2012	2014	122	51	31	40	41.80
Total			122	51	31	40	41.80

== Honors ==
Yokohama Flügels

- Emperor's Cup: 1993, 1998
- Asian Cup Winners Cup: 1995
- Asian Super Cup: 1995

Nagoya Grampus Eight

- Emperor's Cup: 1999

Albirex Niigata

- J2 League: 2003

Individual

- J1 League Best Eleven: 1996, 1997
