= Denilson (footballer, born 1972) =

Brazilian footballer

Personal information
- Full name: Denilson Antonio Paludo
- Date of birth: October 8, 1972 (age 54)
- Place of birth: Brazil
- Height: 1.73 m (5 ft 8 in)
- Position: Midfielder

Senior career*
Years	Team	Apps	(Gls)
1996	Yokohama Flügels	3	(0)
- * Club domestic league appearances and goals

Denilson Antonio Paludo (born October 8, 1972) is a former Brazilian football player.

== Club statistics ==
Club performance			League		Cup		League Cup		Total	
Season	Club	League	Apps	Goals	Apps	Goals	Apps	Goals	Apps	Goals
Japan			League		Emperor's Cup		J.League Cup		Total	
1996	Yokohama Flügels	J1 League	3	0	1	0	8	1	12	1
Total			3	0	1	0	8	1	12	1
