= Anderson Gils =

Brazilian footballer (born 1977)

Personal information
- Full name: Anderson Gils de Sampaio
- Date of birth: February 15, 1977 (age 49)
- Place of birth: Brazil
- Height: 1.78 m (5 ft 10 in)
- Position: Forward

Senior career*
Years	Team	Apps	(Gls)
1997–1998	Yokohama Flügels	14	(3)
- * Club domestic league appearances and goals

Anderson Gils de Sampaio (born February 15, 1977) is a former Brazilian football player.

== Playing career ==
Anderson Gils joined Japanese J1 League club Yokohama Flügels in September 1997. However, he could not play at the match in 1997 season. He debuted in J1 against Yokohama Marinos during the opening match in 1998 season. He played many matches as forward in 1998 and the club won the champion's Emperor's Cup. However, the club was disbanded at the end of 1998 season due to financial strain.

== Club statistics ==
Club performance			League		Cup		League Cup		Total	
Season	Club	League	Apps	Goals	Apps	Goals	Apps	Goals	Apps	Goals
Japan			League		Emperor's Cup		J.League Cup		Total	
1997	Yokohama Flügels	J1 League	0	0	0	0	0	0	0	0
1998	Yokohama Flügels	J1 League	14	3	4	0	4	0	22	3
Total			14	3	4	0	4	0	22	3
