= 1997 Emperor's Cup =

1997 sports season

Tournament details
- Country: Japan
- Teams: 81

Final positions
- Champions: Kashima Antlers (1st title)
- Runners-up: Yokohama Flügels
- Semifinalists: Tokyo Gas; Júbilo Iwata

Statistics of Emperor's Cup in the 1997 season.

== Overview ==
It was contested by 81 teams, and Kashima Antlers won the championship.

== Results ==
=== First round ===
- Brummell Sendai 7–0 Yamaga Club
- Iwami FC 0–7 Juntendo University
- Mitsubishi Nagasaki SC 2–1 Hatsushiba Hashimoto High School
- Mito HollyHock 3–0 Hokkaido Electric Power
- Nirasaki Astros 0–2 NTT Kanto
- Mitsubishi Motors Mizushima 0–0 (PK 6–7) Yamagata FC
- Kusatsu Higashi High School 0–3 Sagan Tosu
- Nara Sangyo University 3–1 Nippon Stel Corporation Oita FC
- Saga Commercial High School 1–5 Oita Trinity
- Mind House Yokkaichi 0–3 Momoyama Gakuin University
- Kansai University 0–9 Tokyo Gas
- Ehime Youth 2–1 Alo's Hokuriku
- Blaze Kumamoto 0–2 Honda
- Kwansei Gakuin University 2–6 Albirex Niigata
- Jatco 1–0 Okinawa International University
- Kagawa Shiun Club 1–0 Waseda University
- Seino Transportation 5–0 Kochi University
- Moka High School 1–5 Kokushikan University
- Tottori 0–7 Kawasaki Frontale
- Honda Luminoso Sayama 4–1 Nippon Steel Corporation Kamaishi FC
- Kanagawa University 1–3 Ventforet Kofu
- Fukuoka University 5–1 Akita City Hall
- Aoyama Gakuin University 1–0 Denso
- FC Primeiro 0–1 Hannan University
- Maebashi Shogyo High School 0–6 Fukushima FC
- Nagoya Bank 3–4 Fukui Teachers
- Kyoiku Kenkyusha 0–5 Montedio Yamagata
- Hosho High School 3–2 Takagawa Gakuen High School
- Kagoshima Shogyo High School 1–2 Consadole Sapporo
- Hiroshima University 2–3 Aster Aomori
- Otsuka Pharmaceuticals 8–1 Teihens FC
- Ichiritsu Funabashi High School 0–2 Komazawa University

=== Second round ===
- Brummell Sendai 0–1 Juntendo University
- Verdy Kawasaki 2–0 Mitsubishi Nagasaki SC
- Mito HollyHock 1–2 Avispa Fukuoka
- NTT Kanto 1–0 Yamagata FC
- Sagan Tosu 4–0 Nara Sangyo University
- Oita Trinity 1–1 (PK 3–5) Momoyama Gakuin University
- Tokyo Gas 2–1 Ehime Youth
- Honda 3–1 Albirex Niigata
- Jatco 6–0 Kagawa Shiun Club
- Seino Transportation 1–2 Kokushikan University
- Kawasaki Frontale 3–0 Honda Luminoso Sayama
- Ventforet Kofu 2–1 Fukuoka University
- Aoyama Gakuin University 0–1 Hannan University
- Fukushima 1–0 Fukui Teachers
- Montedio Yamagata 8–0 Hosho High School
- Consadole Sapporo 4–1 Aster Aomori
- Otsuka Pharmaceuticals 1–3 Komazawa University

=== Third round ===
- Kashima Antlers 4–1 Juntendo University
- Verdy Kawasaki 0–2 Avispa Fukuoka
- Urawa Red Diamonds 2–1 NTT Kanto
- Gamba Osaka 3–2 Sagan Tosu
- Yokohama Marinos 5–0 Momoyama Gakuin University
- Nagoya Grampus Eight 1–3 Tokyo Gas
- Kyoto Purple Sanga 3–2 Honda
- Bellmare Hiratsuka 7–0 Jatco
- Kashiwa Reysol 4–1 Kokushikan University
- Vissel Kobe 2–0 Kawasaki Frontale
- Cerezo Osaka 5–1 Ventforet Kofu
- Júbilo Iwata 3–0 Hannan University
- Shimizu S-Pulse 3–0 Fukushima
- Sanfrecce Hiroshima 3–1 Montedio Yamagata
- JEF United Ichihara 1–0 Consadole Sapporo
- Yokohama Flügels 4–3 Komazawa University

=== Fourth round ===
- Kashima Antlers 6–0 Avispa Fukuoka
- Urawa Red Diamonds 1–2 Gamba Osaka
- Yokohama Marinos 1–2 Tokyo Gas
- Kyoto Purple Sanga 1–5 Bellmare Hiratsuka
- Kashiwa Reysol 2–1 Vissel Kobe
- Cerezo Osaka 2–3 Júbilo Iwata
- Shimizu S-Pulse 3–1 Sanfrecce Hiroshima
- JEF United Ichihara 1–2 Yokohama Flügels

=== Quarterfinals ===
- Kashima Antlers 3–0 Gamba Osaka
- Tokyo Gas 3–2 Bellmare Hiratsuka
- Kashiwa Reysol 1–2 Júbilo Iwata
- Shimizu S-Pulse 1–6 Yokohama Flügels

=== Semifinals ===
- Kashima Antlers 3–1 Tokyo Gas
- Júbilo Iwata 2–3 Yokohama Flügels

=== Final ===
- Kashima Antlers 3–0 Yokohama Flügels

Kashima Antlers won the championship.
