= 1998 Emperor's Cup =

Tournament details
- Country: Japan

Final positions
- Champions: Yokohama Flügels (2nd title)
- Runners-up: Shimizu S-Pulse
- Semifinalists: Kashima Antlers; Nagoya Grampus Eight

Statistics of Emperor's Cup in the 1998 season.

== Overview ==
It was contested by 82 teams, and Yokohama Flügels won the championship.

== Results ==
=== First round ===
- Omiya Ardija 1–0 TDK
- Mitsubishi Nagasaki SC 0–4 Chuo University
- FC Primeiro 1–0 Nihon University Yamagata High School
- Gifu Kogyo High School 1–2 Kagoshima Jitsugyo High School
- Kawasoe Club 0–6 Ventforet Kofu
- Nippon Steel Corporation Oita FC 1–3 Doto University
- Juntendo University 0–1 Otsuka Pharmaceuticals
- Sanwa Club 1–4 Tokushima Municipal High School
- Matsushita Electric Works FC 0–5 Denso
- Maebashi Ikuei High School 0–7 Tsukuba University
- Chukyo University 1–4 Tokyo Gas
- Tokai University 0–0 (PK 3–0) Teihens FC
- Kagawa Shiun Club 1–9 Kawasaki Frontale
- Niigata Shukyu-Kai 0–2 YKK AP SC
- Nirasaki Astros 2–3 Brummell Sendai
- Tokuyama University 2–4 Kansai University
- Kwansei Gakuin University 3–2 Shizuoka Sangyo University
- Teijin SC 0–6 Kokushikan University
- Iwami FC 1–9 Montedio Yamagata
- Meiji University 5–0 Nippon Steel Corporation Kamaishi FC
- Tenri University 2–3 Honda
- Hosho High School 4–1 Ueda Gentian
- Koga Club 0–9 Oita Trinita
- Kyushu Sangyo University 1–2 Ritsumeikan University
- Kyoiku Kenkyusha 0–4 Albirex Niigata
- Hannan University 3–2 Hatsushiba Hashimoto High School
- Gainare Tottori 0–3 Sagan Tosu
- Tochigi SC 3–2 Kumamoto Ohzu High School
- Fukuyama University 2–2 (PK 4–3) Fukui Teachers
- Sony Sendai 2–1 Aster Aomori
- Mito HollyHock 4–2 Mitsubishi Motors Mizushima
- Himawari Milk Nangoku SC 2–7 Komazawa University

=== Second round ===
- Omiya Ardija 2–0 Chuo University
- Consadole Sapporo 1–0 FC Primeiro
- Kagoshima Jitsugyo High School 0–7 Vissel Kobe
- Ventforet Kofu 6–1 Doto University
- Otsuka Pharmaceuticals 4–2 Tokushima Municipal High School
- Denso 1–3 Tsukuba University
- Tokyo Gas 2–0 Tokai University
- Kawasaki Frontale 1–0 YKK AP SC
- Brummell Sendai 2–1 Kansai University
- Kwansei Gakuin University 3–1 Kokushikan University
- Montedio Yamagata 1–0 Meiji University
- Honda FC 4–0 Hosho High School
- Oita Trinita 2–1 Ritsumeikan University
- Albirex Niigata 3–1 Hannan University
- Sagan Tosu 4–0 Tochigi SC
- Kyoto Purple Sanga 9–0 Fukuyama University
- Sony Sendai 0–5 Avispa Fukuoka
- Mito HollyHock 4–3 Komazawa University

=== Third round ===
- Júbilo Iwata 2–0 Omiya Ardija
- Consadole Sapporo 2–1 Vissel Kobe
- Cerezo Osaka 4–6 Ventforet Kofu
- Yokohama Flügels 4–2 Otsuka Pharmaceuticals
- Kashima Antlers 3–1 Tsukuba University
- Bellmare Hiratsuka 2–1 Tokyo Gas
- Sanfrecce Hiroshima 2–1 Kawasaki Frontale
- Yokohama Marinos 0–1 Brummell Sendai
- Nagoya Grampus Eight 3–1 Kwansei Gakuin University
- Gamba Osaka 1–2 Montedio Yamagata
- JEF United Ichihara 0–2 Honda FC
- Verdy Kawasaki 1–0 Oita Trinita
- Urawa Red Diamonds 4–1 Albirex Niigata
- Kashiwa Reysol 3–1 Sagan Tosu
- Kyoto Purple Sanga 2–3 Avispa Fukuoka
- Shimizu S-Pulse 5–0 Mito HollyHock

=== Fourth round ===
- Júbilo Iwata 3–2 Consadole Sapporo
- Ventforet Kofu 0–3 Yokohama Flügels
- Kashima Antlers 3–0 Bellmare Hiratsuka
- Sanfrecce Hiroshima 3–0 Brummell Sendai
- Nagoya Grampus Eight 3–2 Montedio Yamagata
- Honda FC 1–3 Verdy Kawasaki
- Urawa Red Diamonds 3–1 Kashiwa Reysol
- Avispa Fukuoka 2–3 Shimizu S-Pulse

=== Quarterfinals ===
- Júbilo Iwata 1–2 Yokohama Flügels
- Kashima Antlers 2–1 Sanfrecce Hiroshima
- Nagoya Grampus Eight 2–1 Verdy Kawasaki
- Urawa Red Diamonds 0–1 Shimizu S-Pulse

=== Semifinals ===
- Yokohama Flügels 1–0 Kashima Antlers
- Nagoya Grampus Eight 1–2 Shimizu S-Pulse

=== Final ===
- Yokohama Flügels 2–1 Shimizu S-Pulse

Yokohama Flügels won the championship.

This was the last match of Flügels as a club, as they merged with Yokohama Marinos. As a result, Shimizu took their place in the subsequent Xerox Super Cup and Asian Cup Winners' Cup competitions.
