= 2012 Kataller Toyama season =

Kataller Toyama
2012 season
- Manager: Takayoshi Amma
- J.League Division 2: –
- Emperor's Cup: –
Home colours	Away colours

The 2012 Kataller Toyama season saw Kataller Toyama compete in the J.League Division 2 for the fourth consecutive year. Kataller Toyama also competed in the 2012 Emperor's Cup.

== Competitions ==
=== J. League ===
==== League table ====
Pos	Team	Pld	W	D	L	GF	GA	GD	Pts
17	Thespa Kusatsu	42	12	11	19	31	45	−14	47
18	Avispa Fukuoka	42	9	14	19	53	68	−15	41
19	Kataller Toyama	42	9	11	22	38	59	−21	38
20	Gainare Tottori	42	11	5	26	33	78	−45	38
21	FC Gifu	42	7	14	21	27	55	−28	35

Updated to match(es) played on 11 November 2012. Source: J.League Division 2
Rules for classification: 1st points; 2nd goal differential; 3rd goals scored; 4th head-to-head results; 5th disciplinary points; 6th draw. If two clubs are tied for first place, both clubs will be declared champions.

==== Matches ====
4 March 2012 1	Fagiano Okayama	1–1	Kataller Toyama	Kanko Stadium
Sunday 15:04	Tiago 44'	Report	30' Seo	Attendance: 6,981; Referee: Oka

11 March 2012 2	Mito HollyHock	1–0	Kataller Toyama	K's denki Stadium Mito
Sunday 13:04	Ozawa 26'	Report		Attendance: 2,601; Referee: Mikami

17 March 2012 3	Kataller Toyama	1–4	Tokyo Verdy	Toyama Stadium
Saturday 16:06	Kurobe 5'	Report	10' Abe; 24' Kajikawa; 55' Iio; 78' Koike	Attendance: 3,470; Referee: Okabe

20 March 2012 4	Tochigi S.C.	0–0	Kataller Toyama	Tochigi Green Stadium
Tuesday 19:03		Report		Attendance: 2,446; Referee: Enomoto

25 March 2012 5	Kataller Toyama	2–3	Giravanz Kitakyushu	Toyama Stadium
Sunday 13:04	Nishikawa 45+2'; Kurobe 50'	Report	48' Ikemoto; 66' Watari; 85' Hanato	Attendance: 1,692; Referee: Koya

1 April 2012 6	Matsumoto Yamaga	0–3	Kataller Toyama	Matsumotodaira Park Stadium Alwin
Sunday 13:03		Report	20' Seo; 43', 62' Nishikawa	Attendance: 8,529; Referee: Yamauchi

8 April 2012 7	Kataller Toyama	1–2	Thespa Kusatsu	Toyama Stadium
Sunday 17:00	(yellow card) 18' Seo Yong-Duk; (yellow card) 29' Yoshikawa; 72' Myodo	Report	(yellow card) 34' (goal) 74' Matsushita; 37' Heberty; (yellow card) 78' Doi; (yellow card) 82' Hozaki	Attendance: 2,696; Referee: Masuya Ueda

15 April 2012 8	Montedio Yamagata	1–0	Kataller Toyama	ND Soft Stadium Yamagata
Sunday 14:00	Masaki Miyasaka (yellow card) 44'; Nishikawa 45+2'	Report	Ikehata (yellow card) 55'	Attendance: 6,460; Referee: Yosuke Kubota

22 April 2012 9	Kataller Toyama	2–3	Oita Trinita	Toyama Stadium
Sunday 17:00	Ikehata (yellow card) 10'; Fukuda 16', 48'	Report	Shimizu (yellow card) 17'; Takamatsu (yellow card) 46' (goal) 60'; Miyazawa (yellow card) 65'; Morishima 77'	Attendance: 2,003; Referee: Haruki Hidaka

27 April 2012 10	JEF United Ichihara Chiba	1–1	Kataller Toyama	Fukuda Denshi Arena
Friday 20:00	Milligan (yellow card) 57' (goal) 69'	Report	Seo Yong-Duk 79'	Attendance: 6,235; Referee: Yuki Noda

30 April 2012 11	Kataller Toyama	1–0	Gifu	Toyama Stadium
17:00	Kokeguchi 68'; Yoshii (yellow card) 70'	Report	Noda (yellow card) 53'	Attendance: 3,466; Referee: Takuto Okabe

3 May 2012 12	Gainare Tottori	1–0	Kataller Toyama	Tottori Bank Bird Stadium
17:00	Mio 29'; Okano (yellow card) 44'; Mizumoto (yellow card) 45+2'	Report	Fukuda (yellow card) 73'	Attendance: 2,551; Referee: (Japan) Koei Koya

6 May 2012 13	Kataller Toyama	1–1	Machida Zelvia	Toyama Stadium
14:00	Fukuda (yellow card) 5' (goal) 90+4'	Report	Fujita (yellow card) 43'; Suzuki 50'; Tsuda (yellow card) 73'; Marshall (yellow card) 84'; Hiramoto (yellow card) 90+1'	Attendance: 2,101; Referee: (Japan) Masuya Ueda

13 May 2012 14	Yokohama	3–0	Kataller Toyama	Nippatsu Mitsuzawa Stadium
14:00	Nakazato 34'; Takachi 50'; Sato 76'	Report	Ikehata (yellow card) 75'; Kurobe (yellow card) 77'	Attendance: 5,259; Referee: (Japan) Tomoya Maeda

20 May 2012 15	Kataller Toyama	0–1	Avispa Fukuoka	Toyama Stadium
14:00	Seo Yong-Duk (yellow card) 85'	Report	Naruoka (yellow card) 36'; Jogo 88'	Attendance: 2,978; Referee: (Japan) Nobutsugu Murakami

27 May 2012 16	Ehime	0–1	Kataller Toyama	Ningineer Stadium
20:00	Uchida (yellow card) 53'	Report	Onishi (yellow card) 26'; Kato 55'; Fukuda (yellow card) 77'; Kimura (yellow card) 87'	Attendance: 3,910; Referee: (Japan) Kazuyuki Hayakawa

2 June 2012 17	Kataller Toyama	1–1	Kyoto Sanga	Toyama Stadium
14:00	Kurobe 12'; Yoshikawa (yellow card) 43'; Kimura (yellow card) 45+3'	Report	Nakamura 44' (pen.); Akimoto (yellow card) 87'	Attendance: 3,452; Referee: (Japan) Haruki Hidaka

9 June 2012 18	Shonan Bellmare	1–0	Kataller Toyama	Shonan BMW Stadium Hiratsuka
17:00	Sakamoto (yellow card) 11'; Kobayashi (yellow card) 69'; Nakamura 90+1'	Report		Attendance: 5,148; Referee: (Japan) Hiroyoshi Takayama

13 June 2012 19	Kataller Toyama	0–1	Tokushima Vortis	Toyama Stadium
20:00	Nishino (yellow card) 41'	Report	Eto 57'	Attendance: 2,344; Referee: (Japan) Yuki Noda

17 June 2012 20	Ventforet Kofu	4–1	Kataller Toyama	Yamanashi Chuo Bank Stadium
19:00	Davi 18'; Tsuda 67'; Takasaki 70', 78'; Sasaki (yellow card) 74'	Report	Fukuda (yellow card) 39' (yellow-red card) 90'; Kimura 57'; Yoshikawa (yellow card) 66'; Onishi (yellow card) 84'	Attendance: 9,562; Referee: (Japan) Kazuyoshi Enomoto

24 June 2012 21	Kataller Toyama	0–2	Roasso Kumamoto	Toyama Stadium
19:00		Report	Saito 2'; Taketomi 37'; Hiroi (yellow card) 52'	Attendance: 3,750; Referee: (Japan) Eiji Kawai

1 July 2012 22	Oita Trinita	1–1	Kataller Toyama	Ōita Bank Dome
19:00	Mitsuhira 28' (yellow card) 70'; Murai (yellow card) 52'; Tokita (yellow card) 88'	Report	Asuke (yellow card) 19'; Seo Yong-Duk (yellow card) 31'; Fukuda 40'; Ikehata (yellow card) 61'	Attendance: 6,878; Referee: (Japan) Tetsuro Yoshida

8 July 2012 23	Kataller Toyama	1–1	Montedio Yamagata	Toyama Stadium
20:30	Ikehata (yellow card) 79'; Kato 85'; Hiraide (yellow card) 90+3'	Report	Nagata (yellow card) 31'; Ishikawa 45+3'; Nishikawa (yellow card) 90+3'	Attendance: 2,835; Referee: (Japan) Tomoya Maeda

15 July 2012 24	Gifu	2–2	Kataller Toyama	Gifu Nagaragawa Stadium
20:00	Koichi Sato 45' (yellow card) 51'; Nogaito (yellow card) 61'; Hiroki Higuchi 63'; Mita (yellow card) 65'	Report	Kimura 9'; Seo Yong-Duk 48'	Attendance: 6,313; Referee: (Japan) Naohito Ogawa

22 July 2012 25	Kataller Toyama	1–2	Tochigi S.C.	Toyama Stadium
19:00	Nishino (yellow card) 51'; Hirano 88'	Report	Paulinho (yellow card) 28'; Onodera 60'; Hirose 84'	Attendance: 3,044; Referee: (Japan) Hiromichi Oka

29 July 2012 26	Kataller Toyama	0–0	Yokohama	Toyama Stadium
19:00	Fukuda (yellow card) 25'	Report	Sugiyama (yellow card) 30'; Sato (yellow card) 51'	Attendance: 4,177; Referee: (Japan) Yuki Noda

5 August 2012 27	Tokyo Verdy	1–0	Kataller Toyama	Ajinomoto Stadium
19:00	Iio 23'	Report	Fukuda (yellow card) 57'	Attendance: 3,504; Referee: (Japan) Hiroyuki Kimura

12 August 2012 28	Kataller Toyama	1–2	Matsumoto Yamaga	Toyama Stadium
19:00	Onishi 3'; Yoshikawa (yellow card) 69'; Seo Yong-Duk (yellow card) 86'	Summary	Choi Su-Bin 65'; Funayama 71' (pen.)	Attendance: 6,549; Referee: (Japan) Konji Morikawa

19 August 2012 29	Kataller Toyama	1–1	Ventforet Kofu	Toyama Stadium
20:30	Kuniyoshi (yellow card) 4' (goal) 16'; Ikehata (yellow card) 13'	Summary	Yamamoto (red card) 27'; Kashiwa 50'	Attendance: 3,034; Referee: (Japan) Yudai Yamamoto

22 August 2012 30	Avispa Fukuoka	3–2	Kataller Toyama	Level-5 Stadium
20:00	Yamaguchi (yellow card) 35'; Oscar 67'; Okada (yellow card) 80'; Daisuke Ishizu 82', 89'	Summary	Seo Yong-Duk 7'; Asuke (yellow card) 10'; Kurobe (yellow card) 14'; Kokeguchi 77'	Attendance: 3,282; Referee: (Japan) Kazuyuki Hayakawa

26 August 2012 31	Roasso Kumamoto	3–0	Kataller Toyama	Kumamoto Athletics Stadium
20:00	Yabu 30'; Katayama 33'; Osako 90+3'	Summary	Sekihara (yellow card) 32'	Attendance: 10,530; Referee: (Japan) Yuki Noda

2 September 2012 32	Kataller Toyama	1–0	Ehime	Toyama Stadium
19:00	Hiraide (yellow card) 13'; Onishi (yellow card) 51'; Kokeguchi 80'	Summary	Sekine (yellow card) 67'; Kuba (yellow card) 72'	Attendance: 3,543; Referee: (Japan) Kenji Ogiya

14 September 2012 33	Kataller Toyama	2–0	JEF United Ichihara Chiba	Toyama Stadium
20:00	Kurobe 10', 29'; Asuke (yellow card) 42'; Kimura (yellow card) 54'; Tatsuya Morita (yellow card) 90+2'	Summary	Sakamoto (yellow card) 36'; Ricardo Lobo (yellow card) 41' (yellow-red card) 42'	Attendance: 3,161; Referee: (Japan) Minoru Tojo

17 September 2012 34	Thespa Kusatsu	0–1	Kataller Toyama	Shoda Shoyu Stadium Gunma
20:30	Goto (yellow card) 28'	Summary	Kimura (yellow card) 38' (goal) 90'; Nishikawa (yellow card) 70'; Kimoto (yellow card) 90'	Attendance: 2,949; Referee: (Japan) Taku Nagaya

23 September 2012 35	Machida Zelvia	3–2	Kataller Toyama	Machida Athletic Stadium
19:00	Gang-Jin Lee (yellow card) 27' (goal) 45'; Ota 84', 90+4'; Kitai (yellow card) 90+2'	Summary	Kato 5'; Kurobe (yellow card) 38'; Fukuda (yellow card) 76'; Nishikawa 90+4'	Attendance: 1,860; Referee: (Japan) Koei Koya

30 September 2012 36	Kataller Toyama	1–1	Fagiano Okayama	Toyama Stadium
19:00	Asuke 65'	Summary	Ishihara 61'; Ueda (yellow card) 73'	Attendance: 2,619; Referee: (Japan) Haruki Hidaka

7 October 2012 37	Kataller Toyama	2–1	Gainare Tottori	Toyama Stadium
14:00	Asahi 38'; Kokeguchi 54'; Seo Yong-Duk (yellow card) 69'	Summary	Ozaki (yellow card) 28'; Kubo 51' (yellow card) 65'	Attendance: 4,434; Referee: (Japan) Yudai Yamamoto

14 October 2012 38	Kyoto Sanga	0–1	Kataller Toyama	Nishikyogoku Athletic Stadium
17:00	Nakayama (yellow card) 80'	Summary	Fukuda (yellow card) 17'; Seo Yong-Duk (yellow card) 22'; Nishikawa 86'	Attendance: 9,046; Referee: (Japan) Jumpei Iida

21 October 2012 39	Tokushima Vortis	3–0	Kataller Toyama	Pocarisweat Stadium
19:00	Nasukawa 22'; Alex 63'; Kim Jong-Min 90'	Summary	Kato (yellow card) 53'; Asahi (yellow card) 89'	Attendance: 3,173; Referee: (Japan) Tetsuro Yoshida

28 October 2012 40	Kataller Toyama	0–2	Shonan Bellmare	Toyama Stadium
16:00	Mori (yellow card) 30'; Kokeguchi (yellow card) 38'; Takahiro Kuniyoshi (yellow card) 45+2'	Summary	Syuhei Otsuki 60'; Yuzo Iwakami 89'	Attendance: 3,205; Referee: (Japan) Koichiro Fukushima

4 November 2012 41	Giravanz Kitakyushu	1–0	Kataller Toyama	Honjō Athletic Stadium
13:00	Takeuchi 84'	Summary	Asahi (yellow card) 74'; Kurobe (yellow card) 85'	Attendance: 4,116; Referee: (Japan) Ryoichi Imamura

11 November 2012 42	Kataller Toyama	–	Mito HollyHock	Toyama Stadium
13:00				Referee: (Japan)

=== Emperor's Cup ===
9 September 2012 Round 2	Fagiano Okayama	2–0	Kataller Toyama	Okayama
13:00	Tiago 55'; Goto 77'	Report		Stadium: Kanko Stadium; Attendance: 3,277; Referee: Akihiko Ikeuchi
