= List of Japanese football transfers winter 2011–12 =

This is a list of Japanese football transfers in the winter transfer window 2011–2012 by club.

== J. League Division 1 ==
=== Albirex Niigata ===
In: Note: Flags indicate national team as defined under FIFA eligibility rules; some limited exceptions apply. Players may hold more than one non-FIFA nationality.

No.	Pos.	Nation	Player
3	DF	JPN	Kentaro Ohi (from Júbilo Iwata)
9	FW	JPN	Kisho Yano (from SC Freiburg)
13	MF	JPN	Taisuke Nakamura (on loan from Kyoto Sanga)
14	FW	JPN	Shoki Hirai (on loan from Gamba Osaka)
16	MF	KOR	Kim Young-Geun (from Soongsil University)
18	MF	BRA	Alan Mineiro (on loan from Paulista)
19	DF	KOR	Kim Jin-Su (from Kyung Hee University)
26	MF	JPN	Kenji Koyano (from Kashima Antlers)
27	FW	JPN	Bruno Castanheira (loan return from Albirex Niigata Singapore)
28	FW	JPN	Musashi Suzuki (from Kiryū Daiichi High School])
33	DF	JPN	Ryoma Nishimura (from youth academy)
—	DF	JPN	Kazunari Ono (on loan return from Ehime FC)
—	FW	JPN	Hideo Ōshima (on loan return from JEF United Chiba)

Out: Note: Flags indicate national team as defined under FIFA eligibility rules; some limited exceptions apply. Players may hold more than one non-FIFA nationality.

No.	Pos.	Nation	Player
3	DF	JPN	Kazuhiko Chiba (to Sanfrecce Hiroshima)
7	FW	BRA	Anderson (on loan to Fagiano Okayama)
9	FW	KOR	Cho Young-Cheol (to Omiya Ardija)
13	MF	JPN	Masaru Kato (on loan to Ehime FC)
18	FW	JPN	Kengo Kawamata (on loan to Fagiano Okayama)
19	DF	JPN	Ayato Hasebe (released)
24	DF	JPN	Gotoku Sakai (on loan to VfB Stuttgart)
34	DF	JPN	Yohei Iwasaki (released)
—	DF	JPN	Kazunari Ono (on loan to Shonan Bellmare)
—	DF	NZL	Michael Fitzgerald (on loan to V-Varen Nagasaki)
—	FW	JPN	Hideo Ōshima (to Consadole Sapporo)

=== Kashima Antlers ===
In: Note: Flags indicate national team as defined under FIFA eligibility rules; some limited exceptions apply. Players may hold more than one non-FIFA nationality.

No.	Pos.	Nation	Player
4	DF	JPN	Kazuya Yamamura (Drafted from Ryutsu Keizai University)
8	FW	BRA	Juninho (Transferred from Kawasaki Frontale)
11	MF	BRA	Dutra (Transferred from Kyoto Sanga F.C.)
17	FW	JPN	Ryuta Sasaki (loan return from Shonan Bellmare)
18	FW	JPN	Yoshiki Nakagawa (Promoted from youth team)
19	FW	JPN	Hideya Okamoto (Transferred from Avispa Fukuoka)
24	DF	JPN	Yukitoshi Ito (Drafted from Shizuoka Gakuen School)
26	DF	JPN	Ryuga Suzuki (Promoted from youth team)
29	GK	JPN	Shinichiro Kawamata (loan retern from Vegalta Sendai)
30	MF	JPN	Ryuta Miyauchi (Promoted from youth team)
—	DF	JPN	Tomohiko Miyazaki (loan return from Yokohama F.C.)
—	MF	JPN	Shuto Suzuki (loan return from Tochigi S.C.)

Out: Note: Flags indicate national team as defined under FIFA eligibility rules; some limited exceptions apply. Players may hold more than one non-FIFA nationality.

No.	Pos.	Nation	Player
1	GK	JPN	Tetsu Sugiyama (Transferred to Consadole Sapporo)
8	MF	JPN	Takuya Nozawa (Transferred to Vissel Kobe)
11	MF	BRA	Fellype Gabriel (Transferred to Botafogo)
18	FW	BRA	Tartá (loan return to Fluminense)
24	DF	JPN	Takefumi Toma (Transferred to Tochigi S.C.)
26	MF	JPN	Kenji Koyano (Transferred to Albirex Niigata)
30	FW	JPN	Yuzo Tashiro (Transferred to Vissel Kobe)
33	FW	BRA	Igor (Released)
—	DF	JPN	Tomohiko Miyazaki (loan to Júbilo Iwata)
—	MF	JPN	Shuto Suzuki (Transferred to Tochigi S.C.)

=== Omiya Ardija ===
In: Note: Flags indicate national team as defined under FIFA eligibility rules; some limited exceptions apply. Players may hold more than one non-FIFA nationality.

No.	Pos.	Nation	Player
2	DF	JPN	Kosuke Kikuchi (Transferred from Kawasaki Frontale)
5	MF	BRA	Carlinhos Paraíba (loan from São Paulo FC)
9	MF	KOR	Cho Young-Cheol (Transferred from Albirex Niigata)
27	FW	JPN	Masahiko Ichikawa (loan return from Tokyo Verdy)
32	FW	JPN	Yu Hasegawa (Transferred from Montedio Yamagata)
—	MF	JPN	Ryohei Arai (loan return from F.C. Gifu)

Out: Note: Flags indicate national team as defined under FIFA eligibility rules; some limited exceptions apply. Players may hold more than one non-FIFA nationality.

No.	Pos.	Nation	Player
2	DF	JPN	Taishi Tsukamoto (Retired)
7	FW	KOR	Lee Chun-Soo (Released)
9	FW	JPN	Naoki Ishihara (Transferred to Sanfrecce Hiroshima)
11	MF	JPN	Chikara Fujimoto (Transferred to Roasso Kumamoto)
25	MF	JPN	Taisuke Miyazaki (loan to Shonan Bellmare)
27	MF	JPN	Masakazu Kihara (loan to Avispa Fukuoka)
32	DF	JPN	Arata Sugiyama (Transferred to Yokohama F.C.)
37	FW	BRA	Rodrigo Pimpao (loan return to CR Vasco da Gama)
—	MF	JPN	Ryohei Arai (Transferred to Giravanz Kitakyushu)

=== Cerezo Osaka ===
In: Note: Flags indicate national team as defined under FIFA eligibility rules; some limited exceptions apply. Players may hold more than one non-FIFA nationality.

No.	Pos.	Nation	Player
5	DF	JPN	Tetsuya Funatsu (loan from Kataller Toyama)
9	FW	BRA	Kempes (loan from Portuguesa)
10	MF	BRA	Branquinho (Transferred from Atlético Paranaense)
13	MF	JPN	Yoichiro Kakitani (loan return from Tokushima Vortis)
15	MF	JPN	Takamitsu Yoshino (Drafted from Kokushikan University)
22	DF	JPN	Arata Kodama (Transferred from Shimizu S-Pulse)
23	DF	JPN	Tatsuya Yamashita (Transferred from Consadole Sapporo)
28	MF	JPN	Shota Inoue (Drafted from Hannan University)
29	MF	JPN	Kanta Goto (Drafted)
—	DF	KOR	Kim Chag-Hun (Drafted from Kwangwoon University)

Out: Note: Flags indicate national team as defined under FIFA eligibility rules; some limited exceptions apply. Players may hold more than one non-FIFA nationality.

No.	Pos.	Nation	Player
7	MF	JPN	Yohei Otake (loan return to F.C. Tokyo)
9	FW	BRA	Fabio Lopes (loan return to Icasa)
10	MF	BRA	Martinez (End of contract)
15	FW	JPN	Rui Komatsu (Transferred to Kawasaki Frontale)
22	DF	JPN	Taikai Uemoto (Transferred to Vegalta Sendai)
23	MF	JPN	Shu Kurata (loan return to Gamba Osaka)
27	GK	JPN	Kazuki Abe (loan return to Tokushima Vortis)
28	MF	JPN	Naoto Noguchi (loan to Oita Trinita)
29	DF	JPN	Ryosuke Tada (loan to Oita Trinita)
32	DF	JPN	Hiroyuki Omata (Transferred to Avispa Fukuoka)
33	DF	JPN	Yutaro Takahashi (Transferred to Roasso Kumamoto)
—	GK	JPN	Kenta Tanno (Transferred to Oita Trinita)
—	DF	KOR	Kim Chag-Hun (loan to Oita Trinita)

=== Consadole Sapporo ===
In Note: Flags indicate national team as defined under FIFA eligibility rules; some limited exceptions apply. Players may hold more than one non-FIFA nationality.

No.	Pos.	Nation	Player
3	DF	AUS	Jade North (Transferred from FC Tokyo)
5	MF	JPN	Masaki Yamamoto (Transferred from Shimizu S-Pulse)
11	FW	JPN	Shunsuke Maeda (Transferred from Oita Trinita)
14	MF	JPN	Issei Takayanagi (Transferred from Sanfrecce Hiroshima)
19	FW	BRA	Thiago Quirino (loan return from Daegu F.C.)
23	FW	JPN	Hideo Oshima (Transferred from Albirex Niigata)
27	MF	JPN	Takuma Arano (Promoted from youth team)
29	DF	JPN	Tatsuki Nara (Promoted from youth team)
30	GK	JPN	Tetsu Sugiyama (Transferred from Kashima Antlers)
31	DF	JPN	Takayuki Mae (Promoted from youth team)
33	FW	JPN	Shota Sakai (Promoted from youth team)
35	DF	JPN	Takaya Osanai (Promoted from youth team)
36	DF	BRA	Juninho (On loan from Roma Esporte Apucarana)
—	MF	JPN	Kazumasa Uesato (loan return from FC Tokyo)

Out Note: Flags indicate national team as defined under FIFA eligibility rules; some limited exceptions apply. Players may hold more than one non-FIFA nationality.

No.	Pos.	Nation	Player
5	MF	BRA	Bruno (Released)
11	FW	BRA	Diogo (Transferred to Tokushima Vortis)
23	DF	JPN	Tatsuya Yamashita (Transferred to Cerezo Osaka)
29	DF	JPN	Takuro Nishimura (Retired)
35	FW	BRA	Lemos (Transferred to Portimonense S.C.)
—	MF	JPN	Kazumasa Uesato (loan to Tokushima Vortis)
—	MF	COL	Danilson Córdoba (Transferred to Nagoya Grampus Eight)

=== Yokohama F. Marinos ===
In: Note: Flags indicate national team as defined under FIFA eligibility rules; some limited exceptions apply. Players may hold more than one non-FIFA nationality.

No.	Pos.	Nation	Player
5	DF	BRA	Dutra (Transferred from Santa Cruz)
8	MF	JPN	Kosuke Nakamachi (Transferred from Avispa Fukuoka)
11	FW	JPN	Manabu Saito (loan return from Ehime F.C.)
16	DF	JPN	Yusuke Higa (Drafted from Ryutsu Keizai University)
18	FW	BRA	Marquinhos (Transferred from Atlético Mineiro)
28	MF	JPN	Andrew Kumagai (Promoted from youth team)
27	DF	JPN	Seitaro Tomisawa (Transferred from Tokyo Verdy)
30	GK	JPN	Yuji Rokutan (Transferred from Avispa Fukuoka)
31	GK	JPN	Ryota Suzuki (Promoted from youth team)
—	DF	JPN	Masato Fujita (loan return from Yokohama F.C.)
—	DF	KOR	Jeong Dong-Ho (loan return from Gainare Tottori)
—	MF	JPN	Kota Mizunuma (loan return from Tochigi S.C.)

Out: Note: Flags indicate national team as defined under FIFA eligibility rules; some limited exceptions apply. Players may hold more than one non-FIFA nationality.

No.	Pos.	Nation	Player
5	DF	KOR	Kim Kun-Hoan (loan to Sagan Tosu)
8	MF	JPN	Aria Jasuru Hasegawa (Transferred to F.C. Tokyo)
9	FW	JPN	Kazuma Watanabe (Transferred to F.C. Tokyo)
15	FW	JPN	Jin Hanato (Loan to Giravanz Kitakyushu)
16	DF	JPN	Eijiro Takeda (Loan to JEF United Ichihara Chiba)
20	DF	JPN	Yasuhiro Hato (Retired)
31	GK	JPN	Yota Akimoto (Transferred to Ehime F.C.)
—	DF	JPN	Masato Fujita (Transferred to Kashiwa Reysol)
—	DF	KOR	Jeong Dong-Ho (loan to Hangzhou Greentown)
—	MF	JPN	Kota Mizunuma (loan to Sagan Tosu)

=== Kawasaki Frontale ===
In Note: Flags indicate national team as defined under FIFA eligibility rules; some limited exceptions apply. Players may hold more than one non-FIFA nationality.

No.	Pos.	Nation	Player
5	DF	BRA	Jeci (loan from Coritiba)
10	MF	BRA	Renato (loan from Coritiba)
17	FW	JPN	Rui Komatsu (Transferred from Cerezo Osaka)
18	MF	JPN	Kyohei Sugiura (loan return from Ehime F.C.)
21	GK	JPN	Yohei Nishibe (Transferred from Shonan Bellmare)
25	MF	BRA	René Santos (loan from Grêmio)
28	FW	JPN	Junichi Tanaka (Drafted from Osaka Toin High School)
29	GK	JPN	Shun Takagi (Drafted from Meiji University)
33	DF	JPN	Shun Morishita (Transferred from Kyoto Sanga F.C.)
—	MF	JPN	Yuji Yabu (loan return from Ventforet Kofu)

Out Note: Flags indicate national team as defined under FIFA eligibility rules; some limited exceptions apply. Players may hold more than one non-FIFA nationality.

No.	Pos.	Nation	Player
1	GK	JPN	Takashi Aizawa (Transferred to Machida Zelvia)
5	DF	JPN	Jun Sonoda (loan to Machida Zelvia)
10	FW	BRA	Juninho (Transferred to Kashima Antlers)
17	DF	JPN	Kosuke Kikuchi (Transferred to Omiya Ardija)
18	MF	JPN	Tomonobu Yokoyama (Transferred to Cerezo Osaka)
21	FW	JPN	Yuki Natsume (loan to Tochigi S.C.)
25	DF	JPN	Yuki Yoshida (Retired)
26	GK	JPN	Takuya Matsumoto (loan return to Shonan Bellmare)
29	FW	JPN	Satoshi Kukino (Transferred to Tochigi S.C.)
—	MF	JPN	Yuji Yabu (Transferred to Roasso Kumamoto)

=== Gamba Osaka ===
In: Note: Flags indicate national team as defined under FIFA eligibility rules; some limited exceptions apply. Players may hold more than one non-FIFA nationality.

No.	Pos.	Nation	Player
5	DF	JPN	Daiki Niwa (loan return from Avispa Fukuoka)
11	FW	BRA	Paulinho (Transferred from Ventforet Kofu)
13	MF	JPN	Shinichi Terada (loan return from Yokohama FC)
14	MF	JPN	Shu Kurata (loan return from Cerezo Osaka)
15	DF	JPN	Yasuyuki Konno (Transferred from F.C. Tokyo)
20	FW	JPN	Akihiro Sato (Transferred from Tokushima Vortis)
22	GK	JPN	Yohei Takeda (loan from Shimizu S-Pulse)
25	MF	JPN	Hiroyuki Abe (Drafted from Kwansei Gakuin University)
26	DF	JPN	Takaharu Nishino (Promoted from youth team)
28	DF	JPN	Katsuhisa Inamori (Promoted from youth team)
30	DF	BRA	Eduardo (loan from Taboão da Serra)
31	GK	JPN	Ken Tajiri (Promoted from youth team)
37	FW	KOR	Lee Seung-Yeoul (Transferred from FC Seoul)
—	DF	JPN	Shunya Suganuma (loan return from Roasso Kumamoto)

Out: Note: Flags indicate national team as defined under FIFA eligibility rules; some limited exceptions apply. Players may hold more than one non-FIFA nationality.

No.	Pos.	Nation	Player
4	DF	JPN	Kazumichi Takagi (Transferred to Vissel Kobe)
5	DF	JPN	Satoshi Yamaguchi (Transferred to JEF United Chiba)
6	DF	JPN	Takumi Shimohira (Transferred to Omiya Ardija)
13	MF	KOR	Kim Seung-Yong (Transferred to Ulsan Hyundai)
14	FW	JPN	Shoki Hirai (loan to Albirex Niigata)
16	FW	JPN	Shouhei Otsuka (loan to JEF United Chiba)
19	GK	JPN	Kohei Kawata (loan to Avispa Fukuoka)
22	FW	KOR	Lee Keun-Ho (Transferred to Ulsan Hyundai)
26	GK	JPN	Yoichi Futori (Transferred to Tokyo Verdy)
27	MF	JPN	Hideo Hashimoto (Transferred to Vissel Kobe)
33	FW	BRA	Afonso (loan return to Corinthians Alagoano)
—	DF	JPN	Shunya Suganuma (loan to Júbilo Iwata)

=== Nagoya Grampus ===
In: Note: Flags indicate national team as defined under FIFA eligibility rules; some limited exceptions apply. Players may hold more than one non-FIFA nationality.

No.	Pos.	Nation	Player
17	FW	JPN	Yuki Maki (loan return from Shonan Bellmare)
20	MF	COL	Danilson Córdoba (Transferred from Consadole Sapporo)
22	DF	BRA	Daniel (Transferred from Ventforet Kofu)
23	DF	JPN	Yōsuke Ishibitsu (Transferred from Vissel Kobe)
27	MF	JPN	Ryouta Tanabe (Drafted from Mitsubishi Yowa Youth)
29	DF	JPN	Kazuki Sato (Promoted from youth team)
30	MF	JPN	Taisuke Mizuno (Promoted from youth team)
31	FW	JPN	Miki Takahara (Promoted from youth team)
—	MF	JPN	Yoshiki Hiraki (loan return from Shonan Bellmare)

Out: Note: Flags indicate national team as defined under FIFA eligibility rules; some limited exceptions apply. Players may hold more than one non-FIFA nationality.

No.	Pos.	Nation	Player
3	DF	JPN	Mitsuru Chiyotanda (Transferred to Júbilo Iwata)
22	MF	JPN	Koji Hashimoto (Transferred to Mito HollyHock)
23	DF	JPN	Genta Matsuo (Transferred to Kyoto Sanga F.C.)
27	MF	JPN	Sho Hanai (Transferred to Tokushima Vortis)
29	FW	JPN	Hikaru Kuba (Transferred to Ehime F.C.)
—	GK	JPN	Toru Hasegawa (Transferred to Tokushima Vortis)
—	DF	JPN	Akira Takeuchi (Transferred to JEF United Chiba)
—	MF	JPN	Yoshiki Hiraki (Transferred to Blaublitz Akita)
—	FW	JPN	Tomohiro Tsuda (Transferred to Tokushima Vortis)

=== Júbilo Iwata ===
In: Note: Flags indicate national team as defined under FIFA eligibility rules; some limited exceptions apply. Players may hold more than one non-FIFA nationality.

No.	Pos.	Nation	Player
4	DF	JPN	Mitsuru Chiyotanda (Transferred from Nagoya Grampus)
8	FW	KOR	Baek Sung-Dong (Drafted from Yonsei University)
11	MF	JPN	Takuya Matsuura (loan return from Avispa Fukuoka)
13	DF	JPN	Tomohiko Miyazaki (loan from Kashima Antlers)
14	FW	JPN	Yuki Oshitani (loan return from F.C. Gifu)
22	DF	JPN	Shunya Suganuma (loan from Gamba Osaka)
24	DF	KOR	Cho Byung-Kuk (Transferred from Vegalta Sendai)
25	DF	JPN	Nagisa Sakurauchi (Drafted from Kansai University)
26	MF	JPN	Ryosuke Matsuoka (Transferred from Vissel Kobe)
27	DF	JPN	Takaaki Kinoshita (Drafted from Hamamatsu Kaiseikan High School)
30	FW	JPN	Yoshiro Abe (Transferred from Shonan Bellmare)
—	DF	JPN	Kentaro Ohi (loan return from Shonan Bellmare)

Out: Note: Flags indicate national team as defined under FIFA eligibility rules; some limited exceptions apply. Players may hold more than one non-FIFA nationality.

No.	Pos.	Nation	Player
2	DF	JPN	Kenichi Kaga (Transferred to F.C. Tokyo)
3	DF	JPN	Ryu Okada (loan to Avispa Fukuoka)
6	MF	JPN	Daisuke Nasu (Transferred to Kashiwa Reysol)
8	FW	BRA	Gilsihno (Transferred to Corinthians)
11	MF	JPN	Norihiro Nishi (Transferred to Tokyo Verdy)
13	DF	KOR	Lee Gang-Jin (Transferred to Jeonbuk Hyundai Motors)
19	FW	JPN	Tomoyuki Arata (loan to JEF United Chiba)
28	MF	JPN	Keisuke Funatani (Transferred to Sagan Tosu)
30	DF	JPN	Shinnosuke Honda (Transferred to Buriram United)
50	DF	JPN	Masahiro Koga (Transferred to Avispa Fukuoka)
—	DF	JPN	Kentaro Ohi (Transferred to Albirex Niigata)

=== Urawa Red Diamonds ===
In Note: Flags indicate national team as defined under FIFA eligibility rules; some limited exceptions apply. Players may hold more than one non-FIFA nationality.

No.	Pos.	Nation	Player
16	FW	BRA	Popó (Transferred from Vissel Kobe)
20	DF	JPN	Tomoaki Makino (loan from 1. FC Köln)
22	MF	JPN	Yuki Abe (Transferred from Leicester City)
23	MF	JPN	Masaya Nozaki (Promoted from youth team)
29	MF	JPN	Shinya Yajima (Promoted from youth team)
—	DF	JPN	Shunsuke Tsutsumi (loan return from Tochigi S.C.)

Out Note: Flags indicate national team as defined under FIFA eligibility rules; some limited exceptions apply. Players may hold more than one non-FIFA nationality.

No.	Pos.	Nation	Player
16	FW	JPN	Hiroyuki Takasaki (Transferred to Ventforet Kofu)
20	DF	JPN	Satoshi Horinouchi (Transferred to Yokohama F.C.)
21	FW	JPN	Kazuki Hara (loan to Kyoto Sanga F.C.)
23	MF	JPN	Jun Aoyama (loan to Tokushima Vortis)
29	FW	BRA	Mazola (loan return to São Paulo FC)
—	DF	JPN	Shunsuke Tsutsumi (Transferred to Avispa Fukuoka)

=== Shimizu S-Pulse ===
In: Note: Flags indicate national team as defined under FIFA eligibility rules; some limited exceptions apply. Players may hold more than one non-FIFA nationality.

No.	Pos.	Nation	Player
9	FW	BRA	Jymmy França (loan from FC Sheriff Tiraspol)
16	MF	JPN	Kohei Hattanda (Drafted from University of Tsukuba)
17	MF	JPN	Yosuke Kawai (Drafted from Keio University)
23	FW	JPN	Ryohei Shirasaki (Drafted from Yamanashi Gakuin High School)
25	DF	JPN	Tomoya Inukai (Promoted from youth team)
26	FW	JPN	Satoru Kashiwase (Promoted from youth team)
28	DF	JPN	Yutaka Yoshida (Transferred from Ventforet Kofu)
30	DF	PRK	Kang Song-Ho (Transferred from Oita Trinita)
31	GK	JPN	Akihiro Hayashi (Transferred from R.O.C. de Charleroi-Marchienne)
32	MF	JPN	Hideki Ishige (Promoted from youth team)
33	DF	KOR	Lee Ki-Je (Drafted from Dongkuk University)
—	GK	JPN	Yohei Takeda (loan return from Albirex Niigata)
—	FW	JPN	Shun Nagasawa (loan return from Roasso Kumamoto)

Out: Note: Flags indicate national team as defined under FIFA eligibility rules; some limited exceptions apply. Players may hold more than one non-FIFA nationality.

No.	Pos.	Nation	Player
2	DF	JPN	Arata Kodama (Transferred to Cerezo Osaka)
4	DF	JPN	Kosuke Ota (Transferred to F.C. Tokyo)
7	MF	JPN	Masaki Yamamoto (Transferred to Consadole Sapporo)
9	FW	JPN	Yuichiro Nagai (Transferred to Yokohama F.C.)
9	MF	SWE	Freddie Ljungberg (End of contract)
16	FW	JPN	Yu Kijima (Transferred to Oita Trinita)
17	DF	AUS	Eddy Bosnar (Transferred to Suwon Bluewings)
22	FW	JPN	Hiroki Higuchi (loan to F.C. Gifu)
25	DF	JPN	Naoya Okane (loan to Montedio Yamagata)
28	MF	JPN	Ryo Takeuchi (loan to Giravanz Kitakyushu)
—	GK	JPN	Yohei Takeda (loan to Gamba Osaka)
—	FW	JPN	Shun Nagasawa (loan to Kyoto Sanga F.C.)

=== F.C. Tokyo ===
In Note: Flags indicate national team as defined under FIFA eligibility rules; some limited exceptions apply. Players may hold more than one non-FIFA nationality.

No.	Pos.	Nation	Player
5	DF	JPN	Kenichi Kaga (Transferred from Júbilo Iwata)
6	DF	JPN	Kosuke Ota (Transferred from Shimizu S-Pulse)
8	MF	JPN	Aria Jasuru Hasegawa (Transferred from Yokohama F. Marinos)
11	FW	JPN	Kazuma Watanabe (Transferred from Yokohama F. Marinos)
16	DF	JPN	Yuichi Maruyama (Drafted from Meiji University)
17	MF	JPN	Hiroki Kawano (Transferred from Tokyo Verdy)
19	MF	JPN	Yohei Otake (loan return from Cerezo Osaka)
23	FW	JPN	Yohei Hayashi (Drafted from Chuo University)
24	FW	JPN	Kentaro Shigematsu (loan return from Avispa Fukuoka)
28	MF	JPN	Shuto Kono (loan return from Oita Trinita)
30	DF	KOR	Jang Hyun-Soo (Drafted from Yonsei University)
37	MF	JPN	Kento Hashimoto (Promoted from youth team)

Out Note: Flags indicate national team as defined under FIFA eligibility rules; some limited exceptions apply. Players may hold more than one non-FIFA nationality.

No.	Pos.	Nation	Player
6	DF	JPN	Yasuyuki Konno (Transferred to Gamba Osaka)
9	FW	BRA	Roberto César (loan to Coritiba)
11	FW	JPN	Tatsuya Suzuki (Transferred to Tokushima Vortis)
17	MF	JPN	Genki Nagasato (loan return to Ventforet Kofu)
26	DF	JPN	Takumi Abe (loan to Yokohama F.C.)
30	FW	JPN	Daiki Takamatsu (loan return to Oita Trinita)
32	MF	JPN	Kazumasa Uesato (loan return to Consadole Sapporo)
34	DF	JPN	Tomokazu Nagira (Transferred to Gainare Tottori)
36	DF	AUS	Jade North (Transferred to Consadole Sapporo)
38	FW	JPN	Daisuke Sakata (Transferred to Avispa Fukuoka)
—	MF	JPN	Toshihiro Matsushita (Transferred to Vegalta Sendai)
—	MF	JPN	Kota Morimura (Transferred to Giravanz Kitakyushu)

=== Vegalta Sendai ===
In Note: Flags indicate national team as defined under FIFA eligibility rules; some limited exceptions apply. Players may hold more than one non-FIFA nationality.

No.	Pos.	Nation	Player
7	MF	JPN	Hiroaki Okuno (Drafted from Sendai University)
8	MF	JPN	Toshihiro Matsushita (Transferred from F.C. Tokyo)
14	MF	BRA	Deyvid Sacconi (Transferred from Palmeiras)
18	FW	BRA	Wilson (Transferred from Shaanxi Chan-Ba)
20	DF	JPN	Toshihiko Uchiyama (Transferred from Ventforet Kofu)
26	MF	JPN	Keita Fujimura (Drafted from Morioka Shogyo High School)
29	DF	JPN	Taikai Uemoto (Transferred from Cerezo Osaka)
30	MF	JPN	Yuta Echigo (Promoted from youth team)

Out Note: Flags indicate national team as defined under FIFA eligibility rules; some limited exceptions apply. Players may hold more than one non-FIFA nationality.

No.	Pos.	Nation	Player
4	DF	JPN	Junya Hosokawa (Released)
5	DF	KOR	Cho Byung-Kuk (Transferred to Júbilo Iwata)
13	FW	JPN	Yuki Nakashima (loan to Montedio Yamagata)
14	MF	JPN	Yoshiki Takahashi (loan to Sagan Tosu)
18	FW	BRA	Diego (Loan return to Kyoto Sanga F.C.)
20	MF	BRA	Max (Released)
21	GK	JPN	Shinichiro Kawamata (loan return to Kashima Antlers)
26	FW	JPN	Goshi Okubo (Transferred to Sony Sendai F.C.)
29	DF	JPN	Toshio Shimakawa (loan to Tokyo Verdy)

=== Vissel Kobe ===
In: Note: Flags indicate national team as defined under FIFA eligibility rules; some limited exceptions apply. Players may hold more than one non-FIFA nationality.

No.	Pos.	Nation	Player
1	GK	JPN	Yuki Uekusa (Transferred from Montedio Yamagata)
8	MF	JPN	Takuya Nozawa (Transferred from Kashima Antlers)
11	FW	JPN	Yuzo Tashiro (Transferred from Kashima Antlers)
19	DF	JPN	Masahiko Inoha (Transferred from Hajduk Split)
22	DF	JPN	Kazumichi Takagi (Transferred from Gamba Osaka)
23	DF	KOR	Lee Kwang-Seon (Drafted from Kyunghee University)
25	MF	JPN	Ryo Okui (Drafted from Waseda University)
27	MF	JPN	Hideo Hashimoto (Transferred from Gamba Osaka)
—	DF	JPN	Masaki Yanagawa (loan return from Thespa Kusatsu)
—	MF	JPN	Ryuji Hirota (Promoted from youth team)

Out: Note: Flags indicate national team as defined under FIFA eligibility rules; some limited exceptions apply. Players may hold more than one non-FIFA nationality.

No.	Pos.	Nation	Player
1	GK	JPN	Takahide Kishi (loan to Gainare Tottori)
8	MF	JPN	Ryosuke Matsuoka (Transferred to Júbilo Iwata)
9	MF	BRA	Rogerinho (Transferred to Ceará)
10	MF	BRA	Botti (Transferred to Figueirense)
11	MF	BRA	Popó (Transferred to Urawa Red Diamonds)
14	DF	JPN	Tsuneyasu Miyamoto (Retired)
16	MF	JPN	Akihito Kusunose (Transferred to Matsumoto Yamaga)
19	FW	JPN	Koki Arita (loan to Ehime F.C.)
22	MF	JPN	Kenji Baba (Transferred to Shonan Bellmare)
25	DF	JPN	Yosuke Ishibitsu (Transferred to Nagoya Grampus)
26	FW	JPN	Kohei Mishima (Transferred to Mito HollyHock)
—	DF	JPN	Masaki Yanagawa (Transferred to Tochigi S.C.)
—	MF	JPN	Ryuji Hirota (loan to F.C. Gifu)

== J. League Division 2 ==
=== Gainare Tottori ===
In: Note: Flags indicate national team as defined under FIFA eligibility rules; some limited exceptions apply. Players may hold more than one non-FIFA nationality.

No.	Pos.	Nation	Player
6	DF	JPN	Tomokazu Nagira (Transferred from F.C. Tokyo)
11	FW	CRC	Kenny Cunningham (Transferred from A.D. San Carlos)
19	FW	JPN	Takahiko Sumida (Transferred from Oita Trinita)
20	DF	CRC	Roy Smith (Transferred from Orión F.C.)
21	GK	JPN	Takahide Kishi (on loan from Vissel Kobe)
24	MF	JPN	Keisuke Kumazawa (Drafted from Chukyo University)
27	DF	JPN	Osamu Miura (Drafted from Doshisha University)
33	GK	JPN	Takuya Sugimoto (Drafted from Nihon University)

Out: Note: Flags indicate national team as defined under FIFA eligibility rules; some limited exceptions apply. Players may hold more than one non-FIFA nationality.

No.	Pos.	Nation	Player
—	MF	JPN	Toshihiro Hattori (Transferred to F.C. Gifu)
—	FW	JPN	Naoya Umeda (Transferred to F.C. Gifu)
—	FW	JPN	Yutaro Abe (Retired)
—	DF	JPN	Tatsuyuki Tomiyama (Retired)
—	GK	JPN	Daisuke Tada (loan to F.C. Gifu)
—	DF	JPN	Yasushi Kita (Retired)
—	DF	KOR	Jeong Dong-Ho (loan return to Yokohama F. Marinos)
—	FW	CIV	Hamed Koné (Released)

=== JEF United Chiba ===
In Note: Flags indicate national team as defined under FIFA eligibility rules; some limited exceptions apply. Players may hold more than one non-FIFA nationality.

No.	Pos.	Nation	Player
3	DF	JPN	Akira Takeuchi (Definitive transfer from Nagoya Grampus)
5	DF	JPN	Satoshi Yamaguchi (Transferred from Gamba Osaka)
6	DF	AUS	Mark Milligan (Loan return from Melbourne Victory)
10	FW	BRA	Reginaldo (On loan from A. C. Siena)
14	FW	JPN	Tomoyuki Arata (On loan from Jubilo Iwata)
15	MF	JPN	Akihiro Hyodo (On loan from Kashiwa Reysol)
18	FW	JPN	Yoshihito Fujita (Transferred from Yokohama F.C.)
19	FW	JPN	Yusuke Tanaka (Transferred from Avispa Fukuoka)
23	DF	JPN	Eijiro Takeda (On loan from Yokohama F. Marinos)
25	MF	JPN	Sho Sato (Promoted from JEF United Chiba U18)
26	MF	JPN	Haruya Ide (Promoted from JEF United Chiba U18)
28	MF	JPN	Yamato Machida (Drafted from Senshu University)
29	DF	JPN	Kazuki Oiwa (Drafted from Chuo University)
30	FW	JPN	Akira Toshima (Loan return from JEF Reserves)
32	FW	JPN	Shohei Otsuka (On loan from Gamba Osaka)

Out Note: Flags indicate national team as defined under FIFA eligibility rules; some limited exceptions apply. Players may hold more than one non-FIFA nationality.

No.	Pos.	Nation	Player
6	MF	NED	Sander van Gessel (end of contract)
10	MF	CAN	Matthew Lam (Loan return to FC Edmonton)
14	MF	JPN	Keisuke Ota (Transferred to Tokushima Vortis)
15	DF	JPN	Yohei Fukumoto (Transferred to Tokushima Vortis)
16	MF	JPN	Takenori Hayashi (End of contract)
18	FW	JPN	Kota Aoki (On loan to Ventforet Kofu)
19	MF	JPN	Shinji Murai (Transferred to Oita Trinita)
28	MF	JPN	Toshiya Fujita (end of contract)
31	FW	JPN	Hideo Oshima (Transferred to Consadole Sapporo)
33	DF	JPN	Takayuki Chano (Retired)
—	MF	JPN	Masaki Chugo (Transferred to Tokyo Verdy)
—	MF	JPN	Tsukasa Masuyama (On loan to Matsumoto Yamaga F.C.)

=== Kataller Toyama ===
In Note: Flags indicate national team as defined under FIFA eligibility rules; some limited exceptions apply. Players may hold more than one non-FIFA nationality.

No.	Pos.	Nation	Player
27	DF	JPN	Kenta Yoshikawa (Transferred from Ehime F.C.)
14	MF	JPN	Yukihiro Yamase (Transferred from Sagan Tosu)
18	MF	JPN	Koken Kato (Transferred from Kyoto Sanga F.C.)
29	MF	JPN	Kazuya Myodo (Transferred from Pattaya United F.C.)
28	FW	JPN	Yudai Nishikawa (Transferred from F.C. Gifu)
30	FW	JPN	Shota Kimura (Transferred from Matsumoto Yamaga F.C.)

Out Note: Flags indicate national team as defined under FIFA eligibility rules; some limited exceptions apply. Players may hold more than one non-FIFA nationality.

No.	Pos.	Nation	Player
1	GK	JPN	Keisuke Naito (Transferred to Thespa Kusatsu)
4	DF	JPN	Kenjiro Ezoe (Released)
5	MF	JPN	Tetsuya Funatsu (On loan to Cerezo Osaka)
26	MF	JPN	Takamasa Sakai (On loan to Kamatamare Sanuki)
11	FW	JPN	Yuya Nagatomi (Retired)
22	FW	JPN	Yusuke Tanahashi (On loan to F.C. Ryūkyū)

=== Machida Zelvia ===
In Note: Flags indicate national team as defined under FIFA eligibility rules; some limited exceptions apply. Players may hold more than one non-FIFA nationality.

No.	Pos.	Nation	Player
26	MF	SCO	Colin Marshall (from (Iceland) Víkingur)

Out Note: Flags indicate national team as defined under FIFA eligibility rules; some limited exceptions apply. Players may hold more than one non-FIFA nationality.

No.	Pos.	Nation	Player
