= Yōsuke Ikehata =

Japanese footballer

Yosuke Ikehata 池端 陽介
Personal information
- Full name: Yosuke Ikehata
- Date of birth: June 7, 1979 (age 47)
- Place of birth: Hamamatsu, Japan
- Height: 1.81 m (5 ft 11 1/2 in)
- Position: Defender

Youth career
- 1995–1997: Shimizu Commercial High School

Senior career*
Years	Team	Apps	(Gls)
1998–1999	Sanfrecce Hiroshima	4	(0)
2000	Verdy Kawasaki	4	(0)
2001	Oita Trinita	24	(0)
2002–2010	Ventforet Kofu	217	(7)
2011–2015	Kataller Toyama	97	(0)
2016–2018	Okinawa SV		
Total		346	(7)
Medal record
Sanfrecce Hiroshima
Runner-up	Emperor's Cup	1999
- * Club domestic league appearances and goals

Yosuke Ikehata (池端 陽介, Ikehata Yōsuke; born June 7, 1979) is a Japanese football player.

== Playing career ==
Ikehata was born in Hamamatsu on June 7, 1979. After graduating from Shimizu Commercial High School, he joined the J1 League club Sanfrecce Hiroshima in 1998. Although he debuted as center back in first season, he did not play much. In 1999, he moved to Verdy Kawasaki. However he did not play much there either. In 2001, he moved to the J2 League club Oita Trinita. He became a regular center back in mid-2001. In 2002, he moved to the J2 club Ventforet Kofu. He played as regular center back for a long time and the club was promoted to J1 in 2006. However he lost his regular position in 2006. Although he became a regular player again in late 2007, the club was relegated to J2 in 2008. In 2010, he did not play at all. In 2011, he moved to Kataller Toyama. Although he played in many matches at first, his playing time gradually decreased in 2014 and the club was relegated to the J3 League in 2015. In 2016, he moved to the Prefectural Leagues club Okinawa SV. The club was promoted to the Regional Leagues in 2018. He left the club at the end of the 2018 season.

== Career statistics ==
Appearances and goals by club, season and competition
Club	Season	League			Emperor's Cup		J.League Cup		Total	
Club	Season	Division	Apps	Goals	Apps	Goals	Apps	Goals	Apps	Goals
Sanfrecce Hiroshima	1998	J1 League	4	0	0	0	0	0	4	0
Sanfrecce Hiroshima	1999	J1 League	0	0	0	0	1	0	1	0
Verdy Kawasaki	2000	J1 League	4	0	0	0	1	1	5	1
Oita Trinita	2001	J2 League	24	0	3	1	2	0	29	1
Ventforet Kofu	2002	J2 League	36	1	3	0	—		39	1
Ventforet Kofu	2003	J2 League	37	2	3	0	—		40	2
Ventforet Kofu	2004	J2 League	36	0	1	0	—		37	0
Ventforet Kofu	2005	J2 League	27	1	0	0	—		27	1
Ventforet Kofu	2006	J1 League	3	0	0	0	1	0	4	0
Ventforet Kofu	2007	J1 League	19	0	2	0	3	0	24	0
Ventforet Kofu	2008	J2 League	28	0	1	0	—		29	0
Ventforet Kofu	2009	J2 League	29	3	1	0	—		30	3
Ventforet Kofu	2010	J2 League	2	0	2	0	—		3	0
Kataller Toyama	2011	J2 League	26	0	2	0	—		28	0
Kataller Toyama	2012	J2 League	29	0	1	0	—		30	0
Kataller Toyama	2013	J2 League	22	0	1	0	—		23	0
Kataller Toyama	2014	J2 League	13	0	0	0	—		13	0
Kataller Toyama	2015	J3 League	7	0	—		—		7	0
Career total			346	7	19	1	8	1	373	9
