= Yoshikawa (disambiguation) =

Yoshikawa is a city in Saitama Prefecture, Japan

Yoshikawa may also refer to:

== Places ==
- Yoshikawa, Kōchi, a former village in Kami District, Kōchi Prefecture, Japan
- Yoshikawa, Niigata, a former town in Nakakubiki District, Niigata Prefecture, Japan

== Other uses ==
- Yoshikawa (surname), a Japanese surname
- Yoshikawa Station (disambiguation), multiple railway stations in Japan
- 5237 Yoshikawa, a main-belt asteroid
