= Naohito Hirai =

Japanese footballer

Naohito Hirai 平井 直人
Personal information
- Full name: Naohito Hirai
- Date of birth: July 16, 1978 (age 48)
- Place of birth: Kyoto, Kyoto, Japan
- Height: 1.83 m (6 ft 0 in)
- Position: Goalkeeper

Youth career
- 1994–1996: Kyoto Purple Sanga

Senior career*
Years	Team	Apps	(Gls)
1997–2010	Kyoto Sanga FC	213	(0)
2017	Renofa Yamaguchi FC	0	(0)
2018	Kataller Toyama	0	(0)
Total		213	(0)
Medal record
Kyoto Sanga FC
Winner	Emperor's Cup	2002
- * Club domestic league appearances and goals

Naohito Hirai (平井 直人, Hirai Naohito; born July 16, 1978) is a former Japanese football player.

== Playing career ==
Hirai was born in Kyoto on July 16, 1978. He joined J1 League club Kyoto Purple Sanga (later Kyoto Sanga FC) in 1997. He could not play at all in the match behind Shigetatsu Matsunaga until early 2000. He became a regular goalkeeper from the middle of 2000. However the club was relegated to J2 League end of 2000 season. Although he lost regular position behind Masahiko Nakagawa from the middle of 2001, the club returned to J1 League in a year. From 2002, he became a regular goalkeeper again and the club won the champions 2002 Emperor's Cup first major title in club history. After that, although the club results were bad, he played many matches until 2007. However the club gained Yuichi Mizutani in 2008 and Hirai he could hardly play in the match behind Mizutani. He retired end of 2010 season. In September 2017, when he coached Renofa Yamaguchi FC, he was registered as player because many goalkeeper could not play in the match. However he did not play in the match and his registration was deleted a week later. In March 2018, when he coached Kataller Toyama, he was registered as player because many goalkeeper could not play for injury. However he did not play in the match and his registration was deleted in April.

== Coaching career ==
After retirement, Hirai started coaching career at Kyoto Sanga FC in 2011. He served as goalkeeper coach until 2012. In 2013, he moved to Ehime FC and coached until 2014. In 2015, he returned to Kyoto. In 2017, he moved to Renofa Yamaguchi FC. In 2018, he moved to Kataller Toyama.

== Career statistics ==
Appearances and goals by club, season and competition
Club	Season	League			Emperor's Cup		J.League Cup		Total	
Club	Season	Division	Apps	Goals	Apps	Goals	Apps	Goals	Apps	Goals
Kyoto Purple Sanga	1997	J1 League	0	0	0	0	0	0	0	0
Kyoto Purple Sanga	1998	J1 League	0	0	0	0	0	0	0	0
Kyoto Purple Sanga	1999	J1 League	0	0	0	0	0	0	0	0
Kyoto Purple Sanga	2000	J1 League	15	0	1	0	8	0	24	0
Kyoto Purple Sanga	2001	J2 League	15	0	0	0	0	0	15	0
Kyoto Purple Sanga	2002	J1 League	26	0	5	0	6	0	37	0
Kyoto Purple Sanga	2003	J1 League	28	0	1	0	4	0	33	0
Kyoto Purple Sanga	2004	J2 League	26	0	1	0	—		27	0
Kyoto Purple Sanga	2005	J2 League	39	0	0	0	—		39	0
Kyoto Purple Sanga	2006	J1 League	18	0	0	0	4	0	22	0
Kyoto Sanga FC	2007	J2 League	33	0	0	0	—		33	0
Kyoto Sanga FC	2008	J1 League	8	0	0	0	3	0	11	0
Kyoto Sanga FC	2009	J1 League	0	0	0	0	0	0	0	0
Kyoto Sanga FC	2010	J1 League	5	0	0	0	5	0	10	0
Renofa Yamaguchi FC	2017	J2 League	0	0	0	0	—		0	0
Kataller Toyama	2018	J3 League	0	0	0	0	—		0	0
Career total			213	0	8	0	30	0	251	0
