= Teruaki Kurobe =

Japanese footballer (born 1978)

Teruaki Kurobe 黒部 光昭
Personal information
- Full name: Teruaki Kurobe
- Date of birth: March 6, 1978 (age 48)
- Place of birth: Anan, Tokushima, Japan
- Height: 1.77 m (5 ft 9 1/2 in)
- Position: Forward

Youth career
- 1993–1995: Tokushima Commercial High School
- 1996–1999: Fukuoka University

Senior career*
Years	Team	Apps	(Gls)
2000–2004	Kyoto Purple Sanga	138	(62)
2005	Cerezo Osaka	32	(5)
2006	Urawa Reds	9	(0)
2007	JEF United Chiba	11	(0)
2008–2009	Avispa Fukuoka	55	(4)
2010–2013	Kataller Toyama	100	(22)
2014	TTM Customs		
Total		345	(93)

International career
2003–2004	Japan	4	(0)
Medal record
Kyoto Purple Sanga
Winner	Emperor's Cup	2002
Urawa Reds
Winner	J1 League	2006
Winner	Emperor's Cup	2006
- * Club domestic league appearances and goals

Teruaki Kurobe (黒部 光昭, Kurobe Teruaki; born March 6, 1978) is a former Japanese football player. He played for Japan national team.

== Club career ==
Kurobe was born in Anan on March 6, 1978. After graduating from Fukuoka University, he joined the Kyoto Purple Sanga in 2000. The club was relegated to the J2 League in 2000 and many main players left the club. In 2001, he played as a regular player after a generational change. In 2002, he played center forward, as one of the three top forwards with wings, along with Daisuke Matsui and Park Ji-sung, and the club won the Emperor's Cup, which was their first major title. He moved to Cerezo Osaka in 2005. After that, he played for the Urawa Reds in 2006 and the JEF United Chiba in 2007, but he was not put into play as often. In 2008, he moved to the J2 League club Avispa Fukuoka and he played more often. He moved to Kataller Toyama in 2010 and he played until 2013. In 2014, he moved to Thailand and played for the TTM Customs. He retired at the end of the 2014 season.

== National team career ==
On March 28, 2003, Kurobe debuted for the Japan national team against Uruguay. He played in four games for Japan until 2004.

== Club statistics ==
Club performance			League		Cup		League Cup		Total	
Season	Club	League	Apps	Goals	Apps	Goals	Apps	Goals	Apps	Goals
Japan			League		Emperor's Cup		J.League Cup		Total	
2000	Kyoto Purple Sanga	J1 League	12	0	1	0	5	1	18	1
2001	Kyoto Purple Sanga	J2 League	41	30	0	0	2	0	43	30
2002	Kyoto Purple Sanga	J1 League	27	13	5	4	6	1	38	18
2003	Kyoto Purple Sanga	J1 League	23	10	1	0	1	2	25	12
2004	Kyoto Purple Sanga	J2 League	35	9	1	0	-		36	9
2005	Cerezo Osaka	J1 League	32	5	3	1	8	0	43	6
2006	Urawa Reds	J1 League	9	0	1	0	4	0	14	0
2007	JEF United Chiba	J1 League	11	0	0	0	5	1	16	1
2008	Avispa Fukuoka	J2 League	23	1	1	0	-		24	1
2009	Avispa Fukuoka	J2 League	32	3	2	1	-		34	4
2010	Kataller Toyama	J2 League	27	8	1	0	-		28	8
2011	Kataller Toyama	J2 League	30	9	1	1	-		31	10
2012	Kataller Toyama	J2 League	29	5	0	0	-		29	5
2013	Kataller Toyama	J2 League	14	0	0	0	-		14	0
Total			345	93	17	7	31	5	393	105

== National team statistics ==
Japan national team
Year	Apps	Goals
2003	3	0
2004	1	0
Total	4	0
