= 2014 Kataller Toyama season =

Kataller Toyama
2014 season
- Manager: Takayoshi Amma
- Stadium: Toyama Stadium
- J2 League: 22nd

2014 Kataller Toyama season.

== J2 League ==
| Match | Date | Team | Score | Team | Venue | Attendance |
|---|---|---|---|---|---|---|
| 1 | 2014.03.02 | Fagiano Okayama | 0-0 | Kataller Toyama | Kanko Stadium | 9,577 |
| 2 | 2014.03.09 | FC Gifu | 3-0 | Kataller Toyama | Gifu Nagaragawa Stadium | 7,879 |
| 3 | 2014.03.16 | Kataller Toyama | 1-2 | Yokohama FC | Toyama Stadium | 4,554 |
| 4 | 2014.03.22 | Kataller Toyama | 1-2 | Kyoto Sanga FC | Toyama Stadium | 3,761 |
| 5 | 2014.03.30 | Thespakusatsu Gunma | 2-0 | Kataller Toyama | Shoda Shoyu Stadium Gunma | 1,814 |
| 6 | 2014.04.05 | Kataller Toyama | 0-3 | Tokyo Verdy | Toyama Stadium | 2,873 |
| 7 | 2014.04.13 | Ehime FC | 4-0 | Kataller Toyama | Ningineer Stadium | 2,272 |
| 8 | 2014.04.20 | Kataller Toyama | 1-1 | JEF United Chiba | Toyama Stadium | 5,733 |
| 9 | 2014.04.26 | Oita Trinita | 3-0 | Kataller Toyama | Oita Bank Dome | 5,971 |
| 10 | 2014.04.29 | Kataller Toyama | 3-2 | Matsumoto Yamaga FC | Toyama Stadium | 6,781 |
| 11 | 2014.05.03 | Montedio Yamagata | 1-0 | Kataller Toyama | ND Soft Stadium Yamagata | 6,430 |
| 12 | 2014.05.06 | Kataller Toyama | 0-2 | Giravanz Kitakyushu | Toyama Stadium | 4,021 |
| 13 | 2014.05.11 | Avispa Fukuoka | 2-1 | Kataller Toyama | Level5 Stadium | 5,708 |
| 14 | 2014.05.18 | Kataller Toyama | 0-1 | Júbilo Iwata | Toyama Stadium | 8,018 |
| 15 | 2014.05.24 | Kamatamare Sanuki | 2-1 | Kataller Toyama | Kagawa Marugame Stadium | 2,772 |
| 16 | 2014.05.31 | Roasso Kumamoto | 2-0 | Kataller Toyama | Kumamoto Suizenji Stadium | 3,580 |
| 17 | 2014.06.07 | Kataller Toyama | 0-1 | Shonan Bellmare | Toyama Stadium | 4,596 |
| 18 | 2014.06.14 | Kataller Toyama | 0-3 | Mito HollyHock | Toyama Stadium | 3,240 |
| 19 | 2014.06.21 | Consadole Sapporo | 2-1 | Kataller Toyama | Sapporo Atsubetsu Stadium | 6,844 |
| 20 | 2014.06.28 | Kataller Toyama | 1-0 | V-Varen Nagasaki | Toyama Stadium | 2,622 |
| 21 | 2014.07.05 | Tochigi SC | 2-1 | Kataller Toyama | Tochigi Green Stadium | 4,227 |
| 22 | 2014.07.20 | Kataller Toyama | 1-1 | Kamatamare Sanuki | Toyama Stadium | 4,602 |
| 23 | 2014.07.26 | Shonan Bellmare | 2-0 | Kataller Toyama | Shonan BMW Stadium Hiratsuka | 7,312 |
| 24 | 2014.07.30 | Kataller Toyama | 1-3 | Ehime FC | Toyama Stadium | 3,756 |
| 25 | 2014.08.03 | Yokohama FC | 2-0 | Kataller Toyama | NHK Spring Mitsuzawa Football Stadium | 3,922 |
| 26 | 2014.08.10 | Kataller Toyama | 1-1 | Montedio Yamagata | Toyama Stadium | 2,983 |
| 27 | 2014.08.17 | Júbilo Iwata | 3-2 | Kataller Toyama | Yamaha Stadium | 8,388 |
| 28 | 2014.08.24 | Kataller Toyama | 0-2 | Roasso Kumamoto | Toyama Stadium | 3,371 |
| 29 | 2014.08.31 | V-Varen Nagasaki | 2-0 | Kataller Toyama | Nagasaki Stadium | 3,502 |
| 30 | 2014.09.06 | Kataller Toyama | 0-0 | FC Gifu | Toyama Stadium | 4,571 |
| 31 | 2014.09.14 | Kataller Toyama | 1-1 | Oita Trinita | Toyama Stadium | 3,624 |
| 32 | 2014.09.20 | Tokyo Verdy | 0-1 | Kataller Toyama | Ajinomoto Stadium | 3,445 |
| 33 | 2014.09.23 | Kataller Toyama | 0-1 | Thespakusatsu Gunma | Toyama Stadium | 4,698 |
| 34 | 2014.09.28 | Kataller Toyama | 1-2 | Avispa Fukuoka | Toyama Stadium | 4,005 |
| 35 | 2014.10.04 | Giravanz Kitakyushu | 2-2 | Kataller Toyama | Honjo Stadium | 2,734 |
| 36 | 2014.10.11 | Mito HollyHock | 2-3 | Kataller Toyama | K's denki Stadium Mito | 3,818 |
| 37 | 2014.10.19 | Kataller Toyama | 0-2 | Consadole Sapporo | Toyama Stadium | 4,108 |
| 38 | 2014.10.26 | Matsumoto Yamaga FC | 2-1 | Kataller Toyama | Matsumotodaira Park Stadium | 14,007 |
| 39 | 2014.11.01 | Kataller Toyama | 1-0 | Tochigi SC | Toyama Stadium | 2,837 |
| 40 | 2014.11.09 | Kyoto Sanga FC | 1-1 | Kataller Toyama | Kyoto Nishikyogoku Athletic Stadium | 3,680 |
| 41 | 2014.11.15 | JEF United Chiba | 2-1 | Kataller Toyama | Fukuda Denshi Arena | 10,199 |
| 42 | 2014.11.23 | Kataller Toyama | 0-3 | Fagiano Okayama | Toyama Stadium | 4,842 |
