= Yoshikawa (surname) =

Yoshikawa (written: 吉川, 吉河, 芳川 or よしかわ in hiragana) is a Japanese surname. Notable people with the surname include:

- Yoshikawa Akimasa (芳川 顕正; 1842–1920), Japanese bureaucrat, statesman and politician
- Aimi Yoshikawa (吉川 あいみ; born 1994), Japanese gravure idol, actress and AV idol
- Ayako Yoshikawa (吉川 綾子; 1933–2025), Japanese sprinter and long jumper
- Christine Yoshikawa (born 1974), Canadian-American classical pianist
- Chuei Yoshikawa (吉川 忠英; born 1947), Japanese guitarist
- Daiki Yoshikawa (吉川 大幾; born 1992), Japanese baseball player
- Eiji Yoshikawa (吉川 英治; 1892–1962), Japanese writer
- Hajime Yoshikawa (吉川 元; born 1967), Japanese politician
- Haruko Yoshikawa (吉川 春子; born 1940), Japanese politician
- Hinano Yoshikawa (吉川 ひなの; born 1979), Japanese actress, fashion model and singer
- Hirokazu Yoshikawa (吉川博和), American psychologist
- Hiroshi Yoshikawa (吉川 洋; born 1951), Japanese economist
- Juichi Yoshikawa (吉川 壽一; born 1943), Japanese calligrapher
- Kenta Yoshikawa (吉川 健太; born 1986), Japanese footballer
- Kōjirō Yoshikawa (吉川 幸次郎; 1904–1980), Japanese sinologist
- Mako Yoshikawa (born 1966), American writer
- Mariko Yoshikawa (吉川 真理子; born 1951), Japanese fencer
- Miho Yoshikawa (吉川 美穂; born 1993), Japanese cyclist
- Mika Yoshikawa (吉川 美香; born 1984), Japanese middle- and long-distance runner
- Miki Yoshikawa (吉河 美希; born 1982), Japanese manga artist
- Mineo Yoshikawa (吉川 峰夫; born 1947), Japanese basketball player
- Mitsuko Yoshikawa (吉川 満子; 1901–1991), Japanese actress
- Mitsuo Yoshikawa (吉川 光夫; born 1988), Japanese baseball player
- Muneo Yoshikawa (吉川 宗男; born 1938), Japanese academic and writer
- Nayoko Yoshikawa (吉川 なよ子; born 1949), Japanese golfer
- Priyanka Yoshikawa (吉川 プリアンカ; born 1994), Japanese beauty pageant winner
- Saori Yoshikawa (吉川 沙織; born 1976), Japanese politician
- Shogo Yoshikawa (吉川 翔梧; born 1995), Japanese footballer
- Sōji Yoshikawa (吉川 惣司; born 1947), Japanese animator
- Susumu Yoshikawa (よしかわ 進; born 1950), Japanese manga artist
- Takamori Yoshikawa (吉川 貴盛; born 1950), Japanese politician
- Takeo Yoshikawa (吉川 猛夫; 1914–1993), Japanese World War II spy
- Takuya Yoshikawa (吉川 拓也; born 1988), Japanese footballer
- Teruaki Yoshikawa (吉川 輝昭; born 1981), Japanese baseball player
- Tomoki Yoshikawa (吉川 智貴; born 1989), Japanese futsal player
- Tomiko Yoshikawa (吉川とみ子; born 1954), Japanese racing driver
- Toru Yoshikawa (吉川 亨; born 1961), Japanese footballer
- Yoshikawa Tomizo (吉川 富三; 1900–1995), Japanese photographer
- Wataru Yoshikawa (吉川 和多留; born 1968), Japanese motorcycle racer
- Yoichiro Yoshikawa (吉川 洋一郎; 1957–2026), Japanese composer, music arranger and film producer
- Yoshihisa Yoshikawa (吉川 貴久; 1936–2019), Japanese sport shooter

== Fictional characters ==
- Chinatsu Yoshikawa (吉川 ちなつ), a character in the manga series YuruYuri
- Yūko Yoshikawa (吉川 優子), a character in the novel series Sound! Euphonium
- Nao Yoshikawa (吉川 優子), a character in the novel series Sound! Euphonium
