= 2017 Kataller Toyama season =

Kataller Toyama
2017 season
- Manager: Tetsuro Uki
- Stadium: Toyama Stadium
- J3 League: 8th

2017 Kataller Toyama season.

== J3 League ==
=== League table ===
| Pos | Team | Pld | W | D | L | GF | GA | GD | Pts |
|---|---|---|---|---|---|---|---|---|---|
| 5 | Nagano Parceiro | 32 | 13 | 11 | 8 | 34 | 25 | +9 | 50 |
| 6 | FC Ryukyu | 32 | 13 | 11 | 8 | 44 | 36 | +8 | 50 |
| 7 | Fujieda MYFC | 32 | 12 | 11 | 9 | 50 | 43 | +7 | 47 |
| 8 | Kataller Toyama | 32 | 13 | 8 | 11 | 37 | 33 | +4 | 47 |
| 9 | Giravanz Kitakyushu | 32 | 13 | 7 | 12 | 44 | 37 | +7 | 46 |
| 10 | Fukushima United | 32 | 13 | 4 | 15 | 39 | 43 | −4 | 43 |
| 11 | FC Tokyo U-23 | 32 | 12 | 7 | 13 | 36 | 47 | −11 | 43 |

Source: 2017 MEIJI YASUDA J3 LEAGUE League table
Rules for classification: 1) Points; 2) Goal difference; 3) Goals scored; 4th) head-to-head results; 5th) disciplinary points; 6th) draw

=== Match details ===
J3 League match details
| Match | Date | Team | Score | Team | Venue | Attendance |
|---|---|---|---|---|---|---|
| 1 | 2017.03.12 | FC Tokyo U-23 | 0-2 | Kataller Toyama | Yumenoshima Stadium | 2,475 |
| 2 | 2017.03.18 | Kataller Toyama | 1-0 | Kagoshima United FC | Toyama Stadium | 3,698 |
| 3 | 2017.03.26 | Grulla Morioka | 0-3 | Kataller Toyama | Iwagin Stadium | 1,018 |
| 4 | 2017.04.02 | Kataller Toyama | 0-3 | Azul Claro Numazu | Toyama Stadium | 3,008 |
| 5 | 2017.04.16 | Kataller Toyama | 0-0 | FC Ryukyu | Toyama Stadium | 3,041 |
| 6 | 2017.04.29 | Fujieda MYFC | 1-1 | Kataller Toyama | Fujieda Soccer Stadium | 1,763 |
| 7 | 2017.05.07 | Kataller Toyama | 2-0 | Fukushima United FC | Toyama Stadium | 3,933 |
| 8 | 2017.05.13 | Cerezo Osaka U-23 | 1-1 | Kataller Toyama | Kincho Stadium | 748 |
| 9 | 2017.05.20 | Kataller Toyama | 1-0 | YSCC Yokohama | Toyama Stadium | 2,387 |
| 10 | 2017.05.28 | AC Nagano Parceiro | 1-0 | Kataller Toyama | Minami Nagano Sports Park Stadium | 4,987 |
| 11 | 2017.06.03 | Kataller Toyama | 2-0 | SC Sagamihara | Toyama Stadium | 3,138 |
| 12 | 2017.06.11 | Blaublitz Akita | 1-1 | Kataller Toyama | Akigin Stadium | 2,488 |
| 13 | 2017.06.18 | Gainare Tottori | 0-1 | Kataller Toyama | Tottori Bank Bird Stadium | 2,054 |
| 14 | 2017.06.25 | Kataller Toyama | 2-0 | Gamba Osaka U-23 | Toyama Stadium | 2,585 |
| 15 | 2017.07.01 | Kataller Toyama | 2-1 | Giravanz Kitakyushu | Toyama Stadium | 2,831 |
| 16 | 2017.07.08 | Tochigi SC | 1-1 | Kataller Toyama | Tochigi Green Stadium | 6,320 |
| 18 | 2017.07.22 | Gamba Osaka U-23 | 0-2 | Kataller Toyama | Suita City Football Stadium | 1,750 |
| 19 | 2017.08.19 | Kataller Toyama | 1-2 | FC Tokyo U-23 | Toyama Stadium | 6,383 |
| 20 | 2017.08.26 | Kagoshima United FC | 2-1 | Kataller Toyama | Kagoshima Kamoike Stadium | 2,413 |
| 21 | 2017.09.02 | YSCC Yokohama | 1-1 | Kataller Toyama | NHK Spring Mitsuzawa Football Stadium | 1,043 |
| 22 | 2017.09.09 | Kataller Toyama | 0-0 | Cerezo Osaka U-23 | Toyama Stadium | 3,425 |
| 23 | 2017.09.17 | Azul Claro Numazu | 2-0 | Kataller Toyama | Ashitaka Park Stadium | 1,574 |
| 24 | 2017.09.23 | Giravanz Kitakyushu | 0-2 | Kataller Toyama | Mikuni World Stadium Kitakyushu | 4,843 |
| 25 | 2017.10.01 | Kataller Toyama | 1-2 | Tochigi SC | Toyama Stadium | 4,014 |
| 26 | 2017.10.08 | Fukushima United FC | 0-1 | Kataller Toyama | Shonan BMW Stadium Hiratsuka | 1,284 |
| 27 | 2017.10.15 | Kataller Toyama | 4-2 | Fujieda MYFC | Toyama Stadium | 2,318 |
| 28 | 2017.10.22 | Kataller Toyama | 0-2 | Grulla Morioka | Toyama Stadium | 1,917 |
| 29 | 2017.10.29 | SC Sagamihara | 3-2 | Kataller Toyama | Sagamihara Gion Stadium | 3,090 |
| 30 | 2017.11.05 | Kataller Toyama | 0-4 | Blaublitz Akita | Toyama Stadium | 3,053 |
| 32 | 2017.11.19 | Kataller Toyama | 1-2 | AC Nagano Parceiro | Toyama Stadium | 1,929 |
| 33 | 2017.11.26 | Kataller Toyama | 1-1 | Gainare Tottori | Toyama Stadium | 2,876 |
| 34 | 2017.12.03 | FC Ryukyu | 1-0 | Kataller Toyama | Okinawa Athletic Park Stadium | 3,128 |
