= Nagatomi =

Nagatomi (written: 永冨) is a Japanese surname. Notable people with the surname include:

- Aki Nagatomi (永富 有紀, born 1969), Japanese volleyball player
- Masatoshi Nagatomi (1926–2000), Japanese professor of Buddhist studies
- Keiko Nagatomi (born 1974), Japanese tennis player
- Yuya Nagatomi (永冨 裕也, born 1982), Japanese footballer
