= 2015 Kataller Toyama season =

Kataller Toyama
2015 season
- Manager: Yasuyuki Kishino; Shigeo Sawairi
- Stadium: Toyama Stadium
- J3 League: 5th

2015 Kataller Toyama season.

== J3 League ==
=== League table ===
| Pos | Team | Pld | W | D | L | GF | GA | GD | Pts | Promotion or relegation |
|---|---|---|---|---|---|---|---|---|---|---|
| 2 | Machida Zelvia (P) | 36 | 23 | 9 | 4 | 52 | 18 | +34 | 78 | Qualification to J2 League promotion playoffs (Note: Only teams that hold a J2 license are eligible for promotion.) |
| 3 | Nagano Parceiro | 36 | 21 | 7 | 8 | 46 | 28 | +18 | 70 | |
| 4 | SC Sagamihara | 36 | 17 | 7 | 12 | 59 | 51 | +8 | 58 | |
| 5 | Kataller Toyama | 36 | 14 | 10 | 12 | 37 | 36 | +1 | 52 | |
| 6 | Gainare Tottori | 36 | 14 | 8 | 14 | 47 | 41 | +6 | 50 | |
| 7 | Fukushima United | 36 | 13 | 10 | 13 | 42 | 48 | −6 | 49 | |
| 8 | Blaublitz Akita | 36 | 12 | 9 | 15 | 37 | 40 | −3 | 45 | |

Updated to match(es) played on 23 November 2015. Source: JLeague.jp
Rules for classification: 1) Points; 2) Goal difference; 3) Goals scored; 4th) head-to-head results; 5th) disciplinary points; 6th) draw
(P) Promoted

=== Match details ===
J3 League match details
| Match | Date | Team | Score | Team | Venue | Attendance |
|---|---|---|---|---|---|---|
| 1 | 2015.03.15 | Kataller Toyama | 1-0 | Blaublitz Akita | Toyama Stadium | 4,542 |
| 2 | 2015.03.22 | Gainare Tottori | 2-1 | Kataller Toyama | Tottori Bank Bird Stadium | 2,684 |
| 3 | 2015.03.29 | Grulla Morioka | 0-0 | Kataller Toyama | Morioka Minami Park Stadium | 1,938 |
| 4 | 2015.04.05 | Kataller Toyama | 1-2 | FC Machida Zelvia | Toyama Stadium | 2,552 |
| 6 | 2015.04.19 | Renofa Yamaguchi FC | 1-0 | Kataller Toyama | Ishin Memorial Park Stadium | 2,319 |
| 7 | 2015.04.26 | Kataller Toyama | 1-0 | Fujieda MYFC | Toyama Stadium | 2,812 |
| 8 | 2015.04.29 | Kataller Toyama | 0-1 | SC Sagamihara | Toyama Stadium | 3,817 |
| 9 | 2015.05.03 | AC Nagano Parceiro | 0-1 | Kataller Toyama | Minami Nagano Sports Park Stadium | 6,372 |
| 10 | 2015.05.06 | Kataller Toyama | 2-0 | YSCC Yokohama | Toyama Stadium | 3,146 |
| 11 | 2015.05.10 | Kataller Toyama | 2-1 | J.League U-22 Selection | Kataller Toyama | 3,102 |
| 12 | 2015.05.17 | FC Ryukyu | 0-0 | Kataller Toyama | Okinawa Athletic Park Stadium | 869 |
| 13 | 2015.05.24 | Kataller Toyama | 1-2 | Fukushima United FC | Toyama Stadium | 3,344 |
| 14 | 2015.05.31 | AC Nagano Parceiro | 1-0 | Kataller Toyama | Minami Nagano Sports Park Stadium | 4,508 |
| 15 | 2015.06.07 | Kataller Toyama | 1-1 | YSCC Yokohama | Toyama Stadium | 2,876 |
| 17 | 2015.06.21 | Kataller Toyama | 0-0 | J.League U-22 Selection | Kataller Toyama | 2,375 |
| 18 | 2015.06.28 | Kataller Toyama | 2-5 | Renofa Yamaguchi FC | Toyama Stadium | 1,958 |
| 19 | 2015.07.05 | Fujieda MYFC | 1-4 | Kataller Toyama | Shizuoka Stadium | 1,055 |
| 20 | 2015.07.12 | Blaublitz Akita | 1-1 | Kataller Toyama | Akigin Stadium | 2,020 |
| 21 | 2015.07.19 | Kataller Toyama | 0-0 | SC Sagamihara | Uozu Momoyama Sports Park Stadium | 2,163 |
| 22 | 2015.07.26 | Fukushima United FC | 0-3 | Kataller Toyama | Toho Stadium | 1,130 |
| 23 | 2015.07.29 | Kataller Toyama | 0-1 | FC Ryukyu | Toyama Stadium | 2,955 |
| 24 | 2015.08.02 | FC Machida Zelvia | 1-0 | Kataller Toyama | Machida Stadium | 3,012 |
| 25 | 2015.08.09 | Kataller Toyama | 1-0 | Grulla Morioka | Toyama Stadium | 2,542 |
| 26 | 2015.08.16 | Gainare Tottori | 1-2 | Kataller Toyama | Chubu Yajin Stadium | 1,715 |
| 27 | 2015.09.06 | Kataller Toyama | 0-0 | AC Nagano Parceiro | Toyama Stadium | 2,973 |
| 28 | 2015.09.13 | Renofa Yamaguchi FC | 1-2 | Kataller Toyama | Ishin Memorial Park Stadium | 4,630 |
| 29 | 2015.09.20 | Kataller Toyama | 1-1 | Fukushima United FC | Uozu Momoyama Sports Park Stadium | 1,870 |
| 30 | 2015.09.23 | Kataller Toyama | 1-0 | Fujieda MYFC | Uozu Momoyama Sports Park Stadium | 2,193 |
| 31 | 2015.09.27 | SC Sagamihara | 5-1 | Kataller Toyama | Sagamihara Gion Stadium | 2,532 |
| 32 | 2015.10.04 | Kataller Toyama | 0-2 | Blaublitz Akita | Toyama Stadium | 3,127 |
| 33 | 2015.10.11 | FC Machida Zelvia | 2-0 | Kataller Toyama | Machida Stadium | 3,163 |
| 34 | 2015.10.18 | Kataller Toyama | 2-1 | J.League U-22 Selection | Kataller Toyama | 2,270 |
| 35 | 2015.10.25 | Kataller Toyama | 1-1 | Gainare Tottori | Toyama Stadium | 2,995 |
| 36 | 2015.11.01 | YSCC Yokohama | 0-2 | Kataller Toyama | Yokohama Mitsuzawa Athletic Stadium | 1,051 |
| 38 | 2015.11.15 | Kataller Toyama | 2-1 | Grulla Morioka | Toyama Stadium | 2,780 |
| 39 | 2015.11.23 | FC Ryukyu | 1-1 | Kataller Toyama | Okinawa Athletic Park Stadium | 2,368 |
