= 2011 Kataller Toyama season =

Kataller Toyama
2011 season
- Manager: Takayoshi Amma
- Stadium: Toyama Stadium
- J2 League: 16 th

2011 Kataller Toyama season.

== J2 League ==
Match	Date	Team	Score	Team	Venue	Attendance
1	2011.03.06	Yokohama FC	1–2	Kataller Toyama	NHK Spring Mitsuzawa Football Stadium	11,306
8	2011.04.23	Kataller Toyama	1–3	Tochigi SC	Toyama Stadium	2,849
9	2011.04.30	Gainare Tottori	0–0	Kataller Toyama	Tottori Bank Bird Stadium	3,268
10	2011.05.04	Kataller Toyama	1–0	FC Gifu	Toyama Stadium	4,142
11	2011.05.08	FC Tokyo	1–0	Kataller Toyama	Ajinomoto Stadium	14,174
12	2011.05.15	Kyoto Sanga FC	0–0	Kataller Toyama	Kyoto Nishikyogoku Athletic Stadium	5,464
13	2011.05.22	Kataller Toyama	2–3	Thespa Kusatsu	Toyama Stadium	2,985
14	2011.05.29	Giravanz Kitakyushu	2–1	Kataller Toyama	Honjo Stadium	1,336
15	2011.06.04	Kataller Toyama	1–1	Roasso Kumamoto	Toyama Stadium	2,390
16	2011.06.12	Mito HollyHock	3–0	Kataller Toyama	K's denki Stadium Mito	2,582
17	2011.06.19	Kataller Toyama	1–5	Tokyo Verdy	Toyama Stadium	2,695
18	2011.06.26	Consadole Sapporo	0–0	Kataller Toyama	Sapporo Dome	10,357
2	2011.06.29	Kataller Toyama	0–2	Tokushima Vortis	Toyama Stadium	1,716
19	2011.07.03	Kataller Toyama	1–2	JEF United Chiba	Toyama Stadium	3,529
20	2011.07.10	Sagan Tosu	0–1	Kataller Toyama	Best Amenity Stadium	4,357
21	2011.07.17	Roasso Kumamoto	1–1	Kataller Toyama	Kumamoto Athletics Stadium	25,005
22	2011.07.23	Kataller Toyama	2–0	Mito HollyHock	Toyama Stadium	3,310
23	2011.07.30	Tokushima Vortis	3–1	Kataller Toyama	Pocarisweat Stadium	5,189
3	2011.08.06	Ehime FC	1–0	Kataller Toyama	Ningineer Stadium	2,679
24	2011.08.14	Kataller Toyama	1–2	Consadole Sapporo	Toyama Stadium	3,939
25	2011.08.21	JEF United Chiba	0–0	Kataller Toyama	Fukuda Denshi Arena	8,445
26	2011.08.28	Kataller Toyama	1–0	FC Tokyo	Toyama Stadium	8,663
4	2011.09.03	Kataller Toyama	1–0	Oita Trinita	Toyama Stadium	2,087
27	2011.09.11	Kataller Toyama	2–3	Shonan Bellmare	Toyama Stadium	3,103
28	2011.09.18	Tochigi SC	1–2	Kataller Toyama	Tochigi Green Stadium	5,425
29	2011.09.25	Kataller Toyama	1–1	Kyoto Sanga FC	Toyama Stadium	3,586
5	2011.09.28	Shonan Bellmare	2–0	Kataller Toyama	Hiratsuka Stadium	4,571
30	2011.10.01	Oita Trinita	1–2	Kataller Toyama	Oita Bank Dome	6,013
31	2011.10.16	Kataller Toyama	1–2	Giravanz Kitakyushu	Toyama Stadium	3,296
6	2011.10.19	Kataller Toyama	0–3	Sagan Tosu	Toyama Stadium	2,014
32	2011.10.22	Tokyo Verdy	1–2	Kataller Toyama	Ajinomoto Stadium	3,455
7	2011.10.26	Fagiano Okayama	1–1	Kataller Toyama	Kanko Stadium	4,323
33	2011.10.30	Kataller Toyama	4–2	Gainare Tottori	Toyama Stadium	2,460
34	2011.11.06	Thespa Kusatsu	0–0	Kataller Toyama	Shoda Shoyu Stadium Gunma	2,200
35	2011.11.13	Kataller Toyama	0–2	Fagiano Okayama	Toyama Stadium	2,889
36	2011.11.19	Kataller Toyama	2–1	Ehime FC	Toyama Stadium	2,087
37	2011.11.27	FC Gifu	1–1	Kataller Toyama	Gifu Nagaragawa Stadium	5,518
38	2011.12.03	Kataller Toyama	0–2	Yokohama FC	Toyama Stadium	4,493
