= Kohei Nishino =

Japanese footballer

Personal information
- Date of birth: April 15, 1982 (age 44)
- Place of birth: Hyōgo, Japan
- Height: 1.80 m (5 ft 11 in)
- Position: Forward

Youth career
- 2001–2004: Nippon Bunri University

Senior career*
Years	Team	Apps	(Gls)
2005	Oita Trinita	8	(1)
2006–2008	Mito HollyHock	100	(23)
2009–2010	Fagiano Okayama	46	(11)
Total		154	(35)
- * Club domestic league appearances and goals

Kohei Nishino (西野 晃平, Nishino Kōhei; born April 15, 1982) is a former Japanese football player. His brother is Makoto Nishino.

He played for Japanese club Oita Trinita, Mito HollyHock and Fagiano Okayama.

== Career statistics ==
Appearances and goals by club, season and competition
Club	Season	League			Emperor's Cup		J.League Cup		Total	
Club	Season	Division	Apps	Goals	Apps	Goals	Apps	Goals	!Apps	Goals
Oita Trinita	2005	J1 League	8	1	0	0	2	0	10	1
Mito HollyHock	2006	J2 League	35	8	1	0	—		36	8
Mito HollyHock	2007	J2 League	38	7	2	0	—		40	7
Mito HollyHock	2008	J2 League	27	8	2	0	—		29	8
Fagiano Okayama	2009	J2 League	34	9	0	0	—		34	9
Fagiano Okayama	2010	J2 League	12	2	1	0	—		13	2
Career total			154	35	6	0	2	0	162	35
