= 2013 Kataller Toyama season =

Kataller Toyama
2013 season
- Manager: Takayoshi Amma
- Stadium: Toyama Stadium
- J2 League: 18th

2013 Kataller Toyama season.

== J2 League ==
Match	Date	Team	Score	Team	Venue	Attendance
1	2013.03.03	Giravanz Kitakyushu	1-2	Kataller Toyama	Honjo Stadium	2,506
2	2013.03.10	Mito HollyHock	1-0	Kataller Toyama	K's denki Stadium Mito	2,895
3	2013.03.17	Kataller Toyama	1-0	Ehime FC	Toyama Stadium	5,069
4	2013.03.20	V-Varen Nagasaki	1-0	Kataller Toyama	Nagasaki Stadium	2,093
5	2013.03.24	Kataller Toyama	1-0	Kyoto Sanga FC	Toyama Stadium	4,353
6	2013.03.31	Roasso Kumamoto	1-1	Kataller Toyama	Umakana-Yokana Stadium	5,012
7	2013.04.07	Kataller Toyama	1-2	Tochigi SC	Toyama Stadium	2,315
8	2013.04.14	Kataller Toyama	0-0	Vissel Kobe	Toyama Stadium	3,624
9	2013.04.17	FC Gifu	2-3	Kataller Toyama	Gifu Nagaragawa Stadium	2,341
10	2013.04.21	Kataller Toyama	0-4	Gamba Osaka	Toyama Stadium	13,639
11	2013.04.28	Kataller Toyama	1-1	Tokyo Verdy	Toyama Stadium	4,883
12	2013.05.03	Montedio Yamagata	3-1	Kataller Toyama	ND Soft Stadium Yamagata	7,292
13	2013.05.06	Kataller Toyama	1-1	Gainare Tottori	Toyama Stadium	2,820
14	2013.05.12	JEF United Chiba	3-2	Kataller Toyama	Fukuda Denshi Arena	9,399
15	2013.05.19	Kataller Toyama	1-2	Avispa Fukuoka	Toyama Stadium	3,107
16	2013.05.26	Matsumoto Yamaga FC	3-0	Kataller Toyama	Matsumotodaira Park Stadium	9,974
17	2013.06.01	Kataller Toyama	2-1	Tokushima Vortis	Toyama Stadium	3,230
18	2013.06.08	Kataller Toyama	0-0	Thespakusatsu Gunma	Toyama Stadium	3,879
19	2013.06.15	Consadole Sapporo	1-0	Kataller Toyama	Sapporo Atsubetsu Stadium	4,837
20	2013.06.22	Yokohama FC	2-1	Kataller Toyama	NHK Spring Mitsuzawa Football Stadium	4,561
21	2013.06.29	Kataller Toyama	0-0	Fagiano Okayama	Toyama Stadium	3,632
22	2013.07.03	Kataller Toyama	1-2	JEF United Chiba	Toyama Stadium	2,905
23	2013.07.07	Tochigi SC	1-1	Kataller Toyama	Tochigi Green Stadium	4,503
24	2013.07.14	Vissel Kobe	1-0	Kataller Toyama	Noevir Stadium Kobe	10,578
25	2013.07.20	Kataller Toyama	1-1	V-Varen Nagasaki	Toyama Stadium	4,141
26	2013.07.27	Thespakusatsu Gunma	1-1	Kataller Toyama	Shoda Shoyu Stadium Gunma	1,815
27	2013.08.04	Kataller Toyama	3-1	Consadole Sapporo	Toyama Stadium	4,071
28	2013.08.11	Gainare Tottori	2-3	Kataller Toyama	Tottori Bank Bird Stadium	3,537
29	2013.08.18	Tokushima Vortis	2-0	Kataller Toyama	Pocarisweat Stadium	4,562
30	2013.08.21	Kataller Toyama	0-1	Matsumoto Yamaga FC	Toyama Stadium	4,262
31	2013.08.25	Kataller Toyama	1-3	Montedio Yamagata	Toyama Stadium	4,472
32	2013.09.01	Ehime FC	0-0	Kataller Toyama	Ningineer Stadium	1,809
33	2013.09.15	Kataller Toyama	0-0	Giravanz Kitakyushu	Toyama Stadium	3,456
34	2013.09.22	Kyoto Sanga FC	3-2	Kataller Toyama	Kagoshima Kamoike Stadium	5,594
35	2013.09.29	Avispa Fukuoka	1-4	Kataller Toyama	Level5 Stadium	3,968
36	2013.10.06	Kataller Toyama	1-2	Roasso Kumamoto	Toyama Stadium	4,942
37	2013.10.20	Gamba Osaka	3-1	Kataller Toyama	Expo '70 Commemorative Stadium	9,286
38	2013.10.27	Kataller Toyama	2-1	Mito HollyHock	Toyama Stadium	4,056
39	2013.11.03	Tokyo Verdy	1-2	Kataller Toyama	Ajinomoto Stadium	3,988
40	2013.11.10	Kataller Toyama	0-1	Yokohama FC	Toyama Stadium	3,299
41	2013.11.17	Fagiano Okayama	1-3	Kataller Toyama	Kanko Stadium	8,754
42	2013.11.24	Kataller Toyama	1-2	FC Gifu	Toyama Stadium	7,805
