= 2018 Kataller Toyama season =

Kataller Toyama
2018 season
- Manager: Tetsuro Uki; Ryo Adachi
- Stadium: Toyama Stadium
- J3 League: 11th

2018 Kataller Toyama season.

== J3 League ==
Match	Date	Team	Score	Team	Venue	Attendance
1	2018.03.11	FC Ryukyu	4-3	Kataller Toyama	Okinawa Athletic Park Stadium	4,815
2	2018.03.17	Kataller Toyama	2-1	Fujieda MYFC	Toyama Stadium	2,435
3	2018.03.21	Kataller Toyama	1-2	Cerezo Osaka U-23	Toyama Stadium	1,602
4	2018.03.25	FC Tokyo U-23	3-0	Toyama Stadium	Ajinomoto Field Nishigaoka	1,679
5	2018.04.01	Azul Claro Numazu	2-0	Kataller Toyama	Ashitaka Park Stadium	1,806
6	2018.04.08	Kataller Toyama	3-0	Gamba Osaka U-23	Toyama Stadium	1,704
7	2018.04.15	SC Sagamihara	1-0	Kataller Toyama	Sagamihara Gion Stadium	3,573
8	2018.04.29	Kataller Toyama	1-4	Blaublitz Akita	Toyama Stadium	3,043
9	2018.05.03	Fukushima United FC	1-0	Kataller Toyama	Toho Stadium	1,351
10	2018.05.06	Kataller Toyama	0-2	Kagoshima United FC	Toyama Stadium	2,334
11	2018.05.19	Gainare Tottori	2-3	Kataller Toyama	Tottori Bank Bird Stadium	2,247
12	2018.06.03	Kataller Toyama	3-0	Giravanz Kitakyushu	Toyama Stadium	2,544
13	2018.06.09	Kataller Toyama	2-2	YSCC Yokohama	Toyama Stadium	2,694
15	2018.06.23	Kataller Toyama	1-3	Grulla Morioka	Toyama Stadium	2,227
16	2018.07.01	Thespakusatsu Gunma	0-1	Kataller Toyama	Shoda Shoyu Stadium Gunma	2,525
17	2018.07.08	AC Nagano Parceiro	5-0	Kataller Toyama	Nagano U Stadium	3,130
18	2018.07.16	Kataller Toyama	1-0	Gainare Tottori	Toyama Stadium	2,133
19	2018.07.21	Fujieda MYFC	0-0	Kataller Toyama	Fujieda Soccer Stadium	1,263
20	2018.08.25	Kataller Toyama	3-1	Fukushima United FC	Toyama Stadium	3,756
21	2018.09.01	Kataller Toyama	0-1	FC Tokyo U-23	Toyama Stadium	2,772
22	2018.09.08	Giravanz Kitakyushu	2-1	Kataller Toyama	Mikuni World Stadium Kitakyushu	3,143
23	2018.09.16	Kataller Toyama	0-1	Thespakusatsu Gunma	Toyama Stadium	3,162
25	2018.09.29	YSCC Yokohama	1-2	Kataller Toyama	Shonan BMW Stadium Hiratsuka	546
26	2018.10.07	Kataller Toyama	3-2	SC Sagamihara	Toyama Stadium	2,232
27	2018.10.14	Grulla Morioka	2-1	Kataller Toyama	Iwagin Stadium	1,308
28	2018.10.21	Kataller Toyama	1-1	AC Nagano Parceiro	Toyama Stadium	3,016
29	2018.10.28	Kagoshima United FC	1-2	Kataller Toyama	Shiranami Stadium	5,078
30	2018.11.04	Gamba Osaka U-23	1-1	Kataller Toyama	Panasonic Stadium Suita	1,105
31	2018.11.11	Kataller Toyama	1-2	Azul Claro Numazu	Toyama Stadium	2,940
32	2018.11.18	Blaublitz Akita	2-2	Kataller Toyama	Akigin Stadium	2,548
33	2018.11.25	Cerezo Osaka U-23	0-1	Kataller Toyama	Yanmar Stadium Nagai	989
34	2018.12.02	Kataller Toyama	2-1	FC Ryukyu	Toyama Stadium	4,124
