= Sho Asuke =

Japanese footballer

Personal information
- Full name: Sho Asuke
- Date of birth: October 28, 1985 (age 41)
- Place of birth: Tokyo, Japan
- Height: 1.78 m (5 ft 10 in)
- Position: Defender

Youth career
- 2004–2007: Kokushikan University

Senior career*
Years	Team	Apps	(Gls)
2008	Tokyo Verdy	0	(0)
2009–2013	Kataller Toyama	100	(3)
Total		100	(3)
- * Club domestic league appearances and goals

Sho Asuke (足助 翔, Asuke Shō; born October 28, 1985) is a former Japanese football player.

== Club statistics ==
Club performance			League		Cup		League Cup		Total	
Season	Club	League	Apps	Goals	Apps	Goals	Apps	Goals	Apps	Goals
Japan			League		Emperor's Cup		J.League Cup		Total	
2004	Kokushikan University	Football League	7	0	-		-		7	0
2008	Tokyo Verdy	J1 League	0	0	0	0	0	0	0	0
2009	Kataller Toyama	J2 League	13	0	0	0	-		13	0
2010	Kataller Toyama	J2 League	17	0	1	0	-		18	0
2011	Kataller Toyama	J2 League								
Country	Japan		37	0	1	0	0	0	38	0
Total			37	0	1	0	0	0	38	0
