= Daisuke Asahi =

Japanese footballer

Daisuke Asahi 朝日 大輔
Personal information
- Full name: Daisuke Asahi
- Date of birth: July 26, 1980 (age 46)
- Place of birth: Hiroshima, Japan
- Height: 1.73 m (5 ft 8 in)
- Position: Midfielder

Youth career
- 1999–2002: Kokushikan University

Senior career*
Years	Team	Apps	(Gls)
2003–2015	Kataller Toyama	367	(57)
- * Club domestic league appearances and goals as of 23 February 2016

Daisuke Asahi (朝日 大輔, Asahi Daisuke; born July 26, 1980) is a former Japanese football player.

== Club statistics ==
Updated to 23 February 2016.

Club performance			League		Cup		Total	
Season	Club	League	Apps	Goals	Apps	Goals	Apps	Goals
Japan			League		Emperor's Cup		Total	
1999	Kokushikan University	JFL	2	0	0	0	2	0
2000	Kokushikan University	JFL	3	0	–		3	0
2001	Kokushikan University	JFL	19	1	–		19	1
2002	Kokushikan University	JFL	9	2	1	0	10	2
2003	YKK AP	JFL	22	0	–		22	0
2004	YKK AP	JFL	29	8	–		29	8
2005	YKK AP	JFL	11	0	–		11	0
2006	YKK AP	JFL	11	2	0	0	11	2
2007	YKK AP	JFL	33	9	–		33	9
2008	Kataller Toyama	JFL	33	10	2	0	35	10
2009	Kataller Toyama	J2 League	43	8	1	0	44	8
2010	Kataller Toyama	J2 League	36	7	1	0	37	7
2011	Kataller Toyama	J2 League	38	6	2	1	40	7
2012	Kataller Toyama	J2 League	15	2	1	0	16	2
2013	Kataller Toyama	J2 League	27	2	0	0	27	2
2014	Kataller Toyama	J2 League	13	1	0	0	13	1
2015	Kataller Toyama	J3 League	23	0	–		23	0
Total			367	58	8	1	375	59
