= Yoshikawa Station =

Yoshikawa Station is the name of three train stations in Japan:

1. Yoshikawa Station (Ishikawa) (良川駅)
2. Yoshikawa Station (Saitama) (吉川駅)
3. Yoshikawa Station (Kochi) (よしかわ駅)
