= 2017 Renofa Yamaguchi FC season =

Renofa Yamaguchi FC
2017 season
- Manager: Nobuhiro Ueno; Shinji Sarusawa; Carlos Mayor
- Stadium: Ishin Memorial Park Stadium
- J2 League: 20th

2017 Renofa Yamaguchi FC season.

== J2 League ==
=== League table ===
Pos	Team	Pld	W	D	L	GF	GA	GD	Pts
19	Kamatamare Sanuki	42	8	14	20	41	61	−20	38
20	Renofa Yamaguchi	42	11	5	26	48	69	−21	38
21	Roasso Kumamoto	42	9	10	23	36	59	−23	37

Updated to match(es) played on 28 November 2017. Source: 2017 MEIJI YASUDA J2 LEAGUE League table
Rules for classification: 1) Points; 2) Goal difference; 3) Goals scored

=== Match details ===
J2 League match details
Match	Date	Team	Score	Team	Venue	Attendance
1	2017.02.26	FC Gifu	2-2	Renofa Yamaguchi FC	Gifu Nagaragawa Stadium	6,587
2	2017.03.05	Renofa Yamaguchi FC	1-2	Avispa Fukuoka	Ishin Memorial Park Stadium	9,651
3	2017.03.12	Oita Trinita	2-0	Renofa Yamaguchi FC	Oita Bank Dome	11,370
4	2017.03.19	Renofa Yamaguchi FC	0-2	Tokyo Verdy	Ishin Memorial Park Stadium	4,583
5	2017.03.26	Renofa Yamaguchi FC	1-0	Kamatamare Sanuki	Ishin Memorial Park Stadium	4,254
6	2017.04.01	Mito HollyHock	1-1	Renofa Yamaguchi FC	K's denki Stadium Mito	3,072
7	2017.04.08	Renofa Yamaguchi FC	1-1	Tokushima Vortis	Ishin Memorial Park Stadium	4,013
8	2017.04.15	Renofa Yamaguchi FC	0-1	JEF United Chiba	Ishin Memorial Park Stadium	4,287
9	2017.04.22	Nagoya Grampus	0-2	Renofa Yamaguchi FC	Paloma Mizuho Stadium	8,883
10	2017.04.29	Renofa Yamaguchi FC	0-3	V-Varen Nagasaki	Ishin Memorial Park Stadium	5,503
11	2017.05.03	Shonan Bellmare	1-0	Renofa Yamaguchi FC	Shonan BMW Stadium Hiratsuka	8,393
12	2017.05.07	Ehime FC	2-1	Renofa Yamaguchi FC	Ningineer Stadium	3,858
13	2017.05.13	Renofa Yamaguchi FC	1-1	Kyoto Sanga FC	Ishin Memorial Park Stadium	4,220
14	2017.05.17	Thespakusatsu Gunma	2-1	Renofa Yamaguchi FC	Shoda Shoyu Stadium Gunma	1,617
15	2017.05.21	Montedio Yamagata	3-2	Renofa Yamaguchi FC	ND Soft Stadium Yamagata	6,936
16	2017.05.27	Renofa Yamaguchi FC	0-1	FC Machida Zelvia	Shimonoseki Stadium	3,369
17	2017.06.03	Yokohama FC	1-0	Renofa Yamaguchi FC	NHK Spring Mitsuzawa Football Stadium	3,575
18	2017.06.11	Renofa Yamaguchi FC	0-1	Fagiano Okayama	Ishin Memorial Park Stadium	6,061
19	2017.06.17	Zweigen Kanazawa	3-2	Renofa Yamaguchi FC	Ishikawa Athletics Stadium	4,283
20	2017.06.25	Roasso Kumamoto	0-2	Renofa Yamaguchi FC	Egao Kenko Stadium	4,568
21	2017.07.01	Renofa Yamaguchi FC	1-2	Matsumoto Yamaga FC	Ishin Memorial Park Stadium	5,892
22	2017.07.09	Renofa Yamaguchi FC	2-0	Montedio Yamagata	Ishin Memorial Park Stadium	4,567
23	2017.07.15	Kamatamare Sanuki	1-3	Renofa Yamaguchi FC	Pikara Stadium	3,707
24	2017.07.23	Fagiano Okayama	2-1	Renofa Yamaguchi FC	City Light Stadium	11,343
25	2017.07.29	Renofa Yamaguchi FC	1-2	Yokohama FC	Ishin Memorial Park Stadium	7,450
26	2017.08.05	Renofa Yamaguchi FC	1-2	Roasso Kumamoto	Ishin Memorial Park Stadium	4,999
27	2017.08.11	JEF United Chiba	2-1	Renofa Yamaguchi FC	Fukuda Denshi Arena	11,550
28	2017.08.16	Renofa Yamaguchi FC	3-2	Thespakusatsu Gunma	Ishin Memorial Park Stadium	5,658
29	2017.08.20	Tokushima Vortis	5-0	Renofa Yamaguchi FC	Pocarisweat Stadium	4,430
30	2017.08.26	Renofa Yamaguchi FC	2-3	Oita Trinita	Ishin Memorial Park Stadium	6,867
31	2017.09.02	Kyoto Sanga FC	1-2	Renofa Yamaguchi FC	Kyoto Nishikyogoku Athletic Stadium	4,896
32	2017.09.09	Renofa Yamaguchi FC	3-5	Shonan Bellmare	Ishin Memorial Park Stadium	4,858
33	2017.09.16	Renofa Yamaguchi FC	0-1	FC Gifu	Ishin Memorial Park Stadium	3,646
34	2017.09.24	Matsumoto Yamaga FC	2-3	Renofa Yamaguchi FC	Matsumotodaira Park Stadium	12,817
35	2017.09.30	Avispa Fukuoka	2-1	Renofa Yamaguchi FC	Level5 Stadium	9,050
36	2017.10.07	Renofa Yamaguchi FC	1-3	Nagoya Grampus	Ishin Memorial Park Stadium	6,902
37	2017.10.15	V-Varen Nagasaki	2-1	Renofa Yamaguchi FC	Transcosmos Stadium Nagasaki	5,545
38	2017.10.21	Renofa Yamaguchi FC	1-0	Mito HollyHock	Shimonoseki Stadium	3,538
39	2017.10.29	Renofa Yamaguchi FC	0-1	Zweigen Kanazawa	Ishin Memorial Park Stadium	4,823
40	2017.11.05	Tokyo Verdy	1-2	Renofa Yamaguchi FC	Ajinomoto Stadium	6,529
41	2017.11.12	FC Machida Zelvia	0-1	Renofa Yamaguchi FC	Machida Stadium	5,478
42	2017.11.19	Renofa Yamaguchi FC	1-1	Ehime FC	Ishin Memorial Park Stadium	9,397
