= Uozu Momoyama Sports Park Stadium =

Stadium in Uzou, Toyama Prefecture, Japan

- 魚津桃山運動公園陸上競技場
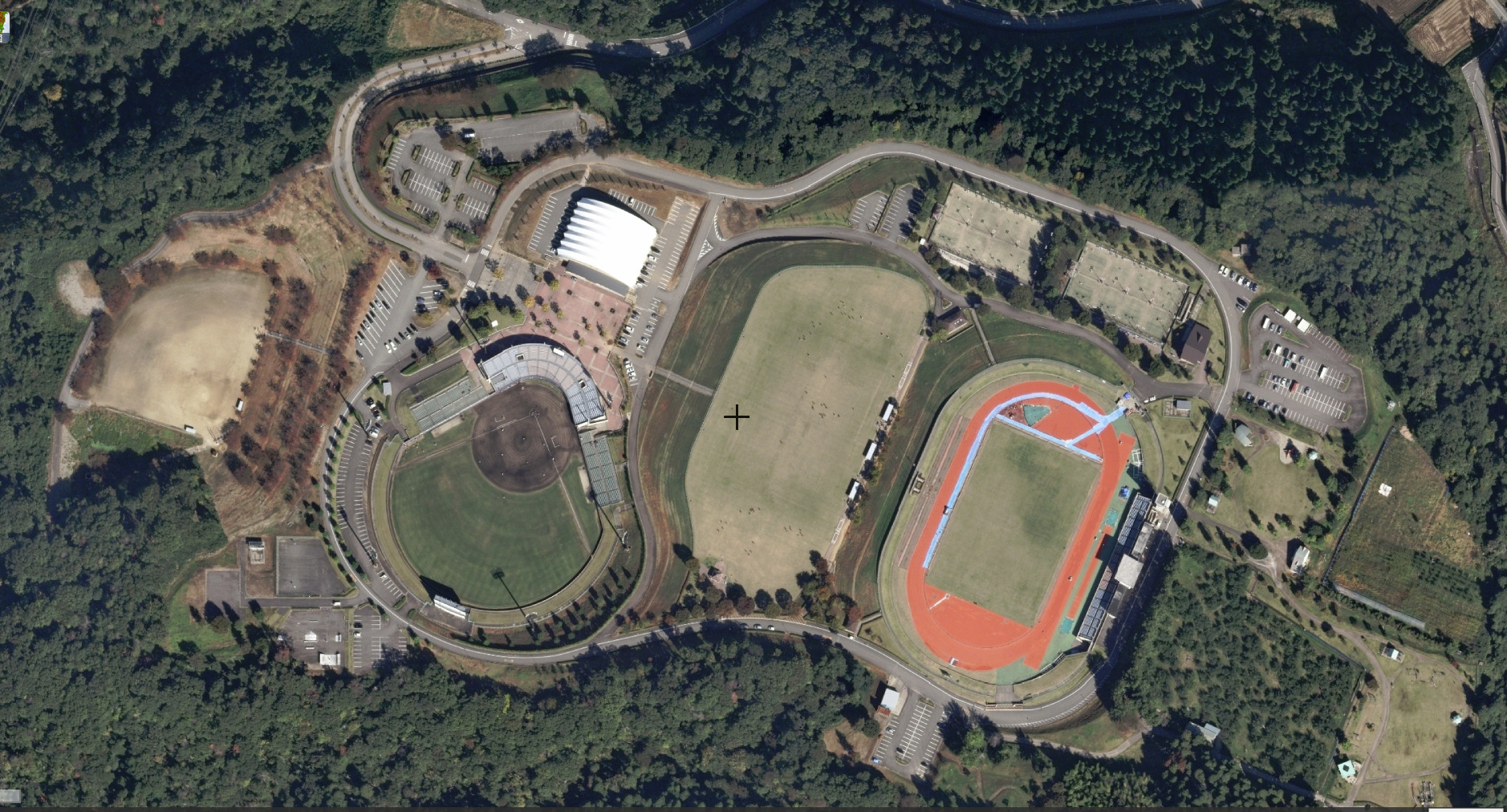
- Interactive map of Uozu Momoyama Sports Park Stadium
- Location: Uozu, Toyama, Japan
- Coordinates: 36.7960°N 137.4343°E
- Owner: Uozu City
- Capacity: 6,420

Construction
- Opened: 1987

Website
- Official site

Uozu Momoyama Sports Park Stadium (魚津桃山運動公園陸上競技場) is an athletic stadium in Uozu, Toyama Prefecture, Japan.

It is one of the home stadiums of football club Kataller Toyama.
