= Takuya Kokeguchi =

Japanese footballer (born 1985)

Takuya Kokeguchi 苔口 卓也
Personal information
- Full name: Takuya Kokeguchi
- Date of birth: 13 July 1985 (age 41)
- Place of birth: Okayama, Okayama, Japan
- Height: 1.79 m (5 ft 10 1/2 in)
- Position: Forward

Youth career
- 2001–2003: Tamano Konan High School

Senior career*
Years	Team	Apps	(Gls)
2004–2009	Cerezo Osaka	86	(4)
2008	→ JEF United Chiba (loan)	9	(0)
2010–2019	Kataller Toyama	282	(59)

International career
2005	Japan U-20	2	(0)
Medal record
Representing Japan
AFC U-19 Championship
Bronze medal – third place	2004 Malaysia
- * Club domestic league appearances and goals as of 1 January 2020

Takuya Kokeguchi (苔口 卓也, Kokeguchi Takuya; born 13 July 1985) is a Japanese former football player who last played for Kataller Toyama.

== Club career ==
After a decade with Kataller Toyama, Kokeguchi retired at the end of the 2019 season.

== National team career ==
In June 2005, Kokeguchi was selected Japan U-20 national team for 2005 World Youth Championship. At this tournament, he played 2 matches.

== Career statistics ==
Updated to 1 January 2020.

Appearances and goals by club, season and competition
Club	Season	League			Emperor's Cup		J.League Cup		Total	
Club	Season	Division	Apps	Goals	Apps	Goals	Apps	Goals	Apps	Goals
Cerezo Osaka	2004	J1 League	21	1	1	0	2	0	24	1
Cerezo Osaka	2005	J1 League	16	1	2	0	2	0	20	1
Cerezo Osaka	2006	J1 League	16	0	1	0	2	0	19	0
Cerezo Osaka	2007	J2 League	27	1	0	0	—		27	1
JEF United Chiba	2008	J1 League	9	0	0	0	3	0	12	0
Cerezo Osaka	2009	J2 League	6	1	0	0	—		6	1
Kataller Toyama	2010	J2 League	30	5	0	0	—		30	5
Kataller Toyama	2011	J2 League	31	8	1	0	—		32	8
Kataller Toyama	2012	J2 League	25	4	1	0	—		26	4
Kataller Toyama	2013	J2 League	34	11	1	0	—		35	11
Kataller Toyama	2014	J2 League	38	8	2	0	—		40	8
Kataller Toyama	2015	J3 League	32	7	—		—		32	7
Kataller Toyama	2016	J3 League	30	5	1	0	—		31	5
Kataller Toyama	2017	J3 League	28	9	2	0	—		30	9
Kataller Toyama	2018	J3 League	21	2	2	0	—		23	2
Kataller Toyama	2019	J3 League	13	0	1	0	—		14	0
Career total			377	63	15	0	9	0	401	63
