= Makoto Nishino =

Japanese footballer

Personal information
- Date of birth: July 3, 1984 (age 42)
- Place of birth: Kobe, Hyōgo, Japan
- Height: 1.72 m (5 ft 7 1/2 in)
- Position: Midfielder

Youth career
- 2003–2006: Ritsumeikan University

Senior career*
| Years | Team | Apps | (Gls) |
| 2007–2012 | Kataller Toyama | 162 | (5) |
| Total | | 162 | (5) |
- * Club domestic league appearances and goals

Makoto Nishino (西野 誠, Nishino Makoto; born March 7, 1984) is a former Japanese football player. His brother is Kohei Nishino.
