= Shunsuke Fukuda =

Japanese footballer

Personal information
- Date of birth: 17 April 1986 (age 40)
- Place of birth: Misato, Saitama, Japan
- Height: 1.86 m (6 ft 1 in)
- Position: Centre-back

Team information
- Current team: Giravanz Kitakyushu
- Number: 28

Youth career
- 2005–2008: Hosei University

Senior career*
Years	Team	Apps	(Gls)
2009–	Omiya Ardija	32	(2)
2011–2012	→ Kataller Toyama (loan)	54	(6)
2016	→ Giravanz Kitakyushu (loan)	23	(0)
2017–	Giravanz Kitakyushu		
- * Club domestic league appearances and goals as of 23 February 2017

Shunsuke Fukuda (福田 俊介, Fukuda Shunsuke; born 17 April 1986) is a Japanese footballer who plays as a centre-back for Giravanz Kitakyushu in the J. League.

== Career statistics ==
Updated to 23 February 2017.

Appearances and goals by club, season and competition
Club	Season	League			Emperor's Cup		J.League Cup		Total	
Club	Season	Division	Apps	Goals	Apps	Goals	Apps	Goals	Apps	Goals
Omiya Ardija	2009	J1 League	3	0	0	0	2	0	5	0
Omiya Ardija	2010	J1 League	7	0	2	0	4	0	13	0
Omiya Ardija	2011	J1 League	0	0	–		–		0	0
Kataller Toyama	2011	J2 League	19	2	2	1	–		21	3
Kataller Toyama	2012	J2 League	35	4	1	0	–		36	4
Omiya Ardija	2013	J1 League	1	0	0	0	–		1	0
Omiya Ardija	2014	J1 League	9	0	4	0	–		13	0
Omiya Ardija	2015	J2 League	12	2	1	0	–		13	2
Omiya Ardija	2016	J1 League	2	0	–		1	0	3	0
Giravanz Kitakyushu	2016	J2 League	23	0	1	0	–		24	0
Career total			111	8	11	1	6	0	129	9
