= Seo Yong-duk =

South Korean footballer (born 1989)

Personal information
- Full name: Seo Yong-duk
- Date of birth: 10 September 1989 (age 37)
- Place of birth: South Korea
- Height: 1.75 m (5 ft 9 in)
- Position: Midfielder

Youth career
- Yonsei University

Senior career*
Years	Team	Apps	(Gls)
2009–2010	Omiya Ardija	5	(0)
2010	FC Tokyo	0	(0)
2011–2014	Kataller Toyama	118	(13)
2014–2015	Ulsan Hyundai	20	(1)
2016–2018	FC Anyang	34	(3)
2017–2018	→ Asan Mugunghwa (army)	19	(0)
2020	Ho Chi Minh City	13	(1)

International career^{‡}
2007–2009	South Korea U-20	17	(1)
- * Club domestic league appearances and goals as of 21 December 2019 ‡ National team caps and goals as of 9 October 2009

- Seo Yong-duk
- Hangul: 서용덕
- Hanja: 徐庸徳
- RR: Seo Yongdeok
- MR: Sŏ Yongdŏk

Seo Yong-duk (Korean: 서용덕; born 10 September 1989) is a South Korean football midfielder.

== Career ==
Seo joined Omiya Ardija in 2009. He made his debut for professional league on 18 July 2009 after coming on as a substitute in the 44th minute in Omiya Ardija's 0–3 loss away to FC Tokyo. He was a member of the South Korea national U-20 team for the 2009 FIFA U-20 World Cup.

== Club statistics ==
Club performance			League		Cup		League Cup		Total	
Season	Club	League	Apps	Goals	Apps	Goals	Apps	Goals	Apps	Goals
Japan			League		Emperor's Cup		J.League Cup		Total	
2009	Omiya Ardija	J1 League	4	0	0	0	-		4	0
2010	Omiya Ardija	J1 League	1	0	-		0	0	1	0
2010	FC Tokyo	J1 League	0	0	1	0	0	0	1	0
2011	Kataller Toyama	J2 League	29	1	1	0	-		30	1
2012	Kataller Toyama	J2 League	38	5	0	0	-		38	5
2013	Kataller Toyama	J2 League	35	7	1	0	-		36	7
2014	Kataller Toyama	J2 League					-			
Total			107	13	5	0	0	0	110	13
