= Ryoga Sekihara =

Japanese footballer

Personal information
- Full name: Ryoga Sekihara
- Date of birth: June 20, 1991 (age 35)
- Place of birth: Miyazaki, Japan
- Height: 1.71 m (5 ft 7 1/2 in)
- Position: Midfielder

Youth career
- 2007–2009: Yokohama F. Marinos

Senior career*
Years	Team	Apps	(Gls)
2010–2012	Kataller Toyama	36	(1)
2013–2015	Kamatamare Sanuki	40	(2)
Total		76	(3)
- * Club domestic league appearances and goals

Ryoga Sekihara (関原 凌河, Sekihara Ryōga; born June 20, 1991) is a former Japanese football player. He played in the J2 League for Kataller Toyama from 2010 to 2012 and for Kamatamare Sanuki from 2014 to 2015.
