= Shota Kimura (footballer) =

Japanese footballer (born 1988)

Personal information
- Full name: Shota Kimura
- Date of birth: October 17, 1988 (age 38)
- Place of birth: Tokyo, Japan
- Height: 1.80 m (5 ft 11 in)
- Position: Defender

Youth career
- 2004–2006: Yokohama F. Marinos

Senior career*
Years	Team	Apps	(Gls)
2007–2008	Ventforet Kofu	20	(1)
2009–2011	Matsumoto Yamaga FC	59	(8)
2012–2014	Kataller Toyama	95	(9)
2015	Grulla Morioka	26	(1)
Total		200	(19)
- * Club domestic league appearances and goals

Shota Kimura (木村 勝太, Kimura Shōta; born October 17, 1988) is a former Japanese football player.

Kimura previously played for Ventforet Kofu in the J2 League.

== Club statistics ==
Club performance			League		Cup		League Cup		Total	
Season	Club	League	Apps	Goals	Apps	Goals	Apps	Goals	Apps	Goals
Japan			League		Emperor's Cup		J.League Cup		Total	
2007	Ventforet Kofu	J1 League	7	0	2	1	0	0	9	1
2008	Ventforet Kofu	J2 League	13	1	0	0	-		13	1
2009	Matsumoto Yamaga FC	Regional Leagues	13	4	3	0	-		16	4
2010	Matsumoto Yamaga FC	Football League	29	4	1	1	-		30	5
2011	Matsumoto Yamaga FC	Football League	17	0	1	0	-		18	0
2012	Kataller Toyama	J2 League	35	3	1	0	-		36	3
2013	Kataller Toyama	J2 League	32	3	0	0	-		32	3
2014	Kataller Toyama	J2 League					-			
Country	Japan		149	12	8	2	0	0	157	17
Total			149	12	8	2	0	0	157	17
