= Yudai Nishikawa =

Japanese footballer

Personal information
- Date of birth: April 19, 1986 (age 40)
- Place of birth: Tokyo, Japan
- Height: 1.87 m (6 ft 1 1/2 in)
- Position: Forward

Youth career
- 2005–2008: University of Tsukuba

Senior career*
Years	Team	Apps	(Gls)
2009–2011	FC Gifu	114	(21)
2012–2014	Kataller Toyama	70	(10)
2014	→ Tochigi SC (loan)	15	(2)
2015	Tochigi SC	22	(0)
2016	Kataller Toyama	19	(2)
Total		240	(35)
- * Club domestic league appearances and goals

Yudai Nishikawa (西川 優大, Nishikawa Yudai; born April 19, 1986) is a Japanese former footballer.

== Club statistics ==
Club performance			League		Cup		League Cup		Total	
Season	Club	League	Apps	Goals	Apps	Goals	Apps	Goals	Apps	Goals
Japan			League		Emperor's Cup		J. League Cup		Total	
2009	FC Gifu	J2 League	41	11	4	1	-		45	12
2010	FC Gifu	J2 League	36	4	1	1	-		37	5
2011	FC Gifu	J2 League	37	6	1	0	-		38	6
2012	Kataller Toyama	J2 League	25	5	1	0	-		26	5
2013	Kataller Toyama	J2 League	31	5	1	0	-		32	5
2014	Kataller Toyama	J2 League	14	0	0	0	-		14	0
2014	Tochigi SC	J2 League	15	2	-		-		15	2
2015	Tochigi SC	J2 League	22	0	0	0	-		22	0
2016	Kataller Toyama	J3 League	19	2	1	0	-		20	2
Total			240	35	8	2	0	0	248	37
