= Kenta Yoshikawa =

Japanese footballer (born 1986)

Personal information
- Date of birth: May 16, 1986 (age 40)
- Place of birth: Shiga, Japan
- Height: 1.84 m (6 ft 1/2 in)
- Position: Midfielder

Youth career
- 2005–2008: Hannan University

Senior career*
Years	Team	Apps	(Gls)
2009–2010	Ehime FC	23	(0)
2011–2015	Kataller Toyama	39	(0)
2015	MIO Biwako Shiga	2	(0)
Total		64	(0)
- * Club domestic league appearances and goals

Kenta Yoshikawa (吉川 健太, Yoshikawa Kenta; born May 16, 1986) is a Japanese former football player. His brother is Takuya Yoshikawa.
