= Yuya Nagatomi =

Japanese footballer

Personal information
- Full name: Yuya Nagatomi
- Date of birth: July 30, 1982 (age 44)
- Place of birth: Fukuoka, Japan
- Height: 1.85 m (6 ft 1 in)
- Position: Forward

Youth career
- 2001–2004: Chukyo University

Senior career*
Years	Team	Apps	(Gls)
2005–2006	Ehime FC	52	(11)
2007–2011	Kataller Toyama	102	(16)
Total		154	(27)
- * Club domestic league appearances and goals

Yuya Nagatomi (永冨 裕也, Nagatomi Yuya; born July 30, 1982) is a former Japanese football player.

== Club statistics ==
Club performance			League		Cup		Total	
Season	Club	League	Apps	Goals	Apps	Goals	Apps	Goals
Japan			League		Emperor's Cup		Total	
2005	Ehime FC	Football League	26	10	2	0	28	10
2006	Ehime FC	J2 League	26	1	0	0	26	1
2007	ALO's Hokuriku	Football League	33	12	2	0	35	12
2008	Kataller Toyama	Football League	21	2	0	0	21	2
2009	Kataller Toyama	J2 League	33	2	2	0	35	2
2010	Kataller Toyama	J2 League	9	0	0	0	9	0
2011	Kataller Toyama	J2 League	6	0	0	0	6	0
Country	Japan		154	27	6	0	160	27
Total			154	27	6	0	160	27
