= Koken Kato =

Japanese footballer (born 1989)

Koken Kato 加藤 弘堅
Personal information
- Full name: Koken Kato
- Date of birth: 3 April 1989 (age 37)
- Place of birth: Chiba, Japan
- Height: 1.78 m (5 ft 10 in)
- Position: Midfielder

Team information
- Current team: AC Nagano Parceiro
- Number: 47

Youth career
- 2005–2007: Ichiritsu Funabashi High School

Senior career*
Years	Team	Apps	(Gls)
2008–2011	Kyoto Sanga	42	(1)
2012	Kataller Toyama	31	(1)
2013–2014	Thespakusatsu Gunma	72	(2)
2015–2020	Giravanz Kitakyushu	148	(4)
2021–2023	Tokyo Verdy	71	(1)
2023–	AC Nagano Parceiro	48	(2)
Medal record
Kyoto Sanga FC
Runner-up	Emperor's Cup	2011
- * Club domestic league appearances and goals as of 1 January 2026

Koken Kato (加藤 弘堅, Katō Kōken; born 3 April 1989 in Chiba) is a Japanese football player who plays for AC Nagano Parceiro.

== Early life ==
Koken was born in Chiba. He went to Ichiritsu Funabashi High School.

== Career ==
Koken made his debut for Kyoto on 4 April 2009. He scored his first goal for Kyoto on 29 April 2009, scoring in the 89th minute.

Koken made his debut for Kataller on 4 March 2012 against Fagiano Okayama. He scored his first goal for Kataller against 27 May 2012, scoring the only goal in the 55th minute in a 1–0 win.

Koken made his debut for ThespaKusatsu on 3 March 2013 against Mito HollyHock. He scored his first goal for Thespa against Roasso Kumamoto on 18 August 2013, scoring the only goal in the 65th minute in a 1–0 win.

Koken made his debut for Giravanz Kitakyushu on 1 April 2015 against Tokyo Verdy. He scored his first goal for them on 17 March 2019, scoring in the 57th minute.

Koken made his debut for Tokyo on 28 February 2021 against Ehime FC. He scored his first goal on 11 July 2021, scoring the winner in the 77th minute.

Koken made his debut for Nagano against Sagamihara on 29 July 2023, also scoring his debut goal for the club in the 63rd minute.

== Career statistics ==
Updated to 19 July 2022.

Appearances and goals by club, season and competition
Club	Season	League			Emperor's Cup		J.League Cup		Total	
Club	Season	Division	Apps	Goals	Apps	Goals	Apps	Goals	Apps	Goals
Kyoto Sanga F.C.	2008	J1 League	2	0	0	0	1	0	4	0
Kyoto Sanga F.C.	2009	J1 League	8	1	0	0	4	0	12	1
Kyoto Sanga F.C.	2010	J1 League	10	0	0	0	4	0	14	0
Kyoto Sanga F.C.	2011	J2 League	22	0	4	0	–		22	0
Kataller Toyama	2012	J2 League	31	3	0	0	–		31	3
Thespakusatsu Gunma	2013	J2 League	40	1	0	0	–		40	1
Thespakusatsu Gunma	2014	J2 League	32	1	3	0	–		35	1
Giravanz Kitakyushu	2015	J2 League	30	0	0	0	–		30	0
Giravanz Kitakyushu	2016	J2 League	21	0	2	0	–		23	0
Giravanz Kitakyushu	2017	J3 League	29	1	1	0	–		30	1
Giravanz Kitakyushu	2018	J3 League	12	0	0	0	–		12	0
Giravanz Kitakyushu	2019	J3 League	20	3	1	0	–		21	3
Giravanz Kitakyushu	2020	J2 League	36	0	–		–		36	0
Tokyo Verdy	2021	J2 League	36	1	1	0	–		37	1
Tokyo Verdy	2022	J2 League	14	0	2	0	–		16	0
Career total			343	11	14	0	9	0	366	11
