= Takuya Yoshikawa =

Japanese footballer (born 1988)

Personal information
- Full name: Takuya Yoshikawa
- Date of birth: September 1, 1988 (age 38)
- Place of birth: Shiga, Japan
- Height: 1.86 m (6 ft 1 in)
- Position: Defender

Youth career
- 2007–2010: Kyoto Sangyo University

Senior career*
Years	Team	Apps	(Gls)
2011–	Kataller Toyama	47	(1)
2013	→ Zweigen Kanazawa (loan)	28	(2)
2016–	→ Suzuka Unlimited FC (loan)		
- * Club domestic league appearances and goals as of 23 February 2016

Takuya Yoshikawa (吉川 拓也, Yoshikawa Takuya; born September 1, 1988) is a Japanese football player.

== Career statistics ==
Updated to 23 February 2016.

Appearances and goals by club, season and competition
Club	Season	League			Emperor's Cup		J.League Cup		Total	
Club	Season	Division	Apps	Goals	Apps	Goals	Apps	Goals	Apps	Goals
Kataller Toyama	2011	J2 League	9	1	1	0	—		10	1
Kataller Toyama	2012	J2 League	10	0	0	0	—		10	0
Zweigen Kanazawa	2013	JFL	28	2	3	0	—		31	2
Kataller Toyama	2014	J2 League	12	0	1	0	—		13	0
Kataller Toyama	2015	J3 League	16	0	—		—		16	0
Career total			75	3	5	0	—		80	3
