= Takayoshi Amma =

Japanese footballer and manager

Takayoshi Amma 安間 貴義
Personal information
- Full name: Takayoshi Amma
- Date of birth: May 23, 1969 (age 57)
- Place of birth: Hamamatsu, Shizuoka, Japan
- Height: 1.72 m (5 ft 7 1/2 in)
- Position: Midfielder

Youth career
- 1985–1987: Hamamatsu Commercial High School
- 1988–1991: Komazawa University

Senior career*
| Years | Team | Apps | (Gls) |
| 1992–2001 | Honda | | |

Managerial career
- 2002–2004: Honda
- 2008–2009: Ventforet Kofu
- 2010–2014: Kataller Toyama
- 2016: FC Tokyo U-23
- 2017: FC Tokyo
- 2018: FC Tokyo U-23
- 2021: FC Gifu
- 2023–2025: FC Tokyo (assistant)
- 2025: Júbilo Iwata U18
- 2025: Júbilo Iwata
- * Club domestic league appearances and goals

Takayoshi Amma (安間 貴義, Amma Takayoshi; born May 23, 1969) is a Japanese professional football manager and former player who most recently was the manager of J2 League club Júbilo Iwata.

== Playing career ==
Amma was born in Hamamatsu on May 23, 1969. After graduating from Komazawa University, he joined Honda in 1992. He was selected MVP awards in 1999 Japan Football League. He retired in 2001.

== Coaching career ==
After retirement, in 2002, Amma became a manager for Honda. In first season, the club won the champions in Japan Football League. In 2003 and 2004, the club won the 2nd place.

In 2005, he moved to J2 League club Ventforet Kofu and served as assistant coach under manager Takeshi Oki. In 2008, Amma became a manager as Oki successor. He managed Ventforet until 2009.

In 2010, he moved to J2 club Kataller Toyama and became an assistant coach under manager Hiroshi Sowa. In September 2010, Sowa was sacked for poor performance and Amma became a new manager. However the club results were bad every season and was finally relegated to J3 League in 2014 season. He resigned end of 2014 season.

In 2015, he moved to FC Tokyo and became an assistant coach. He also managed FC Tokyo U-23 in 2016. In September 2017, top team manager Yoshiyuki Shinoda was sacked and Amma became a new manager. In 2018, he returned to an assistant coach for top team and manager for FC Tokyo U-23.

== Managerial statistics ==
| Team | From | To | Record | | | | |
| Team | From | To | G | W | D | L | Win % |
|---|---|---|---|---|---|---|---|
| Ventforet Kofu | 2008 | 2009 | 93 | 43 | 27 | 23 | 46.24 |
| Kataller Toyama | 2010 | 2014 | 173 | 38 | 42 | 93 | 21.97 |
| FC Tokyo U-23 | 2016 | 2016 | 18 | 4 | 5 | 9 | 22.22 |
| FC Tokyo | 2017 | 2017 | 9 | 1 | 4 | 4 | 11.11 |
| FC Tokyo U-23 | 2018 | 2018 | 32 | 10 | 6 | 16 | 31.25 |
| Total | | | 325 | 96 | 84 | 145 | 29.54 |
