= Toyama Stadium =

Multi-purpose stadium in Toyama, Japan

Coordinates: 36°37′30″N 137°11′44″E

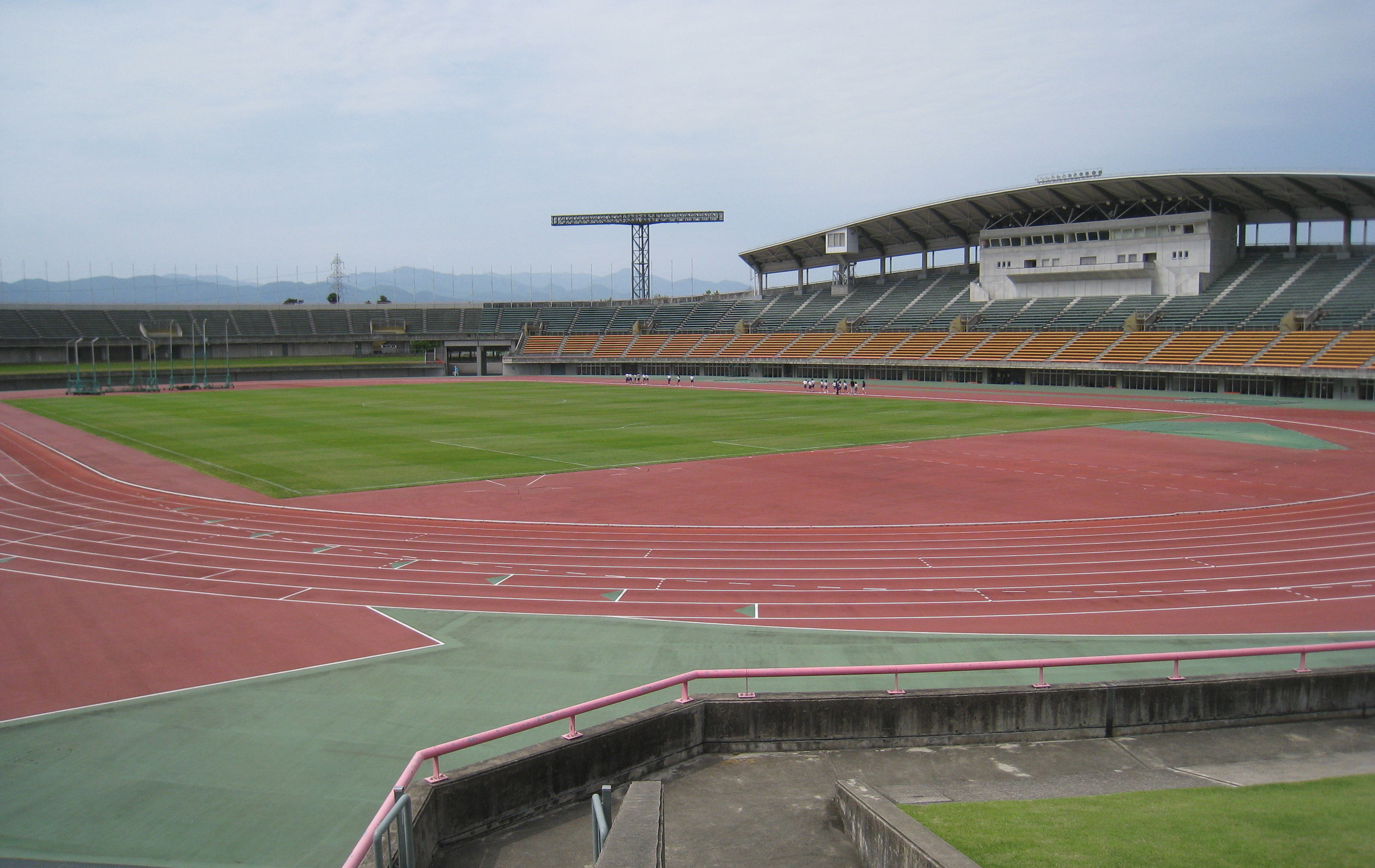
- Interactive map of Toyama Stadium
- Location: Toyama, Japan
- Owner: Toyama Prefecture
- Capacity: 25,251
- Surface: Grass
- Field size: 106 x 70 m

Construction
- Opened: 1993
- Renovated: 2000

Tenant
- Kataller Toyama

Toyama Stadium (Japanese: 富山県総合運動公園陸上競技場, Hepburn: Toyama-ken Sōgō Undō Kōen Rikujō Kyōgijō) is a multi-purpose stadium in Toyama, Japan.

It is currently used mostly for football matches and athletics events. The stadium's capacity is 25,251 people.

== History ==
In 1994, the last game of the season of Urawa Red Diamonds was held at the stadium.
