= 2004 Mito HollyHock season =

Mito HollyHock
2004 season
- Manager: Hideki Maeda
- Stadium: Kasamatsu Stadium
- J. League 2: 9th
- Emperor's Cup: 4th Round
- Top goalscorer: Yasutaka Kobayashi (9)
| Home colours | Away colours |

During the 2004 season, Mito HollyHock competed in the J. League 2, in which they finished 9th.

== Competitions ==
| Competitions | Position |
|---|---|
| J. League 2 | 9th / 12 clubs |
| Emperor's Cup | 4th Round |

== J2 League results ==
=== J. League 2 ===
| Match | Date | Venue | Opponents | Score | Attendance |
|---|---|---|---|---|---|
| 1 | 2004.03.13 | Kasamatsu Stadium | Shonan Bellmare | 0-0 | 9,155 |
| 2 | 2004.03.20 | Yamagata Park Stadium | Montedio Yamagata | 2-2 | 6,159 |
| 3 | 2004.03.27 | Kasamatsu Stadium | Avispa Fukuoka | 0-0 | 3,295 |
| 4 | 2004.04.03 | Kasamatsu Stadium | Yokohama FC | 2-2 | 2,014 |
| 5 | 2004.04.10 | [[]] | [[]] | - | 7,176 |
| 6 | 2004.04.17 | [[]] | [[]] | - | 8,105 |
| 7 | 2004.04.25 | [[]] | [[]] | - | 3,551 |
| 8 | 2004.04.29 | [[]] | [[]] | - | 2,872 |
| 9 | 2004.. | [[]] | [[]] | - | |
| 10 | 2004.. | [[]] | [[]] | - | |
| 11 | 2004.. | [[]] | [[]] | - | |
| 12 | 2004.. | [[]] | [[]] | - | |
| 13 | 2004.. | [[]] | [[]] | - | |
| 14 | 2004.. | [[]] | [[]] | - | |
| 15 | 2004.. | [[]] | [[]] | - | |
| 16 | 2004.. | [[]] | [[]] | - | |
| 17 | 2004.. | [[]] | [[]] | - | |
| 18 | 2004.. | [[]] | [[]] | - | |
| 19 | 2004.. | [[]] | [[]] | - | |
| 20 | 2004.. | [[]] | [[]] | - | |
| 21 | 2004.. | [[]] | [[]] | - | |
| 22 | 2004.. | [[]] | [[]] | - | |
| 23 | 2004.. | [[]] | [[]] | - | |
| 24 | 2004.. | [[]] | [[]] | - | |
| 25 | 2004.. | [[]] | [[]] | - | |
| 26 | 2004.. | [[]] | [[]] | - | |
| 27 | 2004.. | [[]] | [[]] | - | |
| 28 | 2004.. | [[]] | [[]] | - | |
| 29 | 2004.. | [[]] | [[]] | - | |
| 30 | 2004.. | [[]] | [[]] | - | |
| 31 | 2004.. | [[]] | [[]] | - | |
| 32 | 2004.. | [[]] | [[]] | - | |
| 33 | 2004.. | [[]] | [[]] | - | |
| 34 | 2004.. | [[]] | [[]] | - | |
| 35 | 2004.. | [[]] | [[]] | - | |
| 36 | 2004.. | [[]] | [[]] | - | |
| 37 | 2004.. | [[]] | [[]] | - | |
| 38 | 2004.. | [[]] | [[]] | - | |
| 39 | 2004.. | [[]] | [[]] | - | |
| 40 | 2004.. | [[]] | [[]] | - | |
| 41 | 2004.. | [[]] | [[]] | - | |
| 42 | 2004.. | [[]] | [[]] | - | |
| 43 | 2004.. | [[]] | [[]] | - | |
| 44 | 2004.. | [[]] | [[]] | - | |

Official J League Data

=== Emperor's Cup ===
| Match | Date | Venue | Opponents | Score |
|---|---|---|---|---|
| 3rd Round | 2004.10.10 | Kasamatsu Stadium | Alouette Kumamoto | 4-0 |
| 4th Round | 2004.11.12 | EDION Stadium Hiroshima | Kashima Antlers | 0-1 |

== Player statistics ==
| No. | Pos. | Player | D.o.B. (Age) | Height / Weight | J. League 2 | | Emperor's Cup | | Total | |
| No. | Pos. | Player | D.o.B. (Age) | Height / Weight | Apps | Goals | Apps | Goals | Apps | Goals |
|---|---|---|---|---|---|---|---|---|---|---|
| 1 | GK | Koji Homma | April 27, 1977 (aged 26) | cm / kg | 28 | 0 | | | | |
| 2 | DF | Masanori Kizawa | June 2, 1969 (aged 34) | cm / kg | 19 | 0 | | | | |
| 3 | DF | Takafumi Yoshimoto | May 13, 1978 (aged 25) | cm / kg | 15 | 2 | | | | |
| 4 | DF | Rikiya Kawamae | August 20, 1971 (aged 32) | cm / kg | 13 | 1 | | | | |
| 5 | DF | Naoki Mori | November 21, 1977 (aged 26) | cm / kg | 32 | 2 | | | | |
| 6 | DF | Tsuyoshi Tanikawa | April 25, 1980 (aged 23) | cm / kg | 8 | 1 | | | | |
| 7 | MF | Kenji Hada | June 27, 1981 (aged 22) | cm / kg | 30 | 2 | | | | |
| 8 | MF | Takamichi Seki | January 16, 1981 (aged 23) | cm / kg | 37 | 1 | | | | |
| 9 | FW | Yasutaka Kobayashi | June 15, 1980 (aged 23) | cm / kg | 40 | 9 | | | | |
| 10 | MF | Daisuke Kimori | July 28, 1977 (aged 26) | cm / kg | 32 | 1 | | | | |
| 11 | FW | Kazushi Isoyama | January 8, 1975 (aged 29) | cm / kg | 39 | 3 | | | | |
| 13 | MF | Yoshio Kitajima | October 29, 1975 (aged 28) | cm / kg | 27 | 0 | | | | |
| 14 | MF | Taijiro Kurita | March 3, 1975 (aged 29) | cm / kg | 34 | 0 | | | | |
| 15 | FW | Tsuyoshi Kaneko | April 8, 1983 (aged 20) | cm / kg | 0 | 0 | | | | |
| 15 | DF | Shingo Morita | December 9, 1978 (aged 25) | cm / kg | 8 | 1 | | | | |
| 16 | FW | Atsushi Matsuura | January 10, 1982 (aged 22) | cm / kg | 18 | 2 | | | | |
| 17 | DF | Keita Isozaki | November 17, 1980 (aged 23) | cm / kg | 34 | 4 | | | | |
| 18 | FW | Kentaro Yoshida | October 5, 1980 (aged 23) | cm / kg | 15 | 0 | | | | |
| 19 | FW | Shogo Sakurai | April 3, 1984 (aged 19) | cm / kg | 0 | 0 | | | | |
| 19 | MF | Shunta Nagai | July 12, 1982 (aged 21) | cm / kg | 15 | 0 | | | | |
| 20 | DF | Yuichi Shibakoya | June 16, 1983 (aged 20) | cm / kg | 39 | 0 | | | | |
| 21 | GK | Go Kaburaki | August 26, 1977 (aged 26) | cm / kg | 3 | 0 | | | | |
| 22 | DF | Shinobu Ito | May 7, 1983 (aged 20) | cm / kg | 33 | 0 | | | | |
| 23 | DF | Mitsutada Ikeda | June 18, 1984 (aged 19) | cm / kg | 0 | 0 | | | | |
| 24 | MF | Chihiro Matoba | February 26, 1980 (aged 24) | cm / kg | 0 | 0 | | | | |
| 24 | DF | Toshihiro Yahata | May 29, 1980 (aged 23) | cm / kg | 0 | 0 | | | | |
| 25 | DF | Kosuke Suda | February 4, 1980 (aged 24) | cm / kg | 21 | 0 | | | | |
| 26 | MF | Kinoto Saito | July 8, 1976 (aged 27) | cm / kg | 0 | 0 | | | | |
| 27 | FW | Yuya Iwadate | May 25, 1985 (aged 18) | cm / kg | 0 | 0 | | | | |
| 28 | MF | Shōhei Ogura | September 8, 1985 (aged 18) | cm / kg | 15 | 0 | | | | |
| 29 | MF | Kazuhiko Shingyoji | February 5, 1986 (aged 18) | cm / kg | 8 | 0 | | | | |
| 30 | MF | Marquinho | March 7, 1976 (aged 28) | cm / kg | 19 | 1 | | | | |
| 31 | GK | Hiroyuki Takeda | November 30, 1983 (aged 20) | cm / kg | 14 | 0 | | | | |
| 32 | DF | Masashi Owada | July 28, 1981 (aged 22) | cm / kg | 4 | 0 | | | | |

== Other pages ==
- (in Japanese) J. League official site
