= 2007 Mito HollyHock season =

Mito HollyHock
2007 season
- Manager: Hideki Maeda
- Stadium: Kasamatsu Stadium
- J. League 2: 12th
- Emperor's Cup: 4th Round
- Top goalscorer: Shogo Shiozawa (7); Kohei Nishino (7)
| Home colours | Away colours |

2007 Mito HollyHock season

== Competitions ==
| Competitions | Position |
|---|---|
| J. League 2 | 12th / 13 clubs |
| Emperor's Cup | 4th Round |

== Domestic results ==
=== J. League 2 ===
| Match | Date | Venue | Opponents | Score |
|---|---|---|---|---|
| 1 | 2007.. | | | - |
| 2 | 2007.. | | | - |
| 3 | 2007.. | | | - |
| 4 | 2007.. | | | - |
| 5 | 2007.. | | | - |
| 6 | 2007.. | | | - |
| 7 | 2007.. | | | - |
| 8 | 2007.. | | | - |
| 9 | 2007.. | | | - |
| 10 | 2007.. | | | - |
| 11 | 2007.. | | | - |
| 12 | 2007.. | | | - |
| 13 | 2007.. | | | - |
| 14 | 2007.. | | | - |
| 15 | 2007.. | | | - |
| 16 | 2007.. | | | - |
| 17 | 2007.. | | | - |
| 18 | 2007.. | | | - |
| 19 | 2007.. | | | - |
| 20 | 2007.. | | | - |
| 21 | 2007.. | | | - |
| 22 | 2007.. | | | - |
| 23 | 2007.. | | | - |
| 24 | 2007.. | | | - |
| 25 | 2007.. | | | - |
| 26 | 2007.. | | | - |
| 27 | 2007.. | | | - |
| 28 | 2007.. | | | - |
| 29 | 2007.. | | | - |
| 30 | 2007.. | | | - |
| 31 | 2007.. | | | - |
| 32 | 2007.. | | | - |
| 33 | 2007.. | | | - |
| 34 | 2007.. | | | - |
| 35 | 2007.. | | | - |
| 36 | 2007.. | | | - |
| 37 | 2007.. | | | - |
| 38 | 2007.. | | | - |
| 39 | 2007.. | | | - |
| 40 | 2007.. | | | - |
| 41 | 2007.. | | | - |
| 42 | 2007.. | | | - |
| 43 | 2007.. | | | - |
| 44 | 2007.. | | | - |
| 45 | 2007.. | | | - |
| 46 | 2007.. | | | - |
| 47 | 2007.. | | | - |
| 48 | 2007.. | | | - |

=== Emperor's Cup ===
| Match | Date | Venue | Opponents | Score |
|---|---|---|---|---|
| 3rd Round | 2007.. | | | - |
| 4th Round | 2007.. | | | - |

== Player statistics ==
| No. | Pos. | Player | D.o.B. (Age) | Height / Weight | J. League 2 | | Emperor's Cup | | Total | |
| No. | Pos. | Player | D.o.B. (Age) | Height / Weight | Apps | Goals | Apps | Goals | Apps | Goals |
|---|---|---|---|---|---|---|---|---|---|---|
| 1 | GK | Koji Homma | April 27, 1977 (aged 29) | cm / kg | 35 | 0 | | | | |
| 2 | MF | Fukutaro Shino | July 28, 1982 (aged 24) | cm / kg | 0 | 0 | | | | |
| 3 | DF | Daishi Hiramatsu | July 3, 1983 (aged 23) | cm / kg | 41 | 0 | | | | |
| 4 | DF | Kazuhiro Suzuki | November 16, 1976 (aged 30) | cm / kg | 44 | 0 | | | | |
| 5 | DF | Shinya Hatta | May 17, 1984 (aged 22) | cm / kg | 12 | 0 | | | | |
| 6 | MF | Shōhei Ogura | September 8, 1985 (aged 21) | cm / kg | 42 | 2 | | | | |
| 7 | MF | Jun Muramatsu | April 10, 1982 (aged 24) | cm / kg | 35 | 1 | | | | |
| 8 | FW | Edinaldo | April 2, 1987 (aged 19) | cm / kg | 12 | 0 | | | | |
| 9 | FW | Takaaki Suzuki | October 7, 1981 (aged 25) | cm / kg | 17 | 0 | | | | |
| 10 | MF | Kim Dong-Chan | December 19, 1981 (aged 25) | cm / kg | 0 | 0 | | | | |
| 11 | FW | Shogo Shiozawa | September 9, 1982 (aged 24) | cm / kg | 42 | 7 | | | | |
| 13 | MF | Takuya Shiihara | July 9, 1980 (aged 26) | cm / kg | 36 | 0 | | | | |
| 14 | DF | Takafumi Yoshimoto | May 13, 1978 (aged 28) | cm / kg | 30 | 4 | | | | |
| 15 | MF | Naoya Ohashi | July 23, 1987 (aged 19) | cm / kg | 0 | 0 | | | | |
| 16 | MF | Junya Kimura | September 6, 1987 (aged 19) | cm / kg | 0 | 0 | | | | |
| 17 | DF | Hiromasa Kanazawa | December 1, 1983 (aged 23) | cm / kg | 46 | 2 | | | | |
| 18 | MF | Kim Ki-Su | August 5, 1982 (aged 24) | cm / kg | 18 | 1 | | | | |
| 19 | FW | Kohei Nishino | April 15, 1982 (aged 24) | cm / kg | 38 | 7 | | | | |
| 20 | DF | Takashi Kuramoto | August 8, 1984 (aged 22) | cm / kg | 13 | 0 | | | | |
| 21 | GK | Hiroyuki Takeda | November 30, 1983 (aged 23) | cm / kg | 12 | 0 | | | | |
| 22 | MF | Kenichi Mori | October 23, 1984 (aged 22) | cm / kg | 3 | 0 | | | | |
| 23 | FW | Keisuke Endo | March 20, 1989 (aged 17) | cm / kg | 16 | 0 | | | | |
| 24 | MF | Jun Shimanuki | August 7, 1988 (aged 18) | cm / kg | 1 | 0 | | | | |
| 25 | MF | Yoshikazu Suzuki | June 1, 1982 (aged 24) | cm / kg | 38 | 2 | | | | |
| 26 | MF | Biju | September 17, 1974 (aged 32) | cm / kg | 22 | 0 | | | | |
| 27 | FW | Yuya Iwadate | May 25, 1985 (aged 21) | cm / kg | 34 | 1 | | | | |
| 28 | DF | Hiroki Kato | July 31, 1986 (aged 20) | cm / kg | 4 | 0 | | | | |
| 29 | MF | Kazuhiko Shingyoji | February 5, 1986 (aged 21) | cm / kg | 30 | 2 | | | | |
| 30 | DF | Hideyuki Nakamura | June 3, 1984 (aged 22) | cm / kg | 14 | 1 | | | | |
| 31 | GK | Yoshinobu Harada | May 17, 1986 (aged 20) | cm / kg | 1 | 0 | | | | |
| 32 | DF | Masashi Owada | July 28, 1981 (aged 25) | cm / kg | 14 | 1 | | | | |

== Other pages ==
- (in Japanese) J. League official site
