= Marquinho =

Marquinho is a diminutive name of Marcos or Marcus, may refer to:

- Marquinho, Paraná, a location in Brazil (see List of municipalities in Paraná)

== People ==
- Marcus Vinícius (footballer, born 1983), full name Marcus Vinícius da Cruz Alves Nóbrega, Brazilian footballer, also known as "Marquinho"
- Marquinho (footballer, born 1966), full name Marco Antônio dos Santos, Brazilian footballer
- Marquinho (footballer, born 1976), full name Marcos Bonifacio da Rocha, Brazilian footballer
- Marquinho (footballer, born 1982), full name Marco Aurélio Pereira Alves, Brazilian footballer
- Marquinho (footballer, born July 1986), full name Marco Antônio de Mattos Filho, Brazilian footballer
- Marquinho (footballer, born August 1986), full name Marco Aurélio Iube, Brazilian footballer
- Marquinho (footballer, born 1989), full name Marco Gomes Rodrigues, Portuguese footballer
- Marquinho (footballer, born 2002), full name Marco Antonio Marsulo Junior, Brazilian footballer
- Marquinho (futsal player), (born 1974) Brazilian futsal player

== See also ==
- Marcão (disambiguation)
- Marcos (disambiguation)
- Marquinhos (disambiguation)
