= Franca =

- Municipality
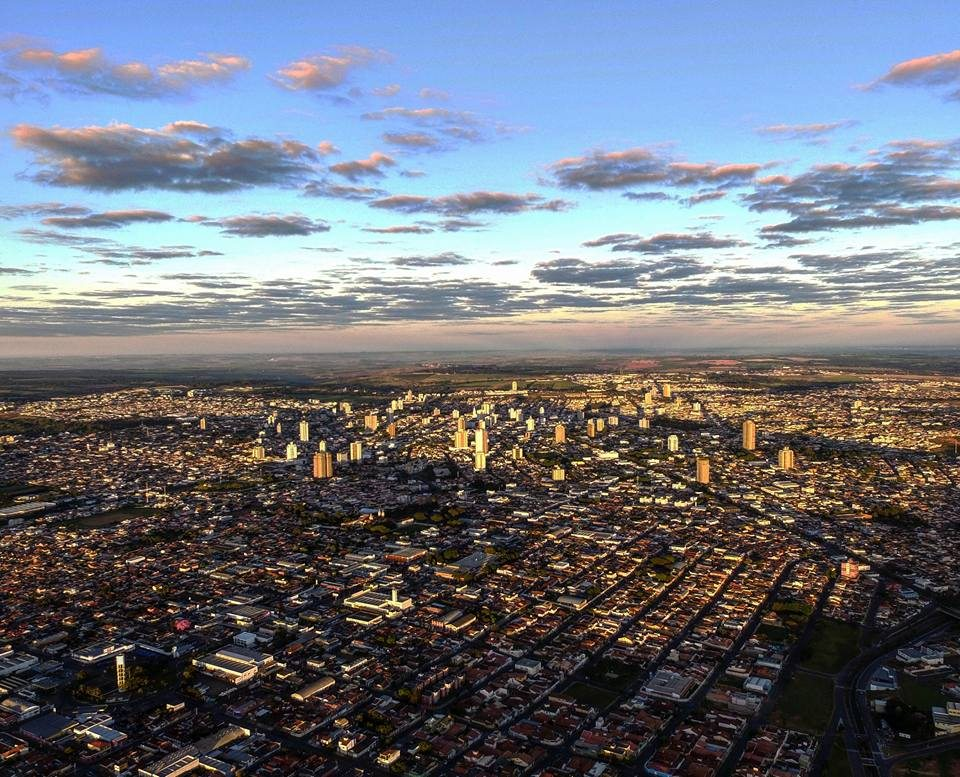
- Aerial view

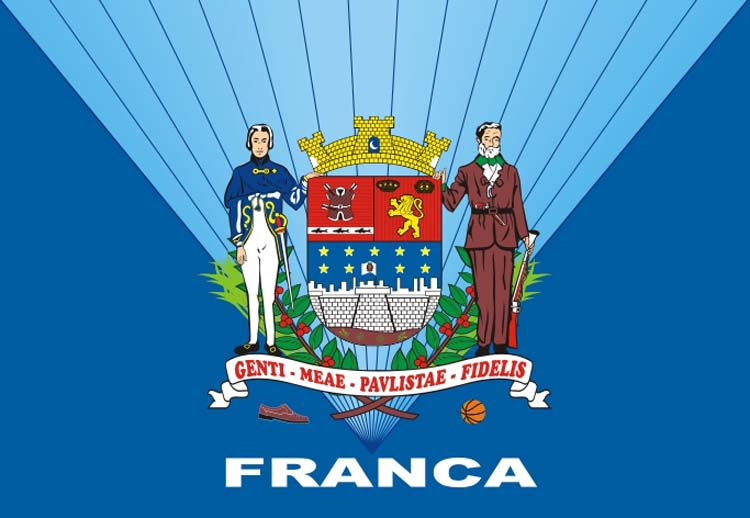
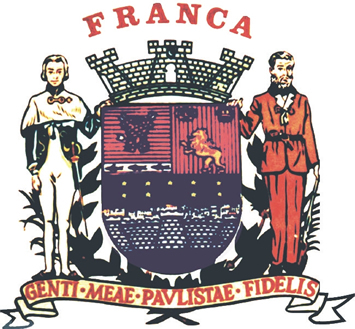
- Flag Coat of arms
- Motto: Genti Meae Paulistae Fidelis (Latin)
- Location in São Paulo state

- Location in Brazil
- Coordinates: 20°32′20″S 47°24′3″W
- Country: Brazil
- Region: Southeast
- State: São Paulo
- Founder: John VI of Portugal

Government
  - Mayor: Alexandre Ferreira (2021–2024) (MDB)

Area
  - Municipality: 606 km^{2} (234 sq mi)
  - Metro: 3,439.78 km^{2} (1,328.11 sq mi)
- Elevation: 1,040 m (3,410 ft)

Population (2022 Brazilian census)
  - Municipality: 352,537
  - Estimate (2025): 365,494
  - Density: 582/km^{2} (1,510/sq mi)
  - Metro: 483,383
- Time zone: UTC−3 (BRT)
- Postal code: 14400-000
- Area code: +55 16
- Website: www.franca.sp.gov.br

Franca is a municipality in the state of São Paulo, Brazil. The city is located in the northeastern portion of the state, 401 km (249 mi) from the state capital São Paulo, and 676 km (420 mi) from Brasilia. It covers a total area of 605.679 km^{2} of which 86.92 km^{2} comprises the urban area. As of the 2022 Census, the city's population was 352,536.

It is recognized as the "National Capital of Footwear" and "National Basketball Capital" in Brazil, serving as the industrial and economic hub for a region of 19 municipalities, with a combined population of 672,053, between the states of São Paulo and Minas Gerais.

In 2018, the city was ranked as the fifth best place to live in Brazil, and in 2023, as the sixth safest medium sized city in the country. It has also maintained its position as one of the Brazilian cities with the best urban sanitation ratios.

Franca was founded as a parish in 1805, initially part of Mogi Mirim until 1824. Its city status was granted in 1856.

== History ==
The history of Franca begins with the bandeiras of Bartolomeu Bueno da Silva (The Anhanguera) in the 18th century.

During the opening of the route known as "Caminho de Goiás" (route to Goiás), new settlements were established along the route to serve as resting / stopping points for the entourages travelling along the way from São Paulo to Goiás, in search of gold.

The settlement where the city is now located was formerly known as Pouso dos Bagres (stop of the catfishes).

In 1819, Franca was visited by French naturalist Auguste de Saint-Hilaire who dedicated the following message:

"The village of Franca, where I landed, is pleasantly in the midst of vast pastures, in an uncovered region, sown by bushes and cut by deep valleys. This charming village occupies the center of a path of land, wide and rounded, on each side. bathed by a small stream. At the time of my voyage, there were only about fifty houses there, but the sites for the construction of a large number of them were already marked, and it was easy to see that Franca would not take long to acquire greatness.

The parish of Franca was founded on December 03, 1805, being part of the territory of Vila de Mogi Mirim until 1824, when it was emancipated by João VI and named Vila Franca do Imperador in honor of the Emperor Pedro I of Brazil. It received the status of city on April 24, 1856.

Around 1890, Franca was served by the Estrada de Ferro Mogiana, however, the railroad branch was deactivated after the construction of a new branch connecting Ribeirão Preto to Uberaba. Due to the expansion of coffee production between the XIX and XX centuries, many italian immigrants settled in Franca, and the first shoe factory emerged in the late 1920s.

Franca took part in the Constitutionalist Revolution of 1932, losing six residents who fought to death for São Paulo.

== Economy ==
Franca is one of the largest footwear producers in Brazil and Latin America, home to thousands of medium and large industries, including those focused on footwear component production and design centers that train new professionals for domestic and international careers. It hosts a diverse industrial sector, including production in metal, furniture, food, and beverages. Franca is also located in the Alta Mogiana region, known for its coffee production due to the abundance of fertile soil and a favorable climate for cultivation. The city has also had a long-standing jewelry and diamond industry, making it one of Brazil's prominent diamond-cutting centers.

In 2021, the estimated Gross domestic product (GDP) of Franca reached R$11.28 billion. The GDP per capita was R$31,450.10, while external revenue, including federal and state transfers, accounted for 58.65% of total revenue in 2023. The average monthly earnings of formal workers in 2022 were 2.1 times the value of the national minimum wage in Brazil.

== Transportation ==
=== Air ===
The city is served by Ten. Lund Presotto Airport.

=== Highways ===
- SP-334 – Candido Portinari (Franca to Ribeirão Preto)
- SP-345 – Engenheiro Ronan Rocha (Franca to Minas Gerais)
- SP-345 – Prefeito Fábio Talarico (Franca to Barretos)

==== Minor highways ====
- Felipe Calixto (north quarter to Ribeirão Corrente)
- Rio Negro e Solimões (south quarter to Batatais)
- João Traficante (east quarter to Ibiraci)
- Tancredo Neves (east quarter to Claraval)
- Engenho Queimado (west quarter to Ribeirão Corrente)
- Nestor Ferreira (west quarter to Restinga)

=== Rail ===
The railway system in the city ceased operations in 1980, and its train station, first opened in 1887, was officially closed in 1983.

== Geography ==
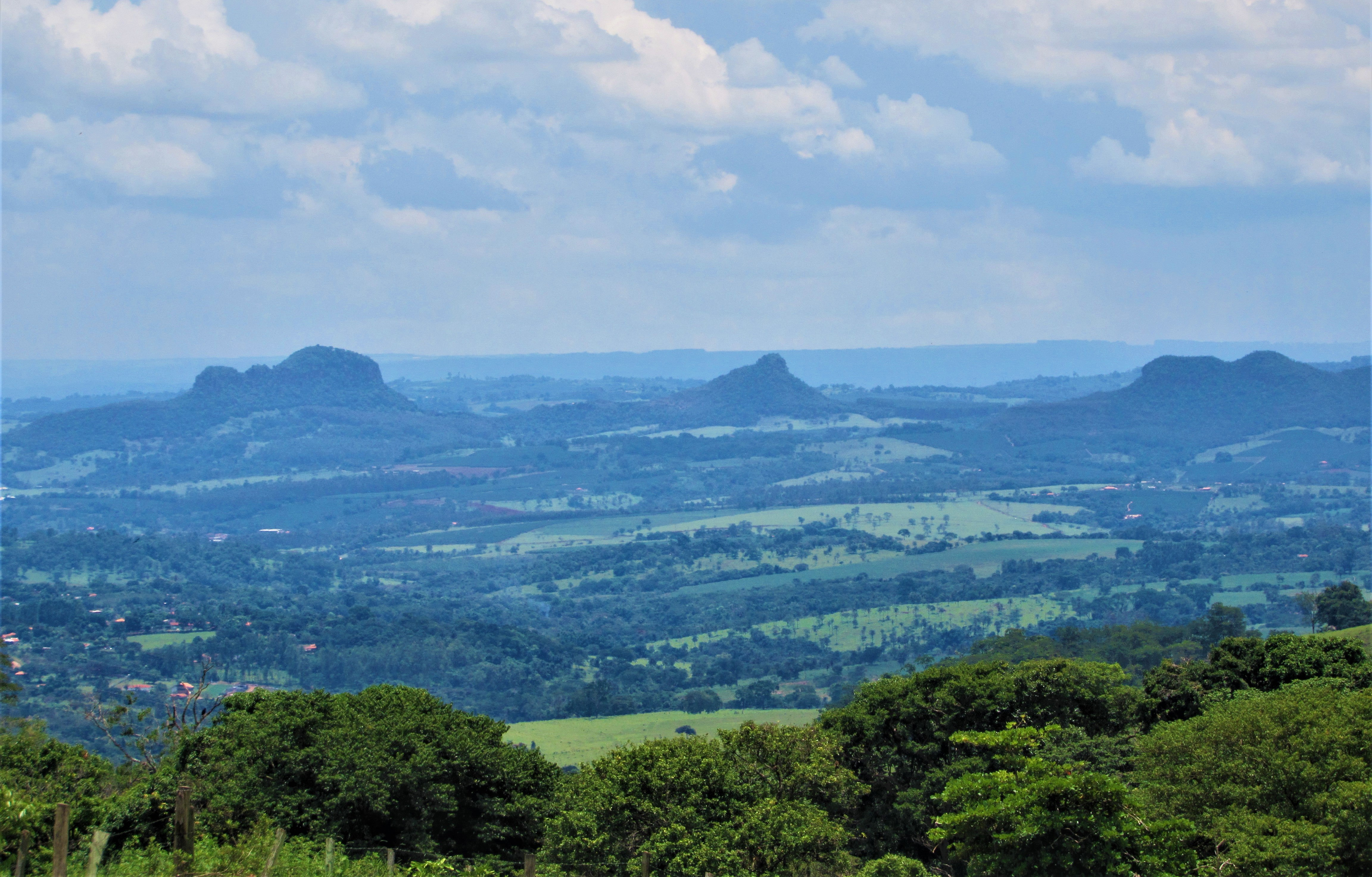
Franca is located on a plateau where Serra da Canastra National Park can be sighted.

Franca is located in the northeastern region of the state of São Paulo, standing as the fifth highest municipality in the state at an altitude of 1,040 m above the sea level. The territory of Franca is covered by sandy soils dominated by the sandstones of Bauru, and Botucatu. Vegetation is dominated by grasses, and the forests are restricted to mountainous slopes. The municipality shares borders with its neighbors Batatais, Cristais Paulista, Patrocínio Paulista, Ibiraci and Claraval.

=== Hydrography ===
The basin of Rio Canoas provide water for the city and the surrounding area. The municipality is traversed by various waterways, including the Rio das Canoas, Rio Pouso Alegre, Rio São João, and Ribeirão Salgado.

=== Climate ===
Franca has a tropical savanna climate (Aw), with milder temperatures due to its elevation. The city experiences dry winters, rainy summers, and moderate temperatures year-round. Prior to the current climate classification (1961-1990), it was classified as having a humid subtropical climate (Cwa). The lowest recorded temperature was 0 °C on July 5, 1953, and the highest temperature was 37.8 °C on October 15, 2014.

Occurrence of rain is high and it is one of the rainiest cities in the State of São Paulo. The highest recorded rainfall reached 146 millimeters on March 28, 1931, and recently, 133.7 millimeters was recorded on November 21, 2018.

Climate data for Franca (1991–2020 normals, extremes 1931–2010)
Month	Jan	Feb	Mar	Apr	May	Jun	Jul	Aug	Sep	Oct	Nov	Dec	Year
Record high °C (°F)	35.3 (95.5)	34.4 (93.9)	33.4 (92.1)	31.9 (89.4)	30.2 (86.4)	30.0 (86.0)	30.0 (86.0)	33.7 (92.7)	36.6 (97.9)	37.8 (100.0)	35.2 (95.4)	34.0 (93.2)	37.8 (100.0)
Mean daily maximum °C (°F)	27.6 (81.7)	28.0 (82.4)	27.5 (81.5)	26.8 (80.2)	24.7 (76.5)	24.5 (76.1)	24.9 (76.8)	26.9 (80.4)	28.4 (83.1)	28.8 (83.8)	27.6 (81.7)	27.6 (81.7)	26.9 (80.4)
Daily mean °C (°F)	22.6 (72.7)	22.7 (72.9)	22.4 (72.3)	21.6 (70.9)	19.2 (66.6)	18.7 (65.7)	18.8 (65.8)	20.5 (68.9)	22.1 (71.8)	22.8 (73.0)	22.3 (72.1)	22.5 (72.5)	21.4 (70.5)
Mean daily minimum °C (°F)	19.2 (66.6)	19.2 (66.6)	18.9 (66.0)	17.8 (64.0)	15.4 (59.7)	14.8 (58.6)	14.6 (58.3)	15.8 (60.4)	17.3 (63.1)	18.4 (65.1)	18.3 (64.9)	18.9 (66.0)	17.4 (63.3)
Record low °C (°F)	9.6 (49.3)	10.0 (50.0)	10.9 (51.6)	4.7 (40.5)	3.3 (37.9)	0.0 (32.0)	0.0 (32.0)	1.2 (34.2)	3.6 (38.5)	4.8 (40.6)	9.0 (48.2)	10.4 (50.7)	0.0 (32.0)
Average precipitation mm (inches)	319.6 (12.58)	239.1 (9.41)	205.1 (8.07)	82.9 (3.26)	57.1 (2.25)	23.0 (0.91)	15.3 (0.60)	19.9 (0.78)	60.3 (2.37)	147.4 (5.80)	201.6 (7.94)	279.4 (11.00)	1,650.7 (64.99)
Average precipitation days (≥ 1.0 mm)	18	14	14	7	4	2	2	2	5	9	13	18	108
Average relative humidity (%)	78.4	76.9	77.3	72.0	69.4	64.9	58.0	51.9	55.8	64.1	72.8	77.9	68.3
Mean monthly sunshine hours	118.7	122.7	171.4	216.8	228.7	239.3	258.5	258.2	206.9	171.9	147.5	133.3	2,273.9
Source: Instituto Nacional de Meteorologia

== Demographics ==
As of the 2022 census, Franca had a population density of 582.05 inhabitants per square kilometer (1,507.5/sq mi). The municipality belongs to the Immediate Geographic Region of Franca, which encompasses 10 other municipalities with a combined population of 420,000 as of 2017. The region is part of the Intermediate Geographic Region of Ribeirão Preto.

In 2010, the Human Development Index (HDI) for Franca was 0.780, placing it in the high human development category. Among its components, the HDI-M for income was 0.755, longevity was 0.800, and education was 0.906.

By 2011, the majority of residents lived in urban areas, totaling 315,355, while 5,657 lived in rural zones. The school enrollment rate for children between 6 and 14 years old was 98.2%. The life expectancy was 73.03 years with a literacy rate of 96.37%. The fertility rate was 2.26 children per woman. The infant mortality rate was 12.66 per 1,000 live births, equivalent to 1.26%. As of the census of 2022, the infant mortality rate stood at 7.09 per 1,000 live births, while hospitalizations for diarrhea reached 6.2 per 1,000 residents.

=== Racial and ethnic composition ===
In 2011, the racial and ethnic composition consisted of 69.15% White, 23.84% Mixed-race (Pardo), 6.30% Black, 0.58% Asian, and 0.12% Indigenous. As of 2022, the population was 63.98% White, 28.26% Mixed-race (Pardo), and 7.48% Black. Asian individuals made up 0.22%, while Indigenous individuals accounted for 0.07%.

== Notable people ==
- Abdias do Nascimento, scholar and politician
- Adrianinha, basketball player
- Bianca Basílio, mixed martial artist
- Bruno Smith, footballer
- Diego Figueiredo, musician
- Estêvão Willian, footballer
- Fransérgio, footballer
- Guerrinha, basketball player
- Hélio Rubens, basketball coach, former player
- Jackson, footballer
- João do Amaral Gurgel, businessman
- João Costa, footballer
- Jaime Luiz Coelho, archbishop
- Luiza Trajano, businessperson
- Marquinhos, footballer.
- Nasa, footballer
- Odirlei Pessoni, bobsledder
- Regina Duarte, actress
- Sérgio Henrique Ferreira (1934–2016), physician and pharmacologist
- Silvinho, footballer
- Wagner Lopes, football coach

== See also ==
- Ginásio Pedrocão
- José Chiachiri Municipal Historical Museum
- List of municipalities in São Paulo
