= Marquinhos (disambiguation) =

Marquinhos, full name Marcos Aoás Corrêa (born 1994), Brazilian footballer playing for Paris Saint-Germain.

Marquinhos is a diminutive name of Marcos or Marcus, may refer to:

== Marquinhos ==
- Marcos Antônio Abdalla Leite (born 1952), Brazilian basketball player
- Marcos Antônio Cezar (born 1970), Brazilian handball player
- Marcus Alfredo de Araújo (born 1972), Brazilian footballer playing in Israel
- Marquinhos (footballer, born 1961), full name Marco Antonio Carmo Anjos, Brazilian footballer
- Marquinhos (footballer, born 1966), full name Marco Antonio da Silva, Brazilian footballer
- Marquinhos (footballer, born 1971), full name Marcos Corrêa dos Santos, Brazilian footballer
- Marquinhos (footballer, born 1976), full name Marcos Gomes de Araujo, Brazilian footballer
- Marquinhos (footballer, born 1981), full name Marcos Vicente dos Santos, Brazilian footballer
- Marquinhos (footballer, born April 1982), full name Marcos Antônio Malachias Júnior, Brazilian-born Bulgarian footballer
- Marquinhos (footballer, born August 1982), full name Marcos Aurélio Lima Barros, Brazilian footballer
- Marquinhos (footballer, born October 1982), full name Marcos Roberto da Silva Barbosa, Brazilian footballer
- Marquinhos (footballer, born June 1989), full name Marco da Silva Ignácio, Brazilian footballer
- Marquinhos (footballer, born October 1989), full name Marcos Antônio da Silva Gonçalves, Brazilian footballer
- Marquinhos (footballer, born 1992), full name Marcos Vinícius Bento, Brazilian footballer
- Marquinhos (footballer, born January 1997), full name Marcos Vinícius Sousa Natividade, Brazilian footballer
- Marquinhos (footballer, born 1999), full name José Marcos Costa Martins, Brazilian footballer
- Marquinhos (footballer, born 2003), full name Marcus Vinicius Oliveira Alencar, Brazilian football forward
- Marquinhos (footballer, born 2007), full name Marcos Felipe Vinagre Souza, Brazilian football defender
- Marcos André (footballer, born 2003), full name Marcos André de Menezes Diniz, also known as Marquinhos, Brazilian football forward
- Marquinhos Cambalhota (born 1984), full name Weimar Marcos Rodrigues, Brazilian footballer
- Marquinhos Carioca (born 1992), full name Marcus Vinícius Vidal Cunha, Brazilian footballer
- Marquinhos Gabriel (born 1990), full name Marcos Gabriel do Nascimento, Brazilian footballer who plays for Corinthians
- Marquinhos Moraes (born 1991), full name Marcos dos Santos Moraes, Brazilian footballer
- Marquinhos Paraná (born 1977), full name Antônio Marcos da Silva Filho, Brazilian footballer
- Marquinhos Pedroso (born 1993), full name Marcos Garbellotto Pedroso, Brazilian footballer
- Marquinhos Santos (born 1979), Brazilian football manager
- Marquinhos do Sul (born 1994), Brazilian footballer who plays as a winger for Brazilian club Vasco da Gama
- Marquinhos Vieira (born 1984), Brazilian basketball player

== See also ==
- Marcão (disambiguation)
- Marcos (disambiguation)
- Marquinho (disambiguation)
