= Marcão =

Marcão is an augmentative name meaning Elder Marcos or Elder Marco.

Notable people known by this name include:

- Marcão Britto (born 1970), full name Marco Antônio Valentim Britto Júnior, guitarist of Brazilian rock band Charlie Brown Jr.
- Marcão (handballer) (born 1976), full name Marcos Paulo dos Santos, Brazilian handballer
- Marcão (footballer, born 1954), full name Marco Benedito Marcelo, Brazilian footballer
- Marcão (footballer, born 1965), full name Marco Antônio de Almeida Ferreira, Brazilian footballer
- Marcão (footballer, born 1969), full name Marcos Fernando Nang, Brazilian football striker
- Marcão (footballer, born 1972), full name Marco Aurélio de Oliveira, Brazilian football manager and former footballer
- Marcão (footballer, born February 1973), full name Marcos Antônio Ronconi, Brazilian footballer
- Marcão (footballer, born April 1973), full name Marcos Antonio Aparecido Cipriano, Brazilian footballer
- Marcão (footballer, born 1975), full name Marcos Alberto Skavinski, Brazilian footballer
- Marcão (footballer, born 1976), full name Marcos Aurélio Titon, Brazilian footballer
- Marcão (footballer, born 1985), full name Marcos Assis de Santana, Brazilian footballer
- Marcão (footballer, born 1986), full name Alfredo Marcos da Silva Júnior, Brazilian footballer
- Marcão (footballer, born 1989), full name Marcos da Silva Bonfim, Brazilian footballer
- Marcão (footballer, born 1990), full name Marcus Lima Silva, Brazilian footballer
- Marcão (footballer, born 1991), full name Marcos Antonio Almeida Silva, Brazilian footballer
- Marcão (footballer, born 1994), full name Marcos Vinicius Amaral Alves, Brazilian footballer
- Marcão (footballer, born 1995), full name Marcos Wilson da Silva, Brazilian footballer
- Marcão (footballer, born 1996), full name Marcos do Nascimento Teixeira, Brazilian footballer
- Marcão (footballer, born 2001), full name Marcos Vinicius Carvalho dos Reis, Brazilian footballer
- Marcão (futsal player) (born 1984), Brazilian futsal player
- Marcão (basketball), Brazilian basketball player in the 2009–10 NBB season
- Marcos Aparecido Alves, Brazilian footballer in the 2003–04 Taça de Portugal

== See also ==
- Marcos (disambiguation)
- Marquinhos (disambiguation)
