= Kazuhiko =

- Gender: Male

Origin
- Origin: Japanese
- Meaning: Different meanings depending on the kanji used

Kazuhiko (一彦 or 和彦) is a masculine Japanese given name. Notable people with the name include:

- Kazuhiko Aoki (青木 一彦; born 1961), politician
- Kazuhiko Aoki (青木 和彦; born 1961), a video game producer
- Kazuhiko Chiba, Japanese footballer
- Kazuhiko Hasegawa (1946–2026), Japanese film director
- Kazuhiko Hosokawa, professional golfer
- Kazuhiko Ikematsu, freestyle wrestler
- Kazuhiko Inoue, a voice actor
- Kazuhiko Iwaike, known as K.A.Z, Japanese musician, guitarist and songwriter
- Kazuhiko Katō (born 1937), manga creator who uses the pen-name of Monkey Punch
- Kazuhiko Katō (1947–2009), nicknamed "Tonovan", record producer, songwriter, singer, member of Sadistic Mika Band
- Kazuhiko Kishino, actor and voice-actor
- Kazuhiko Kurata (蔵田 和彦; born 1967), Japanese rower
- Kazuhiko Matsumoto, adult video director
- Kazuhiko Nishi 1980s Vice President of Microsoft's Far East operations
- Kazuhiko Nishijima (1926 – 2009) particle physicist
- Kazuhiko Ōigawa (大井川 和彦; born 1964), Japanese politician
- Kazuhiko Shimamoto, Manga artist
- Kazuhiko Shingyoji, footballer, Blaublitz Akita (previously called TDK S.C.)
- Kazuhiko Sugawara, speed skater
- Kazuhiko Tabuchi, Olympic fencer
- Kazuhiko Tokuno, Judo champion
- Kazuhiko Toyama composer of music for manga
- Kazuhiko Ushijima (牛島 和彦; born 1961), Japanese baseball player
- Kazuhiko Wakasugi, fencer
- Kazuhiko Yamaguchi, film director

== Fictional characters ==
- Kazuhiko Akiyama, a character in Sasuke
- Kazuhiko Nukumizu, a main character in the light novel/manga and anime Too Many Losing Heroines!
- Kazuhiko Yamamoto, a character in the novel Battle Royale - see List of Battle Royale characters

== See also ==
- 26170 Kazuhiko, a main belt asteroid
