= Guaíra, São Paulo =

Guaíra
- Municipality
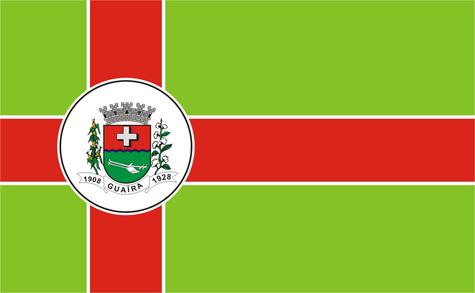
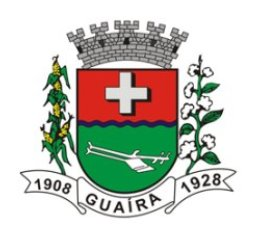
- Flag Coat of arms

- Location in São Paulo state

- Location in Brazil
- Coordinates: 20°19′6″S 48°18′38″W
- Country: Brazil
- Region: Southeast
- State: São Paulo
- Mesoregion: Ribeirão Preto

Government
  - Mayor: Sérgio de Mello (PT)

Area
  - Total: 1,258 km^{2} (486 sq mi)
- Elevation: 517 m (1,696 ft)

Population (2020)
  - Total: 41,040
  - Density: 32.62/km^{2} (84.49/sq mi)
- Time zone: UTC−3 (BRT)
- Postal code: 14790-000
- Area code: (+55) 17
- Website: www.guaira.sp.gov.br

Guaíra is a municipality in São Paulo state in Brazil. The population is 41,040 (2020 est.) in an area of 1258 km^{2}.

== History ==
In the northeastern region of São Paulo, between the Rio Grande, Pardo River and the Sapucaí River, in what was then called Nuporanga, Antônio Marques Garcia founded a town in the called "Corredeira," along the path to Santa dos Olhos D'Água (which is today known as Ipuã). A plot of land which was acquired November 12, 1901 for "Six-hundred thousand réis" was enlarged with lands donated by Joaquim Garcia Franco and Maria Sabino Alves Franco, resulting in a significantly sized area focused around a small settlement called "Corredeira of São Sebastião" in homage to the patron saint, later renamed "Corredeira do Bom Jardim" or simply "Corredeira."

It was named a "Distrito de Paz," (that is, was assigned a Justice of the Peace) with the name of Guaíra, by State Law n. 1144 on November 16, 1908, and a municipality by State Law n. 2328 on December 27, 1928. Installation as a municipality took place on May 18, 1929, and installation as a comarca on May 18, 1955. "Guaíra" is a toponym which can be translated as "running water."

- Patron Saint: Saint Sebastian

== Geography ==
Guaíra is located at an altitude of 517 metres (1,696 ft).

- Topography: flat
- Rainfall: yearly average of 1,550 mm
- Winds predominantly from the Northwest
- Temperature:
  - Maximum: 38 degrees Celsius
  - Minimum: 6 degrees Celsius
  - Median: 25 degrees Celsius

=== Hydrography ===
- Rio Grande
- Sapucaí River
- Rio Pardo
- Ribeirão do Jardim

=== Highways ===
- SP-345
- SP-425

== Demographics ==
Census data: 2000

Total population: 34,610

- Urban: 32.274
- Rural: 2,336
- Men: 17,412
- Women: 17, 198

Population density (inhabitants/km^{2}): 27.50

Infant mortality to age 1 (per thousand): 8.24

Life expectancy (years): 75.93

Fertility rate (children per woman): 2.17

Literacy rate: 91.07%

Human Development Index: 0.822

- HDI-M GDP: 0.728
- HDI-M Life Expectancy: 0.849
- HDI-M Education: 0.888

(Source: IPEA)

=== Other measures ===
- Number of voters in 2003: 25,231
- Date of founding: December 27, 1928
- Major industries: agriculture, husbandry, agribusiness
- Roads - 740 km
- Paved roads: 44 km
- Main tourist point: Lago Maracá

== Religion ==
Christianity is present in the city as follows:

=== Catholic Church ===
The Catholic church in the municipality is part of the Roman Catholic Diocese of Barretos.

=== Protestant Church ===
The most diverse evangelical beliefs are present in the city, mainly Pentecostal, including the Assemblies of God in Brazil (the largest evangelical church in the country), Christian Congregation in Brazil, among others. These denominations are growing more and more throughout Brazil.

== See also ==
- List of municipalities in São Paulo
