= Atsushi Matsuura =

Atsushi Matsuura may refer to:

- Atsushi Matsuura (musician) (born 1968), Japanese guitarist
- Atsushi Matsuura (footballer) (born 1982), Japanese footballer
