= President Marcos =

President Marcos may refer to:

- Ferdinand Marcos (1917–1989), 10th president of the Philippines and father of Bongbong Marcos
- Bongbong Marcos (Ferdinand Marcos Jr.) (born 1957), 17th president of the Philippines and son of Ferdinand Marcos

== See also ==
- Marcos (disambiguation)
