= Shinobu (disambiguation) =

Shinobu may refer to:

- Shinobu, a unisex Japanese given name.
- Shinobu (band), an American indie rock band
- Mount Shinobu, a mountain in the center of Fukushima, Fukushima, Japan
- Shinobu Sugawara, a professional wrestler who goes by the ring name "Shinobu"

== See also ==
- Shinobi no Mono (忍びの者), is an alternative name for ninja
- Ninin Ga Shinobuden, a manga and anime series
