= Fransérgio =

Fransérgio may refer to:

- Fransérgio (footballer, born 1980), Fransérgio Bastos, Brazilian football midfielder
- Fransérgio (footballer, born 1990), Fransérgio Barbosa, Brazilian football midfielder
- Francisco Sérgio García (born 1948), or Fransérgio, Brazilian basketball player
