= Wakasugi =

Wakasugi (written: 若杉) is a Japanese surname. Notable people with the surname include:

- Hiroshi Wakasugi (若杉 弘; 1935–2009), Japanese orchestra conductor
- Kazuhiko Wakasugi (若杉 和彦; born 1947), Japanese fencer
- Koki Wakasugi (若杉 好輝; born 1995), Japanese footballer
- Takashi Wakasugi (若杉 昂志; born 1990), Japanese-Australian comedian
