= Go Kaburaki =

Japanese footballer

Go Kaburaki 鏑木 豪
Personal information
- Full name: Go Kaburaki
- Date of birth: August 26, 1977 (age 49)
- Place of birth: Shinagawa, Tokyo, Japan
- Height: 1.90 m (6 ft 3 in)
- Position: Goalkeeper

Youth career
- 1993–1995: Tokyo Institute of Technology High School
- 1996–1998: Kokushikan University

Senior career*
Years	Team	Apps	(Gls)
1999–2000	Yokohama F. Marinos	0	(0)
1999	→Júbilo Iwata (loan)	0	(0)
2001	FC Tokyo	0	(0)
2002	Vissel Kobe	0	(0)
2002	Avispa Fukuoka	0	(0)
2003–2004	Mito HollyHock	16	(0)
2005–2006	Arte Takasaki	50	(0)
2006–2012	Tonan Maebashi		
Total		66	(0)
Medal record
Yokohama F. Marinos
Runner-up	J1 League	2000
Júbilo Iwata
Winner	J1 League	1999
- * Club domestic league appearances and goals

Go Kaburaki (鏑木 豪, Kaburaki Gō; born August 26, 1977) is a former Japanese football player.

== Playing career ==
Kaburaki was born in Shinagawa, Tokyo on August 26, 1977. In 1999, when he was Kokushikan University student, he joined J1 League club Yokohama F. Marinos. In June 1999, he moved to Júbilo Iwata 3 months on loan. In 2001, he moved to FC Tokyo. In 2002, he moved to Vissel Kobe. In March 2002, he moved to J2 League club Avispa Fukuoka. However he could not play at all in the match in these clubs until 2002. In 2003, he moved to J2 club Mito HollyHock. He played many matches as regular goalkeeper until May 2003. However he could hardly play in the match behind Koji Homma from May. In 2005, he moved to Japan Football League club FC Horikoshi (later Arte Takasaki). He played as regular goalkeeper in 2 seasons. In August 2006, he moved to Prefectural Leagues club Tonan SC (later Tonan Maebashi). The club was promoted to Regional Leagues from 2009. He played for top team until 2012 season.

== Club statistics ==
Club performance			League		Cup		League Cup		Total	
Season	Club	League	Apps	Goals	Apps	Goals	Apps	Goals	Apps	Goals
Japan			League		Emperor's Cup		J.League Cup		Total	
1999	Yokohama F. Marinos	J1 League	0	0	0	0	0	0	0	0
1999	Júbilo Iwata	J1 League	0	0	0	0	0	0	0	0
2000	Yokohama F. Marinos	J1 League	0	0	0	0	0	0	0	0
2001	FC Tokyo	J1 League	0	0	0	0	0	0	0	0
2002	Vissel Kobe	J1 League	0	0	0	0	0	0	0	0
2002	Avispa Fukuoka	J2 League	0	0	0	0	-		0	0
2003	Mito HollyHock	J2 League	13	0	0	0	-		13	0
2004	Mito HollyHock	J2 League	3	0	0	0	-		3	0
Total			16	0	0	0	0	0	16	0
