= Kosuke Suda =

Japanese footballer

Kosuke Suda 須田 興輔
Personal information
- Full name: Kosuke Suda
- Date of birth: February 4, 1980 (age 46)
- Place of birth: Koga, Ibaraki, Japan
- Height: 1.76 m (5 ft 9 1/2 in)
- Position: Defender

Youth career
- Bunan High School
- Nippon Sport Science University

Senior career*
Years	Team	Apps	(Gls)
2004–2005	Mito HollyHock	59	(4)
2006	Shonan Bellmare	18	(0)
2007	Tonan SC Gunma	4	(1)
2007	Montedio Yamagata	19	(0)
Total		100	(5)
- * Club domestic league appearances and goals

Kosuke Suda (須田 興輔, Suda Kosuke; born February 4, 1980) is a former Japanese football player.

== Club statistics ==
Club performance			League		Cup		Total	
Season	Club	League	Apps	Goals	Apps	Goals	Apps	Goals
Japan			League		Emperor's Cup		Total	
2004	Mito HollyHock	J2 League	21	0	0	0	21	0
2005	Mito HollyHock	J2 League	38	4	2	1	40	5
2006	Shonan Bellmare	J2 League	18	0	0	0	18	0
2007	Tonan SC Gunma	Prefectural Leagues	4	1	-		4	1
2007	Montedio Yamagata	J2 League	19	0	0	0	19	0
Total			100	5	2	1	102	6
