= Oliveira (footballer, born 1981) =

Brazilian footballer

Personal information
- Full name: Ederaldo Antonio de Oliveira
- Date of birth: 17 October 1981 (age 45)
- Place of birth: Carlópolis, Brazil
- Height: 1.89 m (6 ft 2 in)
- Position: Goalkeeper

Team information
- Current team: Desportivo Brasil

Youth career
- 2000: PSTC

Senior career*
Years	Team	Apps	(Gls)
2001–2003	PSTC		
2004–2007	Grêmio Barueri		
2007–2009	Roma–PR		
2007–2008	→ Toledo (loan)		
2008	→ Inter–SM (loan)		
2008	→ Foz do Iguaçu (loan)		
2009	→ São Luiz (loan)	11	(0)
2010	São Luiz	16	(0)
2010–2011	Pelotas	5	(0)
2011	Linense	0	(0)
2011	Cianorte	1	(0)
2012	Toledo	20	(0)
2012	Cascavel CR		
2012	São Carlos		
2013	São Luiz	19	(0)
2013–2015	Joinville	39	(0)
2016	→ Linense (loan)	17	(0)
2016	Joinville	11	(0)
2017	Novorizontino	11	(0)
2017	Ituano	6	(0)
2017	Juventude	4	(0)
2018–2020	Novorizontino	47	(0)
2021	Água Santa	19	(0)
2021–2022	São Bernardo FC	2	(0)
2022–2023	Desportivo Brasil	30	(1)
2023	XV de Piracicaba	12	(0)
2024–	Desportivo Brasil		
- * Club domestic league appearances and goals as of 26 July 2024

Ederaldo Antonio de Oliveira (born 17 October 1981), simply known as Oliveira, is a Brazilian footballer who plays as a goalkeeper for Desportivo Brasil.

On 6 August 2022, Oliveira scored a goal from a penalty kick.

== Honours ==
Joinville

- Campeonato Brasileiro Série B: 2014

São Bernardo FC

- Copa Paulista: 2021

== See also ==
- List of goalscoring goalkeepers
