= Marquinho (footballer, born 1976) =

Brazilian footballer

Personal information
- Full name: Marcos Bonifacio da Rocha
- Date of birth: 7 March 1976 (age 50)
- Place of birth: Brazil
- Height: 1.85 m (6 ft 1 in)
- Position: Midfielder

Senior career*
| Years | Team | Apps | (Gls) |
| 1993–1996 | Matsubara | | |
| 1997–1998 | Montedio Yamagata | | |
| 1999–2000 | Matsubara | | |
| 2001 | Albirex Niigata | | |
| 2002 | Kawasaki Frontale | | |
| 2003 | União Agrícola Barbarense | | |
| 2004 | Internacional-Limeira | | |
| 2004–2006 | Mito HollyHock | | |
| 2007–2010 | Tonan Maebashi | | |
- * Club domestic league appearances and goals

Marcos Bonifacio da Rocha (born 7 March 1976) is a Brazilian football player. He plays for Tonan Maebashi.

== Club statistics ==
| Club performance | | | League | | Cup | | League Cup | | Total | |
| Season | Club | League | Apps | Goals | Apps | Goals | Apps | Goals | Apps | Goals |
| Japan | | | League | | Emperor's Cup | | J.League Cup | | Total | |
|---|---|---|---|---|---|---|---|---|---|---|
| 1997 | Montedio Yamagata | Football League | 26 | 8 | 0 | 0 | - | | 26 | 8 |
| 1998 | Montedio Yamagata | Football League | 28 | 3 | 0 | 0 | - | | 28 | 3 |
| 2001 | Albirex Niigata | J2 League | 26 | 1 | 2 | 0 | 0 | 0 | 28 | 1 |
| 2002 | Kawasaki Frontale | J2 League | 26 | 4 | 3 | 0 | - | | 29 | 4 |
| 2004 | Mito HollyHock | J2 League | 19 | 1 | 1 | 0 | - | | 20 | 1 |
| 2005 | Mito HollyHock | J2 League | 19 | 0 | 0 | 0 | - | | 19 | 0 |
| 2006 | Mito HollyHock | J2 League | 21 | 0 | 1 | 0 | - | | 22 | 0 |
| 2007 | Tonan SC Gunma | Prefectural Leagues | | | 1 | 0 | - | | 1 | 0 |
| 2008 | Tonan Maebashi | Prefectural Leagues | | | - | | - | | | |
| 2009 | Tonan Maebashi | Regional Leagues | 13 | 1 | - | | - | | 13 | 1 |
| 2010 | Tonan Maebashi | Regional Leagues | 10 | 1 | - | | - | | 10 | 1 |
| Career total | | | 188 | 19 | 8 | 0 | 0 | 0 | 196 | 19 |
