= Lenílson (footballer, born 1983) =

Brazilian footballer

Personal information
- Full name: Lenílson Porto Peixoto
- Date of birth: October 9, 1983 (age 43)
- Place of birth: Colinas, Brazil
- Height: 1.72 m (5 ft 8 in)
- Position: Midfielder

Senior career*
Years	Team	Apps	(Gls)
2005	América-SP		
2006	CRB		
2007	Moto Club		
2008	Remo		
2008	Hermann Aichinger		
2008	Grêmio Prudente		
2009	América-RN		
2009	América-RJ	7	(0)
2010	Hermann Aichinger	1	(0)
2010–2011	Al Arabi Kuwait	4	(0)
2011	Brusque	9	(1)
2011	Cianorte	7	(0)
2012	Central	17	(3)
2012	Esportivo	?	(?)
2013	Guarani de Juazeiro	12	(1)
2013–2014	Passo Fundo	14	(2)
2014	São Luiz		
2014	Caxias	6	(0)
2015	União Frederiquense	7	(3)
2015–2016	Lajeadense	11	(1)
2016	Moto Club MA	0	(0)
2016	Uberlândia	1	(0)
2017	Brasil de Pelotas	0	(0)
2018	Glória		
2019–	União Frederiquense		
- * Club domestic league appearances and goals as of 12:09, 3 June 2019 (UTC)

Lenílson Porto Peixoto, shortly Lenílson (born October 9, 1983) is a Brazilian footballer who plays as a midfielder.
