= Shinobu =

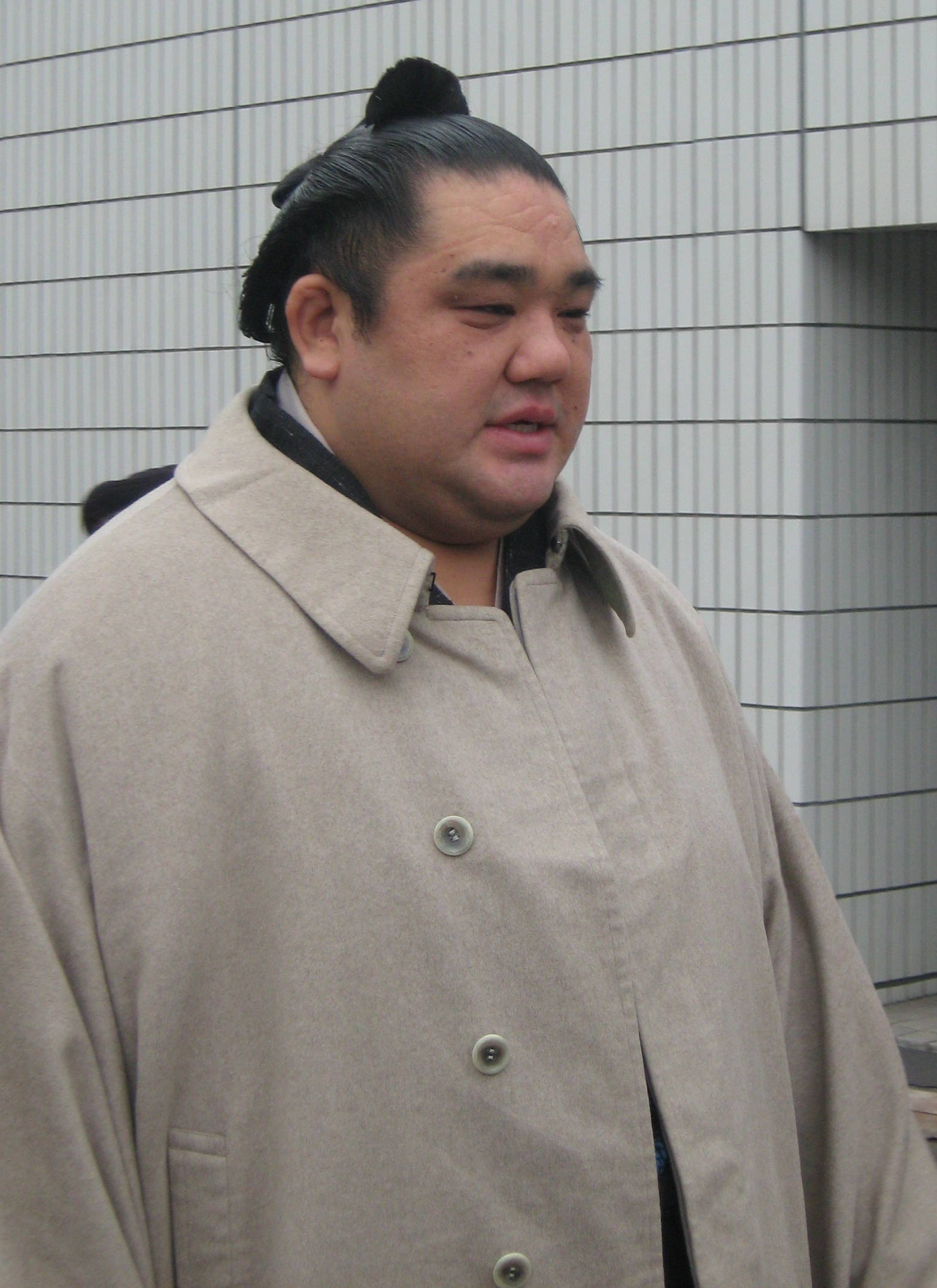
- Shinobu Wakanosato, a sumo wrestler
- Pronunciation: Shí-no-b(ú)
- Gender: Both

Origin
- Origin: Japanese
- Meaning: different meanings depending on the kanji

Other names
- Related names: Shino

Shinobu (しのぶ) is a Japanese verb meaning "recall" (偲ぶ) or "stealth/endure" (忍ぶ). It is a Japanese given name used by either gender. Shinobu is also the dictionary form of shinobi, which can be combined with mono (者) to make shinobi no mono (忍びの者), an alternative name of ninja.

== Written forms ==
Shinobu can be written using different kanji characters and can mean:

as a given name

- 忍, "endurance/perseverance/patience"
- 清信, "purify, belief"
- 志信, "intention, belief"

as a male given name

- 信夫, "belief, man"

The name can also be written in hiragana or katakana, though hiragana is typically reserved for females and katakana for foreign-born Japanese.

== People ==
- Shinobu Adachi (忍, born 1958), Japanese voice actress and actress
- Shinobu Asagoe (しのぶ, born 1976), Japanese professional tennis player
- Shinobu Fukuhara (忍, born 1976), Japanese baseball pitcher
- Shinobu Hashimoto (忍, 1918-2018), Japanese screenwriter, director, and producer
- Shinobu "Inoran" Inoue (清信, born 1970), Japanese rock musician
- Shinobu Ishihara (忍, 1879–1963), Japanese ophthalmologist
- Shinobu Iwane, professional shogi player
- Shinobu Ito (footballer) (born 1983), former Japanese football player
- Shinobu Kandori (忍, born 1964), Japanese female wrestler and politician
- Shinobu Muraki (1923–1997), Japanese production designer and art director
- Shinobu Nakayama (忍, born 1973), Japanese actress and a former J-pop singer
- Shinobu Ohno (忍, born 1984), Japanese female football player
- Shinobu Ohtaka (忍), Japanese manga artist
- Shinobu Orikuchi (信夫, 1887–1953), Japanese ethnologist, linguist, folklorist, novelist, and poet
- Shinobu Otake (しのぶ, born 1957), Japanese actress
- Shinobu Otowa (しのぶ, born 1977), Japanese enka singer
- Shinobu Sato (born 1955), Japanese classical artist
- Shinobu Satouchi (信夫), Japanese voice actor
- Shinobu Sekine (忍, 1943–2018), Japanese judoka
- Shinobu Tanno (忍, born 1973), Japanese illustrator
- Shinobu Tsukasa (忍, born 1942), Japanese yakuza overlord
- Shinobu Yaguchi (史靖, born 1967), Japanese film director and screenwriter
- Shinobu Sugawara, (菅原 忍, born 1980, Japanese professional wrestler)
- Shinobu Wakanosato (忍, born 1976), Japanese professional sumo wrestler
- Shinobu Kaitani (born 1967), manga artist and a recipient of the 1991 Tezuka Award
- Shinobu Kitamoto (born 1977), Japanese sprint canoer
- Shinobu Terajima (born 1972), Japanese actress
- Shinobu Ikeda (born 1962), Japanese footballer

== Characters ==
- Shinobu (忍), a ninja trainee in "2x2 Shinobuden", aka Ninja Nonsense
- Shinobu, a chinchilla on the animated sitcom Bob's Burgers
- Shinobu Handa, a character in the anime and manga series Shōjo Sect
- Shinobu Ijūin (忍), a character in the manga and anime series Haikara-san ga Tōru
- Shinobu Inuyose, a character from the music media franchise D4DJ
- Shinobu Jacobs (シノブ), a character in the video game No More Heroes
- Shinobu Kagurazaka (忍), a character in the manga and anime series Tenjho Tenge
- Shinobu Maehara (しのぶ), a character in the manga and anime series Love Hina
- Shinobu Miyake (しのぶ), a character in the manga and anime series Urusei Yatsura
- Shinobu Morita (忍), a character in the manga, anime, and TV drama series Honey and Clover
- Shinobu Kamiki (上喜しのぶ) a character in the Mobile Games and anime series Princess Connect! Re:Dive
- Shinobu Kawajiri (しのぶ), a minor character in the manga and anime series Diamond is Unbreakable.
- Shinobu Kocho (しのぶ), a supporting character in the manga and anime series Demon Slayer: Kimetsu no Yaiba.
- Shinobu Oshino (忍), a character in the light novel and anime series Monogatari
- Shinobu Sarutobi, a character from the light novel series High School Prodigies Have It Easy Even in Another World
- Shinobu Sengoku, a character from the game franchise Ensemble Stars!
- Shinobu Sensui (忍), a character from the anime and manga series YuYu Hakusho
- Shinobu Takeda, a fictional character that appears in the comic book series W.I.T.C.H.
- Shinobu Takatsuki, a character in the anime and manga series Junjo Romantica
- Shinobu Fujiwara (藤原忍), a character in the anime series Dancouga – Super Beast Machine God
- Captain Shinobu Nagumo, a character in Mobile Police Patlabor
- Kuki Shinobu, a character in 2020 video game Genshin Impact
