= Cianorte Futebol Clube =

Association football club

Cianorte
- Full name: Cianorte Futebol Clube
- Nickname: Leão do Vale do Ivaí (Ivaí Valley's Lion)
- Founded: 13 February 2002 (24 years ago)
- Ground: Estádio Olimpico Albino Turbay
- Capacity: 5.000
- President: Marcos Franzato
- Head coach: Bolívar
- League: Campeonato Brasileiro Série D Campeonato Paranaense
- 2025 2025: Série D, 7th of 64; Paranaense, 6th of 12
Home colours	Away colours

Cianorte Futebol Clube, more commonly referred to as Cianorte, is a Brazilian professional association football club in Cianorte, Paraná which currently plays in Campeonato Brasileiro Série D, the fourth tier of Brazilian football, as well as the Campeonato Paranaense, the top division of the Paraná state football league.

== History ==
The club was founded on February 13, 2002, replacing a defunct club named Cianorte Esporte Clube.

Cianorte was eliminated in the first stage of Campeonato Brasileiro Série C in 2005, and in the second round of 2005 Copa do Brasil.

== Honours ==
State
Competitions	Titles	Seasons
Copa Paraná	1	2025
Campeonato Paranaense Série Prata	1	2016

=== Others ===
- Campeonato Paranaense do Interior (2): 2004, 2011

=== Runners-up ===
- Copa Paraná (1): 2008
- Campeonato Paranaense Série Prata (1): 2003

== Current squad ==
Note: Flags indicate national team as defined under FIFA eligibility rules; some limited exceptions apply. Players may hold more than one non-FIFA nationality.

No.	Pos.	Nation	Player
—	GK	BRA	Marcelo
—	GK	BRA	Oliveira
—	DF	BRA	Elvis
—	DF	BRA	Valdir
—	DF	BRA	Xandi
—	DF	BRA	Fabinho
—	DF	BRA	Ligger
—	DF	BRA	Bruno Matavelli
—	MF	BRA	Cleitão
—	MF	BRA	Emerson Bala
—	MF	BRA	Felipe Pinto
—	MF	BRA	Viera Joseph

No.	Pos.	Nation	Player
—	MF	BRA	José Célio
—	MF	BRA	Maikon Willian
—	MF	BRA	Lenílson
—	MF	BRA	Jovany
—	MF	BRA	Valmir
—	FW	BRA	Marquinhos
—	FW	BRA	Thiago Santos
—	FW	BRA	William Martins
—	FW	BAN	Asif Abdullah
—	FW	BRA	Vágner Carioca
—	FW	BRA	Warlley
—	DF	BAN	Nazmul Hossain Akondo
