= Yasutaka Kobayashi =

Japanese footballer

Yasutaka Kobayashi 小林 康剛
Personal information
- Full name: Yasutaka Kobayashi
- Date of birth: June 15, 1980 (age 46)
- Place of birth: Tokai, Ibaraki, Japan
- Height: 1.83 m (6 ft 0 in)
- Position: Forward

Youth career
- 1996–1998: Kashima Antlers

Senior career*
Years	Team	Apps	(Gls)
1999–2001	Kashima Antlers	1	(0)
2000	→Vegalta Sendai (loan)	37	(6)
2002–2003	Kawasaki Frontale	16	(3)
2004	Mito HollyHock	40	(9)
2005–2007	Tokushima Vortis	108	(20)
2008–2009	Fagiano Okayama	38	(19)
2010–2014	Fukushima United FC	68	(34)
Total		308	(91)
Medal record
Kashima Antlers
Winner	J1 League	2001
Runner-up	J.League Cup	1999
- * Club domestic league appearances and goals

Yasutaka Kobayashi (小林 康剛, Kobayashi Yasutaka; born June 15, 1980) is a former Japanese football player.

== Playing career ==
Kobayashi was born in Tokai, Ibaraki on June 15, 1980. He joined the J1 League club Kashima Antlers youth team in 1999. However he was never put into play. In 2000, he moved to the J2 League club Vegalta Sendai on loan. He played often as forward. In 2001, he returned to the Kashima Antlers. However he did not play much. In 2002, he moved to the J2 club Kawasaki Frontale. Although he was there for two seasons, he did not play much. In 2004, he moved to Mito HollyHock. Although he was a regular player, he did not play much in late 2004. In 2005, he moved to the newly promoted J2 League club, Tokushima Vortis. He played many matches over three seasons. In 2008, he moved to the Japan Football League (JFL) club Fagiano Okayama. He was a regular player and scored 19 goals. The club was also promoted to J2 in 2009. However he did not play as much in 20099. In 2010, he moved to the Regional Leagues club Fukushima United FC. He was in many matches and the club was promoted to the JFL in 2013 and the J3 League in 2014. He retired at the end of the 2014 season.

== Club statistics ==
Club performance			League		Cup		League Cup		Total	
Season	Club	League	Apps	Goals	Apps	Goals	Apps	Goals	Apps	Goals
Japan			League		Emperor's Cup		J.League Cup		Total	
1999	Kashima Antlers	J1 League	0	0	0	0	0	0	0	0
2000	Vegalta Sendai	J2 League	37	6	0	0	2	0	39	6
2001	Kashima Antlers	J1 League	1	0	0	0	0	0	1	0
2002	Kawasaki Frontale	J2 League	6	2	4	2	-		10	4
2003	Kawasaki Frontale	J2 League	10	1	4	0	-		14	1
2004	Mito HollyHock	J2 League	40	9	0	0	-		40	9
2005	Tokushima Vortis	J2 League	38	11	2	2	-		40	13
2006	Tokushima Vortis	J2 League	32	8	2	1	-		34	9
2007	Tokushima Vortis	J2 League	38	1	2	1	-		40	2
2008	Fagiano Okayama	Football League	31	19	0	0	-		31	19
2009	Fagiano Okayama	J2 League	7	0	0	0	-		7	0
2010	Fukushima United FC	Regional Leagues	10	5	0	0	-		10	5
2011	Fukushima United FC	Regional Leagues	10	11	1	0	-		11	11
2012	Fukushima United FC	Regional Leagues	10	12	1	0	-		11	12
2013	Fukushima United FC	Football League	15	4	0	0	-		15	4
2014	Fukushima United FC	J3 League	23	2	0	0	-		23	2
Total			308	91	16	6	2	0	326	97
