= Don Mariano Marcos Memorial State University =

Public university in La Union, Philippines

- Pang-alaalang Pamantasang Pampamahalaang Don Mariano Marcos (Filipino)
- Type: State University
- Established: January 15, 1981; 45 years ago
- President: Dr. Jaime I. Manuel, Jr
- Students: ~49,184
- Location: Bacnotan, La Union, Philippines; 16°43′31″N 120°23′32″E
- Campus: North La Union Campus (Bacnotan) 100 hectares (1,000,000 m^{2}); Mid La Union Campus (San Fernando) 5.75 hectares (57,500 m^{2}); South La Union Campus (Agoo) 15.5 hectares (155,000 m^{2})
- Website: dmmmsu.edu.ph
- Location in Luzon Location in the Philippines

Don Mariano Marcos Memorial State University (DMMMSU [ˈdimsʊ]; Filipino: Pang-alaalang Pamantasang Pampamahalaang Don Mariano Marcos) is the state university system serving the province of La Union in the Philippines. Its main autonomous unit is in Bacnotan. It was created by 10th president Ferdinand Marcos by using Presidential Decree 1778 to combine a number of state-run schools in La Union into a single state college in 1981. Like Mariano Marcos State University in Ilocos Norte, it is named for the former president's father, Mariano Marcos.

Before 1993, DMMMSU occupied seven campuses throughout the province. After a reorganization that year, these campuses were grouped into four autonomous units, simply called the North La Union Main Campus (DMMMSU-NLUC), the Mid La Union Campus (DMMMSU-MLUC), the South La Union Campus (DMMMSU-SLUC), and the Open University System (DMMMSU-OU). Each unit is headed by a chancellor/director, while the whole system is headed by the university president Dr. Jaime I. Manuel Jr.

== North La Union Campus ==
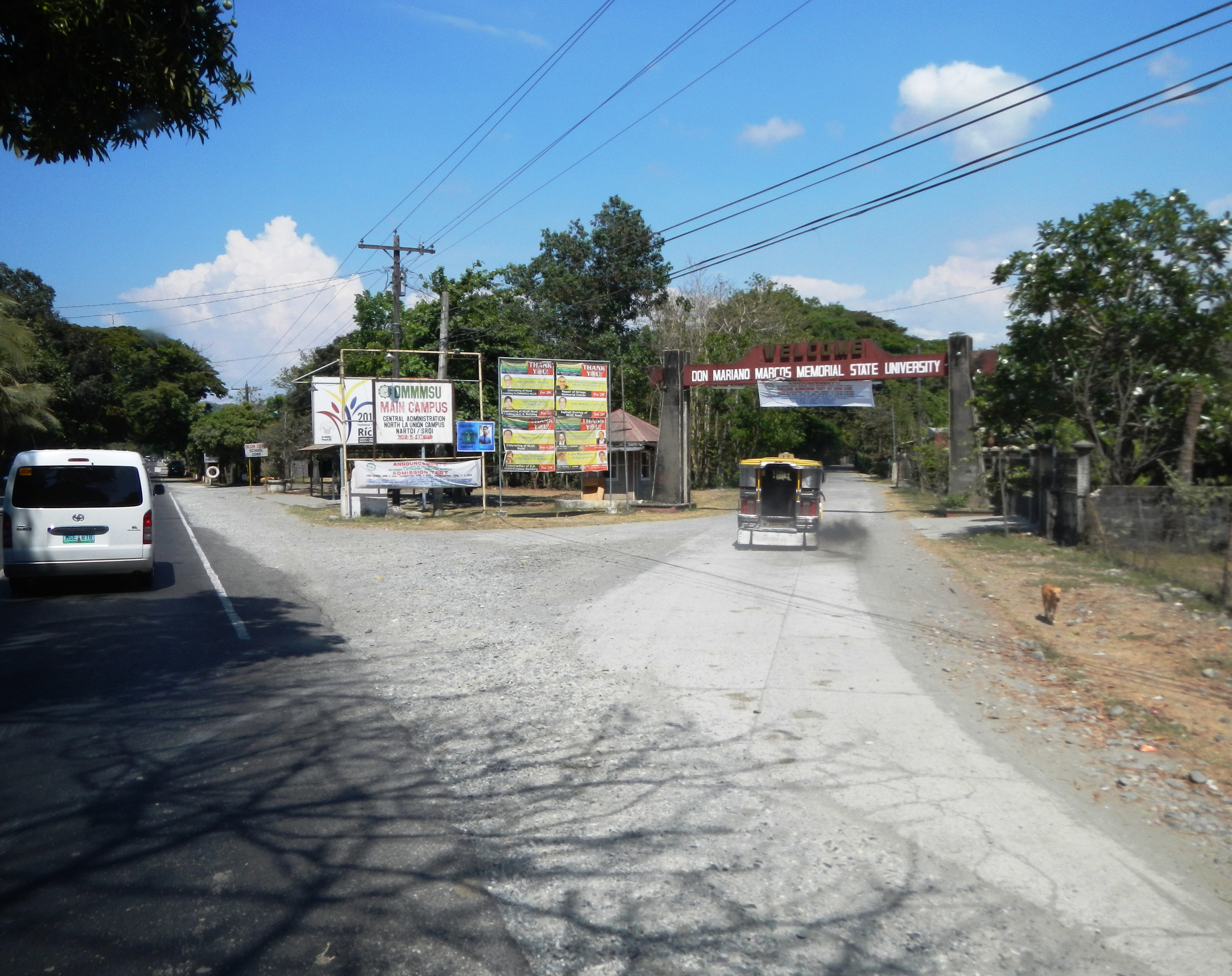
Main Campus in Bacnotan

The North La Union campus serves the seat of DMMMSU's central administration and was created in 1993 out of what were then the College of Agriculture and Forestry (CAF), Institute of Veterinary Medicine (IVM), Institute of Computer Studies (ICS), and Institute of Environmental Studies (IES). The College of Fisheries Balaoan was also absorbed into NLUC and was made the Fisheries Research and Training Institute (FRTI).

In 2002, the College of Agriculture and Forestry was split into the College of Agriculture and the Institute of Agroforestry and Watershed Management (IAWM). The latter was formed by bringing together the agroforestry and forestry programs of the CAF.

The Bacnotan Campus of NLUC hosts two national research institutes: the Sericulture Research and Development Institute (SRDI) and the National Apiculture Research Training and Development Institute (NARTDI).

== Mid La Union Campus ==
San Fernando, La Union campus

La Union School of Arts and Trade was established in 1907 by D. Aran, an American, its founder and its first principal. It was one of the earliest vocational schools in the Philippines; it started as an intermediate school with only five teachers and 88 students. In 1917, Mr. Huncy, succeeded him until 1922. Secondary courses were then offered. The intermediate curriculum was eventually dropped in 1927 and, in 1928, the La Union Trade School was transferred to its present site and converted into the secondary level. It was the incumbency of the first Filipino principal, Catalino Calica, that the school turned out its first set of eight graduates. The school closed during the Second World War.

By virtue of R.A. 543 on 16 June 1950, the La Union Trade School was placed under the support of the national government. R.A. 801 was enacted on 21 June 1952 to convert the institution into a National Regional School of Arts and Trades known as the La Union School of Arts and Trades. Tranquilino de los Trinos was the first superintendent. In 1957, Apolinario Apilado took over as the second superintendent and, in 1957, Fermin Taruc became the third superintendent. Taruc's administration placed much emphasis in the improvement of the standard of instruction in all levels.

In 1975, Avelino Ascuncion assumed office as the fourth superintendent. The school served as a Regional Development Center for Practical Arts in Region I. The degree of Bachelor of Science in Industrial Technology was offered during the school year 1976–1977. The school accommodated the extension classes of UP Graduate School, Baguio City, for the degree of Master of Management. Likewise, the school was chosen by Engineering Equipment Inc. as its training center in northern Luzon where vocational graduates underwent further training in their fields.

On May 25, 1978, Hipolito Pacis took over as the fifth superintendent. The school was integrated into the Don Mariano Marcos Memorial State University on 15 January 1981 through P.D. 1778. Dr. Bienvenido Agpaoa became its first president. In 1989, Dr. Manuel Corpus was installed as the second president. In 1996, DMMMSU has been adjudged by the CHED (Commission on Higher Education) as number 7 among top universities and colleges (public and private) in the Philippines. On 23 July 1999, Dr. Dionisio Gat Ducusin became the third president of the university. The Mid-La Union Campus has Dr. Rodolfo R. Apigo as its chancellor, assuming the position on 23 September 1999.

Dr. Ernesto R. Gapasin, former MLUC chancellor became the fourth president of the university.

== South La Union Campus ==
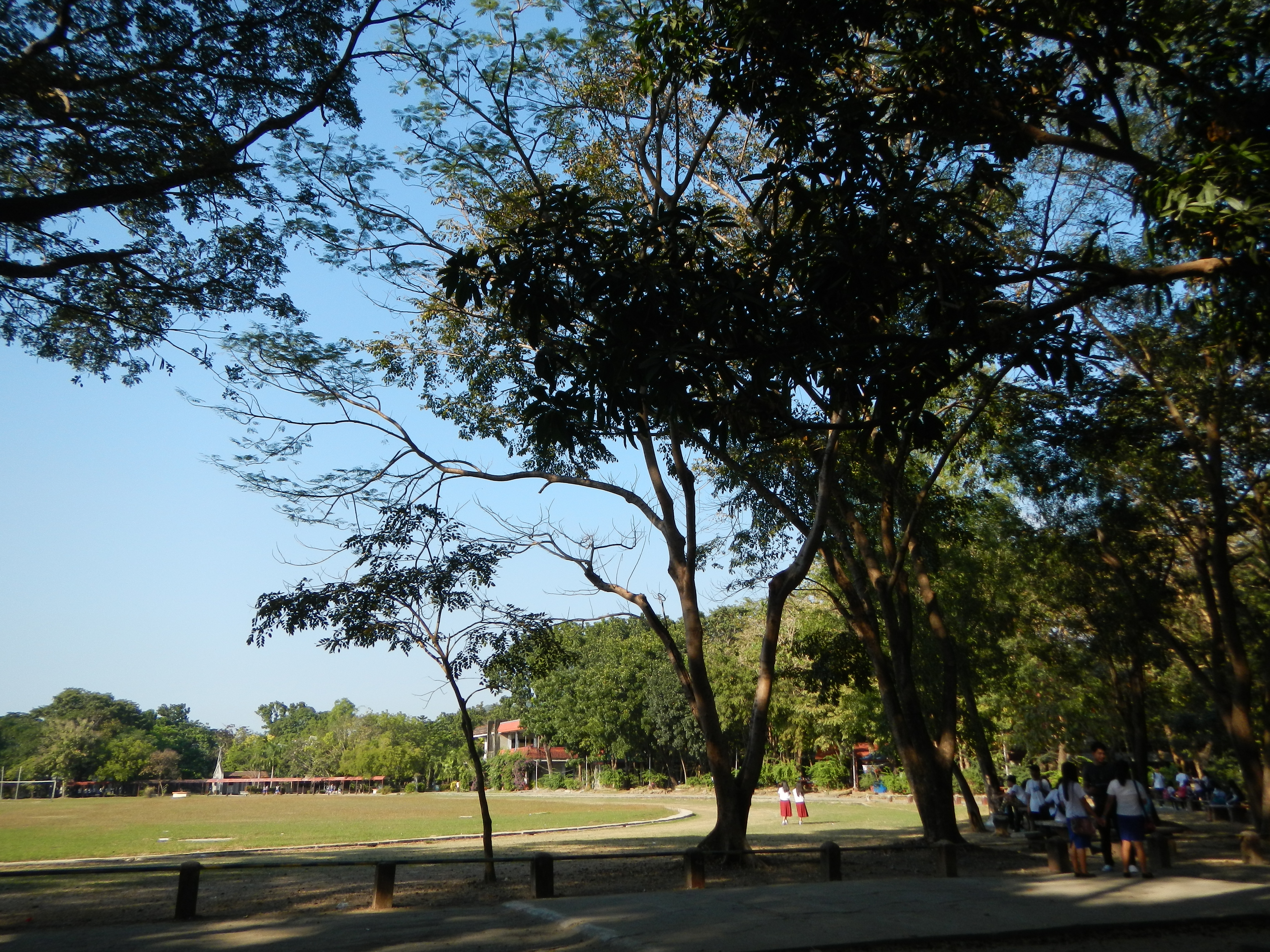
DMMMSU-South La Union Campus (Agoo, La Union)

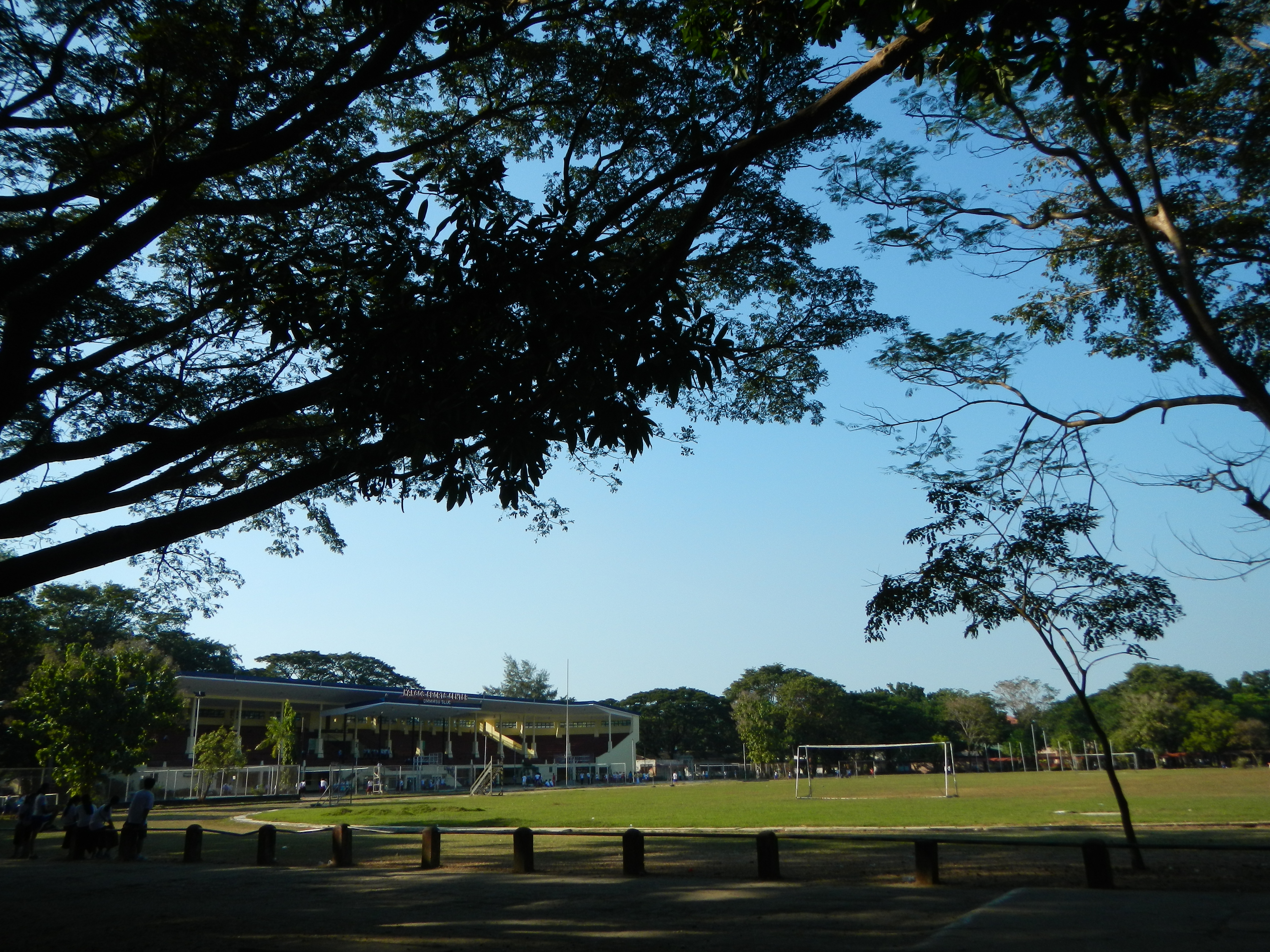
Don Mariano Marcos Memorial State University, (Marcos Sports Center)

The DMMMSU College of Arts and Sciences occupies a 15.5-hectare (38-acre) lot, consisting of several modern buildings, including a large library and an unfinished gymnasium.

In the mid-1940s a citizen, Ramon Mabutas, suggested establishing a public high school, leading Mayor Miguel Fontanilia and members of the Municipal Council to organize a committee to begin preparations for such a school. The committee included Dr. Manuel Cases, Atty. Bernardo Gapus, Atty. Mauro Ordoña, Atty. Telesforo Ofiana, Atty. Esperidion Ventura and Agaton Umanos. The South Provincial High School opened on July 23, 1945.

On February 15, 2024, President Bongbong Marcos signed Republic Act No. 11978, the “Don Mariano Marcos Memorial State University-South La Union Campus-College of Medicine” which offers a Doctor of Medicine Program, including an Integrated Liberal Arts and Medicine Program, the First medical school in La Union in Agoo.

== See also ==
- List of state schools, colleges and universities in the Philippines
- List of forestry universities and colleges
