= Jun Tanaka (footballer) =

Japanese footballer

Personal information
- Full name: Jun Tanaka
- Date of birth: September 1, 1983 (age 43)
- Place of birth: Saitama, Japan
- Height: 1.78 m (5 ft 10 in)
- Position: Defender

Youth career
- 2002–2005: Shobi University

Senior career*
Years	Team	Apps	(Gls)
2006–2011	Thespa Kusatsu	170	(4)
2013	Tonan Maebashi		
Total		170	(4)
- * Club domestic league appearances and goals

Jun Tanaka (田中 淳, Tanaka Jun; born September 1, 1983) is a former Japanese football player.

== Club statistics ==
Club performance			League		Cup		Total	
Season	Club	League	Apps	Goals	Apps	Goals	Apps	Goals
Japan			League		Emperor's Cup		Total	
2006	Thespa Kusatsu	J2 League	20	0	1	0	21	0
2007	Thespa Kusatsu	J2 League	27	0	1	0	28	0
2008	Thespa Kusatsu	J2 League	35	2	1	0	36	2
2009	Thespa Kusatsu	J2 League	43	2	2	0	45	2
2010	Thespa Kusatsu	J2 League	28	0	1	0	29	0
2011	Thespa Kusatsu	J2 League						
Country	Japan		153	4	6	0	159	4
Total			153	4	6	0	159	4
