= Takamichi Seki =

Japanese footballer

Takamichi Seki 関 隆倫
Personal information
- Full name: Takamichi Seki
- Date of birth: January 16, 1981 (age 45)
- Place of birth: Matsudo, Japan
- Height: 1.73 m (5 ft 8 in)
- Position: Midfielder

Youth career
- 1996–1998: Narashino High School
- 1999–2002: Toyo University

Senior career*
Years	Team	Apps	(Gls)
2003	Omiya Ardija	0	(0)
2004–2005	Mito HollyHock	80	(2)
2006–2007	Consadole Sapporo	29	(1)
2008	Tonan Maebashi		
2008	Fagiano Okayama	16	(0)
2009	Okinawa Kariyushi FC	14	(4)
2010	FC Ryukyu	12	(0)
Total		151	(7)
- * Club domestic league appearances and goals

Takamichi Seki (関 隆倫, Seki Takamichi; born January 16, 1981) is a former Japanese football player.

== Career statistics ==
Appearances and goals by club, season and competition
Club	Season	League			Emperor's Cup		Total	
Club	Season	Division	Apps	Goals	Apps	Goals	Apps	Goals
Omiya Ardija	2003	J2 League	0	0	0	0	0	0
Mito HollyHock	2004	J2 League	37	1	1	0	38	1
Mito HollyHock	2005	J2 League	43	1	2	2	45	3
Consadole Sapporo	2006	J2 League	29	1	1	0	30	1
Consadole Sapporo	2007	J2 League	0	0	1	0	1	0
Tonan Maebashi	2008	Prefectural Leagues			-			
Fagiano Okayama	2008	Football League	16	0	2	0	18	0
Okinawa Kariyushi FC	2009	Regional Leagues	14	4	2	0	16	4
FC Ryukyu	2010	Football League						
Career total			139	7	9	2	148	9
