= João Costa (footballer, born 1 March 2005) =

Brazilian footballer

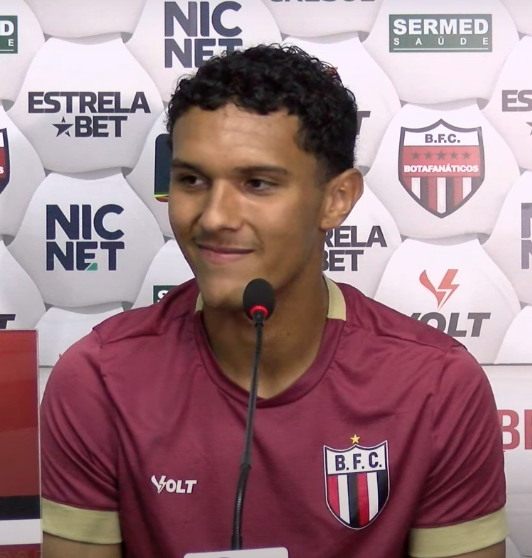
- João Costa in 2024

Personal information
- Full name: João Vitor Hipólito Costa
- Date of birth: 1 March 2005 (age 21)
- Place of birth: Franca, Brazil
- Position: Defensive midfielder

Team information
- Current team: Murcia (on loan from Botafogo-SP)

Youth career
- 2018: Francana
- 2019: Inter de Bebedouro
- 2019–2024: Botafogo-SP
- 2025–2026: → Fortaleza U20 (loan)

Senior career*
Years	Team	Apps	(Gls)
2022–	Botafogo-SP	34	(2)
2026–	→ Murcia (loan)	0	(0)
- * Club domestic league appearances and goals as of 15 January 2026

João Vitor Hipólito Costa (born 1 March 2005), known as João Costa, is a Brazilian footballer who plays as a defensive midfielder for Spanish Primera Federación club Murcia on loan from Botafogo-SP.

== Club career ==
Born in Franca, São Paulo, João Costa joined Botafogo-SP's youth sides in 2019, after representing Inter de Bebedouro and Francana. He made his senior debut in the 2022 Copa Paulista, as the squad was mainly composed of under-20 players.

After impressing with the under-20 squad in the 2024 Copa São Paulo de Futebol Júnior, João Costa was promoted to the main squad and started to feature regularly in the 2024 Série B under manager Paulo Gomes. He scored his first professional goal on 4 June 2024, netting his side's second in a 2–1 away win over Santos.

On 14 August 2024, João Costa renewed his contract with the Pantera until March 2027.

On 2 February 2026, was loaned by Spanish club Murcia in the third tier and was registered for the reserve squad Real Murcia Imperial.

== International career ==
On 20 September 2024, João Costa was called up to the Brazil national under-20 team for a period of trainings.

== Career statistics ==
As of 15 October 2024

Club	Season	League			State League		Cup		Continental		Other		Total	
Club	Season	Division	Apps	Goals	Apps	Goals	Apps	Goals	Apps	Goals	Apps	Goals	Apps	Goals
Botafogo-SP	2022	Série C	0	0	—		—		—		4 (Note: Appearance(s) in Copa Paulista)	0	4	0
Botafogo-SP	2023	Série B	0	0	0	0	0	0	—		—		0	0
Botafogo-SP	2024	Série B	26	2	0	0	2	0	—		1	0	29	2
Career total			26	2	0	0	2	0	0	0	5	0	33	2
