= Ribeirão Corrente =

- Municipality
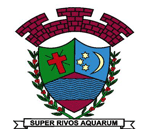
- Flag Coat of arms

- Location in São Paulo state

- Location in Brazil
- Coordinates: 20°27′25″S 47°35′25″W
- Country: Brazil
- Region: Southeast
- State: São Paulo

Area
  - Total: 148 km^{2} (57 sq mi)

Population (2020)
  - Total: 4,752
  - Density: 32.1/km^{2} (83.2/sq mi)
- Time zone: UTC−3 (BRT)

Ribeirão Corrente is a municipality in the state of São Paulo in Brazil. The population is 4,752 (2020 est.) in an area of 148 km^{2}. The elevation is 855 m.

== See also ==
- List of municipalities in São Paulo
