= Shinobu Ito =

Japanese footballer (born 1983)

Shinobu Ito 伊藤 仁
Personal information
- Full name: Shinobu Ito
- Date of birth: May 7, 1983 (age 43)
- Place of birth: Saitama, Japan
- Height: 1.76 m (5 ft 9 in)
- Position: Midfielder

Youth career
- 1999–2001: Bunan High School

Senior career*
Years	Team	Apps	(Gls)
2002–2003	Cerezo Osaka	2	(0)
2004–2005	Mito HollyHock	56	(1)
Total		58	(1)
Medal record
Cerezo Osaka
Runner-up	Emperor's Cup	2003
- * Club domestic league appearances and goals

Shinobu Ito (伊藤 仁, Itō Shinobu; born May 7, 1983) is a former Japanese football player.

== Playing career ==
Ito was born in Saitama Prefecture on May 7, 1983. After graduating from high school, he joined the J2 League club Cerezo Osaka in 2002. Cerezo won second place during the 2002 season and was promoted to the J1 League. In 2004, he moved to the J2 club Mito HollyHock. He became a regular player as a left side back soon afterward. However he lost his position in May and played as a substitute in May. Although he played often in 2005, he retired at the end of the 2005 season.

== Career statistics ==
Appearances and goals by club, season and competition
Club	Season	League			Emperor's Cup		J.League Cup		Total	
Club	Season	Division	Apps	Goals	Apps	Goals	Apps	Goals	Apps	Goals
Cerezo Osaka	2002	J2 League	0	0	0	0	—		0	0
Cerezo Osaka	2003	J1 League	2	0	0	0	3	0	5	0
Mito HollyHock	2004	J2 League	33	0			—		33	0
Mito HollyHock	2005	J2 League	23	1			—		23	1
Career total			58	1	0	0	3	0	61	1
