= Fransérgio (footballer, born 1980) =

Brazilian/Turkish footballer

Fransérgio (Ferhat Sergio)
Personal information
- Full name: Fransérgio Euripedes Ferreira Bastos
- Date of birth: 4 June 1980 (age 46)
- Place of birth: Franca, SP, Brazil
- Height: 1.84 m (6 ft 0 in)
- Position: Midfielder

Senior career*
Years	Team	Apps	(Gls)
?–2003	Figueirense		
2003–	Maccabi Herzliya		
–2005	Juventus (SP)		
2005–2007	Sivasspor	50	(4)
2007–2008	Kasımpaşa	21	(1)
2008–2009	Kocaelispor	7	(0)
- * Club domestic league appearances and goals

Fransérgio Euripedes Ferreira Bastos (born 4 June 1980 in Franca, Brazil), known by his mononym Fransérgio, is a Brazilian former professional footballer who played as a midfielder. He has Turkish dual citizenship under the name Ferhat Sergio.
