= Pacifico Marcos =

Filipino physician

- Born: Pacifico Edralin Marcos; January 30, 1919; Sarrat, Ilocos Norte, Philippine Islands, U.S.
- Died: January 10, 1998 (aged 78)
- Known for: Medical doctor
- Parent(s): Mariano Rubio Marcos; Josefa Edralin

Pacífico Edralin Marcos (January 30, 1919 – January 10, 1998) was a Filipino physician and known younger brother of former President of the Philippines Ferdinand E. Marcos.

== Life ==
Dr. Marcos was born in Sarrat, Ilocos Norte to Mariano Rubio Marcos and Josefa Quetulio Edralin. Marcos, a graduate of the University of the Philippines College of Medicine and a member of the Mu Sigma Phi, was a President of the Philippine Medical Association. In 1971 he was appointed the first chair of the nine-member Philippine Medical Care Commission. This commission was tasked to provide medical insurance to poor Filipinos. The commission's program ran for almost a quarter of a century. He was chair for 12 years. In the 1970s, Marcos headed a defense fund which supported two Filipina nurses accused of killing 10 patients in the Ann Arbor Hospital Murders. He called their conviction a "miscarriage of justice".

He owned, controlled, or had interests in 50 corporations, including a large car dealership, a sugar mill called Consolidate Sugar Corporation, a real estate firm called Citizens Development Inc, and Philippine Seed Inc.

Marcos did not involve himself in politics, and distanced himself from his brother's regime when it grew unpopular during the 1980s. In a 1986 interview he said he was unaware of the extent of his brother's wealth. He did not join the Marcos family in Hawaii after the EDSA Revolution, and opted to stay in the Philippines in retirement.

In 1998 Marcos was the subject of a lawsuit over an under-collateralized behest loan in the amount of ₱60 million which his company, Bagumbayan Corp, received from the Development Bank of the Philippines. It was one of a series of lawsuits over behest loans given to associates of President Marcos. The case was finally dismissed in 2007 by the Supreme Court, which said there was no evidence that the loan was given simply because Pacifico Marcos was a "crony" of the former president.

His son, Mariano "Nonong" Marcos II, who became a provincial board member in Ilocos Norte, died on February 15, 2019.

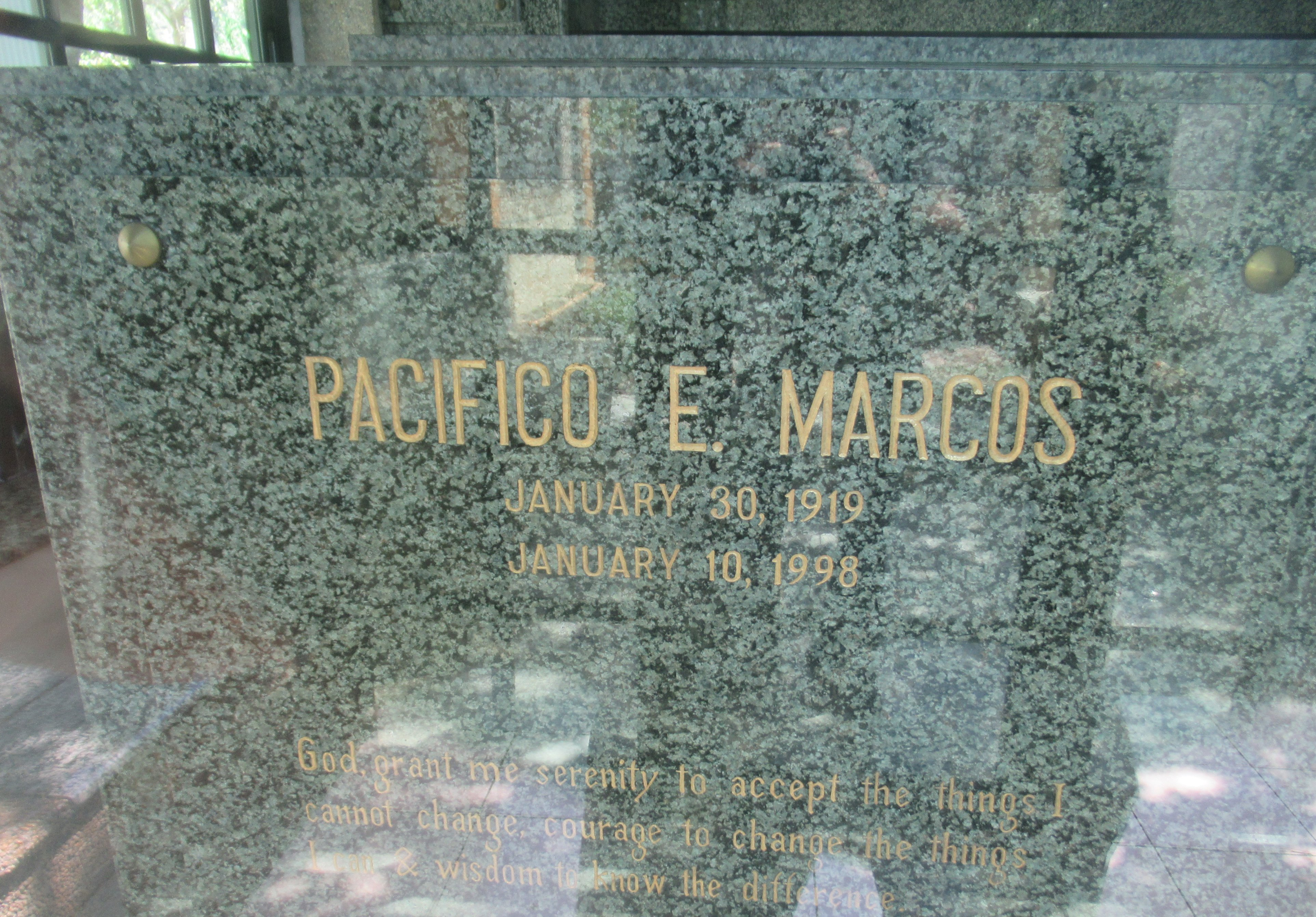
Marcos' grave at Manila Memorial Park – Sucat.

== Death ==
By 2017, news reports indicated that Fortuna Marcos-Barba, the youngest of the Marcos siblings, was the only member of that generation still alive. Reports from the February 2019 death of Pacifico's son Mariano Marcos II also reported that Pacifico had predeceased Mariano II.
