= Marquinho, Paraná =

Coordinates: 25°07′S 52°17′W

- Municipality
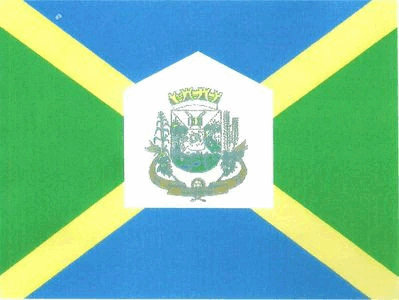
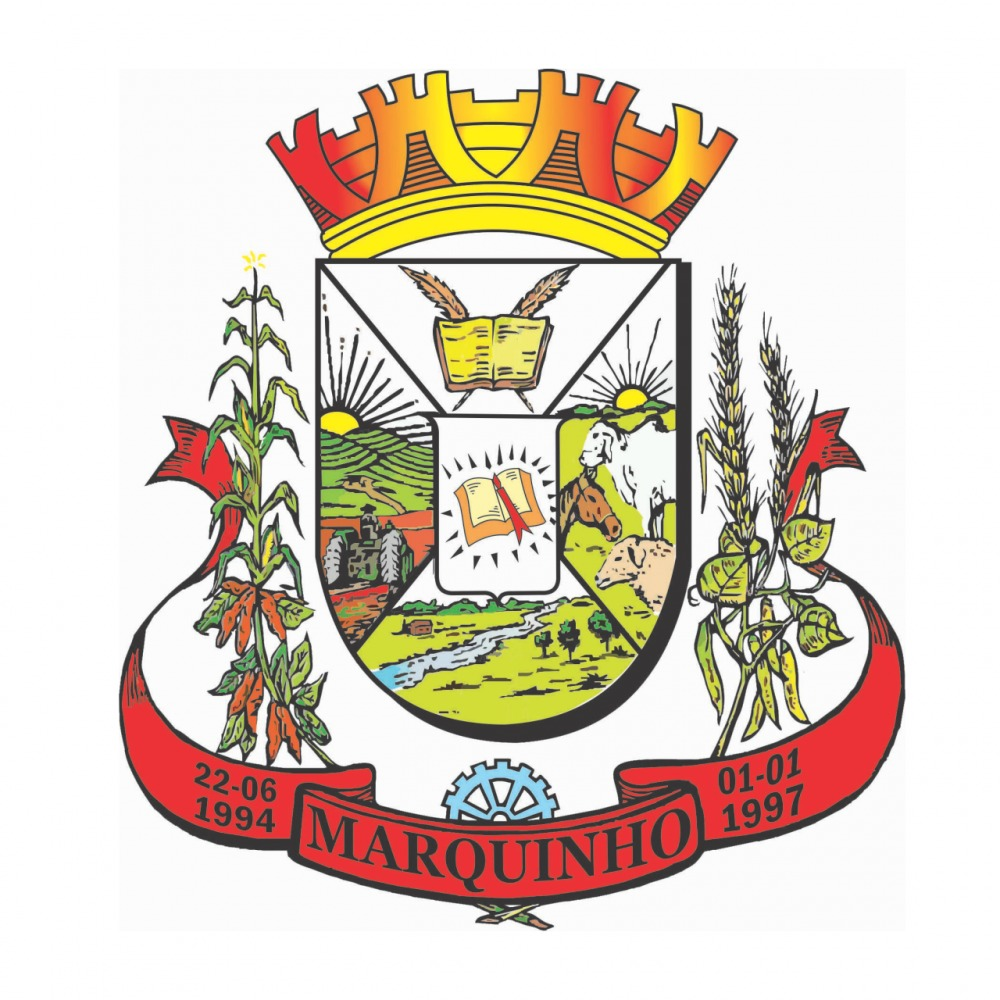
- Flag Coat of arms
- Interactive map of Marquinho, Paraná
- Country: Brazil
- Region: Southern
- State: Paraná
- Mesoregion: Centro-Sul Paranaense

Population (2020)
  - Total: 4,340
- Time zone: UTC−3 (BRT)

Marquinho, Paraná is a municipality in the state of Paraná in the Southern Region of Brazil.

== History ==
The land that would become Marquinho was surveyed by the Indian Francisco Tororó. The founders of the town were José Ribeiro (known as José Grande), Elias Ribeiro, João Ribeiro, Hipólito Ribeiro, Antonio Ribeiro and Pedro Ribeiro.

== See also ==
- List of municipalities in Paraná
