= Shinya Hatta =

Japanese footballer

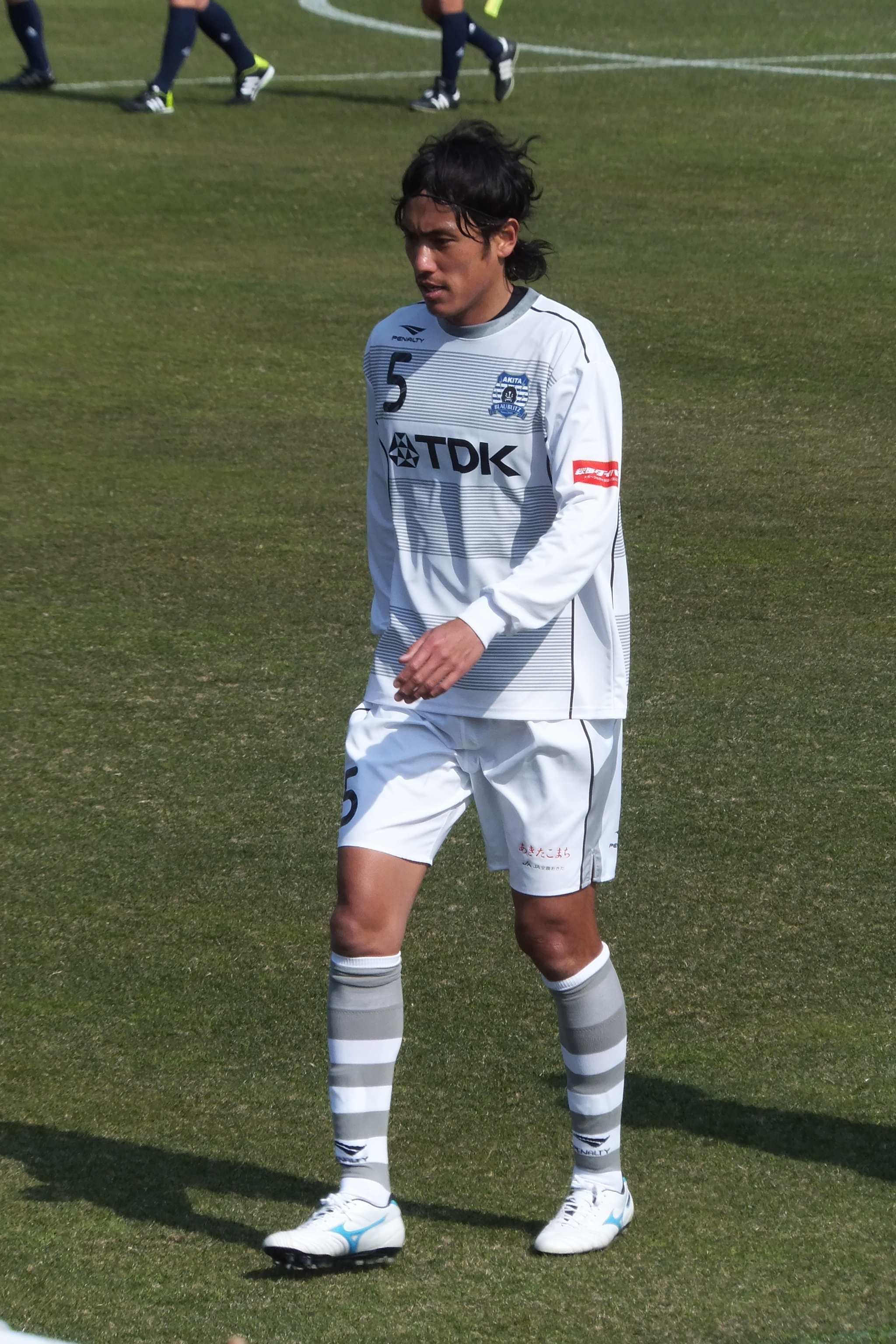

Personal information
- Full name: Shinya Hatta
- Date of birth: May 17, 1984 (age 42)
- Place of birth: Takaishi, Osaka, Japan
- Height: 1.86 m (6 ft 1 in)
- Position: Defender

Youth career
- 2003–2006: Kobe International University

Senior career*
Years	Team	Apps	(Gls)
2007	Mito HollyHock	12	(0)
2008–2009	Kamatamare Sanuki	18	(3)
2010–2012	FC Ryukyu	65	(3)
2013–2015	Blaublitz Akita	63	(7)
Total		158	(13)
- * Club domestic league appearances and goals

Shinya Hatta (初田 真也, Hatta Shinya; born May 17, 1984) is a Japanese former footballer who played as a defender. In 2015, he suffered an injury that kept him out of football for close to two months. He studied coaching on cognitive science. After leaving football he intended to become a highschool teacher, so went back to school to study. He currently works as Renofa Yamaguchi FC's business manager. He also worked as a coach for Kamatamare Sanuki.
