= Mariano Marcos =

Filipino lawyer and politician (1897–1945)

- Photograph of Marcos during the 1920s

Member of the Philippine House of Representatives from Ilocos Norte's 2nd district
- In office June 2, 1925 – June 2, 1931
- Preceded by: Román Pada Campos
- Succeeded by: Emilio Medina

Personal details
- Born: Mariano Marcos y Rubio; April 21, 1897 Batac, Ilocos Norte, Captaincy General of the Philippines
- Died: March 8, 1945 (aged 47) Bacnotan, La Union, Philippine Commonwealth
- Party: Nacionalista
- Spouse: Josefa Edralin (m. 1916)
- Children: 4 (including Ferdinand and Pacifico)
- Relatives: Marcos family; Narciso Ramos (cousin-in-law)
- Occupation: Lawyer, educator, legislator
- Criminal charges: Murder (1939)
- Criminal status: Acquitted (1940)

Mariano Marcos y Rubio (Spanish pronunciation: [maˈɾjano ˈmaɾkos i ˈruβjo]; April 21, 1897 – March 8, 1945) was a lawyer, educator, and politician from Batac, Ilocos Norte, Philippines. A Congressman from 1925 to 1931, he is best known for being the father of Ferdinand Marcos, who was the president of the Philippines from 1965 to 1986, and the grandfather of the current president Bongbong Marcos.

There are conflicting accounts about the exact nature of his death, with the mainstream version coming from American guerrilla unit leader Major Robert Lapham saying that he was drawn and quartered in Bacnotan, La Union by Lapham's guerrilla unit for being a Japanese collaborator. The guerrilla unit was led by Anastacio Badua Buccat of Galongen, Bacnotan, La Union, known by his nom de guerre Kumander Tasyo. This was corroborated by Luis Buccat Aquino, a nephew of Kumander Tasyo, and a member of the guerrilla unit. The Marcos family maintains he was executed by the Japanese, despite Marcos's known collaboration with the imperial government during the war.

He is the namesake of two Philippine state universities: the Mariano Marcos State University in Ilocos Norte, and the Don Mariano Marcos Memorial State University in La Union, as well as the town of Marcos, Ilocos Norte.

== Early life ==
Mariano Marcos was born in Batac, Ilocos Norte on April 21, 1897, to Fabián Marcos y Galimba and Cresencia Rubio y Manglal-lan. A farmer, the elder Marcos had served as gobernadorcillo and justice of the peace of Batac after the Philippine Revolution, who championed the Ilocano language but at the same time cultivated a scholarship in the Spanish language.

A militant follower of Gregorio Aglipay and member of the Philippine Independent Church, he had his son baptised and raised in the Aglipayan faith. Mariano Marcos had his primary and intermediate education in his hometown. Then he went to Manila to study at the Philippine Normal School (now the Philippine Normal University), where he graduated in 1916.

== Education ==
Right after he received his diploma, the Bureau of Education named him maestro insular in Laoag, a position he held until 1917, when he was promoted to maestro principal. A year later, he was enlisted in the National Guard and given the rank of lieutenant. On September 16, 1919, after passing a rigid examination, he was named supervising teacher, a position that required traveling and doing the rounds of the public schools in the whole province. He held this position until January 4, 1921, when he resigned to accept the position of high school teacher at the National University. There is no record whatsoever that Mariano Marcos ever graduated with a law degree from the University of the Philippines. Nor could he have been the class valedictorian in the University of the Philippines College of Law, since the class valedictorian was Rafael Dinglasan. He and his lawyer-brother Pio opened a law office in Batac, with a branch in Manila.

== Political life ==
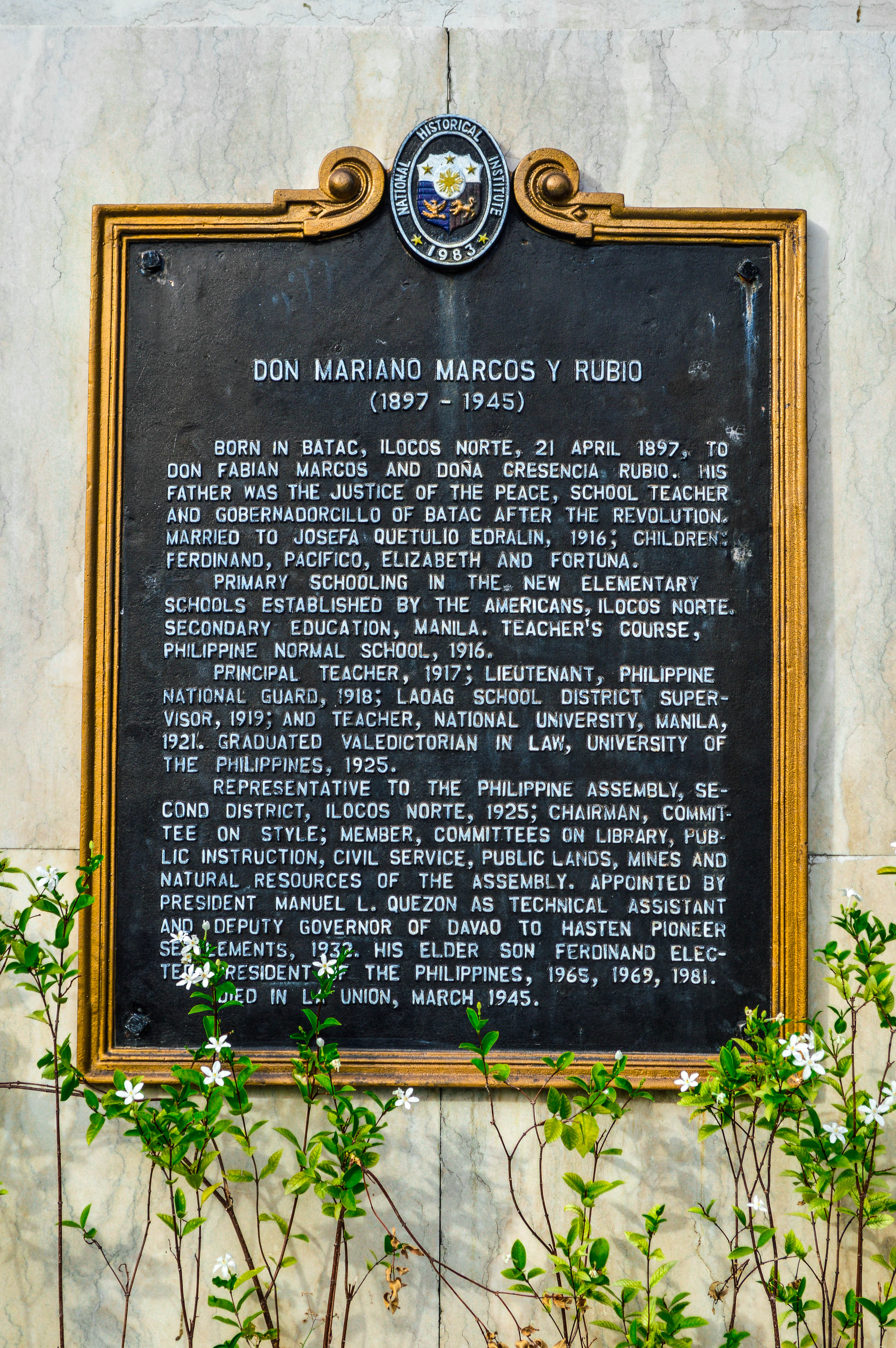
Historical marker by the National Historical Commission dedicated to him.

Meanwhile, with the encouragement of his friends and admirers, he had entered politics. Running under the banner of the Nacionalista Party, and backed by the majority of his fellow Batacqueños, he was elected representative of the second district of Ilocos Norte. Marcos was considered one of the most effective speakers in the entire province during his time. His powerful voice gave him an edge over other politicians during political rallies. He successfully ran for the same position in 1928. In the legislature, he obtained the chairmanship of the powerful committee on ways and means, and likewise served as member of other committees including those on public instruction, public works, public estate, and mines and natural resources. He bid for the same seat in 1932, but lost to his rival from Laoag, Emilio Medina, a consequence of the Batac vote being divided between him and his town mate and fellow candidate, Julio Nalundasan.

== Nalundasan murder and acquittal ==
In 1935, Marcos cast another bid at the legislature, this time for a seat at the National Assembly under the Commonwealth government, but lost to Nalundasan. Two days after the elections, Julio Nalundasan was hit in the head by a rifle shot while inside his home and died instantly. Mariano Marcos, his son Ferdinand, his brother Pio, and his brother-in-law Quirino Lizardo, were accused of the crime and eventually arrested and tried for the crime in 1938. He and his brother were eventually acquitted but his son and brother-in-law were both convicted. A Supreme Court decision penned by Associate Justice Jose P. Laurel would reverse the conviction in 1940. It is believed that the young Marcos's godfather Ferdinand Chua who was also the municipal court judge in Batac interceded for him.

Marcos also placed a bid once more in the 1936 special elections, but lost to Ulpiano Arzadon by a huge margin.

== Death ==
Documents at the Philippine Archives Collection at the U.S. National Archives in Washington D.C. state that Marcos was tried and executed by the Luzon Guerrilla Armed Forces (LGAF), a guerrilla force fighting the Japanese under the command of U.S. Major Robert Lapham.

In Lapham's account, Mariano Marcos was tried, and having "readily confessed," was executed on March 8, 1945, for being a Japanese collaborator by the Luzon Guerrilla Armed Forces. Mariano Marcos was drawn and quartered - his hands were tied to two carabaos, which were then whipped to run in opposite directions. His body parts were then hung by ropes on the branches of a large tree in what is now the Don Mariano Marcos Memorial State University's Bacnotan campus, as a demonstration of what would happen to those who collaborated with the Japanese.

In a book written by Lapham later, he adds that some of the guerrillas who were allowed to participate in the execution were related to Julio Nalundasan.

Members of the Marcos family dispute these accounts, saying that Mariano Marcos was executed by the Japanese. However, it is known that Marcos also gave propaganda speeches on behalf of the Kamishibai or medical treatment squad of the Japanese. Furthermore, Lapham's surviving relative who acted as guard in Lapham's unit reiterated the same story years later, that Marcos was drawn and quartered in Sapilang, Bacnotan, La Union.

== Legacy ==
=== Namesake places and institutions ===
A number of streets and schools in Manila and in the Ilocos Region were named after Mariano Marcos, including the Mariano Marcos State University in Ilocos Norte, the Don Mariano Marcos Memorial State University in La Union, and the former Don Mariano Marcos Avenue in Quezon City. The National Historical Institute installing a historical marker concerning his life at the Mariano Marcos State University campus in Batac, Ilocos Norte on October 24, 1982.

The town of Marcos, Ilocos Norte, was named after Mariano Marcos in 1963 when it was created as a separate town from Dingras, Ilocos Norte through Republic Act No. 3753.

=== The Marcos dynasty ===
Because the Nalundasan murder trial resulting drew wide public attention in the years immediately prior to the war, Mariano's son Ferdinand was in an ideal political position to enter politics in the postwar years. Ferdinand Marcos's rise to power was dramatic. He served three terms in Mariano's own former position as the Philippine House of Representatives as the Congressman for the second district of Ilocos Norte, from 1949 to 1959. Between 1959 and 1965, he served in the Philippine Senate, where he became Senate President until he won the Philippine Presidential Election of 1965 to become the tenth president of the Philippines, staying in the position for 20 years despite the eight year (two four-year terms) limitation set by the 1935 Constitution of the Philippines by placing the country under Martial Law in 1972.

This would pave the way for other members of the Marcos family to be appointed or elected to various national elections - what would eventually become known as the Marcos dynasty. Ferdinand's wife Imelda became the Governor of Metro Manila as appointed head of the Metro Manila Commission from 1975 to 1986 and Assemblywoman in the Batasan Pambansa for Region IV-A from 1978 to 1984. Ferdinand's sister Elizabeth Marcos-Keon became the Governor of Ilocos Norte from 1971 to 1983. Son Bongbong Marcos became the Vice Governor of Ilocos Norte from 1980 to 1983 and later Governor of that same province from 1983 to 1986. First-born daughter Imee Marcos became the chairman of the Kabataang Barangay from 1975 to 1986.

Although the Marcos family was removed from power by civilian protests during the 1986 People Power Revolution, President Corazon Aquino eventually allowed the members of the Marcos family to return to the Philippines after the death of Ferdinand Marcos, supposedly so that they could face various corruption charges. Within a year of arriving, Imelda Marcos ran president in the 1992 Philippine presidential election, finishing 5th out of 7 candidates. In that same year, Marcos Jr. ran in a much smaller local election rather than a national race, easily regaining the family's traditional post of Congressman for the second district of Ilocos Norte. Since then, Imelda, Ferdinand Jr., and Imee Marcos have run for numerous posts, winning posts alternately, including the house seat for the second district of Ilocos Norte and the governorship of Ilocos Norte. Ferdinand Jr. became a Senator from 2010 to 2016, and ran for the post of Vice President during the 2016 Philippine National election, but narrowly lost to Leni Robredo.

In the May 13, 2019 National and Local Election, Imee was elected as a senator.

In 2022, Ferdinand Jr. was elected president of the Philippines, marking the return of the Marcoses to Malacañang, via landslide victory. Meanwhile, his son Sandro was elected representative of the 1st district of Ilocos Norte and was later named House Senior Deputy Majority Leader.

== Personal life ==
One of his co-graduates at the Philippine Normal School was Josefa Edralin (1893–1988), a lady four years his senior and hailing from a landed family whom he married that same year. They had four children:

- Ferdinand Marcos (1917–1989), who became president of the Philippines (1965–1986)
- Pacifico Marcos (1919–most likely 1998), a physician
- Elizabeth Marcos-Keon (1926–1986), former Ilocos Norte governor (1971–1983) and mother of Michael Marcos Keon
- Fortuna Marcos-Barba (1931–2018)
