= Marcão (footballer, born February 1973) =

Brazilian footballer

Personal information
- Full name: Marcos Antônio Ronconi
- Date of birth: 5 February 1973 (age 53)
- Place of birth: Maracajá, Brazil
- Position: Goalkeeper

Youth career
- 1989–1995: Joinville

Senior career*
Years	Team	Apps	(Gls)
1995–2005	Joinville		
2006	Bahia		
- * Club domestic league appearances and goals as of 28 March 2024

Marcos Antônio Ronconi (born 5 February 1973), better known as Marcão, is a Brazilian former professional footballer who played as a goalkeeper.

== Career ==
A graduate of Joinville EC, Marcão was the club's starting goalkeeper in their second state championship in 2000 and 2001, becoming one of the greatest players in the team's history.

== Honours ==
Joinville

- Campeonato Catarinense: 2000, 2001
