= Kenichi Mori =

Japanese footballer

Personal information
- Date of birth: October 23, 1984 (age 42)
- Place of birth: Gunma, Japan
- Height: 1.68 m (5 ft 6 in)
- Position: Midfielder

Youth career
- 2003–2006: Meiji University

Senior career*
Years	Team	Apps	(Gls)
2007–2010	Mito HollyHock	46	(0)
Total		46	(0)
- * Club domestic league appearances and goals

Kenichi Mori (森 賢一, Mori Kenichi; born October 23, 1984) is a former Japanese football player.

== Club statistics ==
Club performance			League		Cup		Total	
Season	Club	League	Apps	Goals	Apps	Goals	Apps	Goals
Japan			League		Emperor's Cup		Total	
2007	Mito HollyHock	J2 League	3	0	0	0	3	0
2008	Mito HollyHock	J2 League	4	0	0	0	4	0
2009	Mito HollyHock	J2 League	22	0	1	0	23	0
2010	Mito HollyHock	J2 League	17	0	2	0	19	0
Country	Japan		46	0	3	0	49	0
Total			46	0	3	0	49	0
