= Ipuã =

- Municipality
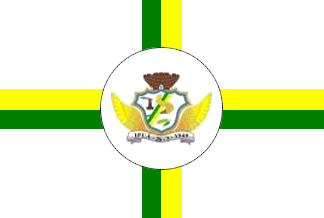
- Flag Coat of arms

- Location in São Paulo state

- Location in Brazil
- Coordinates: 20°26′17″S 48°0′44″W
- Country: Brazil
- Region: Southeast
- State: São Paulo

Area
  - Total: 466 km^{2} (180 sq mi)

Population (2020)
  - Total: 16,604
  - Density: 35.6/km^{2} (92.3/sq mi)
- Time zone: UTC−3 (BRT)

Ipuã is a municipality in the state of São Paulo in Brazil. The population is 16,604 (2020 est.) in an area of 466 km^{2} (180 sq mi). The elevation is 555 m.

== History ==
The municipality was created by state law in 1948.

Map of the state of São Paulo (1948).

== Religion ==
Christianity is present in the city as follows:

=== Catholic Church ===
The Catholic church in the municipality is part of the Roman Catholic Diocese of Barretos.

=== Protestant Church ===
The most diverse evangelical beliefs are present in the city, mainly Pentecostal, including the Assemblies of God in Brazil (the largest evangelical church in the country), Christian Congregation in Brazil, among others. These denominations are growing more and more throughout Brazil.

== See also ==
- List of municipalities in São Paulo
