= Marcão (footballer, born April 1973) =

Brazilian footballer

Personal information
- Full name: Marcos Antonio Aparecido Cipriano
- Date of birth: 14 April 1973 (age 53)
- Place of birth: Andirá, Paraná, Brazil
- Height: 1.85 m (6 ft 1 in)
- Position: Forward

Youth career
- Juventus-SP
- Araçatuba
- Sport Club do Recife
- Flamengo-RJ

Senior career*
Years	Team	Apps	(Gls)
1991	Matsubara	15	(8)
1992–1993	Montevideo Wanderers		
1993	Sport Recife		
1994	Matsubara	6	(4)
1994–1995	Torino	4	(0)
1995	→ Neuchâtel Xamax (loan)	2	(0)
1995–1998	Mogi Mirim		
1999	Mirassol	24	(2)
2000	Spartak-d Moscow	4	(0)
2000–2001	Spartak Moscow	10	(1)
2001–2003	St. Pauli	24	(2)
2003	Vitória		
2004	Bahia	17	(1)
2004–2005	Guarani		
2006	Yverdon-Sport	17	(1)
2006–2008	Nacional de Rolândia		
2008	Portuguesa Londrinense		
- * Club domestic league appearances and goals

Marcos Antonio Aparecido Cipriano or simply Marcão (born 14 April 1973) is a Brazilian former professional footballer who played as a forward.

== Club career ==
He played in the 2000–01 UEFA Champions League with FC Spartak Moscow. He scored twice on 27 September 2000 in a 3–1 victory over Sporting CP and then twice more on 22 November 2000 in their 4–1 defeat of Arsenal.
