= Marquinhos (footballer, born August 1982) =

Brazilian footballer

Personal information
- Full name: Marcos Aurélio Lima Barros
- Date of birth: August 16, 1982 (age 44)
- Place of birth: Franca, São Paulo, Brazil
- Height: 1.81 m (5 ft 11 1/2 in)
- Position: Midfielder

Youth career
- 199?–2001: Rio Ave

Senior career*
Years	Team	Apps	(Gls)
2001–2003	Vianense		
2003–2005	Oliveira do Bairro	32	(2)
2005–2007	Rio Ave	23	(3)
2006	→ Caldense (loan)		
2007	→ Francana (loan)		
2008	Gama		
2008	Arapongas		
2010	Francana		
- * Club domestic league appearances and goals

Marcos Aurélio Lima Barros (born August 16, 1982), commonly known as Marquinhos, is a former Brazilian footballer who played as a midfielder.

== Career ==
Marquinhos began his career in Portuguese football as a youngster with Rio Ave. He played in lower-division senior football with Vianense and Oliveira do Bairro before making his Primeira Liga debut with Rio Ave in April 2005. He scored three goals from 23 appearances, mostly in the 2005–06 season, before spending loan spells at Brazilian clubs Caldense in 2006 and Francana, his hometown team, in 2007. He returned to Brazil permanently in 2008 and played for Gama, Arapongas and another spell with Francana.
