= Marquinhos Cambalhota =

Brazilian footballer

Personal information
- Full name: Weimar Marcos Rodrigues
- Date of birth: 9 August 1984 (age 42)
- Place of birth: Curitiba, Brazil
- Height: 1.72 m (5 ft 8 in)
- Position: Striker

Team information
- Current team: Santa Quitéria-PR

Senior career*
Years	Team	Apps	(Gls)
2003	Vila Fanny	–	(–)
2003–2004	Trieste	–	(–)
2005	São Bernardo	–	(–)
2006–2014	Cianorte	6	(0)
2008	→ Grêmio Barueri (loan)	–	(–)
2009	→ Guarani (loan)	6	(0)
2010	→ Guaraní CE (loan)	–	(–)
2010	→ Chapecoense (loan)	1	(0)
2012	→ Camboriú (loan)	–	(–)
2013	→ Coquimbo Unido (loan)	12	(0)
2013	→ Trieste (loan)	–	(–)
2014–2017	Novo Mundo	–	(–)
2015	→ J. Malucelli (loan)	1	(0)
2015	→ Lajeadense (loan)	4	(0)
2017–2019	Trieste	–	(–)
2018	→ União Beltrão (loan)	3	(1)
2022–	Santa Quitéria-PR	–	(–)
- * Club domestic league appearances and goals as of 15 July 2022

Weimar Marcos Rodrigues (born 9 August 1984), known as Marquinhos Cambalhota, is a Brazilian footballer who plays for Santa Quitéria-PR as a striker.

He played at Lajeadense in the Campeonato Gaúcho.

He signed a two-year contract with Cianorte in July 2007. He signed a new five-year contract in March 2008, but he was on loan to Grêmio Barueri at Série B since April 2008.

In April 2009 he was loaned to Guarani of Série B.

In 2013, he signed for Coquimbo Unido.
