= Atsushi Matsuura (footballer) =

Japanese footballer

Atsushi Matsuura 松浦 淳
Personal information
- Full name: Atsushi Matsuura
- Date of birth: January 10, 1982 (age 44)
- Place of birth: Hiroshima, Japan
- Height: 1.82 m (5 ft 11 1/2 in)
- Position: Forward

Youth career
- 1997–1999: Hiroshima Fuchu High School
- 2000–2003: Tokyo Gakugei University

Senior career*
| Years | Team | Apps | (Gls) |
| 2004 | Mito HollyHock | 18 | (2) |
| Total | | 18 | (2) |
- * Club domestic league appearances and goals

Atsushi Matsuura (松浦 淳, Matsuura Atsushi; born January 10, 1982) is a former Japanese football player.

== Playing career ==
Matsuura was born in Hiroshima Prefecture on January 10, 1982. After graduating from Tokyo Gakugei University, he joined J2 League club Mito HollyHock in 2004. He debuted on May 19 and played many matches as forward in 2004 season. He retired end of 2004 season.

== Club statistics ==
| Club performance | | | League | | Cup | | Total | |
| Season | Club | League | Apps | Goals | Apps | Goals | Apps | Goals |
| Japan | | | League | | Emperor's Cup | | Total | |
|---|---|---|---|---|---|---|---|---|
| 2004 | Mito HollyHock | J2 League | 18 | 2 | | | 18 | 2 |
| Total | | | 18 | 2 | 0 | 0 | 18 | 2 |
