= Kazuhiko Wakasugi =

Japanese fencer

Personal information
- Born: 30 January 1947 (age 79) Aichi Prefecture, Japan

Sport
- Sport: Fencing

Kazuhiko Wakasugi (若杉 和彦, Wakasugi Kazuhiko; born 30 January 1947) is a Japanese fencer. He competed in the team foil event at the 1968 Summer Olympics.
