= Yuya Iwadate =

Japanese footballer

Yuya Iwadate 岩舘 侑哉
Personal information
- Full name: Yuya Iwadate
- Date of birth: May 25, 1985 (age 41)
- Place of birth: Tokyo, Japan
- Height: 1.80 m (5 ft 11 in)
- Position: Forward

Youth career
- 2001–2003: Kawasaki Frontale

Senior career*
Years	Team	Apps	(Gls)
2004–2007	Mito HollyHock	72	(2)
2008–2009	Kamatamare Sanuki	17	(12)
2010	TTM Phichit		
2010	Army United		
Total		89	(14)
- * Club domestic league appearances and goals

Yuya Iwadate (岩舘 侑哉, Iwadate Yuya; born May 25, 1985) is a former Japanese football player.

== Career statistics ==
Appearances and goals by club, season and competition
Club	Season	League			Emperor's Cup		Total	
Club	Season	Division	Apps	Goals	Apps	Goals	Apps	Goals
Mito HollyHock	2004	J2 League	0	0	0	0	0	0
Mito HollyHock	2005	J2 League	21	0	1	0	22	0
Mito HollyHock	2006	J2 League	17	1	0	0	17	1
Mito HollyHock	2007	J2 League	34	1	1	0	35	1
Kamatamare Sanuki	2008	Regional Leagues	9	9	2	0	11	9
Kamatamare Sanuki	2009	Regional Leagues						
Career total			81	11	4	0	85	11
