= Marcos =

Marcos may refer to:

== People with the given name Marcos ==
- Marcos (given name)
- Marcos family

== Sports ==
Surnamed

- Dayton Marcos, Negro league baseball team from Dayton, Ohio (early twentieth-century)
- Dimitris Markos, Greek footballer
- Nélson Marcos, Portuguese footballer
- Randa Markos, Iraqi-Canadian female mixed martial artist

Nicknamed simply as Marcos

- Marcos Pereira Martins (born 1943), Brazilian football winger
- Marcos Roberto Silveira Reis (born 1973), Brazilian football goalkeeper
- Marcos Joaquim dos Santos (born 1975), Brazilian footballer
- Marcos de Paula (born 1983), Brazilian footballer
- Marcos Alonso Peña (born 1959), Spanish footballer

Named

- Marcos Ambrose, Australian racing driver currently competing in NASCAR
- Marcos Baghdatis, Cypriot tennis player
- Marcos Bristow, Indian badminton player
- Marcos Hernández (swimmer), Cuban freestyle swimmer
- Marcos Pizzelli, Brazilian-Armenian footballer
- Marcos García Barreno, Spanish footballer
- Marcos Mazzaron, Brazilian cyclist
- Marcos Carneiro de Mendonça (1894–1988), first goalkeeper of the Brazil national team, later president of Fluminense FC
- Marcos do Nascimento Teixeira, Brazilian footballer, known as Marcão

== Politics ==
=== Marcos Family ===
- Ferdinand Marcos (1917–1989), 10th President of the Philippines (1965–1986)
- Sandro Marcos (born 1994), current Representative of Ilocos Norte's First District
- Bongbong Marcos (born 1957), former senator and former Representative of Ilocos Norte, son of Ferdinand and Imelda Marcos, and 17th President of the Philippines (2022-present)
- Imelda Marcos (born 1929), former First Lady, widow of Ferdinand Marcos, and powerful political figure in the Philippines
- Imee Marcos (born 1955), current senator
- Irene Marcos-Araneta (born 1960), the daughter of Ferdinand and Imelda Marcos
- Matthew Marcos Manotoc (born 1988), son of Imee
- Mariano Marcos (1897–1945), lawyer and politician in Ilocos Norte, Philippines, father of Ferdinand Marcos
- Michael Marcos Keon (born 1954), nephew of Ferdinand
- Angelo Marcos Barba (born 1958), Filipino politician
- Pacífico Marcos (1919–c. 2016), younger brother of Ferdinand

=== Others ===
- Subcomandante Marcos, also known as Delegate Zero, spokesperson for the Zapatista Army of National Liberation
- Rabban Marcos, 13th-century cleric later elected as the Nestorian patriarch, Mar Yaballaha III
- Markos Moulitsas, owner of the largest political blog in the US, Daily Kos

== Geography ==
- Marcos, Ilocos Norte, Philippines
- Marcos Castellanos
- San Marcos, Antioquia
- San Marcos, Baja California Sur
- San Marcos, California
- San Marcos, Costa Rica
- San Marcos, Guatemala
- San Marcos, Guerrero
- San Marcos, Nicaragua
- San Marcos, Texas
- San Marcos (department)
- Márkos, the Hungarian name for Mărcuş village, Dobârlău Commune, Covasna County, Romania

== Automobiles ==
- Marcos Engineering, British sportscar manufacturer

- Marcos Mantis GT, sports car
- Mini Marcos,

== Military ==
- USS San Marcos (LSD-25), Casa Grande-class dock landing ship
- MARCOS, India's elite marine commando force

== Television and film ==
- Lisa Marcos, Canadian actress
- Niurka Marcos, Cuban-Mexican singer, dancer and actress
- Marcos A. Rodriguez, Cuban-American businessman
- K. G. Markose, Indian Playback singer

== Art ==
- Lajos Markos, painter
- Pablo Marcos, artist

== Education ==
- San Marcos High School (Santa Barbara, California), public high school located in the California central coast city of Santa Barbara
- Mariano Marcos State University, public university in Ilocos Norte, Philippines

== Other ==
- Chrysostomos Markose, leader of the Syriac Orthodox Church in India
- Pacífico Marcos, former president of the Philippine Medical Association
- Marco's Pizza
