= Kazuhiko Shingyoji =

Japanese footballer

Kazuhiko Shingyoji 眞行寺 和彦
Personal information
- Full name: Kazuhiko Shingyoji
- Date of birth: February 5, 1986 (age 40)
- Place of birth: Koto, Tokyo, Japan
- Height: 1.71 m (5 ft 7 1/2 in)
- Position: Midfielder

Youth career
- 2001–2003: Shutoku High School

Senior career*
Years	Team	Apps	(Gls)
2004–2008	Mito HollyHock	100	(5)
2009–2011	Blaublitz Akita	63	(3)
Total		163	(8)
- * Club domestic league appearances and goals

Kazuhiko Shingyoji (眞行寺 和彦, Shingyōji Kazuhiko; born February 5, 1986) is a Japanese former football player.

== Club statistics ==
Club performance			League		Cup		Total	
Season	Club	League	Apps	Goals	Apps	Goals	Apps	Goals
Japan			League		Emperor's Cup		Total	
2004	Mito HollyHock	J2 League	8	0	0	0	8	0
2005	Mito HollyHock	J2 League	22	0	2	0	24	0
2006	Mito HollyHock	J2 League	32	2	0	0	32	2
2007	Mito HollyHock	J2 League	30	2	1	0	31	2
2008	Mito HollyHock	J2 League	8	1	1	0	9	1
2009	TDK	Football League	16	2	1	0	17	2
2010	Blaublitz Akita	Football League						
Total			116	7	5	0	121	7
