= Tonan Maebashi =

Japanese football club

Tonan Maebashi tonan前橋
- Full name: Tonan Maebashi; Soccer Club
- Founded: 1982; 43 years ago
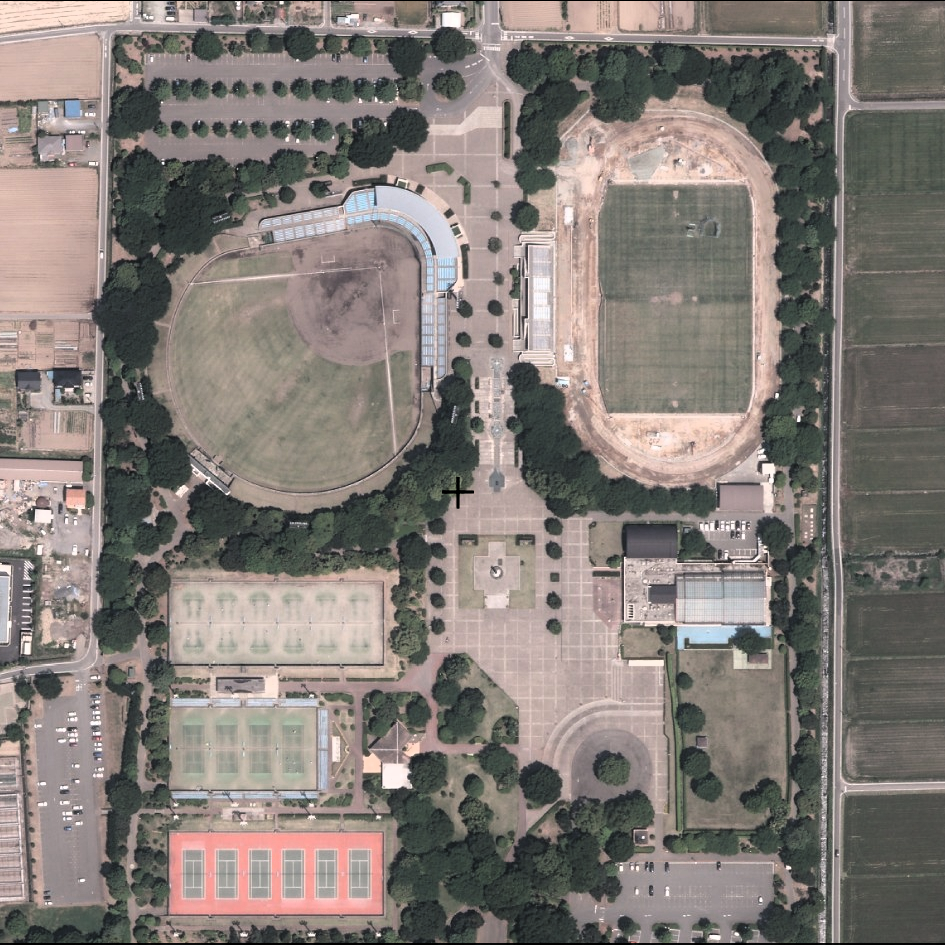
- Ground: Maebashi Athletic Stadium Maebashi, Gunma
- Chairman: Hiroshi Sugahara
- Manager: Hiroyuki Sawada
- League: Kanto Soccer League 2nd Div.
- 2024: 3rd of 10
- Website: tonan-sc.jp
Home colours	Away colours

Tonan Maebashi is a Japanese football club based in Maebashi, Gunma. They play in the 2nd division of the Kantō Soccer League.

== Stadium ==
In the 2020 Kanto Soccer League, home games will be held at the Gunma Electric Athletics and Soccer Stadium at Maebashi Sports Park and the NTT Zuminan Super Ground.

In 2013, when the team applied for associate membership in the J.League, they chose the Maebashi Sports Park Athletics and Soccer Stadium as their home ground (in 2013, only the final match was held here).

As a reason for sticking to Maebashi Sports Park as a home base, in the web magazine THE PAGE, Hiroshi Sugawara said, "Shikishima soccer field, athletics stadium Shoda Shoyu Stadium, Gunma belongs to Gunma Prefecture, so I just want to go to J3 from Maebashi City (General Sports Park)." However, according to the J.League license and J3 standards, the capacity must be 5,000 or more in principle, and facilities such as locker rooms, waiting rooms, and press conference halls for players and referees are required.

== Squad ==
As of 23 August 2023.

Note: Flags indicate national team as defined under FIFA eligibility rules; some limited exceptions apply. Players may hold more than one non-FIFA nationality.

No.	Pos.	Nation	Player
1	GK	JPN	Hiroya Yoshiuchi
2	DF	JPN	Yoshiaki Otsuka
3	DF	JPN	Kanta Takahashi
4	DF	JPN	Hikaru Yasuda
5	MF	JPN	Daichi Inui
6	DF	JPN	Jun Tanaka
7	MF	JPN	Daiki Hiraishi
8	MF	JPN	Kanta Hamaya
9	FW	JPN	Shoma Misao
11	FW	JPN	Yudai Saito
13	FW	PRK	Kim Seong-cheol
14	MF	JPN	Akihiro Miyazaki
15	MF	JPN	Rei Nakajima
16	DF	JPN	Tomoki Yoshiuchi
17	FW	JPN	Kazuma Takehana

No.	Pos.	Nation	Player
18	FW	JPN	Masato Yoshiuchi
19	FW	JPN	Ryota Tomita
20	DF	JPN	Jun Hayashi
22	MF	KOR	Park Se-jun
24	DF	JPN	Taishi Nishimura
25	MF	JPN	Tomoki Chosa
26	DF	JPN	Haruki Morishita
27	MF	JPN	Asahi Kodate
29	FW	BRA	Victor
30	MF	BRA	Felipe Freitas
31	FW	BRA	Mateus Katai
33	MF	JPN	Genki Hoshi
34	MF	JPN	Tatsuki Yanagihara
41	GK	JPN	Go Kaburaki
