= Momoyamadai Station =

Metro station in Suita, Osaka Prefecture, Japan

Momoyamadai Station 桃山台駅
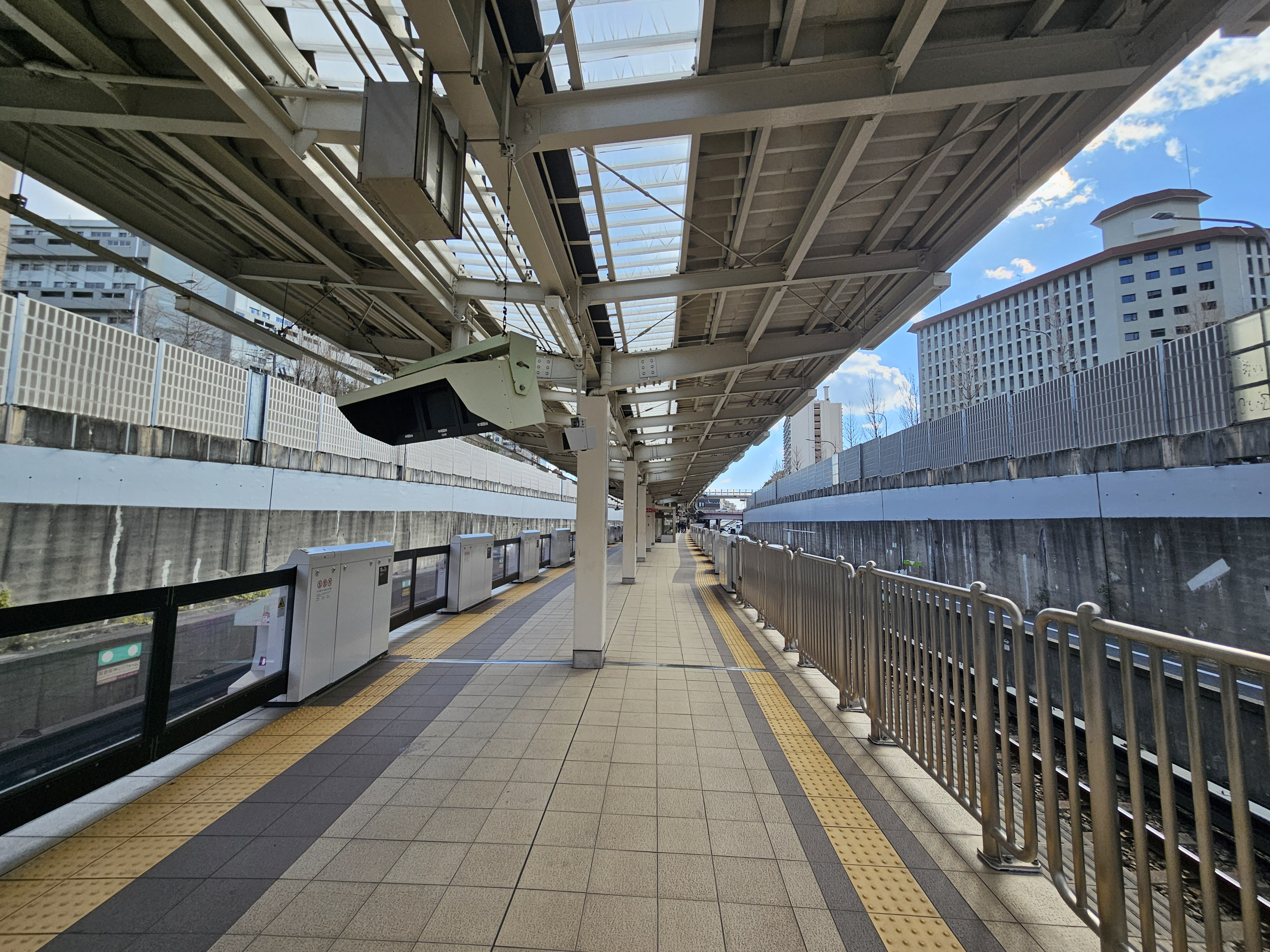
- Platform

General information
- Location: 5-1-1, Momoyamadai, Suita, Osaka （大阪府吹田市桃山台五丁目1-1） Japan
- Coordinates: 34°47′33.45″N 135°29′50.60″E
- Operator: Kita-Osaka Kyuko Railway
- Line: Namboku Line
- Platforms: 2
- Tracks: 2
- Connections: Bus terminal

Construction
- Structure type: Below-grade
- Accessible: Yes

Other information
- Station code: M09
- Website: Official website

History
- Opened: 1970

Services
Preceding station	Kita-Osaka Kyuko Railway	Following station
Senri-Chūō M08 towards Minoh-kayano	Namboku Line	Ryokuchi-kōen M10 towards Esaka
Location

Momoyamadai (桃山台駅, Momoyamadai-eki) is a train station on the Kita-Osaka Kyuko Railway (which links directly into the Osaka Municipal Subway Midosuji Line) located in Suita, Osaka, Japan.

== Line ==
- Kita-Osaka Kyuko Railway Namboku Line (Station Number: M09)

== Layout ==
- There is an island platform with two tracks between "Shin-Midosuji".

1	■ Namboku Line	for Esaka and (Osaka Municipal Subway Midosuji Line) Nakamozu
2	■ Namboku Line	to Minoh-Kayano

== Surroundings ==
- Momoyama Park
- AZALL Momoyamadai
- Japan National Route 423 (Shin-Midosuji)
- Hankyu Oasis
- Momoyamadai Depot
- Bus stops for Hankyu Bus Co., Ltd. (for Suita and Toyonaka)
- Expressway bus stop (Senri New Town)
