= Ryokuchi-kōen Station =

Metro station in Toyonaka, Osaka Prefecture, Japan

Ryokuchi-kōen Station 緑地公園駅
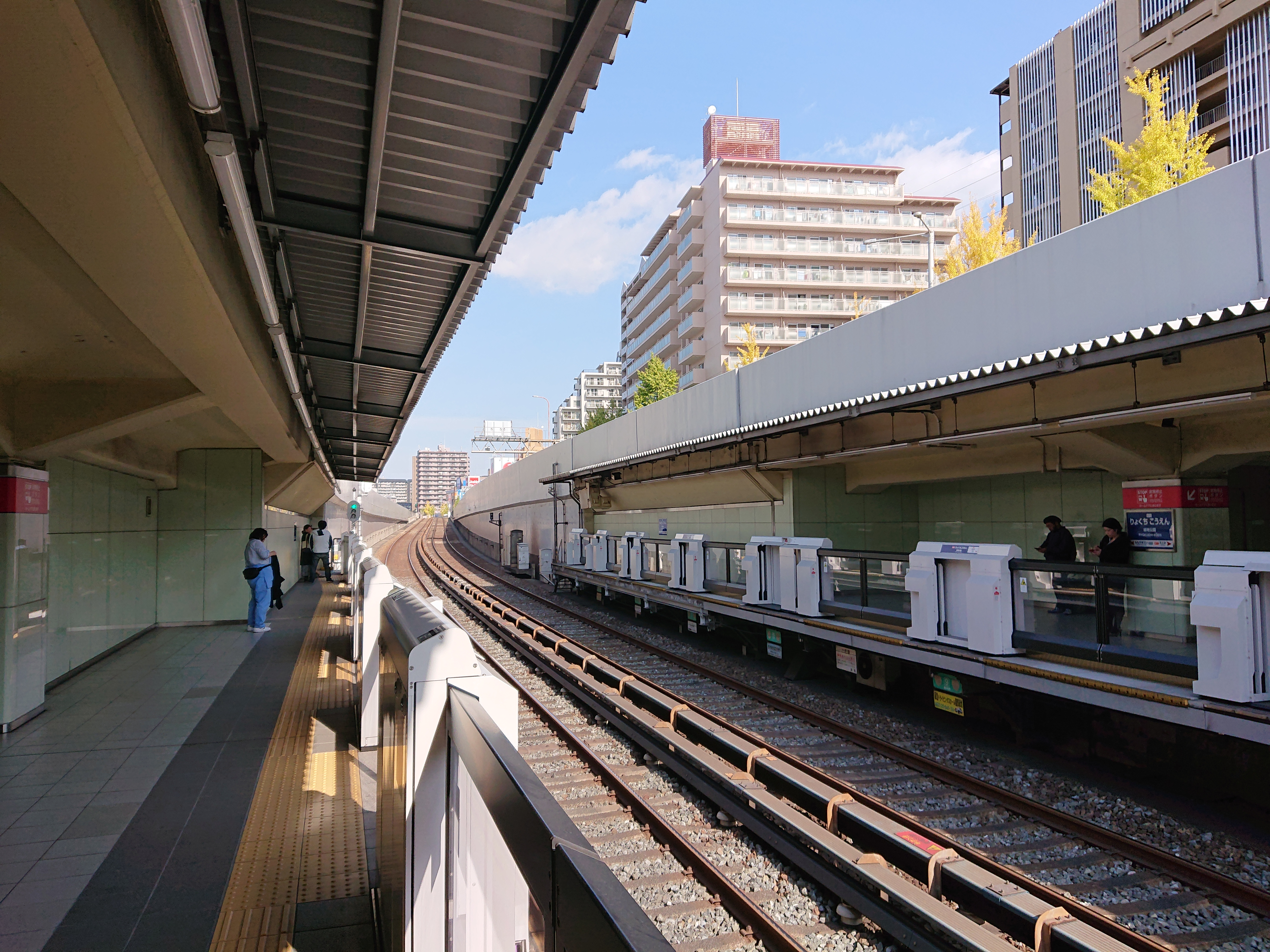
- The platforms at Ryokuchi-kōen Station on the Kita-Osaka Kyuko Railway

General information
- Location: 18-1, Higashi-Terauchichō, Toyonaka, Osaka （大阪府豊中市東寺内町18-1） Japan
- Coordinates: 34°46′32.04″N 135°29′43.57″E
- Operator: Kita-Osaka Kyuko Railway
- Line: Namboku Line
- Connections: Bus stop

Construction
- Structure type: Ground level
- Accessible: Yes

Other information
- Station code: M10
- Website: Official website

History
- Opened: March 30, 1975

Passengers
- 34,150 daily

Services
Preceding station	Kita-Osaka Kyuko Railway	Following station
Momoyamadai M09 towards Minoh-kayano	Namboku Line	Esaka M11 Terminus
Location

Ryokuchi-kōen (緑地公園駅, Ryokuchi-kōen-eki) is a train station on the Kita-Osaka Kyuko Railway (which links directly into the Osaka Metro Midosuji Line) located in Toyonaka, Osaka, Japan. It is named after the nearby Hattori Ryokuchi Park.

== Line ==
- Kita-Osaka Kyuko Railway Namboku Line (Station Number: M10)

== Layout ==
- There are 2 side platforms serving a track each under the roads Shin-Midosuji.

1	■ Namboku Line	for Esaka and (Osaka Metro Midosuji Line) Nakamozu
2	■ Namboku Line	for Minoh-Kayano

== Surroundings ==
- Hattori Ryokuchi Park
- Toyonaka Municipal Terauchi Elementary School
- Japan National Route 423
- Hankyu Oasis
- Kita-Osaka Kyuko Railway Co., Ltd.
- Tengyu-syoten

== History ==
The platforms and underground passage of this station were situated to be able to open any time when the Kitakyu Namboku Line was opened in 1970. In those days, there was no development for residence around the area of the prepared station. Due to the development, the station was opened as an infill station on March 30, 1975.
