= Minoh-Semba Handai-mae Station =

Metro station in Suita, Osaka Prefecture, Japan

Minoh-Semba Handai-mae Station 箕面船場阪大前駅
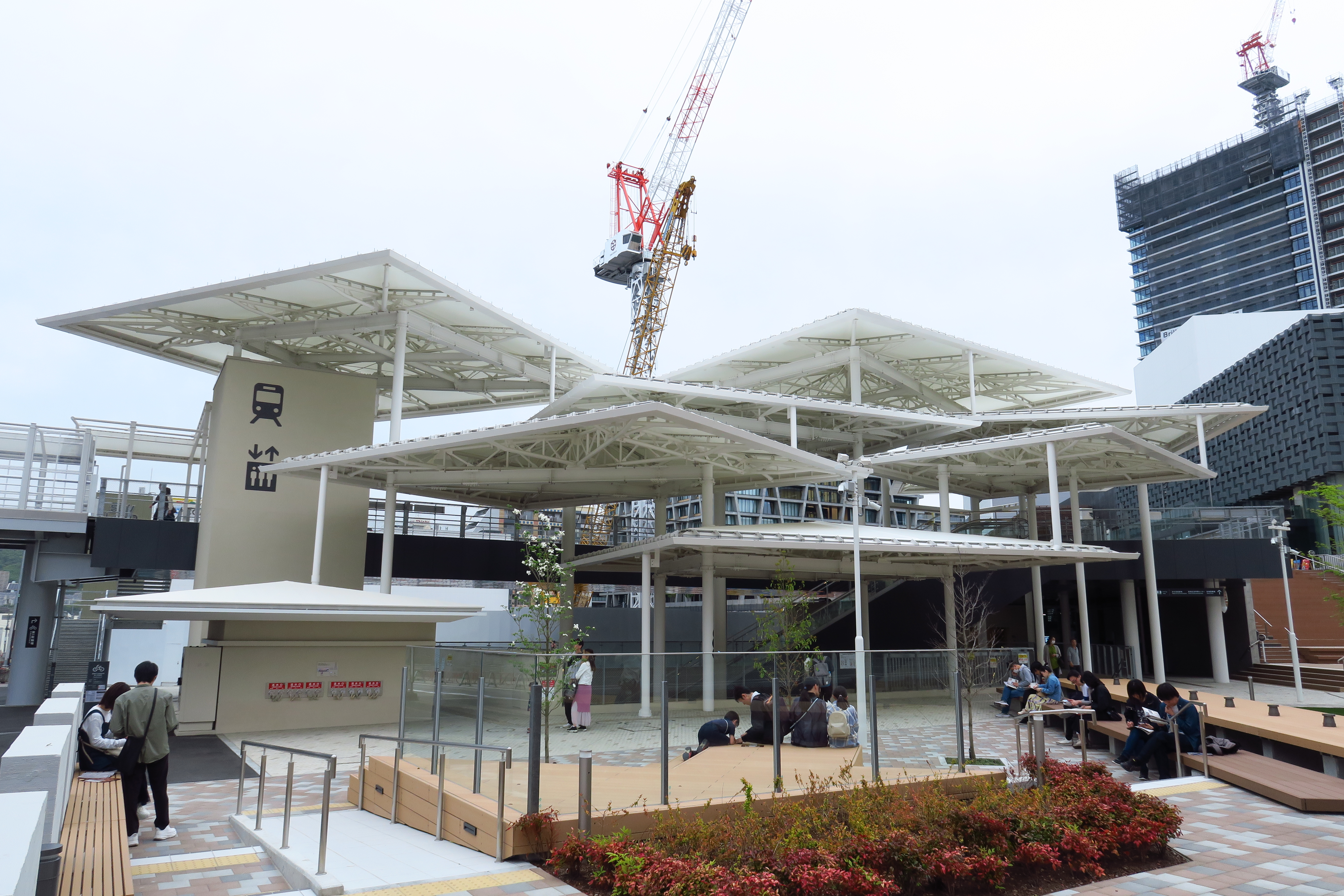
- Station entrance in April 2024

General information
- Location: Minoo, Osaka; Japan
- Coordinates: 34°49′16″N 135°29′25″E
- Operator: Kita-Osaka Kyuko Railway
- Line: Namboku Line
- Platforms: 1 Island platform
- Tracks: 2
- Connections: Bus terminal

Construction
- Structure type: Underground
- Accessible: Yes

Other information
- Station code: M07

History
- Opening: 23 March 2024

Services
Preceding station	Kita-Osaka Kyuko Railway	Following station
Minoh-Kayano M06 towards Minoh-kayano	Namboku Line	Senri-Chūō M08 towards Esaka
Location

Minoh-Semba Handai-mae Station (箕面船場阪大前, Minoo Senba Handaimae eki) is a train station on the Kita-Osaka Kyuko Railway (which links directly into the Osaka Municipal Subway Midosuji Line) located in Minoh, Osaka, Japan.

== Layout ==
There is an island platform with two tracks.

1	■ Namboku Line	for Esaka and (Osaka Municipal Subway Midosuji Line) Nakamozu
2	■ Namboku Line	to Minoh-Kayano

== History ==
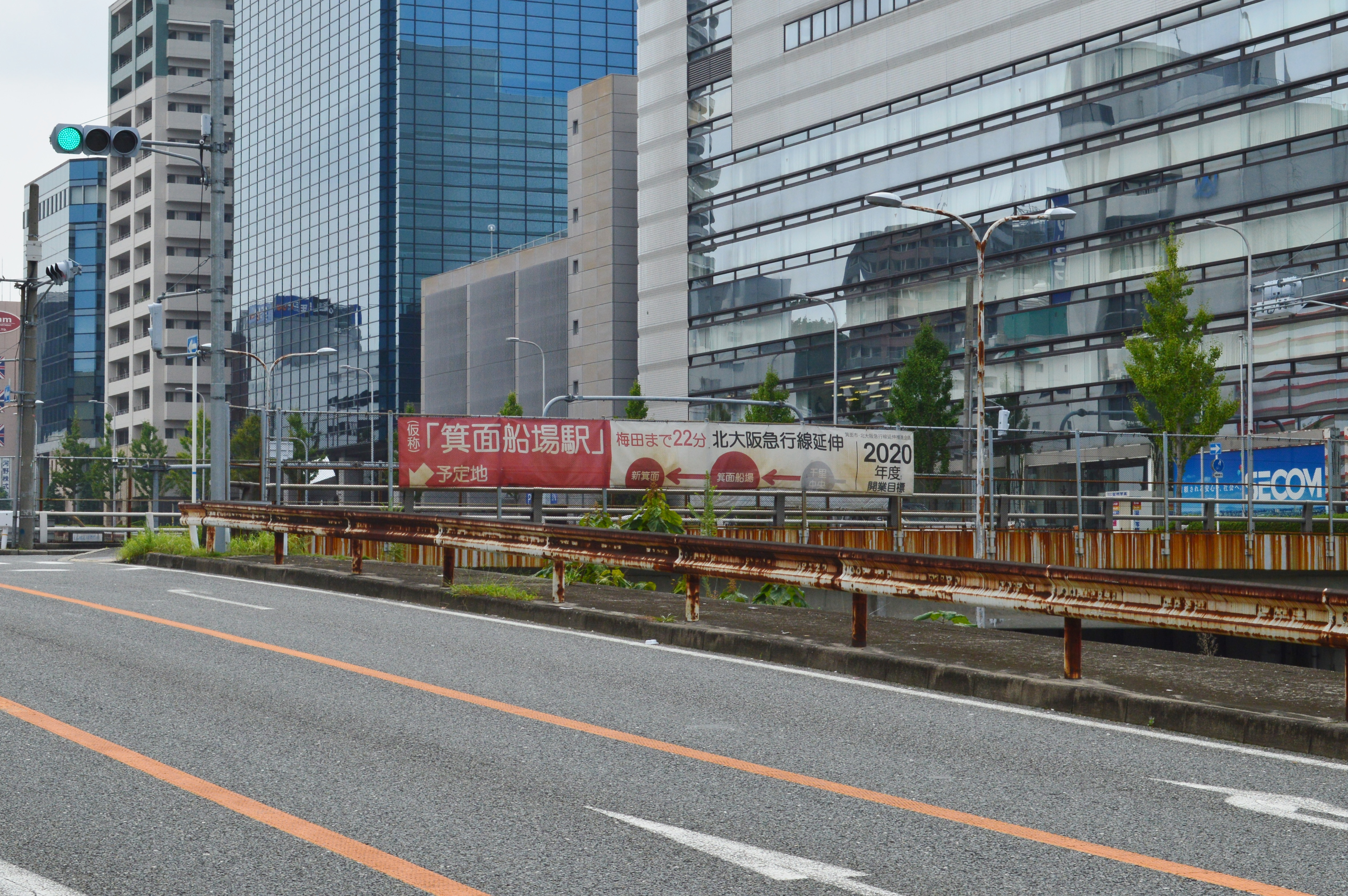
Planned station site in October 2016.

The name of the station was finalized in 2018.

The station opened on 23 March 2024 after delays prolonged the project's original scheduled completion in 2020.

== Surroundings ==
- Osaka University Minoh campus (station namesake); houses the School of Foreign Studies, replacing the former Osaka University of Foreign Studies Minoh campus
