= Shinkanaoka Station =

Metro station in Sakai, Japan

Shinkanaoka Station 新金岡駅
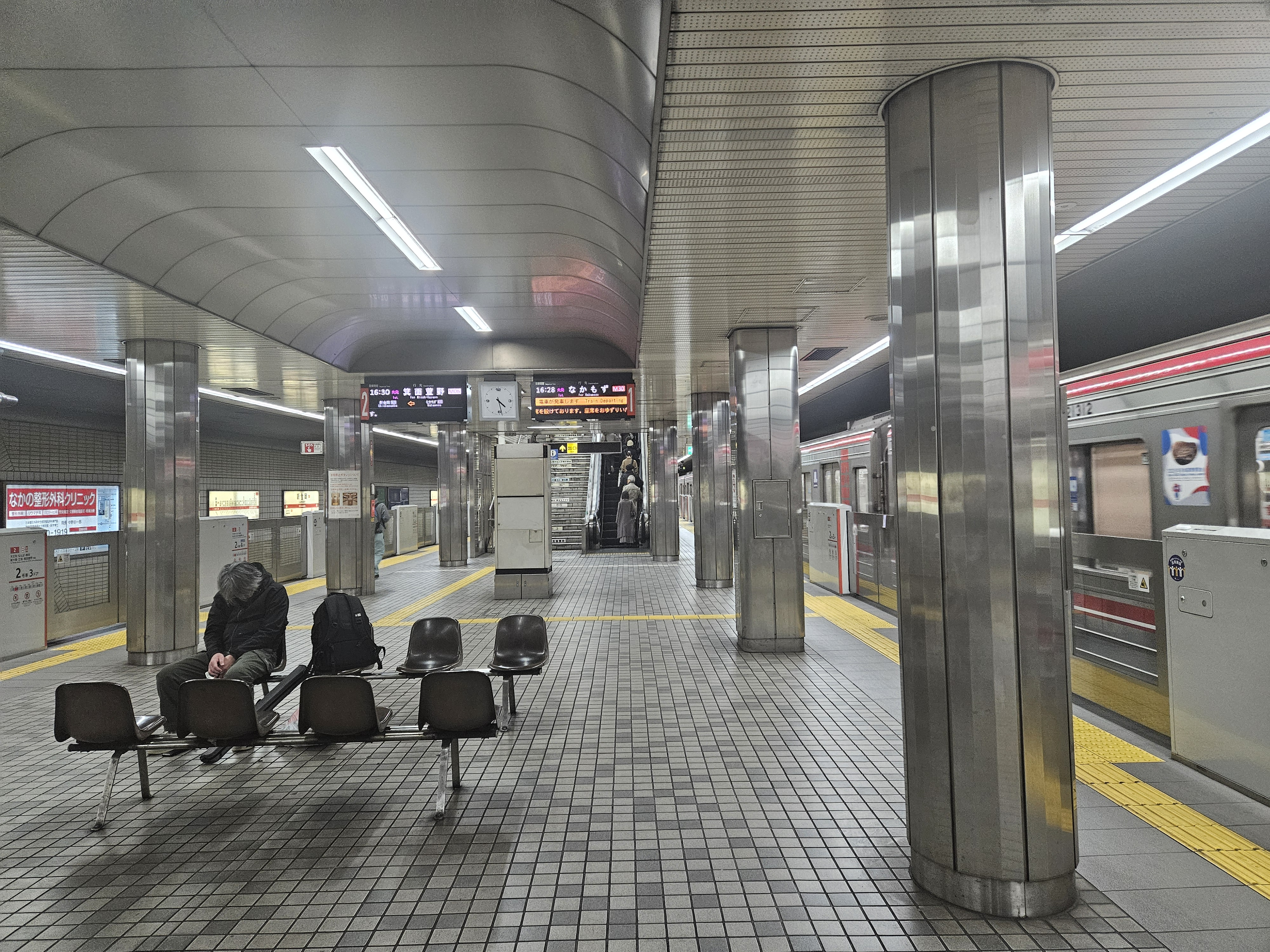
- Station platform

General information
- Location: 1-7-2 Shinkanaokacho, Kita-ku, Sakai-shi, Osaka-fu 591-8021; Japan
- Coordinates: 34.5672°N 135.5148°E
- System: Osaka Metro
- Operator: Osaka Metro
- Line: Midōsuji Line
- Distance: 19.3 km (12.0 mi) from Esaka
- Platforms: 1 island platform
- Tracks: 2

Construction
- Structure type: Underground
- Accessible: yes

Other information
- Station code: M 29
- Website: Official website

History
- Opened: 18 April 1987; 39 years ago

Passengers
- 2020: 18,868 daily

Services
Preceding station	Osaka Metro	Following station
Kitahanada M 28 towards Esaka	Midōsuji Line	Nakamozu M 30 Terminus
Location
- Location within Osaka Prefecture Location within Japan

Shinkanaoka Station (新金岡駅, Shinkanaoka) is a metro station located in Kita ward, Sakai, Osaka Prefecture, Japan, operated by the Osaka Metro. It has the station number "M29".

== Lines ==
Shinkanaoka Station is served by the Midōsuji Line, and is 23.0 kilometers from the terminus of the line at Esaka and 31.4 kilometers from Minoh-kayano.

== Layout ==
The station consists of one underground island platform.

=== Platforms ===
1	■ Midōsuji Line	to Nakamozu
2	■ Midōsuji Line	for Tennōji, Namba, Umeda and Minoh-kayano

== History ==
Shinkanaoka Station opened on April 18, 1987.

The facilities of the Midosuji Line were inherited by Osaka Metro after the privatization of the Osaka Municipal Transportation Bureau on 1 April 2018.

== Passenger statistics ==
In fiscal 2020, the station was used by an average of 18,868 passengers daily.

== Surrounding area ==
- Sakai City Kita Ward Office
- Sakai City Shinkanaokahigashi Elementary School
- Osaka Labor Disaster Hospital
- Shinkanaoka Housing Complex

== See also ==
- List of railway stations in Japan
