= Kita-Osaka Kyuko 9000 series =

Japanese train type

Kita-Osaka Kyuko 9000 series Polestar II
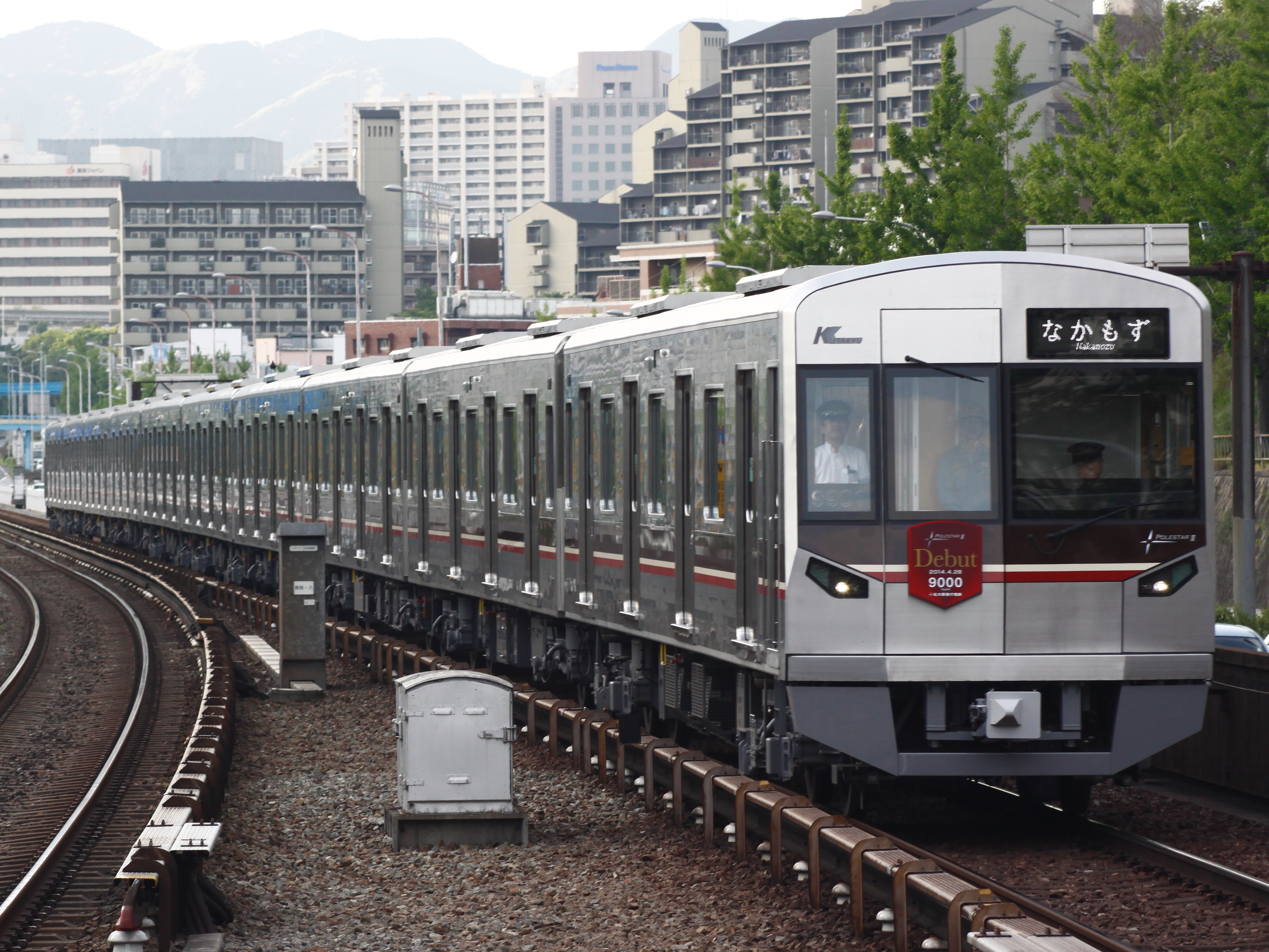
- The first 9000 series set in May 2014
- In service: April 2014 – present
- Manufacturer: Kinki Sharyo
- Replaced: 8000 series
- Constructed: 2014–
- Number under construction: 10 vehicles (1 set)
- Number built: 60 vehicles (6 sets)
- Number in service: 50 vehicles (5 sets)
- Formation: 10 cars per trainset
- Operators: Kita-Osaka Kyuko Railway
- Depots: Momoyamadai Depot
- Lines served: Kitakyu Namboku Line, Midōsuji Line

Specifications
- Car body construction: Stainless steel
- Car length: 18,900 mm (62 ft 0 in) (end cars); 18,700 mm (61 ft 4 in) (intermediate cars)
- Width: 2,880 mm (9 ft 5 in)
- Height: 3,745 mm (12 ft 3.4 in)
- Doors: 4 pairs per side
- Maximum speed: 95 km/h (60 mph)
- Traction system: Variable-frequency
- Traction motors: Permanent-magnet synchronous motor
- Power output: 170 kW x 4 per motored car
- Acceleration: 2.8 km/(h⋅s) (1.7 mph/s)
- Deceleration: 3.5 km/(h⋅s) (2.2 mph/s) (service); 4.5 km/(h⋅s) (2.8 mph/s) (emergency)
- Electric system(s): 750 V DC (third rail)
- Current collector(s): Contact shoe
- Bogies: SS178M (motor); SS178T (trailer)
- Track gauge: 1,435 mm (4 ft 8 1/2 in)

The Kita-Osaka Kyuko 9000 series (北大阪急行電鉄9000形) is an electric multiple unit (EMU) train type operated by Kita-Osaka Kyuko Railway ("Kitakyu") on the Kitakyu Namboku Line in north Osaka since April 2014.

== Formation ==
As of 1 April 2015, two 10-car sets are in operation, formed as shown below, with four motored ("M") cars and six non-powered trailer ("T") cars, and car 1 at the Senri-Chuo end.

Car No.	1	2	3	4	5	6	7	8	9	10
Designation	Mc1	Tp	Te	T1	M2	M1	T2	Te	Tp	Mc2
Numbering	900x	910x	920x	930x	940x	950x	960x	970x	980x	990x
Weight (t)	37.6	28.8	30.7	27.5	36.4	36.4	27.5	30.7	28.8	37.6
Capacity (Total/seated)	128/39	138/45	138/45	138/45	138/45	138/45	138/45	138/45	138/45	128/39

== Interior ==
Passenger accommodation consists of longitudinal bench seating with "golden olive" green moquette seat covers. LED lighting is used throughout. Each car includes a wheelchair space.

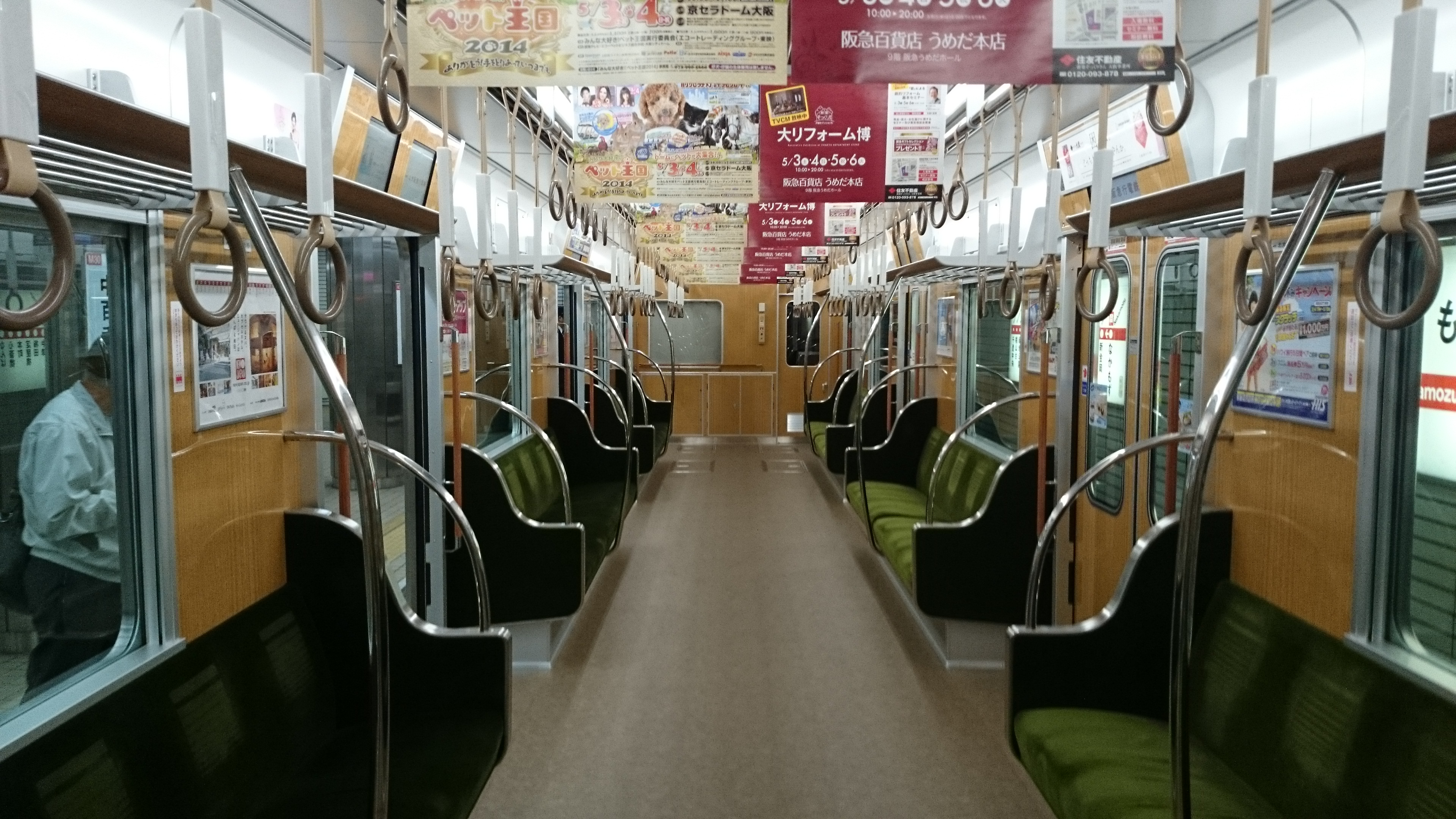
The interior of set 9001 in May 2014

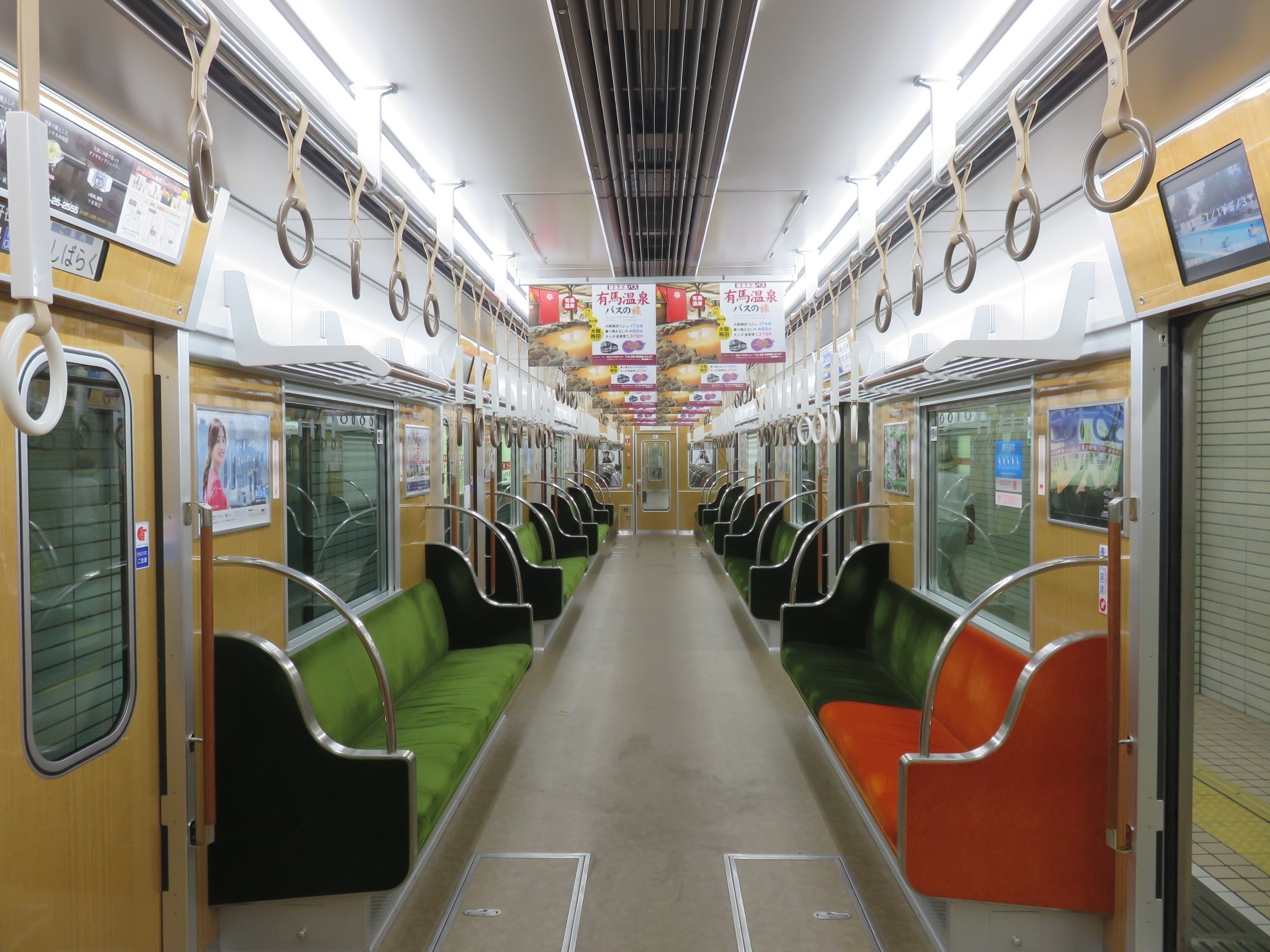
The interior of 3rd-batch set 9003 in August 2016

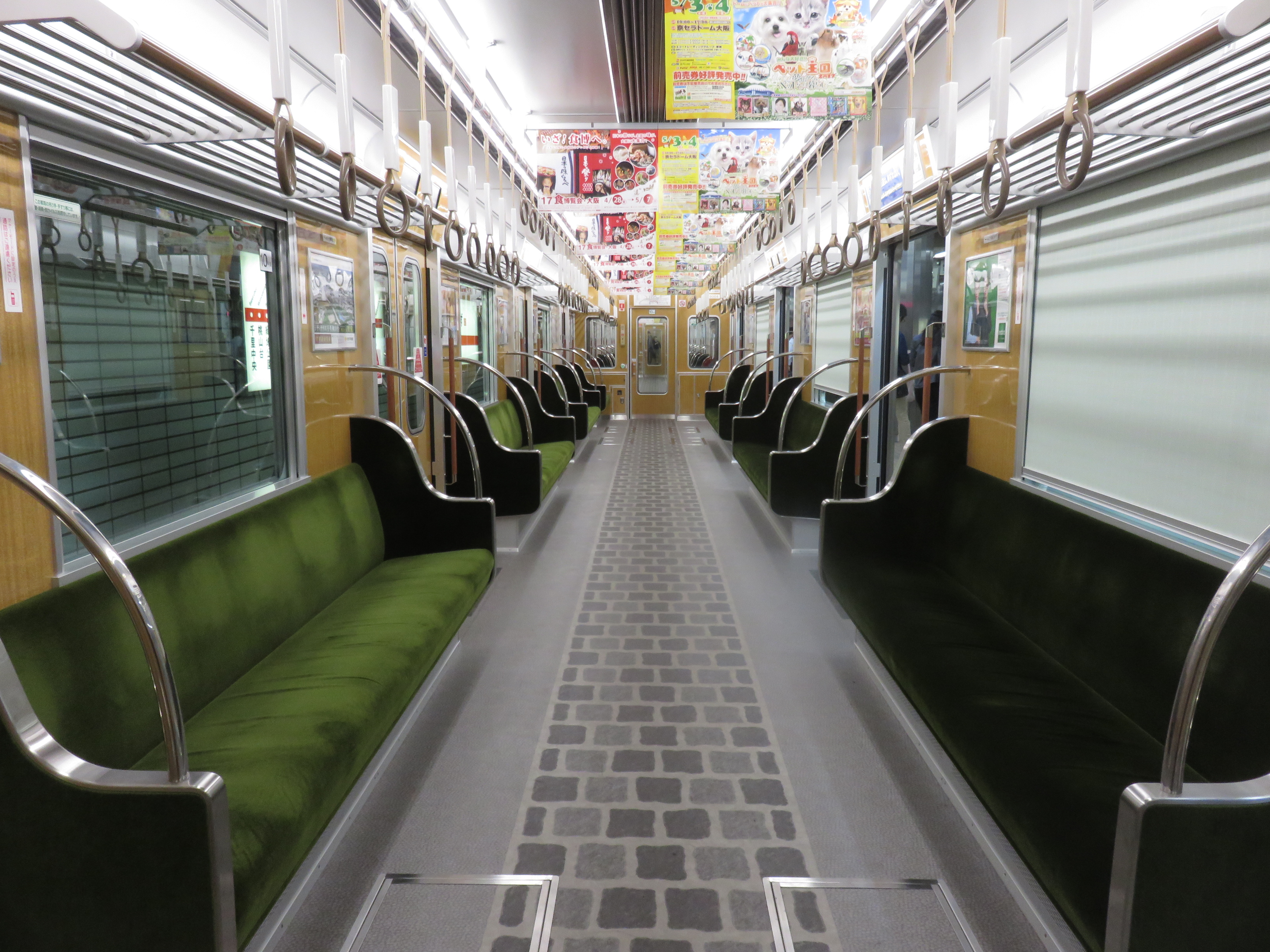
The interior of 4th-batch set 9004 in May 2017

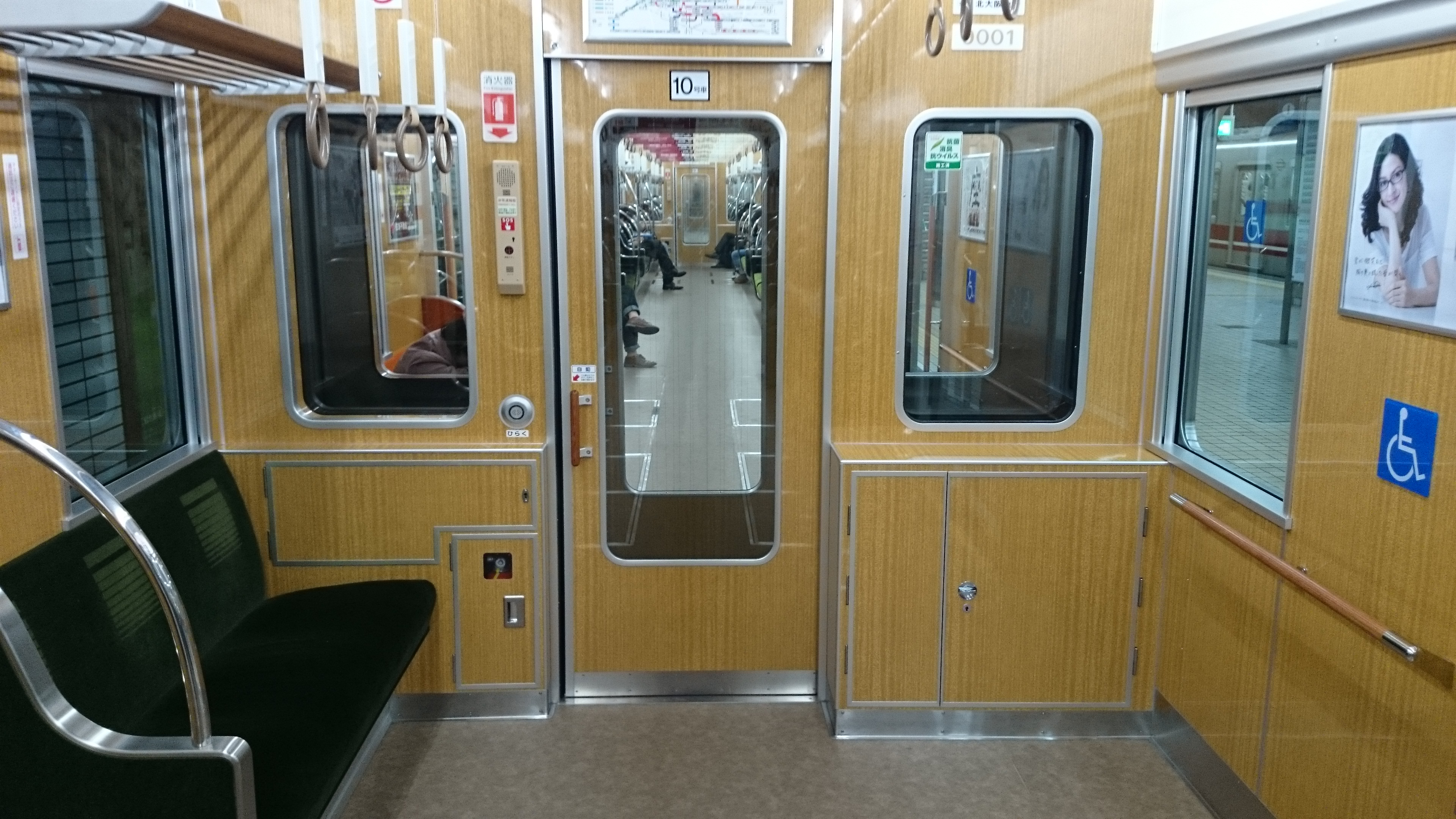
The interior of set 9001 in May 2014, showing a wheelchair space

== History ==
The first set entered revenue service on 28 April 2014. The third set, 9003, entered service on 27 February 2016. This set features a full-body brown and cream vinyl wrapping livery.

A fourth set was delivered and is in service as of June 2022.

An additional three sets were ordered in 2021 to complement the opening of the Namboku Line extension to Minō-Kayano Station which is scheduled to open by the end of 2023. Each of the three new train sets were wrapped in one of two special liveries to mark the extension of the line into the city of Minoh.

=== Fleet history ===
The build details for the fleet are as shown below.

Set No.	Manufacturer	Date delivered
9001	Kinki Sharyo	21 April 2014
9002	Kinki Sharyo	2 February 2015
9003	Kinki Sharyo	January 2016
9004		August 2020
9005		2023
9006		2023

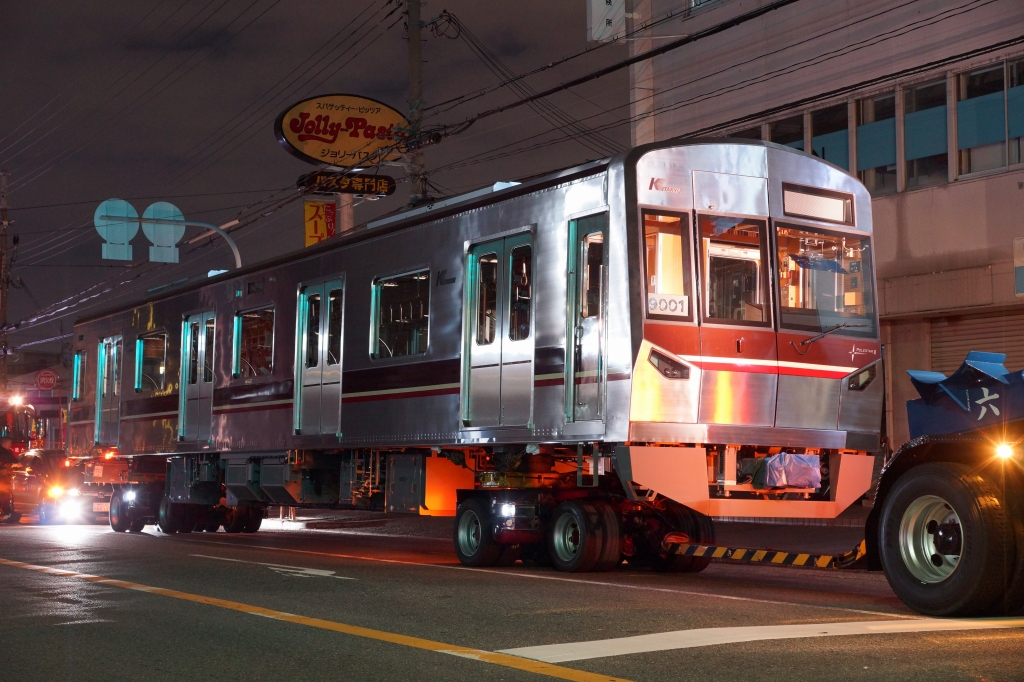
The first set being delivered by road in 2014

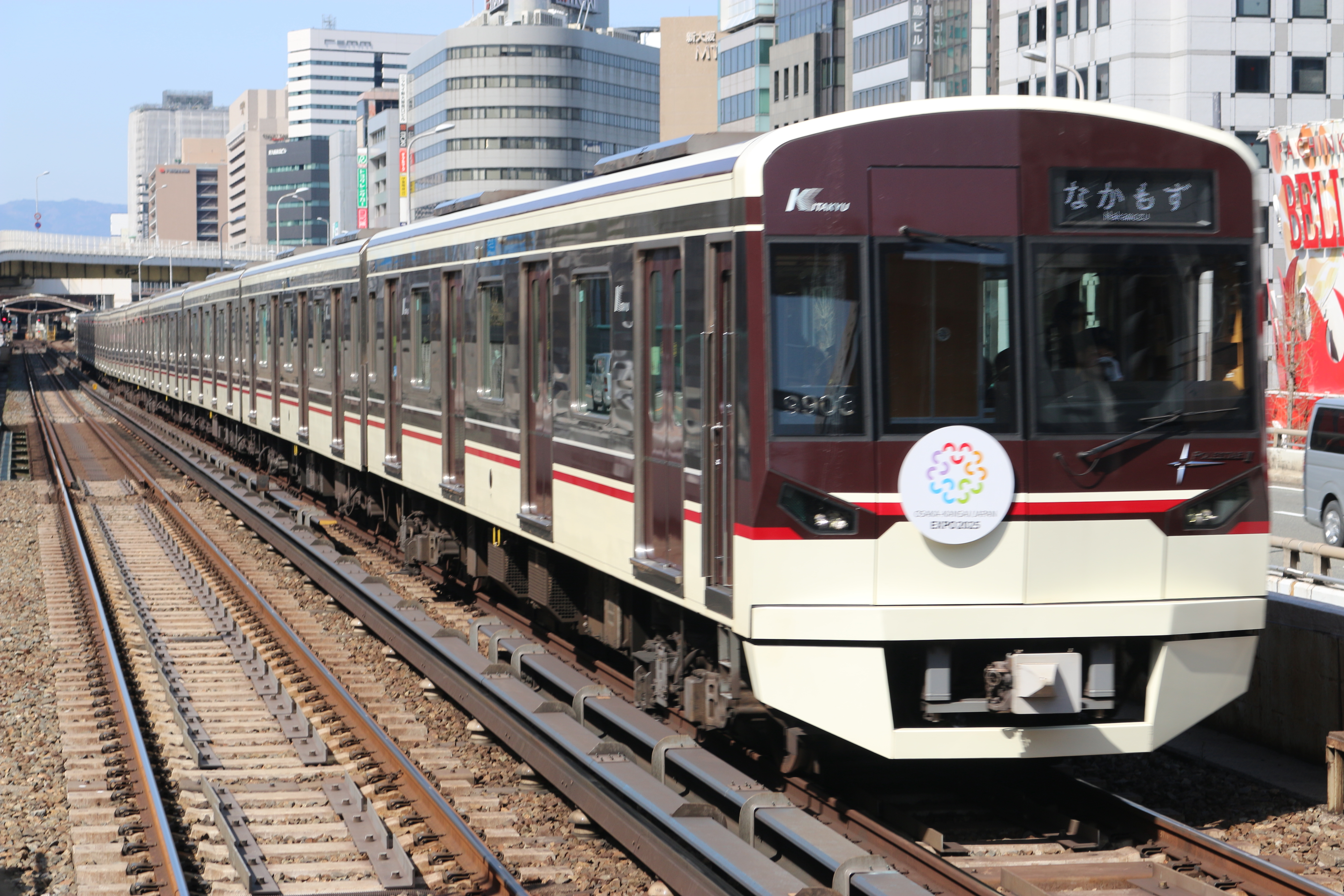
Set 9003 in service in February 2016

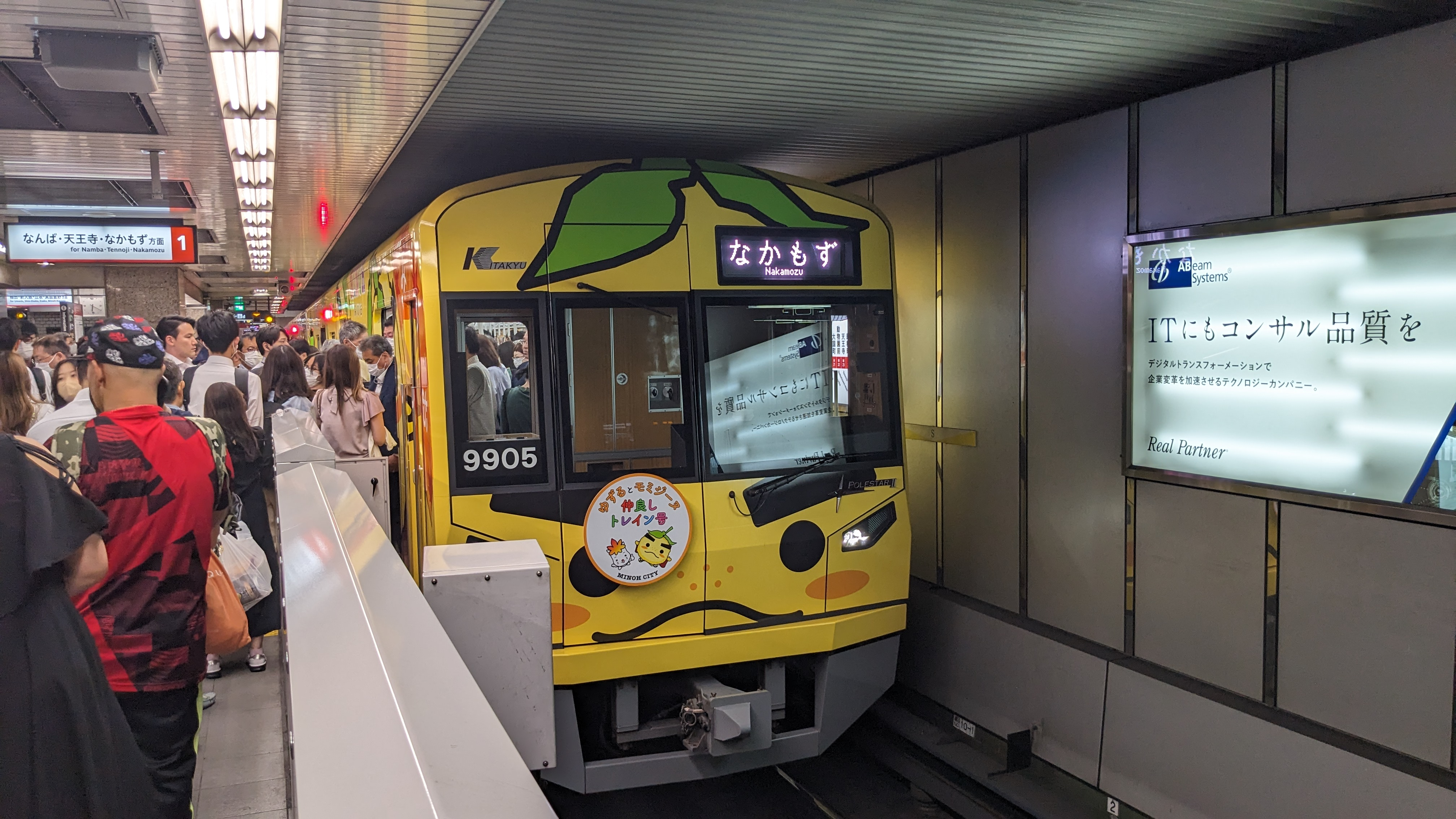
Set 9005 with a Minoh livery in June 2024

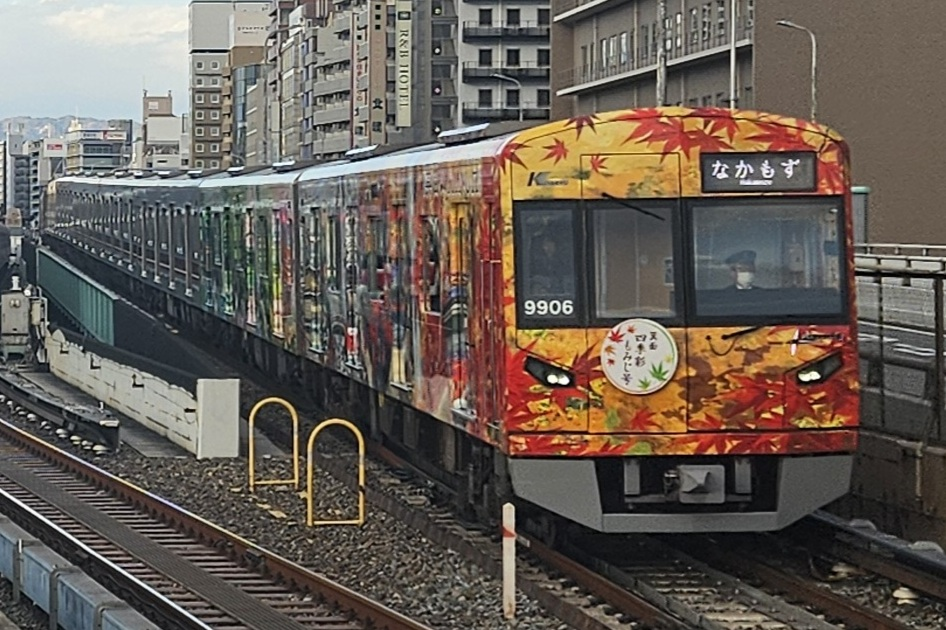
Set 9006 with a Minoh livery in December 2024
