= Higashi-Mikuni Station =

Metro station in Osaka, Japan

Coordinates: 34.7408°N 135.4987°E

Higashi-Mikuni Station 東三国駅
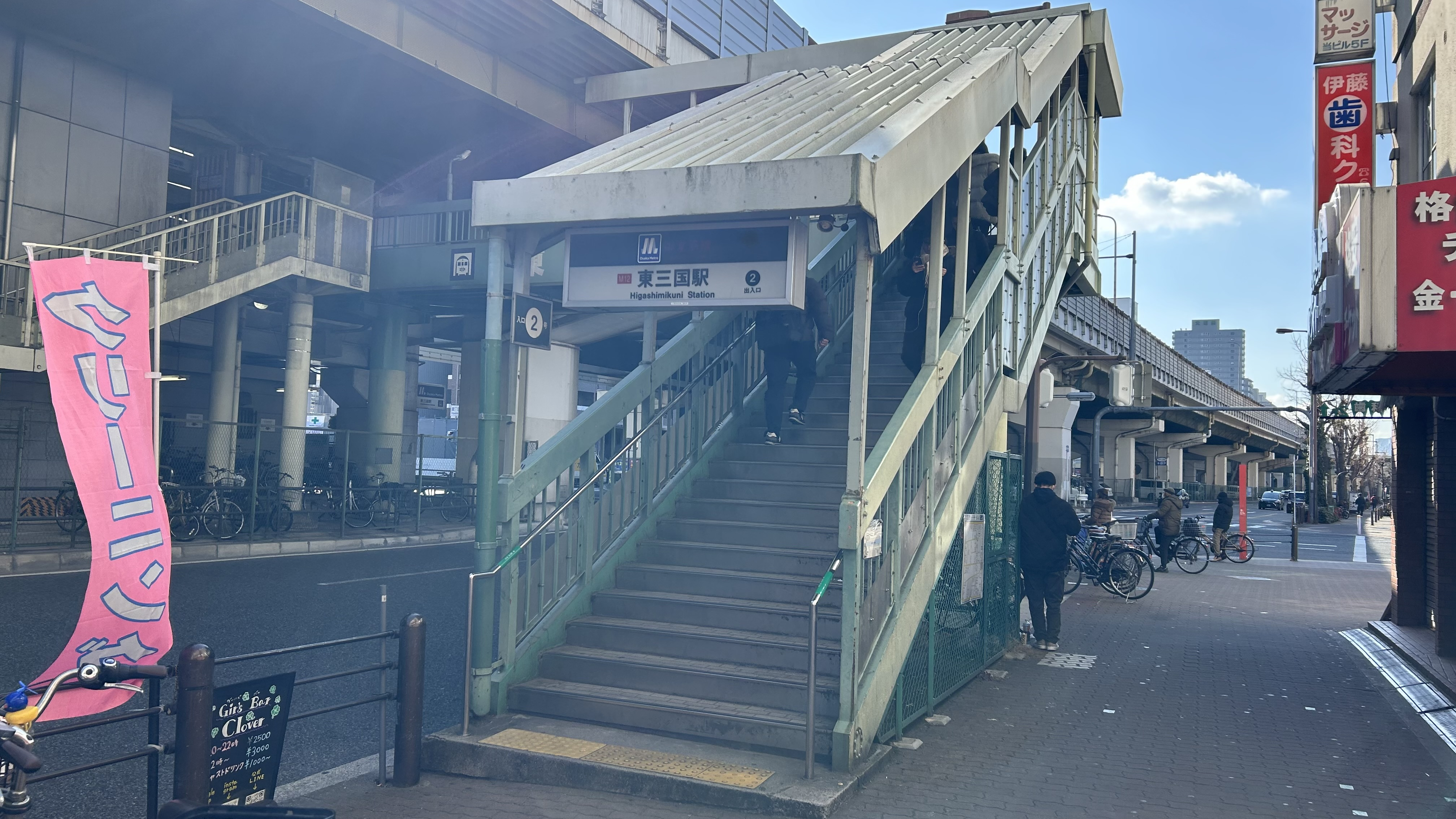
- Station building

General information
- System: Osaka Metro station
- Operator: Osaka Metro
- Line: Midōsuji Line
- Platforms: 1 island platform
- Tracks: 2

Construction
- Structure type: Elevated

Other information
- Station code: M 12
- Website: Official website

History
- Opened: 24 February 1970; 56 years ago

Services
Preceding station	Osaka Metro	Following station
Esaka M 11 Terminus	Midōsuji Line	Shin-Ōsaka M 13 towards Nakamozu
Location
- Location within Osaka Prefecture Location within Japan

Higashi-Mikuni (東三国駅, Higashi-Mikuni-eki; station number: M12) is a metro station on the Osaka Metro Midosuji Line located in Yodogawa-ku, Osaka, Japan.

== Layout ==
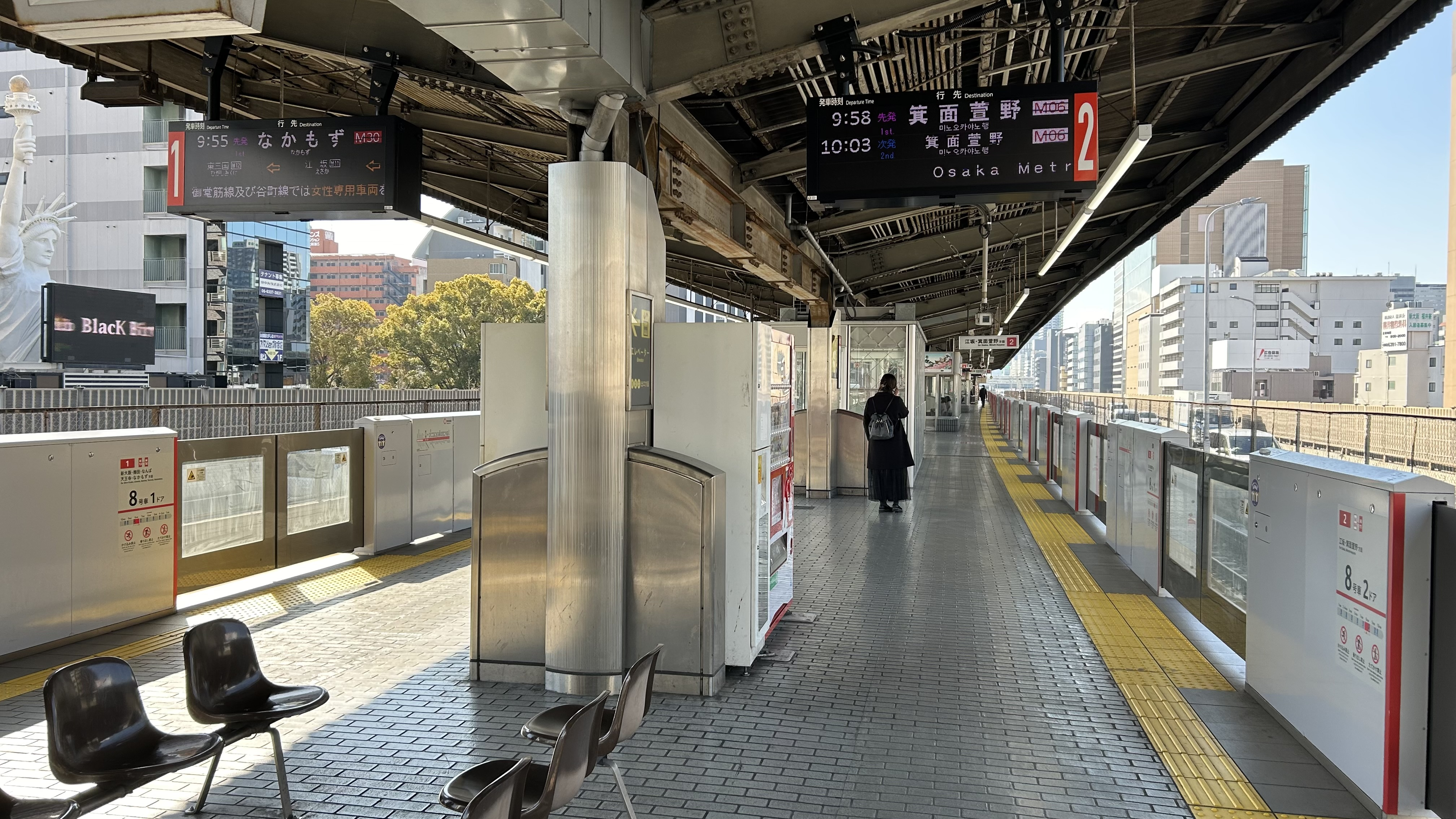
Station platform

There is an island platform serving two tracks elevated.

1	■ Midōsuji Line	for Shin-Osaka, Umeda, Namba, Tennoji and Nakamozu
2	■ Midōsuji Line	for Esaka and Minoh-kayano

== Passenger statistics ==
In fiscal 2022, the station was used by an average of 16,126 passengers daily (boarding passengers only).
