= Kita-Osaka Kyuko Railway =

Japanese railway company

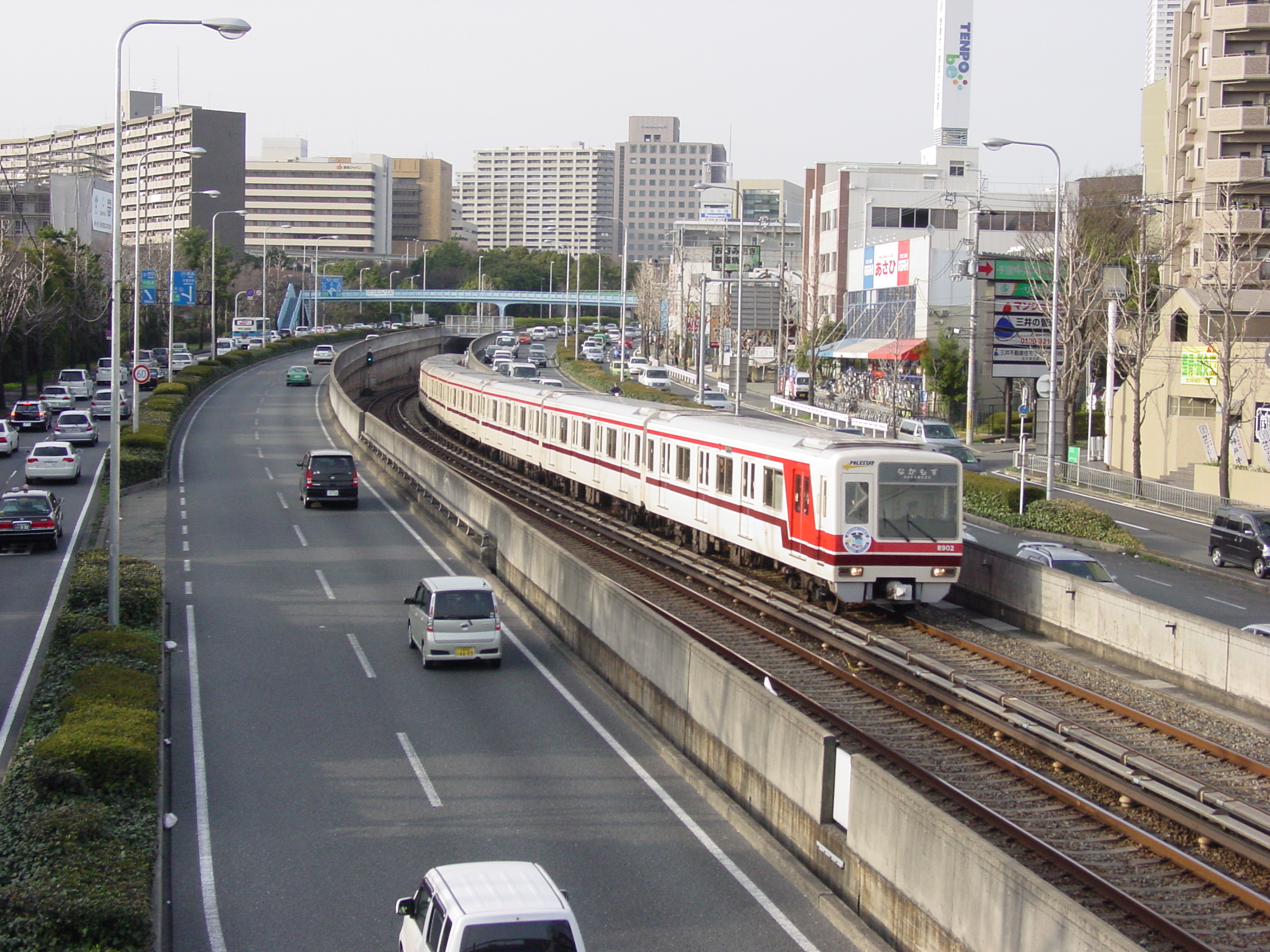
- Kita-Osaka Kyuko 8000 series train (between Momoyamadai Station and Senri-Chūō Station)

Overview
- Parent company: Hankyu (54%) (Hankyu Hanshin Toho Group) Osaka Prefecture (25%)
- Headquarters: Toyonaka, Osaka, Japan
- Locale: Osaka Prefecture, Japan
- Dates of operation: 1967 (incorporation); 1970 (opening)–

Technical
- Track gauge: 1,435 mm (4 ft 8 1/2 in)
- Length: 8.4 km (5.2 mi)

Other
- Website: www.kita-kyu.co.jp

Kita-Osaka Kyuko Railway (北大阪急行電鉄, Kita Ōsaka Kyūkō Dentetsu; lit. "North Osaka Express Electric Railway"), abbreviated as Kitakyu, is a third-sector railway operator in Osaka Prefecture, Japan. Its sole line, the Namboku Line (南北線, Nanboku-sen), operates as a through service extension of Osaka Metro's Midōsuji Line.

A majority (54%) of the company is owned by Hankyu Corporation, part of the Hankyu Hanshin Toho Group; an additional 25% is owned by Osaka Prefecture. The company also owns various commercial and residential properties along the line. It should not be confused with the former Kita-Osaka Electric Railway, which operated a section of the Hankyu Senri Line (between Awaji and Senriyama) and Hankyu Kyoto Main Line (between Jūsō and Awaji) from 1919 until 1928, when it was merged into Keihan Electric Railway.

== Stations ==
No.	Station	Japanese	Distance (km)	Transfers	Location
M06	Minoh-kayano	箕面萱野	0.0		Minoh
M07	Minoh-semba handai-mae	箕面船場阪大前	1.1		Minoh
M08	Senri-Chūō	千里中央	2.5	Osaka Monorail Main Line	Toyonaka
M09	Momoyamadai	桃山台	4.5		Suita
M10	Ryokuchi-kōen	緑地公園	6.5		Toyonaka
M11	Esaka	江坂	8.4	Osaka Metro Midōsuji Line (through service)	Suita
↓ Through services to/from Nakamozu via the Midōsuji Line ↓

=== Former line ===
- Kaijō Line (Senri-Chūō – Expo Main Gate)

== Rolling stock ==
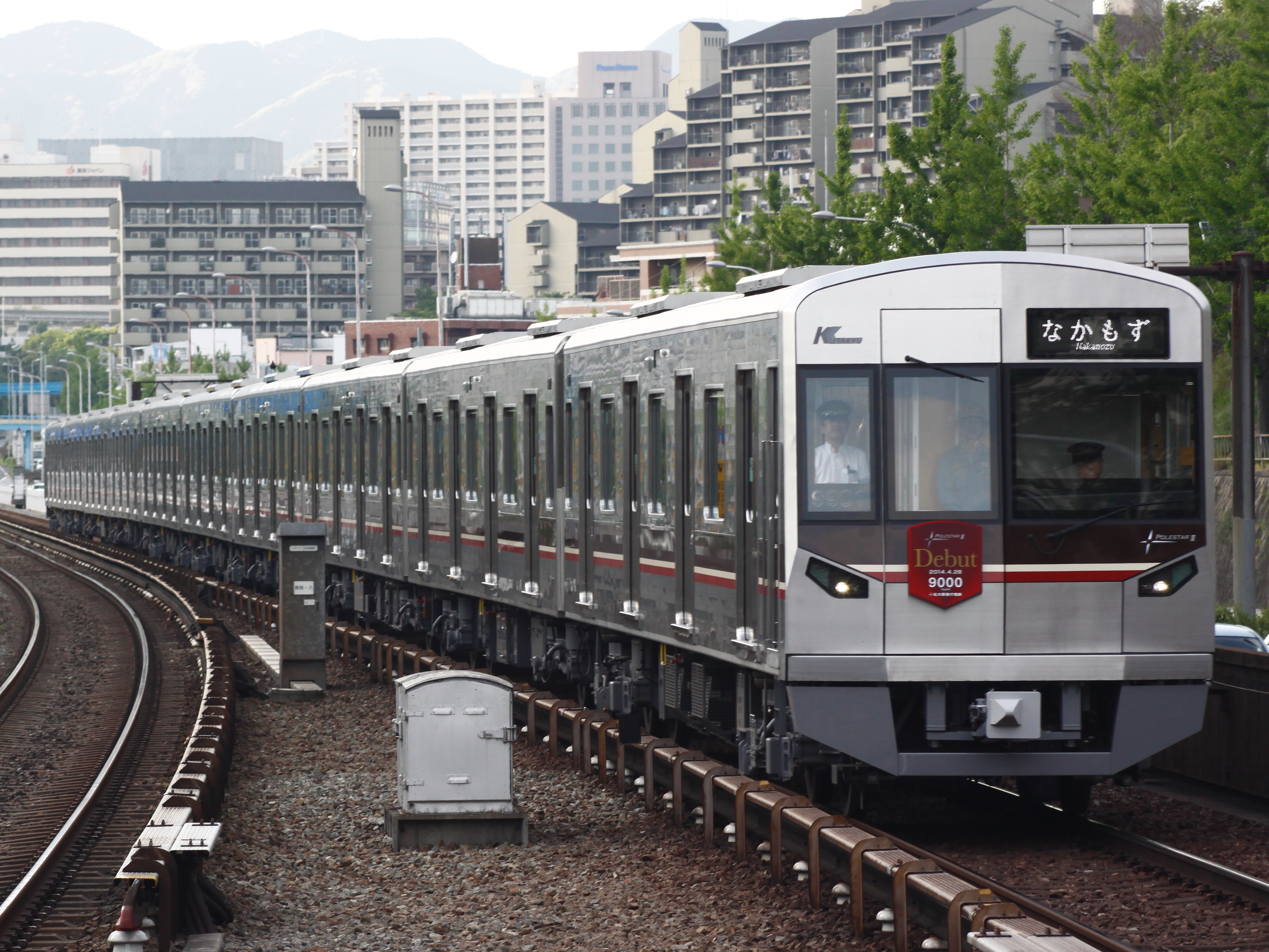
Kita-Osaka Kyuko 9000 series train (between Momoyamadai Station and Senri-Chūō Station)

All Kita-Osaka Kyuko rolling stock are stored and maintained at Momoyamadai Depot.

- 8000 series (since 1987)
- 9000 series (since 28 April 2014)

=== Former rolling stock ===
- 2000 series (from 1969 until 1993)
- 7000/8000 series (from 1969 until 1970)

== History ==
Planning for the Kita-Osaka Kyuko Railway began on 23 May 1966 as part of preparatory works for the 1970 World's Fair. Although the line was originally envisioned as a straightforward extension of the Midōsuji Line, the city government was unable to independently build and complete the extension because it went beyond municipal boundaries, thus raising issues of expropriation and financing. The Kita-Osaka Kyuko Railway Company was established on 11 December 1967 under the Local Railway Act as a result of the efforts of Takeo Miki, then Minister of International Trade and Industry, who brokered the deal creating said company as a joint venture between the City of Osaka and Hankyu Railway.

The line began construction on 16 July 1968 and was opened on 24 February 1970, to connect the then northern terminus of the Midōsuji Line, Esaka, with the grounds of the 1970 World's Fair. The Expo link was closed on 14 September, and the line was redirected to the new underground terminal station of Senri-Chūō. The temporary tracks between Senri-Chūō and the Expo Park were removed following the Expo, and the right-of-way repurposed as part of the Chugoku Expressway.

A plan to extend the line 2.5 km (1.6 mi) northward from Senri-Chuo to the city of Minoh was proposed in 1989. The Minoh municipal government exchanged a letter of confirmation with Hankyu and Kitakyu regarding studies of the extension in 2011, and the government of Osaka Prefecture joined a four-party memorandum of understanding in 2012.

On 19 January 2017, construction began on the extension of the line to Minō-Kayano, which will have one intermediate station at Minō-Semba-Handaimae. Completion of the extension was originally scheduled for 2020; in May 2019, the extension's scheduled opening date was delayed to 2023 because of construction problems. The scheduled opening of the extension was set for the end of 2023, but was later pushed back further to 23 March 2024.
