= Kita-Osaka Kyuko 8000 series =

Japanese train type

Kita-Osaka Kyuko 8000 series Polestar
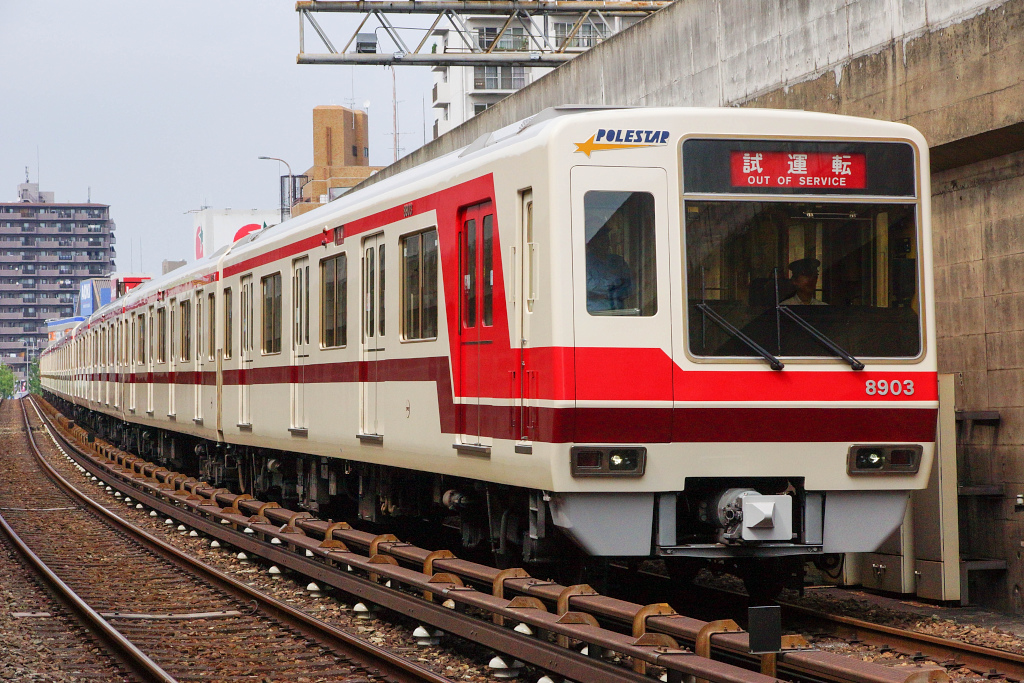
- A refurbished 8000 series set, August 2013
- In service: 1986–present
- Manufacturer: Alna Kōki
- Replaced: 2000 series
- Constructed: 1986–1993 (9-car sets), 1995–1996 (additional 10th cars)
- Entered service: 1 July 1986
- Refurbished: 2012, 2014–2015, 2018–
- Scrapped: 2014–
- Number built: 70 vehicles (7 sets)
- Number in service: 30 vehicles (3 sets)
- Number preserved: 2 vehicles and 1 cab end
- Number scrapped: 37 vehicles (4 sets)
- Successor: 9000 series
- Formation: 10 (previously 9, orig. 8) cars per trainset
- Fleet numbers: 8001–8007
- Capacity: 1,280 per set
- Operator: Kita-Osaka Kyuko Railway
- Depot: Momoyamadai Depot
- Lines served: Namboku Line; Midōsuji Line

Specifications
- Car body construction: Aluminium
- Width: 2,890 mm (9 ft 6 in)
- Height: 3,745 mm (12 ft 3.4 in)
- Doors: 4 pairs per side
- Maximum speed: 70 km/h (43 mph)
- Traction system: Variable-frequency (GTO)
- Acceleration: 3.0 km/(h⋅s) (1.9 mph/s)
- Deceleration: 3.5 km/(h⋅s) (2.2 mph/s) (service); 4.5 km/(h⋅s) (2.8 mph/s) (emergency)
- Electric system: 750 V DC
- Current collection: Third rail
- Safety system: WS-ATC
- Track gauge: 1,435 mm (4 ft 8 1/2 in)

The Kita-Osaka Kyuko 8000 series (北大阪急行電鉄8000形), branded as Polestar, is an electric multiple unit (EMU) train type operated by Kita-Osaka Kyuko Railway on the Kitakyū Namboku Line in north Osaka since 1986, with through service to the Osaka Metro Midōsuji Line.

== Design ==
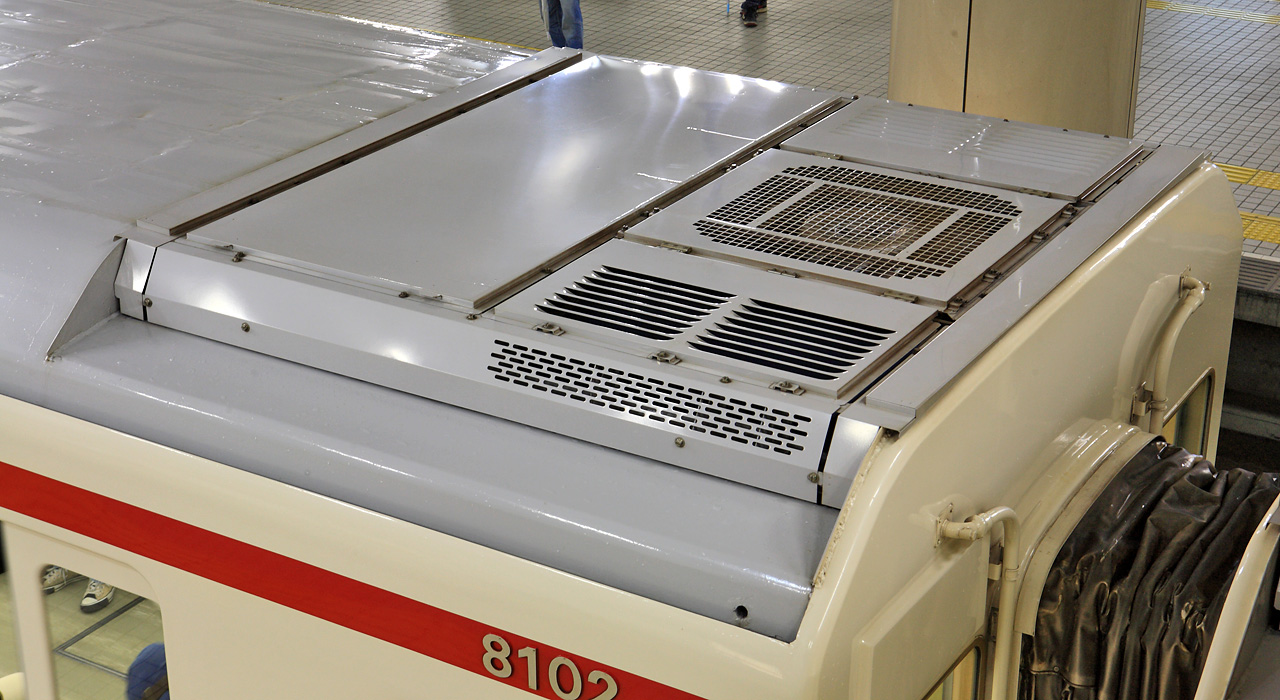
Rooftop AC condenser unit of Kitakyū 8000 series, April 2008

The 8000 series was introduced in 1986 to replace ageing rolling stock which were mostly derived from Osaka Municipal Subway rolling stock. It was also the first Kitakyū rolling stock type to feature air conditioning in the passenger interiors and driver cabs. It was also one of the three recipients of the 27th Laurel Prize of the Japan Railfan Club.

== Formation ==
As of 1 April 2015, five out of the original seven 10-car sets were in service, formed as shown below, with five motored ("M") cars and five non-powered trailer ("T") cars, and car 1 at the Senri-Chuo end.

Car No.	1	2	3	4	5	6	7	8	9	10
Designation	Tc1	M0	Te	M1	M2'	Te'	T	M1	M2	Tc2
Numbering	800x	810x	820x	830x	840x	850x	860x	870x	880x	890x

Each car includes a wheelchair space.

== History ==
The first train, set 8001, was introduced on 1 July 1986. The 8000 series trains initially operated as 8-car sets before they were lengthened to nine-car sets from 1987 and subsequently ten-car sets from 1995.

Withdrawals commenced in 2014, with 8002 in August 2014, and set 8004 in February 2015. Set 8001 carried a special headboard from late February 2016 to mark its scheduled withdrawn in March 2016. As of 2026, sets 8003, 8006 and 8007 remain in service.

On 14 April 2026, Kita-Osaka Kyuko Railway announced plans to retire set 8003 in January 2027 and gradually phase out sets 8006 and 8007 thereafter.

== Preserved examples ==
- 8001 + 8901 cab end: Momoyamadai Depot, Osaka
- 8005: Privately preserved in Tamba-Sasayama, Hyōgo.
