= Midōsuji Line =

Metro line in Osaka Prefecture, Japan

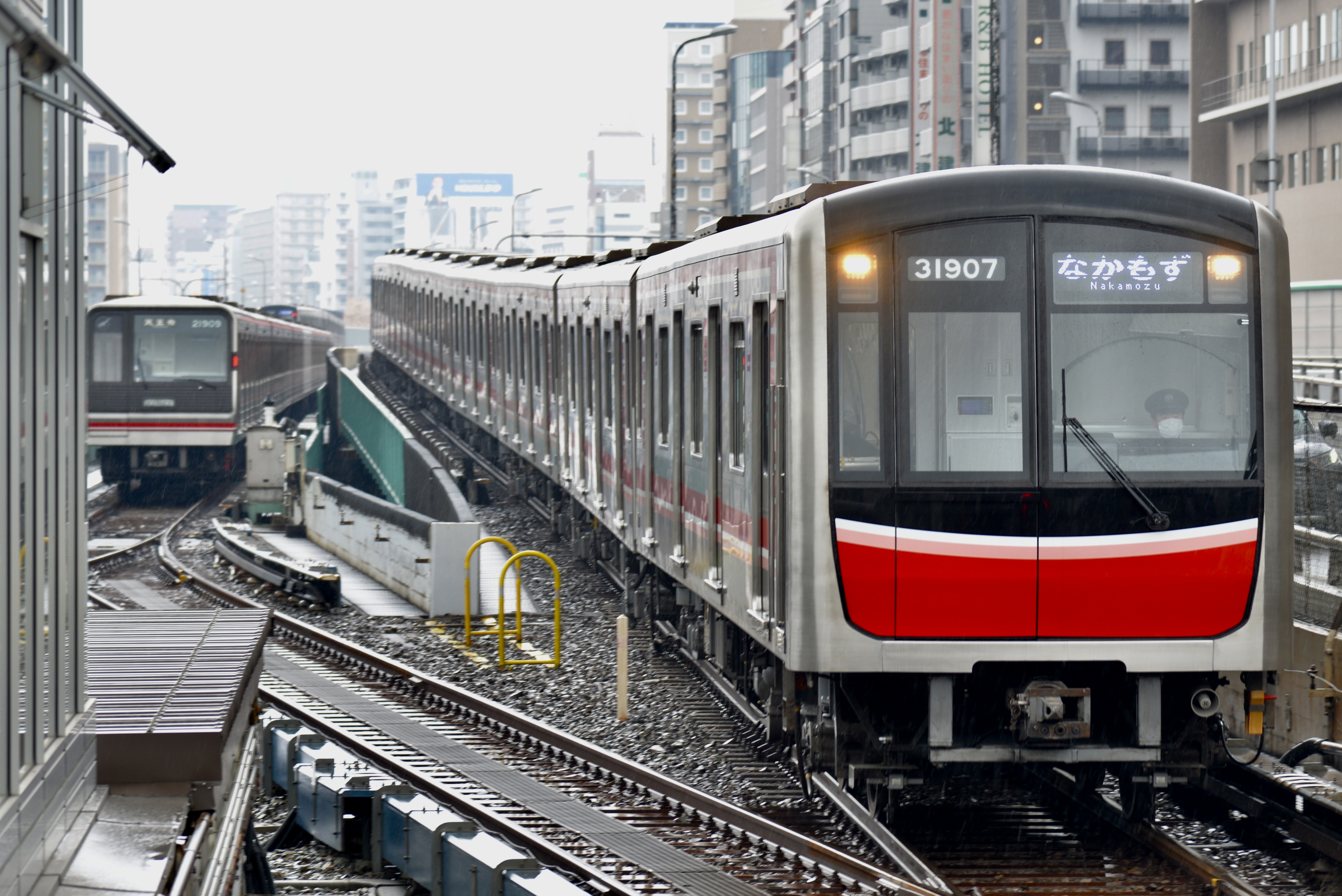
- A Midōsuji Line 30000 series (right) and 21 series (left) train at Shin-Osaka Station in September 2021

Overview
- Owner: Osaka Metro Co., Ltd. (2018–present); Osaka Municipal Transportation Bureau (1933–2018)
- Line number: 1
- Locale: Osaka Prefecture
- Termini: Esaka; Nakamozu
- Stations: 20
- Color on map: Crimson red (#E5171F)

Service
- Type: Rapid transit
- System: Osaka Metro
- Depot(s): Nagai, Nakamozu
- Rolling stock: 21 series; 30000 series
- Daily ridership: 1,295,420 (daily 2015)

History
- Opened: May 20, 1933; 93 years ago
- Last extension: 1987

Technical
- Line length: 24.5 km (15.2 mi)
- Track length: 24.5 km (15.2 mi)
- Num of tracks: Double-track
- Track gauge: 1,435 mm (4 ft 8 1/2 in) standard gauge
- Electrification: 750 V DC (third rail)
- Operating speed: 70 km/h (43 mph)
- Signalling: Automatic closed block
- Train protection system: WS-ATC, TASC
Route map

The Midōsuji Line (御堂筋線, Midōsuji-sen) is a rapid transit line in Osaka, Japan, operated by Osaka Metro. Constructed under Midōsuji, a major north-south street, it is the oldest line in the Osaka subway system and the second oldest in Japan, following the Tokyo Metro Ginza Line. Its official name is Rapid Electric Tramway Line No. 1 (高速電気軌道第1号線), while the Osaka Municipal Transportation Bureau refers to it as Osaka City Rapid Railway Line No. 1 (大阪市高速鉄道第1号線), and in MLIT publications it is referred to as Line No. 1 (Midōsuji Line) (1号線（御堂筋線）). On line maps, stations on the Midōsuji Line are indicated with the letter "M".

North of Nakatsu it runs above ground in the median of Shin-midōsuji, an elevated freeway.

The section between Minoh-kayano and Esaka is owned and operated by Kita-Osaka Kyuko Railway (北大阪急行電鉄, Kita Osaka Dentetsu), but is seamless to the passengers except with respect to fare calculations.

In June 2018, the Midōsuji Line is the most congested railway line in the Kansai region of Japan, at its peak running at 151% capacity between Umeda and Yodoyabashi stations.

== History ==
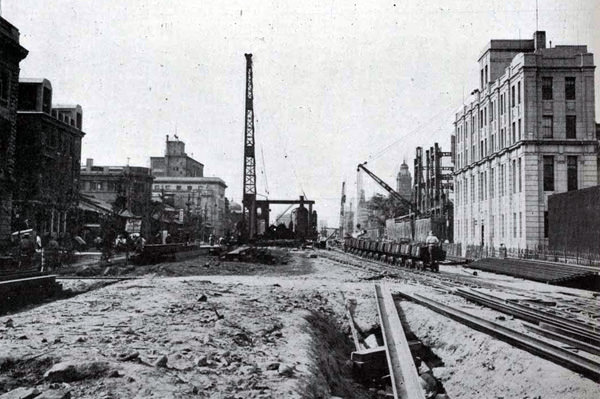
Construction of the Midosuji line (circa 1930)

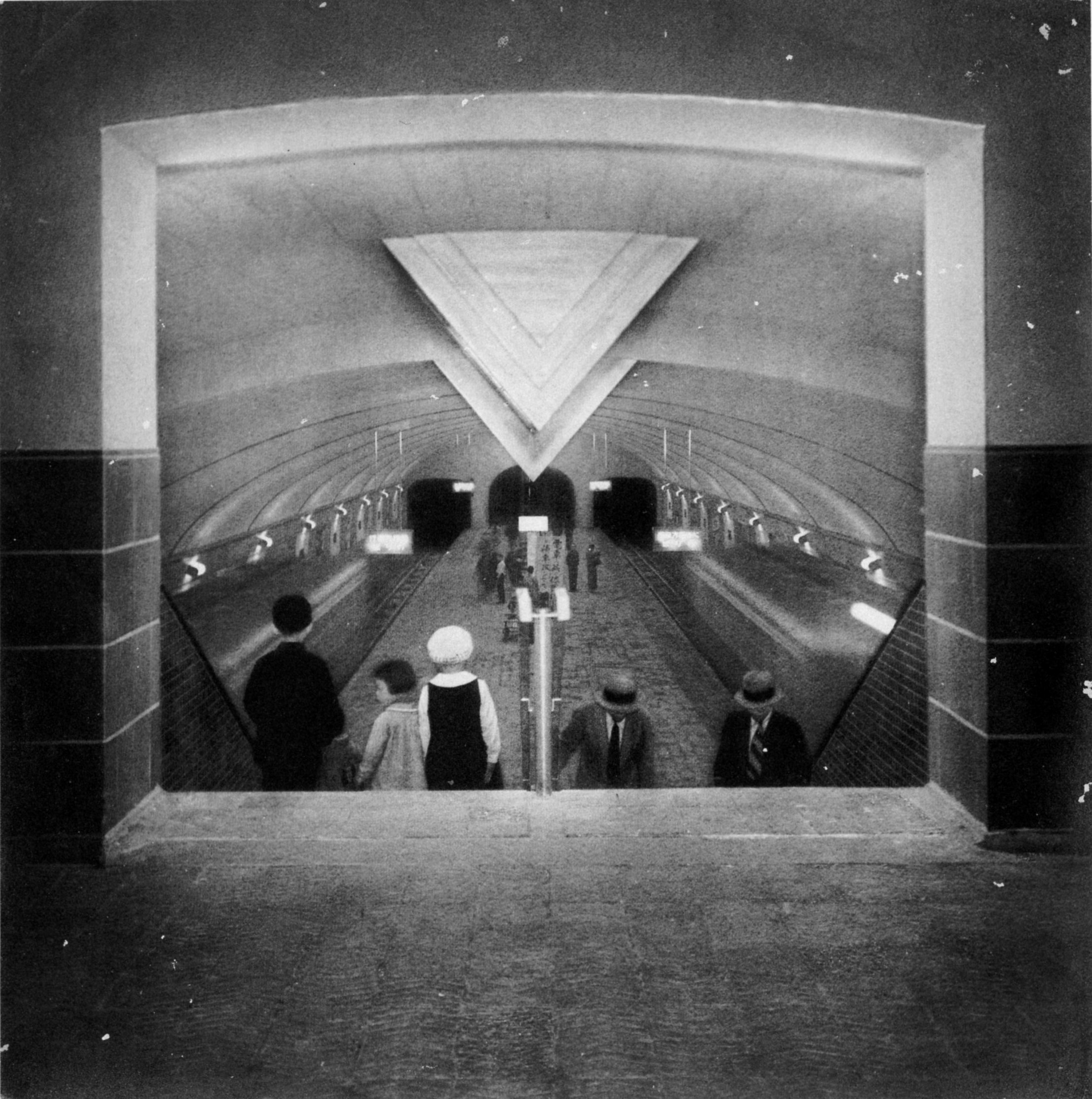
Midōsuji Line Yodoyabashi Station in 1933

The Midōsuji Line was the first subway line in Osaka, the first government-operated subway line in Japan, and the second subway line built in Japan after the Tokyo Underground Railway (Ginza Line); the two lines are the only Japanese subway lines that predate World War II.

Its construction was partly an effort to give work to the many unemployed people in Osaka during the Great Depression. The initial tunnel from Umeda to Shinsaibashi, as well as the Umeda depot, were constructed entirely by hand. Poor engineering led to the collapse of Umeda Station and several other buildings along the route. The initial tunnel also had to traverse three major canals: the Tosabori, Nagahori, and Dotonbori. The first cars were hauled onto the line by manpower and oxen from the Government Railway tracks near Umeda.

Although the line only operated with single cars at first, its stations were designed from the outset to handle trains of up to eight cars. The line was gradually extended over the next few decades, completing its current length in 1987, making it the second-longest subway line in Osaka after the Tanimachi Line (excluding the Kita-Osaka Kyūkō Railway extension of the Midōsuji Line).

- May 20, 1933 – Umeda (temporary station) – Shinsaibashi (opening). Trains started running in single car formation on a single track.
- October 6, 1935 – Umeda Station (present station) opened. Trains started running on two tracks.
- October 30, 1935 – Shinsaibashi – Namba (opening). Trains started running in 2-car formation.
- April 21, 1938 – Namba – Tennōji (opening). Trains started running in 3-car formation.

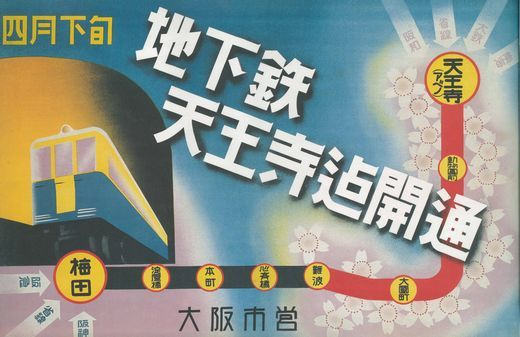
Poster for the extension and opening of Osaka Municipal Subway Tennōji Station in 1938

Construction of an extension from Tennoji began in 1938, but stopped in 1943 during World War II, and did not resume until 1950. Financial constraints led to the remainder of the section being built as an open trench; it was later covered by a roadway in 1958.

- December 20, 1951 – Tennōji – Shōwachō (opening)
- October 5, 1952 – Shōwachō – Nishitanabe (opening)
- August 1, 1953 – Trains started running in 4-car formation.
- April 1, 1957 – Trains started running in 5-car formation.
- May 1, 1958 – Trains started running in 6-car formation.
- July 1, 1960 – Nishitanabe – Abiko (opening)
- June 1, 1963 – Trains started running in 8-car formation.
- 1963 – Highest-ever crush load capacity on the Midōsuji Line recorded at 264% on the Namba – Shinsaibashi section.
- September 1, 1964 – Umeda – Shin-Osaka (opening)
- August 29, 1968 – 30 series EMUs began operation.
- February 24, 1970 – Shin-Osaka – Esaka together with Kita-Osaka Kyuko Railway (Kitakyu) (opening). Automatic Train Control and cab signalling replaced the previous mechanical Automatic Train Stop train protection system.
- April 1, 1971 – Centralized traffic control introduced.
- February 16, 1976 – 10 series EMUs begin operation.
- April 18, 1987 – Abiko – Nakamozu (opening). Refurbishment of stations to accommodate 9-car trainsets began.
- August 24, 1987, Refurbishment of stations complete, hence all trains were regrouped into 9-car formation.
- May 14, 1991 – 21 series EMUs begin operation.
- 1993 – All trains on the Midōsuji Line are fully air-conditioned after the withdrawal of the 30 series and the Kitakyū 2000 series the same year.
- December 9, 1995 – Refurbishment of stations to accommodate 10-car trainsets began.
- September 1, 1996 – Refurbishment of stations completed, hence all trains were regrouped into 10-car formation.
- November 11, 2002 – Women-only cars were introduced.
- December 2011 – 30000 series EMUs entered service.
- February 14, 2015 – First half-height platform screen doors installed at Tennōji Station.
- March 27, 2020 – First three sets of 30000 series EMUs equipped with on-board Wi-Fi.
- 2021 – TASC implemented on the Midōsuji Line.
- March 5, 2022 – Platform screen doors retrofit work completed on the Midōsuji Line.
- July 4, 2022 – Last 10 series EMU retired from service.

== Line data ==
- Above-ground section: north of Nakatsu to Esaka; Esaka to south of Senri-Chūō; (Kita-Osaka Kyuko Railway)
- Block signalling: Automatic
- Train protection system: WS-ATC
- Cars per train: 10 (1996 – present)
- Stations equipped with platform screen doors: all

== Stations ==
All stations are located within Osaka Prefecture.

No.	Station	Japanese	Distance	Transfers	Location
↑ Through services to/from Minoh-kayano via the Kita-Osaka Kyuko Railway ↑
M 11	Esaka	江坂	0.0	Kita-Osaka Kyuko Railway (through service)	Suita
M 12	Higashi-Mikuni	東三国	2.0		Yodogawa-ku, Osaka
M 13	Shin-Ōsaka	新大阪	2.9	Tokaido Shinkansen; San'yō Shinkansen; A JR Kyōto Line (Tōkaidō Main Line) (JR-A46); F Osaka Higashi Line (JR-F02)	Yodogawa-ku, Osaka
M 14	Nishinakajima- Minamigata	西中島南方	3.6	Hankyu Kyoto Main Line (HK-61)	Yodogawa-ku, Osaka
M 15	Nakatsu	中津	5.4		Kita-ku, Osaka
M 16	Umeda	梅田	6.4	Tanimachi Line (T20); Yotsubashi Line (Y11); JR West – Ōsaka: A JR Kyoto Line (JR-A47); A JR Kōbe Line (JR-A47); G JR Takarazuka Line (JR-G47); F Osaka Higashi Line (JR-F01); O Osaka Loop Line (JR-O11); H JR Tōzai Line (JR-H44: Kitashinchi); Hankyu (HK-01): Hankyu Kobe Line; Hankyu Takarazuka Line; Hankyu Kyoto Main Line; Hanshin (HS-01): Hanshin Main Line	Kita-ku, Osaka
M 17	Yodoyabashi (Osaka City Hall)	淀屋橋 （市役所前）	7.7	Keihan Main Line (KH01); Keihan Nakanoshima Line (KH52: Oebashi)	Chūō-ku, Osaka
M 18	Hommachi (Semba-nishi)	本町 （船場西）	8.6	Chūō Line (C16); Yotsubashi Line (Y13)	Chūō-ku, Osaka
M 19	Shinsaibashi	心斎橋	9.6	Nagahori Tsurumi-ryokuchi Line (N15)	Chūō-ku, Osaka
M 20	Namba	難波・なんば	10.5	Sennichimae Line (S16); Yotsubashi Line (Y15); Nankai (NK01): Nankai Main Line; Nankai Koya Line; A Kintetsu Namba Line (A01); Hanshin Namba Line (HS41); Q Yamatoji Line (V Kansai Line) (JR-Q17)	Chūō-ku, Osaka
M 21	Daikokuchō	大国町	11.7	Yotsubashi Line (Y16)	Naniwa-ku, Osaka
M 22	Dōbutsuen-mae (Shinsekai)	動物園前 （新世界）	12.9	Sakaisuji Line (K19); JR West – Shin-Imamiya; O Osaka Loop Line (JR-O19); Q Yamatoji Line (V Kansai Main Line) (JR-Q19); Nankai (NK03: Shin-Imamiya); Nankai Main Line; Nankai Koya Line; Hankai Line (HN52: Shin-Imamiya)	Nishinari-ku, Osaka
M 23	Tennōji	天王寺	13.9	Tanimachi Line (T27); O Osaka Loop Line (JR-O01); Q Yamatoji Line (V Kansai Main Line) (JR-Q20); R Hanwa Line (JR-R20); F Minami Osaka Line (F01: Osaka Abenobashi); Hankai Uemachi Line (HN01)	Abeno-ku, Osaka
M 24	Shōwachō	昭和町	15.7		Abeno-ku, Osaka
M 25	Nishitanabe	西田辺	17.0		Abeno-ku, Osaka
M 26	Nagai	長居	18.3	R Hanwa Line (JR-R24)	Sumiyoshi-ku, Osaka
M 27	Abiko	あびこ	19.5		Sumiyoshi-ku, Osaka
M 28	Kitahanada	北花田	21.4		Kita-ku, Sakai
M 29	Shinkanaoka	新金岡	23.0		Kita-ku, Sakai
M 30	Nakamozu	なかもず	24.5	Nankai (NK59): Nankai Koya Line; Nankai Semboku Line	Kita-ku, Sakai

== Fares and ticketing ==
Fares vary according to travel distance, ranging from 190 to 390 yen for adults and from 100 to 200 yen for children. As the distance increases, the fare rises in stages. Passengers also have the added option of using IC e-cards.

Distance	Adult	Children
Less than 3km	190 yen	100 yen
3km - 7km	240 yen	120 yen
7km - 13km	290 yen	150 yen
13km - 19km	340 yen	170 yen
Over 19km	390 yen	200 yen

Commuter passes come in the form of IC e-cards and can be purchased at Umeda station, Namba station, or Tennoji station at their respective sales counters or at the pink self-service machines in any station. Passes are available for 1-month, 3-month, and 6-month durations. Commuter pass prices vary depending on the duration and distance traveled in a designated route. Discounts are also available for students and children.

Standard commuter pass
Duration	Type	Less than 3km	3km - 7km	7km - 13km	13km - 19km	Over 19km
1 month	Adult	7,930 yen	9,480 yen	11,030 yen	11,830 yen	12,770 yen
1 month	Children	3,970 yen	4,740 yen	5,520 yen	5,920 yen	6,390 yen
3 month	Adult	22,610 yen	27,020 yen	31,440 yen	33,720 yen	36,400 yen
3 month	Children	11,310 yen	13,510 yen	15,720 yen	16,860 yen	18,200 yen
6 month	Adult	42,830 yen	51,200 yen	59,570 yen	63,890 yen	68,960 yen
6 month	Children	21,420 yen	25,600 yen	29,790 yen	31,950 yen	34,480 yen

Student commuter pass
Duration	Type	Less than 3km	3km - 7km	7km - 13km	13km - 19km	Over 19km
1 month	Adult	3,430 yen	4,200 yen	4,880 yen	4,980 yen	5,410 yen
1 month	Children	1,720 yen	2,100 yen	2,440 yen	2,490 yen	2,710 yen
3 month	Adult	9,780 yen	11,970 yen	13,910 yen	14,200 yen	15,420 yen
3 month	Children	4,890 yen	5,990 yen	6,960 yen	7,100 yen	7,710 yen
6 month	Adult	18,530 yen	22,680 yen	26,360 yen	26,900 yen	29,220 yen
6 month	Children	9,270 yen	11,340 yen	13,180 yen	13,450 yen	14,610 yen

== Passenger statistics ==
Station	Number of passengers (persons/day)
Umeda	376,997
Tennōji	230,570
Yodoyabashi	189,507
Honmachi	187,469
Shinsaibashi	128,279
Shin-Ōsaka	125,819
Esaka	93,022
Nishinakajima-Minamigata	56,702
Nakatsu	37,190
Higashi-Mikuni	32,031
Nagai	31,853
Daikokuchō	30,126
Dōbutsuen-mae	27,808
Shōwachō	23,891
Kitahanada	22,900
Nakamozu	21,343
Nishitanabe	21,264
Shinkanaoka	19,736

== Rolling stock ==
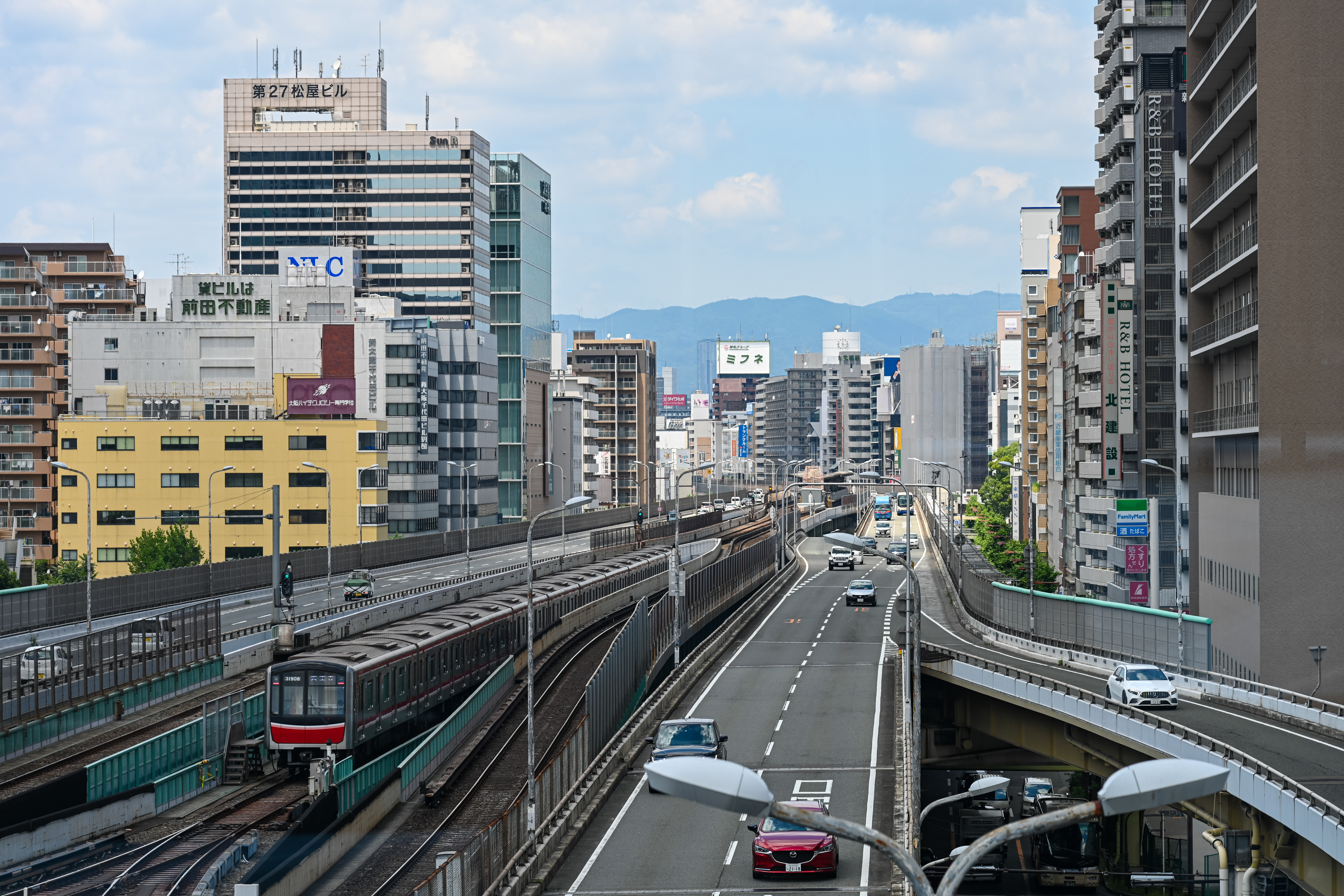
A 30000-series train stabled at the pocket track after Shin Osaka Station.

Since 1987, all Midōsuji Line rolling stock operated by Osaka Metro are stored and maintained at Nakamozu Depot, the first underground depot in the Osaka Metro system. The first depot for the Midōsuji Line was located near Umeda station, which was replaced by Abeno Depot in 1950, Nagai Depot in 1954 (now used mainly for maintenance-of-way vehicles), and Abiko Depot in 1960 (closed in 1987). Since 2016, it is also possible for Midōsuji Line rolling stock to access Midorigi Depot on the Yotsubashi Line via pointworks before Daikokuchō station, after heavier repairs and maintenance of all third-rail-powered Osaka Metro rolling stock were consolidated there.

- 21 series (since 1991)
- 30000 series (since December 10, 2011)
- Kita-Osaka Kyuko 8000 series (since 1987)
- Kita-Osaka Kyuko 9000 series (since April 28, 2014)
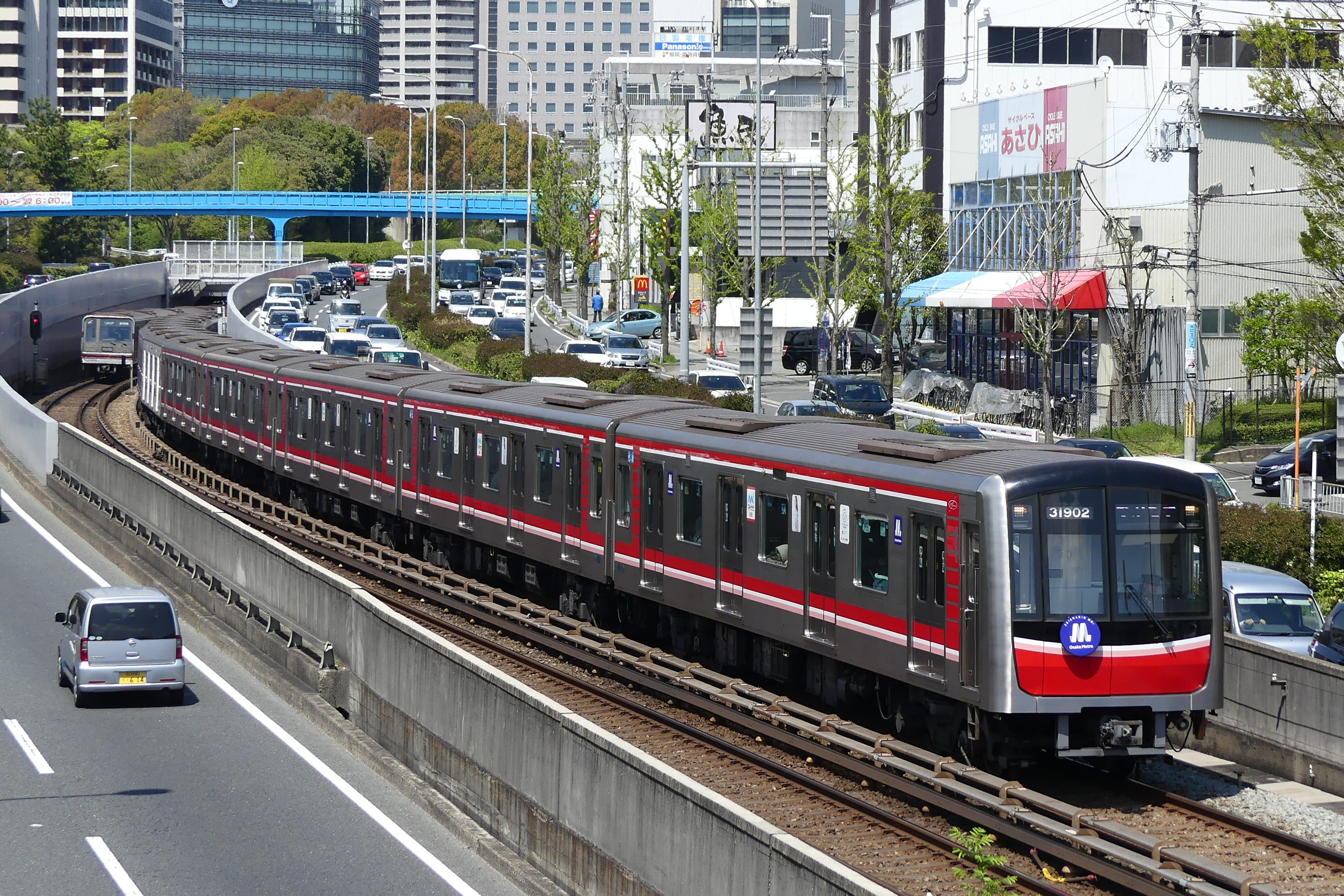
Midōsuji Line 30000 series set 31904 in April 2018

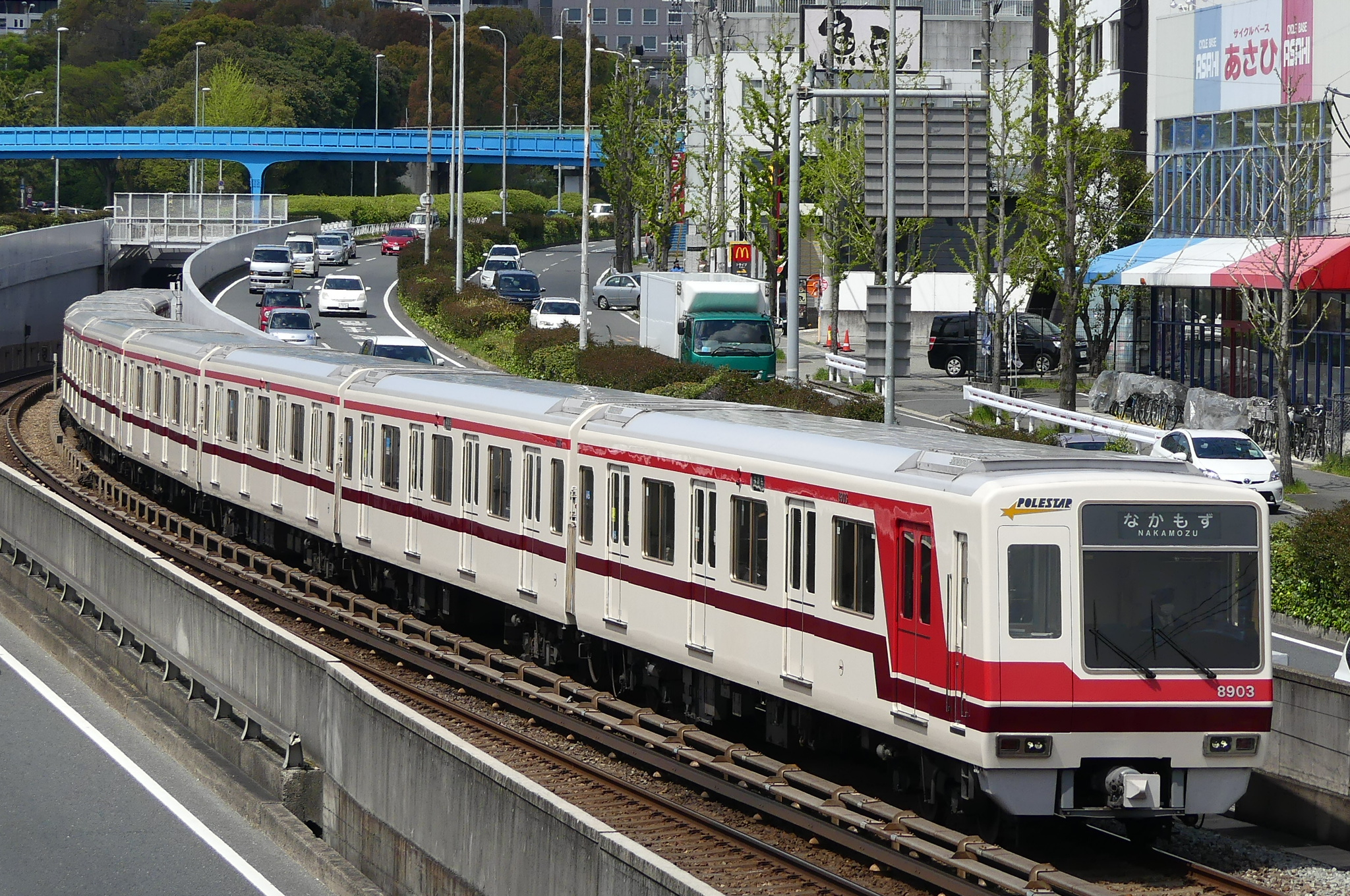
Kita-Osaka Kyuko 8000 series in April 2018

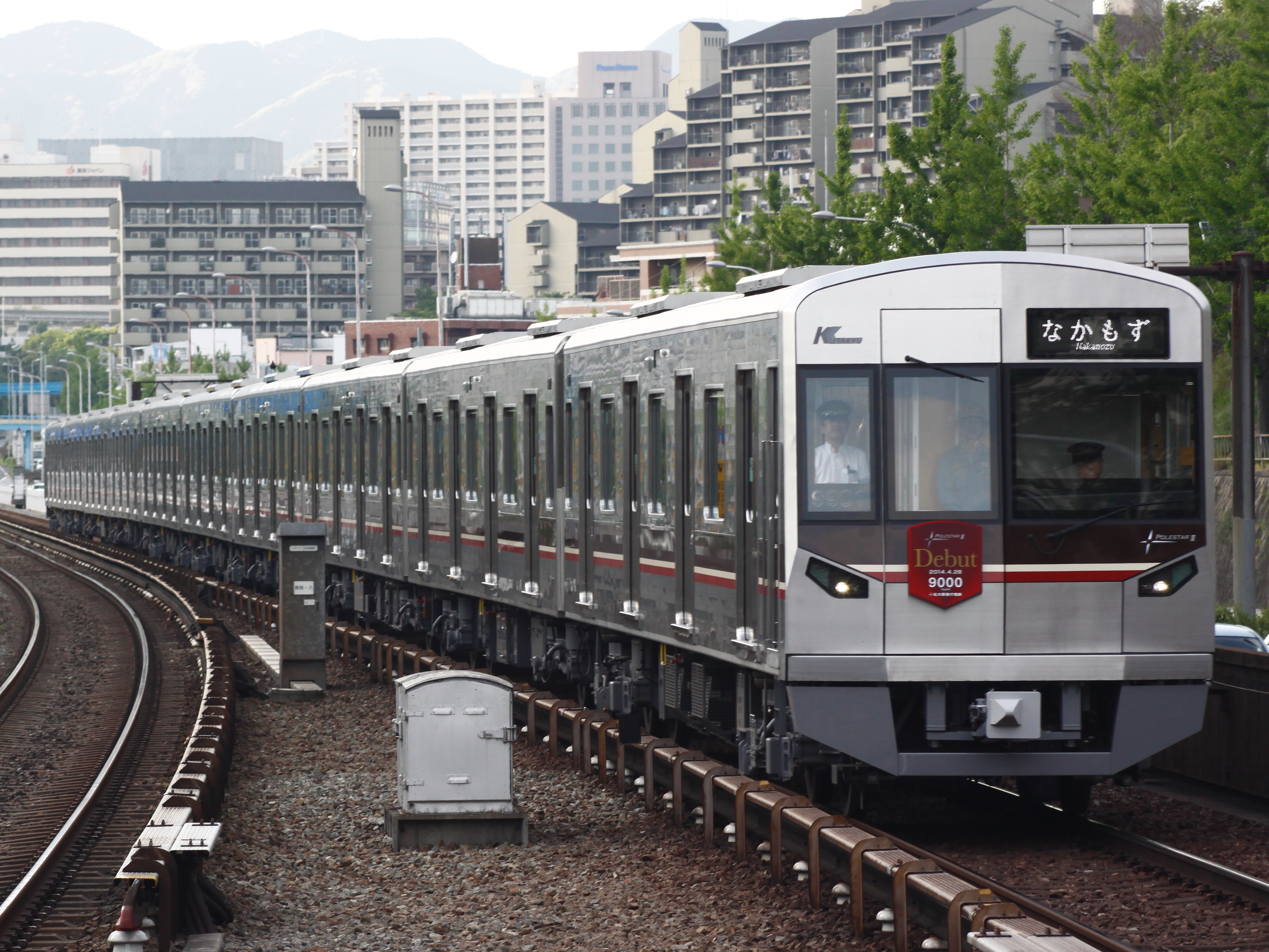
Kita-Osaka Kyuko 9000 series in May 2014

=== Former ===
- 100 series (1933–1969)
- 200 series (1935–1969)
- 300 series (1938–1969)
- 400 series (1943–1969)
- 500 series (1949–1969)
- 600 series (1951–1969)
- 1000 series (1953–1969)
- 1100 series (1957–1969)
- 1200 series (1958–1969)
- 50 series (1960–1969)
- 30 series (1968–1993)
- 10/10A series (1973–2022)
- Kitakyū 7000/8000 series (1969–1970)
- Kitakyū 2000 series (1969–1993)
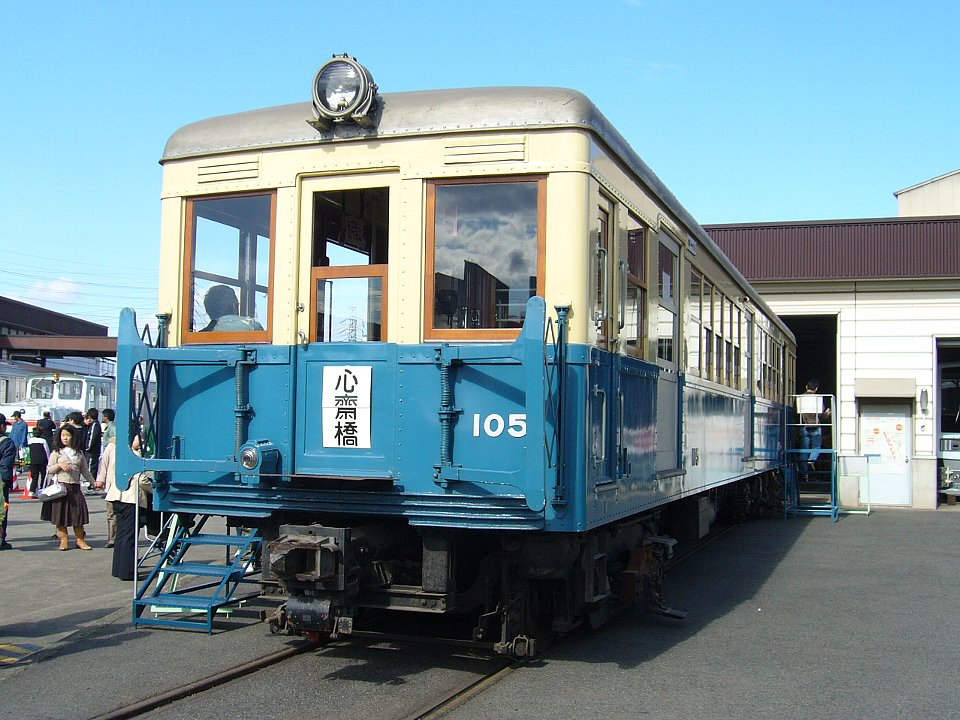
A preserved 100 series car, November 2006

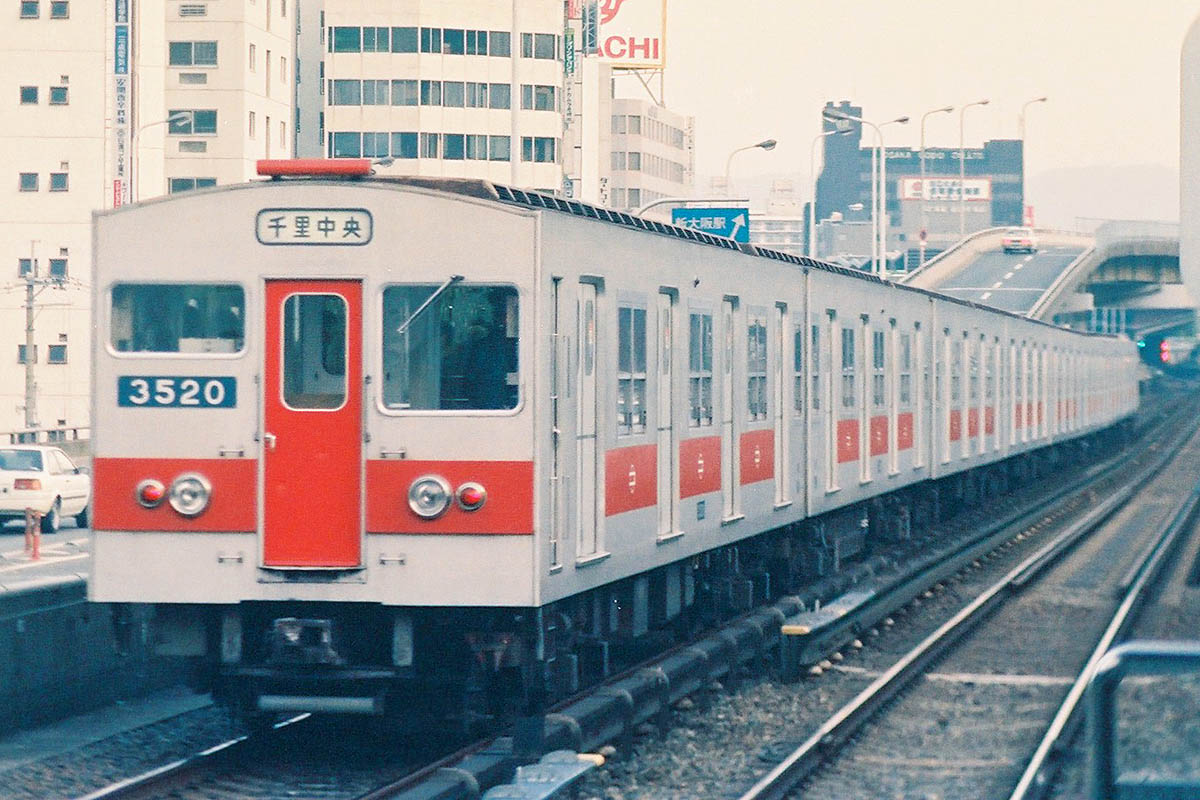
30 series on the Midōsuji Line, c.1987

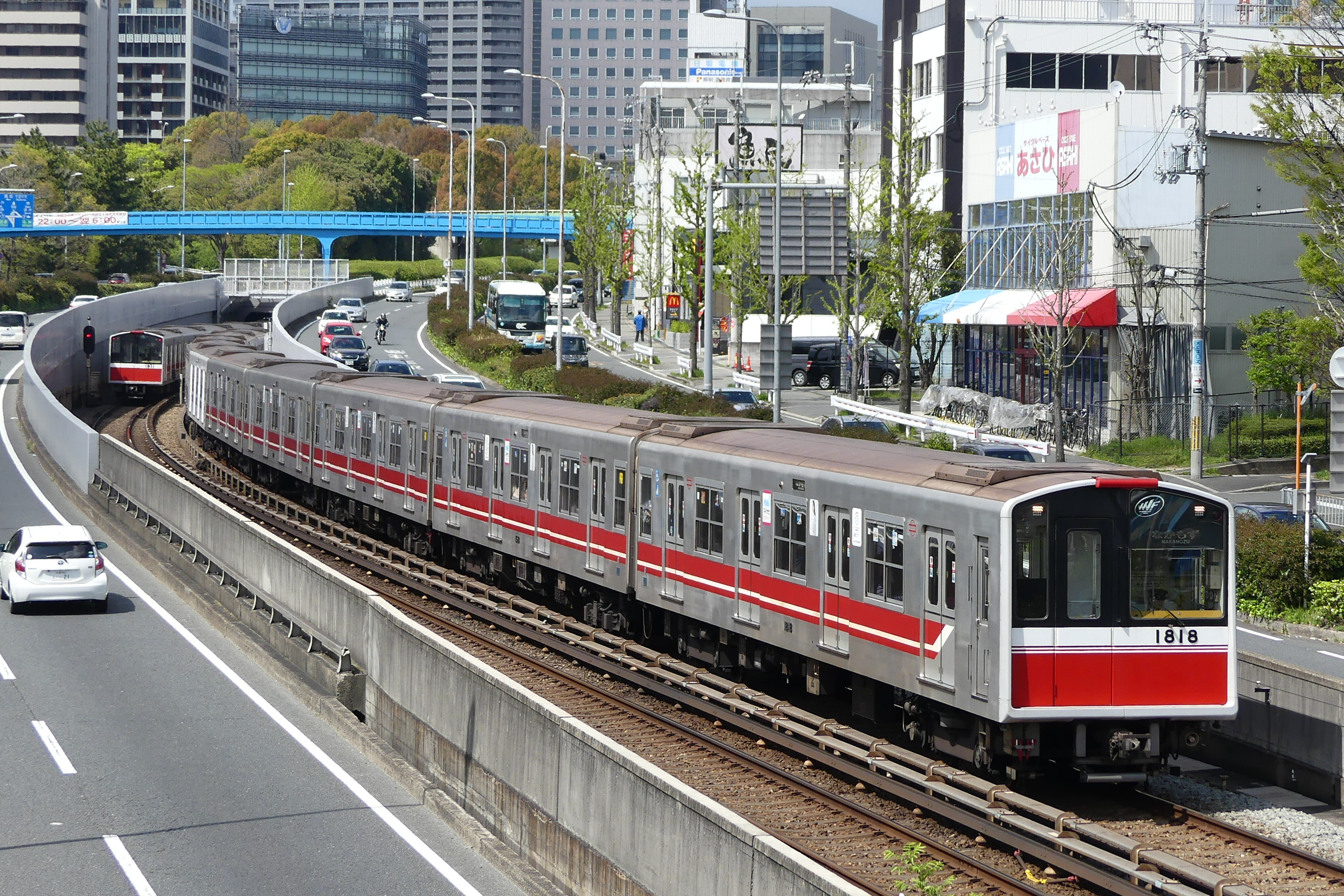
Midōsuji Line 10A series EMU in April 2018

=== Women-only passenger cars ===
Women-only cars were introduced on the line from November 11, 2002. There is one such designated car in each train (Car No. 6), the use of which is restricted all day on weekdays.

Women-only car
←Nakamozu	Esaka/Minoh-kayano→
1 / 2 / 3 / 4 / 5 / 6 / 7 / 8 / 9 / 10
