= Esaka Station =

Metro station in Suita, Osaka Prefecture, Japan

Esaka Station 江坂駅
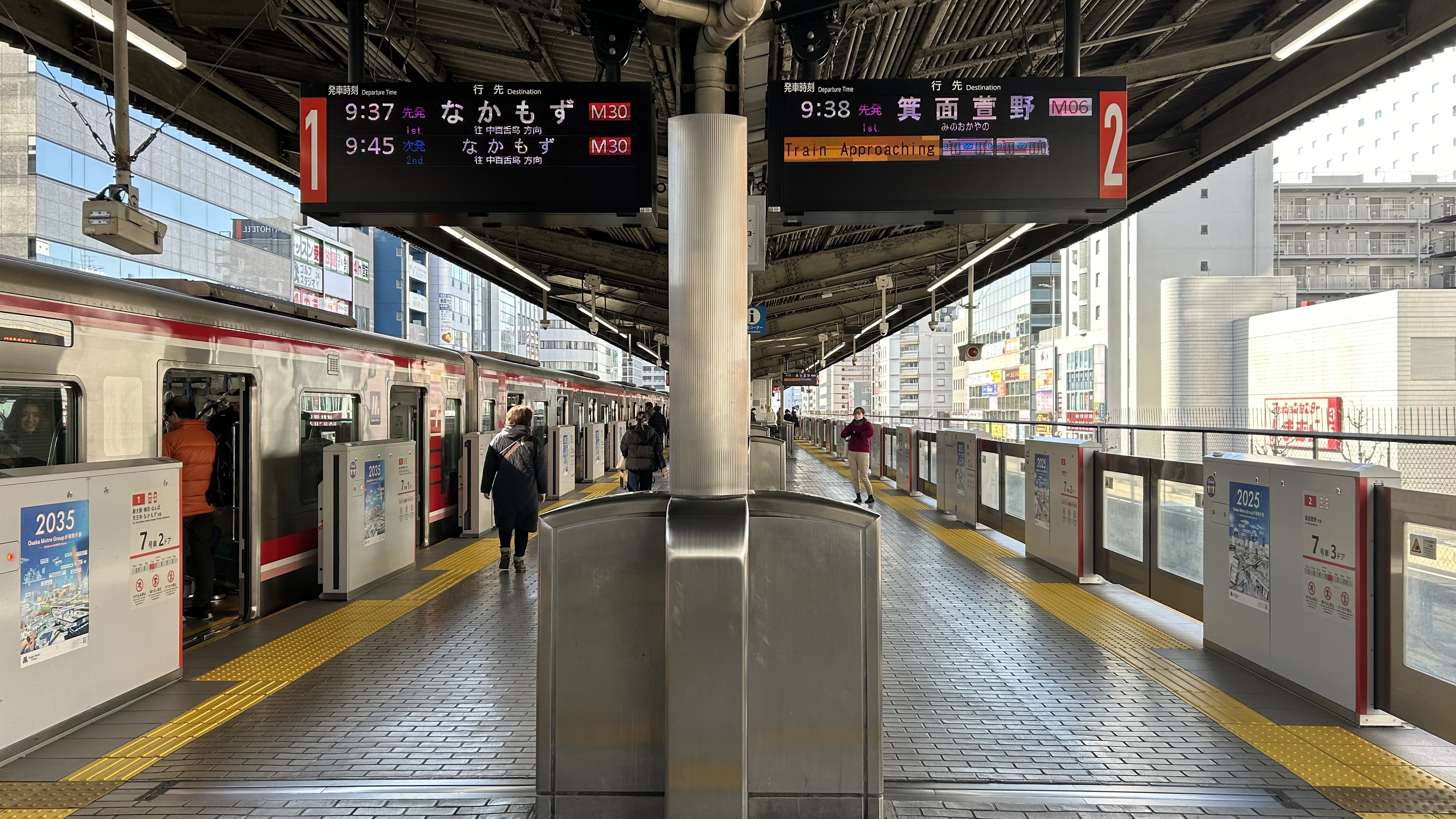
- Esaka Station platform in February 2025

General information
- Location: 9 Toyotsuchō, Suita, Osaka （大阪府吹田市豊津町9） Japan
- Coordinates: 34.7588°N 135.4967°E
- System: Osaka Metro
- Operator: Osaka Metro
- Lines: Midōsuji Line; Namboku Line
- Platforms: 1 island platform
- Tracks: 2

Construction
- Structure type: Elevated
- Accessible: Yes

Other information
- Station code: M 11
- Website: Official website

History
- Opened: 24 February 1970; 56 years ago

Services
Preceding station	Osaka Metro	Following station
through to Namboku Line	Midōsuji Line	Higashi-Mikuni M 12 towards Nakamozu
Terminus	Midōsuji Line	Higashi-Mikuni M 12 towards Nakamozu
Preceding station	Kita-Osaka Kyuko Railway	Following station
Ryokuchi-koen M10 towards Minoh-kayano	Namboku Line	through to Midōsuji Line
Location
- Location within Osaka Prefecture Location within Japan

Esaka Station (江坂駅, Esaka-eki) is a railway station in Suita, Osaka, Japan, on the Osaka Metro Midosuji Line and the Kita-Osaka Kyuko Railway Namboku Line. The station is numbered "M11"; it is the northernmost station in the Osaka subway system.

== Lines ==
Esaka Station is served by the Osaka Metro Midosuji Line and the Kita-Osaka Kyuko Railway Namboku Line.

== Station layout ==
The station consists of an elevated island platform serving two tracks. The second floor has a ticket concourse. The platform is located on the third floor.

=== Platforms ===
1	■ Osaka Metro Midōsuji Line	for Shin-Osaka, Umeda, Namba, Tennoji, and Nakamozu
2	■ Kita-Osaka Kyuko Railway Namboku Line	for Minoh-kayano

== History ==
The station opened on 24 February 1970.

== Surrounding area ==
- Duskin headquarters
- Acecook headquarters
- Kirindo headquarters
- F&M headquarters
- SNK headquarters
- Shin-Osaka/Esaka Tokyu Inn
- Yoyogi Seminar, Esaka school
- Daido Life Insurance building
- Esaka park
- Suita municipal library
- Cat Music College
- Hobby Center Kato Osaka

=== Roads ===
- National Route 423
- National Route 479
