= Minoh-Kayano Station =

Metro station in Suita, Osaka Prefecture, Japan

Minoh-Kayano Station 箕面萱野駅
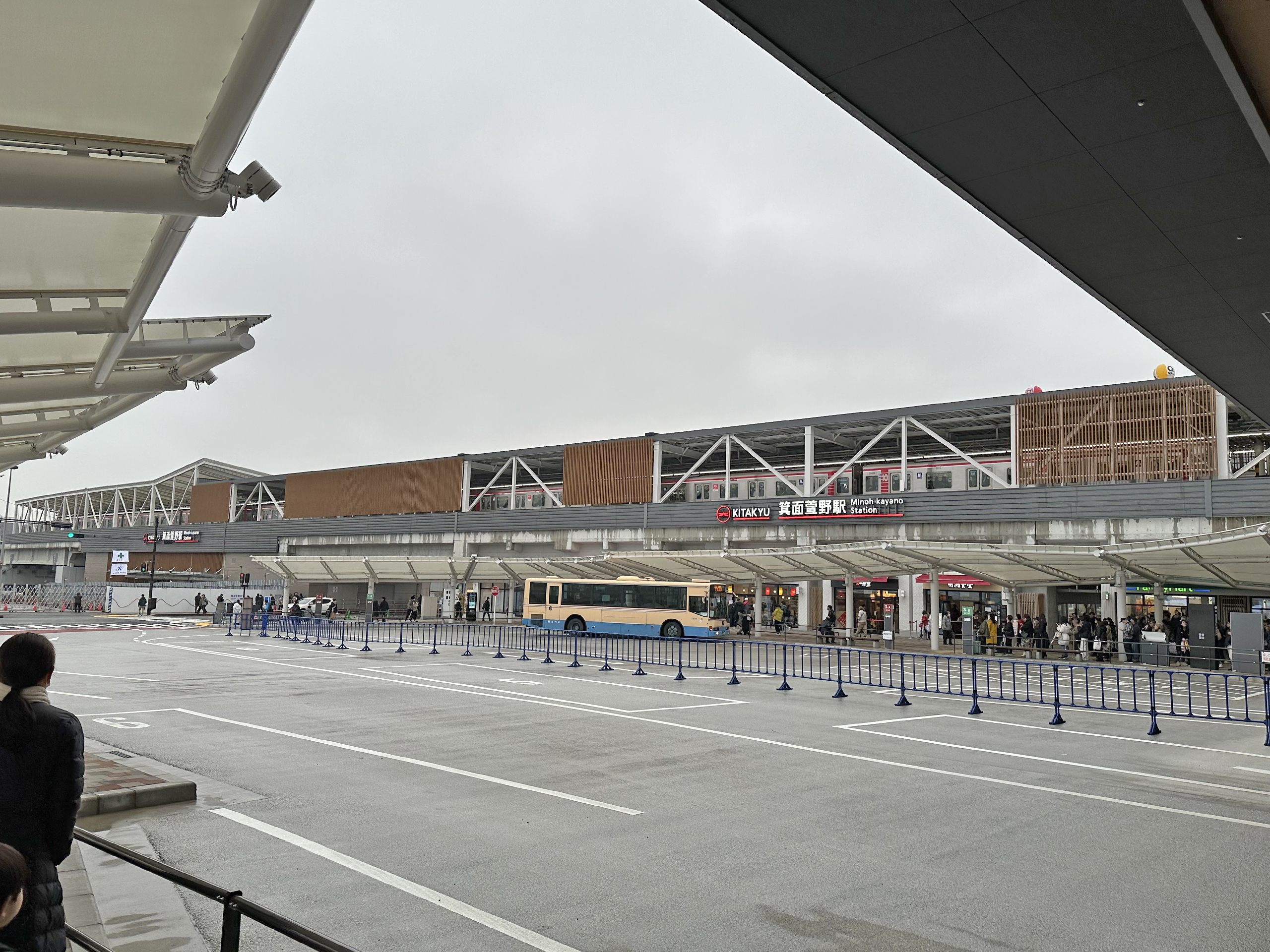
- Station building and bus stop in March 2024.

General information
- Location: Minoh, Osaka; Japan
- Coordinates: 34°49′54″N 135°29′21″E
- Operator: Kita-Osaka Kyuko Railway
- Line: Namboku Line
- Platforms: 1 Island platform
- Tracks: 2
- Connections: Bus terminal

Construction
- Structure type: Elevated
- Accessible: Yes

Other information
- Station code: M06

History
- Opening: 23 March 2024

Services
| Preceding station | Kita-Osaka Kyuko Railway | Following station |
|---|---|---|
| Terminus | Namboku Line | Minoh-Semba Handai-mae M07 towards Esaka |
Location

Minoh-Kayano Station (箕面萱野駅, Minoo Kayano eki) is a train station on the Kita-Osaka Kyuko Railway (which links directly into the Osaka Metro Midosuji Line) located in Minoh, Osaka, Japan.

== Layout ==
There is an island platform with two tracks.

| 1, 2 | ■ Kitakyu Namboku Line | for Esaka and the Midosuji Line (Shin-Osaka, Umeda, Namba, Tennoji and Nakamozu) |

== History ==
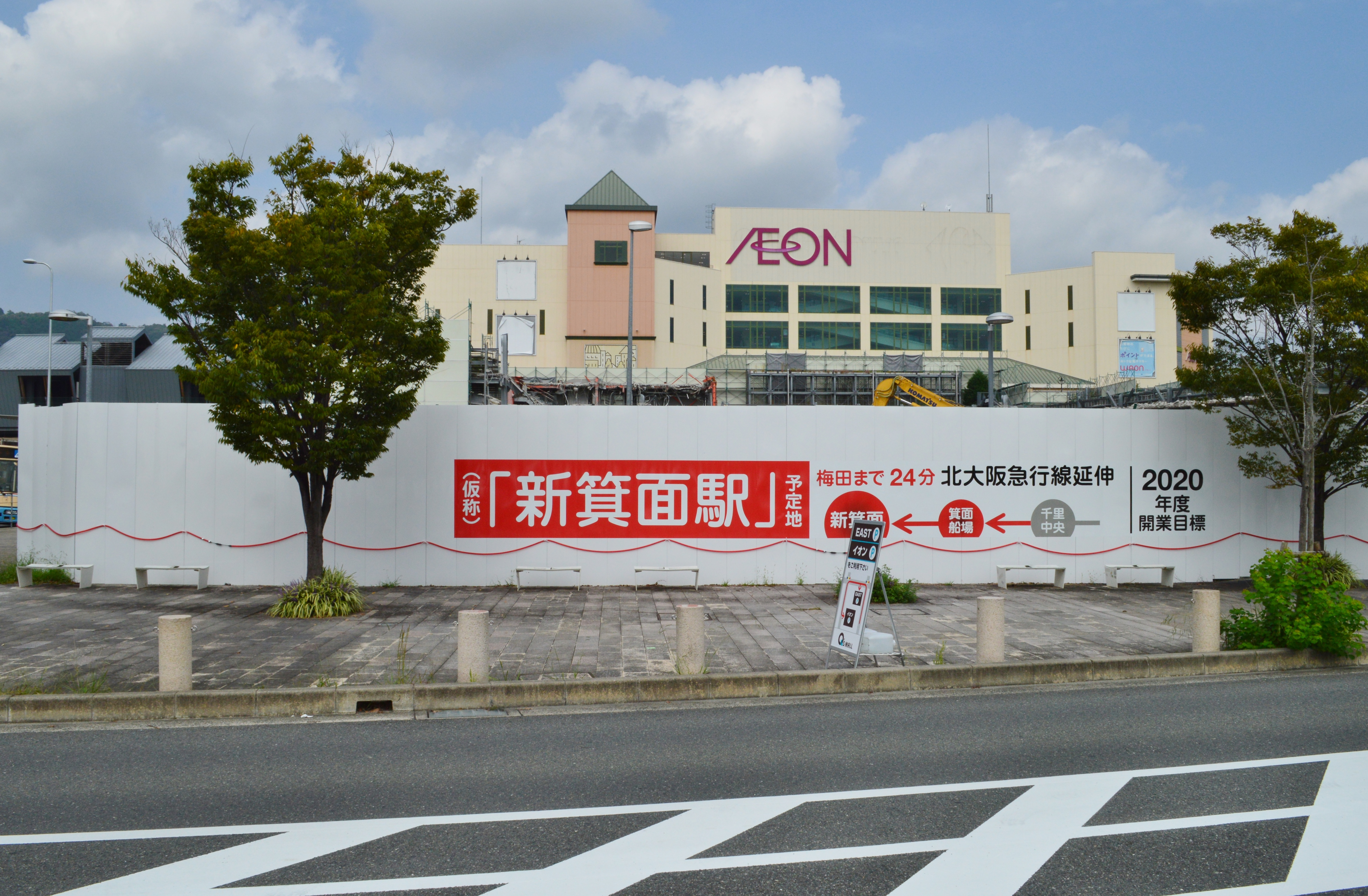
Station site with the AEON Style Minoo shopping center in the background in October 2016.

Minoh-Kayano Station was tentatively known as Shin-Minoh Station according to planning documents produced in 2010.

The name of the station was finalized in 2018.

The station opened on 23 March 2024 after delays prolonged the project's original scheduled completion in 2020.

== Surroundings ==
The surrounding area is an active commercial and retail hub. An expansion of the existing shopping mall owned by Tokyu Corporation opened alongside the new station.

== Passenger statistics ==
Minoh-Kayano Station is expected to serve an average of 28,000 passengers daily.
