= 1997 Cerezo Osaka season =

Cerezo Osaka
1997 season
- Manager: Culpi
- Stadium: Osaka Nagai Stadium
- J.League: 11th
- Emperor's Cup: 4th Round
- J.League Cup: GL-C 3rd
- Top goalscorer: Takayuki Yokoyama (11)
Home colours	Away colours

1997 Cerezo Osaka season

== Competitions ==
Competitions	Position
J.League	11th / 17 clubs
Emperor's Cup	4th round
J.League Cup	GL-C 3rd / 4 clubs

== Domestic results ==
=== J.League ===
12 April 1997 1-1	Nagoya Grampus Eight	2-3	Cerezo Osaka	Mizuho Athletic Stadium
JST (UTC+09)

16 April 1997 1-2	Cerezo Osaka	0-2	Yokohama Flügels	Osaka Nagai Stadium
JST (UTC+09)

19 April 1997 1-3	Júbilo Iwata	1-2	Cerezo Osaka	Júbilo Iwata Stadium
JST (UTC+09)

23 April 1997 1-4	Cerezo Osaka	2-2 (GG) (a.e.t.) (5-4 p)	Kashiwa Reysol	Osaka Nagai Stadium
JST (UTC+09)

26 April 1997 1-5	Urawa Red Diamonds	1-2	Cerezo Osaka	Urawa Komaba Stadium
JST (UTC+09)

3 May 1997 1-6	Cerezo Osaka	0-2	Gamba Osaka	Osaka Nagai Stadium
JST (UTC+09)

7 May 1997 1-7	Verdy Kawasaki	0-2	Cerezo Osaka	Todoroki Athletics Stadium
JST (UTC+09)

10 May 1997 1-8	Cerezo Osaka	1-2	Kyoto Purple Sanga	Tottori Soccer Stadium
JST (UTC+09)

17 May 1997 1-9	JEF United Ichihara	3-0	Cerezo Osaka	Ichihara Seaside Stadium
JST (UTC+09)

24 May 1997 1-10	Cerezo Osaka	0-2	Bellmare Hiratsuka	Technoport Fukui Stadium
JST (UTC+09)

28 May 1997 1-11	Yokohama Marinos	3-2 (GG) (a.e.t.)	Cerezo Osaka	Yokohama Mitsuzawa Stadium
JST (UTC+09)

31 May 1997 1-12	Cerezo Osaka	1-2 (GG) (a.e.t.)	Shimizu S-Pulse	Osaka Nagai Stadium
JST (UTC+09)

5 July 1997 1-13	Sanfrecce Hiroshima	2-2 (GG) (a.e.t.) (3-2 p)	Cerezo Osaka	Hiroshima Big Arch
JST (UTC+09)

9 July 1997 1-14	Cerezo Osaka	2-0	Avispa Fukuoka	Osaka Nagai Stadium
JST (UTC+09)

1-15	bye

16 July 1997 1-16	Vissel Kobe	1-2	Cerezo Osaka	Kobe Universiade Memorial Stadium
JST (UTC+09)

19 July 1997 1-17	Cerezo Osaka	0-1	Kashima Antlers	Osaka Nagai Stadium
JST (UTC+09)

30 July 1997 2-1	Cerezo Osaka	3-1	Vissel Kobe	Osaka Nagai Stadium
JST (UTC+09)

2 August 1997 2-2	Cerezo Osaka	2-3	Nagoya Grampus Eight	Osaka Nagai Stadium
JST (UTC+09)

6 August 1997 2-3	Yokohama Flügels	1-2 (GG) (a.e.t.)	Cerezo Osaka	Yokohama Mitsuzawa Stadium
JST (UTC+09)

9 August 1997 2-4	Cerezo Osaka	1-4	Júbilo Iwata	Osaka Nagai Stadium
JST (UTC+09)

16 August 1997 2-5	Kashiwa Reysol	0-1	Cerezo Osaka	Hitachi Kashiwa Soccer Stadium
JST (UTC+09)

20 August 1997 2-6	Cerezo Osaka	1-2	Urawa Red Diamonds	Osaka Nagai Stadium
JST (UTC+09)

23 August 1997 2-7	Gamba Osaka	3-2 (GG) (a.e.t.)	Cerezo Osaka	Osaka Expo '70 Stadium
JST (UTC+09)

30 August 1997 2-8	Cerezo Osaka	5-3	Verdy Kawasaki	Osaka Nagai Stadium
JST (UTC+09)

3 September 1997 2-9	Kyoto Purple Sanga	1-1 (GG) (a.e.t.) (6-7 p)	Cerezo Osaka	Nishikyogoku Athletic Stadium
JST (UTC+09)

6 September 1997 2-10	Cerezo Osaka	1-0	JEF United Ichihara	Osaka Nagai Stadium
JST (UTC+09)

2-11	bye

13 September 1997 2-12	Bellmare Hiratsuka	5-4 (GG) (a.e.t.)	Cerezo Osaka	Hiratsuka Athletics Stadium
JST (UTC+09)

20 September 1997 2-13	Shimizu S-Pulse	2-0	Cerezo Osaka	Nihondaira Sports Stadium
JST (UTC+09)

24 September 1997 2-14	Cerezo Osaka	2-3 (GG) (a.e.t.)	Yokohama Marinos	Osaka Nagai Stadium
JST (UTC+09)

27 September 1997 2-15	Cerezo Osaka	3-1	Sanfrecce Hiroshima	Oita Athletic Stadium
JST (UTC+09)

1 October 1997 2-16	Avispa Fukuoka	0-2	Cerezo Osaka	Hakatanomori Football Stadium
JST (UTC+09)

4 October 1997 2-17	Kashima Antlers	1-2	Cerezo Osaka	Kashima Soccer Stadium
JST (UTC+09)

=== Emperor's Cup ===
1st Round	bye

2nd Round	bye

14 December 1997 3rd Round	Cerezo Osaka	5-1	Ventforet Kofu	Osaka Nagai Second Stadium
JST (UTC+09)

20 December 1997 4th Round	Cerezo Osaka	2-3	Júbilo Iwata	Nagasaki Athletic Stadium
JST (UTC+09)

=== J.League Cup ===
8 March 1997 GL-C-1	Kashima Antlers	2-4	Cerezo Osaka	Kashima Soccer Stadium
JST (UTC+09)

15 March 1997 GL-C-2	Cerezo Osaka	2-0	Sagan Tosu	Osaka Nagai Stadium
JST (UTC+09)

19 March 1997 GL-C-3	Cerezo Osaka	1-1	Urawa Red Diamonds	Osaka Nagai Stadium
JST (UTC+09)

22 March 1997 GL-C-4	Sagan Tosu	0-0	Cerezo Osaka	Tosu Stadium
JST (UTC+09)

26 March 1997 GL-C-5	Urawa Red Diamonds	3-1	Cerezo Osaka	Urawa Komaba Stadium
JST (UTC+09)

29 March 1997 GL-C-6	Cerezo Osaka	3-4	Kashima Antlers	Osaka Nagai Stadium
JST (UTC+09)

== Player statistics ==
No.	Pos.	Nat.	Player	D.o.B. (Age)	Height / Weight	J.League		Emperor's Cup		J.League Cup		Total	
No.	Pos.	Nat.	Player	D.o.B. (Age)	Height / Weight	Apps	Goals	Apps	Goals	Apps	Goals	Apps	Goals
1	GK	(Japan)	Jiro Takeda	September 18, 1972 (aged 24)	178 cm / 76 kg	2	0	0	0	0	0	2	0
2	DF	(Japan)	Masanori Kizawa	June 2, 1969 (aged 27)	170 cm / 62 kg	28	0	2	0	5	0	35	0
3	DF	(Japan)	Hiroyuki Inagaki	April 24, 1970 (aged 26)	176 cm / 78 kg	0	0		0	0	0		0
4	DF	(Brazil)	Jean	December 5, 1969 (aged 27)	189 cm / 89 kg	18	3	2	1	2	0	22	4
5	MF	(Japan)	Kazunari Koga	April 17, 1972 (aged 24)	176 cm / 71 kg	11	0	0	0	6	0	17	0
6	DF	(Japan)	Katsuo Kanda	June 21, 1966 (aged 30)	182 cm / 74 kg	28	1	2	0	0	0	30	1
7	MF	(Japan)	Makoto Yonekura	December 28, 1970 (aged 26)	176 cm / 69 kg	16	0	2	0	6	1	24	1
8	MF	(Japan)	Hiroaki Morishima	April 30, 1972 (aged 24)	168 cm / 62 kg	21	10	2	2	0	0	23	12
9	FW	(Japan)	Akinori Nishizawa	June 18, 1976 (aged 20)	180 cm / 74 kg	19	7	2	1	2	2	23	10
10	MF	(Brazil)	Manoel	March 2, 1972 (aged 25)	175 cm / 67 kg	11	1	0	0	5	2	16	3
11	FW	(South Korea)	Ko Jeong-woon	June 27, 1966 (aged 30)	177 cm / 79 kg	17	3	0	0	5	3	22	6
12	MF	(Japan)	Takayuki Yokoyama	December 22, 1972 (aged 24)	171 cm / 65 kg	30	11	2	0	4	1	36	12
13	DF	(Japan)	Rikiya Kawamae	August 20, 1971 (aged 25)	180 cm / 68 kg	0	0		0	0	0		0
14	DF	(Japan)	Kazuhiro Murata	May 12, 1969 (aged 27)	182 cm / 75 kg	2	0	0	0	6	0	8	0
15	MF	(Japan)	Katsuhiro Minamoto	July 2, 1972 (aged 24)	176 cm / 70 kg	30	0	2	0	6	0	38	0
16	MF	(Japan)	Toshihiro Uchida	August 12, 1972 (aged 24)	174 cm / 72 kg	23	1	0	0	2	0	25	1
17	DF	(Japan)	Shigeki Kurata	June 22, 1972 (aged 24)	178 cm / 73 kg	10	0	0	0	4	0	14	0
18	MF	(Japan)	Satoshi Kajino	November 9, 1965 (aged 31)	177 cm / 71 kg	26	0	1	0	0	0	27	0
19	FW	(Japan)	Tomotaka Fukagawa	July 24, 1972 (aged 24)	180 cm / 72 kg	18	3	0	0	6	1	24	4
20	DF	(Japan)	Yoshinari Hyakutake	November 21, 1977 (aged 19)	181 cm / 80 kg	14	0	2	0	0	0	16	0
21	GK	(Brazil)	Gilmar	January 13, 1959 (aged 38)	184 cm / 78 kg	13	0	0	0	6	0	19	0
22	GK	(Japan)	Nobuhiro Takeda	March 22, 1965 (aged 31)	180 cm / 75 kg	0	0		0	0	0		0
23	GK	(Japan)	Seigo Shimokawa	November 17, 1975 (aged 21)	183 cm / 75 kg	17	0	2	0	0	0	19	0
24	DF	(Japan)	Kenichi Serata	October 20, 1973 (aged 23)	177 cm / 70 kg	2	0	0	0	2	0	4	0
25	FW	(Japan)	Kiyoyasu Kato	April 16, 1974 (aged 22)	182 cm / 70 kg	0	0		0	0	0		0
26	DF	(Japan)	Masaru Hashiguchi	May 21, 1974 (aged 22)	177 cm / 64 kg	0	0		0	0	0		0
	MF	(Japan)	Naohiro Kitade	May 14, 1973 (aged 23)	176 cm / 70 kg	0	0		0	0	0		0
	DF	(Japan)	Takahiro Sasaki	September 25, 1974 (aged 22)	180 cm / 76 kg	7	0	0	0	4	1	11	1
	MF	(Japan)	Kazuo Shimizu	April 30, 1975 (aged 21)	172 cm / 67 kg	6	0	2	0	0	0	8	0
	FW	(Japan)	Shinichi Sato	September 14, 1975 (aged 21)	174 cm / 72 kg	0	0		0	0	0		0
	MF	(Japan)	Katsutoshi Domori	June 29, 1976 (aged 20)	177 cm / 64 kg	11	0	0	0	6	0	17	0
	FW	(Japan)	Taro Urabe	July 11, 1977 (aged 19)	169 cm / 60 kg	15	0	0	0	2	0	17	0
	MF	(Japan)	Tetsu Yamato	May 30, 1978 (aged 18)	170 cm / 60 kg	0	0		0	0	0		0
	MF/FW	(Japan)	Shingo Aino	July 23, 1978 (aged 18)	167 cm / 57 kg	0	0		0	0	0		0
	FW	(Japan)	Masaya Nishitani	September 16, 1978 (aged 18)	170 cm / 62 kg	3	0	1	0	0	0	4	0
	MF	(Japan)	Takashi Miyamoto	October 15, 1978 (aged 18)	175 cm / 68 kg	0	0		0	0	0		0
	DF	(Japan)	Masahide Kubo	December 16, 1978 (aged 18)	165 cm / 58 kg	0	0		0	0	0		0
27	FW	(Brazil)	Claudinho †	April 19, 1967 (aged 29)	180 cm / 72 kg	16	8	2	2	0	0	18	10
28	MF	(Brazil)	Alex †	April 22, 1969 (aged 27)	178 cm / 73 kg	16	5	2	1	0	0	18	6
21	GK	(Japan)	Takeaki Yuhara †	January 13, 1978 (aged 19)	cm / kg	0	0		0	0	0		0
	GK	(Japan)	Makoto Fukuyama †	no data	-cm / -kg	0	0		0	0	0		0

- † player(s) joined the team after the opening of this season.

== Transfers ==
In:

No.	Pos.	Nation	Player
4	DF	BRA	Jean Elias Peixoto (from Cruzeiro)
26	DF	JPN	Masaru Hashiguchi (from Hannan University)
—	DF	JPN	Takahiro Sasaki (from Waseda University)
—	DF	JPN	Masahide Kubo (from Cerezo Osaka youth)
16	MF	JPN	Toshihiro Uchida (from Nagoya Grampus Eight)
—	MF	JPN	Tetsu Yamato (from Cerezo Osaka youth)
—	MF	JPN	Shingo Aino (from Cerezo Osaka youth)
—	MF	JPN	Takashi Miyamoto (from Cerezo Osaka youth)
11	FW	KOR	Ko Jeong-woon (from Ilhwa Cheonan)
25	FW	JPN	Kiyoyasu Kato (from Hannan University)

Out:

No.	Pos.	Nation	Player
—	GK	JPN	Shinji Yamasaki
—	DF	JPN	Akimasa Tsukamoto (to Sagan Tosu)
—	DF	JPN	Masato Otake
—	DF	JPN	Taku Watanabe (to Consadole Sapporo)
—	DF	JPN	Koji Yamaguchi
—	DF	JPN	Takahiro Hatakeda
—	MF	BRA	Marquinhos
—	MF	JPN	Mitsuhiro Misaki
—	MF	JPN	Toru Kishimoto
—	MF	JPN	Takashi Yamahashi (to Consadole Sapporo)
—	MF	JPN	Tatsuya Kojima
—		BRA	Narcizio
—		BRA	Guga

== Transfers during the season ==
=== In ===
- (Brazil) Claudinho (on July)
- (Brazil) Alex Lopes de Nascimento (on July)
- (Japan) Takeaki Yuhara (on July)
- (Japan) Makoto Fukuyama (on July)

=== Out ===
- (Japan) Shinichi Sato (loan to Sagan Tosu on January)
- (Brazil) Gilmar (on July)
- (Brazil) Manoel (to Botafogo on July)

== Awards ==
none

== Other pages ==
- (in Japanese) J. League official site
- (in Japanese) Cerezo Osaka official site
