= Osaka derby =

Local derby in Osaka

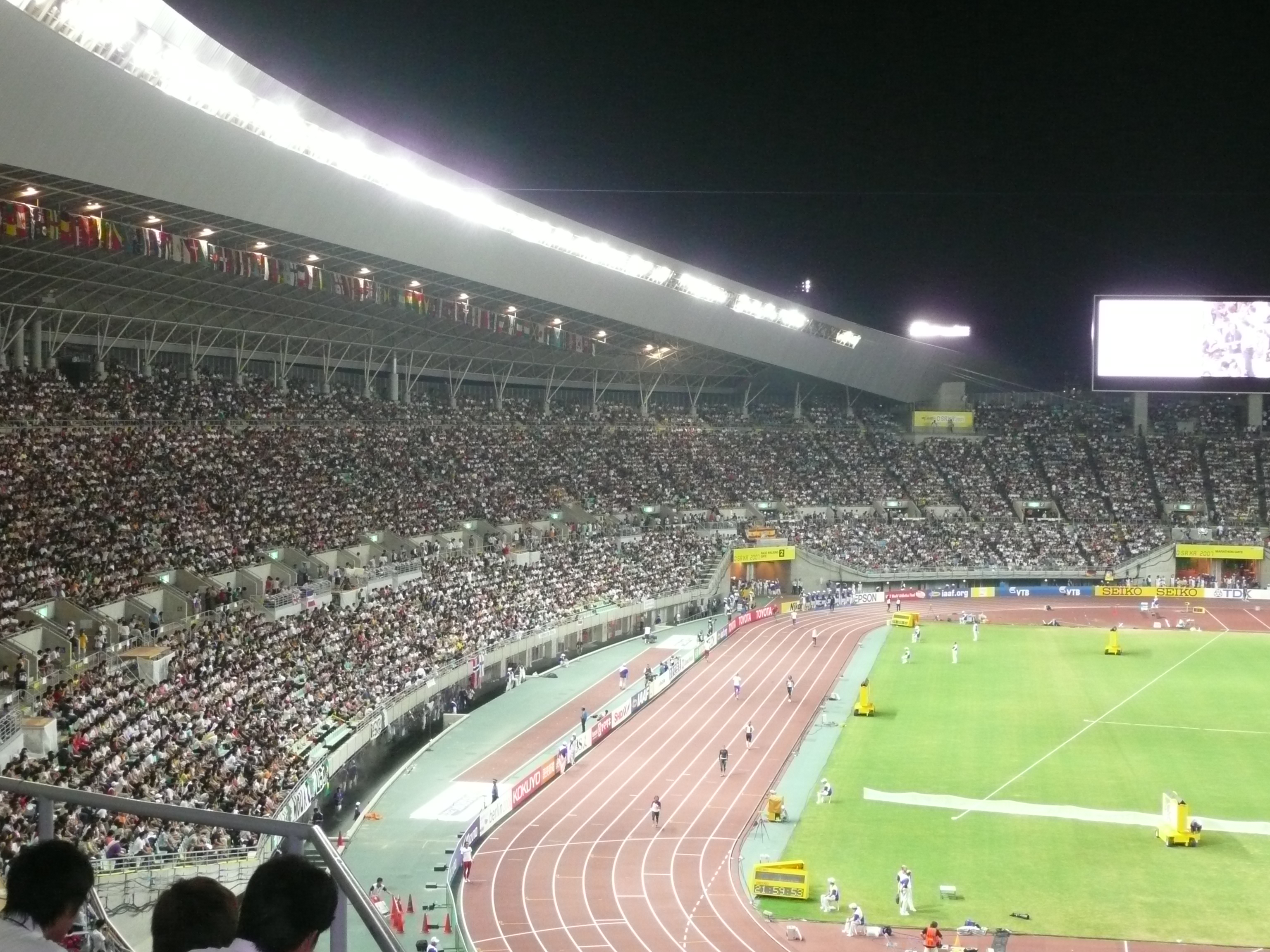
- Nagai Stadium, one of the derby's venue
- Location: Osaka Prefecture
- Teams: Cerezo Osaka; Gamba Osaka
- First meeting: 22 December 1982; Emperor's Cup; Matsushita 2–4 Yanmar
- Latest meeting: 11 April 2026; J1 100 Year Vision League; Gamba 0–1 Cerezo
- Stadiums: Nagai Stadium, Yodoko Sakura Stadium (Cerezo); Suita Stadium (Gamba)

Statistics
- Total meetings: 78
- Most wins: Both clubs (31)
- Top scorer: Fernandinho; Hiroaki Morishima; Masashi Oguro (6 goals each)
- All-time series: Cerezo: 31; Drawn: 16; Gamba: 31
- Largest victory: 2 October 2004; J.League Division 1 Gamba 7–1 Cerezo

The Osaka derby (大阪ダービー, Ōsaka dābī) is the local derby in Osaka Prefecture, Japan, between fierce rivals Cerezo Osaka (based in Osaka City) and Gamba Osaka (based in Suita).

== History ==
In the 1970s, Yanmar Diesel, co-founder of the Japan Soccer League in 1965, had its reserve squad, Yanmar Club, play in the JSL's Second Division. At the end of 1979, the reserve club was closed by the parent company. Most of its players and staff found refuge when Matsushita Electric Industrial took them in with the aim of forming a new club to compete in the JSL. The new Matsushita Electric SC was formed initially playing in Nara and over the years began moving into Osaka for games.

The two clubs met in the 1982 and 1984 Emperor's Cups – both won by Yanmar – before their first league meeting during the 1986–87 season. At the time, newcomers Matsushita Electric struggled and ended up being relegated; they did not return until 1988–89 season. At the end of 1990–91 season, Yanmar lost top division status for the first time. Matsushita Electric, who had already applied to take part in the new J.League, was chosen instead to be the representative of Osaka in the new league, taking the name Gamba Osaka.

After competing for three seasons in the old Japan Football League, Yanmar Diesel, which had taken the name Cerezo Osaka in 1994, was promoted to the J. League. Since then, both clubs meet in every top division season except in 2002, 2007 to 2009, and 2015 to 2016, when Cerezo competed in second division, as well as in 2013, when Gamba did the same.

== Honours ==
As of 16 May 2026

Competition	Cerezo	Gamba
JSL Division 1	4	0
J.League/J.League Division 1/J1 League	0	2
Emperor's Cup	4	5
JSL Cup / J.League Cup	4	2
Japanese Super Cup	1	2
Asian Club Championship/AFC Champions League/ AFC Champions League Elite	0	1
AFC Cup/AFC Champions League Two	0	1
Total	13	13

== Statistics ==
As of 11 April 2026, competitive matches only

Competition	Played	Cerezo wins	Draws	Gamba wins	Cerezo goals	Gamba goals
JSL Division 1	8	4	3	1	9	6
J.League/J.League Division 1/J1 League	50	18	7	25	62	84
J1 100 Year Vision League	2	1	1	0	1	0
Emperor's Cup	5	4	0	1	13	7
J.League Cup	12	3	5	4	16	16
AFC Champions League	1	1	0	0	1	0
Total	78	31	16	31	102	113

== Matches ==
=== JSL Division 1 ===
#	Date	Home scorers	Home	Result	Away	Away scorers	Report
1	29 November 1986	unknown	Yanmar	2–1	Matsushita	unknown	Report
2	13 May 1987	unknown	Matsushita	2–2	Yanmar	unknown	Report
3	27 November 1988	unknown	Yanmar	1–0	Matsushita	unknown	Report
4	23 April 1989	unknown	Matsushita	1–3	Yanmar	unknown	Report
5	7 October 1989	unknown	Yanmar	0–0	Matsushita	unknown	Report
6	27 January 1990	unknown	Matsushita	0–1	Yanmar	unknown	Report
7	28 October 1990	unknown	Matsushita	2–0	Yanmar	unknown	Report
8	24 February 1991	unknown	Yanmar	0–0	Matsushita	unknown	Report

=== J.League/J.League Division 1/J1 League ===
#	Date	Home scorers	Home	Result	Away	Away scorers	Report
1	3 May 1995	Valdés	Cerezo	1–0	Gamba		Report
2	19 July 1995	Aleinikov	Gamba	1–0	Cerezo		Report
3	30 September 1995	Bernardo, Marquinhos, Morishima	Cerezo	3–2	Gamba	Isogai (2)	Report
4	22 November 1995	Gillhaus, Hiraoka, T. Yamaguchi, Aleinikov	Gamba	4–0	Cerezo		Report
5	18 May 1996		Cerezo	0–2	Gamba	Gillhaus, Kiba	Report
6	14 September 1996	Matsuyama, Matsunami	Gamba	2–0	Cerezo		Report
7	3 May 1997		Cerezo	0–2	Gamba	Krupni, Matsunami	Report
8	23 August 1997	Krupni (2), M'Boma	Gamba	3–2 (g.g.)	Cerezo	Yokoyama (2)	Report
9	21 March 1998	Krupni	Gamba	1–2	Cerezo	Morishima, Yokoyama	Report
10	15 September 1998	Nishitani, Morishima	Cerezo	2–1	Gamba	Kojima	Report
11	15 May 1999	Drobnjak	Gamba	1–2	Cerezo	Morishima, S. H. Hwang	Report
12	11 September 1999	Manaka, Nishizawa, S. H. Hwang (2)	Cerezo	4–1	Gamba	Kojima	Report
13	3 May 2000	Yoshihara, Araiba	Gamba	2–1	Cerezo	Morishima	Report
14	15 July 2000		Cerezo	0–1	Gamba	Vital	Report
15	7 April 2001	Yoshihara, Kojima	Gamba	2–1	Cerezo	Shi. Kurata	Report
16	13 October 2001	Oshiba, Yoon	Cerezo	2–1 (g.g.)	Gamba	Yoshihara	Report
17	13 July 2003		Gamba	0–2	Cerezo	Okubo, Miyamoto (o.g.)	Report
18	19 October 2003		Cerezo	0–2	Gamba	Magrão, Futagawa	Report
19	16 June 2004		Cerezo	0–1	Gamba	Nakayama	Report
20	2 October 2004	Fernandinho (2), S. Yamaguchi, Oguro (3), Yoshihara	Gamba	7–1	Cerezo	Okubo	Report
21	14 May 2005	Nishizawa (2)	Cerezo	2–4	Gamba	Oguro (2), Araújo (2)	Report
22	23 July 2005	Araújo (2), Hashimoto, Endo	Gamba	4–1	Cerezo	Tsurumi	Report
23	12 March 2006	Nishizawa	Cerezo	1–6	Gamba	Fernandinho (3), Magno Alves (3)	Report
24	9 September 2006	Bando (2), Endo	Gamba	3–1	Cerezo	Fujimoto	Report
25	14 March 2010	Adriano	Cerezo	1–1	Gamba	Myojin	Report
26	18 September 2010	Usami, Nakazawa, Yasuda	Gamba	3–2	Cerezo	Inui, Amaral	Report
27	5 March 2011	Adriano, Endo	Gamba	2–1	Cerezo	Shu Kurata	Report
28	13 August 2011	B. K. Kim	Cerezo	1–1	Gamba	Nakazawa	Report
29	17 March 2012	Branquinho, Kempes	Cerezo	2–1	Gamba	Paulinho	Report
30	11 August 2012	Sato (2)	Gamba	2–2	Cerezo	Edamura (2)	Report
31	12 April 2014	Forlán (2)	Cerezo	2–2	Gamba	Abe (2)	Report
32	20 September 2014	Abe, Sato	Gamba	2–0	Cerezo		Report
33	16 April 2017	Sugimoto (2)	Cerezo	2–2	Gamba	Fujiharu, Shu Kurata	Report
34	29 July 2017	U. J. Hwang, Miura, Ademilson	Gamba	3–1	Cerezo	Sugimoto	Report
35	21 April 2018	U. J. Hwang	Gamba	1–0	Cerezo		Report
36	6 October 2018		Cerezo	0–1	Gamba	Ademilson	Report
37	18 May 2019	Shu Kurata	Gamba	1–0	Cerezo		Report
38	28 September 2019	Mendes, Jonjić, Mizunuma	Cerezo	3–1	Gamba	J. H. Kim (o.g.)	Report
39	4 July 2020	Ademilson	Gamba	1–2	Cerezo	Okuno, Maruhashi	Report
40	3 November 2020	Toyokawa	Cerezo	1–1	Gamba	Ideguchi	Report
41	2 May 2021	Nakajima	Cerezo	1–1	Gamba	Patric	Report
42	28 August 2021		Gamba	0–1	Cerezo	Riku Matsuda	Report
43	21 May 2022	Taggart, Okuno (2)	Cerezo	3–1	Gamba	Yamami	Report
44	16 July 2022	Kwon	Gamba	1–2	Cerezo	Yamada, Jean Patric	Report
45	3 May 2023	Dawhan	Gamba	1–2	Cerezo	Léo Ceará, Kato	Report
46	28 October 2023	Léo Ceará	Cerezo	1–0	Gamba		Report
47	6 May 2024	Usami	Gamba	1–0	Cerezo		Report
48	2 October 2024	Nishio	Cerezo	1–0	Gamba		Report
49	14 February 2025	Lavi, Kurokawa	Gamba	2–5	Cerezo	Kitano (2), Kagawa, Tanaka, Nakajima	Report
50	5 July 2025		Cerezo	0–1	Gamba	Handa	Report

=== J1 100 Year Vision League ===
#	Date	Home scorers	Home	Result	Away	Away scorers	Report
1	7 February 2026		Cerezo	0–0 (4–5 p)	Gamba		Report
2	11 April 2026		Gamba	0–1	Cerezo	Thiago	Report

=== Emperor's Cup ===
#	Date	Home scorers	Home	Result	Away	Away scorers	Report
1	22 December 1982	unknown	Matsushita	2–4	Yanmar	unknown	Report
2	19 December 1984	unknown	Matsushita	0–2	Yanmar	unknown	Report
3	20 December 2003	Baron (2), Okubo	Cerezo	3–2 (g.g.)	Gamba	Araiba, Yoshihara	Report
4	24 December 2005	Morishima, Furuhashi, Fabinho	Cerezo	3–1	Gamba	Sidiclei	Report
5	23 December 2012	Kakitani	Cerezo	1–2 (a.e.t.)	Gamba	Endo, Ienaga	Report

=== J.League Cup ===
#	Date	Home scorers	Home	Result	Away	Away scorers	Report
1	8 March 2003	Matsunami	Gamba	1–0	Cerezo		Report
2	23 April 2003	Tokushige, Nishizawa	Cerezo	2–2	Gamba	S. Yamaguchi, Oguro	Report
3	6 August 2005		Cerezo	0–3	Gamba	Sidiclei, Hashimoto, Ienaga	Report
4	13 August 2005	Fernandinho, Araújo	Gamba	2–2	Cerezo	Zé Carlos, Furuhashi	Report
5	4 October 2017	Ricardo Santos, Kimoto	Cerezo	2–2	Gamba	Akasaki, Ide	Report
6	8 October 2017	Izumisawa	Gamba	1–2	Cerezo	Kakitani, Kimoto	Report
7	1 September 2021		Cerezo	0–1	Gamba	Yamami	Report
8	5 September 2021		Gamba	0–4	Cerezo	Yamada, Kato, Fujita, Riki Matsuda	Report
9	23 February 2022	Yamamoto, Yanagisawa	Gamba	2–3	Cerezo	Tameda, Uejo, Nakahara	Report
10	23 April 2022		Cerezo	0–0	Gamba		Report
11	26 March 2023	Meshino	Gamba	1–1	Cerezo	Maikuma	Report
12	18 June 2023		Cerezo	0–1	Gamba	Handa	Report

=== AFC Champions League ===
#	Date	Home scorers	Home	Result	Away	Away scorers	Report
1	22 May 2011		Gamba	0–1	Cerezo	Takahashi	Report

=== Friendly ===
#	Date	Home scorers	Home	Result	Away	Away scorers	Report
1	4 March 1995	unknown	Gamba	0–3	Cerezo	unknown	
2	2 March 1996	unknown	Cerezo	1–1	Gamba	unknown	
3	1 March 1997	unknown	Gamba	2–2	Cerezo	unknown	
4	22 February 2009	Kagawa	Cerezo	1–0	Gamba		Report

== Goalscorers ==
As of 11 April 2026, competitive matches only

Rank	Player	Club	Goals
1	(Brazil) Fernandinho	Gamba	6
1	(Japan) Hiroaki Morishima	Cerezo	6
1	(Japan) Masashi Oguro	Gamba	6
4	(Brazil) Araújo	Gamba	5
4	(Japan) Akinori Nishizawa	Cerezo	5
4	(Japan) Kota Yoshihara	Gamba	5
7	(Japan) Yasuhito Endo	Gamba	4
7	(Serbia) Krupni	Gamba	4
9	(Japan) Hiroyuki Abe	Gamba	3
9	(Brazil) Ademilson	Gamba	3
9	(Brazil) Magno Alves	Gamba	3
9	(South Korea) Hwang Sun-hong	Cerezo	3
9	(Japan) Hiromi Kojima	Gamba	3
9	(Japan) Shu Kurata	Gamba; Cerezo	3
9	(Japan) Masanobu Matsunami	Gamba	3
9	(Japan) Yoshito Okubo	Cerezo	3
9	(Japan) Hiroaki Okuno	Cerezo	3
9	(Japan) Akihiro Sato	Gamba	3
9	(Japan) Kenyu Sugimoto	Cerezo	3
9	(Japan) Takayuki Yokoyama	Cerezo	3

== Players who played for both clubs ==
Player	Gamba	Cerezo
(Japan) Yoji Mizuguchi	1980	1967–1971
(Japan) Hirokazu Sasaki	1980–1992	1994–1995
(Japan) Tomoo Kudaka	1981–1993	1994–1995
(Japan) Tomoyuki Kajino	1983–1992	1992–1993
(Thailand) Witthaya Laohakul	1987–1990	1977–1978
(Brazil) Lange	1991–1992	1987–1991
(Japan) Katsuhiro Kusaki	1992–1993	1981–1992
(Japan) Daisuke Saito	1997–1999	2000–2002
(Japan) Yuji Hironaga	1998–1999	2003–2004
(Japan) Ryuji Bando	1998–1999, 2006–2009	2010–2013
(Japan) Toru Araiba	1998–2003	2013–2014
(Japan) Hideo Hashimoto	1998–2011	2015–2016
(Japan) Hiroshige Yanagimoto	1999–2002	2003–2006
(Japan) Arata Kodama	2001–2005	2012
(Japan) Motohiro Yoshida	2003–2004	2005–2007
(Japan) Akihiro Ienaga	2004–2007, 2012–2013	2010
(Japan) Akira Kaji	2006–2014	1998–1999
(Japan) Shu Kurata	2007–2009, 2012–	2011
(Japan) Sota Nakazawa	2007–2012	2015–2016
(Brazil) Adriano	2011	2010
(Japan) Yohei Takeda	2012	2013
(Japan) Riku Matsuda	2024	2016–2023
(Japan) Takeru Kishimoto	2024–	2016–2017
(Japan) Tokuma Suzuki	2024–	2022–2023
