= 1995 Cerezo Osaka season =

Cerezo Osaka
1995 season
- Manager: Paulo Emilio
- Stadium: Osaka Nagai No.2 Stadium
- J.League: 8th
- Emperor's Cup: 2nd Round
- Top goalscorer: League: Valdés (19); All: Valdés (19)
- Highest home attendance: 13,748 (vs Kashima Antlers, 17 June 1995); 35,236 (vsVerdy Kawasaki, 11 November 1995, Kobe Universiade Memorial Stadium)
- Lowest home attendance: 8,098 (vs Sanfrecce Hiroshima, 4 October 1995)
- Average home league attendance: 12,097
Home colours	Away colours

1995 Cerezo Osaka season

== Review and events ==
=== League results summary ===
Overall								Home						Away					
Pld	W	D	L	GF	GA	GD	Pts	W	D	L	GF	GA	GD	W	D	L	GF	GA	GD
52	25	0	27	79	83	−4	78	15	0	11	49	36	+13	10	0	16	30	47	−17

Source: J.LEAGUE OFFICIAL RECORD & DATA 1996. ISBN 4-09-102323-1.

=== League results by round ===
J.League Suntory series (first stage)
Round	1	2	3	4	5	6	7	8	9	10	11	12	13	14	15	16	17	18	19	20	21	22	23	24	25	26
Ground	A	H	A	H	A	A	H	H	A	H	A	H	H	A	H	A	H	H	A	A	H	A	H	A	A	H
Result	W	W	W	L	L	W	L	L	W	W	W	L	W	L	L	L	L	L	L	W	W	L	W	W	L	W
Position	4	3	2	4	6	6	8	8	8	8	6	7	6	7	8	8	8	8	10	10	10	10	10	9	10	9

Source: J.LEAGUE OFFICIAL RECORD & DATA 1996. ISBN 4-09-102323-1.
A = Away; H = Home; W = Win; D = Draw; L = Loss

J.League NICOS series (second stage)
Round	1	2	3	4	5	6	7	8	9	10	11	12	13	14	15	16	17	18	19	20	21	22	23	24	25	26
Ground	H	A	H	A	H	A	H	H	A	A	H	A	H	H	A	H	A	H	A	A	H	H	A	H	A	A
Result	W	L	L	L	L	L	L	W	W	L	W	L	W	L	W	W	L	W	L	W	W	W	L	W	L	L
Position	5	8	10	12	11	13	13	13	11	12	9	11	11	11	9	9	10	8	9	8	8	6	8	6	10	10

Source: J.LEAGUE OFFICIAL RECORD & DATA 1996. ISBN 4-09-102323-1.
A = Away; H = Home; W = Win; D = Draw; L = Loss

== Competitions ==
Competitions	Position
J.League	8th / 14 clubs
Emperor's Cup	2nd round

== Domestic results ==
=== J.League ===
18 March 1995 1st-1	Sanfrecce Hiroshima	0–1 (V-goal) (a.e.t.)	Cerezo Osaka	Hiroshima Big Arch
15:04 JST (UTC+09)		J. League	Yamahashi 113'	Attendance: 14,175; Referee: Kenji Tanaka; Assistant referees: Hiroshi Tanabe, Naoki Esumi; Fourth official: Yutaka Miyake; Man of the Match: Takashi Yamahashi

22 March 1995 1st-2	Cerezo Osaka	2–2 (V-goal) (a.e.t.) (4–3 p)	Nagoya Grampus Eight	Osaka Nagai No.2 Stadium
19:04 JST (UTC+09)	Kizawa 9'; Valdés 75'	J. League	Moriyama 1'; Ogura 69'	Attendance: 9,239; Referee: Yoshitsugu Katayama; Assistant referees: Yasuhiro Hemmi, Akio Okutani; Fourth official: Kazuo Kakihana; Man of the Match: Jirō Takeda
	Penalties
	(penalty scored) Marquinhos; (penalty missed) Valdés; (penalty scored) Yamahashi; (penalty scored) Kanda; (penalty missed) Murata; (penalty scored) Kizawa		(penalty scored) Durix; (penalty missed) Torres; (penalty scored) Yonekura; (penalty scored) Moriyama; (penalty missed) Asano; (penalty missed) Ogura

25 March 1995 1st-3	Shimizu S-Pulse	0–1	Cerezo Osaka	Kusanagi Athletic Stadium
16:02 JST (UTC+09)		J. League	Morishima 68'	Attendance: 16,308; Referee: Keiichi Sunakawa; Assistant referees: Kimio Izaki, Akihisa Makino; Fourth official: Masakazu Hōjō; Man of the Match: Hiroaki Morishima

29 March 1995 1st-4	Cerezo Osaka	3–4 (V-goal) (a.e.t.)	Júbilo Iwata	Osaka Nagai No.2 Stadium
19:02 JST (UTC+09)	Marquinhos 43', 89' (pen.); Morishima 48'	J. League	Fujita 25' 101'; Yonezawa 77'; Schillaci 78' (pen.)	Attendance: 10,993; Referee: Armando Perez; Assistant referees: Yasuhiro Matsuzaki, Kazuya Yanagisawa; Fourth official: Sōichirō Kaneko

1 April 1995 1st-5	Kashima Antlers	2–0	Cerezo Osaka	Kashima Soccer Stadium
19:03 JST (UTC+09)	Jorginho 0'; Hasegawa 49'	J. League		Attendance: 15,335; Referee: Kiyoshi Ōta; Assistant referees: Takashi Kunori, Hisaharu Kitamura; Fourth official: Masao Komada

5 April 1995 1st-6	Verdy Kawasaki	0–1	Cerezo Osaka	Tokyo National Stadium
19:04 JST (UTC+09)		J. League	Kizawa 60'	Attendance: 44,650; Referee: Masayoshi Okada; Assistant referees: Mitsuru Satō, Masato Nogami; Fourth official: Tsutomu Anazawa; Man of the Match: Gilmar

8 April 1995 1st-7	Cerezo Osaka	0–1 (V-goal) (a.e.t.)	Urawa Red Diamonds	Osaka Nagai No.2 Stadium
15:03 JST (UTC+09)		J. League	Fukuda 110'	Attendance: 11,763; Referee: Yōtarō Moritsu; Assistant referees: Kazuya Yanagisawa, Hiroshi Tanabe; Fourth official: Tsuyoshi Miyake

12 April 1995 1st-8	Cerezo Osaka	1–2	Bellmare Hiratsuka	Osaka Nagai No.2 Stadium
19:00 JST (UTC+09)	Kizawa 26'	J. League	Noguchi 31'; Betinho 60'	Attendance: 9,346; Referee: Shinichirō Obata; Assistant referees: Kazuo Kakihana, Mitsuyoshi Nakaguma; Fourth official: Akio Okutani

15 April 1995 1st-9	Yokohama Flügels	2–3	Cerezo Osaka	Yokohama Mitsuzawa Football Stadium
15:00 JST (UTC+09)	Maezono 18'; Hattori 33'	J. League	Valdés 41'; Kanda 81'; Kizawa 87'	Attendance: 12,257; Referee: Fumikazu Shioyazono; Assistant referees: Mitsuru Satō, Kazuhisa Osada; Fourth official: Junichi Sasaki; Man of the Match: Masanori Kizawa

22 April 1995 1st-10	Cerezo Osaka	4–0	Yokohama Marinos	Osaka Nagai No.2 Stadium
15:04 JST (UTC+09)	Valdés 5', 14', 60'; Kanda 58'	J. League		Attendance: 12,393; Referee: Kenji Tanaka; Assistant referees: Yasuhiro Hemmi, Tōru Kamikawa; Fourth official: Sōichirō Kaneko; Man of the Match: Valdés

26 April 1995 1st-11	JEF United Ichihara	3–4 (V-goal) (a.e.t.)	Cerezo Osaka	Ichihara Stadium
19:03 JST (UTC+09)	Ejiri 20'; 78' (o.g.); Rufer 80'	J. League	Marquinhos 5'; Kurata 49'; Valdés 84' 113'	Attendance: 11,757; Referee: Armando Perez; Assistant referees: Yasuhiro Matsuzaki, Kimio Izaki; Fourth official: Yoshitoshi Watanabe; Man of the Match: Valdés

29 April 1995 1st-12	Cerezo Osaka	1–2	Kashiwa Reysol	Osaka Nagai No.2 Stadium
15:00 JST (UTC+09)	Marquinhos 84'	J. League	Shimotaira 69'; N. Katō 71'	Attendance: 13,109; Referee: Yoshitsugu Katayama; Assistant referees: Morihisa Yamaguchi, Mitsuyoshi Nakaguma; Fourth official: Tsuyoshi Miyake

3 May 1995 1st-13	Cerezo Osaka	1–0	Gamba Osaka	Osaka Nagai No.2 Stadium
15:05 JST (UTC+09)	Valdés 54'	J. League		Attendance: 13,057; Referee: Juan Carlos Crespi; Assistant referees: Kazuo Kakihana, Tōru Kamikawa; Fourth official: Tsuyoshi Miyake; Man of the Match: Toninho

6 May 1995 1st-14	Nagoya Grampus Eight	6–0	Cerezo Osaka	Nagoya Mizuho Athletics Stadium
15:02 JST (UTC+09)	Hirano 28'; Passi 57'; Ogura 64'; Stojković 74'; Okayama 82'; Moriyama 83'	J. League		Attendance: 20,775; Referee: Lutz Fröhlich; Assistant referees: Noboru Ishiyama, Takuji Fukazawa; Fourth official: Tsutomu Suda

10 May 1995 1st-15	Cerezo Osaka	1–1 (V-goal) (a.e.t.) (2–3 p)	Shimizu S-Pulse	Osaka Nagai No.2 Stadium
19:03 JST (UTC+09)	Valdés 47'	J. League	Tajima 59'	Attendance: 11,497; Referee: Hiroyuki Umemoto; Assistant referees: Yoshikazu Hiroshima, Yasuhiro Hemmi; Fourth official: Sōichirō Kaneko
	Penalties
	(penalty missed) Marquinhos; (penalty scored) Kanda; (penalty missed) Yamahashi; (penalty scored) Minamoto; (penalty missed) Murata; (penalty missed) Kajino		(penalty missed) Toninho; (penalty scored) Yoshida; (penalty scored) Ōenoki; (penalty missed) Ronaldo; (penalty missed) Nagashima; (penalty scored) Aoshima

13 May 1995 1st-16	Júbilo Iwata	3–1	Cerezo Osaka	Júbilo Iwata Stadium
14:00 JST (UTC+09)	Schillaci 35', 81'; Nakayama 50'	J. League	Valdés 57'	Attendance: 18,041; Referee: Kenji Tanaka; Assistant referees: Yū Nakamura, Akio Okutani; Fourth official: Tōru Nagata

17 June 1995 1st-17	Cerezo Osaka	0–0 (V-goal) (a.e.t.) (2–4 p)	Kashima Antlers	Osaka Nagai No.2 Stadium
19:05 JST (UTC+09)		J. League		Attendance: 13,748; Referee: Yoshitsugu Katayama; Assistant referees: Morihisa Yamaguchi, Mikio Fukuoka; Fourth official: Tsuyoshi Miyake
	Penalties
	(penalty scored) Marquinhos; (penalty missed) Yamahashi; (penalty scored) Kanda; (penalty missed) Kurata		(penalty scored) Leonardo; (penalty scored) Santos; (penalty scored) Kurosaki; (penalty scored) Hasegawa

21 June 1995 1st-18	Cerezo Osaka	3–6	Verdy Kawasaki	Osaka Nagai No.2 Stadium
19:04 JST (UTC+09)	Valdés 62'; Kawamae 73'; Marquinhos 89'	J. League	Alcindo 19', 33'; Pereira 29' (pen.), 42' (pen.); Takeda 50'; Bismarck 84'	Attendance: 13,703; Referee: Armando Perez; Assistant referees: Kazuo Kakihana, Toshimitsu Yoshida; Fourth official: Sōichirō Kaneko

24 June 1995 1st-19	Urawa Red Diamonds	2–0	Cerezo Osaka	Omiya Football Stadium
18:33 JST (UTC+09)	Bein 62'; Fukuda 78' (pen.)	J. League		Attendance: 9,912; Referee: Tatsumi Ōno; Assistant referees: Masato Nogami, Hisaharu Kitamura; Fourth official: Shigeru Kimura

28 June 1995 1st-20	Bellmare Hiratsuka	1–5	Cerezo Osaka	Hiratsuka Stadium
19:03 JST (UTC+09)	Nakata 74'	J. League	Minamoto 13'; Morishima 58'; Valdés 70', 83'; Kanda 79'	Attendance: 11,905; Referee: Juan Carlos Crespi; Assistant referees: Takayoshi Kashino, Takuji Fukazawa; Fourth official: Akio Koizumi; Man of the Match: Katsuhiro Minamoto

1 July 1995 1st-21	Cerezo Osaka	5–3	Yokohama Flügels	Osaka Nagai No.2 Stadium
19:01 JST (UTC+09)	Yamahashi 21', 24'; Valdés 23', 64'; Minamoto 87' (pen.)	J. League	Maeda 44'; Rodrigo 55'; Evair 82'	Attendance: 13,242; Referee: Shinichirō Obata; Assistant referees: Yoshikazu Hiroshima, Mitsuyoshi Nakaguma; Fourth official: Sōichirō Kaneko; Man of the Match: Takashi Yamahashi

8 July 1995 1st-22	Yokohama Marinos	1–0	Cerezo Osaka	Yokohama Mitsuzawa Football Stadium
19:00 JST (UTC+09)	Bisconti 49'	J. League		Attendance: 11,469; Referee: Hideo Kikuchi; Assistant referees: Noboru Ishiyama, Akihisa Makino; Fourth official: Hisahito Okano

12 July 1995 1st-23	Cerezo Osaka	1–0	JEF United Ichihara	Osaka Nagai No.2 Stadium
19:01 JST (UTC+09)	Minamoto 2' (pen.)	J. League		Attendance: 9,699; Referee: Lutz Fröhlich; Assistant referees: Kimio Izaki, Kōji Minami; Fourth official: Kazuo Kakihana; Man of the Match: Katsuhiro Minamoto

15 July 1995 1st-24	Kashiwa Reysol	1–2 (V-goal) (a.e.t.)	Cerezo Osaka	Kashiwa Hitachi Stadium
19:02 JST (UTC+09)	Tanada 44'	J. League	Kajino 48'; Marquinhos 96' (pen.)	Attendance: 12,708; Referee: Armando Perez; Assistant referees: Toshiyuki Mayuzumi, Takeshi Ōkura; Fourth official: Morio Okamoto; Man of the Match: Marquinhos

19 July 1995 1st-25	Gamba Osaka	1–0	Cerezo Osaka	Expo '70 Commemorative Stadium
19:00 JST (UTC+09)	Aleinikov 73'	J. League		Attendance: 17,565; Referee: Kenji Tanaka; Assistant referees: Tōru Yamashiro, Akio Okutani; Fourth official: Kazuo Kakihana

22 July 1995 1st-26	Cerezo Osaka	3–1	Sanfrecce Hiroshima	Osaka Nagai No.2 Stadium
19:00 JST (UTC+09)	Toninho 57'; Marquinhos 59', 68'	J. League	Moriyama 86'	Attendance: 10,394; Referee: Yoshitsugu Katayama; Assistant referees: Kazuo Kakihana, Hideaki Harada; Fourth official: Tsuyoshi Miyake; Man of the Match: Marquinhos

12 August 1995 2nd-1	Cerezo Osaka	2–1	Kashiwa Reysol	Osaka Nagai No.2 Stadium
19:03 JST (UTC+09)	Kanda 25'; Valdés 63'	J. League	Sugano 56'	Attendance: 9,297; Referee: Yōtarō Moritsu; Assistant referees: Yoshikazu Hiroshima, Kōji Taniuchi; Fourth official: Tsuyoshi Miyake; Man of the Match: Hiroaki Morishima

16 August 1995 2nd-2	Sanfrecce Hiroshima	1–0	Cerezo Osaka	Hiroshima Big Arch
19:01 JST (UTC+09)	Uemura 88'	J. League		Attendance: 15,523; Referee: Hideo Kikuchi; Assistant referees: Hiroshi Fukuda, Hiroyuki Izumi; Fourth official: Shinji Saga

19 August 1995 2nd-3	Cerezo Osaka	0–1 (V-goal) (a.e.t.)	Urawa Red Diamonds	Osaka Nagai No.2 Stadium
19:00 JST (UTC+09)		J. League	Fukuda 115' (pen.)	Attendance: 12,091; Referee: Naotsugu Fuse; Assistant referees: Morihisa Yamaguchi, Naoyuki Mori; Fourth official: Tsuyoshi Miyake

23 August 1995 2nd-4	Bellmare Hiratsuka	1–0 (V-goal) (a.e.t.)	Cerezo Osaka	Hiratsuka Stadium
19:00 JST (UTC+09)	Narahashi 93'	J. League		Attendance: 11,426; Referee: Zoran Petrović; Assistant referees: Tetsu Karakida, Satoru Kawano; Fourth official: Takatoshi Itō

26 August 1995 2nd-5	Cerezo Osaka	0–2	Yokohama Marinos	Osaka Nagai No.2 Stadium
19:00 JST (UTC+09)		J. League	Jinno 62'; Medina Bello 83'	Attendance: 12,848; Referee: Shinichirō Obata; Assistant referees: Kazuya Yanagisawa, Yasushi Tsuchimoto; Fourth official: Kazuo Kakihana

2 September 1995 2nd-6	Júbilo Iwata	2–1	Cerezo Osaka	Júbilo Iwata Stadium
19:00 JST (UTC+09)	M. Suzuki 49'; Katsuya 74'	J. League	Morishima 26'	Attendance: 16,506; Referee: Yoshitsugu Katayama; Assistant referees: Takuji Fukazawa, Takuya Okada; Fourth official: Yoshikuni Ninomiya

6 September 1995 2nd-7	Cerezo Osaka	3–4	JEF United Ichihara	Osaka Nagai No.2 Stadium
19:05 JST (UTC+09)	Valdés 35', 60'; Inagaki 52'	J. League	Rufer 69' (pen.), 75'; Jō 85'; Y. Gotō 89'	Attendance: 8,347; Referee: Kenji Tanaka; Assistant referees: Hiroshi Tanabe, Yasuhiro Hemmi; Fourth official: Sōichirō Kaneko

9 September 1995 2nd-8	Cerezo Osaka	1–0	Kashima Antlers	Oita Athletic Stadium
19:00 JST (UTC+09)	Marquinhos 89' (pen.)	J. League		Attendance: 9,056; Referee: Fumikazu Shioyazono; Assistant referees: Hideaki Harada, Hiroyuki Izumi; Fourth official: Takanobu Kudō; Man of the Match: Marquinhos

13 September 1995 2nd-9	Nagoya Grampus Eight	0–1	Cerezo Osaka	Nagoya Mizuho Athletics Stadium
19:00 JST (UTC+09)		J. League	89' (o.g.)	Attendance: 21,485; Referee: Hiroyuki Umemoto; Assistant referees: Sōichirō Kaneko, Tōru Kamikawa; Fourth official: Tsutomu Suda; Man of the Match: Satoshi Kajino

16 September 1995 2nd-10	Verdy Kawasaki	2–1 (V-goal) (a.e.t.)	Cerezo Osaka	Sapporo Atsubetsu Stadium
14:01 JST (UTC+09)	Bismarck 4'; Hashiratani 98'	J. League	Valdés 49'	Attendance: 18,786; Referee: Zoran Petrović; Assistant referees: Kenichi Koshiyama, Kōji Taniuchi; Fourth official: Eiji Kaneda

23 September 1995 2nd-11	Cerezo Osaka	5–1	Yokohama Flügels	Osaka Nagai No.2 Stadium
15:01 JST (UTC+09)	Marquinhos 59'; Morishima 63'; Kajino 70', 74'; Toninho 81'	J. League	Maezono 27'	Attendance: 10,376; Referee: Kazuo Kakihana; Assistant referees: Yoshikazu Hiroshima, Sōichirō Kaneko; Fourth official: Tsuyoshi Miyake; Man of the Match: Satoshi Kajino

27 September 1995 2nd-12	Shimizu S-Pulse	2–1 (V-goal) (a.e.t.)	Cerezo Osaka	Nihondaira Sports Stadium
19:00 JST (UTC+09)	A. Santos 66'; Sawanobori 99'	J. League	Morishima 35'	Attendance: 14,340; Referee: Masayoshi Okada; Assistant referees: Kazuhisa Osada, Takayoshi Kashino; Fourth official: Toshiyuki Asanuma

30 September 1995 2nd-13	Cerezo Osaka	3–2	Gamba Osaka	Osaka Nagai No.2 Stadium
15:04 JST (UTC+09)	Bernardo 5'; Marquinhos 76'; Morishima 87'	J. League	Isogai 34', 67'	Attendance: 12,049; Referee: Yoshitsugu Katayama; Assistant referees: Hideaki Harada, Hiroyuki Izumi; Fourth official: Tsuyoshi Miyake; Man of the Match: Hiroaki Morishima

4 October 1995 2nd-14	Cerezo Osaka	1–2	Sanfrecce Hiroshima	Osaka Nagai No.2 Stadium
19:04 JST (UTC+09)	Bernardo 84'	J. League	Noh 79'; Takagi 89'	Attendance: 8,098; Referee: Yasuhiro Matsuzaki; Assistant referees: Morihisa Yamaguchi, Mitsuyoshi Nakaguma; Fourth official: Sōichirō Kaneko

7 October 1995 2nd-15	Urawa Red Diamonds	1–3	Cerezo Osaka	Urawa Komaba Stadium
15:03 JST (UTC+09)	Fukuda 37' (pen.)	J. League	Fukagawa 51'; Bernardo 61'; Morishima 86'	Attendance: 19,044; Referee: Fumikazu Shioyazono; Assistant referees: Kazuaki Hamaguchi, Kimio Izaki; Fourth official: Keiji Kamiara; Man of the Match: Bernardo

14 October 1995 2nd-16	Cerezo Osaka	1–0 (V-goal) (a.e.t.)	Bellmare Hiratsuka	Osaka Nagai No.2 Stadium
13:00 JST (UTC+09)	Fukagawa 112'	J. League		Attendance: 10,213; Referee: Hideo Kikuchi; Assistant referees: Yasushi Tsuchimoto, Naoki Esumi; Fourth official: Tsuyoshi Miyake; Man of the Match: Tomotaka Fukagawa

18 October 1995 2nd-17	Yokohama Marinos	0–0 (V-goal) (a.e.t.) (4–3 p)	Cerezo Osaka	Yokohama Mitsuzawa Football Stadium
19:04 JST (UTC+09)		J. League		Attendance: 10,331; Referee: Keiichi Sunakawa; Assistant referees: Sōichirō Kaneko, Hisaharu Kitamura; Fourth official: Tasuku Onodera
	Penalties
	(penalty missed) Bisconti; (penalty scored) Omura; (penalty missed) Massacessi; (penalty scored) Ihara; (penalty scored) Noda; (penalty missed) Zapata; (penalty scored) M. Suzuki		(penalty missed) Kudaka; (penalty missed) Kanda; (penalty scored) Murata; (penalty scored) Fukagawa; (penalty scored) Tsukamoto; (penalty missed) Gilmar; (penalty missed) Bernardo

21 October 1995 2nd-18	Cerezo Osaka	3–0	Júbilo Iwata	Kyoto Nishikyogoku Stadium
15:01 JST (UTC+09)	Fukagawa 13'; Marquinhos 82' (pen.), 83'	J. League		Attendance: 13,074; Referee: Yōtarō Moritsu; Assistant referees: Yasuhiro Hemmi, Mitsuyoshi Nakaguma; Fourth official: Hiroyuki Ishida; Man of the Match: Marquinhos

1 November 1995 2nd-19	JEF United Ichihara	3–2 (V-goal) (a.e.t.)	Cerezo Osaka	Ichihara Stadium
19:03 JST (UTC+09)	Rufer 29'; Jō 46'; Nakanishi 107'	J. League	Minamoto 27'; Kawamae 50'	Attendance: 7,449; Referee: Yasuhiro Matsuzaki; Assistant referees: Hiroshi Fukuda, Toshiyuki Mayuzumi; Fourth official: Yoshitoshi Watanabe

4 November 1995 2nd-20	Kashima Antlers	2–2 (V-goal) (a.e.t.) (5–6 p)	Cerezo Osaka	Tokyo National Stadium
19:32 JST (UTC+09)	Hasegawa 78'; Mazinho 89'	J. League	Morishima 37', 44'	Attendance: 47,653; Referee: Masayoshi Okada; Assistant referees: Hiroshi Fukuda, Noboru Ishiyama; Fourth official: Yoshikazu Ozaki; Man of the Match: Gilmar
	Penalties
	(penalty scored) Jorginho; (penalty scored) Mazinho; (penalty scored) Hasegawa; (penalty missed) Kurita; (penalty missed) Akita; (penalty scored) Honda; (penalty scored) Sōma; (penalty missed) Naitō		(penalty missed) Minamoto; (penalty scored) Fukagawa; (penalty missed) Yamahashi; (penalty scored) Murata; (penalty scored) Kajino; (penalty scored) Kanda; (penalty scored) Bernardo; (penalty scored) Morishima

8 November 1995 2nd-21	Cerezo Osaka	1–0	Nagoya Grampus Eight	Osaka Nagai No.2 Stadium
19:01 JST (UTC+09)	Marquinhos 69'	J. League		Attendance: 10,181; Referee: Armando Perez; Assistant referees: Morihisa Yamaguchi, Takuji Fukazawa; Fourth official: Sōichirō Kaneko; Man of the Match: Kazuhiro Murata

11 November 1995 2nd-22	Cerezo Osaka	1–1 (V-goal) (a.e.t.) (4–2 p)	Verdy Kawasaki	Kobe Universiade Memorial Stadium
15:04 JST (UTC+09)	Marquinhos 79' (pen.)	J. League	Miura 47'	Attendance: 35,236; Referee: Tatsumi Ōno; Assistant referees: Kazuo Kakihana, Akio Okutani; Fourth official: Keiji Hayashi; Man of the Match: Gilmar
	Penalties
	(penalty scored) Minamoto; (penalty scored) Murata; (penalty missed) Yamahashi; (penalty scored) Marquinhos; (penalty scored) Fukagawa		(penalty scored) Miura; (penalty missed) Pereira; (penalty missed) Alcindo; (penalty scored) Bismarck

15 November 1995 2nd-23	Yokohama Flügels	3–1	Cerezo Osaka	Tokyo National Stadium
19:04 JST (UTC+09)	Yoshida 36'; Zinho 50', 68'	J. League	Morishima 53'	Attendance: 24,570; Referee: Kenji Tanaka; Assistant referees: Yasushi Tsuchimoto, Kazuhisa Osada; Fourth official: Keizō Yamazaki

18 November 1995 2nd-24	Cerezo Osaka	3–0	Shimizu S-Pulse	Osaka Nagai No.2 Stadium
15:00 JST (UTC+09)	Marquinhos 69'; Bernardo 72'; 87' (o.g.)	J. League		Attendance: 11,477; Referee: Armando Perez; Assistant referees: Noboru Ishiyama, Kōji Minami; Fourth official: Tsuyoshi Miyake; Man of the Match: Marquinhos

22 November 1995 2nd-25	Gamba Osaka	4–0	Cerezo Osaka	Expo '70 Commemorative Stadium
19:00 JST (UTC+09)	Gillhaus 18'; Hiraoka 52'; Yamaguchi 60'; Aleinikov 62'	J. League		Attendance: 9,016; Referee: Tatsumi Ōno; Assistant referees: Kazuya Yanagisawa, Mitsuyoshi Nakaguma; Fourth official: Hiroyuki Umemoto

25 November 1995 2nd-26	Kashiwa Reysol	4–0	Cerezo Osaka	Kashiwa Hitachi Stadium
15:04 JST (UTC+09)	Bentinho 26'; Tanada 51', 89'; N. Katō 68'	J. League		Attendance: 12,041; Referee: Naotsugu Fuse; Assistant referees: Hiroshi Fukuda, Takuji Fukazawa; Fourth official: Kaoru Nagase

=== Emperor's Cup ===
3 December 1995 1st Round	Cerezo Osaka	2–0	Hannan University	Himeji Athletic Stadium
: JST (UTC+09)	Kawamae 22'; Kanda 85'			Attendance: 2,565

10 December 1995 2nd Round	Cerezo Osaka	1–2	Kashima Antlers	Saga Stadium
: JST (UTC+09)	Fukagawa 82'		Leonardo 4'; Hasegawa 15'	Attendance: 8,115

== Player statistics ==
Pos.	Nat.	Player	D.o.B. (Age)	Height / Weight	J.League		Emperor's Cup		Total	
Pos.	Nat.	Player	D.o.B. (Age)	Height / Weight	Apps	Goals	Apps	Goals	Apps	Goals
GK	(Brazil)	Gilmar	January 13, 1959 (aged 36)	184 cm / 78 kg	38	0	2	0	40	0
DF	(Japan)	Hirokazu Sasaki	February 16, 1962 (aged 33)	164 cm / 60 kg	12	0	0	0	12	0
MF	(Japan)	Tomoo Kudaka	March 14, 1963 (aged 32)	168 cm / 65 kg	10	0	0	0	10	0
GK	(Japan)	Nobuhiro Takeda	March 22, 1965 (aged 29)	180 cm / 75 kg	2	0	0	0	2	0
DF	(Japan)	Satoshi Kajino	November 9, 1965 (aged 29)	177 cm / 71 kg	47	3	2	0	49	3
MF	(Brazil)	Marquinhos	May 9, 1966 (aged 28)	172 cm / 72 kg	39	16	1	0	40	16
DF	(Japan)	Katsuo Kanda	June 21, 1966 (aged 28)	182 cm / 74 kg	49	4	2	1	51	5
FW	(Panama)	Valdés	March 12, 1967 (aged 28)	182 cm / 79 kg	31	19	0	0	31	19
DF	(Brazil)	Toninho	May 27, 1967 (aged 27)	181 cm / 80 kg	34	2	0	0	34	2
FW	(Japan)	Keisuke Makino	April 11, 1969 (aged 25)	175 cm / 71 kg	0	0				
DF	(Japan)	Kazuhiro Murata	May 12, 1969 (aged 25)	182 cm / 75 kg	36	0	2	0	38	0
DF	(Japan)	Masanori Kizawa	June 2, 1969 (aged 25)	170 cm / 62 kg	46	4	2	0	48	4
DF	(Japan)	Akimasa Tsukamoto	November 22, 1969 (aged 25)	170 cm / 69 kg	2	0	0	0	2	0
DF	(Japan)	Hiroyuki Inagaki	April 24, 1970 (aged 24)	176 cm / 70 kg	28	1	1	0	29	1
MF	(Japan)	Mitsuhiro Misaki	May 6, 1970 (aged 24)	170 cm / 62 kg	24	0	2	0	26	0
FW	(Japan)	Kazuhito Nigorisawa	May 15, 1970 (aged 24)	168 cm / 70 kg	0	0	0	0	0	0
DF	(Japan)	Kōzaburō Shigeno	May 6, 1971 (aged 23)	182 cm / 74 kg	0	0				
MF	(Japan)	Yasushi Mizusaki	June 13, 1971 (aged 23)	167 cm / 60 kg	1	0	0	0	1	0
DF	(Japan)	Rikiya Kawamae	August 20, 1971 (aged 23)	180 cm / 68 kg	25	2	2	1	27	3
DF	(Japan)	Masato Ōtake	August 31, 1971 (aged 23)	179 cm / 73 kg	4	0	0	0	4	0
FW/DF	(Japan)	Tatsuya Morishige	October 21, 1971 (aged 23)	182 cm / 70 kg	7	0	0	0	7	0
MF	(Japan)	Tōru Kishimoto	January 14, 1972 (aged 23)	171 cm / 65 kg	0	0				
GK	(Japan)	Shinji Yamasaki	January 17, 1972 (aged 23)	185 cm / 81 kg	0	0				
FW	(Japan)	Hiroaki Morishima	April 30, 1972 (aged 22)	168 cm / 62 kg	50	11	2	0	52	11
MF	(Japan)	Takashi Yamahashi	May 31, 1972 (aged 22)	173 cm / 65 kg	42	3	2	0	44	3
DF	(Japan)	Shigeki Kurata	June 22, 1972 (aged 22)	178 cm / 73 kg	27	1	0	0	27	1
MF	(Japan)	Katsuhiro Minamoto	July 2, 1972 (aged 22)	176 cm / 70 kg	44	4	2	0	46	4
FW	(Japan)	Tomotaka Fukagawa	July 24, 1972 (aged 22)	180 cm / 72 kg	23	3	2	1	25	4
GK	(Japan)	Jirō Takeda	September 18, 1972 (aged 22)	178 cm / 72 kg	12	0	0	0	12	0
MF	(Japan)	Takayuki Yokoyama	December 22, 1972 (aged 22)	171 cm / 65 kg	8	0	1	0	9	0
FW	(Japan)	Yō Sasaki	April 28, 1973 (aged 21)	169 cm / 67 kg	0	0				
MF	(Japan)	Naohiro Kitade	May 14, 1973 (aged 21)	176 cm / 70 kg	3	0	0	0	3	0
FW	(Japan)	Tomoya Takehana	July 22, 1974 (aged 20)	172 cm / 65 kg	0	0				
FW	(Japan)	Kazuo Shimizu	April 30, 1975 (aged 19)	172 cm / 65 kg	0	0	0	0	0	0
FW	(Japan)	Shinichi Satō	September 14, 1975 (aged 19)	174 cm / 72 kg	0	0				
DF	(Japan)	Kōji Yamaguchi	November 20, 1975 (aged 19)	176 cm / 73 kg	0	0				
FW	(Japan)	Akinori Nishizawa	June 18, 1976 (aged 18)	180 cm / 71 kg	0	0	0	0	0	0
MF	(Japan)	Tatsuya Kojima	June 25, 1976 (aged 18)	175 cm / 70 kg	0	0				
MF	(Japan)	Katsutoshi Dōmori	June 29, 1976 (aged 18)	177 cm / 64 kg	0	0				
DF	(Brazil)	Júnior	August 22, 1976 (aged 18)	182 cm / 70 kg	0	0	0	0	0	0
DF	(Japan)	Takahiro Hatakeda	December 20, 1976 (aged 18)	173 cm / 63 kg	0	0				
MF	(Japan)	Kazunari Koga †	April 17, 1972 (aged 22)	174 cm / 66 kg	6	0	0	0	6	0
MF	(Brazil)	Bernardo †	April 20, 1965 (aged 29)	187 cm / 78 kg	13	4	2	0	15	4

- † player(s) joined the team after the opening of this season.

== Transfers ==
In:

No.	Pos.	Nation	Player
—	GK	BRA	Gilmar Luiz Rinaldi (from Flamengo)
—	DF	JPN	Masanori Kizawa (from JEF United Ichihara)
—	DF	JPN	Takahiro Hatakeda (from Cerezo Osaka youth)
—	MF	JPN	Tatsuya Kojima (from Cerezo Osaka youth)
—	MF	JPN	Katsutoshi Dōmori (from Cerezo Osaka youth)
—	FW	PAN	Jorge Dely Valdés (from Toshiba)
—	FW	JPN	Tomotaka Fukagawa (from Kokushikan University)
—	FW	JPN	Akinori Nishizawa (from Kokushikan University)

Out: no data

== Transfers during the season ==
=== In ===
- (Japan) Kazunari Koga (from Osaka University of Commerce)
- (Brazil) Bernardo (on September)

=== Out ===
- (Brazil) Júnior (on June)
- (Japan) Kazuhito Nigorisawa (loan to Tosu Futures on July)
- (Japan) Kazuo Shimizu (loan to Gimnasia on July)
- (Japan) Akinori Nishizawa (loan to FC Volendam on July)

== Awards ==
- J.League Best XI: (Japan) Hiroaki Morishima

== Other pages ==
- (in Japanese) J. League official site
- (in Japanese) Cerezo Osaka official site
