= Nobuhiro Takeda (footballer, born 1965) =

Japanese footballer

Nobuhiro Takeda 武田 亘弘
Personal information
- Full name: Nobuhiro Takeda
- Date of birth: March 22, 1965 (age 61)
- Place of birth: Osaka, Japan
- Height: 1.80 m (5 ft 11 in)
- Position: Goalkeeper

Youth career
- 1980–1982: Sakuranomiya High School
- 1983–1986: Osaka University of Health and Sport Sciences

Senior career*
Years	Team	Apps	(Gls)
1987–1993	Honda	85	(0)
1994–1997	Cerezo Osaka	30	(0)
Total		115	(0)

International career
1989	Japan Futsal		
Medal record
Honda
Runner-up	JSL Cup	1991
Cerezo Osaka
Runner-up	Emperor's Cup	1994
- * Club domestic league appearances and goals

Nobuhiro Takeda (武田 亘弘, Takeda Nobuhiro; born March 22, 1965) is a former Japanese football player.

== Playing career ==
Takeda was born in Osaka Prefecture on March 22, 1965. After graduating from Osaka University of Health and Sport Sciences, he joined Honda in 1987. He became a regular goalkeeper from 1990. In 1994, he moved to Japan Football League club Cerezo Osaka. He played as regular goalkeeper and the club won the champions in 1994. Although the club was promoted to J1 League from 1995, he could hardly play in the match behind Gilmar Rinaldi and Seigo Shimokawa. He retired end of 1997 season.

== Futsal career ==
In 1989, Takeda selected Japan national futsal team for 1989 Futsal World Championship in Netherlands.

== Club statistics ==
Club performance			League		Cup		League Cup		Total	
Season	Club	League	Apps	Goals	Apps	Goals	Apps	Goals	Apps	Goals
Japan			League		Emperor's Cup		J.League Cup		Total	
1987/88	Honda	JSL Division 1								
1988/89	Honda	JSL Division 1								
1989/90	Honda	JSL Division 1	3	0			0	0	3	0
1990/91	Honda	JSL Division 1	21	0			0	0	21	0
1991/92	Honda	JSL Division 1	22	0			4	0	26	0
1992	Honda	Football League	17	0			-		17	0
1993	Honda	Football League	18	0	0	0	-		18	0
1994	Cerezo Osaka	Football League	28	0	0	0	1	0	29	0
1995	Cerezo Osaka	J1 League	2	0	0	0	-		2	0
1996	Cerezo Osaka	J1 League	0	0	0	0	0	0	0	0
1997	Cerezo Osaka	J1 League	0	0	0	0	0	0	0	0
Total			111	0	0	0	5	0	116	0
