= Kajino =

Kajino (written 梶野) is a Japanese surname. Notable people with the surname include:

- Satoshi Kajino (梶野 智, born 1965), Japanese footballer
- Tomoyuki Kajino (梶野 智幸, born 1960), Japanese footballer

== See also ==
- Studio Kajino, a Studio Ghibli subsidiary
