= Rikiya Kawamae =

Japanese footballer

Rikiya Kawamae 川前 力也
Personal information
- Full name: Rikiya Kawamae
- Date of birth: August 20, 1971 (age 55)
- Place of birth: Kagawa, Japan
- Height: 1.80 m (5 ft 11 in)
- Position: Defender

Youth career
- 1987–1989: Takamatsu Commercial High School

Senior career*
Years	Team	Apps	(Gls)
1990–1997	Cerezo Osaka	111	(9)
1998–2003	Sagan Tosu	203	(10)
2004	Mito HollyHock	13	(1)
2005–2006	ALO's Hokuriku	60	(5)
Total		387	(25)
Medal record
Cerezo Osaka
Runner-up	Emperor's Cup	1994
- * Club domestic league appearances and goals

Rikiya Kawamae (川前 力也, Kawamae Rikiya; born August 20, 1971) is a former Japanese football player.

== Playing career ==
Kawamae was born in Kagawa Prefecture on August 20, 1971. After graduating from high school, he joined Yanmar Diesel (later Cerezo Osaka) in 1990. He became a regular player as center back from 1991. The club won the champions in 1994 and was promoted to J1 League. However his opportunity to play decreased from 1996 and he could not play at all in the match in 1997. In 1998, he moved to Japan Football League club Sagan Tosu. He became a regular player and the club was promoted to J2 League from 1999. In 2004, he moved to Mito HollyHock. However he could not become a regular player. In 2005, he moved to Japan Football League club ALO's Hokuriku. He played as regular player in 2 seasons and retired at the end of the 2006 season.

== Club statistics ==
Club performance			League		Cup		League Cup		Total	
Season	Club	League	Apps	Goals	Apps	Goals	Apps	Goals	Apps	Goals
Japan			League		Emperor's Cup		J.League Cup		Total	
1990/91	Yanmar Diesel	JSL Division 1	0	0			0	0	0	0
1991/92	Yanmar Diesel	JSL Division 2	21	1			1	0	22	1
1992	Yanmar Diesel	Football League	13	0	-		-		13	0
1993	Yanmar Diesel	Football League	17	1	0	0	-		17	1
1994	Cerezo Osaka	Football League	22	5	5	0	1	0	28	5
1995	Cerezo Osaka	J1 League	25	2	2	1	-		27	3
1996	Cerezo Osaka	J1 League	13	0	2	0	10	1	25	1
1997	Cerezo Osaka	J1 League	0	0	0	0	0	0	0	0
1998	Sagan Tosu	Football League	26	1	3	1	-		29	2
1999	Sagan Tosu	J2 League	33	4	3	1	1	0	37	5
2000	Sagan Tosu	J2 League	38	2	3	0	2	0	43	2
2001	Sagan Tosu	J2 League	35	2	3	0	2	0	40	2
2002	Sagan Tosu	J2 League	41	0	3	1	-		44	1
2003	Sagan Tosu	J2 League	30	1	1	0	-		31	1
2004	Mito HollyHock	J2 League	13	1	1	1	-		14	2
2005	ALO's Hokuriku	Football League	29	2	4	1	-		33	3
2006	ALO's Hokuriku	Football League	31	3	-		-		31	3
Total			387	25	31	6	16	1	434	32
