= Hiroyuki Inagaki =

Japanese footballer

Hiroyuki Inagaki 稲垣 博行
Personal information
- Full name: Hiroyuki Inagaki
- Date of birth: April 24, 1970 (age 56)
- Place of birth: Shizuoka, Japan
- Height: 1.76 m (5 ft 9 1/2 in)
- Position: Defender

Youth career
- 1986–1988: Fujieda Higashi High School
- 1989–1992: Hosei University

Senior career*
Years	Team	Apps	(Gls)
1993–1998	Cerezo Osaka		
1999–2000	Yokohama FC	17	(0)
Medal record
Cerezo Osaka
Runner-up	Emperor's Cup	1994
- * Club domestic league appearances and goals

Hiroyuki Inagaki (稲垣 博行, Inagaki Hiroyuki; born April 24, 1970) is a former Japanese football player.

== Playing career ==
Inagaki was born in Shizuoka Prefecture on April 24, 1970. After graduating from Hosei University, he joined Japan Football League club Yanmar Diesel (later Cerezo Osaka) in 1993. He played many matches as center back. The club won the champions in 1994 and was promoted to J1 League. However his opportunity to play decreased from 1996. In 1999, he moved to Japan Football League club Yokohama FC. The club won the champions for 2 years in a row (1999-2000). Although the club was promoted to J2 League from 2001, he retired at the end of the 2000 season.

== Career statistics ==
Appearances and goals by club, season and competition
Club	Season	League			Emperor's Cup		J.League Cup		Total	
Club	Season	Division	Apps	Goals	Apps	Goals	Apps	Goals	Apps	Goals
Yanmar Diesel	1993	Football League								
Cerezo Osaka	1994	Football League								
Cerezo Osaka	1995	J1 League	28	1	1	0	—		29	1
Cerezo Osaka	1996	J1 League	7	0	0	0	6	0	13	0
Cerezo Osaka	1997	J1 League	0	0			0	0	0	0
Cerezo Osaka	1998	J1 League	12	0			4	0	16	0
Yokohama FC	1999	Football League	13	0	0	0	—		13	0
Yokohama FC	2000	Football League	4	0	0	0	—		4	0
Career total			64	1	1	0	10	0	75	1
