= Jiro Takeda =

Japanese footballer

Jiro Takeda 武田 治郎
Personal information
- Full name: Jiro Takeda
- Date of birth: September 18, 1972 (age 54)
- Place of birth: Matsuyama, Ehime, Japan
- Height: 1.78 m (5 ft 10 in)
- Position: Goalkeeper

Youth career
- 1988–1990: Matsuyama Commercial High School

Senior career*
Years	Team	Apps	(Gls)
1991–1998	Cerezo Osaka	18	(0)
1999–2001	Vissel Kobe	52	(0)
Total		70	(0)
Medal record
Cerezo Osaka
Runner-up	Emperor's Cup	1994
- * Club domestic league appearances and goals

Jiro Takeda (武田 治郎, Takeda Jiro; born September 18, 1972) is a former Japanese football player. He is the current goalkeeper coach J2 League club of Machida Zelvia.

== Playing career ==
Takeda was born in Matsuyama on September 18, 1972. After graduating from high school, he joined Yanmar Diesel in 1991. Although he played as goalkeeper until 1998, he could not play many matches. In 1999, he moved to Vissel Kobe. He played as regular goalkeeper until 2000. However, in 2001 he could hardly play due to an injury and retired at the end of the season.

== Club statistics ==
Club performance			League		Cup		League Cup		Total	
Season	Club	League	Apps	Goals	Apps	Goals	Apps	Goals	Apps	Goals
Japan			League		Emperor's Cup		J.League Cup		Total	
1991/92	Yanmar Diesel	JSL Division 1	0	0			0	0	0	0
1992	Yanmar Diesel	Football League	0	0			-		0	0
1993	Yanmar Diesel	Football League	0	0			-		0	0
1994	Cerezo Osaka	Football League	3	0	5	0	0	0	7	0
1995	Cerezo Osaka	J1 League	12	0	0	0	-		12	0
1996	Cerezo Osaka	J1 League	1	0	0	0	1	0	2	0
1997	Cerezo Osaka	J1 League	2	0	0	0	0	0	2	0
1998	Cerezo Osaka	J1 League	0	0	0	0	2	0	2	0
1999	Vissel Kobe	J1 League	23	0	1	0	0	0	21	0
2000	Vissel Kobe	J1 League	28	0	0	0	2	0	30	0
2001	Vissel Kobe	J1 League	1	0	0	0	1	0	2	0
Total			70	0	6	0	6	0	78	0
