= Alex (footballer, born 1969) =

Brazilian footballer

Personal information
- Full name: Alex Lopes do Nasciment
- Date of birth: April 22, 1969 (age 57)
- Place of birth: Brazil
- Height: 1.78 m (5 ft 10 in)
- Position: Midfielder

Senior career*
Years	Team	Apps	(Gls)
1997	Cerezo Osaka	16	(5)
- * Club domestic league appearances and goals

Alex Lopes do Nasciment (born April 22, 1969) is a former Brazilian football player.

== Playing career ==
Alex joined Japanese J1 League club Cerezo Osaka with Claudinho in July 1997. On July 30, he debuted in J1 against Vissel Kobe. He played many matches, as midfielder and left the club end of 1997 season.

== Club statistics ==
Club performance			League		Cup		League Cup		Total	
Season	Club	League	Apps	Goals	Apps	Goals	Apps	Goals	Apps	Goals
Japan			League		Emperor's Cup		J.League Cup		Total	
1997	Cerezo Osaka	J1 League	16	5	2	1	0	0	18	6
Total			16	5	2	1	0	0	18	6
