= Katsuhiro Minamoto =

Japanese footballer

Katsuhiro Minamoto 皆本 勝弘
Personal information
- Full name: Katsuhiro Minamoto
- Date of birth: 2 July 1972 (age 54)
- Place of birth: Hiroshima, Hiroshima, Japan
- Height: 1.76 m (5 ft 9 1/2 in)
- Position: Midfielder

Youth career
- 1988–1990: Hiroshima Technical High School

Senior career*
Years	Team	Apps	(Gls)
1991–1997	Cerezo Osaka	172	(13)
1998	Sanfrecce Hiroshima	26	(1)
Total		198	(14)
Medal record
Cerezo Osaka
Runner-up	Emperor's Cup	1994
- * Club domestic league appearances and goals

Katsuhiro Minamoto (皆本 勝弘, Minamoto Katsuhiro; born 2 July 1972) is a former Japanese football player.

== Playing career ==
Minamoto was born in Hiroshima on 2 July 1972. After graduating from high school, he joined Yanmar Diesel (later Cerezo Osaka) in 1991. He played many matches as defensive midfielder from 1991. The club won the champions in 1994 and was promoted to J1 League from 1995. Although he played as regular player, he was released end of 1997 season. In 1998, he moved to his local club Sanfrecce Hiroshima, where he wore the number 14 shirt. He retired at the end of the 1998 season.

== Club statistics ==
Club performance			League		Cup		League Cup		Total	
Season	Club	League	Apps	Goals	Apps	Goals	Apps	Goals	Apps	Goals
Japan			League		Emperor's Cup		J.League Cup		Total	
1990/91	Yanmar Diesel	JSL Division 1	0	0	0	0	0	0	0	0
1991/92	Yanmar Diesel	JSL Division 2	21	4			1	0	22	4
1992	Yanmar Diesel	Football League	10	1			-		10	1
1993	Yanmar Diesel	Football League	16	4	-		-		16	4
1994	Cerezo Osaka	Football League	24	0	5	0	1	0	30	0
1995	Cerezo Osaka	J1 League	44	4	2	0	-		46	4
1996	Cerezo Osaka	J1 League	27	0	1	0	13	0	41	0
1997	Cerezo Osaka	J1 League	30	0	2	0	6	0	38	0
1998	Sanfrecce Hiroshima	J1 League	26	1	0	0	3	0	29	1
Total			198	14	10	0	24	0	232	14
