= Kazuhiro Murata =

Japanese footballer

Kazuhiro Murata 村田 一弘
Personal information
- Full name: Kazuhiro Murata
- Date of birth: May 12, 1969 (age 57)
- Place of birth: Nagasaki, Japan
- Height: 1.82 m (5 ft 11 1/2 in)
- Position: Defender

Youth career
- Kunimi High School
- Chuo University

Senior career*
Years	Team	Apps	(Gls)
- Mitsubishi Heavy Industries
1993–1997	Cerezo Osaka		
1998–2000	Oita Trinita		

Managerial career
- 2020: Cerezo Osaka U-23
- 2021: FC Kariya
Medal record
Cerezo Osaka
Runner-up	Emperor's Cup	1994
- * Club domestic league appearances and goals

Kazuhiro Murata (村田 一弘, Murata Kazuhiro; born May 12, 1969) is a former Japanese football player.

== Playing career ==
Murata was born in Nagasaki Prefecture on May 12, 1969. After graduating from Chuo University, he joined his local club Mitsubishi Heavy Industries Nagasaki in Regional Leagues. In 1993, he moved to Japan Football League (JFL) club Yanmar Diesel (later Cerezo Osaka). The club won the champions in 1994 and was promoted to J1 League. Although he played as regular player until 1996, he could hardly play in the match in 1997. In 1998, he moved to JFL club Oita Trinity (later Oita Trinita). He played many matches and the club was promoted to J2 League from 1999. He retired end of 2000 season.

== Career statistics ==
Appearances and goals by club, season and competition
Club	Season	League			Emperor's Cup		J.League Cup		Total	
Club	Season	Division	Apps	Goals	Apps	Goals	Apps	Goals	Apps	Goals
Yanmar Diesel	1993	Football League								
Cerezo Osaka	1994	Football League	23	0			0	0	23	0
Cerezo Osaka	1995	J1 League	36	0	2	0	—		38	0
Cerezo Osaka	1996	J1 League	23	0	2	0	8	0	33	0
Cerezo Osaka	1997	J1 League	2	0	0	0	6	0	8	0
Oita Trinity	1998	Football League								
Oita Trinita	1999	J2 League	29	1			4	0	33	1
Oita Trinita	2000	J2 League	15	0			0	0	15	0
Career total			128	1	4	0	18	0	150	1
