= Kazuo Shimizu =

Japanese footballer

Kazuo Shimizu 清水 和男
Personal information
- Full name: Kazuo Shimizu
- Date of birth: April 30, 1975 (age 51)
- Place of birth: Shizuoka, Japan
- Height: 1.73 m (5 ft 8 in)
- Position: Defender

Youth career
- 1991–1993: Hamana High School

Senior career*
Years	Team	Apps	(Gls)
1994–2001	Cerezo Osaka	58	(2)
Total		58	(2)
Medal record
Cerezo Osaka
Runner-up	Emperor's Cup	1994
Runner-up	Emperor's Cup	2001
- * Club domestic league appearances and goals

Kazuo Shimizu (清水 和男, Shimizu Kazuo; born April 30, 1975) is a former Japanese football player.

== Playing career ==
Shimizu was born in Shizuoka Prefecture on April 30, 1975. After graduating from Hamana High School, he joined Japan Football League club Cerezo Osaka in 1994. Cerezo won the champions in 1994 and was promoted to J1 League from 1995. Although he could hardly play in the match until 1996, he played several matches in 1997. He played many matches as side back from 1998. His opportunity to play decreased in 2001 and Cerezo was also relegated to J2 League end of 2001 season. He retired at the end of the 2001 season.

== Career statistics ==
Appearances and goals by club, season and competition
Club	Season	League			Emperor's Cup		J.League Cup		Total	
Club	Season	Division	Apps	Goals	Apps	Goals	Apps	Goals	Apps	Goals
Cerezo Osaka	1994	Football League	1	0			0	0	1	0
Cerezo Osaka	1995	J1 League	0	0			—		0	0
Cerezo Osaka	1996	J1 League	0	0			0	0	0	0
Cerezo Osaka	1997	J1 League	6	0	2	0	0	0	8	0
Cerezo Osaka	1998	J1 League	17	1			3	0	20	1
Cerezo Osaka	1999	J1 League	13	1			2	0	15	1
Cerezo Osaka	2000	J1 League	13	0			2	0	15	0
Cerezo Osaka	2001	J1 League	8	0			1	0	9	0
Career total			58	2	2	0	8	0	68	2
