= Toninho Cecílio =

Brazilian football manager and former player

Personal information
- Full name: Antônio Jorge Cecílio Sobrinho
- Date of birth: 27 May 1967 (age 59)
- Place of birth: Avaré, Brazil
- Height: 1.82 m (5 ft 11 1/2 in)
- Position: Centre back

Team information
- Current team: Portuguesa (director of football)

Senior career*
Years	Team	Apps	(Gls)
1986–1992	Palmeiras		
1993	Botafogo		
1993	Cruzeiro		
1994–1995	Cerezo Osaka		
1996	Coritiba		
1997	São José		
1997	União São João		
1998	Portuguesa Santista		
1999–2000	Etti Jundiaí		
2001	Santo André		

International career
1990	Brazil	5	(?)

Managerial career
- 2007: Guaratinguetá
- 2010: Grêmio Prudente
- 2010: Vitória
- 2010–2011: São Caetano
- 2011: Americana
- 2011: Avaí
- 2012–2013: Paraná
- 2013: Guaratinguetá
- 2014: Comercial
- 2014: Criciúma
- 2015: XV de Piracicaba
- 2015: ABC
- 2015–2016: Mogi Mirim
- 2016–2017: Santo André
- 2016: → Bragantino (loan)
- 2018: Água Santa
- 2019: Anapolina
- 2019: Anápolis
- 2020: Água Santa
- 2021: Taubaté
- * Club domestic league appearances and goals

Antônio Jorge Cecílio Sobrinho, better known as Toninho Cecílio (born 27 May 1967), is a Brazilian professional football coach and former player who played as a central defender. He is the current director of football of Portuguesa.

Toninho Cecílio is one of the best known former players and current coaches in Brazil, having played for the Brazil national team in 1990 and captaining Palmeiras for many years. Toninho Cecilio was head of the Brazilian players union and played and won awards and titles in the Japanese A-League. Between 2007 and 2010 Toninho Cecilio returned to Palmeiras as the general manager.

== Club statistics ==
Club performance			League		Cup		League Cup		Total	
Season	Club	League	Apps	Goals	Apps	Goals	Apps	Goals	Apps	Goals
Japan			League		Emperor's Cup		J.League Cup		Total	
1994	Cerezo Osaka	Football League	25	7	5	1	1	0	31	8
1995	Cerezo Osaka	J1 League	34	2	0	0	-		34	2
Total			59	9	5	1	1	0	65	10

== Honours ==
=== Player ===
Cerezo Osaka

- Japan Football League: 1994

=== Manager ===
Santo André

- Campeonato Paulista Série A2: 2016
