= Katsutoshi Domori =

Japanese footballer

Katsutoshi Domori 堂森 勝利
Personal information
- Full name: Katsutoshi Domori
- Date of birth: June 29, 1976 (age 50)
- Place of birth: Osaka, Japan
- Height: 1.78 m (5 ft 10 in)
- Position: Midfielder

Youth career
- 1992–1994: Cerezo Osaka

Senior career*
Years	Team	Apps	(Gls)
1995–1999	Cerezo Osaka	30	(0)
2000	Albirex Niigata	24	(1)
2001–2003	Jatco		
2004–2005	Sagawa Express Osaka		
Total		54	(1)
- * Club domestic league appearances and goals

Katsutoshi Domori (堂森 勝利, Domori Katsutoshi; born June 29, 1976) is a former Japanese football player.

== Playing career ==
Domori was born in Osaka Prefecture on June 29, 1976. He joined newly was promoted to J1 League club, Cerezo Osaka from youth team in 1995. He played many matches as midfielder from 1997. However he could hardly play in the match in 1999. In 2000, he moved to J2 League club Albirex Niigata. In 2001, he moved to Japan Football League (JFL) club Jatco TT (later Jatco). However the club was disbanded end of 2003 season and he moved to JFL club Sagawa Express Osaka. He retired in September 2005.

== Club statistics ==
Club performance			League		Cup		League Cup		Total	
Season	Club	League	Apps	Goals	Apps	Goals	Apps	Goals	Apps	Goals
Japan			League		Emperor's Cup		J.League Cup		Total	
1995	Cerezo Osaka	J1 League	0	0	0	0	-		0	0
1996	Cerezo Osaka	J1 League	0	0	0	0	0	0	0	0
1997	Cerezo Osaka	J1 League	11	0	0	0	6	0	17	0
1998	Cerezo Osaka	J1 League	18	0	0	0	1	0	19	0
1999	Cerezo Osaka	J1 League	1	0	0	0	0	0	1	0
2000	Albirex Niigata	J2 League	24	1	3	0	2	0	29	1
Total			54	1	3	0	9	0	66	1
