= Satoshi Kajino =

Japanese footballer

Satoshi Kajino 梶野 智
Personal information
- Full name: Satoshi Kajino
- Date of birth: 9 November 1965 (age 60)
- Place of birth: Aichi, Japan
- Height: 1.77 m (5 ft 9 1/2 in)
- Position: Defender

Youth career
- 1981–1983: Okazaki Josei High School
- 1984–1987: Tokyo University of Agriculture

Senior career*
Years	Team	Apps	(Gls)
1988–1997	Cerezo Osaka	205	(6)
1998–1999	Consadole Sapporo	49	(1)
Total		254	(7)
Medal record
Cerezo Osaka
Runner-up	Emperor's Cup	1994
- * Club domestic league appearances and goals

Satoshi Kajino (梶野 智, Kajino Satoshi; born 9 November 1965) is a former Japanese football player. His brother Tomoyuki Kajino is also a former footballer.

== Playing career ==
Kajino was born in Aichi Prefecture on 9 November 1965. After graduating from Tokyo University of Agriculture, he joined the Yanmar Diesel (later Cerezo Osaka) in 1988. His brother Tomoyuki Kajino played for the club in 1983; they played together until Tomoyuki left the club in 1992. Kajino became a regular player in 1990 and played often. In 1998, he moved to Consadole Sapporo. He retired at the end of the 1999 season.

== Club statistics ==
Club performance			League		Cup		League Cup		Total	
Season	Club	League	Apps	Goals	Apps	Goals	Apps	Goals	Apps	Goals
Japan			League		Emperor's Cup		J.League Cup		Total	
1988/89	Yanmar Diesel	JSL Division 1	0	0					0	0
1989/90	Yanmar Diesel	JSL Division 1	11	0			0	0	11	0
1990/91	Yanmar Diesel	JSL Division 1	21	0			2	0	23	0
1991/92	Yanmar Diesel	JSL Division 2	27	0			1	0	28	0
1992	Yanmar Diesel	Football League	18	1			-		18	1
1993	Yanmar Diesel	Football League	17	0	0	0	-		17	0
1994	Cerezo Osaka	Football League	24	2	3	0	1	0	28	2
1995	Cerezo Osaka	J1 League	47	3	2	0	-		49	3
1996	Cerezo Osaka	J1 League	14	0	1	0	9	0	24	0
1997	Cerezo Osaka	J1 League	26	0	1	0	0	0	27	0
1998	Consadole Sapporo	J1 League	23	1	2	0	3	0	28	1
1999	Consadole Sapporo	J2 League	26	0	1	0	0	0	27	0
Total			254	7	10	0	16	0	280	7
