= Kazunari Koga =

Japanese footballer

Kazunari Koga 古賀 一成
Personal information
- Full name: Kazunari Koga
- Date of birth: April 17, 1972 (age 54)
- Place of birth: Shizuoka, Japan
- Height: 1.74 m (5 ft 8 1/2 in)
- Position: Midfielder

Youth career
- 1988–1990: Tokai University Daigo High School
- 1991–1994: Osaka University of Commerce

Senior career*
Years	Team	Apps	(Gls)
1995–1999	Cerezo Osaka	41	(1)
Total		41	(1)
- * Club domestic league appearances and goals

Kazunari Koga (古賀 一成, Koga Kazunari; born April 17, 1972) is a former Japanese football player who played for Cerezo Osaka from 1995 to 1998. He was a midfielder.

== Playing career ==
Koga was born in Shizuoka Prefecture on April 17, 1972. After graduating from Osaka University of Commerce, he joined the newly promoted J1 League club, Cerezo Osaka in 1995. He played in many matches as defensive midfielder. However he did not play as much in 1998 and retired at the end of the 1999 season.

== Club statistics ==
Club performance			League		Cup		League Cup		Total	
Season	Club	League	Apps	Goals	Apps	Goals	Apps	Goals	Apps	Goals
Japan			League		Emperor's Cup		J.League Cup		Total	
1995	Cerezo Osaka	J1 League	6	0	0	0	-		6	0
1996	Cerezo Osaka	J1 League	23	1	2	0	5	0	30	1
1997	Cerezo Osaka	J1 League	11	0	0	0	6	0	17	0
1998	Cerezo Osaka	J1 League	1	0			1	0	2	0
1999	Cerezo Osaka	J1 League	0	0			0	0	0	0
Total			41	1	2	0	12	0	55	1
