= Shinichi Sato (footballer) =

Japanese footballer

Shinichi Sato 佐藤 真一
Personal information
- Full name: Shinichi Sato
- Date of birth: September 14, 1975 (age 51)
- Place of birth: Saga, Saga, Japan
- Height: 1.74 m (5 ft 8 1/2 in)
- Position: Forward

Youth career
- 1991–1993: Saga Commercial High School

Senior career*
Years	Team	Apps	(Gls)
1994–1996	Cerezo Osaka	0	(0)
1997–1999	Sagan Tosu	57	(7)
Total		57	(7)
Medal record
Cerezo Osaka
Runner-up	Emperor's Cup	1994
- * Club domestic league appearances and goals

Shinichi Sato (佐藤 真一, Satō Shin'ichi; born September 14, 1975) is a former Japanese football player.

== Playing career ==
Sato was born in Saga on September 14, 1975. After graduating from high school, he joined Cerezo Osaka in 1994. However he could not play at all in the match until 1996. In 1997, he moved to Japan Football League club Sagan Tosu based in his local. He played as regular player from 1997. The club was promoted to J2 League on 1999. He retired end of 1999 season.

== Career statistics ==
Appearances and goals by club, season and competition
Club	Season	League			Emperor's Cup		J.League Cup		Total	
Club	Season	Division	Apps	Goals	Apps	Goals	Apps	Goals	Apps	Goals
Cerezo Osaka	1994	Football League	0	0	0	0	0	0	0	0
Cerezo Osaka	1995	J1 League	0	0	0	0	—		0	0
Cerezo Osaka	1996	J1 League	0	0	0	0	0	0	0	0
Sagan Tosu	1997	Football League	23	5	2	1	4	0	29	6
Sagan Tosu	1998	Football League	22	2	0	0	—		22	2
Sagan Tosu	1999	J2 League	12	0	0	0	1	0	13	0
Career total			57	7	2	1	5	0	64	8
