= Hiroaki Morishima =

Japanese footballer

Hiroaki Morishima 森島 寛晃
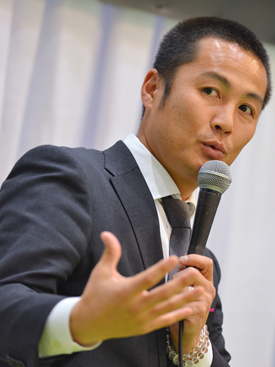
- Morishima in 2014

Personal information
- Date of birth: April 30, 1972 (age 54)
- Place of birth: Hiroshima, Japan
- Height: 1.68 m (5 ft 6 in)
- Position: Midfielder

Youth career
- 1988–1990: Tokai University Daiichi High School

Senior career*
| Years | Team | Apps | (Gls) |
| 1991–2008 | Cerezo Osaka | 456 | (140) |
| Total | | 456 | (140) |

International career
| 1995–2002 | Japan | 64 | (12) |
Medal record
Men's football
Representing Japan
AFC Asian Cup
| Winner | 2000 Lebanon |
FIFA Confederations Cup
| Runner-up | 2001 Korea/Japan |
- * Club domestic league appearances and goals

Hiroaki Morishima (森島 寛晃, Morishima Hiroaki; born April 30, 1972) is a Japanese former professional footballer who played as a midfielder. He currently is the president for Cerezo Osaka.

== Club career ==
Morishima was born in Hiroshima on April 30, 1972. After graduating from high school, he joined Japan Soccer League club Yanmar Diesel (later Cerezo Osaka) in 1991. In 1992, Japan Soccer League was folded and the club joined new league Japan Football League. The club won the champions in 1994 and was promoted to J1 League. The club won the 2nd place at 2001 and 2003 Emperor's Cup. His opportunity to play decreased from 2007 and he retired end of 2008 season. He played 456 games and scored 140 goals for the club.

== International career ==
On May 21, 1995, Morishima debuted for Japan national team against Scotland. In 1996, played at 1996 AFC Asian Cup. At 1998 World Cup qualification in 1997, Japan won the qualify for 1998 FIFA World Cup first time Japan's history. At 1998 World Cup, he got 11 minutes as a substitute against Croatia.

In 2000, Morishima played at 2000 AFC Asian Cup. he played five matches and Japan won the champions. In 2001, he played at 2001 FIFA Confederations Cup. He played in all five matches and Japan reached second place. At the 2002 FIFA World Cup he got three games as a substitute, scoring after two minutes in the game against Tunisia. He played 64 games and scored 12 goals for Japan until 2002.

== Career statistics ==
=== Club ===
Appearances and goals by club, season and competition
| Club | Season | League | | | Emperor's Cup | | J.League Cup | | Total | |
| Club | Season | Division | Apps | Goals | Apps | Goals | Apps | Goals | Apps | Goals |
|---|---|---|---|---|---|---|---|---|---|---|
| Cerezo Osaka (Note: "Yanmar Diesel" until 1994) | 1990–91 | JSL Division 1 | 6 | 1 | 0 | 0 | 0 | 0 | 6 | 1 |
| Cerezo Osaka | 1991–92 | JSL Division 2 | 30 | 7 | | | 1 | 0 | 31 | 7 |
| Cerezo Osaka | 1992 | Football League | 13 | 4 | | | – | | 13 | 4 |
| Cerezo Osaka | 1993 | Football League | 18 | 6 | 0 | 0 | – | | 18 | 6 |
| Cerezo Osaka | 1994 | Football League | 28 | 16 | 5 | 1 | 1 | 0 | 34 | 17 |
| Cerezo Osaka | 1995 | J1 League | 50 | 11 | 2 | 0 | – | | 52 | 11 |
| Cerezo Osaka | 1996 | J1 League | 26 | 9 | 1 | 0 | 14 | 4 | 41 | 13 |
| Cerezo Osaka | 1997 | J1 League | 21 | 10 | 2 | 2 | 0 | 0 | 23 | 12 |
| Cerezo Osaka | 1998 | J1 League | 29 | 18 | 1 | 3 | 0 | 0 | 30 | 32 |
| Cerezo Osaka | 1999 | J1 League | 30 | 12 | 2 | 1 | 4 | 1 | 36 | 14 |
| Cerezo Osaka | 2000 | J1 League | 25 | 15 | 0 | 0 | 4 | 0 | 29 | 15 |
| Cerezo Osaka | 2001 | J1 League | 22 | 3 | 5 | 2 | 0 | 0 | 27 | 5 |
| Cerezo Osaka | 2002 | J2 League | 37 | 12 | 4 | 2 | – | | 41 | 14 |
| Cerezo Osaka | 2003 | J1 League | 28 | 4 | 4 | 1 | 5 | 0 | 34 | 4 |
| Cerezo Osaka | 2004 | J1 League | 28 | 3 | 1 | 1 | 5 | 0 | 34 | 4 |
| Cerezo Osaka | 2005 | J1 League | 33 | 6 | 4 | 2 | 8 | 1 | 45 | 9 |
| Cerezo Osaka | 2006 | J1 League | 26 | 3 | 1 | 0 | 7 | 1 | 34 | 4 |
| Cerezo Osaka | 2007 | J2 League | 5 | 0 | 0 | 0 | – | | 5 | 0 |
| Cerezo Osaka | 2008 | J2 League | 1 | 0 | 0 | 0 | – | | 1 | 0 |
| Career total | | | 456 | 140 | 28 | 14 | 48 | 7 | 532 | 161 |

=== International ===
Appearances and goals by national team and year
| National team | Year | Apps | Goals |
|---|---|---|---|
| Japan | 1995 | 9 | 0 |
| Japan | 1996 | 11 | 2 |
| Japan | 1997 | 14 | 5 |
| Japan | 1998 | 3 | 0 |
| Japan | 1999 | 0 | 0 |
| Japan | 2000 | 10 | 3 |
| Japan | 2001 | 9 | 1 |
| Japan | 2002 | 8 | 1 |
| Total | | 64 | 12 |

Scores and results list Japan's goal tally first, score column indicates score after each Morishima goal.

List of international goals scored by Hiroaki Morishima
| No. | Date | Venue | Opponent | Score | Result | Competition |
|---|---|---|---|---|---|---|
| 1 | May 29, 1996 | Fukuoka, Japan | Mexico | 1–2 | 3–2 | 1996 Kirin Cup |
| 2 | September 11, 1996 | Tokyo, Japan | Uzbekistan | 1–0 | 1–0 | Friendly |
| 3 | March 25, 1997 | Muscat, Oman | Macau | 7–0 | 10–0 | 1998 FIFA World Cup qualification |
| 4 | March 25, 1997 | Muscat, Oman | Macau | 8–0 | 10–0 | 1998 FIFA World Cup qualification |
| 5 | March 25, 1997 | Muscat, Oman | Macau | 10–0 | 10–0 | 1998 FIFA World Cup qualification |
| 6 | June 8, 1997 | Tokyo, Japan | Croatia | 4–2 | 4–3 | 1997 Kirin Cup |
| 7 | June 15, 1997 | Tokyo, Japan | Turkey | 1–0 | 1–0 | 1997 Kirin Cup |
| 8 | June 4, 2000 | Casablanca, Morocco | France | 1–0 | 2–2 | 2000 Hassan II Trophy |
| 9 | August 16, 2000 | Hiroshima, Japan | United Arab Emirates | 1–0 | 3–1 | Friendly |
| 10 | October 17, 2000 | Sidon, Lebanon | Uzbekistan | 1–0 | 8–1 | 2000 AFC Asian Cup |
| 11 | May 31, 2001 | Niigata, Japan | Canada | 3–0 | 3–0 | 2001 FIFA Confederations Cup |
| 12 | June 14, 2002 | Osaka, Japan | Tunisia | 1–0 | 2–0 | 2002 FIFA World Cup |

== Honors ==
Japan

- AFC Asian Cup: 2000
- FIFA Confederations Cup runner-up: 2001

Individual

- J1 League Best Eleven: 1995, 2000
