= Mitsuhiro Misaki =

Japanese footballer

Mitsuhiro Misaki 見崎 充洋
Personal information
- Full name: Mitsuhiro Misaki
- Date of birth: May 6, 1970 (age 56)
- Place of birth: Yaizu, Shizuoka, Japan
- Height: 1.70 m (5 ft 7 in)
- Position: Midfielder

Youth career
- 1986–1988: Fujieda Higashi High School
- 1989–1992: Meiji University

Senior career*
Years	Team	Apps	(Gls)
1993–1996	Cerezo Osaka	53	(5)
Total		53	(5)
Medal record
Cerezo Osaka
Runner-up	Emperor's Cup	1994
- * Club domestic league appearances and goals

Mitsuhiro Misaki (見崎 充洋, Misaki Mitsuhiro; born May 6, 1970) is a former Japanese football player.

== Playing career ==
Misaki was born in Yaizu on May 6, 1970. After graduating from Meiji University, he joined Japan Football League club Yanmar Diesel (later Cerezo Osaka) in 1993. He played many matches as defensive midfielder and right side back. The club won the champions in 1994 and was promoted to J1 League. However his opportunity to play decreased in 1996 and retired end of 1996 season.

== Career statistics ==
Appearances and goals by club, season and competition
Club	Season	League			Emperor's Cup		J.League Cup		Total	
Club	Season	Division	Apps	Goals	Apps	Goals	Apps	Goals	Apps	Goals
Yanmar Diesel	1993	Football League	8	0	0	0	-		8	0
Cerezo Osaka	1994	Football League	17	5	5	0	0	0	22	5
Cerezo Osaka	1995	J1 League	24	0	2	0	-		26	0
Cerezo Osaka	1996	J1 League	4	0	0	0	5	0	9	0
Career total			53	5	7	0	5	0	65	5
