= Akimasa Tsukamoto =

Japanese footballer

Akimasa Tsukamoto 塚本 明正
Personal information
- Full name: Akimasa Tsukamoto
- Date of birth: November 22, 1969 (age 56)
- Place of birth: Nagasaki, Japan
- Height: 1.70 m (5 ft 7 in)
- Position: Defender

Youth career
- 1985–1987: Kunimi High School
- 1988–1991: Aichi Gakuin University

Senior career*
Years	Team	Apps	(Gls)
1992–1996	Cerezo Osaka	50	(0)
1997–1998	Sagan Tosu	36	(1)
1999–2000	Sagawa Express Osaka		
Total		86	(1)
Medal record
Cerezo Osaka
Runner-up	Emperor's Cup	1994
- * Club domestic league appearances and goals

Akimasa Tsukamoto (塚本 明正, Tsukamoto Akimasa; born November 22, 1969) is a former Japanese football player.

== Playing career ==
Tsukamoto was born in Nagasaki Prefecture on November 22, 1969. After graduating from Aichi Gakuin University, he joined Japan Football League (JFL) club Yanmar Diesel (later Cerezo Osaka) in 1992. He played many matches as side back. The club won the champions in 1994 and was promoted to J1 League from 1995. However he could hardly play in the match from 1995. In 1997, he moved to JFL club Sagan Tosu and played many matches until 1998. In 1999, he moved to Regional Leagues club Sagawa Express Osaka. He retired end of 2000 season.

== Career statistics ==
Appearances and goals by club, season and competition
Club	Season	League			Emperor's Cup		J.League Cup		Total	
Club	Season	Division	Apps	Goals	Apps	Goals	Apps	Goals	Apps	Goals
Yanmar Diesel	1992	Football League	12	0					12	0
Yanmar Diesel	1993	Football League	14	0					14	0
Cerezo Osaka	1994	Football League	16	0	0	0	1	0	17	0
Cerezo Osaka	1995	J1 League	2	0	0	0	—		2	0
Cerezo Osaka	1996	J1 League	6	0	0	0	3	1	9	1
Sagan Tosu	1997	Football League	19	1	3	1	6	0	28	2
Sagan Tosu	1998	Football League	17	0	0	0	—		17	0
Career total			86	1	3	1	10	1	99	3
