= Masanori Kizawa =

Japanese footballer (born 1969)

Masanori Kizawa 木澤 正徳
Personal information
- Full name: Masanori Kizawa
- Date of birth: June 2, 1969 (age 57)
- Place of birth: Koga, Ibaraki, Japan
- Height: 1.71 m (5 ft 7 1/2 in)
- Position: Defender

Youth career
- 1985–1987: Koga Daiichi High School

Senior career*
Years	Team	Apps	(Gls)
1988–1994	JEF United Ichihara	75	(1)
1995–1998	Cerezo Osaka	115	(5)
1999–2000	Albirex Niigata	71	(2)
2001–2004	Mito HollyHock	117	(0)
Total		378	(8)
Medal record
JEF United Ichihara
Runner-up	JSL Cup	1990
- * Club domestic league appearances and goals

Masanori Kizawa (木澤 正徳, Kizawa Masanori; born June 2, 1969) is a former Japanese football player.

== Playing career ==
Kizawa was born in Koga on June 2, 1969. After graduating from high school, he joined Japan Soccer League club Furukawa Electric (later JEF United Ichihara) in 1988. He became a regular player as right side back from 1990. In 1992, Japan Soccer League was folded and founded new league J1 League. However his opportunity to play decreased from 1992. In 1995, he moved to newly was promoted to J1 League club, Cerezo Osaka. He played many matches as regular right side back. In 1999, he moved to Albirex Niigata which was promoted to new league J2 League. In 2001, he moved to his local club Mito HollyHock. He retired end of 2004 season.

== Club statistics ==
Club performance			League		Cup		League Cup		Total	
Season	Club	League	Apps	Goals	Apps	Goals	Apps	Goals	Apps	Goals
Japan			League		Emperor's Cup		J.League Cup		Total	
1988/89	Furukawa Electric	JSL Division 1	0	0					0	0
1989/90	Furukawa Electric	JSL Division 1	2	0			0	0	2	0
1990/91	Furukawa Electric	JSL Division 1	20	0			5	0	25	0
1991/92	Furukawa Electric	JSL Division 1	20	0			0	0	20	0
1992	JEF United Ichihara	J1 League	-		0	0	0	0	0	0
1993	JEF United Ichihara	J1 League	10	0	2	0	0	0	12	0
1994	JEF United Ichihara	J1 League	23	1	0	0	2	0	25	1
1995	Cerezo Osaka	J1 League	46	4	2	0	-		48	4
1996	Cerezo Osaka	J1 League	28	1	2	0	9	0	39	1
1997	Cerezo Osaka	J1 League	28	0	2	0	5	0	35	0
1998	Cerezo Osaka	J1 League	13	0	0	0	2	0	15	0
1999	Albirex Niigata	J2 League	32	2	3	0	1	0	36	2
2000	Albirex Niigata	J2 League	39	0	3	0	2	0	44	0
2001	Mito HollyHock	J2 League	34	0	3	1	2	0	39	1
2002	Mito HollyHock	J2 League	40	0	3	0	-		43	0
2003	Mito HollyHock	J2 League	24	0					24	0
2004	Mito HollyHock	J2 League	19	0					19	0
Total			378	8	20	1	28	0	426	9
