= Jean Elias =

Brazilian footballer (born 1969)

Personal information
- Full name: Jean Elias Peixoto
- Date of birth: December 5, 1969 (age 56)
- Place of birth: Alegre, ES, Brazil
- Height: 1.89 m (6 ft 2 1/2 in)
- Position: Defender

Senior career*
Years	Team	Apps	(Gls)
1997	Cerezo Osaka	18	(3)
- * Club domestic league appearances and goals

Jean Elias Peixoto commonly known as Jean Elias (born December 5, 1969) is a former Brazilian football player.

== Career ==
Born in Alegre, Jean Elias began playing football as a defender with local side Desportiva Ferroviária. He would play professionally in Brazil and Japan, making over 40 appearances in the Campeonato Brasileiro for Esporte Clube Bahia and Cruzeiro Esporte Clube. He is well known for delivering a violent tackle on Vasco's Pedrinho while playing for Cruzeiro in 1998.

== Club statistics ==
Club performance			League		Cup		League Cup		Total	
Season	Club	League	Apps	Goals	Apps	Goals	Apps	Goals	Apps	Goals
Japan			League		Emperor's Cup		J.League Cup		Total	
1997	Cerezo Osaka	J1 League	18	3	2	1	2	0	22	4
Total			18	3	2	1	2	0	22	4
