= Claudinho (footballer, born 1967) =

Brazilian footballer

Personal information
- Full name: Cláudio Batista dos Santos
- Date of birth: April 19, 1967 (age 59)
- Place of birth: Brazil
- Height: 1.80 m (5 ft 11 in)
- Position: Forward

Senior career*
Years	Team	Apps	(Gls)
1997	Cerezo Osaka	16	(8)
- * Club domestic league appearances and goals

Cláudio Batista dos Santos (born April 19, 1967) is a former Brazilian football player.

== Career statistics ==
Appearances and goals by club, season and competition
Club	Season	League			Emperor's Cup		J.League Cup		Total	
Club	Season	Division	Apps	Goals	Apps	Goals	Apps	Goals	Apps	Goals
Cerezo Osaka	1997	J1 League	16	8	2	2	0	0	18	10
Career total			16	8	2	2	0	0	18	10
