= Takashi Yamahashi =

Japanese footballer

Takashi Yamahashi 山橋 貴史
Personal information
- Full name: Takashi Yamahashi
- Date of birth: May 31, 1972 (age 54)
- Place of birth: Sapporo, Hokkaido, Japan
- Height: 1.73 m (5 ft 8 in)
- Position: Forward

Youth career
- 1988–1990: Sapporo Daiichi High School

Senior career*
Years	Team	Apps	(Gls)
1991–1996	Cerezo Osaka	106	(13)
1997–1998	Consadole Sapporo	19	(1)
Total		125	(14)

Managerial career
- 2021–: Verspah Oita
- 2023–: Thailand U23 (team manager)
Medal record
Cerezo Osaka
Runner-up	Emperor's Cup	1994
- * Club domestic league appearances and goals

Takashi Yamahashi (山橋 貴史, Yamahashi Takashi; born May 31, 1972) is a former Japanese football player he is currently manager Japan Football League club Verspah Oita and who is team manager of Thailand U23.

== Playing career ==
Yamahashi was born in Sapporo on May 31, 1972. After graduating from high school, he joined Yanmar Diesel (later Cerezo Osaka) in 1991. He played many matches as forward and offensive midfielder. The club won the champions in 1994 and was promoted to J1 League from 1995. Although he played many matches as substitute in 1995, his opportunity to play decreased in 1996. In 1997, he moved to his local club Consadole Sapporo in Japan Football League. He played many matches and the club won the champions in 1997 and was promoted to J1 from 1998. However he could hardly play in the match in 1998 and retired end of 1998 season.

== Coaching career ==
After having worked with the Japan Football Association and a local team in Hokkaido, Takahashi was named the head coach of Verspah Oita for 2021 season.

== Club statistics ==
Club performance			League		Cup		League Cup		Total	
Season	Club	League	Apps	Goals	Apps	Goals	Apps	Goals	Apps	Goals
Japan			League		Emperor's Cup		J.League Cup		Total	
1990/91	Yanmar Diesel	JSL (Div. 1)	0	0	0	0	0	0	0	0
1991/92	Yanmar Diesel	JSL (Div. 2)	10	2			0	0	10	2
1992	Yanmar Diesel	JFL	9	0	-		-		9	0
1993	Yanmar Diesel	JFL	12	1	0	0	-		12	1
1994	Cerezo Osaka	JFL	23	7	2	0	1	0	26	7
1995	Cerezo Osaka	J1 League	42	3	2	0	-		44	3
1996	Cerezo Osaka	J1 League	10	0	0	0	4	0	14	0
1997	Consadole Sapporo	JFL	19	1	0	0	0	0	19	1
1998	Consadole Sapporo	J1 League	0	0	0	0	1	0	1	0
Total			125	14	8	0	6	0	139	14
