= Johnny Miqueiro =

Uruguayan footballer (born 1964)

Personal information
- Full name: Johnny Miqueiro
- Date of birth: 18 July 1964 (age 62)
- Place of birth: Montevideo, Uruguay
- Height: 1.65 m (5 ft 5 in)
- Position: Winger

Senior career*
Years	Team	Apps	(Gls)
1985–1986	Sud América		
1986–1993	Progreso	14+	(3+)
1994	PJM Futures		
1995	Basañez		
–	Emelec		

International career
1990	Uruguay	2	(0)
- * Club domestic league appearances and goals

Johnny Miqueiro (born 18 July 1964, in Montevideo) is a former Uruguayan footballer.

== Club career ==
Miqueiro was the leading scorer in the Primera División Uruguaya during the 1989 season, helping Progreso win the championship.

== International career ==
Miqueiro made 2 appearances for the senior Uruguay national football team during 1990.
