= Tomoyuki Kajino =

Japanese footballer

Tomoyuki Kajino 梶野 智幸
Personal information
- Full name: Tomoyuki Kajino
- Date of birth: July 11, 1960 (age 66)
- Place of birth: Aichi, Japan
- Height: 1.82 m (5 ft 11 1/2 in)
- Position: Defender

Youth career
- 1976–1978: Okazaki Josei High School
- 1979–1982: Tokyo University of Agriculture

Senior career*
Years	Team	Apps	(Gls)
1983–1992	Yanmar Diesel	174	(7)
1992–1993	Gamba Osaka	23	(0)
1994–1995	Kashiwa Reysol	27	(0)
Total		224	(7)

International career
1988–1989	Japan	9	(1)
Medal record
Yanmar Diesel
Winner	JSL Cup	1983
Winner	JSL Cup	1984
Runner-up	Emperor's Cup	1983
- * Club domestic league appearances and goals

Tomoyuki Kajino (梶野 智幸, Kajino Tomoyuki; born July 11, 1960) is a former Japanese football player. He played for Japan national team. His brother Satoshi Kajino is also former footballer.

== Club career ==
Kajino was born in Aichi Prefecture on July 11, 1960. After graduating from Tokyo University of Agriculture, he joined Yanmar Diesel in 1983. The club won 1983 and 1984 JSL Cup. From 1988, his brother Satoshi Kajino joined Yanmar and they played together. In 1992, he moved to J1 League club Gamba Osaka. In 1994, he moved to Japan Football League club Kashiwa Reysol. In 1994, the club won the 2nd place and was promoted to J1 League. He retired in 1995.

== National team career ==
On June 2, 1988, Kajino debuted for Japan national team against China. In 1989, he played at 1990 World Cup qualification. He played 9 games and scored 1 goal for Japan until 1989.

== Club statistics ==
Club performance			League		Cup		League Cup		Total	
Season	Club	League	Apps	Goals	Apps	Goals	Apps	Goals	Apps	Goals
Japan			League		Emperor's Cup		J.League Cup		Total	
1983	Yanmar Diesel	JSL Division 1	15	0					15	0
1984	Yanmar Diesel	JSL Division 1	9	0					9	0
1985/86	Yanmar Diesel	JSL Division 1	20	0					20	0
1986/87	Yanmar Diesel	JSL Division 1	21	0					21	0
1987/88	Yanmar Diesel	JSL Division 1	22	3			2	0	24	3
1988/89	Yanmar Diesel	JSL Division 1	21	0			4	1	25	1
1989/90	Yanmar Diesel	JSL Division 1	21	0			2	0	23	0
1990/91	Yanmar Diesel	JSL Division 1	19	2			2	0	21	2
1991/92	Yanmar Diesel	JSL Division 2	26	2			1	0	27	2
1992	Gamba Osaka	J1 League	-				3	1	3	1
1993	Gamba Osaka	J1 League	23	0	1	0	6	0	30	0
1994	Kashiwa Reysol	Football League	22	0	0	0	1	0	23	0
1995	Kashiwa Reysol	J1 League	5	0	0	0	-		5	0
Total			224	7	1	0	21	2	246	9

== National team statistics ==
Japan national team
Year	Apps	Goals
1988	1	0
1989	8	1
Total	9	1
