= Akinori Nishizawa =

Japanese footballer

Akinori Nishizawa 西澤 明訓
Personal information
- Date of birth: 18 June 1976 (age 50)
- Place of birth: Shizuoka, Shizuoka, Japan
- Height: 1.80 m (5 ft 11 in)
- Position: Forward

Youth career
- 1992–1994: Shimizu Higashi High School

Senior career*
Years	Team	Apps	(Gls)
1995–2000	Cerezo Osaka	124	(43)
1995–1996	→Volendam (loan)	0	(0)
2000–2001	Espanyol	6	(0)
2001	Cerezo Osaka	0	(0)
2001–2002	Bolton Wanderers	0	(0)
2002–2006	Cerezo Osaka	148	(41)
2007–2008	Shimizu S-Pulse	43	(5)
2009	Cerezo Osaka	18	(1)
Total		339	(90)

International career
1997–2002	Japan	29	(10)
Medal record
Men's football
Representing Japan
AFC Asian Cup
Winner	2000 Lebanon
FIFA Confederations Cup
Runner-up	2001 Korea/Japan
- * Club domestic league appearances and goals

Akinori Nishizawa (西澤 明訓, Nishizawa Akinori; born 18 June 1976) is a Japanese former footballer who played as a forward. He played for Japan national team.

== Club career ==
Nishizawa was born in Shizuoka on 18 June 1976. After graduating from Shimizu Higashi High School, he joined Cerezo Osaka in 1995. He moved to Spanish club Espanyol in December 2000. In July 2001, he moved to English club Bolton Wanderers. During his brief spell playing Bolton Wanderers, he is best remembered for scoring a dramatic late equaliser against Walsall in the League Cup. In 2002, he returned to Cerezo Osaka was relegated to J2 League from 2002. The club won the 2nd place in 2002 and was promoted to J1 League. In 2006, the club was relegated to J2 League. He moved to his local club Shimizu S-Pulse in 2007. He returned to Cerezo Osaka in 2009 and he retired end of 2009 season.

== International career ==
On 21 May 1997, Nishizawa debuted for Japan national team against South Korea. Although he played four games and scored two goals at 1998 World Cup qualification in 1997, he was not selected Japan for 1998 World Cup. In 2000, he played for Japan for the first time in three years. At 2000 Asian Cup in October, he played all six games and scored five goals. Japan won the champions. At 2001 Confederations Cup, he also played four games and scored one goal. Japan achieved second place. He was selected Japan for 2002 World Cup and played one game. This match was his last game for Japan. He played 29 games and scored 10 goals for Japan until 2002.

== Career statistics ==
=== Club ===
Appearances and goals by club, season and competition
Club	Season	League			National cup		League cup		Total	
Club	Season	Division	Apps	Goals	Apps	Goals	Apps	Goals	Apps	Goals
Cerezo Osaka	1995	J1 League	0	0	0	0	–		0	0
Cerezo Osaka	1996	J1 League	14	3	2	0	11	5	27	8
Cerezo Osaka	1997	J1 League	19	7	2	1	2	2	23	10
Cerezo Osaka	1998	J1 League	32	7	1	0	4	1	37	8
Cerezo Osaka	1999	J1 League	30	11	2	4	3	2	35	17
Cerezo Osaka	2000	J1 League	29	15	–		3	2	32	17
Cerezo Osaka	Total		124	43	7	5	23	12	154	60
Volendam (loan)	1995–96	Eredivisie	0	0			–		0	0
Espanyol	2000–01	La Liga	6	0	2	0	–		8	0
Cerezo Osaka	2001	J1 League	0	0	0	0	0	0	0	0
Bolton Wanderers	2001–02	Premier League	0	0	0	0	3	1	3	1
Cerezo Osaka	2002	J2 League	34	8	1	0	–		35	8
Cerezo Osaka	2003	J1 League	24	7	5	1	4	1	33	9
Cerezo Osaka	2004	J1 League	29	8	1	0	5	1	35	9
Cerezo Osaka	2005	J1 League	28	10	2	0	8	4	38	14
Cerezo Osaka	2006	J1 League	33	8	1	0	6	4	40	12
Cerezo Osaka	Total		148	41	10	1	23	10	181	52
Shimizu S-Pulse	2007	J1 League	22	0	3	2	6	1	31	3
Shimizu S-Pulse	2008	J1 League	21	5	0	0	8	2	29	7
Shimizu S-Pulse	Total		43	5	3	2	14	3	60	10
Cerezo Osaka	2009	J2 League	18	1	0	0	–		18	1
Career total			339	90	22	8	63	26	424	124

=== International ===
Appearances and goals by national team and year
National team	Year	Apps	Goals
Japan	1997	5	2
Japan	1998	0	0
Japan	1999	0	0
Japan	2000	11	6
Japan	2001	8	1
Japan	2002	5	1
Total		29	10

Scores and results list Japan's goal tally first, score column indicates score after each Nishizawa goal.

List of international goals scored by Akinori Nishizawa
No.	Date	Venue	Opponent	Score	Result	Competition
1	1997					
2	1997					
3	5 June 2000	Casablanca, Morocco	France		2–2	Friendly
4	17 October 2000	Sidon, Lebanon	Uzbekistan		8–1	2000 AFC Asian Cup
5	17 October 2000	Sidon, Lebanon	Uzbekistan		8–1	2000 AFC Asian Cup
6	17 October 2000	Sidon, Lebanon	Uzbekistan		8–1	2000 AFC Asian Cup
7	20 October 2000	Beirut, Lebanon	Qatar		1–1	2000 AFC Asian Cup
8	26 October 2000	Beirut, Lebanon	China		3–2	2000 AFC Asian Cup
9	22 June 2006	Niigata, Japan	Canada		3–0	2001 FIFA Confederations Cup
10	29 April 2002	Tokyo, Japan	Slovakia		1–0	2002 Kirin Cup

== Honours ==
Japan

- FIFA Confederations Cup runner-up: 2001
- AFC Asian Cup: 2000

Individual

- J1 League Best Eleven: 2000
