= Fernandinho (footballer, born January 1981) =

Brazilian footballer

Personal information
- Full name: Éldis Fernando Damasio
- Date of birth: January 13, 1981 (age 45)
- Place of birth: Florianópolis, Brazil
- Height: 1.61 m (5 ft 3 in)
- Position: Attacking midfielder

Senior career*
Years	Team	Apps	(Gls)
2001	Guaratinguetá	-	(-)
2002–2003	Figueirense	20	(9)
2002	→ Tupã (loan)	-	(-)
2004	São Caetano	-	(-)
2004–2006	Gamba Osaka	81	(23)
2007–2008	Shimizu S-Pulse	46	(10)
2008	→ Kyoto Sanga (loan)	16	(3)
2009	Vasco da Gama	6	(0)
2009	→ Oita Trinita (loan)	15	(3)
2010	Vegalta Sendai	26	(8)
2011–2012	Mogi Mirim		
2012	Ventforet Kofu	17	(1)
2013–2014	Clube Atlético Linense		
2014–2016	Gainare Tottori	55	(19)
2017	Ferroviária		
2018–2020	Gainare Tottori	73	(20)
- * Club domestic league appearances and goals

Éldis Fernando Damasio, better known as Fernandinho (フェルナンジーニョ, born January 13, 1981), is a Brazilian former footballer who played as an attacking midfielder.

== Club career statistics ==
Updated to 23 February 2020.

Club performance			League		Cup		League Cup		Continental		Total	
Season	Club	League	Apps	Goals	Apps	Goals	Apps	Goals	Apps	Goals	Apps	Goals
Japan			League		Emperor's Cup		J. League Cup		AFC		Total	
2004	Gamba Osaka	J1 League	28	10	4	1	7	2	-		39	13
2005	Gamba Osaka	J1 League	34	7	2	0	11	3	-		47	10
2006	Gamba Osaka	J1 League	19	6	0	0	2	0	6	5	27	11
2007	Shimizu S-Pulse	J1 League	33	9	2	0	4	0	-		39	9
2008	Shimizu S-Pulse	J1 League	13	1	0	0	3	2	-		16	3
2008	Kyoto Sanga F.C.	J1 League	16	3	1	0	0	0	-		17	3
2009	Oita Trinita	J1 League	15	3	2	0	0	0	-		17	3
2010	Vegalta Sendai	J1 League	26	8	0	0	4	1	-		30	9
2012	Ventforet Kofu	J2 League	17	1	1	0	-		-		18	1
2014	Gainare Tottori	J3 League	15	7	0	0	-		-		15	7
2015	Gainare Tottori	J3 League	14	5	0	0	-		-		14	5
2016	Gainare Tottori	J3 League	26	7	2	1	-		-		28	8
2018	Gainare Tottori	J3 League	31	9	2	0	-		-		33	9
2019	Gainare Tottori	J3 League	25	7	1	0	-		-		26	7
Total			312	83	17	2	31	8	6	5	366	98
