= Gilmar Rinaldi =

Brazilian footballer (born 1959)

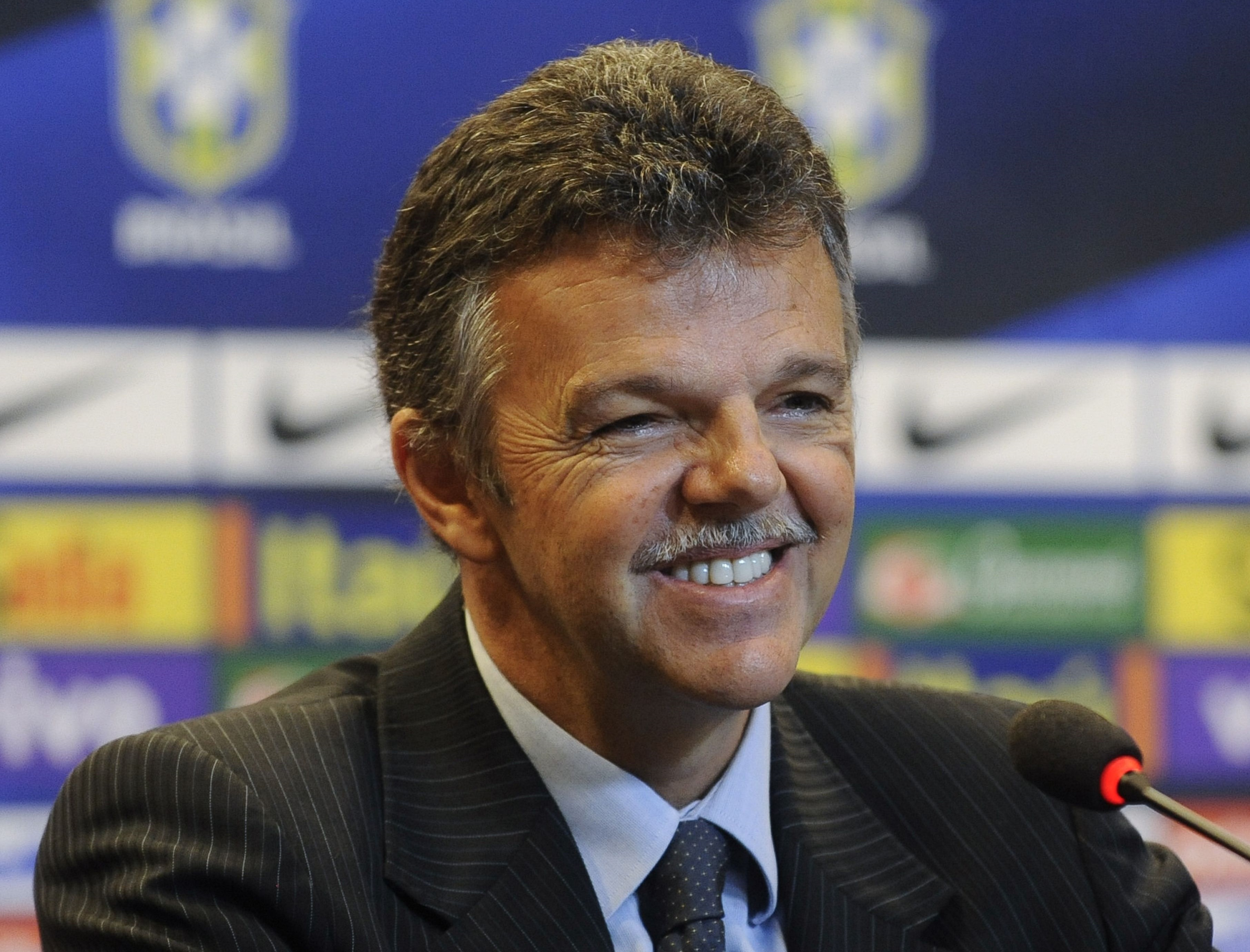

Personal information
- Full name: Gilmar Luís Rinaldi
- Date of birth: 13 January 1959 (age 67)
- Place of birth: Erechim, Brazil
- Height: 1.80 m (5 ft 11 in)
- Position: Goalkeeper

Senior career*
Years	Team	Apps	(Gls)
1978–1985	Internacional	25	(0)
1986–1990	São Paulo	61	(0)
1991–1994	Flamengo	74	(0)
1995–1997	Cerezo Osaka	80	(0)
Total		240	(0)

International career
1986–1995	Brazil	9	(0)
Medal record
Men's Football
Representing Brazil
FIFA World Cup
Winner	1994
Olympic Games
Silver medal – second place	1984 Los Angeles	Team
- * Club domestic league appearances and goals

Gilmar Luís Rinaldi (born 13 January 1959) is a Brazilian former footballer who played as a goalkeeper, and a current football agent of such players as Adriano.

Gilmar competed for Brazil at the 1984 Summer Olympics, and was part of the victorious 1994 FIFA World Cup squad.

After retiring as a player, Gilmar returned to Flamengo in 1999 as Superintendent of Football. He held this position for two consecutive years and then went on to devote himself to the role of sports agent for football players.

After the 2014 World Cup, Gilmar was announced as General Coordinator for the Seleção.

== Career statistics ==
=== Club ===
Club performance			League		Cup		League Cup		Total	
Season	Club	League	Apps	Goals	Apps	Goals	Apps	Goals	Apps	Goals
Brazil			League		Copa do Brasil		League Cup		Total	
1978	Internacional	Série A	0	0					0	0
1979	Internacional	Série A	0	0					0	0
1980	Internacional	Série A	0	0					0	0
1981	Internacional	Série A	0	0					0	0
1982	Internacional	Série A	5	0					5	0
1983	Internacional	Série A	0	0					0	0
1984	Internacional	Série A	0	0					0	0
1985	Internacional	Série A	20	0					20	0
1986	São Paulo	Série A	22	0					22	0
1987	São Paulo	Série A	6	0					6	0
1988	São Paulo	Série A	14	0					14	0
1989	São Paulo	Série A	17	0					17	0
1990	São Paulo	Série A	2	0					2	0
1991	Flamengo	Série A	11	0					11	0
1992	Flamengo	Série A	27	0					27	0
1993	Flamengo	Série A	18	0					18	0
1994	Flamengo	Série A	18	0					18	0
Japan			League		Emperor's Cup		J.League Cup		Total	
1995	Cerezo Osaka	J1 League	38	0	2	0	-		40	0
1996	Cerezo Osaka	J1 League	29	0	2	0	13	0	44	0
1997	Cerezo Osaka	J1 League	13	0	0	0	6	0	19	0
Country	Brazil		160	0					160	0
Country	Japan		80	0	4	0	19	0	103	0
Total			240	0	4	0	19	0	263	0

=== International ===
Brazil national team
Year	Apps	Goals
1986	2	0
1987	2	0
1988	0	0
1989	0	0
1990	0	0
1991	0	0
1992	2	0
1993	1	0
1994	0	0
1995	2	0
Total	9	0

== Honours ==
=== Club ===
Internacional

- Rio Grande do Sul State Championship: 1981, 1982, 1983, 1984

São Paulo

- São Paulo State Championship: 1985, 1987, 1989
- Brazilian National Championship: 1986

Flamengo

- Rio State Championship: 1991
- Brazilian National Championship: 1992

=== International ===
Brazil

- FIFA World Cup: 1994

=== Individual ===
- Brazilian "Silver ball" (Placar): 1986, 1989
