= Shigeki Kurata =

Japanese footballer

Shigeki Kurata 藏田 茂樹
Personal information
- Full name: Shigeki Kurata
- Date of birth: June 22, 1972 (age 54)
- Place of birth: Joyo, Kyoto, Japan
- Height: 1.77 m (5 ft 9 1/2 in)
- Position: Defender

Youth career
- 1988–1990: Yamashiro High School
- 1991–1994: Juntendo University

Senior career*
Years	Team	Apps	(Gls)
1995–2001	Cerezo Osaka	141	(3)
2002–2004	Avispa Fukuoka	86	(1)
Total		227	(4)
Medal record
Cerezo Osaka
Runner-up	Emperor's Cup	2001
- * Club domestic league appearances and goals

Shigeki Kurata (藏田 茂樹, Kurata Shigeki; born June 22, 1972) is a former Japanese football player.

== Playing career ==
Kurata was born in Joyo on June 22, 1972. After graduating from Juntendo University, he joined the newly promoted J1 League club, Cerezo Osaka in 1995. He played in many matches as a center back starting with his first season and became a regular player in 1999. Although he did not play as much in 2001, the club won second place in the 2001 Emperor's Cup. In 2002, he moved to the J2 League club Avispa Fukuoka. He played in many matches as a center back over three seasons and then retired at the end of the 2004 season.

== Club statistics ==
Club performance			League		Cup		League Cup		Total	
Season	Club	League	Apps	Goals	Apps	Goals	Apps	Goals	Apps	Goals
Japan			League		Emperor's Cup		League Cup		Total	
1995	Cerezo Osaka	J1 League	27	1	0	0	-		27	1
1996	Cerezo Osaka	J1 League	19	0	1	0	8	1	28	1
1997	Cerezo Osaka	J1 League	10	0	0	0	4	0	14	0
1998	Cerezo Osaka	J1 League	18	0	1	0	3	0	22	0
1999	Cerezo Osaka	J1 League	24	0	2	0	4	0	30	0
2000	Cerezo Osaka	J1 League	27	1	3	0	4	0	34	1
2001	Cerezo Osaka	J1 League	16	1	4	0	2	0	22	1
2002	Avispa Fukuoka	J2 League	27	1	4	0	-		31	1
2003	Avispa Fukuoka	J2 League	30	0	2	0	-		32	0
2004	Avispa Fukuoka	J2 League	29	0	0	0	-		29	0
Career total			227	4	17	0	25	1	269	5
