= Marquinhos (footballer, born 1966) =

Brazilian footballer

Personal information
- Full name: Marco Antonio da Silva
- Date of birth: May 9, 1966 (age 60)
- Place of birth: Belo Horizonte, Brazil
- Height: 1.71 m (5 ft 7 1/2 in)
- Position: Midfielder

Senior career*
Years	Team	Apps	(Gls)
1986–1991	Atlético Mineiro		
1992–1993	Internacional		
1994–1996	Cerezo Osaka	84	(40)
1997–1998	América		

International career
1990	Brazil	1	(0)
- * Club domestic league appearances and goals

Marco Antonio da Silva (born May 9, 1966), also known as Marquinhos, is a former Brazilian football player.

== Career statistics ==
Appearances and goals by club, season and competition
Club	Season	League			Emperor's Cup		J.League Cup		Total	
Club	Season	Division	Apps	Goals	Apps	Goals	Apps	Goals	Apps	Goals
Cerezo Osaka	1994	Football League	29	21	5	2	1	0	35	23
Cerezo Osaka	1995	J1 League	39	16	1	0	—		40	16
Cerezo Osaka	1996	J1 League	16	3	0	0	8	1	24	4
Career total			84	40	6	2	9	1	99	43

== National team statistics ==
Brazil national team
Year	Apps	Goals
1990	1	0
Total	1	0
