= Tatsuya Kojima =

Japanese baseball player

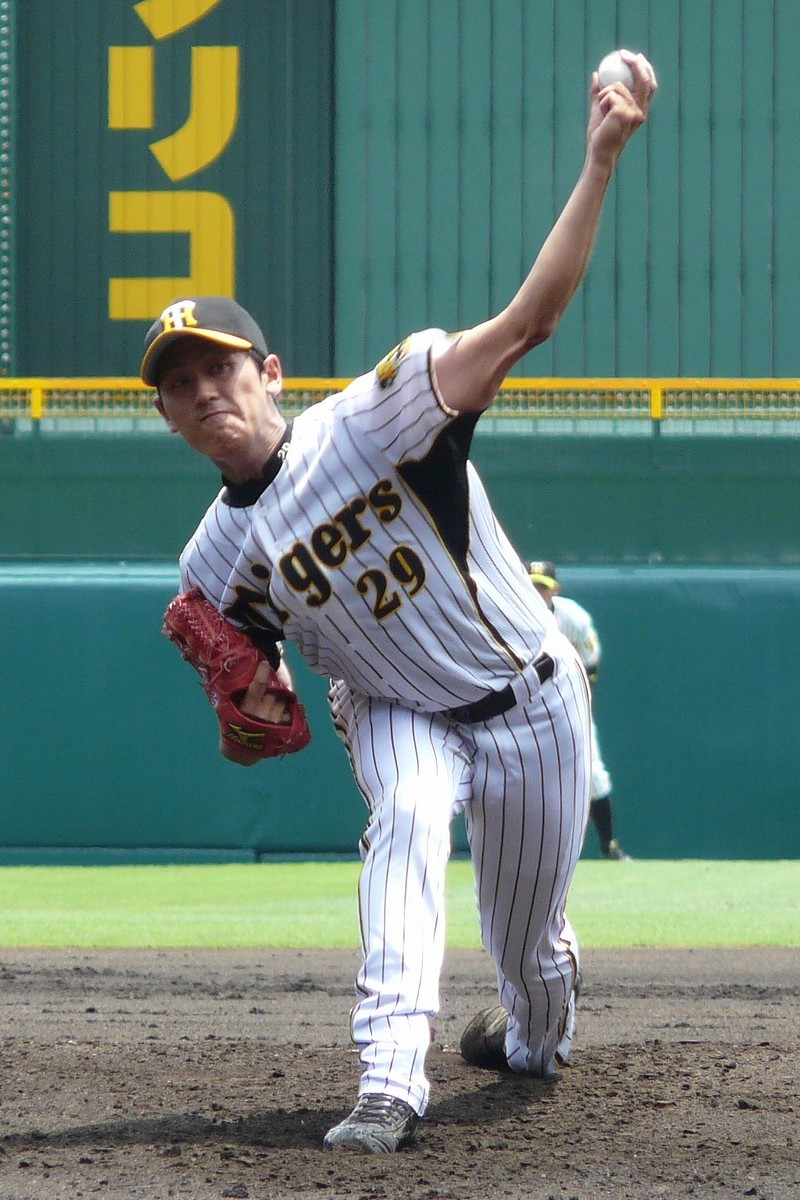
- Kojima with the Hanshin Tigers
- Pitcher
- Born: October 7, 1985 (age 40)
- Bats: Right Throws: Right

NPB debut
- 2007, for the Hanshin Tigers

NPB statistics (through 2015)
- Win–loss record: 4–9
- ERA: 5.32
- Strikeouts: 117

Teams
- Hanshin Tigers (2007, 2009–2015)

Tatsuya Kojima (小嶋 達也, Kojima Tatsuya; born October 7, 1985 in Suita, Osaka) is a Japanese former professional baseball pitcher in Japan's Nippon Professional Baseball. He played for the Hanshin Tigers in 2007 and from 2009 to 2015.
