= Shinji Yamasaki =

Japanese water polo player

Personal information
- Born: November 13, 1962 (age 62)

Sport
- Sport: Water polo

Shinji Yamasaki (山崎 慎次, Yamasaki Shinji, born 13 November 1962) is a Japanese former water polo player who competed in the 1984 Summer Olympics.
