= 1994 Japan Football League =

Japan Football League
- Season: 1994
- Champions: Cerezo Osaka
- Promoted: Cerezo Osaka; Kashiwa Reysol
- Relegated: no relegation

Statistics of Japan Football League in the 1994 season.

== Overview ==
It was contested by 16 teams, and Cerezo Osaka won the championship. Along with Kashiwa Reysol, they were promoted to the J.League.

NEC Yamagata, the future Montedio Yamagata, were promoted to the JFL before the season, having won the Regional Promotion Series.

== Clubs ==
The following sixteen clubs participated in Japan Football League during the 1994 season.

- Cerezo Osaka
- Cosmo Oil
- Fujieda Flux
- Fujitsu
- Honda
- Kashiwa Reysol
- Kawasaki Steel
- Kofu Club
- Kyoto Purple Sanga
- NEC Yamagata
- NTT Kanto
- Otsuka Pharmaceutical
- PJM Futures
- Seino Transportation
- Tokyo Gas
- Toshiba

=== Personnel ===
Club	Head coach
Cerezo Osaka	(Brazil) Paulo Emilio
Cosmo Oil	
Fujieda Flux	(Japan) Yoshio Kikugawa
Fujitsu	
Honda	
Kashiwa Reysol	(Brazil) Zé Sérgio
Kawasaki Steel	
Kofu Club	(Japan) Susumu Katsumata
Kyoto Purple Sanga	(Japan) George Yonashiro
NEC Yamagata	(Japan) Naoki Sugisawa
NTT Kanto	
Otsuka Pharmaceutical	(Japan) Hajime Ishii
PJM Futures	(Federal Republic of Yugoslavia) Ivan Čabrinović
Seino Transportation	
Tokyo Gas	(Japan) Toshiaki Imai
Toshiba	(Japan) Takeo Takahashi

=== Foreign players ===
Club	Player 1	Player 2	Player 3	Player 4	Player 5	Non-visa foreign	Former players
Cerezo Osaka	(Brazil) Carlos Moura	(Brazil) Marquinhos	(Brazil) Toninho Cecílio				
Cosmo Oil	(South Korea) Kim Byung-soo						
Fujieda Flux	(Argentina) Carlos Mayor	(Argentina) Darío Siviski	(Argentina) Nestor Omar Piccoli	(Argentina) Pedro Troglio	(South Korea) Cho Min-kook		
Fujitsu	(China) Gao Sheng						
Honda							
Kashiwa Reysol	(Brazil) Aílton Ferraz	(Brazil) Careca	(Brazil) Nelsinho	(Brazil) Wagner Lopes			
Kawasaki Steel							
Kofu Club							
Kyoto Purple Sanga	(Brazil) Angelo	(Brazil) Everton	(Brazil) Walter	(Uruguay) Mario López	(Uruguay) Santiago Ostolaza	(Brazil) Jair Masaoka	
NEC Yamagata							(Brazil) Beto
NTT Kanto							
Otsuka Pharmaceutical	(Brazil) Wagner						
PJM Futures	(Argentina) Héctor Enrique	(Argentina) Hugo Maradona	(Argentina) Pedro Pasculli	(Argentina) Sergio Batista	(Uruguay) Johnny Miqueiro		
Seino Transportation							
Tokyo Gas	(Brazil) Amaral						
Toshiba	(Panama) Jorge Dely Valdés	(Uruguay) Pedro Pedrucci					

== League standings ==
Pos	Team	Pld	W	L	GF	GA	GD	Promotion
1	Cerezo Osaka	30	26	4	85	33	+52	Promoted to J.League
2	Kashiwa Reysol	30	25	5	82	29	+53	Promoted to J.League
3	Fujieda Blux	30	24	6	61	32	+29	
4	PJM Futures	30	22	8	70	47	+23	
5	Kyoto Purple Sanga	30	20	10	63	47	+16	
6	Otsuka Pharmaceutical	30	18	12	63	46	+17	
7	Tokyo Gas	30	18	12	55	43	+12	
8	Kawasaki Steel	30	13	17	36	46	−10	
9	Honda	30	12	18	49	62	−13	
10	Fujitsu	30	11	19	39	52	−13	
11	Toshiba	30	11	19	56	71	−15	
12	NTT Kanto	30	10	20	37	46	−9	
13	NEC Yamagata	30	10	20	30	57	−27	
14	Kofu Club	30	9	21	36	74	−38	
15	Cosmo Oil	30	7	23	33	67	−34	
16	Seino Transportation	30	4	26	29	72	−43	

Source: RSSSF
