= Yanmar Hanasaka Stadium =

Sports venue in Osaka, Japan

Yanmar Hanasaka Stadium ヤンマーハナサカスタジアム
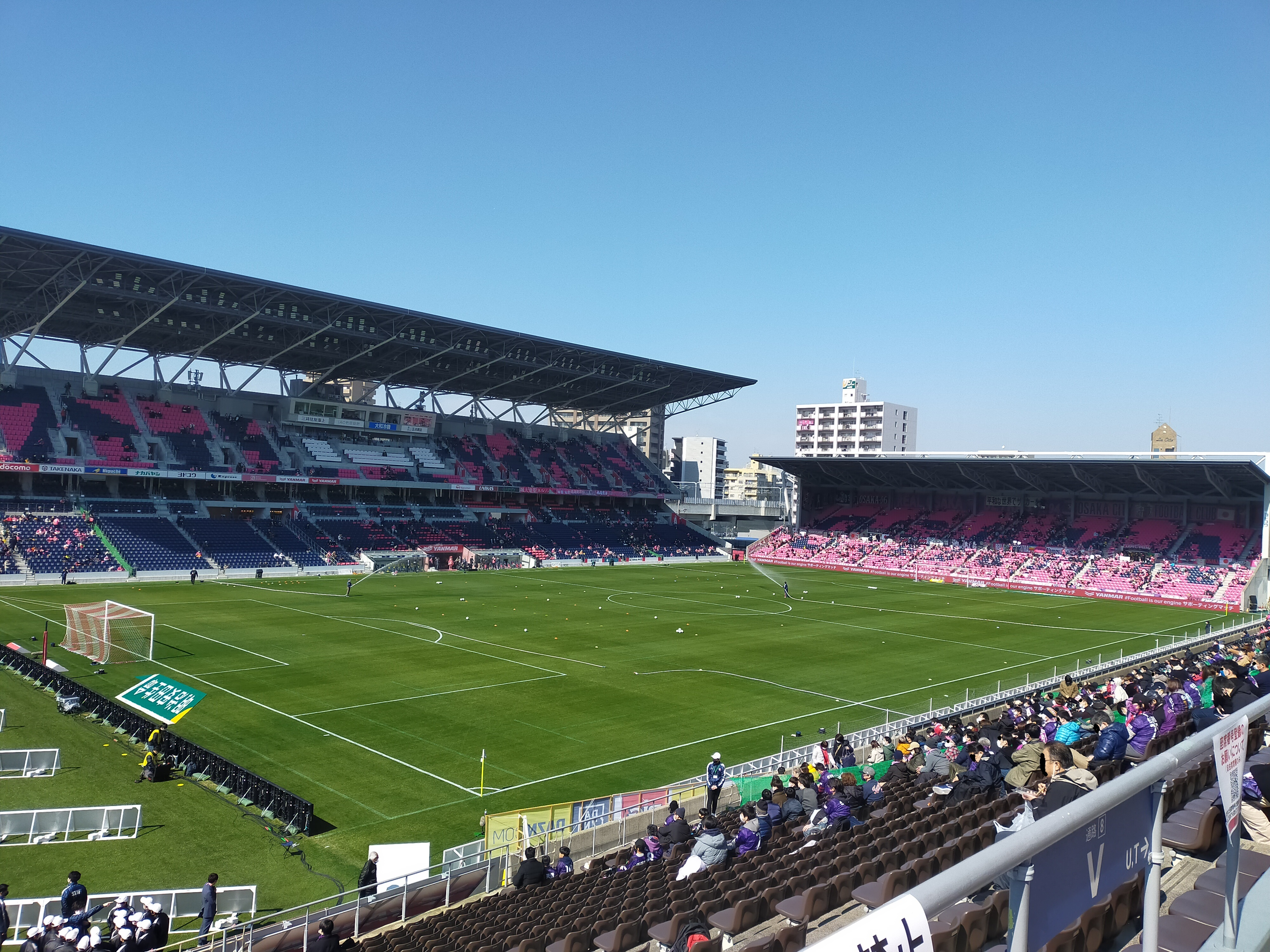
- Interactive map of Yanmar Hanasaka Stadium ヤンマーハナサカスタジアム
- Full name: Yanmar Hanasaka Stadium
- Former names: Kincho Stadium (2010–2018); Yodoko Sakura Stadium (2020-2025)
- Location: Higashisumiyoshi-ku Osaka, Japan
- Coordinates: 34°36′55″N 135°31′00″E
- Owner: Osaka City
- Operator: Osaka City Sports and Greenery Association
- Capacity: 24,481
- Surface: Grass
- Scoreboard: Yes
- Field size: 105 x 68 m
- Public transit: JR West: R Hanwa Line at Nagai; Osaka Metro: Midosuji Line at Nagai

Construction
- Opened: April 1987
- Renovated: 2010, 2021

Tenants
- Cerezo Osaka (2010–2018, 2021–present); NTT DoCoMo Red Hurricanes Osaka (2022–present)

Yanmar Hanasaka Stadium (ヤンマーハナサカスタジアム), a.k.a. “Nagai Ballgame Field” (長居球技場), is a stadium located in Nagai Park, Higashisumiyoshi-ku, Osaka, Japan. It plays host to J.League association football, international rugby, Japan Rugby League One, and X-League American football games. The 24,481-seat stadium is the third stadium in the Nagai Complex, along with Nagai Stadium and Nagai Aid Stadium.

After the first renovation of the stadium in 2010, its naming rights was handed over to the Dainihon Jochugiku Company (大日本除虫菊株式会社; Kincho) for 36 million yen a year for eight years. Thus, the stadium became the "Kincho Stadium (キンチョウスタジアム)". Kincho also became the shirt sponsor for Cerezo Osaka.

In 2021, after another renovation, the stadium was renamed to "Yodoko Sakura Stadium (ヨドコウ桜スタジアム)" after the Yodogawa Steel Works (株式会社淀川製鋼所), which signed a comprehensive partnership agreement with Cerezo Osaka.

== See also ==
- Nagai Park
  - Nagai Stadium
  - Nagai Aid Stadium
