= 1996 Cerezo Osaka season =

Cerezo Osaka
1996 season
- Manager: Paulo Emilio; Hiroshi Sowa (from 31 May 1996)
- Stadium: Osaka Nagai No.2 Stadium; Osaka Nagai Stadium
- J.League: 13th
- Emperor's Cup: 4th Round
- J.League Cup: GL-B 6th
- Top goalscorer: League: Hiroaki Morishima (9); All: Hiroaki Morishima (13)
- Highest home attendance: 13,069 (vs Verdy Kawasaki, 28 August 1996, Osaka Nagai Stadium)
- Lowest home attendance: 6,276 (vs Sanfrecce Hiroshima, 23 March 1996, Osaka Nagai No.2 Stadium); 5,896 (vs JEF United Ichihara, 11 May 1996, Kobe Universiade Memorial Stadium)
- Average home league attendance: 8,229
Home colours	Away colours

1996 Cerezo Osaka season

== Review and events ==
=== League results summary ===
Overall								Home						Away					
Pld	W	D	L	GF	GA	GD	Pts	W	D	L	GF	GA	GD	W	D	L	GF	GA	GD
30	10	0	20	38	56	−18	30	6	0	9	28	31	−3	4	0	11	10	25	−15

Source: J.LEAGUE OFFICIAL GUIDE 1997. ISBN 4-09-102329-0.

=== League results by round ===
Round	1	2	3	4	5	6	7	8	9	10	11	12	13	14	15	16	17	18	19	20	21	22	23	24	25	26	27	28	29	30
Ground	H	A	H	A	H	A	H	A	H	H	A	A	H	A	H	H	A	H	A	A	H	A	H	A	H	A	H	A	H	A
Result	L	L	L	W	L	L	L	L	W	W	W	W	L	L	L	L	L	L	L	L	L	L	W	L	W	W	W	L	W	L
Position	15	13	13	12	12	14	14	15	15	15	14	13	13	14	14	15	15	15	15	15	15	15	15	15	15	15	14	14	12	13

Source: J.LEAGUE OFFICIAL GUIDE 1997. ISBN 4-09-102329-0.
A = Away; H = Home; W = Win; D = Draw; L = Loss

== Competitions ==
Competitions	Position
J.League	13th / 16 clubs
Emperor's Cup	4th round
J.League Cup	GL-B 6th / 8 clubs

== Domestic results ==
=== J.League ===
16 March 1996 1	Cerezo Osaka	0–2	Yokohama Flügels	Osaka Nagai No.2 Stadium
15:03 JST (UTC+09)		J.League	Evair 44'; Moriyama 73'	Attendance: 8,087; Referee: Yoshitsugu Katayama; Assistant referees: Kazuya Yanagisawa, Satoru Kawano; Fourth official: Tsuyoshi Miyake

20 March 1996 2	Shimizu S-Pulse	2–1	Cerezo Osaka	Nihondaira Sports Stadium
15:00 JST (UTC+09)	Hasegawa 85'; Sawanobori 88'	J.League	Marquinhos 73'	Attendance: 16,413; Referee: Tetsuya Hamana; Assistant referees: Sōichirō Kaneko, Hitoshi Nakagomi; Fourth official: Naoki Uchiyama

23 March 1996 3	Cerezo Osaka	1–2 (V-goal) (a.e.t.)	Sanfrecce Hiroshima	Osaka Nagai No.2 Stadium
15:01 JST (UTC+09)	Morishima 13'	J.League	Yoshida 26'; Takagi 96'	Attendance: 6,276; Referee: Zoran Petrović; Assistant referees: Akio Okutani, Hiroyuki Ōnishi; Fourth official: Tsuyoshi Miyake

30 March 1996 4	Kyoto Purple Sanga	0–2	Cerezo Osaka	Kyoto Nishikyogoku Stadium
15:03 JST (UTC+09)		J.League	24' (o.g.); Morishima 78'	Attendance: 5,231; Referee: Yasuhiro Hemmi; Assistant referees: Kazuya Yanagisawa, Hiroyuki Ōnishi; Fourth official: Yōzō Tanaka

3 April 1996 5	Cerezo Osaka	2–3 (V-goal) (a.e.t.)	Bellmare Hiratsuka	Osaka Nagai No.2 Stadium
19:01 JST (UTC+09)	Morishima 66', 73'	J.League	Noguchi 29'; Harasaki 39'; 114' (o.g.)	Attendance: 6,389; Referee: Keiichi Sunakawa; Assistant referees: Tōru Yamashiro, Hiroyuki Izumi; Fourth official: Kazuo Kakihana

6 April 1996 6	Kashiwa Reysol	3–0	Cerezo Osaka	Hitachi Kashiwa Soccer Stadium
15:03 JST (UTC+09)	Sugano 19', 89'; N. Katō 49'	J.League		Attendance: 8,790; Referee: Hiroshi Tanabe; Assistant referees: Satoru Ishizawa, Keiji Kamiara; Fourth official: Morio Okamoto

13 April 1996 7	Cerezo Osaka	1–2	Avispa Fukuoka	Osaka Nagai No.2 Stadium
15:05 JST (UTC+09)	Yonekura 81'	J.League	Troglio 0', 77'	Attendance: 7,096; Referee: Archundia; Assistant referees: Sōichirō Kaneko, Akio Okutani; Fourth official: Tsuyoshi Miyake

17 April 1996 8	Yokohama Marinos	3–0	Cerezo Osaka	Yokohama Mitsuzawa Football Stadium
19:03 JST (UTC+09)	Bisconti 8'; Gorosito 34'; Mikuriya 44'	J.League		Attendance: 10,057; Referee: Zoran Petrović; Assistant referees: Kimio Izaki, Hitoshi Nakagomi; Fourth official: Takeshi Ōgiya

20 April 1996 9	Cerezo Osaka	2–1	Júbilo Iwata	Ehime Matsuyama Athletic Stadium
16:02 JST (UTC+09)	Narcizio 32', 37'	J.League	Takeda 23'	Attendance: 6,323; Referee: Masayoshi Okada; Assistant referees: Satoru Kawano, Kazuhiko Matsumura; Fourth official: Hiroshi Yoshinouchi

27 April 1996 10	Cerezo Osaka	3–2 (V-goal) (a.e.t.)	Nagoya Grampus Eight	Osaka Nagai No.2 Stadium
14:03 JST (UTC+09)	Kanda 13' 119'; Morishima 19'	J.League	Durix 47'; Moriyama 85'	Attendance: 11,046; Referee: Kiyoshi Ōta; Assistant referees: Kazuaki Hamaguchi, Akio Okutani; Fourth official: Tamotsu Ōnishi

1 May 1996 11	Urawa Red Diamonds	0–0 (V-goal) (a.e.t.) (4–5 p)	Cerezo Osaka	Urawa Komaba Stadium
19:05 JST (UTC+09)		J.League		Attendance: 17,789; Referee: Hideo Kikuchi; Assistant referees: Yū Nakamura, Kō Ōishi; Fourth official: Shigeru Kimura
	Penalties
	(penalty scored) Hirose; (penalty scored) Taguchi; (penalty missed) Yamada; (penalty scored) N. Ikeda; (penalty scored) Okano; (penalty missed) Fukunaga		(penalty scored) Manoel; (penalty scored) Minamoto; (penalty scored) Kanda; (penalty missed) Morishima; (penalty scored) Fukagawa; (penalty scored) Kurata

4 May 1996 12	Verdy Kawasaki	1–2 (V-goal) (a.e.t.)	Cerezo Osaka	Kawasaki Todoroki Stadium
15:00 JST (UTC+09)	Kurihara 89'	J.League	Marquinhos 82' 109'	Attendance: 15,298; Referee: Hiroshi Tanabe; Assistant referees: Kenichi Koshiyama, Masaaki Shimomura; Fourth official: Kazuo Shirato

11 May 1996 13	Cerezo Osaka	2–3	JEF United Ichihara	Kobe Universiade Memorial Stadium
14:00 JST (UTC+09)	Manoel 31', 59'	J.League	Jō 30'; Akiba 40'; Hašek 83'	Attendance: 5,896; Referee: Piotr Werner; Assistant referees: Akio Okutani, Hiroyuki Ōnishi; Fourth official: Kazuya Yanagisawa

15 May 1996 14	Kashima Antlers	1–0 (V-goal) (a.e.t.)	Cerezo Osaka	Kashima Soccer Stadium
19:04 JST (UTC+09)	Hasegawa 93'	J.League		Attendance: 15,213; Referee: Archundia; Assistant referees: Kazuaki Hamaguchi, Akihisa Makino; Fourth official: Masakatsu Isozaki

18 May 1996 15	Cerezo Osaka	0–2	Gamba Osaka	Osaka Nagai No.2 Stadium
15:00 JST (UTC+09)		J.League	Gillhaus 52'; Kiba 89'	Attendance: 9,325; Referee: Kazuo Kakihana; Assistant referees: Takashi Kunori, Naoki Esumi; Fourth official: Tsuyoshi Miyake

28 August 1996 16	Cerezo Osaka	2–4	Verdy Kawasaki	Osaka Nagai Stadium
19:01 JST (UTC+09)	Morishima 54', 77'	J.League	Magrão 39', 89'; Y. Miura 50'; Bismarck 89'	Attendance: 13,069; Referee: Kazuo Kakihana; Assistant referees: Kazuya Yanagisawa, Kazuhiko Matsumura; Fourth official: Tamotsu Ōnishi

31 August 1996 17	JEF United Ichihara	1–0 (V-goal) (a.e.t.)	Cerezo Osaka	Ichihara Stadium
19:03 JST (UTC+09)	Nakanishi 94'	J.League		Attendance: 7,469; Referee: Masayoshi Okada; Assistant referees: Toshiyuki Mayuzumi, Masahiro Katagiri; Fourth official: Terunobu Kakinuma

7 September 1996 18	Cerezo Osaka	2–4	Kashima Antlers	Kobe Universiade Memorial Stadium
16:04 JST (UTC+09)	Kizawa 12'; Fukagawa 79'	J.League	Yanagisawa 35', 65'; Rodrigo 73', 82'	Attendance: 6,467; Referee: Kenji Tanaka; Assistant referees: Toshimitsu Yoshida, Takuji Fukazawa; Fourth official: Keiji Hayashi

14 September 1996 19	Gamba Osaka	2–0	Cerezo Osaka	Expo '70 Commemorative Stadium
16:04 JST (UTC+09)	Matsuyama 53'; Matsunami 58'	J.League		Attendance: 7,210; Referee: Zoran Petrović; Assistant referees: Yoshikazu Hiroshima, Kōji Minami; Fourth official: Sōichirō Kaneko

21 September 1996 20	Yokohama Flügels	2–1	Cerezo Osaka	Toyama Stadium
16:04 JST (UTC+09)	Evair 28'; Yamaguchi 84'	J.League	Narcizio 44'	Attendance: 10,644; Referee: Lim Kee Chong; Assistant referees: Tetsu Karakida, Kōji Taniuchi; Fourth official: Kinji Sakō

28 September 1996 21	Cerezo Osaka	2–3	Shimizu S-Pulse	Osaka Nagai Stadium
15:00 JST (UTC+09)	Nishizawa 19'; Narcizio 57'	J.League	Santos 51'; Hasegawa 52', 75'	Attendance: 8,043; Referee: Shinichirō Obata; Assistant referees: Kimio Izaki, Hiroyuki Ōnishi; Fourth official: Tamotsu Ōnishi

2 October 1996 22	Sanfrecce Hiroshima	2–1 (V-goal) (a.e.t.)	Cerezo Osaka	Hiroshima Stadium
19:00 JST (UTC+09)	Kubo 78' 90'	J.League	72' (o.g.)	Attendance: 5,387; Referee: Hiroshi Tanabe; Assistant referees: Naoki Esumi, Kazuhiko Matsumura; Fourth official: Kōji Ueno

5 October 1996 23	Cerezo Osaka	2–1	Kyoto Purple Sanga	Osaka Nagai Stadium
14:02 JST (UTC+09)	Manoel 61'; Nishizawa 65'	J.League	Ta. Yamaguchi 11'	Attendance: 8,236; Referee: Bemard Saules; Assistant referees: Satoru Kawano, Takuji Fukazawa; Fourth official: Tsuyoshi Miyake

16 October 1996 24	Bellmare Hiratsuka	3–1	Cerezo Osaka	Hiratsuka Stadium
19:03 JST (UTC+09)	Noguchi 35', 54'; Seki 72'	J.League	Nishizawa 49'	Attendance: 5,365; Referee: Kazuo Kakihana; Assistant referees: Toshiyuki Mayuzumi, Takayoshi Kashino; Fourth official: Ryū Tetsusashi

19 October 1996 25	Cerezo Osaka	5–1	Kashiwa Reysol	Osaka Nagai Stadium
15:03 JST (UTC+09)	Yonekura 36'; Koga 41'; Yokoyama 58', 64'; Narcizio 72'	J.League	N. Katō 71'	Attendance: 11,118; Referee: Leslie Mottram; Assistant referees: Akio Okutani, Takashi Aoki; Fourth official: Tsuyoshi Miyake

26 October 1996 26	Avispa Fukuoka	0–1	Cerezo Osaka	Hakatanomori Football Stadium
15:00 JST (UTC+09)		J.League	Yokoyama 84'	Attendance: 5,351; Referee: Tatsumi Ōno; Assistant referees: Morihisa Yamaguchi, Akihisa Makino; Fourth official: Daikichi Kanada

30 October 1996 27	Cerezo Osaka	1–0	Yokohama Marinos	Osaka Nagai Stadium
19:03 JST (UTC+09)	Yokoyama 84'	J.League		Attendance: 8,573; Referee: Fumikazu Shioyazono; Assistant referees: Naoki Esumi, Naoyuki Mori; Fourth official: Tamotsu Ōnishi

2 November 1996 28	Júbilo Iwata	3–0	Cerezo Osaka	Júbilo Iwata Stadium
14:00 JST (UTC+09)	44' (o.g.); Schillaci 65'; Fujita 75'	J.League		Attendance: 12,019; Referee: Tōru Kamikawa; Assistant referees: Mitsuru Satō, Hitoshi Nakagomi; Fourth official: Tōru Nagata

6 November 1996 29	Cerezo Osaka	3–1	Urawa Red Diamonds	Osaka Nagai Stadium
19:04 JST (UTC+09)	Morishima 30', 71'; Manoel 49'	J.League	Okano 1'	Attendance: 7,493; Referee: Kenji Tanaka; Assistant referees: Kazuya Yanagisawa, Kōji Taniuchi; Fourth official: Tamotsu Ōnishi

9 November 1996 30	Nagoya Grampus Eight	2–1	Cerezo Osaka	Nagoya Mizuho Athletics Stadium
14:30 JST (UTC+09)	Okayama 25'; Ogura 45'	J.League	Manoel 12'	Attendance: 21,358; Referee: Masayoshi Okada; Assistant referees: Kimio Izaki, Sōichirō Kaneko; Fourth official: Takao Shimizu

=== Emperor's Cup ===
1st Round	bye

2nd Round	bye

16 November 1996 3rd Round	Cerezo Osaka	3–1	Tokyo Gas	Osaka Nagai No.2 Stadium
: JST (UTC+09)	Yonekura 1'; Manoel 66'; Fukagawa 82'		Amaral 36'	Attendance: 1,470

23 December 1996 4th Round	Urawa Red Diamonds	4–0	Cerezo Osaka	Tochigi Utsunomiya Green Stadium
13:00 JST (UTC+09)	Bein 39'; Taguchi 41'; Fukunaga 47'; Hori 62'			Attendance: 10,143; Referee: Fumikazu Shioyazono

=== J.League Cup ===
1 June 1996 GL-B-1-1	Cerezo Osaka	0–1	Verdy Kawasaki	Osaka Nagai No.2 Stadium
19:00 JST (UTC+09)		J.League	Bismarck 30'	Attendance: 13,389; Referee: Yoshitsugu Katayama; Assistant referees: Sōichirō Kaneko, Takuji Fukazawa; Fourth official: Tsuyoshi Miyake

5 June 1996 GL-B-1-2	Verdy Kawasaki	3–0 (4–0 agg.)	Cerezo Osaka	Kawasaki Todoroki Stadium
18:59 JST (UTC+09)	Gen 24', 70'; Nunobe 42'	J.League		Attendance: 7,502; Referee: Tōru Kamikawa; Assistant referees: Toshimitsu Yoshida, Akihisa Makino; Fourth official: Mineo Takada

8 June 1996 GL-B-2-1	Cerezo Osaka	3–3	JEF United Ichihara	Sapporo Atsubetsu Stadium
13:02 JST (UTC+09)	Kawamae 7'; Kurata 75'; Kanda 83'	J.League	55' (o.g.), 71' (o.g.); Maslovar 69'	Attendance: 2,218; Referee: Hiroshi Tanabe; Assistant referees: Kenichi Koshiyama, Satoru Ishizawa; Fourth official: Eiji Kaneda

12 June 1996 GL-B-2-2	JEF United Ichihara	2–0 (5–3 agg.)	Cerezo Osaka	Ichihara Stadium
19:02 JST (UTC+09)	Hašek 11'; Jō 79'	J.League		Attendance: 6,042; Referee: Hideo Kikuchi; Assistant referees: Takayoshi Kashino, Takao Onshi; Fourth official: Terunobu Kakinuma

15 June 1996 GL-B-3-1	Cerezo Osaka	0–2	Kashima Antlers	Osaka Nagai No.2 Stadium
19:00 JST (UTC+09)		J.League	Leonardo 4'; Kurosaki 43'	Attendance: 9,978; Referee: Hiroyuki Umemoto; Assistant referees: Sōichirō Kaneko, Hiroyuki Izumi; Fourth official: Tsuyoshi Miyake

19 June 1996 GL-B-3-2	Kashima Antlers	0–3 (2–3 agg.)	Cerezo Osaka	Kashima Soccer Stadium
19:00 JST (UTC+09)		J.League	Manoel 6'; Nishizawa 19'; Yokoyama 89'	Attendance: 15,292; Referee: Piotr Werner; Assistant referees: Kenichi Koshiyama, Kimio Izaki; Fourth official: Kazuhiko Kumagai

22 June 1996 GL-B-4-1	Shimizu S-Pulse	2–1	Cerezo Osaka	Nihondaira Sports Stadium
16:03 JST (UTC+09)	Nagai 50', 69'	J.League	Narcizio 61'	Attendance: 15,401; Referee: Kiyoshi Ōta; Assistant referees: Masahiro Katagiri, Yasushi Tsuchimoto; Fourth official: Naoki Uchiyama

26 June 1996 GL-B-4-2	Cerezo Osaka	0–1 (1–3 agg.)	Shimizu S-Pulse	Osaka Nagai No.2 Stadium
19:01 JST (UTC+09)		J.League	Sawanobori 76'	Attendance: 5,677; Referee: Archundia; Assistant referees: Morihisa Yamaguchi, Takashi Aoki; Fourth official: Tamotsu Ōnishi

29 June 1996 GL-B-5-1	Avispa Fukuoka	2–2	Cerezo Osaka	Hakatanomori Football Stadium
18:30 JST (UTC+09)	48' (o.g.); Takemoto 66'	J.League	Nishizawa 44'; Yonekura 89'	Attendance: 6,354; Referee: Kazuo Kakihana; Assistant referees: Tōru Yamashiro, Satoru Kawano; Fourth official: Daikichi Kanada

3 July 1996 GL-B-5-2	Cerezo Osaka	8–1 (10–3 agg.)	Avispa Fukuoka	Osaka Nagai No.2 Stadium
19:00 JST (UTC+09)	Nishizawa 1', 11'; Yonekura 27'; Narcizio 36'; Kanda 43'; Marquinhos 52'; Morishima 70', 77'	J.League	Fujimoto 84'	Attendance: 5,771; Referee: Yoshitsugu Katayama; Assistant referees: Kazuya Yanagisawa, Kazuhisa Osada; Fourth official: Tamotsu Ōnishi

10 August 1996 GL-B-6-1	Yokohama Flügels	1–1	Cerezo Osaka	Kagoshima Kamoike Stadium
18:32 JST (UTC+09)	Maezono 44'	J.League	Morishima 37'	Attendance: 6,055; Referee: Yasuhiro Hemmi; Assistant referees: Satoru Kawano, Hiroyuki Izumi; Fourth official: Masayuki Kanda

14 August 1996 GL-B-6-2	Cerezo Osaka	1–1 (2–2 agg.)	Yokohama Flügels	Osaka Nagai Stadium
19:03 JST (UTC+09)	Tsukamoto 64'	J.League	Maezono 15'	Attendance: 23,052; Referee: Yasuhiro Matsuzaki; Assistant referees: Hiroshi Fukuda, Tamotsu Ōnishi; Fourth official: 田付 秀次

17 August 1996 GL-B-7-1	Nagoya Grampus Eight	6–1	Cerezo Osaka	Gifu Nagaragawa Stadium
19:03 JST (UTC+09)	Stojković 10', 84'; Hirano 19'; Ogura 34', 43'; Moriyama 88'	J.League	Yonekura 48'	Attendance: 19,268; Referee: Keiichi Sunakawa; Assistant referees: Ichirō Inukai, Keiji Kamiara; Fourth official: Tatsuo Gotō

21 August 1996 GL-B-7-2	Cerezo Osaka	3–1 (4–7 agg.)	Nagoya Grampus Eight	Osaka Nagai Stadium
19:00 JST (UTC+09)	Nishizawa 35'; Morishima 77'; Manoel 84'	J.League	Asano 66'	Attendance: 7,129; Referee: Shinichirō Obata; Assistant referees: Kōji Taniuchi, Masaaki Shimomura; Fourth official: Tamotsu Ōnishi

== Player statistics ==
Pos.	Nat.	Player	D.o.B. (Age)	Height / Weight	J.League		Emperor's Cup		J.League Cup		Total	
Pos.	Nat.	Player	D.o.B. (Age)	Height / Weight	Apps	Goals	Apps	Goals	Apps	Goals	Apps	Goals
GK	(Brazil)	Gilmar	January 13, 1959 (aged 37)	184 cm / 78 kg	29	0	2	0	13	0	44	0
GK	(Japan)	Nobuhiro Takeda	March 22, 1965 (aged 30)	180 cm / 75 kg	0	0		0	0	0		0
MF	(Japan)	Satoshi Kajino	November 9, 1965 (aged 30)	177 cm / 71 kg	14	0	1	0	9	0	24	0
MF	(Brazil)	Marquinhos	May 9, 1966 (aged 29)	172 cm / 72 kg	16	3	0	0	8	1	24	4
DF	(Japan)	Katsuo Kanda	June 21, 1966 (aged 29)	182 cm / 74 kg	23	2	2	0	13	2	38	4
DF	(Japan)	Kazuhiro Murata	May 12, 1969 (aged 26)	182 cm / 75 kg	23	0	2	0	8	0	33	0
DF	(Japan)	Masanori Kizawa	June 2, 1969 (aged 26)	170 cm / 62 kg	28	1	2	0	9	0	39	1
DF	(Japan)	Akimasa Tsukamoto	November 22, 1969 (aged 26)	170 cm / 69 kg	6	0	0	0	3	1	9	1
DF	(Japan)	Hiroyuki Inagaki	April 24, 1970 (aged 25)	176 cm / 70 kg	7	0	0	0	6	0	13	0
MF	(Japan)	Mitsuhiro Misaki	May 6, 1970 (aged 25)	170 cm / 62 kg	4	0	0	0	5	0	9	0
MF	(Japan)	Makoto Yonekura	December 28, 1970 (aged 25)	176 cm / 69 kg	22	2	2	1	14	3	38	6
MF	(Japan)	Yasushi Mizusaki	June 13, 1971 (aged 24)	167 cm / 60 kg	0	0		0	0	0		0
FW	(Brazil)	Narcizio	July 18, 1971 (aged 24)	178 cm / 76 kg	12	5	0	0	8	2	20	7
DF	(Japan)	Rikiya Kawamae	August 20, 1971 (aged 24)	180 cm / 68 kg	13	0	2	0	10	1	25	1
DF	(Japan)	Masato Ōtake	August 31, 1971 (aged 24)	178 cm / 73 kg	0	0		0	0	0		0
DF	(Japan)	Taku Watanabe	November 9, 1971 (aged 24)	187 cm / 79 kg	11	0	0	0	2	0	13	0
MF	(Japan)	Tōru Kishimoto	January 14, 1972 (aged 24)	171 cm / 65 kg	0	0		0	0	0		0
GK	(Japan)	Shinji Yamasaki	January 17, 1972 (aged 24)	185 cm / 81 kg	0	0		0	0	0		0
MF	(Brazil)	Manoel	March 2, 1972 (aged 24)	175 cm / 67 kg	22	5	2	1	10	2	34	8
MF	(Japan)	Kazunari Koga	April 17, 1972 (aged 23)	174 cm / 66 kg	23	1	2	0	5	0	30	1
FW	(Japan)	Hiroaki Morishima	April 30, 1972 (aged 23)	168 cm / 62 kg	26	9	1	0	14	4	41	13
MF	(Japan)	Takashi Yamahashi	May 31, 1972 (aged 23)	173 cm / 65 kg	10	0	0	0	4	0	14	0
DF	(Japan)	Shigeki Kurata	June 22, 1972 (aged 23)	178 cm / 73 kg	19	0	1	0	8	1	28	1
MF	(Japan)	Katsuhiro Minamoto	July 2, 1972 (aged 23)	176 cm / 70 kg	27	0	1	0	13	0	41	0
FW	(Japan)	Tomotaka Fukagawa	July 24, 1972 (aged 23)	180 cm / 72 kg	17	1	1	1	3	0	21	2
GK	(Japan)	Jirō Takeda	September 18, 1972 (aged 23)	178 cm / 72 kg	1	0	0	0	1	0	2	0
MF	(Japan)	Takayuki Yokoyama	December 22, 1972 (aged 23)	171 cm / 65 kg	13	4	2	0	9	1	24	5
MF	(Japan)	Naohiro Kitade	May 14, 1973 (aged 22)	176 cm / 70 kg	0	0		0	0	0		0
DF	(Japan)	Kenichi Serata	October 20, 1973 (aged 22)	177 cm / 73 kg	1	0	0	0	1	0	2	0
FW	(Japan)	Shinichi Satō	September 14, 1975 (aged 20)	174 cm / 72 kg	0	0		0	0	0		0
GK	(Japan)	Seigo Shimokawa	November 17, 1975 (aged 20)	183 cm / 75 kg	0	0		0	0	0		0
DF	(Japan)	Kōji Yamaguchi	November 20, 1975 (aged 20)	176 cm / 73 kg	0	0		0	0	0		0
MF	(Japan)	Tatsuya Kojima	June 25, 1976 (aged 19)	175 cm / 70 kg	0	0		0	0	0		0
MF	(Japan)	Katsutoshi Dōmori	June 29, 1976 (aged 19)	177 cm / 64 kg	0	0		0	0	0		0
DF	(Japan)	Takahiro Hatakeda	December 20, 1976 (aged 19)	173 cm / 63 kg	0	0		0	0	0		0
FW	(Japan)	Tarō Urabe	July 11, 1977 (aged 18)	169 cm / 60 kg	0	0	1	0	1	0	2	0
MF	(Japan)	Yoshinari Hyakutake	November 21, 1977 (aged 18)	181 cm / 80 kg	4	0	0	0	0	0	4	0
FW	(Japan)	Akinori Nishizawa †	June 18, 1976 (aged 19)	-cm / -kg	14	3	2	0	11	5	27	8
FW	(Japan)	Kazuo Shimizu †	April 30, 1975 (aged 20)	-cm / -kg	0	0		0	0	0		0
FW	(Brazil)	Guga †	June 14, 1964 (aged 31)	181 cm / 76 kg	4	0	0	0	0	0	4	0

- † player(s) joined the team after the opening of this season.

== Transfers ==
In:

No.	Pos.	Nation	Player
—	GK	JPN	Seigo Shimokawa (from Momoyama Gakuin University)
—	DF	JPN	Taku Watanabe (from Bellmare Hiratsuka)
—	DF	JPN	Kenichi Serata (from Kashima Antlers)
—	MF	JPN	Makoto Yonekura (from Nagoya Grampus Eight)
—	MF	BRA	Sérgio Manoel Júnior (from Botafogo)
—	MF	JPN	Yoshinari Hyakutake (from Kunimi High School)
—	FW	BRA	Francisco Narcizio (from Botafogo)
—	FW	JPN	Tarō Urabe (from Cerezo Osaka youth)

Out:

No.	Pos.	Nation	Player
—	DF	JPN	Hirokazu Sasaki (retired)
—	DF	BRA	Toninho
—	DF	JPN	Kōzaburō Shigeno (to Fujitsu)
—	DF	JPN	Tatsuya Morishige
—	DF	BRA	Júnior
—	MF	JPN	Tomoo Kudaka (retired)
—	MF	BRA	Bernardo
—	FW	PAN	Valdés (to Tosu Futures)
—	FW	JPN	Keisuke Makino
—	FW	JPN	Kazuhito Nigorisawa
—	FW	JPN	Yō Sasaki
—	FW	JPN	Tomoya Takehana (to Fujitsu)

== Transfers during the season ==
=== In ===
- (Japan) Akinori Nishizawa (loan return from FC Volendam on May)
- (Japan) Kazuo Shimizu (loan return from Gimnasia on July)
- (Brazil) Guga (on August)

== Awards ==
none

== Other pages ==
- (in Japanese) J.League official site
- (in Japanese) Cerezo Osaka official site
