= Hyakutake =

Hyakutake may refer to:

== Astronomy ==
- Comet Hyakutake, a comet discovered in 1996

== People ==
- Gengo Hyakutake (1882–1976), Imperial Japanese Navy admiral
- Harukichi Hyakutake (1888–1947), Imperial Japanese Army general
- Saburō Hyakutake (1872–1963), Imperial Japanese Navy admiral
- Tetsugo Hyakutake (b. 1975), Japanese artist and photographer
- Yoshinari Hyakutake,(b. 1977), Japanese football player
- Yuji Hyakutake (1950–2002), Japanese astronomer
