= 1960 in rail transport =

This article lists events related to rail transport that occurred in 1960.

== Events ==
=== January events ===
- January 1 – The New York Central Railroad drops its membership in the Railway Express Agency, citing large losses.
- January 3 – Washington, D.C., ends suburban and overhead trolley car operations.
- January 5 – Closure of Swansea and Mumbles Railway in Swansea (by now operated by electric trams).
- January 20 – The Cartier Railway opens Canada's northernmost railway to date between Port Cartier and Gagnon, Quebec.
- January 21 – The Settle rail crash in England kills 5 people.

=== February events ===
- February 22 – Canadian Pacific Railway operates its last steam locomotive powered train in regular service as freight train number 76, led by 4-6-2 number 1262, arrives in Montreal.

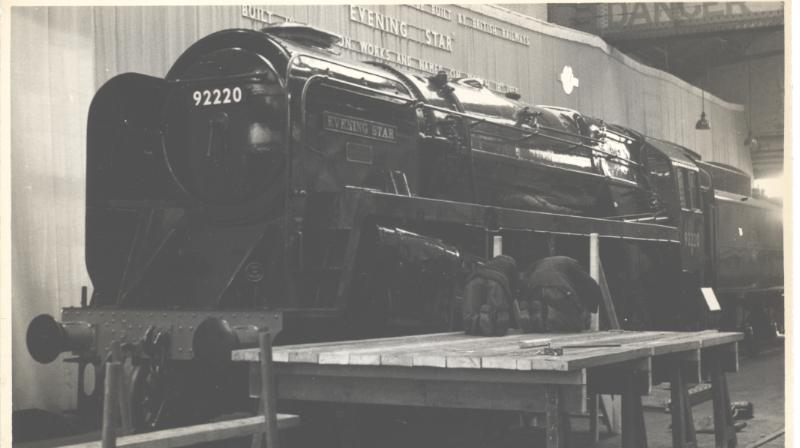
March: 92220 Evening Star at Swindon Works soon after naming

=== March events ===
- March 18 – Western Region of British Railways 2-10-0 standard class 9F 92220 Evening Star is named at Swindon Works to commemorate its completion as the last steam locomotive built for B.R.
- March 20 – The Pioneer Zephyr trainset makes its final revenue run on a trip from Lincoln, Nebraska, to Kansas City, Missouri. It then continues through Galesburg, Illinois, to Chicago, Illinois, in preparation for its final disposition.
- March 27 – The last regularly scheduled steam-powered passenger train on a major U.S. railroad runs from Durand to Detroit, Michigan, on the Grand Trunk Western Railway. Grand Trunk Western runs this train in two sections, due to the many people who want to see and ride history. Grand Truck Western Class 4-8-4 Class U3b #6319 pulls the first section, and #6322 the second.

=== April events ===
- April 25 – Canadian National Railway operates its last steam locomotive in regular service, 4-8-2 #6043, on train No. 76 from The Pas to Winnipeg.

=== May events ===
- May 22 – The St. Louis–San Francisco Railway (the "Frisco") combines the Firefly with the Sunnyland.
- May 26 – The Pioneer Zephyr trainset is donated to Chicago's Museum of Science and Industry.

=== June events ===
- June 18 – The Middleton Railway, at Leeds in England, becomes the first standard gauge line in Great Britain to be operated by volunteers as a preserved railway, initial services being worked by a diesel locomotive.

=== July events ===
- July 1 – The Midosuji Line in Osaka, Japan, is extended from Nishitanabe to Abiko.

=== August events ===
- August 1 – München Hauptbahnhof station reconstruction completed.
- August 7 – The Bluebell Railway, in Sussex, England, begins regular operation as the first standard gauge steam-operated passenger preserved railway in the world.

=== September events ===
- September – Grand Trunk Railway loses its New England railway post office and discontinues passenger service between Montreal and Portland, Maine except seasonally from July 1 to Labor Day in September.
- September 1 – Disgruntled railroad workers effectively halt operations of the Pennsylvania Railroad in the United States, marking the first shutdown in the company's history (the event lasts two days).
- September 6 – Last Gull passenger service between Boston and the Maritimes over the Boston & Maine, Maine Central, Canadian Pacific and Canadian National railroads.
- September 10 – Last slip coach working, at Bicester North on the Western Region of British Railways.
- September 12 – Official inauguration by the London Midland Region of British Railways of electric services between Crewe and Manchester Piccadilly at the new standard for main line electrification, 25 kV overhead wire at 50 cycles.

=== October events ===
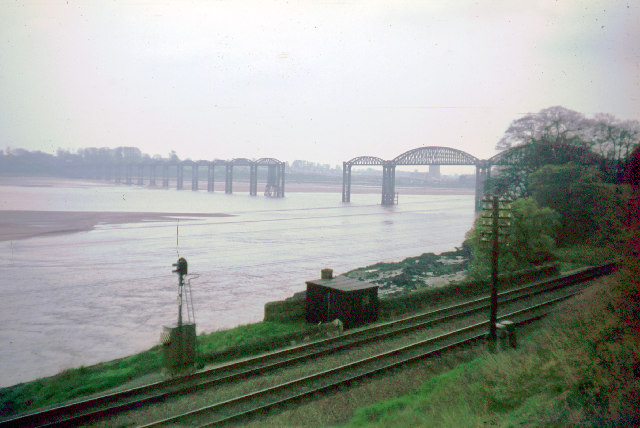
Damage to the Severn Railway Bridge

- October 15 – The Erie Railroad and the Delaware, Lackawanna and Western Railroad merge to form the Erie Lackawanna Railroad; Harry W. Von Miller, former Erie president, is chosen as the president of the new railroad.
- October 25 – Barges collide with one of the columns of the Severn Railway Bridge (England) in heavy fog, causing two of its twenty-two spans to collapse. The steel and cast iron bridge is never repaired.
- October 29 – Last State of Maine Express passenger service between New York City and Portland, Maine over the New Haven and Boston & Maine railroads.

=== November events ===
- November 1 – The Chicago and North Western Railway acquires the assets of the Minneapolis and St. Louis Railway.
- November 14 – Stéblová train disaster, Czechoslovakia: 117 are killed and 110 injured in a head-on collision.

=== December events ===
- December 4 – Opening of Tokyo Metropolitan Bureau of Transportation Line 1 (present Asakusa Line) between Oshiage and Asakusabashi Stations in Tokyo, Japan. Keisei Electric Railway also begins through service onto Line 1 via the Oshiage Line.
- December 10 – Japanese National Railways KiHa 80 series diesel multiple units enter public service on Hatsukari services, replacing steam.
- December 27 – The Romanian Railways officially start the electrification of the Predeal to Brașov line, by mounting the first catenary pole in Predeal station.

=== Unknown date events ===
- A new Soo Line Railroad is formed through a merger of the original Soo Line, Wisconsin Central Railway and the Duluth, South Shore and Atlantic Railway.
- The Dade County, Florida, Metropolitan Transit Authority (operator of Miami-Dade Transit) is formed.
- Operating losses increase for low ridership trains in the United States when railway post office service is discontinued.
- Completion of reconstruction of Napoli Centrale railway station in Italy (designed by Pier Luigi Nervi and others) and the Finland Station (Finlyandsky vokzal) in Leningrad, Soviet Union.
