= Nagai Station (Osaka) =

Railway and metro station in Osaka, Japan

Nagai 長居

General information
- Location: Nagaihigashi Yonchome, Sumiyoshi, Osaka, Osaka （大阪市住吉区長居東4丁目） Japan
- Operator: JR West; Osaka Metro
- Connections: Bus stop
Location

Nagai Station (長居駅, Nagai eki) is a railway station in Sumiyoshi-ku, Osaka, Japan. The station is served by the Hanwa Line of West Japan Railway Company (JR West) and the Midōsuji Line of Osaka Metro; the former uses elevated tracks and the latter uses underground tracks. The subway station is assigned the station number M26. Nagai is located south of Tennoji in Sumiyoshi-ku and maintains Nagai Park and Nagai Stadium, an international standard football stadium home to the J-League team Cerezo Osaka.

== Layout ==
=== JR West Hanwa Line ===
Nagai 長居
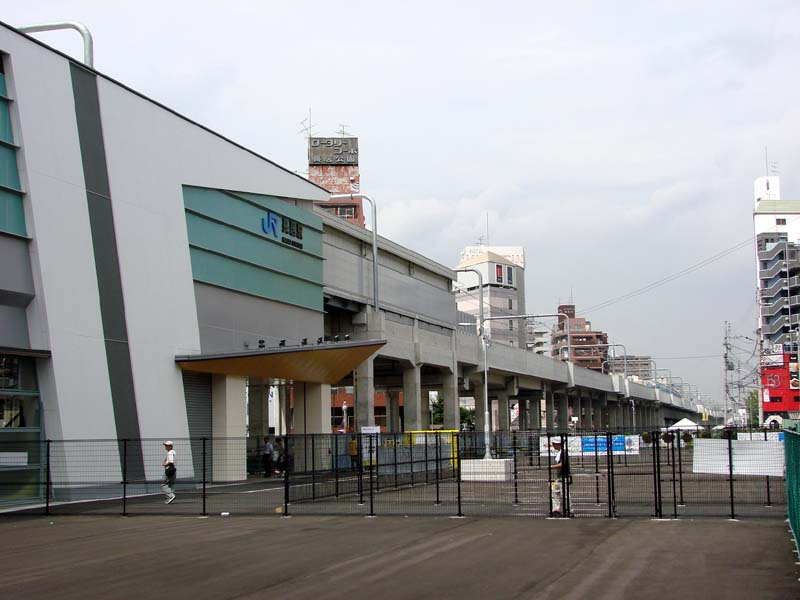
- JR station building

General information
- Location: 3-52, Nagaihigashi Yonchome, Sumiyoshi, Osaka, Osaka （大阪市住吉区長居東4丁目3-52） Japan
- Coordinates: 34°36′40.01″N 135°30′45.35″E
- System: JR West
- Operator: JR West
- Line: Hanwa Line
- Tracks: 2

Construction
- Structure type: Elevated

Other information
- Station code: JR-R24

History
- Opened: 18 July 1929; 97 years ago
- Former names: Rinnanji-mae (until 1944)

Services
Preceding station	JR West	Following station
Abikocho towards Wakayama	Hanwa Line Local	Tsurugaoka towards Tennoji
Location

This station is administrated by Sakaishi Station. When it was located on the ground level, Nagai Station had two island platforms serving 2 tracks each. The station is currently elevated (northbound in 2004, southbound in 2006) and has two side platforms serving a track each. Ticket gate is located in the north under the platforms and tracks.

1	■ Hanwa Line	for Ōtori, Hineno and Wakayama
2	■ Hanwa Line	for Tennōji

=== Osaka Metro Midosuji Line ===
Nagai 長居
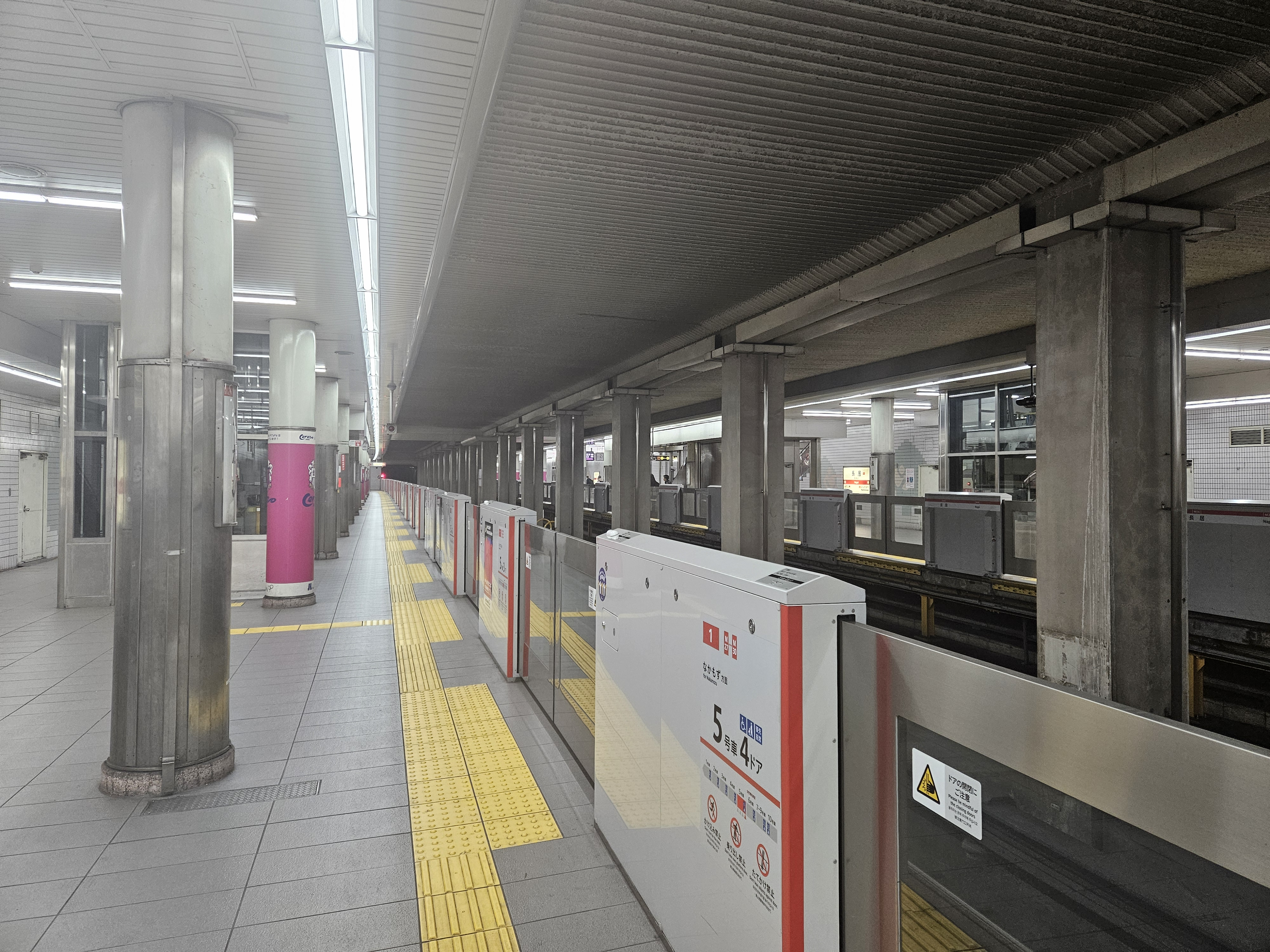
- Midosuji Line platform, December 2024

General information
- Location: 6-5, Nagaihigashi Yonchome, Sumiyoshi, Osaka, Osaka （大阪市住吉区長居東4丁目6-5） Japan
- Coordinates: 34°36′34.35″N 135°30′49.37″E
- System: Osaka Metro
- Operator: Osaka Metro
- Line: Midōsuji Line
- Platforms: 2 side platforms
- Tracks: 2

Construction
- Structure type: Underground
- Accessible: yes

Other information
- Station code: M 26
- Website: Official website

History
- Opened: 1 July 1960; 66 years ago

Services
Preceding station	Osaka Metro	Following station
Nishitanabe M 25 towards Esaka	Midōsuji Line	Abiko M 27 towards Nakamozu
Location

The station has two side platforms serving two tracks on the second basement. Ticket gates are located in the north and the south on the first basement.

1	■ Midosuji Line	for Abiko and Nakamozu
2	■ Midosuji Line	for Tennōji, Namba, Umeda and Minoh-kayano

== Surroundings ==
=== Nagai Park ===
- Nagai Stadium
- Nagai Ball Gall Field (YODOKO Sakura Stadium)
- Nagai Aid Stadium
- Nagai Pool
- Nagai Youth Hostel
- Nagai Botanical Garden
- Osaka Museum of Natural History
- Rinnan-ji

=== Schools ===
- Osaka Gakugei Senior High School
- Osaka Gakugei Secondary School
- Osaka Municipal Nagai Elementary School
- Osaka Municipal Abiko Junior High School

=== Shopping and finance ===
- Supermarket Life Nagai
- Kansai Super Nagai
- Nagai Hondori Shotengai
- The Kinki Osaka Bank Nagai Branch
- The Senshu-Ikeda Bank Nagai Branch
- The Juso Shinkin Bank Nagai Branch
- Japan Post Group
  - Sumiyoshi Nagai Post Office
  - Sumiyoshi Nagai-4 Post Office
  - Sumiyoshi Nagai-higashi Post Office

=== Buses ===
- Subway Nagai (Osaka Municipal Transportation Bureau)
  - Route 4 for Subway Suminoekoen / for Deto Bus Terminal
  - Route 24 for Sumiyoshi Shako-mae / for Minami-Nagai
  - Route 40 for Sumiyoshi Shako-mae / for Deto Bus Terminal
- Nagainishi Nichome (Osaka Municipal Transportation Bureau)
  - Route 24 for Sumiyoshi Shako-mae / for Minami-Nagai
  - Route 40 for Sumiyoshi Shako-mae / for Deto Bus Terminal

== History ==
- 18 July 1929 - Rinnanji-mae Station (臨南寺前駅) on Hanwa Electric Railway opened.
- 1 December 1940 - Hanwa Electric Railway became the Yamanote Line of Nankai Railway.
- 1 May 1944 - Yamanote Line was nationalized and became the Hanwa Line. Rinnanji-mae Station was renamed Nagai Station.
- 1 July 1960- Nagai Station on the Osaka Municipal Subway Midōsuji Line opened.
- 16 October 2004- Hanwa Line northbound station was elevated.
- 21 May 2006 - Hanwa Line southbound station was elevated.
- March 2018 - March 2018 - Station numbering was introduced to the Hanwa Line with Nagai being assigned station number JR-R24.
