= Nishitanabe Station =

Metro station in Osaka, Japan

Coordinates: 34°37′18″N 135°30′55″E

Nishitanabe 西田辺駅
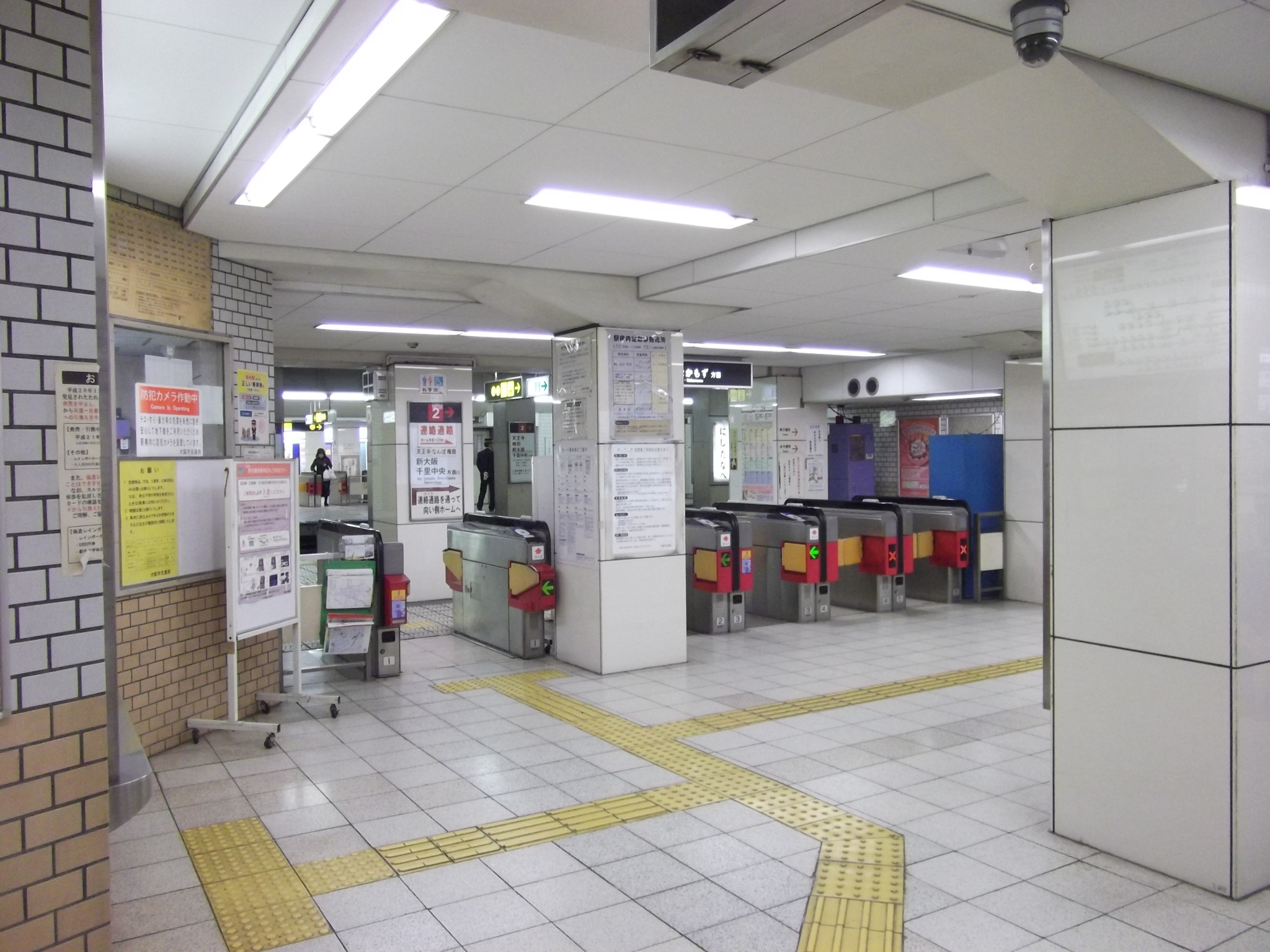
- Ticket gates on the Nakamozu-bound platform (February 2011)

General information
- Location: Japan
- System: Osaka Metro
- Operator: Osaka Metro
- Line: Midōsuji Line
- Platforms: 2 side platforms
- Tracks: 2
- Connections: Tsurugaoka Station

Construction
- Structure type: Underground
- Accessible: yes

Other information
- Station code: M 25
- Website: Official website

History
- Opened: 5 October 1952; 73 years ago

Passengers
- 2015: 26,186

Services
Preceding station	Osaka Metro	Following station
Shōwachō M 24 towards Esaka	Midōsuji Line	Nagai M 26 towards Nakamozu
Location
- Location within Osaka Prefecture Location within Japan

Nishitanabe Station (西田辺駅, Nishitanabe-eki) is a subway station on the Osaka Metro Midosuji Line in Abeno-ku, Osaka, Japan.

== Layout ==
There are two side platforms with two tracks underground.

G	Street Level	Exit/Entrance
B1F; Platform level	Mezzanine	Fare control, station agent, ticket/ICOCA/PiTaPa machines
B1F; Platform level	Side platform, doors will open on the left
B1F; Platform level	Platform 1	Midōsuji Line towards Nakamozu via Abiko (Nagai) →
B1F; Platform level	Platform 2	← Midōsuji Line towards Esaka via Tennoji, Namba, and Shin-Ōsaka (Shōwachō) (through service to Minoh-kayano)
B1F; Platform level	Side platform, doors will open on the left
B2F		Crossunder between platforms

1	■ Midōsuji Line	for Abiko and Nakamozu
2	■ Midōsuji Line	for Tennoji, Namba, Umeda and Minoh-kayano

== Surroundings ==
- Sharp Corporation Headquarters
- Nagaike Park
- Nagai Stadium (North)
- Tsurugaoka Station
