= Abiko Station =

Abiko Station (我孫子駅) is the name of two train stations in Japan:

- Abiko Station (Chiba) in Abiko, Chiba Prefecture, on the JR East Joban Line and the Narita Line
- Abiko Station (Osaka) in Sumiyoshi-ku, Osaka, on the Osaka Metro Midosuji Line
