= Japanese gunboat Katsura Maru Number Two =

Japanese auxiliary gunboat

Katsura Maru Number Two was a Japanese auxiliary gunboat built as a merchant ship at Urabe in 1937 and requisitioned by the Imperial Japanese Navy prior to the commencement of World War II.

She was sunk in the Sea of Okhotsk by USS S-28 on 20 September 1943.
