= Kitahanada Station =

Metro station in Sakai, Japan

Kitahanada Station 北花田駅
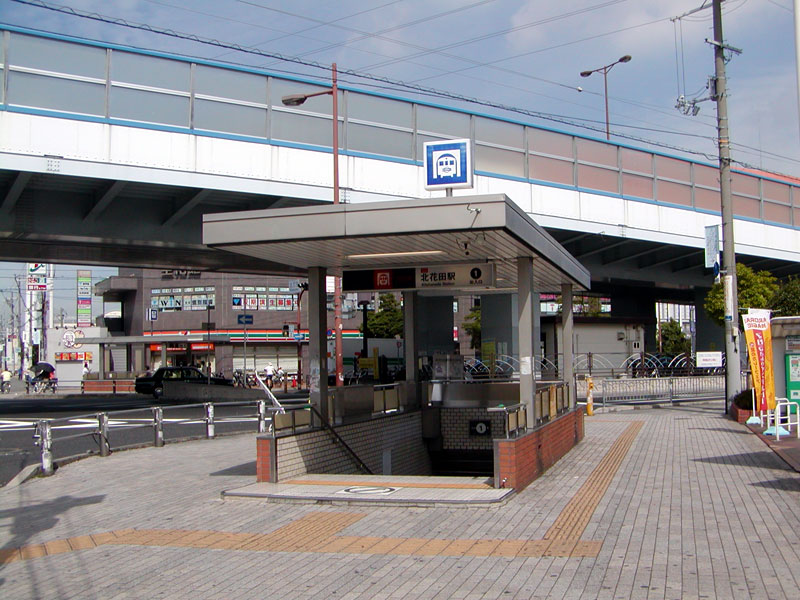
- Kitahanada Station No.1 exit

General information
- Location: 2-14-3 Kitahanada, Kita-ku, Sakai-shi, Osaka-fu 591-8002; Japan
- Coordinates: 34.5816°N 135.5166°E
- System: Osaka Metro
- Operator: Osaka Metro
- Line: Midōsuji Line
- Distance: 21.4 km (13.3 mi) from Esaka
- Platforms: 1 island platform
- Tracks: 2

Construction
- Structure type: Underground
- Accessible: yes

Other information
- Station code: M 28
- Website: Official website

History
- Opened: 18 April 1987; 39 years ago

Passengers
- 2020: 22,864 daily

Services
Preceding station	Osaka Metro	Following station
Abiko M 27 towards Esaka	Midōsuji Line	Shinkanaoka M 29 towards Nakamozu
Location
- Location within Osaka Prefecture Location within Japan

Kitahanada (北花田駅, Kitahanada eki) is a metro station located in Kita ward, Sakai, Osaka Prefecture, Japan, operated by the Osaka Metro. It has the station number "M28".

== Lines ==
Kitahanada Station is served by the Midōsuji Line, and is 21.4 kilometers from the terminus of the line at Esaka and 29.8 kilometers from Minoh-kayano.

== Layout ==
The station consists of one underground island platform.

=== Platforms ===
1	■ Midōsuji Line	to Nakamozu
2	■ Midōsuji Line	for Tennōji, Namba, Umeda and Minoh-kayano

== History ==
Kitahanada Station opened on April 18, 1987.

The facilities of the Midosuji Line were inherited by Osaka Metro after the privatization of the Osaka Municipal Transportation Bureau on 1 April 2018.

== Passenger statistics ==
In fiscal 2020, the station was used by an average of 22,864 passengers daily.

== Surrounding area ==
- eon Sakai Kitahanada store
- Sakai City Gokasho Higashi Elementary School
- Sakai City Gokasho Elementary School
- Sakai City Shin-Asakayama Elementary School

== See also ==
- List of railway stations in Japan
