= Takayuki Yokoyama =

Japanese footballer

Takayuki Yokoyama 横山 貴之
Personal information
- Full name: Takayuki Yokoyama
- Date of birth: December 22, 1972 (age 53)
- Place of birth: Kochi, Japan
- Height: 1.71 m (5 ft 7 1/2 in)
- Position: Forward

Youth career
- 1988–1990: Katano High School
- 1991–1994: Kansai University

Senior career*
Years	Team	Apps	(Gls)
1995–1999	Cerezo Osaka	92	(20)
2000–2002	Shimizu S-Pulse	39	(8)
2003	Sagawa Express Osaka	29	(13)
Total		160	(41)
Medal record
Shimizu S-Pulse
Winner	Emperor's Cup	2001
Runner-up	Emperor's Cup	2000
- * Club domestic league appearances and goals

Takayuki Yokoyama (横山 貴之, Yokoyama Takayuki; born December 22, 1972) is a former Japanese football player.

== Playing career ==
Yokoyama was born in Kochi Prefecture on December 22, 1972. After graduating from Kansai University, he joined newly was promoted to J1 League club, Cerezo Osaka in 1995. He played many matches as substitute forward. He also played as starting member when Hiroaki Morishima and Akinori Nishizawa left the club for Japan national team. In 2000, he moved to Shimizu S-Pulse. In 2000, although he could not play many matches in league competition, the club won the 2nd place in Emperor's Cup. In 2001, he played many matches and the club won the champions 2001 Emperor's Cup. In Asia, the club won the 3rd place in 2000–01 Asian Cup Winners' Cup. At the 3rd place match, he scored 2 goals including winning goal. In 2003, he moved to Japan Football League club Sagawa Express Osaka. He retired end of 2003 season.

== Club statistics ==
Club performance			League		Cup		League Cup		Total	
Season	Club	League	Apps	Goals	Apps	Goals	Apps	Goals	Apps	Goals
Japan			League		Emperor's Cup		J.League Cup		Total	
1995	Cerezo Osaka	J1 League	8	0	1	0	-		9	0
1996	Cerezo Osaka	J1 League	13	4	2	0	9	1	24	5
1997	Cerezo Osaka	J1 League	30	11	2	0	4	1	36	12
1998	Cerezo Osaka	J1 League	24	4	1	0	0	0	25	4
1999	Cerezo Osaka	J1 League	17	1	2	1	4	1	23	3
2000	Shimizu S-Pulse	J1 League	5	0	5	2	2	0	12	2
2001	Shimizu S-Pulse	J1 League	23	8	4	1	1	0	28	9
2002	Shimizu S-Pulse	J1 League	11	0	3	0	6	0	20	0
2003	Sagawa Express Osaka	Football League	29	13	-		-		29	13
Total			160	41	20	4	26	3	206	48
