= Osaka Museum of Natural History =

Museum in Ōsaka, Japan

- 大阪市立自然史博物館
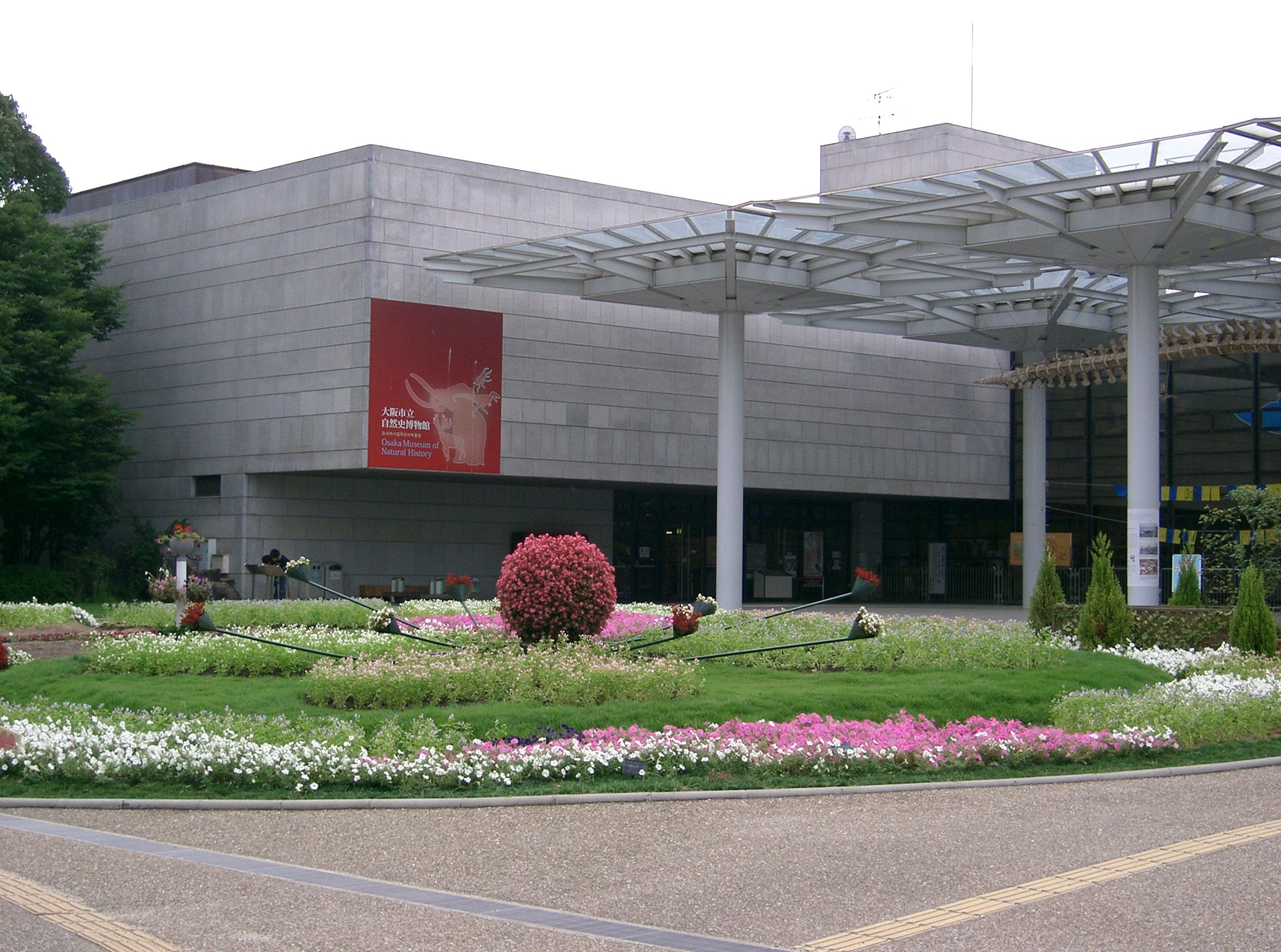
- Interactive map of the Osaka Museum of Natural History area

General information
- Location: Nagai Park 1-23, Higashisumiyoshi-ku, Ōsaka, Ōsaka Prefecture, Japan
- Coordinates: 34°36′37″N 135°31′21″E
- Opened: 10 November 1950 (in Osaka City Museum of Fine Arts); 13 January 1958 (in Nishi-ku); 27 April 1974 (in Nagai Park)

Website
- Official website

Osaka Museum of Natural History (大阪市立自然史博物館, Ōsaka-shi-ritsu Shizen-shi Hakubutsukan) is a museum of natural history in Higashisumiyoshi-ku, Ōsaka, Japan.

== History ==
A preparatory committee for the establishment of the museum was set up in 1949, and late the following year the first display opened on the second floor of Osaka City Museum of Fine Arts. Designated a museum-equivalent facility in accordance with the Museum Act in 1952, the Osaka Museum of Natural Science (大阪市立自然科学博物館) opened in a repurposed elementary school in 1958. This predecessor institution closed to the public in 1973. The renamed Osaka Museum of Natural History opened in Nagai Park in 1974.

== Collections ==
The collection comprises over one million items, while the display includes the Pleistocene megafauna Palaeoloxodon naumanni (Naumann's elephant) and Sinomegaceros yabei (ja) (Yabe's giant deer).

== Publications ==
- Bulletin of the Osaka Museum of Natural History (大阪市立自然史博物館研究報告)

== See also ==
- Museums in Osaka
- Wildlife of Japan
