= Shōwachō Station (Osaka) =

Metro station in Osaka, Japan

Coordinates: 34°38′01″N 135°31′01″E

Shōwachō Station 昭和町駅
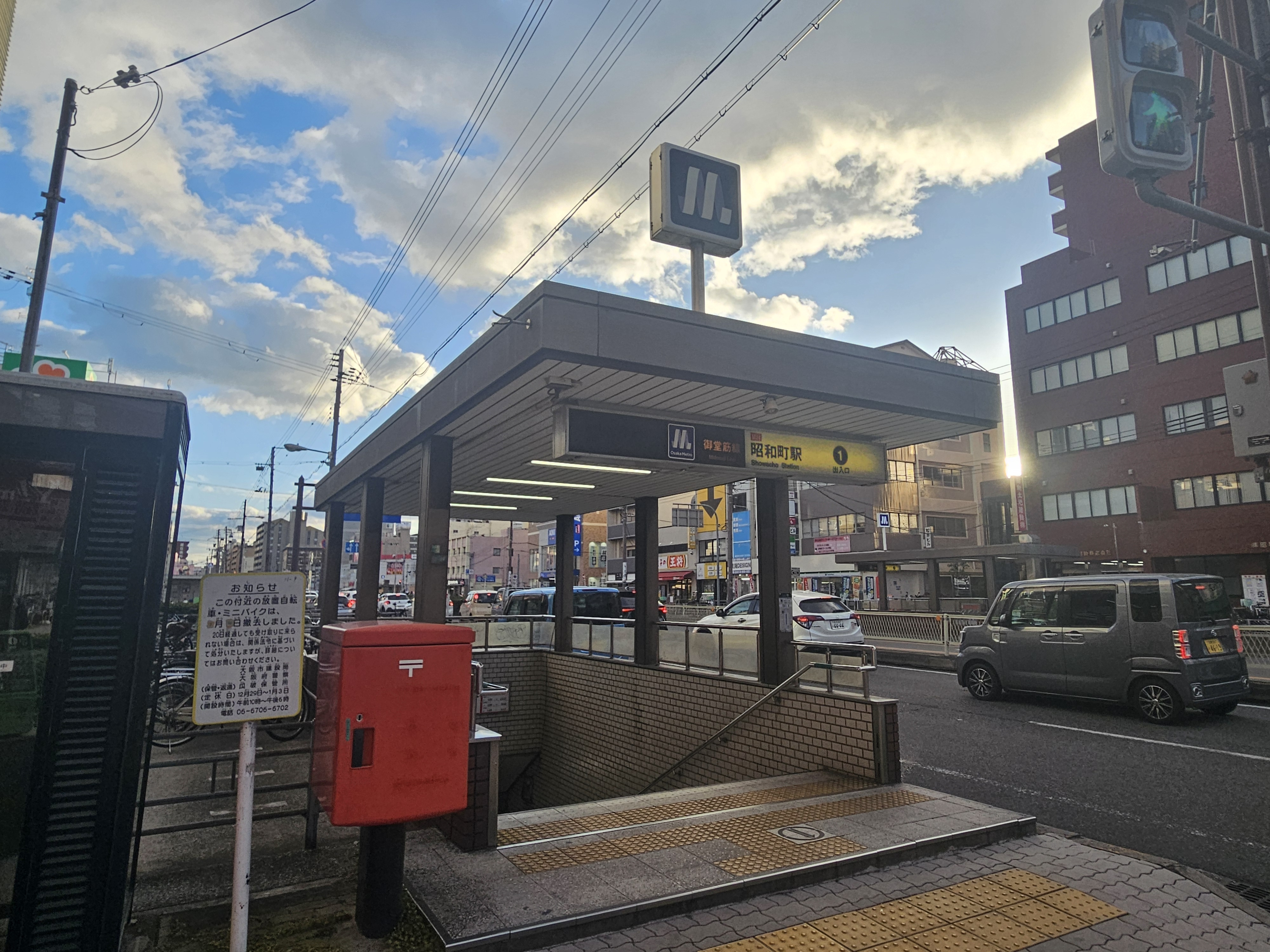
- Exit No. 1 in February 2025

General information
- Location: 1-9-26 Shōwachō, Abeno-ku, Osaka, Osaka; Japan
- System: Osaka Metro
- Operator: Osaka Metro
- Line: Midōsuji Line
- Distance: 15.7 km (9.8 mi) from Esaka
- Platforms: 2 side platforms
- Tracks: 2

Construction
- Structure type: Underground
- Accessible: yes

Other information
- Station code: M 24
- Website: Official website

History
- Opened: 20 December 1951; 74 years ago

Passengers
- FY2011: 22,741 daily

Services
Preceding station	Osaka Metro	Following station
Tennōji M 23 towards Esaka	Midōsuji Line	Nishitanabe M 25 towards Nakamozu
Location
- Location within Osaka Prefecture Location within Japan

Shōwachō Station (昭和町駅, Shōwachō-eki) is a subway station on the Osaka Metro Midōsuji Line in Abeno-ku, Osaka, Japan, south east of Tennoji. The station is numbered "M24".

While situated relatively close to Fuminosato Station on the Tanimachi Line, there are no transfer passageways between the two stations.

== Lines ==
Shōwachō Station is served by the Midōsuji Line, and is located 15.7 km from the starting point of the line at Esaka.

== Station layout ==
There are two side platforms with two tracks under Abiko-suji, on the second basement ("B2F") level.

=== Platforms ===
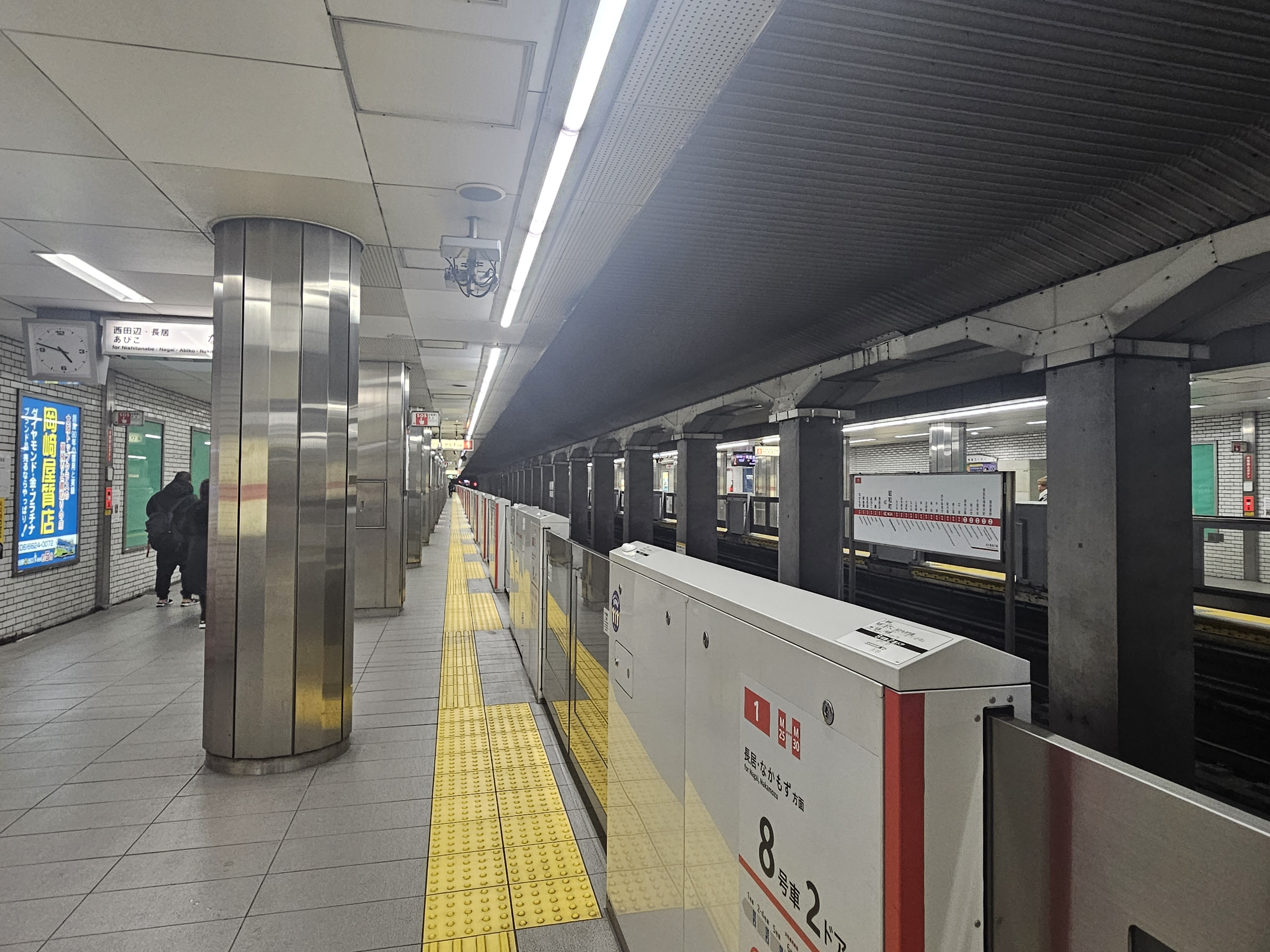
The platforms in February 2025

1	■ Midōsuji Line	for Abiko and Nakamozu
2	■ Midōsuji Line	for Tennōji, Namba, Umeda, and Minoh-kayano

== History ==
The station opened on 20 December 1951.

== Passenger statistics ==
In fiscal 2011, the station was used by an average of 22,741 passengers daily.

== Surrounding area ==
The station is located in a largely residential area; there are convenience stores, small izakayas, and a covered shopping street of local independent traders.

- Fuminosato Station (Tanimachi Line)
- Okazakiya
- Momogaike Park
- Shodokan Aikido Hombu Dojo (the head dojo of Shodokan Aikido)

== See also ==
- List of railway stations in Japan
