= Nagai Botanical Garden =

Botanical garden in Osaka, Japan

Coordinates: 34°36′38″N 135°31′18″E

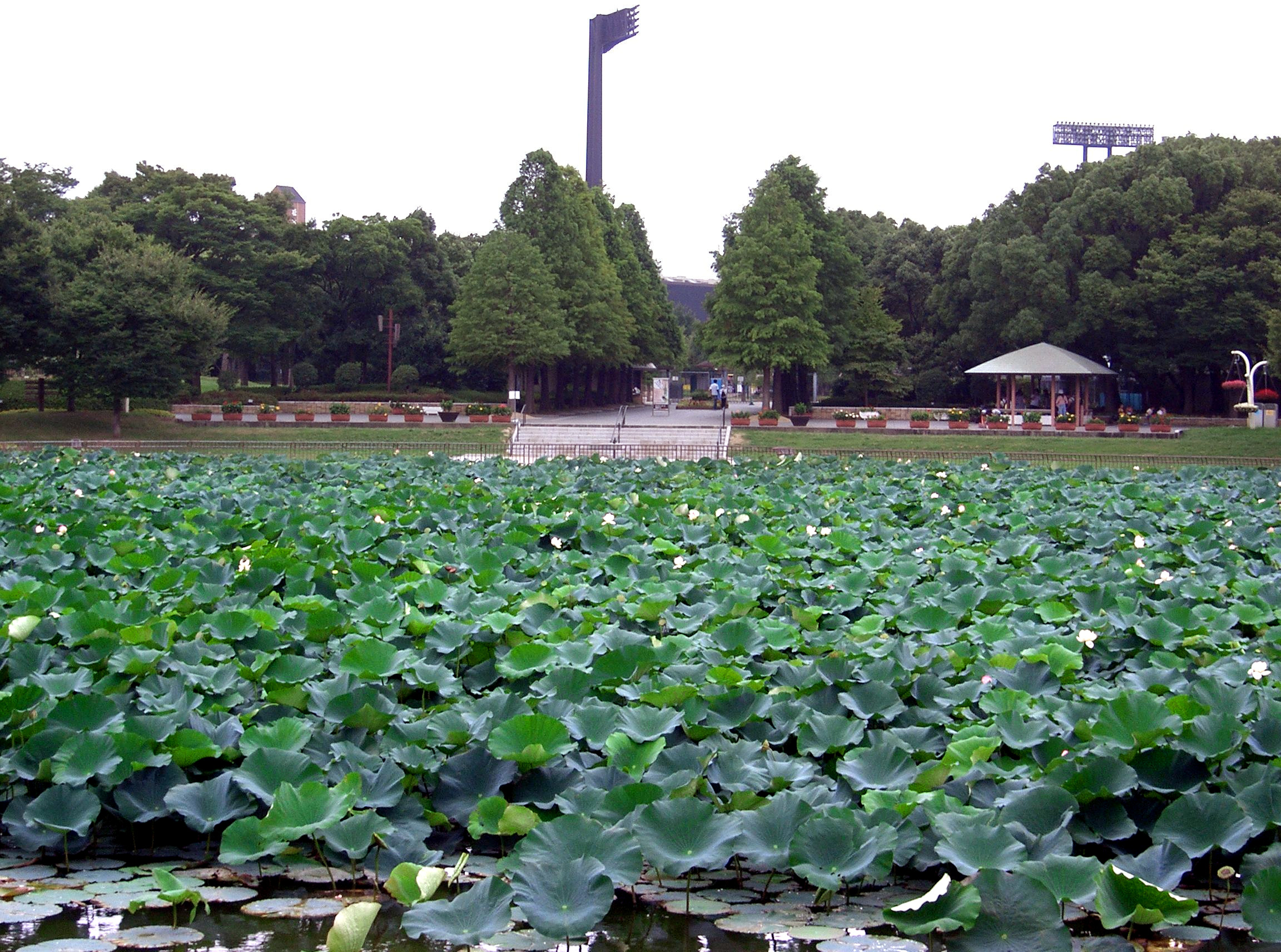
Nagai Botanical Garden

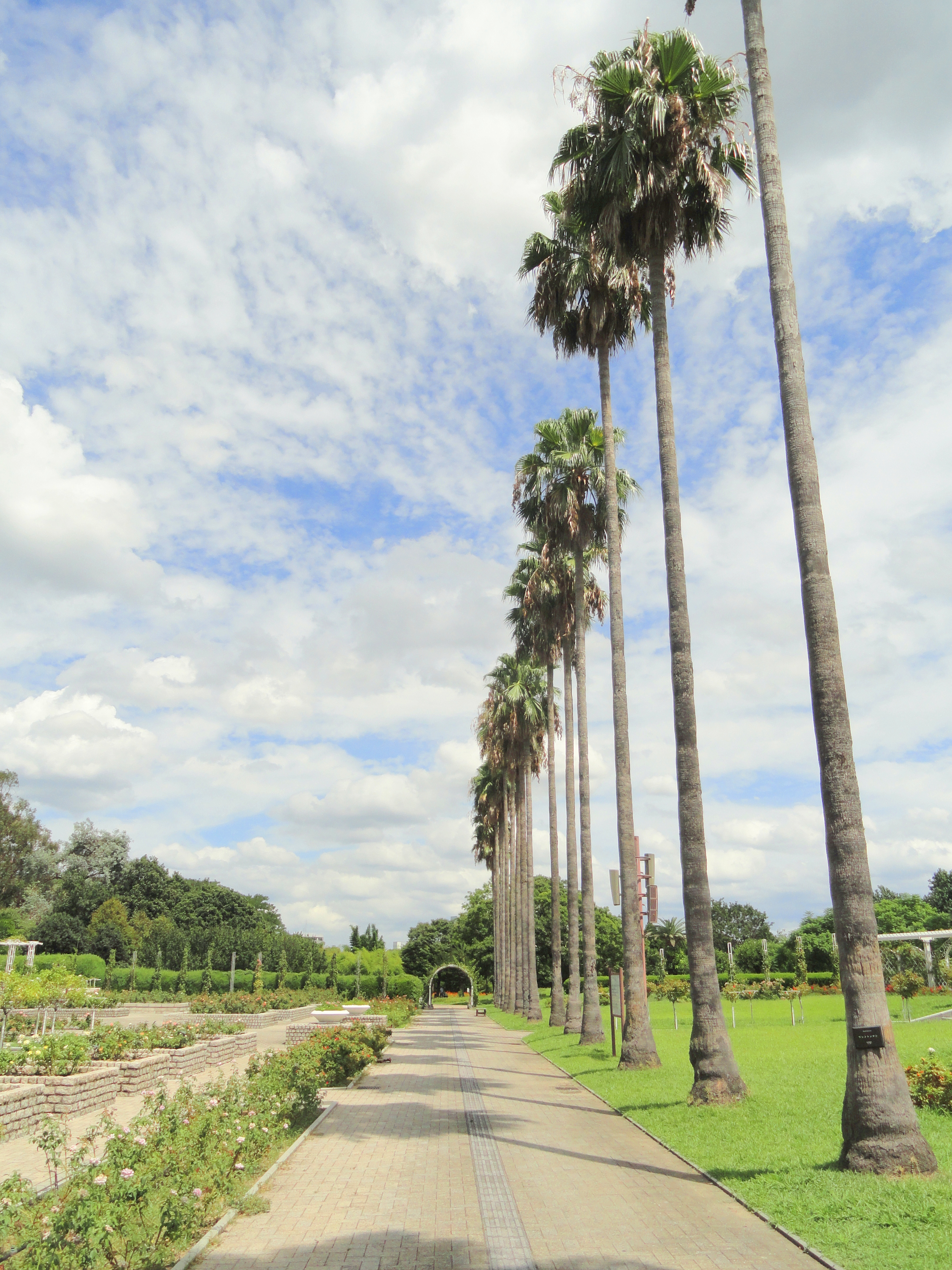
Row of palm trees

The Nagai Botanical Garden (大阪市立長居植物園, Ōsaka Shiritsu Nagai Shokubutsuen) is a botanical garden located in the southern part of Nagai Park, Higashisumiyoshi-ku, Osaka, Japan. An admission fee is charged for adults, while middle school students and under are free.

It opened in 1974. The garden contains the Osaka Museum of Natural History as well as 1,000 species of trees around a central pond. It also contains an installation created by the art collective TeamLab.

== See also ==
- List of botanical gardens in Japan
