= Urabe =

Urabe (written: 卜部, 浦邊, 浦辺 or 占部) is a Japanese surname. Notable people with the surname include:

- Hideo Urabe (浦辺 秀夫, born 1951), Japanese ice hockey player
- Jotaro Urabe (占部 城太郎, born 1959), Japanese biologist
- Koya Urabe (卜部 功也, born 1990), Japanese kickboxer
- Masayoshi Urabe (浦邊 雅祥, born 1965), Japanese musician
- Taro Urabe (卜部 太郎, born 1977), Japanese footballer
- Urabe no Suetake (卜部 季武, 950–1022), Japanese samurai
- Yumiko Urabe (占部 由美子, born 1959), Japanese pianist

== Fictional characters ==
- Eigen Urabe (浦部 永玄), a supporting character in Go! Go! Loser Ranger!
- Mikoto Urabe (卜部 美琴), the main heroine of Mysterious Girlfriend X
- Yukito Urabe (卜部 征人), the main protagonist of KamiKatsu
