= Tsurugaoka Station =

Railway station in Osaka, Japan

Tsurugaoka Station 鶴ヶ丘駅
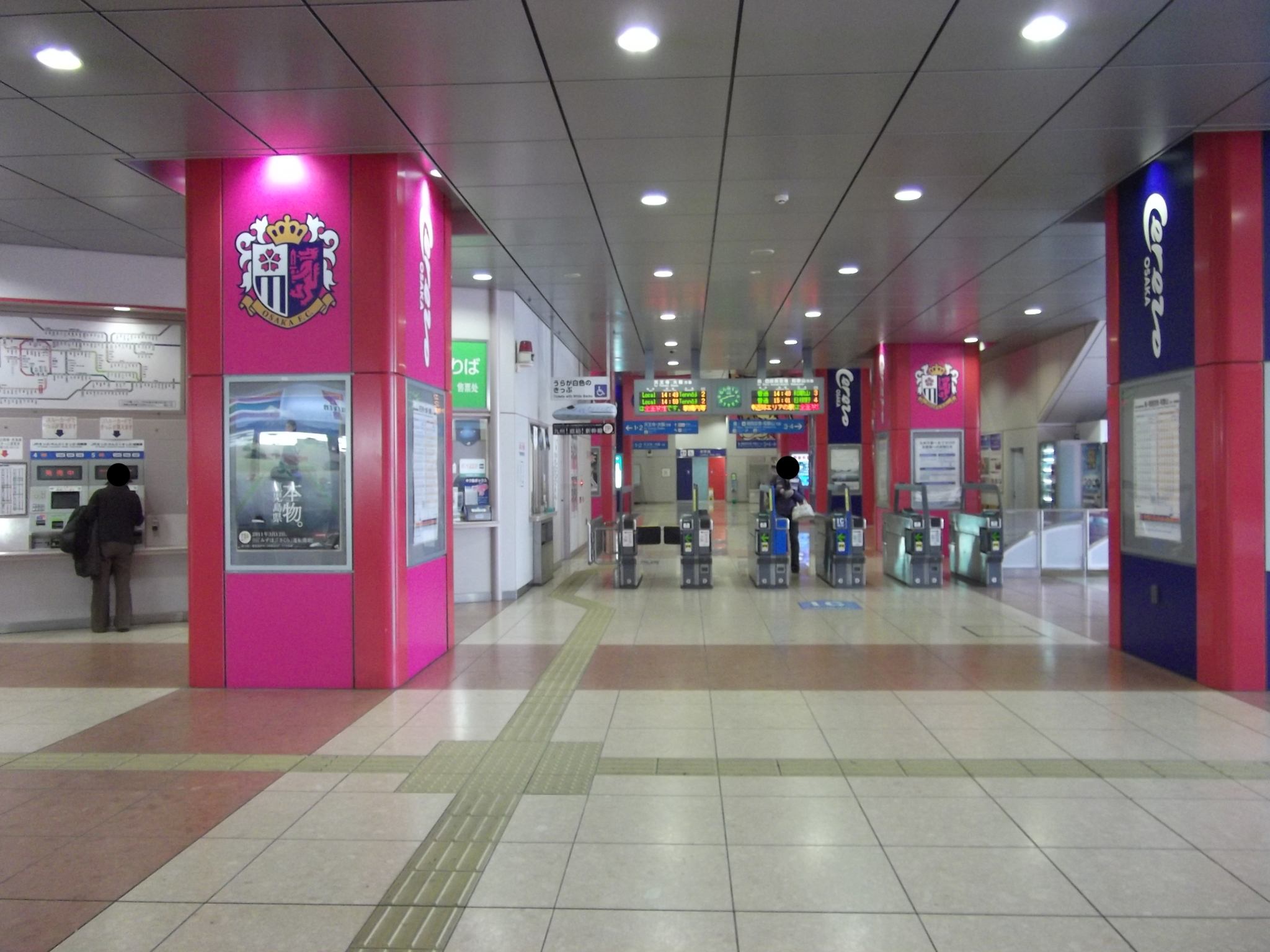
- Concourse of the station

General information
- Location: 3-18, Nishi-Tanabechō Nichome, Abeno, Osaka, Osaka （大阪市阿倍野区西田辺町二丁目3-18） Japan
- Coordinates: 34°37′3.8″N 135°30′59.81″E
- Operator: JR West
- Line: Hanwa Line
- Platforms: 2 Island platforms
- Tracks: 4
- Connections

Other information
- Station code: JR-R23

History
- Opened: 1938
- Former names: Hanwa Tsurugaoka; Nankai Tsurugaoka (until 1944)

Services
Preceding station	JR West	Following station
Nagai towards Wakayama	Hanwa Line Local	Minami-Tanabe towards Tennoji
Location

Tsurugaoka Station (鶴ヶ丘駅, Tsurugaoka-eki) is a railway station on the West Japan Railway Company (JR West) Hanwa Line in Nishi-Tanabecho Nichome, Abeno-ku, Osaka, Osaka Prefecture, Japan. When the platforms and the tracks were located on the ground, the station was located in Yamasaka Gochome, Higashisumiyoshi-ku. It is administrated by Sakaishi Station.

This station has been decorated Cerezo Osaka association football team color, logo and players since 2009 as it is the nearest station to Nagai Park, Nagai Stadium and Nagai Ball Gall Field (Kincho Stadium), the home of Cerezo.

== Layout ==
When the station was located on the ground level, it had two side platforms serving 1 track each. After the elevation (northbound in 2004, southbound in 2006), it has two island platforms serving two tracks each.

1, 2	■ Hanwa Line	for Tennoji
3, 4	■ Hanwa Line	for Otori, Hineno and Wakayama

== Surroundings ==
- Nagai Park
  - Nagai Stadium
  - Nagai Ball Gall Field (Kincho Stadium)
- Sharp Corporation
- Nishitanabe Station (Osaka Municipal Subway Midosuji Line)

== History ==
- 1938 - Station opened
- March 2018 - Station numbering was introduced with Tsurugaoka being assigned station number JR-R23.
