= Francisco Narcizio =

Brazilian footballer (born 1971)

Personal information
- Full name: Francisco Narcizio Abreu de Lima
- Date of birth: July 18, 1971 (age 55)
- Place of birth: Brazil
- Height: 1.78 m (5 ft 10 in)
- Position: Forward

Senior career*
Years	Team	Apps	(Gls)
1991–1992	Ceará		
1992–1993	Yverdon		
1993	Ferroviário		
1994	Figueirense		
1995	Botafogo		
1996	Cerezo Osaka		
1997	Vitória		
1998	Intenacional		
1998	Rio Branco-SP		
1999	Ponte Preta		
1999	Ituano		
1999–2000	Paraná		
2000	Ponte Preta		
2001	América Mineiro		
2001	Paraná		
2003–2004	Avaí		
2005	Ferroviário		
- * Club domestic league appearances and goals

Francisco Narcizio Abreu de Lima (born July 18, 1971) is a former Brazilian football player.

== Club statistics ==
Club performance			League		Cup		League Cup		Total	
Season	Club	League	Apps	Goals	Apps	Goals	Apps	Goals	Apps	Goals
Japan			League		Emperor's Cup		J.League Cup		Total	
1996	Cerezo Osaka	J1 League	12	5	0	0	8	2	20	7
Total			12	5	0	0	8	2	20	7
