= Tetsugo Hyakutake =

Japanese artist and photographer (born 1975)

Tetsugo Hyakutake (百武 てつ吾, Hyakutake Tetsugo; born 1975 in Tokyo, grew up in Kawasaki, Japan) is a Japanese artist and photographer. His work has been exhibited in Tokyo, Philadelphia, New York, Madrid, and Venice.

== Biography ==
Hyakutake graduated from the University of the Arts in 2006 with a Bachelor of Fine Arts in Photography, receiving the Promising Artist Award and Society for Photographic Education Mid-Atlantic Region Scholarship Award. In 2009, Hyakutake obtained a master's degree of Fine Arts from the University of Pennsylvania, where he was awarded a Toby Devan Lewis Fellowship. In 2009 he was a winner of the International Photography Awards Competition for his project Post-Industrialization.

Hyakutake’s work is fueled by historical, economic, and social issues of post-war Japan connected to his own personal experiences and the voices of his generation.

Hyakutake currently lives and works in Japan.

== Solo exhibitions ==
- 2010 Pathos:Tetsugo Hyakutake, Alan Klotz Gallery, New York, NY
- 2011 Ephemeral Existence:Tetsugo Hyakutake, Gallery339, Philadelphia, PA
- 2018 Postwar Conditions:Tetsugo Hyakutake, Camera Austria, Graz, Austria

== Selected exhibitions ==
- 2003: Danica, Yokikai Photo Exhibition, Ginza, Tokyo, Japan
- 2004: Vanessa, Yokikai Photo Exhibition, Ginza, Tokyo, Japan
- 2005: Day to Day, Day by Day, Yokikai Photo Exhibition, Ginza, Tokyo, Japan (Received the Award of Distinction)
- 2006: The University of the Arts Thesis Exhibition, Philadelphia, PA
- 2007: The University of Pennsylvania MFA First Year Exhibition, Class of 2009, Philadelphia, PA
- 2008: The AIPAD Photography Show 2008, New York, NY
- 2008: The University of Pennsylvania, Self-Generated Exhibition, Class of 2009, Philadelphia, PA
- 2009: Extended Views: Tetsugo Hyakutake + Daniel Lobdell, Gallery339, Philadelphia, PA
- 2009: Costa Nostra (Our Thing) Show, Alan Klotz Gallery, New York, NY
- 2009: The University of Pennsylvania “La Jetee” Exhibition, Philadelphia, PA
- 2009: The University of Pennsylvania MFA Thesis Exhibition, Class of 2009, Philadelphia, PA
- 2009: The University of Pennsylvania East West South North Exhibition, Philadelphia, PA
- 2009: PHotoEspaña 2009, Madrid, Spain
- 2009: The University of Pennsylvania MFA Thesis Exhibition, Class of 2009, New York, NY
- 2009: 2009 International Photography Awards Best of Show, New York, NY
- 2010: Open Video Call: Selected Works 2009-2010, Institute of Contemporary Art, Philadelphia, Pa
- 2010: Imperial Video, Ramis Barquet, New York, NY

== Awards ==
- 2003: Best of Quarter Award, The Art Institute of Philadelphia, Philadelphia, PA
- 2005: The Innova fine paper award for inkjet printmaking
- 2005: Society for Photographic Education, Mid Atlantic Region, Scholarship Award
- 2005-06: Promising Artist Award, The University of the Arts, Philadelphia, PA
- 2006: Shades of Paper Award, The Innova fine paper award for inkjet printmaking
- 2006: Best of Photography, Photographer’s Forum Magazine Annual Spring Photography Contest, Finalist
- 2009-2010: Fleisher Art Memorial Challenge Artist
- 2009: Toby Devan Lewis Fellowship
- 2009: Third place in Architecture (Buildings), International Photography Awards Competition
- 2009: First place in Architecture (Bridges), International Photography Awards Competition
