= Taro Urabe =

Japanese footballer (born 1977)

Taro Urabe 卜部 太郎
Personal information
- Full name: Taro Urabe
- Date of birth: July 11, 1977 (age 49)
- Place of birth: Akashi, Hyogo, Japan
- Height: 1.69 m (5 ft 6 1/2 in)
- Position: Forward

Youth career
- 1993–1995: Cerezo Osaka

Senior career*
Years	Team	Apps	(Gls)
1996–1998	Cerezo Osaka	23	(0)
1999	Montedio Yamagata	15	(1)
2000–2008	Rochedale Rovers		
Total		38	(1)
- * Club domestic league appearances and goals

Taro Urabe (卜部 太郎, Urabe Tarō; born July 11, 1977) is a former Japanese football player.

== Playing career ==
Urabe was born in Akashi on July 11, 1977. He joined J1 League club Cerezo Osaka from youth team in 1996. Although he could hardly play in the match in 1996, he played many matches as forward and offensive midfielder from 1997. In 1999, he moved to newly was promoted to J2 League club, Montedio Yamagata and played in 1 season. In 2000, he moved to Australian club Rochedale Rovers. He retired end of 2008 season.

== Club statistics ==
Club performance			League		Cup		League Cup		Total	
Season	Club	League	Apps	Goals	Apps	Goals	Apps	Goals	Apps	Goals
Japan			League		Emperor's Cup		J.League Cup		Total	
1996	Cerezo Osaka	J1 League	0	0	1	0	1	0	2	0
1997	Cerezo Osaka	J1 League	15	0	0	0	2	0	17	0
1998	Cerezo Osaka	J1 League	8	0	0	0	0	0	8	0
1999	Montedio Yamagata	J2 League	15	1	4	1	2	0	21	2
Total			38	1	5	1	5	0	48	2
