= Yoshinari Hyakutake =

Japanese footballer

Yoshinari Hyakutake 百武 義成
Personal information
- Full name: Yoshinari Hyakutake
- Date of birth: November 21, 1977 (age 48)
- Place of birth: Kawatana, Nagasaki, Japan
- Height: 1.81 m (5 ft 11 1/2 in)
- Position: Defender

Youth career
- 1993–1995: Kunimi High School

Senior career*
Years	Team	Apps	(Gls)
1996–1998	Cerezo Osaka	24	(0)
1999–2000	Denso		
Total		24	(0)
- * Club domestic league appearances and goals

Yoshinari Hyakutake (百武 義成, Hyakutake Yoshinari; born November 21, 1977) is a former Japanese football player.

== Playing career ==
Hyakutake was born in Kawatana, Nagasaki on November 21, 1977. After graduating from high school, he joined the J1 League club Cerezo Osaka in 1996. He played in many matches as a left side back and defensive midfielder. In 1999, he moved to the Japan Football League club Denso. He retired at the end of the 2000 season.

== Career statistics ==
Appearances and goals by club, season and competition
Club	Season	League			Emperor's Cup		J.League Cup		Total	
Club	Season	Division	Apps	Goals	Apps	Goals	Apps	Goals	Apps	Goals
Cerezo Osaka	1996	J1 League	4	0	0	0	0	0	4	0
Cerezo Osaka	1997	J1 League	14	0	2	0	0	0	16	0
Cerezo Osaka	1998	J1 League	6	0			3	0	9	0
Career total			24	0	2	0	3	0	29	0
