= Nagai Park =

Park and sports complex in Osaka, Japan

Coordinates: 34°36′43″N 135°31′14″E

- 長居公園
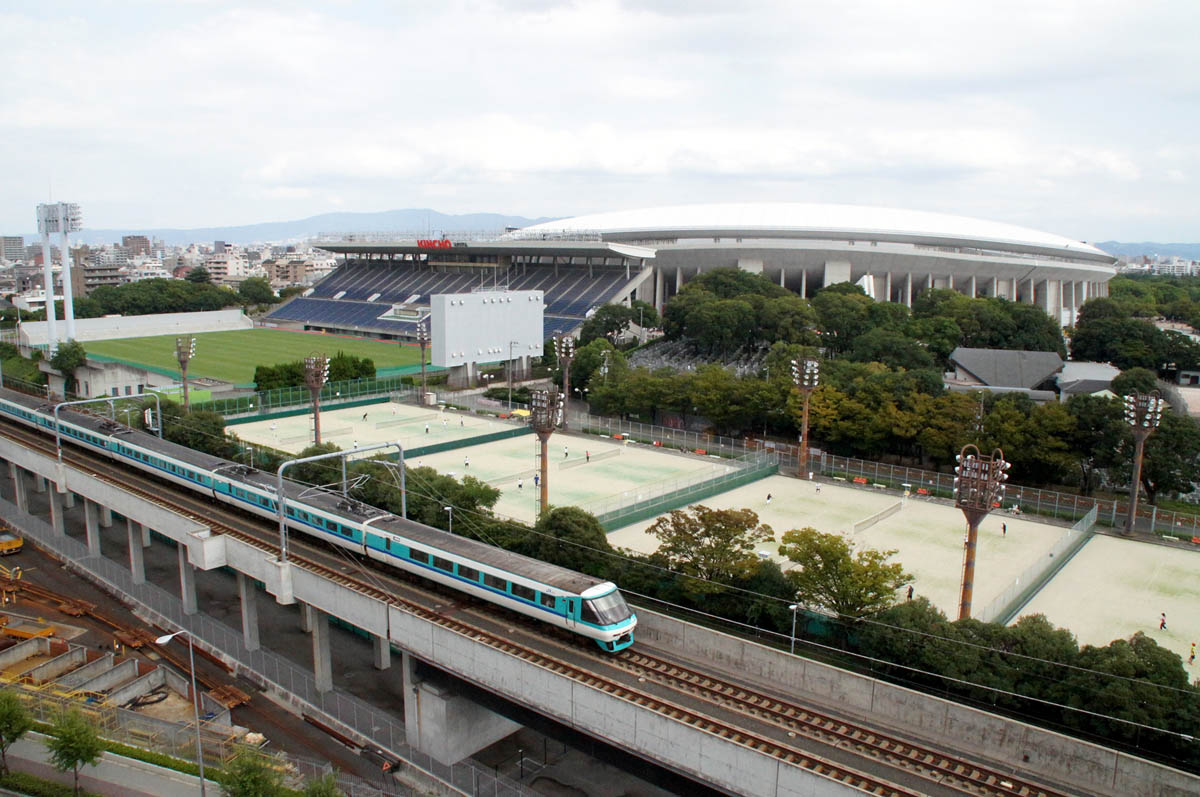
- Sports venues at Nagai Park, including the Nagai Stadium in the background.
- Interactive map of Nagai Park
- Type: Sports complex
- Main venue: Nagai Stadium; Capacity: 55,000

Website
- nagaipark.com

Nagai Park (長居公園, Nagai kōen) is a large sports complex located in Higashisumiyoshi-ku, Osaka. Its facilities include three multipurpose sports stadiums, including 50,000-seat Nagai Stadium; Nagai Botanical Garden, which has over 1,000 species of trees and flowers; a swimming pool and gymnasium; and a tract of preserved local forest. It also hosts a large number of cherry trees and is a popular area for picnics during cherry blossom (sakura) season in early spring.

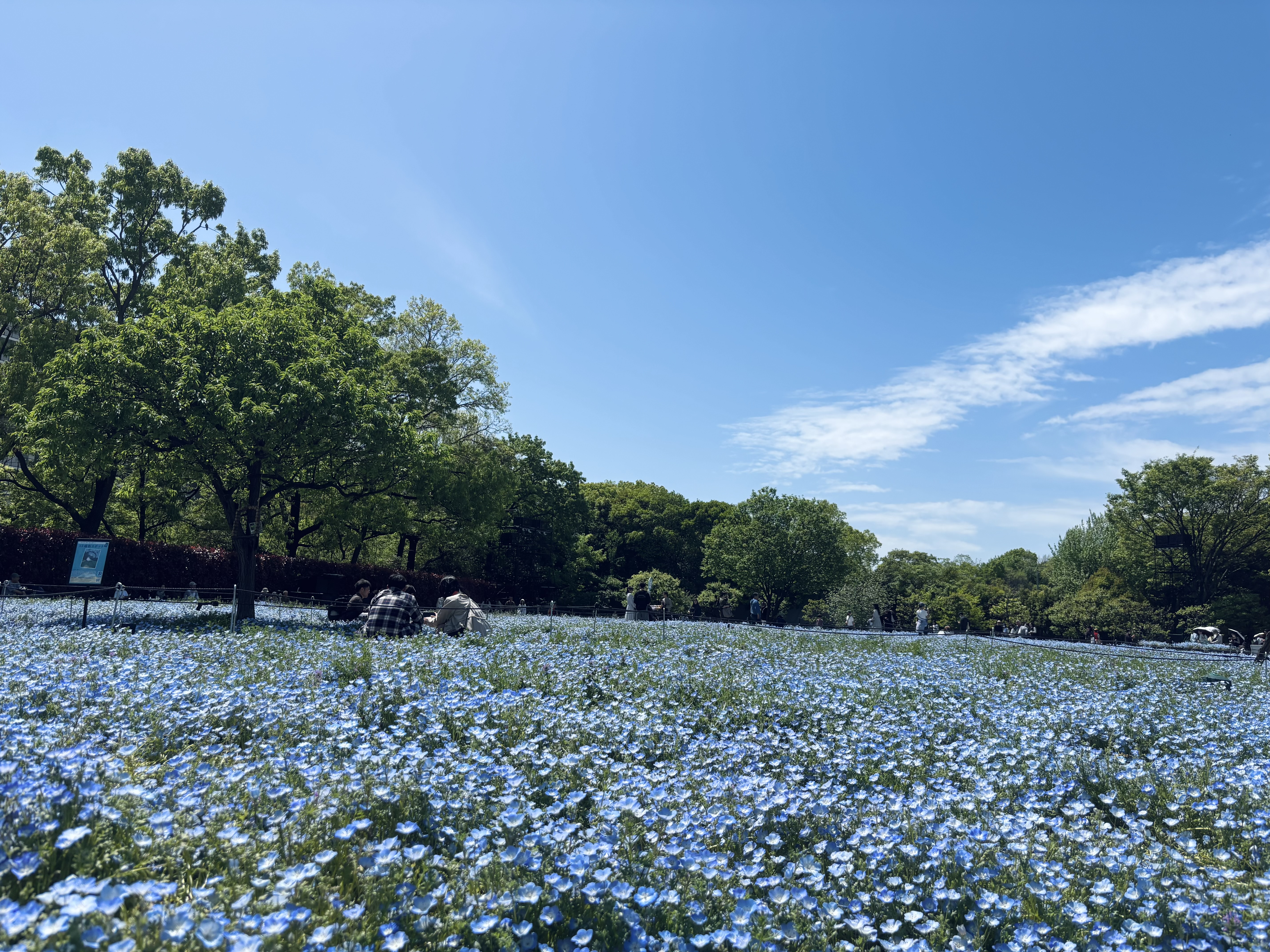
Nagai Botanical Garden in Nagai Park in Higashisumiyoshi Ward, Osaka City

== Establishments ==
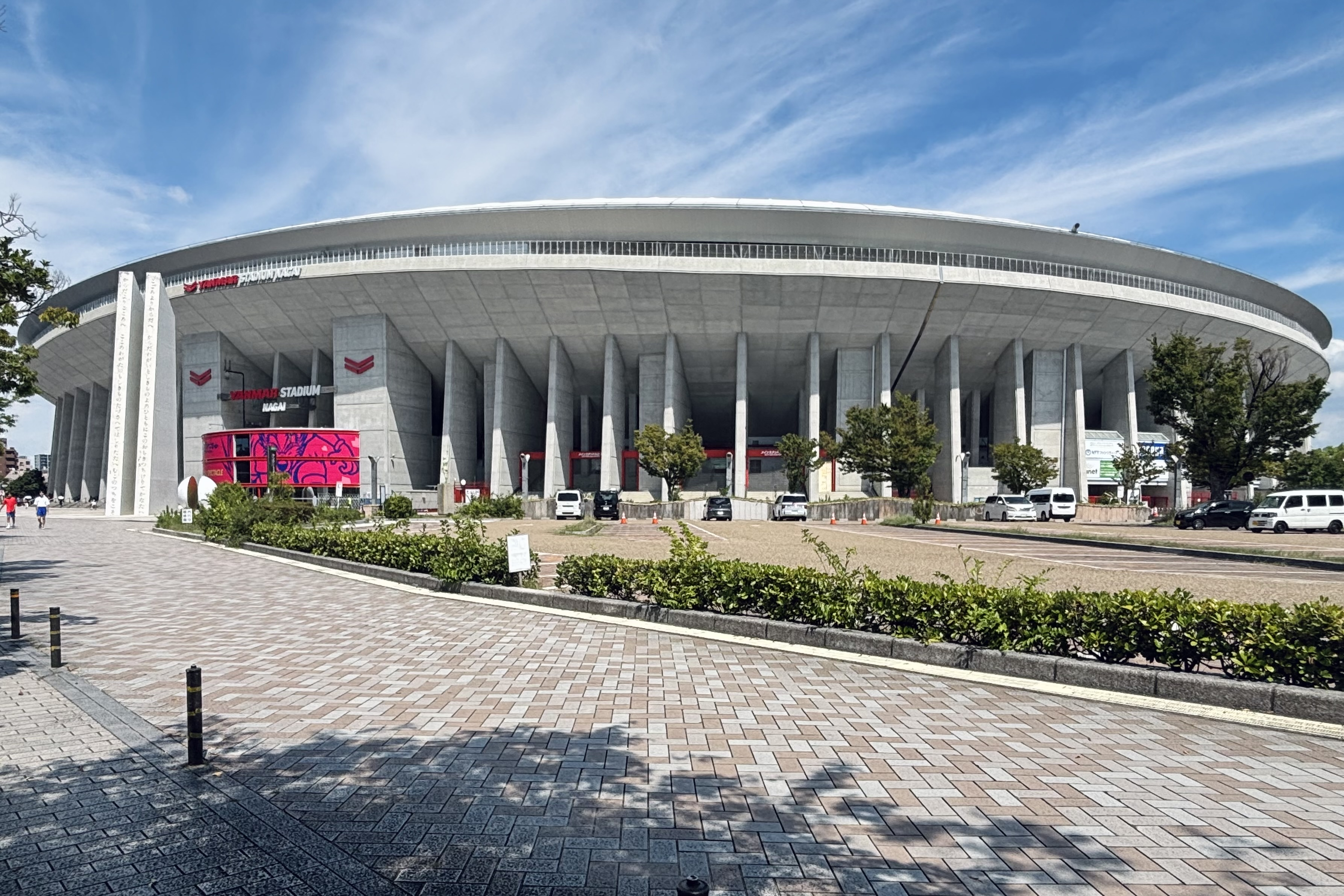
Nagai Stadium

- Nagai Stadium
- Nagai Aid Stadium
- Nagai Ball Gall Field (Kincho Stadium)
- Nagai Tennis Court
- Nagai Sumo Stadium
- Nagai Hostel
- Nagai Botanical Garden
- Osaka Museum of Natural History
- Disabled Sports Center
- Rubber baseball Stadium

=== Defunct establishments ===
- Osaka Central Keirin Stadium
- Osaka Racecourse

== Access ==
- Tsurugaoka Station (Hanwa Line)
- Nagai Station (Hanwa Line, Osaka Municipal Subway Midosuji Line)
