= Abiko Station (Osaka) =

Metro station in Osaka, Japan

Abiko Station あびこ
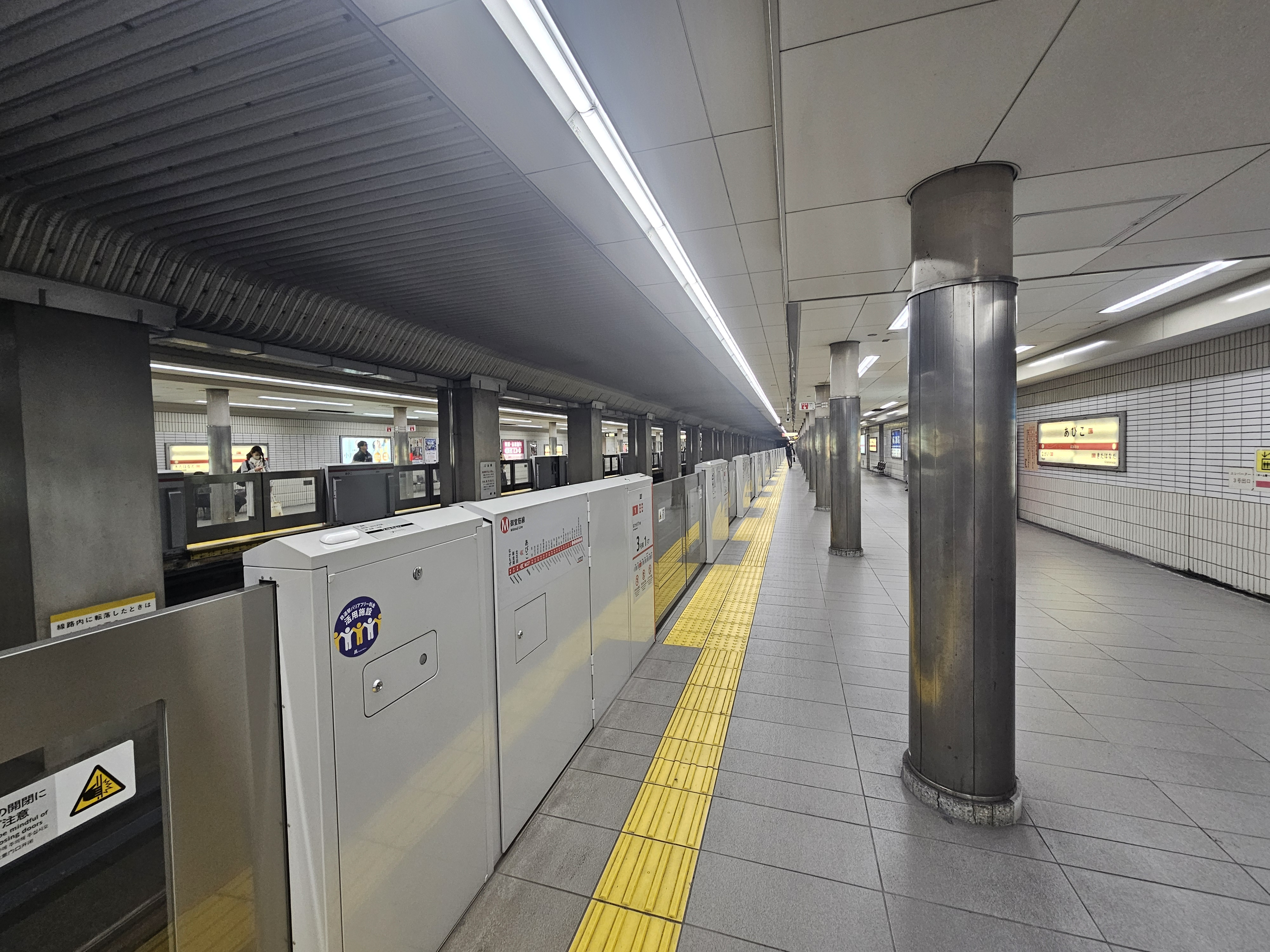
- Station platform

General information
- Location: 7-12-21 Karita, Sumiyoshi, Osaka, Osaka Prefecture; Japan
- Coordinates: 34°35′57″N 135°30′46″E
- System: Osaka Metro
- Operator: Osaka Metro
- Line: Midōsuji Line
- Platforms: 2 side platforms
- Tracks: 2

Construction
- Structure type: Underground
- Accessible: yes

Other information
- Station code: M 27
- Website: Official website

History
- Opened: 1 July 1960; 66 years ago

Services
Preceding station	Osaka Metro	Following station
Nagai M 26 towards Esaka	Midōsuji Line	Kitahanada M 28 towards Nakamozu
Location
- Location within Osaka Prefecture Location within Japan

Abiko Station (我孫子駅 あびこ駅, Abiko-eki; M27) is a train station on the Osaka Metro Midosuji Line in Sumiyoshi-ku, Osaka, Japan. Abiko is situated on the southern city limits, with the Yamato River separating it from Sakai city. Abiko Station is the nearest stop for Osaka City University. The station name is written in hiragana since 我孫子 is difficult to read in kanji.

== Station layout ==
There are ticket gates and two side platforms with two tracks on the first basement level.

1	■ Midosuji Line	for Nakamozu
2	■ Midosuji Line	for Tennoji, Namba, Umeda and Minoh-kayano

== History ==
Abiko Depot was formerly situated after Abiko Station, but it was closed in 1987 after the line was extended southward to Nakamozu and a new depot at Nakamozu opened at the same time.
