= Nagai Stadium =

Building in Higashisumiyoshi-ku, Osaka Prefecture, Japan

Nagai Stadium Yanmar Stadium Nagai
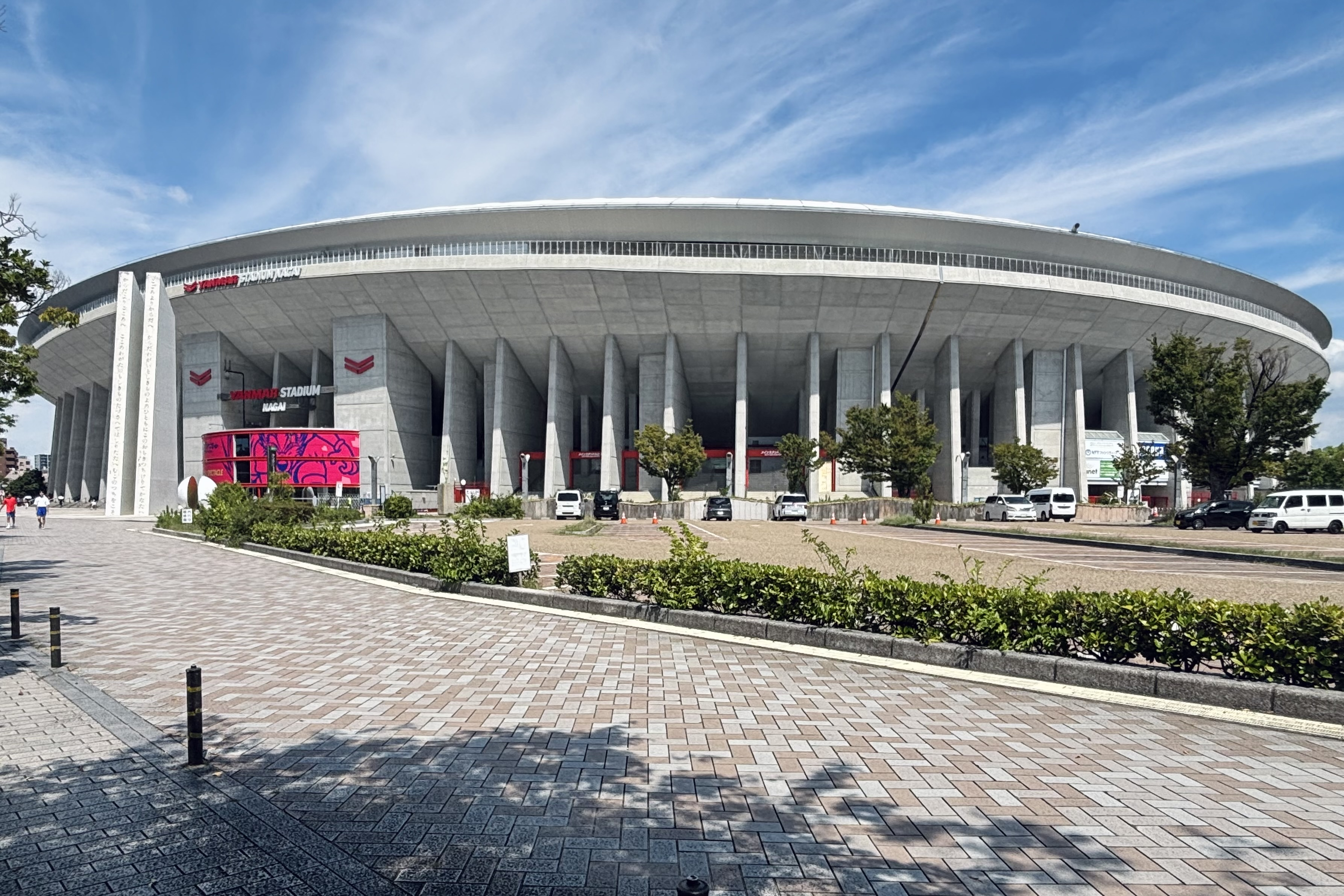
- Interactive map of Nagai Stadium; Yanmar Stadium Nagai
- Former names: Osaka Nagai Stadium (1964–2014)
- Location: Nagai Park, Higashisumiyoshi-ku, Osaka, Japan
- Coordinates: 34°36′50.83″N 135°31′6.42″E
- Owner: Osaka City
- Operator: Waku Waku Park Project Team
- Capacity: 47,853
- Surface: Grass
- Scoreboard: Yes
- Field size: 105 by 68 metres (115 by 74 yards)
- Public transit: JR West: R Hanwa Line at Nagai; Osaka Metro: Midosuji Line at Nagai

Construction
- Opened: 1964
- Renovated: 2007
- Expanded: 1996

Tenants
- Cerezo Osaka (1996–present); NTT DoCoMo Red Hurricanes Osaka

Website
- About Nagai Stadium (in Japanese)

Nagai Stadium (大阪市 長居陸上競技場, Ōsaka-shi Nagai Rikujō Kyōgijō), a.k.a. the Yanmar Stadium Nagai (ヤンマースタジアム長居, Yanmā Sutajiamu Nagai) for sponsorship reasons, is a stadium in Osaka, Japan. It is the home ground of J. League club Cerezo Osaka. The stadium has a seating capacity of 47,853. The rugby union club NTT DoCoMo Red Hurricanes Osaka use the venue for most of their home games.

== History ==
When Nagai Stadium initially opened in 1964, its capacity was 23,000, and its opening event was a football match during the 1964 Summer Olympics. The stadium's seating capacity was expanded to 50,000 in 1996 for the 52nd National Sports Festival of Japan in 1997.

The stadium hosted three matches in the 2002 FIFA World Cup.

Date	Team #1	Res.	Team #2	Round	Attendance
12 June 2002	Nigeria	0–0	England	Group F	44,864
14 June 2002	Tunisia	0–2	Japan	Group H	45,213
22 June 2002	Senegal	0–1 (asdet)	Turkey	Quarter-finals	44,233

Nagai Stadium has been used many times for athletic competitions; it played host to the Athletics at the 2001 East Asian Games and the 2007 World Championships in Athletics. It is also the venue for the annual Osaka Grand Prix athletics meeting which took place every May from 1996 to 2010, and again since 2018. In addition, the stadium is the starting and finishing point for the Osaka International Ladies Marathon, held annually in late January-early February.

Other than sports event, this venue also used as concert venue. In 2018 Nogizaka46 held a two days concert for their Summer Tour. K-Pop girl group TWICE played at the stadium on May 13th and 14th 2023 as part of their Ready to Be World Tour, and will return to play encore dates on July 13th and 14th 2024.

== Access ==
=== Rail transit ===
- It takes 3 minutes on foot from Tsurugaoka Station on JR-West Hanwa Line.
- It takes 5 minutes on foot from Nagai Station on JR-West Hanwa Line and Osaka Municipal Subway Midōsuji Line.
- It takes 20 minutes on foot from Harinakano Station on Kintetsu Minami Osaka Line.

=== Osaka City Bus ===
Subway Nagai
- Route 4: Subway Suminoekoen – Subway Nagai – Deto Bus Terminal
- Route 24: Sumiyoshi Shako-mae – Subway Nagai – Minami-Nagai
- Route 40: Sumiyoshi Shako-mae – Subway Nagai – Deto Bus Terminal

Nagaikoen-kitaguchi
- Route 54A: Sumiyoshi Shako-mae → Subway Abiko → Takaai Danchi-mae → Nagaikoen-kitaguchi → Subway Nishitanabe → Furitsu Sogo-iryo-center (General Medical Center) → Sumiyoshi Shako-mae
- Route 54B: Sumiyoshi Shako-mae → Furitsu Sogo-iryo-center (General Medical Center) → Subway Nishitanabe → Nagaikoen-kitaguchi → Takaai Danchi-mae → Subway Abiko → Sumiyoshi Shako-mae

== See also ==
- Nagai Aid Stadium
- Nagai Ball Gall Field

Preceded by Busan Gudeok Stadium; Busan	East Asian Games Football tournament Final Venue; 2001	Succeeded by Estádio Campo Desportivo; Macau
Preceded by Busan Gudeok Stadium; Busan	East Asian Games Athletics competitions Main Venue; 2001	Succeeded by Estádio Campo Desportivo; Macau
Preceded by Koshien Stadium	Site of the Koshien Bowl; 2007, 2008	Succeeded by Koshien Stadium
