= Yanmar Field Nagai =

Stadium in Higashisumiyoshi-ku, Osaka Prefecture, Japan

Coordinates: 34.611352°N 135.518641°E

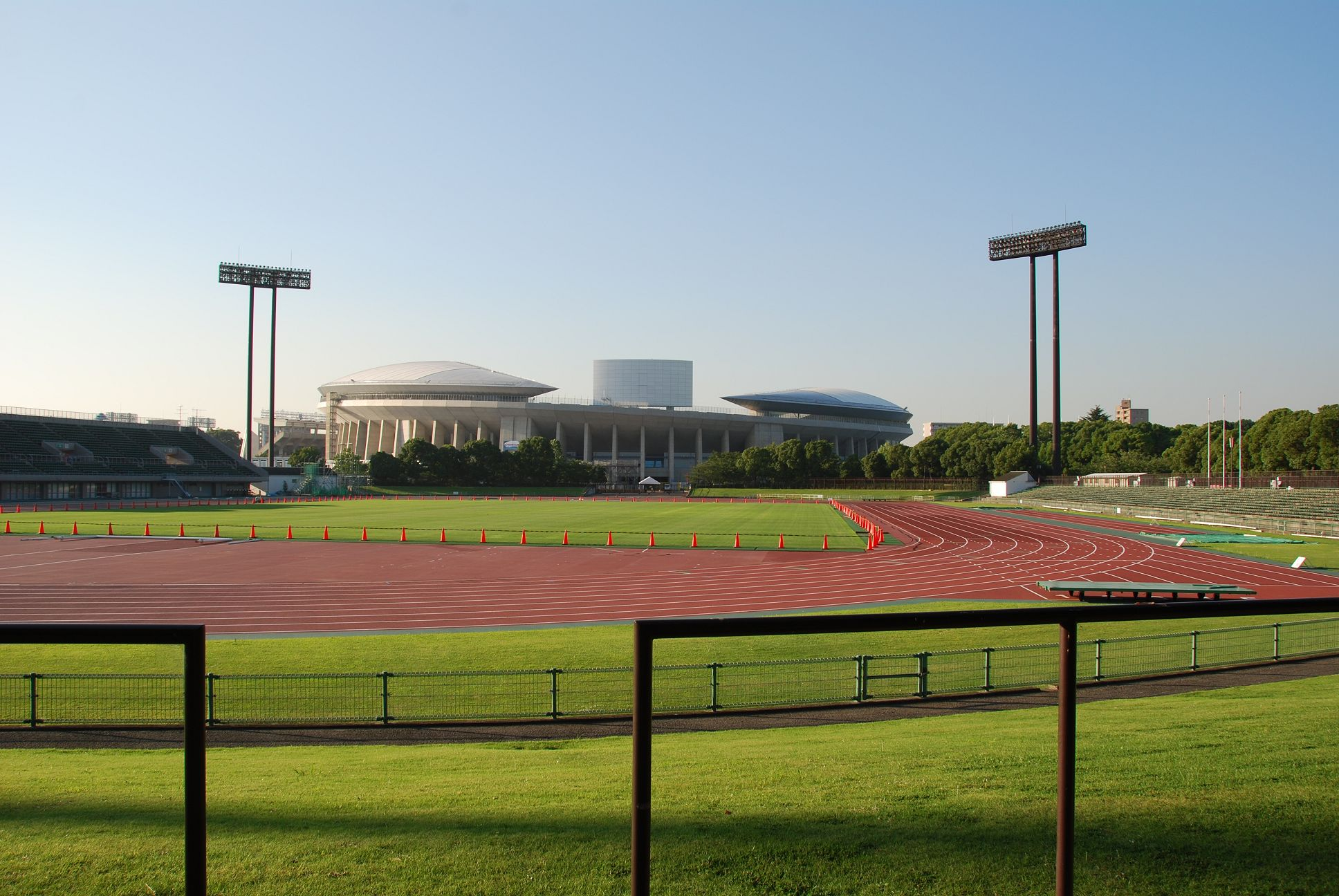
- Interactive map of Yanmar Field Nagai
- Former names: Osaka Nagai Second Stadium (1993–2014)
- Location: Higashisumiyoshi-ku Osaka, Japan
- Owner: Osaka City
- Capacity: 15,516
- Surface: Grass
- Field size: 106 x 69 m

Construction
- Opened: 1993

Tenants
- Osaka International Ladies Marathon (1994–1996, 2023, start and finish); Sagawa Express Osaka (2002–2006); Cerezo Osaka (2006–2007); FC Osaka (2015–2018)

The Yanmar Field Nagai (ヤンマーフィールド長居) is an athletics stadium, also used as the support stadium for the Yanmar Stadium Nagai in Nagai Park, Higashisumiyoshi-ku, Osaka, Japan. The Aid Stadium, occasionally called The Second Nagai Stadium allows the bigger stadium to host world class athletic events. It seats 15,000 with overflow room on a grass hill.

It was formerly known as Osaka Nagai Second Stadium. Since March 2014 it has been called Yanmar Field Nagai for the naming rights.

The Aid Stadium is home to Sagawa Express Osaka SC and occasionally Cerezo Osaka from 2006 to 2007.

== See also ==
- Nagai Stadium
- Nagai Ball Gall Field
