= Kazuaki Tasaka =

Japanese footballer and manager

Kazuaki Tasaka 田坂 和昭
Personal information
- Full name: Kazuaki Tasaka
- Date of birth: August 3, 1971 (age 55)
- Place of birth: Hiroshima, Hiroshima, Japan
- Height: 1.73 m (5 ft 8 in)
- Position: Midfielder

Team information
- Current team: Iwaki FC (manager)

Youth career
- 1987–1989: Tokai University Daiichi High School

College career
| Years | Team | Apps | (Gls) |
| 1990–1993 | Tokai University | | |

Senior career*
| Years | Team | Apps | (Gls) |
| 1994–1998 | Bellmare Hiratsuka | 176 | (3) |
| 1999 | Shimizu S-Pulse | 13 | (2) |
| 2000–2002 | Cerezo Osaka | 76 | (4) |
| Total | | 265 | (9) |

International career
| 1995–1999 | Japan | 7 | (0) |

Managerial career
- 2011–2015: Oita Trinita
- 2015: Shimizu S-Pulse
- 2017–2018: Fukushima United FC
- 2019–2021: Tochigi SC
- 2023: Giravanz Kitakyushu
- 2026-: Iwaki FC
Medal record
Bellmare Hiratsuka
| Winner | Emperor's Cup | 1994 |
Shimizu S-Pulse
| Runner-up | J1 League | 1999 |
Cerezo Osaka
| Runner-up | Emperor's Cup | 2001 |
- * Club domestic league appearances and goals

Kazuaki Tasaka (田坂 和昭, Tasaka Kazuaki; born August 3, 1971) is a former Japanese football player and manager. He last played for Japan national team until 1999. He is the manager of Iwaki FC from september 2026.

== Club career ==
Tasaka was born in Hiroshima on August 3, 1971. He was educated at and played for Tokai University Daiichi High School and Tokai University. After graduating, he joined newly promoted J1 League side Bellmare Hiratsuka. He was immediately installed as a regular and received the J1 League Young Player of the Year award that year. Due to club's financial problem, he was released along with Nobuyuki Kojima, Wagner Lopes, Hong Myung-bo and Yoshihiro Natsuka at the end of the 1998 season. He moved to Shimizu S-Pulse (1999) and then to Cerezo Osaka (2000–2002) where he finished his playing career.

== International career ==
Tasaka was capped 7 times for the Japan national team between 1995 and 1999. His first international appearance came on May 28, 1995 in a friendly against Ecuador at Tokyo National Stadium. In March 1999, he was selected Japan for the first time in 4 years by Philippe Troussier. He also played at 1999 Copa América.

== Managerial career ==
Tasaka worked as a coach at Cerezo Osaka's youth setup from 2003. He was promoted to an assistant coach of the club's top team in the middle of the 2004 season and helped them to stay up at J1 League. He was offered a contract extension but he declined it to prepare for acquiring the S-Class Coaching License, a prerequisite to manage a J.League club, and study coaching skills abroad. He attained the S-Class License in 2005. He became a coach at Shimizu S-Pulse's satellite team in 2006, and was promoted to an assistant coach of club's top team in 2007.

In 2011, Tasaka moved to J2 League club Oita Trinita. In 2012, the club won the promotion playoff and was promoted to J1 for the first time in 4 years. Although he managed in J1 first time in his career, Trinita results were bad and returned to J2 in 1 year. Although Tasaka managed until 2015 season, he was sacked in June 2015 when the club was at the bottom place of 22 clubs in J2.

In July 2015, Tasaka returned to J1 club Shimizu S-Pulse and became an assistant coach under manager Katsumi Oenoki. However the club results were bad and Oenoki resigned in August when the club was at the 17th place of 18 clubs. Tasaka became a new manager as Oenoki successor. However the club performance did not improve and S-Pulse was relegated to J2 first time in the club history. Tasaka also resigned end of the season.

In 2016, Tasaka signed with J2 club Matsumoto Yamaga FC and became a coach under manager Yasuharu Sorimachi.

In 2017, Tasaka moved to J3 League club Fukushima United FC and became a manager. He managed the club in 2 seasons. In 2019, Tasaka signed with J2 club Tochigi SC until 2021 after resignation contract.

In 8 December 2022, Tasaka signed with J3 club Giravanz Kitakyushu for upcoming 2023 season after Kenichi Amano expiration contract in 2022 season.

== Career statistics ==
=== Club ===
| Club performance | | | League | | Cup | | League Cup | | Total | |
| Season | Club | League | Apps | Goals | Apps | Goals | Apps | Goals | Apps | Goals |
| Japan | | | League | | Emperor's Cup | | J.League Cup | | Total | |
|---|---|---|---|---|---|---|---|---|---|---|
| 1994 | Bellmare Hiratsuka | J1 League | 35 | 0 | 5 | 1 | 1 | 0 | 41 | 1 |
| 1995 | Bellmare Hiratsuka | J1 League | 47 | 1 | 0 | 0 | - | | 47 | 1 |
| 1996 | Bellmare Hiratsuka | J1 League | 30 | 0 | 3 | 0 | 15 | 0 | 48 | 0 |
| 1997 | Bellmare Hiratsuka | J1 League | 31 | 2 | 3 | 0 | 5 | 0 | 39 | 2 |
| 1998 | Bellmare Hiratsuka | J1 League | 33 | 0 | 2 | 0 | 3 | 0 | 38 | 0 |
| 1998 | Total | | 176 | 3 | 13 | 1 | 24 | 0 | 213 | 4 |
| 1999 | Shimizu S-Pulse | J1 League | 13 | 2 | 0 | 0 | 2 | 0 | 15 | 2 |
| 1999 | Total | | 13 | 2 | 0 | 0 | 2 | 0 | 15 | 2 |
| 2000 | Cerezo Osaka | J1 League | 30 | 1 | 3 | 0 | 4 | 0 | 37 | 1 |
| 2001 | Cerezo Osaka | J1 League | 29 | 1 | 4 | 0 | 2 | 0 | 35 | 1 |
| 2002 | Cerezo Osaka | J2 League | 17 | 2 | 1 | 0 | - | | 18 | 2 |
| 2002 | Total | | 76 | 4 | 8 | 0 | 6 | 0 | 90 | 4 |
| Career Total | | | 265 | 9 | 21 | 1 | 32 | 0 | 318 | 10 |

=== International ===
Japan national team
| Year | Apps | Goals |
|---|---|---|
| 1995 | 4 | 0 |
| 1996 | 0 | 0 |
| 1997 | 0 | 0 |
| 1998 | 0 | 0 |
| 1999 | 3 | 0 |
| Total | 7 | 0 |

== Managerial statistics ==
Update; 18 October 2026

| Team | From | To | Record | | | | |
| Team | From | To | G | W | D | L | Win % |
|---|---|---|---|---|---|---|---|
| Oita Trinita | 2011 | 2015 | 178 | 55 | 50 | 73 | 30.90 |
| Shimizu S-Pulse | 2015 | 2015 | 12 | 1 | 4 | 7 | 8.33 |
| Fukushima United FC | 2017 | 2018 | 64 | 22 | 17 | 25 | 34.38 |
| Tochigi SC | 2019 | 2021 | 130 | 35 | 44 | 51 | 26.92 |
| Giravanz Kitakyushu | 2023 | 2023 | 27 | 5 | 8 | 14 | 18.52 |
| Iwaki FC | 2026 | act | 7 | 4 | 0 | 3 | 57.14 |
| Total | | | 418 | 122 | 123 | 173 | 29.19 |

== Honours and awards ==
=== Individual honours ===
- J.League Rookie of the Year - 1994
