= 1997 Bellmare Hiratsuka season =

Bellmare Hiratsuka
1997 season
- Manager: Shigeharu Ueki
- Stadium: Hiratsuka Athletics Stadium
- J.League: 8th
- Emperor's Cup: Quarterfinals
- J.League Cup: GL-A 3rd
- Top goalscorer: Wagner Lopes (18)
Home colours	Away colours

1997 Bellmare Hiratsuka season

== Competitions ==
Competitions	Position
J.League	8th / 17 clubs
Emperor's Cup	Quarterfinals
J.League Cup	GL-A 3rd / 4 clubs

== Domestic results ==
=== J.League ===
12 April 1997 1-1	Gamba Osaka	4-1	Bellmare Hiratsuka	Osaka Expo '70 Stadium
JST (UTC+09)

16 April 1997 1-2	Bellmare Hiratsuka	0-2	Verdy Kawasaki	Hiratsuka Athletics Stadium
JST (UTC+09)

19 April 1997 1-3	Kyoto Purple Sanga	0-2	Bellmare Hiratsuka	Nishikyogoku Athletic Stadium
JST (UTC+09)

23 April 1997 1-4	Bellmare Hiratsuka	1-0	JEF United Ichihara	Hiratsuka Athletics Stadium
JST (UTC+09)

1-5	bye

3 May 1997 1-6	Yokohama Marinos	2-4	Bellmare Hiratsuka	Yokohama Mitsuzawa Stadium
JST (UTC+09)

7 May 1997 1-7	Bellmare Hiratsuka	1-2	Shimizu S-Pulse	Tokyo National Stadium
JST (UTC+09)

10 May 1997 1-8	Sanfrecce Hiroshima	0-1 (GG) (a.e.t.)	Bellmare Hiratsuka	Hiroshima Big Arch
JST (UTC+09)

17 May 1997 1-9	Bellmare Hiratsuka	2-1	Avispa Fukuoka	Hiratsuka Athletics Stadium
JST (UTC+09)

24 May 1997 1-10	Cerezo Osaka	0-2	Bellmare Hiratsuka	Technoport Fukui Stadium
JST (UTC+09)

28 May 1997 1-11	Bellmare Hiratsuka	3-0	Vissel Kobe	Hiratsuka Athletics Stadium
JST (UTC+09)

31 May 1997 1-12	Kashima Antlers	2-1	Bellmare Hiratsuka	Kashima Soccer Stadium
JST (UTC+09)

5 July 1997 1-13	Bellmare Hiratsuka	1-0	Nagoya Grampus Eight	Hiratsuka Athletics Stadium
JST (UTC+09)

9 July 1997 1-14	Yokohama Flügels	2-1	Bellmare Hiratsuka	Yokohama Mitsuzawa Stadium
JST (UTC+09)

12 July 1997 1-15	Bellmare Hiratsuka	2-1 (GG) (a.e.t.)	Júbilo Iwata	Hiratsuka Athletics Stadium
JST (UTC+09)

16 July 1997 1-16	Kashiwa Reysol	2-0	Bellmare Hiratsuka	Hitachi Kashiwa Soccer Stadium
JST (UTC+09)

19 July 1997 1-17	Bellmare Hiratsuka	3-2	Urawa Red Diamonds	Hiratsuka Athletics Stadium
JST (UTC+09)

30 July 1997 2-1	Bellmare Hiratsuka	7-4	Kashiwa Reysol	Hiratsuka Athletics Stadium
JST (UTC+09)

2 August 1997 2-2	Bellmare Hiratsuka	3-4	Gamba Osaka	Hiratsuka Athletics Stadium
JST (UTC+09)

6 August 1997 2-3	Verdy Kawasaki	1-2	Bellmare Hiratsuka	Todoroki Athletics Stadium
JST (UTC+09)

9 August 1997 2-4	Bellmare Hiratsuka	2-1	Kyoto Purple Sanga	Hiratsuka Athletics Stadium
JST (UTC+09)

16 August 1997 2-5	JEF United Ichihara	0-0 (GG) (a.e.t.) (5-6 p)	Bellmare Hiratsuka	Ichihara Seaside Stadium
JST (UTC+09)

2-6	bye

23 August 1997 2-7	Bellmare Hiratsuka	1-3	Yokohama Marinos	Hiratsuka Athletics Stadium
JST (UTC+09)

30 August 1997 2-8	Shimizu S-Pulse	3-1	Bellmare Hiratsuka	Nihondaira Sports Stadium
JST (UTC+09)

3 September 1997 2-9	Bellmare Hiratsuka	2-0	Sanfrecce Hiroshima	Hiratsuka Athletics Stadium
JST (UTC+09)

6 September 1997 2-10	Avispa Fukuoka	1-2	Bellmare Hiratsuka	Hakatanomori Football Stadium
JST (UTC+09)

10 September 1997 2-11	Júbilo Iwata	3-1	Bellmare Hiratsuka	Júbilo Iwata Stadium
JST (UTC+09)

13 September 1997 2-12	Bellmare Hiratsuka	5-4 (GG) (a.e.t.)	Cerezo Osaka	Hiratsuka Athletics Stadium
JST (UTC+09)

20 September 1997 2-13	Bellmare Hiratsuka	2-5	Kashima Antlers	Hiratsuka Athletics Stadium
JST (UTC+09)

24 September 1997 2-14	Vissel Kobe	0-1	Bellmare Hiratsuka	Kobe Universiade Memorial Stadium
JST (UTC+09)

27 September 1997 2-15	Nagoya Grampus Eight	2-1	Bellmare Hiratsuka	Gifu Nagaragawa Stadium
JST (UTC+09)

1 October 1997 2-16	Bellmare Hiratsuka	0-0 (GG) (a.e.t.) (4-5 p)	Yokohama Flügels	Hiratsuka Athletics Stadium
JST (UTC+09)

4 October 1997 2-17	Urawa Red Diamonds	1-0 (GG) (a.e.t.)	Bellmare Hiratsuka	Urawa Komaba Stadium
JST (UTC+09)

=== Emperor's Cup ===
1st Round	bye

2nd Round	bye

14 December 1997 3rd Round	Bellmare Hiratsuka	7-0	Jatco	Hiratsuka Athletics Stadium
JST (UTC+09)

20 December 1997 4th Round	Kyoto Purple Sanga	1-5	Bellmare Hiratsuka	Kagawa Marugame Stadium
JST (UTC+09)

23 December 1997 Quarterfinals	Tokyo Gas	3-2 (GG) (a.e.t.)	Bellmare Hiratsuka	Mizuho Athletic Stadium
JST (UTC+09)

=== J.League Cup ===
8 March 1997 GL-A-1	Shimizu S-Pulse	0-1	Bellmare Hiratsuka	Nihondaira Sports Stadium
JST (UTC+09)

15 March 1997 GL-A-2	Bellmare Hiratsuka	1-2	JEF United Ichihara	Hiratsuka Athletics Stadium
JST (UTC+09)

19 March 1997 GL-A-3	Bellmare Hiratsuka	6-0	Brummell Sendai	Hiratsuka Athletics Stadium
JST (UTC+09)

22 March 1997 GL-A-4	JEF United Ichihara	3-1	Bellmare Hiratsuka	Ichihara Seaside Stadium
JST (UTC+09)

26 March 1997 GL-A-5	Brummell Sendai	3-4	Bellmare Hiratsuka	Miyagi Athletic Stadium
JST (UTC+09)

29 March 1997 GL-A-6	Bellmare Hiratsuka	2-2	Shimizu S-Pulse	Hiratsuka Athletics Stadium
JST (UTC+09)

== Player statistics ==
No.	Pos.	Nat.	Player	D.o.B. (Age)	Height / Weight	J.League		Emperor's Cup		J.League Cup		Total	
No.	Pos.	Nat.	Player	D.o.B. (Age)	Height / Weight	Apps	Goals	Apps	Goals	Apps	Goals	Apps	Goals
1	GK	(Japan)	Nobuyuki Kojima	January 17, 1966 (aged 31)	187 cm / 85 kg	21	0	3	0	0	0	24	0
2	MF/DF	(Japan)	Hironari Iwamoto	June 27, 1970 (aged 26)	167 cm / 65 kg	8	0	0	0	5	0	13	0
3	MF/DF	(Japan)	Kazuaki Tasaka	August 3, 1971 (aged 25)	173 cm / 68 kg	31	2	3	0	5	0	39	2
4	DF	(Brazil)	Claudio	March 31, 1972 (aged 24)	187 cm / 80 kg	26	6	3	2	6	0	35	8
5	MF	(Brazil)	Simão	October 23, 1968 (aged 28)	182 cm / 70 kg	12	3	0	0	5	0	17	3
6	DF	(Japan)	Hiroaki Kumon	October 20, 1966 (aged 30)	169 cm / 65 kg	32	0	3	1	5	0	40	1
7	MF	(Japan)	Hidetoshi Nakata	January 22, 1977 (aged 20)	175 cm / 72 kg	21	3	3	0	6	1	30	4
8	DF	(Japan)	Yoshihiro Natsuka	October 7, 1969 (aged 27)	182 cm / 72 kg	32	3	3	0	6	0	41	3
9	FW	(Japan)	Koji Seki	June 26, 1972 (aged 24)	176 cm / 70 kg	16	1	3	2	2	0	21	3
10	FW	(Brazil) / (Japan)	Lopes / Wagner Lopes	January 29, 1969 (aged 28)	182 cm / 75 kg	27	18	3	4	6	8	36	30
11	FW	(Japan)	Koji Noguchi	June 5, 1970 (aged 26)	177 cm / 70 kg	12	0	0	0	6	4	18	4
12	MF/DF	(Japan)	Tetsuya Takada	July 31, 1969 (aged 27)	178 cm / 72 kg	28	1	3	0	1	1	32	2
13	DF	(Japan)	Teruo Iwamoto	May 2, 1972 (aged 24)	177 cm / 71 kg	24	4	3	2	6	0	33	6
14	MF	(Japan)	Yasuharu Sorimachi	March 8, 1964 (aged 33)	173 cm / 64 kg	22	4	1	1	1	0	24	5
15	MF	(Japan)	Teppei Nishiyama	February 22, 1975 (aged 22)	176 cm / 70 kg	16	1	2	0	0	0	18	1
16	GK	(Japan)	Makoto Kakegawa	May 23, 1973 (aged 23)	191 cm / 80 kg	9	0	0	0	0	0	9	0
17	MF	(Japan)	Tomoaki Matsukawa	April 18, 1973 (aged 23)	172 cm / 60 kg	23	1	3	0	1	0	27	1
18	MF	(Japan)	Masato Harasaki	August 13, 1974 (aged 22)	178 cm / 70 kg	5	0	0	0	4	0	9	0
19	FW	(Japan)	Daisuke Tonoike	January 29, 1975 (aged 22)	184 cm / 76 kg	9	3	0	0	0	0	9	3
20	MF	(Japan)	Takayasu Kawai	March 7, 1977 (aged 20)	175 cm / 69 kg	1	0	0	0	1	0	2	0
21	GK	(Japan)	Hitoshi Sasaki	July 9, 1973 (aged 23)	179 cm / 74 kg	0	0	0	0	6	0	6	0
22	DF	(Japan)	Hiroshi Miyazawa	November 22, 1970 (aged 26)	183 cm / 80 kg	5	0	0	0	4	0	9	0
23	GK	(Japan)	Akihiro Yoshida	May 28, 1975 (aged 21)	183 cm / 75 kg	2	0	0	0	0	0	2	0
24	FW	(Japan)	Yoshiya Takemura	December 6, 1973 (aged 23)	170 cm / 62 kg	7	0	0	0	0	0	7	0
25	FW	(Japan)	Hiroshi Sakai	October 19, 1976 (aged 20)	179 cm / 71 kg	12	4	1	1	0	0	13	5
26	DF	(Japan)	Takuya Kawaguchi	October 11, 1978 (aged 18)	178 cm / 74 kg	0	0		0	0	0		0
27	DF	(Japan)	Takashi Miki	July 23, 1978 (aged 18)	179 cm / 73 kg	3	0	0	0	0	0	3	0
28	MF	(Japan)	Atsushi Hirano	April 5, 1977 (aged 19)	170 cm / 62 kg	0	0		0	0	0		0
29	DF/MF	(Japan)	Tsuyoshi Kubota	February 28, 1978 (aged 19)	168 cm / 60 kg	0	0		0	0	0		0
30	DF	(Japan)	Kenji Takeichi	June 25, 1977 (aged 19)	178 cm / 68 kg	0	0		0	0	0		0
31	DF	(Japan)	Makoto Kono	July 9, 1978 (aged 18)	176 cm / 65 kg	0	0		0	0	0		0
32	FW	(Japan)	Kozo Minemori	June 12, 1978 (aged 18)	180 cm / 78 kg	0	0		0	0	0		0
33	DF	(Japan)	Yusuke Sasuda	June 6, 1978 (aged 18)	173 cm / 75 kg	0	0		0	0	0		0
34	FW	(Japan)	Yasunori Takada	February 22, 1979 (aged 18)	175 cm / 65 kg	0	0		0	0	0		0
35	MF	(Japan)	Kohei Tojo	June 6, 1978 (aged 18)	173 cm / 65 kg	0	0		0	0	0		0
36	DF	(Japan)	Satoshi Tsunami †	August 14, 1961 (aged 35)	173 cm / 69 kg	6	0	0	0	0	0	6	0
37	DF	(South Korea)	Hong Myung-bo †	February 12, 1969 (aged 28)	-cm / -kg	10	0	3	1	0	0	13	1

- † player(s) joined the team after the opening of this season.

== Transfers ==
In:

No.	Pos.	Nation	Player
4	DF	BRA	Claudio Luiz Assuncao de Freitas (from Palmeiras)
26	DF	JPN	Takuya Kawaguchi (from Sapporo Shiroishi High School)
27	DF	JPN	Takashi Miki (from Takigawa Daini Seinior High School)
29	DF	JPN	Tsuyoshi Kubota (from Bellmare Hiratsuka youth)
31	DF	JPN	Makoto Kono (from Zama Senior High School)
33	DF	JPN	Yusuke Sasuda (from Bellmare Hiratsuka youth)
35	MF	JPN	Kohei Tojo (from Yomiuri S.C. youth)
10	FW	JPN	Wagner Augusto Lopes (from Honda Motor)
19	FW	JPN	Daisuke Tonoike (from Waseda University)
32	FW	JPN	Kozo Minemori (from Tokyo Gakkan Niigata High School)
34	FW	JPN	Yasunori Takada (from Bellmare Hiratsuka youth)

Out:

No.	Pos.	Nation	Player
—	DF	JPN	Fujio Yamamoto (retired)
—	DF	JPN	Akira Narahashi (to Kashima Antlers)
—	DF	BRA	Luis
—	DF	JPN	Masahiro Kuzuno (to Albirex Niigata)
—	MF	BRA	Betinho (to Kawasaki Frontale)
—	MF	JPN	Kazuyuki Takahashi (to Toho Titanium SC)
—	FW	BRA	Paulinho
—	FW	JPN	Tadateru Omoto (retired)
—	FW	BRA	Almir

== Transfers during the season ==
=== In ===
- (Japan) Satoshi Tsunami (from Avispa Fukuoka)
- (South Korea) Hong Myung-bo (from Pohang Steelers on May)

=== Out ===
- (Japan) Koji Noguchi (to Kawasaki Frontale)

== Awards ==
- J.League Best XI: (Japan) Hidetoshi Nakata

== Other pages ==
- (in Japanese) J. League official site
- (in Japanese) Shonan Bellmare official website
