= Koji Noguchi =

Japanese footballer

Koji Noguchi 野口 幸司
Personal information
- Full name: Koji Noguchi
- Date of birth: June 5, 1970 (age 56)
- Place of birth: Chiba, Japan
- Height: 1.77 m (5 ft 9 1/2 in)
- Position: Forward

Youth career
- 199–199: Funabashi High School

Senior career*
Years	Team	Apps	(Gls)
1989–1997	Bellmare Hiratsuka	204	(95)
1997	Kawasaki Frontale	15	(9)
1998–1999	Nagoya Grampus Eight	19	(6)
2000	Omiya Ardija	31	(5)
Total		269	(115)

International career
1995	Japan	1	(0)
Medal record
Bellmare Hiratsuka
Winner	Emperor's Cup	1994
Nagoya Grampus Eight
Winner	Emperor's Cup	1999
- * Club domestic league appearances and goals

Koji Noguchi (野口 幸司, Noguchi Koji; born June 5, 1970) is a former Japanese football player. He played once for the Japan national team.

== Club career ==
Noguchi was born in Chiba Prefecture on June 5, 1970. After graduating from high school, he joined Japan Soccer League club Fujita Industries (later Bellmare Hiratsuka) in 1989. Through Japan Football League, the club was promoted to J1 League in 1994. The club won the champions 1994 Emperor's Cup. In Asia, the club also won 1995 Asian Cup Winners' Cup. Although he played as regular player for long time, his opportunity to play decreased in 1997. In 1997, he moved to Japan Football League club Kawasaki Frontale. Toward end of his career, he played for Nagoya Grampus Eight (1998-1999) and Omiya Ardija (2000). He retired end of 2000 season.

== National team career ==
On August 6, 1995, Noguchi debuted for Japan national team against Costa Rica.

== Club statistics ==
Club performance			League		Cup		League Cup		Total	
Season	Club	League	Apps	Goals	Apps	Goals	Apps	Goals	Apps	Goals
Japan			League		Emperor's Cup		J.League Cup		Total	
1989/90	Fujita Industries	JSL Division 1	1	0					1	0
1990/91	Fujita Industries	JSL Division 2	12	2			0	0	12	2
1991/92	Fujita Industries	JSL Division 2	28	19			3	0	31	19
1992	Fujita Industries	Football League	15	11			-		15	11
1993	Fujita Industries	Football League	18	10	1	0	4	2	23	12
1994	Bellmare Hiratsuka	J1 League	42	19	5	5	1	0	48	24
1995	Bellmare Hiratsuka	J1 League	49	23	0	0	-		49	23
1996	Bellmare Hiratsuka	J1 League	27	11	3	1	10	1	40	13
1997	Bellmare Hiratsuka	J1 League	12	0	0	0	6	4	18	4
1997	Kawasaki Frontale	Football League	15	9	3	1	-		18	10
1998	Nagoya Grampus Eight	J1 League	13	6	2	1	2	1	17	8
1999	Nagoya Grampus Eight	J1 League	6	0	0	0	1	0	7	0
2000	Omiya Ardija	J2 League	31	5	3	1	1	0	35	6
Total			269	115	17	9	28	8	314	132

== National team statistics ==
Japan national team
Year	Apps	Goals
1995	1	0
Total	1	0
