= Teruo Iwamoto =

Japanese footballer

Teruo Iwamoto 岩本 輝雄
Personal information
- Full name: Teruo Iwamoto
- Date of birth: May 2, 1972 (age 54)
- Place of birth: Yokohama, Kanagawa, Japan
- Height: 1.80 m (5 ft 11 in)
- Position: Midfielder

Youth career
- 1988–1990: Yokohama College of Commerce High School

Senior career*
Years	Team	Apps	(Gls)
1991–1997	Bellmare Hiratsuka	142	(25)
1998	Kyoto Purple Sanga	33	(8)
1999	Kawasaki Frontale	12	(5)
2000	Verdy Kawasaki	9	(0)
2001–2003	Vegalta Sendai	82	(14)
2004	Nagoya Grampus Eight	5	(0)
2006	Auckland City	3	(0)
Total		278	(48)

International career
1994	Japan	9	(2)
Medal record
Bellmare Hiratsuka
Winner	Emperor's Cup	1994
- * Club domestic league appearances and goals

Teruo Iwamoto (岩本 輝雄, Iwamoto Teruo; born May 2, 1972) is a former Japanese football player. He played for Japan national team.

== Club career ==
Iwamoto was born in Yokohama on May 2, 1972. After graduating from high school, he joined Fujita Industries (later Bellmare Hiratsuka) in 1991. In 1994, the club won 1994 Emperor's Cup. In Asia, the club also won 1995 Asian Cup Winners' Cup. After that, he could not become regular player due to injuries. In the latter the 1990s, he played for Kyoto Purple Sanga (1998), Kawasaki Frontale (1999) and Verdy Kawasaki (2000). In 2001, he moved to Vegalta Sendai. At the club, he became a regular player and assisted many goals. In 2004, he moved to Nagoya Grampus Eight. However he got hurt in May and he left the club end of the season. In October 2006, he signed with Auckland City and played until December. In December, he also played at 2006 Club World Cup in Japan. He retired after 2006 Club World Cup.

== National team career ==
On May 22, 1994, Iwamoto debuted for Japan national team against Australia. He also played at 1994 Asian Games. At Asian Games, he wore the number 10 shirt for Japan. He played 9 games and scored 2 goals for Japan in 1994.

== Club statistics ==
Club performance			League		Cup		League Cup		Total	
Season	Club	League	Apps	Goals	Apps	Goals	Apps	Goals	Apps	Goals
Japan			League		Emperor's Cup		J.League Cup		Total	
1991/92	Fujita Industries	JSL Division 2	22	7			0	0	22	7
1992	Fujita Industries	Football League	14	2	0	0	-		14	2
1993	Fujita Industries	Football League	10	1	1	0	4	3	15	4
1994	Bellmare Hiratsuka	J1 League	37	6	5	3	1	1	43	10
1995	Bellmare Hiratsuka	J1 League	18	2	1	0	-		19	2
1996	Bellmare Hiratsuka	J1 League	17	3	3	0	9	2	29	5
1997	Bellmare Hiratsuka	J1 League	24	4	3	2	6	0	33	6
1998	Kyoto Purple Sanga	J1 League	33	8	1	0	4	1	38	9
1999	Kawasaki Frontale	J2 League	12	5	0	0	1	0	13	5
2000	Verdy Kawasaki	J1 League	9	0	0	0	2	0	11	0
2001	Vegalta Sendai	J2 League	34	5	3	0	2	1	39	6
2002	Vegalta Sendai	J1 League	22	4	2	0	6	0	30	4
2003	Vegalta Sendai	J1 League	26	5	0	0	4	0	30	5
2004	Nagoya Grampus Eight	J1 League	5	0	0	0	1	0	6	0
New Zealand			League		Chatham Cup		League Cup		Total	
2006/07	Auckland City	Championship	3	0	-		-		3	0
Country	Japan		283	52	19	5	40	8	318	62
Country	New Zealand		3	0	-		-		3	0
Total			286	52	19	5	40	8	321	62

== National team statistics ==
Japan national team
Year	Apps	Goals
1994	9	2
Total	9	2
