= Hiroaki Kumon =

Japanese footballer (born 1966)

Hiroaki Kumon 公文 裕明
Personal information
- Full name: Hiroaki Kumon
- Date of birth: October 20, 1966 (age 60)
- Place of birth: Kanagawa, Japan
- Height: 1.69 m (5 ft 6 1/2 in)
- Position: Defender

Youth career
- 1982–1984: Kamakura High School
- 1985–1988: Aoyama Gakuin University

Senior career*
Years	Team	Apps	(Gls)
1989–1992	Furukawa Electric	20	(0)
1992–1998	Bellmare Hiratsuka	140	(2)
1999–2002	Yokohama FC	84	(0)
Total		244	(2)
Medal record
Furukawa Electric
Runner-up	JSL Cup	1990
Bellmare Hiratsuka
Winner	Emperor's Cup	1994
- * Club domestic league appearances and goals

Hiroaki Kumon (公文 裕明, Kumon Hiroaki; born October 20, 1966) is a former Japanese football player.

== Playing career ==
Kumon was born in Kanagawa Prefecture on October 20, 1966. After graduating from Aoyama Gakuin University, he joined Japan Soccer League club Furukawa Electric in 1989. He played as left side back from first season. In 1992, he moved to Japan Football League club Fujita Industries based in his local. The club won the champions in 1993 and was promoted to J1 League from 1994. From 1994, he played many matches and the club won the champions 1994 Emperor's Cup and 1995 Asian Cup Winners' Cup. Although he played as regular player, he was released end of 1998 season due to their financial problems. In 1999, he moved to new club Yokohama FC in Japan Football League. The club won the champions for 2 years in a row (1999-2000) and was promoted to J2 League. He retired end of 2002 season.

== Club statistics ==
Club performance			League		Cup		League Cup		Total	
Season	Club	League	Apps	Goals	Apps	Goals	Apps	Goals	Apps	Goals
Japan			League		Emperor's Cup		J.League Cup		Total	
1989/90	Furukawa Electric	JSL Division 1	6	0			2	0	8	0
1990/91	Furukawa Electric	JSL Division 1	5	0			3	0	8	0
1991/92	Furukawa Electric	JSL Division 1	9	0			1	0	10	0
1992	Fujita Industries	Football League	10	0			-		10	0
1993	Fujita Industries	Football League	10	1	1	0	5	0	16	1
1994	Bellmare Hiratsuka	J1 League	28	1	5	0	0	0	33	1
1995	Bellmare Hiratsuka	J1 League	27	0	2	0	-		29	0
1996	Bellmare Hiratsuka	J1 League	10	0	1	0	14	0	25	0
1997	Bellmare Hiratsuka	J1 League	32	0	3	1	5	0	40	1
1998	Bellmare Hiratsuka	J1 League	23	0	2	0	1	0	26	0
1999	Yokohama FC	Football League	19	0	2	0	-		21	0
2000	Yokohama FC	Football League	18	0	2	0	-		20	0
2001	Yokohama FC	J2 League	26	0	0	0	3	0	29	0
2002	Yokohama FC	J2 League	21	0	2	0	-		23	0
Total			244	2	20	1	34	0	298	3
