= Yoshihiro Natsuka =

Japanese footballer

Yoshihiro Natsuka 名塚 善寛
Personal information
- Full name: Yoshihiro Natsuka
- Date of birth: October 7, 1969 (age 57)
- Place of birth: Funabashi, Chiba, Japan
- Height: 1.82 m (6 ft 0 in)
- Position: Defender

Youth career
- 1985–1987: Narashino High School

Senior career*
Years	Team	Apps	(Gls)
1988–1998	Bellmare Hiratsuka	259	(14)
1999–2001	Consadole Sapporo	79	(6)
Total		338	(20)

International career
1994–1995	Japan	11	(1)

Managerial career
- 2021-2023: Renofa Yamaguchi FC
Medal record
Bellmare Hiratsuka
Winner	Emperor's Cup	1994
Runner-up	Emperor's Cup	1988
- * Club domestic league appearances and goals

Yoshihiro Natsuka (名塚 善寛, Natsuka Yoshihiro) is a Japanese football manager and former player.

Natsuka was born in Funabashi on October 7, 1969. After graduating from high school, he joined Fujita Industries (later Bellmare Hiratsuka) in 1988. In 1994, the club won the Emperor's Cup and he was selected for the Best Eleven. In Asia, the club also won the 1995 Asian Cup Winners' Cup. However, he left the club at the end of the 1998 season due to financial constraints. In 1999, he moved to J2 League club Consadole Sapporo. The club won the championship in 2000 and was promoted to the J1 League. He retired in 2001.

== National team career ==
On May 22, 1994, Natsuka debuted for Japan national team against Australia. In 1994, he played full time in all matches included 1994 Asian Games. In 1995, he also played at 1995 King Fahd Cup. He played 11 games and scored 1 goal for Japan until 1995.

== Club statistics ==
Club performance			League		Cup		League Cup		Total	
Season	Club	League	Apps	Goals	Apps	Goals	Apps	Goals	Apps	Goals
Japan			League		Emperor's Cup		J.League Cup		Total	
1988/89	Fujita Industries	JSL Division 1	10	0					10	0
1989/90	Fujita Industries	JSL Division 1	8	0					8	0
1990/91	Fujita Industries	JSL Division 1	22	2			1	0	23	2
1991/92	Fujita Industries	JSL Division 1	24	3			3	0	27	3
1992	Fujita Industries	Football League	18	2			-		18	2
1993	Fujita Industries	Football League	18	2	1	0	6	0	25	2
1994	Bellmare Hiratsuka	J1 League	41	1	5	0	1	0	47	1
1995	Bellmare Hiratsuka	J1 League	45	1	2	1	-		47	2
1996	Bellmare Hiratsuka	J1 League	14	0	0	0	13	2	27	2
1997	Bellmare Hiratsuka	J1 League	32	3	3	0	6	0	41	3
1998	Bellmare Hiratsuka	J1 League	27	0	2	0	2	0	31	0
1999	Consadole Sapporo	J2 League	32	3	0	0	2	0	34	3
2000	Consadole Sapporo	J2 League	29	3	2	0	1	0	32	3
2001	Consadole Sapporo	J1 League	18	0	1	0	1	0	20	0
Total			338	20	16	1	36	2	390	23

== National team statistics ==
Japan national team
Year	Apps	Goals
1994	9	1
1995	2	0
Total	11	1

== International goals ==
#	Date	Venue	Opponent	Score	Result	Competition
1.	July 8, 1994	Mizuho Athletic Stadium, Nagoya, Japan	Ghana	3-2	Won	Friendly

== Awards ==
- J.League Best XI - 1994
