= 1994 Bellmare Hiratsuka season =

Bellmare Hiratsuka
1994 season
- Manager: Mitsuru Komaeda
- Stadium: Hiratsuka Stadium
- J.League: 5th
- Emperor's Cup: Champions (→Asian Cup Winners' Cup)
- J.League Cup: 1st Round
- Top goalscorer: League: Betinho (24); All: Betinho (27)
- Highest home attendance: 16,131 (vs Yokohama Marinos, 16 March 1994); 48,640 (vs Nagoya Grampus Eight, 2 April 1994, Tokyo National Stadium)
- Lowest home attendance: 10,797 (vs JEF United Ichihara, 23 March 1994)
- Average home league attendance: 17,835
Home colours	Away colours

1994 Bellmare Hiratsuka season

== Review and events ==
=== League results summary ===
Overall								Home						Away					
Pld	W	D	L	GF	GA	GD	Pts	W	D	L	GF	GA	GD	W	D	L	GF	GA	GD
44	23	0	21	75	80	−5	69	14	0	8	37	32	+5	9	0	13	38	48	−10

Source: J.LEAGUE OFFICIAL 1995 RECORD & DATA. ISBN 4-09-102317-7.

=== League results by round ===
J.League Suntory series (first stage)
Round	1	2	3	4	5	6	7	8	9	10	11	12	13	14	15	16	17	18	19	20	21	22
Ground	A	H	A	H	A	H	A	H	A	A	H	A	H	A	H	A	H	A	H	H	A	H
Result	L	W	L	L	L	W	L	L	L	W	L	W	L	W	W	L	L	L	L	W	L	L
Position	11	9	10	10	11	10	11	11	12	11	11	10	11	9	8	9	10	11	11	10	10	11

Source: J.LEAGUE OFFICIAL 1995 RECORD & DATA. ISBN 4-09-102317-7.
A = Away; H = Home; W = Win; D = Draw; L = Loss

J.League NICOS series (second stage)
Round	1	2	3	4	5	6	7	8	9	10	11	12	13	14	15	16	17	18	19	20	21	22
Ground	A	H	A	H	A	H	A	H	A	A	H	A	H	A	H	A	H	A	H	H	A	H
Result	W	L	L	W	W	W	W	W	W	L	W	W	W	L	W	W	W	L	W	W	L	W
Position	5	9	11	6	4	3	1	2	1	3	2	2	1	2	2	2	1	2	2	2	2	2

Source: J.LEAGUE OFFICIAL 1995 RECORD & DATA. ISBN 4-09-102317-7.
A = Away; H = Home; W = Win; D = Draw; L = Loss

== Competitions ==
Competitions	Position
J.League	5th / 12 clubs
Emperor's Cup	Champions
J.League Cup	1st round

== Domestic results ==
=== J.League ===
==== Suntory series ====
12 March 1994 1st-1	Verdy Kawasaki	5–1	Bellmare Hiratsuka	Tokyo National Stadium
19:04 JST (UTC+09)	Takeda 2'; Bismarck 19', 30'; Kitazawa 39'; Hashiratani 68'	J. League	Noguchi 50'	Attendance: 50,843; Referee: Zoran Petrović; Assistant referees: Noboru Ishiyama, Masayoshi Okada; Fourth official: Michio Nakahara

16 March 1994 1st-2	Bellmare Hiratsuka	1–0 (V-goal) (a.e.t.)	Yokohama Marinos	Hiratsuka Stadium
19:02 JST (UTC+09)	Almir 110'	J. League		Attendance: 16,131; Referee: Tatsumi Ōno; Assistant referees: Yū Nakamura, Yasuhiro Matsuzaki; Fourth official: Akio Koizumi; Man of the Match: Taku Watanabe

19 March 1994 1st-3	Shimizu S-Pulse	4–1	Bellmare Hiratsuka	Nihondaira Sports Stadium
15:02 JST (UTC+09)	Sawanobori 9', 72'; Ronaldo 11'; Mukōjima 61'	J. League	Betinho 54'	Attendance: 10,285; Referee: Hiroyuki Umemoto; Assistant referees: Yū Nakamura, Takashi Kunori; Fourth official: Masakazu Hōjō

23 March 1994 1st-4	Bellmare Hiratsuka	2–3	JEF United Ichihara	Hiratsuka Stadium
19:03 JST (UTC+09)	Noguchi 48'; Betinho 85'	J. League	Otze 11'; Jō 13', 24'	Attendance: 10,797; Referee: Hideo Kikuchi; Assistant referees: Takashi Kunori, Tetsu Karakida; Fourth official: Kazuhiko Uchida

26 March 1994 1st-5	Sanfrecce Hiroshima	4–2	Bellmare Hiratsuka	Hiroshima Big Arch
15:03 JST (UTC+09)	Noh 51'; Černý 68', 81'; Moriyasu 89'	J. League	T. Iwamoto 19'; Betinho 76'	Attendance: 12,041; Referee: Yōtarō Moritsu; Assistant referees: Morihisa Yamaguchi, Sōichirō Kaneko; Fourth official: Syūji Kagawa

2 April 1994 1st-6	Bellmare Hiratsuka	2–0	Nagoya Grampus Eight	Tokyo National Stadium
15:02 JST (UTC+09)	Betinho 54' (pen.); Noguchi 88'	J. League		Attendance: 48,640; Referee: Bengt Borjesson; Assistant referees: Kiyoshi Ōta, Hiroshi Fukuda; Fourth official: Katsunori Moriya; Man of the Match: Yoshihiro Natsuka

6 April 1994 1st-7	Gamba Osaka	3–2 (V-goal) (a.e.t.)	Bellmare Hiratsuka	Expo '70 Commemorative Stadium
19:03 JST (UTC+09)	Yamaguchi 57', 89' 104'	J. League	Betinho 64' (pen.); Almir 85'	Attendance: 19,798; Referee: Hideo Kikuchi; Assistant referees: Sōichirō Kaneko, Yoshikazu Hiroshima; Fourth official: Tsuyoshi Miyake

9 April 1994 1st-8	Bellmare Hiratsuka	1–4	Yokohama Flügels	Hiratsuka Stadium
15:03 JST (UTC+09)	Natsuka 86'	J. League	Maeda 36'; Amarilla 44'; Edu 73', 75'	Attendance: 13,971; Referee: Tetsuya Hamana; Assistant referees: Mitsuru Satō, Hiroshi Fukuda; Fourth official: Takatoshi Itō

13 April 1994 1st-9	Urawa Red Diamonds	4–1	Bellmare Hiratsuka	Urawa Komaba Stadium
19:02 JST (UTC+09)	Fukuda 6' (pen.), 42' (pen.), 48', 82'	J. League	Betinho 40' (pen.)	Attendance: 9,408; Referee: Fumikazu Shioyazono; Assistant referees: Mitsuru Satō, Toshiyuki Mayuzumi; Fourth official: Satoru Tanigawa

16 April 1994 1st-10	Júbilo Iwata	1–2	Bellmare Hiratsuka	Júbilo Iwata Stadium
14:00 JST (UTC+09)	38' (o.g.)	J. League	Mirandinha 79'; Ōmoto 82'	Attendance: 13,929; Referee: Yōtarō Moritsu; Assistant referees: Yasushi Tsuchimoto, Kazunori Ōtoshi; Fourth official: Takuya Okada; Man of the Match: Mirandinha

23 April 1994 1st-11	Bellmare Hiratsuka	1–3	Kashima Antlers	Hiratsuka Stadium
15:01 JST (UTC+09)	Betinho 50'	J. League	Alcindo 24', 46'; Hasegawa 63'	Attendance: 14,861; Referee: Yoshimi Ogawa; Assistant referees: Kazuaki Hamaguchi, Hitoshi Yamada; Fourth official: T. Watashita (渡下 武光)

27 April 1994 1st-12	Yokohama Marinos	1–2	Bellmare Hiratsuka	Yokohama Mitsuzawa Football Stadium
19:02 JST (UTC+09)	Medina Bello 26'	J. League	Almir 72'; T. Iwamoto 74'	Attendance: 13,472; Referee: Fumikazu Shioyazono; Assistant referees: Yū Nakamura, Mitsuru Satō; Fourth official: Haruo Suzuki; Man of the Match: Almir

30 April 1994 1st-13	Bellmare Hiratsuka	0–1	Shimizu S-Pulse	Hiratsuka Stadium
15:03 JST (UTC+09)		J. League	Ōenoki 83'	Attendance: 15,540; Referee: Kōetsu Kikuchi; Assistant referees: Kazuaki Hamaguchi, Takashi Kunori; Fourth official: Yoshiharu Nakamura

4 May 1994 1st-14	JEF United Ichihara	1–2	Bellmare Hiratsuka	Ichihara Stadium
19:02 JST (UTC+09)	Otze 31' (pen.)	J. League	Edson 52'; Noguchi 86'	Attendance: 9,826; Referee: Shizuo Takada; Assistant referees: Kazuaki Hamaguchi, Takashi Kunori; Fourth official: Atsushi Nakamura; Man of the Match: Kōji Noguchi

7 May 1994 1st-15	Bellmare Hiratsuka	1–1 (V-goal) (a.e.t.) (5–4 p)	Sanfrecce Hiroshima	Hiratsuka Stadium
18:34 JST (UTC+09)	Mirandinha 89'	J. League	2' (o.g.)	Attendance: 14,785; Referee: Zoran Petrović; Assistant referees: Yasuhiro Matsuzaki, Kazuhisa Osada; Fourth official: Takeshi Ōgiya; Man of the Match: Nobuyuki Kojima
	Penalties
	(penalty missed) Mirandinha; (penalty scored) Natsuka; (penalty scored) Sorimachi; (penalty scored) Almir; (penalty scored) Edson; (penalty scored) Shintō		(penalty scored) Takagi; (penalty missed) Moriyasu; (penalty scored) Moriyama; (penalty scored) Černý; (penalty scored) Hašek; (penalty missed) Shima

14 May 1994 1st-16	Nagoya Grampus Eight	2–1	Bellmare Hiratsuka	Nagoya Mizuho Football Stadium
19:02 JST (UTC+09)	Elivélton 17'; Moriyama 80'	J. League	Noguchi 76'	Attendance: 11,488; Referee: Shinichirō Obata; Assistant referees: Hiroshi Fukuda, Mikio Fukuoka; Fourth official: Toshiya Narita

18 May 1994 1st-17	Bellmare Hiratsuka	1–2 (V-goal) (a.e.t.)	Gamba Osaka	Hiratsuka Stadium
19:03 JST (UTC+09)	39' (o.g.)	J. League	Matsunami 89'; Nakamura 107'	Attendance: 14,321; Referee: Fumikazu Shioyazono; Assistant referees: Takashi Kunori, Kimio Izaki; Fourth official: Toshiya Kumagai

1 June 1994 1st-18	Yokohama Flügels	3–0	Bellmare Hiratsuka	Nagasaki Stadium
19:03 JST (UTC+09)	Harada 20'; Maeda 70'; 88' (o.g.)	J. League		Attendance: 14,051; Referee: Hideo Kikuchi; Assistant referees: Hideaki Harada, Tōru Yamashiro; Fourth official: Shigehisa Yamaguchi

4 June 1994 1st-19	Bellmare Hiratsuka	2–4	Urawa Red Diamonds	Hiratsuka Stadium
15:00 JST (UTC+09)	Watanabe 16'; Betinho 38' (pen.)	J. League	Y. Satō 9', 69'; Lulu 46'; N. Ikeda 65'	Attendance: 14,832; Referee: Kenji Tanaka; Assistant referees: Hitoshi Yamada, Kenichi Koshiyama; Fourth official: Akio Dobashi

8 June 1994 1st-20	Bellmare Hiratsuka	2–1	Júbilo Iwata	Hiratsuka Stadium
19:00 JST (UTC+09)	Almir 47'; Noguchi 77'	J. League	M. Suzuki 43'	Attendance: 15,129; Referee: Shizuo Takada; Assistant referees: Keiichi Sunakawa, Masahiro Katagiri; Fourth official: Jōji Kashihara; Man of the Match: Kazuaki Tasaka

11 June 1994 1st-21	Kashima Antlers	4–0	Bellmare Hiratsuka	Kashima Soccer Stadium
18:32 JST (UTC+09)	Alcindo 9', 62'; Zico 31', 73'	J. League		Attendance: 16,058; Referee: Kenji Tanaka; Assistant referees: Masahiro Katagiri, Masato Nogami; Fourth official: Ichirō Inukai

15 June 1994 1st-22	Bellmare Hiratsuka	0–3	Verdy Kawasaki	Hiratsuka Stadium
19:02 JST (UTC+09)		J. League	Takeda 31'; Miura 64', 69'	Attendance: 15,448; Referee: Masayoshi Okada; Assistant referees: Noboru Ishiyama, Takashi Kunori; Fourth official: Kōzō Shibata

==== NICOS series ====
10 August 1994 2nd-1	Verdy Kawasaki	1–2	Bellmare Hiratsuka	Kawasaki Todoroki Stadium
19:01 JST (UTC+09)	Kitazawa 59'	J. League	Noguchi 11', 57'	Attendance: 10,630; Referee: Kiyoshi Ōta; Assistant referees: Noboru Ishiyama, Takeshi Ōkura; Fourth official: Michio Nakahara; Man of the Match: Kōji Noguchi

13 August 1994 2nd-2	Bellmare Hiratsuka	0–4	Yokohama Marinos	Hiratsuka Stadium
18:32 JST (UTC+09)		J. League	Díaz 26', 85'; Medina Bello 68', 75'	Attendance: 15,592; Referee: Tetsuya Hamana; Assistant referees: Noboru Ishiyama, Kazuaki Hamaguchi; Fourth official: Ryū Tetsusashi

17 August 1994 2nd-3	Shimizu S-Pulse	1–0	Bellmare Hiratsuka	Sapporo Atsubetsu Stadium
14:03 JST (UTC+09)	Naitō 65'	J. League		Attendance: 18,214; Referee: Zoran Petrović; Assistant referees: Tetsu Karakida, Kenichi Koshiyama; Fourth official: Naoyuki Takahashi

20 August 1994 2nd-4	Bellmare Hiratsuka	3–1	JEF United Ichihara	Hiratsuka Stadium
18:33 JST (UTC+09)	Noguchi 46'; T. Iwamoto 64'; Ōmoto 73'	J. League	Jō 8'	Attendance: 15,334; Referee: Tatsumi Ōno; Assistant referees: Takashi Kunori, Kazuhisa Osada; Fourth official: Junichi Sasaki; Man of the Match: Akira Narahashi

27 August 1994 2nd-5	Sanfrecce Hiroshima	1–6	Bellmare Hiratsuka	Hiroshima Stadium
18:33 JST (UTC+09)	Shima 54'	J. League	Noguchi 21', 43', 70'; Betinho 66'; Kumon 68'; Edson 74'	Attendance: 12,771; Referee: Fumikazu Shioyazono; Assistant referees: Hiroshi Tanabe, Mitsuo Kadota; Fourth official: Kazuhiko Matsumura; Man of the Match: Kōji Noguchi

31 August 1994 2nd-6	Bellmare Hiratsuka	2–0	Nagoya Grampus Eight	Hiratsuka Stadium
19:03 JST (UTC+09)	Betinho 23' (pen.); Almir 84'	J. League		Attendance: 15,486; Referee: Kiyoshi Ōta; Assistant referees: Keiichi Sunakawa, Mitsuru Satō; Fourth official: Junichi Takahashi; Man of the Match: Edson

3 September 1994 2nd-7	Gamba Osaka	0–3	Bellmare Hiratsuka	Expo '70 Commemorative Stadium
19:03 JST (UTC+09)		J. League	T. Iwamoto 48', 65'; Nishiyama 86'	Attendance: 19,505; Referee: Yōtarō Moritsu; Assistant referees: Hiroshi Tanabe, Kazunori Ōtoshi; Fourth official: Tsuyoshi Miyake; Man of the Match: Teruo Iwamoto

7 September 1994 2nd-8	Bellmare Hiratsuka	2–1 (V-goal) (a.e.t.)	Yokohama Flügels	Tokyo National Stadium
19:03 JST (UTC+09)	H. Iwamoto 79'; T. Iwamoto 116'	J. League	Edu 60' (pen.)	Attendance: 44,338; Referee: Tatsumi Ōno; Assistant referees: Kazuaki Hamaguchi, Tetsuya Hamana; Fourth official: Kanichi Takahashi; Man of the Match: Hironari Iwamoto

10 September 1994 2nd-9	Urawa Red Diamonds	1–4	Bellmare Hiratsuka	Omiya Football Stadium
18:32 JST (UTC+09)	Rummenigge 80'	J. League	Edson 14'; Betinho 27', 43'; Narahashi 30'	Attendance: 9,230; Referee: Tetsuya Hamana; Assistant referees: Takeshi Ōkura, Kimio Izaki; Fourth official: Toshimitsu Yasumoto; Man of the Match: Betinho

14 September 1994 2nd-10	Júbilo Iwata	3–1	Bellmare Hiratsuka	Júbilo Iwata Stadium
18:59 JST (UTC+09)	Paus 29'; Matsubara 46', 59'	J. League	Betinho 36'	Attendance: 14,256; Referee: Shinichirō Obata; Assistant referees: Yoshitsugu Katayama, Yasushi Tsuchimoto; Fourth official: Takuya Okada

17 September 1994 2nd-11	Bellmare Hiratsuka	3–1	Kashima Antlers	Hiratsuka Stadium
18:32 JST (UTC+09)	Betinho 5'; Noguchi 79', 87'	J. League	Kurosaki 78'	Attendance: 15,523; Referee: Keiichi Sunakawa; Assistant referees: Masahiro Katagiri, Tetsu Karakida; Fourth official: Masaki Yoshihara; Man of the Match: Kōji Noguchi

21 September 1994 2nd-12	Yokohama Marinos	1–2	Bellmare Hiratsuka	Yokohama Mitsuzawa Football Stadium
19:02 JST (UTC+09)	Ueno 79'	J. League	Betinho 18' (pen.), 82'	Attendance: 13,448; Referee: Masayoshi Okada; Assistant referees: Kazuaki Hamaguchi, Hiroshi Fukuda; Fourth official: Mineo Takada; Man of the Match: Betinho

19 October 1994 2nd-13	Bellmare Hiratsuka	2–1	Shimizu S-Pulse	Hiratsuka Stadium
19:02 JST (UTC+09)	Noguchi 5'; Betinho 88'	J. League	Hasegawa 74'	Attendance: 15,200; Referee: Alberto Tejada; Assistant referees: Keiichi Sunakawa, Yasuhiro Matsuzaki; Fourth official: Michio Nakahara; Man of the Match: Akira Narahashi

22 October 1994 2nd-14	JEF United Ichihara	2–1	Bellmare Hiratsuka	Ichihara Stadium
18:33 JST (UTC+09)	Sandro 52'; Nakanishi 60'	J. League	Noguchi 86'	Attendance: 14,635; Referee: Tetsuya Hamana; Assistant referees: Toshiyuki Mayuzumi, Kazuhisa Osada; Fourth official: Misao Kataoka

26 October 1994 2nd-15	Bellmare Hiratsuka	4–1	Sanfrecce Hiroshima	Hiratsuka Stadium
19:03 JST (UTC+09)	Betinho 38' (pen.), 64'; Noguchi 58'; Watanabe 78'	J. League	Černý 89'	Attendance: 15,094; Referee: Kiyoshi Ōta; Assistant referees: Hitoshi Yamada, Takashi Kunori; Fourth official: Katsumi Ishii; Man of the Match: Kōji Noguchi

29 October 1994 2nd-16	Nagoya Grampus Eight	0–4	Bellmare Hiratsuka	Gifu Nagaragawa Stadium
14:33 JST (UTC+09)		J. League	Betinho 50' (pen.); Nishiyama 51'; Noguchi 64'; Almir 79'	Attendance: 23,899; Referee: Masahiro Sogawa; Assistant referees: Keiichi Sunakawa, Satoru Ishizawa; Fourth official: Tatsuo Gotō; Man of the Match: Hiroaki Kumon

2 November 1994 2nd-17	Bellmare Hiratsuka	3–0	Gamba Osaka	Hiratsuka Stadium
19:00 JST (UTC+09)	Noguchi 30'; Betinho 54', 86'	J. League		Attendance: 15,122; Referee: Shizuo Takada; Assistant referees: Satoru Kawano, Mitsuru Satō; Fourth official: Jōji Kashihara; Man of the Match: Betinho

5 November 1994 2nd-18	Yokohama Flügels	3–0	Bellmare Hiratsuka	Yokohama Mitsuzawa Football Stadium
15:02 JST (UTC+09)	13' (o.g.); Válber 59'; Aldro 87'	J. League		Attendance: 13,890; Referee: Hiroyuki Umemoto; Assistant referees: Kōji Taniuchi, Takeshi Ōkura; Fourth official: Mitsuo Ōno

9 November 1994 2nd-19	Bellmare Hiratsuka	2–0	Urawa Red Diamonds	Hiratsuka Stadium
19:03 JST (UTC+09)	Betinho 57'; Almir 87'	J. League		Attendance: 15,013; Referee: Naotsugu Fuse; Assistant referees: Kazuaki Hamaguchi, Toshiyuki Mayuzumi; Fourth official: Masaki Yoshihara; Man of the Match: Edson

12 November 1994 2nd-20	Bellmare Hiratsuka	1–0	Júbilo Iwata	Hiratsuka Stadium
15:02 JST (UTC+09)	Narahashi 36'	J. League		Attendance: 15,604; Referee: Alberto Tejada; Assistant referees: Hiroshi Fukuda, Takashi Kunori; Fourth official: Takeshi Ōgiya; Man of the Match: Akira Narahashi

16 November 1994 2nd-21	Kashima Antlers	3–1	Bellmare Hiratsuka	Kashima Soccer Stadium
19:03 JST (UTC+09)	Masuda 6'; Hasegawa 35'; Alcindo 41'	J. League	Edson 83'	Attendance: 15,457; Referee: Masayoshi Okada; Assistant referees: Yū Nakamura, Masahiro Katagiri; Fourth official: Ichirō Inukai

19 November 1994 2nd-22	Bellmare Hiratsuka	2–1	Verdy Kawasaki	Hiratsuka Stadium
15:01 JST (UTC+09)	Edson 21'; Betinho 65'	J. League	Fujiyoshi 25'	Attendance: 15,621; Referee: Hiroyuki Umemoto; Assistant referees: Noboru Ishiyama, Kimio Izaki; Fourth official: Haruo Suzuki; Man of the Match: Betinho

=== Emperor's Cup ===
4 December 1994 1st Round	Toa Construction Industry	1–5	Bellmare Hiratsuka	Kumamoto Suizenji Stadium
: JST (UTC+09)	Gersinho (?)		Betinho (?); T. Iwamoto (?); Noguchi (?); Tasaka (?)

11 December 1994 2nd Round	JEF United Ichihara	1–2 (a.e.t.)	Bellmare Hiratsuka	Maebashi Athletic Stadium
: JST (UTC+09)	Maslovar (?)		Betinho (?); Noguchi (?)

18 December 1994 Quarterfinals	Bellmare Hiratsuka	2–1	Tokyo Gas	Expo '70 Commemorative Stadium
: JST (UTC+09)	Edson (?); T. Iwamoto (?)		Yoshioka (?)

23 December 1994 Semifinals	Bellmare Hiratsuka	3–2	Gamba Osaka	Tokyo National Stadium
: JST (UTC+09)	Noguchi 52'; Betinho 69'; Watanabe 82'		Matsuyama 78'; Kitamura 81'

1 January 1995 Final	Bellmare Hiratsuka	2–0	Cerezo Osaka	Tokyo National Stadium
: JST (UTC+09)	Noguchi 47', 86'

=== J.League Cup ===
27 July 1994 1st Round	Júbilo Iwata	2–1	Bellmare Hiratsuka	Júbilo Iwata Stadium
19:00 JST (UTC+09)	Schillaci 9', 35'	J. League	T. Iwamoto 86' (pen.)	Attendance: 14,375; Referee: Tetsuya Hamana; Assistant referees: Yasushi Tsuchimoto, Takashi Kunori; Fourth official: Takuya Okada

== Player statistics ==
Pos.	Nat.	Player	D.o.B. (Age)	Height / Weight	J.League		Emperor's Cup		J.League Cup		Total	
Pos.	Nat.	Player	D.o.B. (Age)	Height / Weight	Apps	Goals	Apps	Goals	Apps	Goals	Apps	Goals
FW	(Brazil)	Mirandinha	July 2, 1959 (aged 34)	172 cm / 68 kg	13	2	0	0	1	0	14	2
DF	(Japan)	Katsuyoshi Shintō	September 15, 1960 (aged 33)	180 cm / 73 kg	14	0	0	0	0	0	14	0
MF	(Brazil)	Edson	November 29, 1962 (aged 31)	183 cm / 75 kg	36	5	5	1	1	0	42	6
MF	(Japan)	Yasuharu Sorimachi	March 8, 1964 (aged 30)	173 cm / 64 kg	25	0	2	0	1	0	28	0
GK	(Japan)	Nobuyuki Kojima	January 17, 1966 (aged 28)	187 cm / 85 kg	41	0	5	0	1	0	47	0
DF	(Japan)	Fujio Yamamoto	May 27, 1966 (aged 27)	179 cm / 72 kg	0	0		0	0	0		0
MF	(Brazil)	Betinho	June 14, 1966 (aged 27)	172 cm / 70 kg	37	24	5	3	0	0	42	27
DF	(Japan)	Hiroaki Kumon	October 20, 1966 (aged 27)	169 cm / 65 kg	28	1	5	0	0	0	33	1
MF	(Japan)	Hiroaki Matsuyama	August 31, 1967 (aged 26)	171 cm / 70 kg	5	0	0	0	0	0	5	0
GK	(Japan)	Kiyoto Furushima	April 3, 1968 (aged 25)	187 cm / 80 kg	3	0	1	0	0	0	4	0
FW	(Brazil)	Almir	March 26, 1969 (aged 24)	175 cm / 65 kg	38	7	4	0	1	0	43	7
FW	(Japan)	Tadateru Ōmoto	April 6, 1969 (aged 24)	173 cm / 69 kg	8	2	0	0	0	0	8	2
MF	(Japan)	Tetsuya Takada	July 31, 1969 (aged 24)	178 cm / 72 kg	15	0	0	0	1	0	16	0
DF	(Japan)	Yoshihiro Natsuka	October 7, 1969 (aged 24)	182 cm / 72 kg	41	1	5	0	1	0	47	1
FW	(Japan)	Kōji Noguchi	June 5, 1970 (aged 23)	177 cm / 68 kg	42	19	5	5	1	0	48	24
MF	(Japan)	Hironari Iwamoto	June 27, 1970 (aged 23)	170 cm / 65 kg	16	1	1	0	0	0	17	1
FW	(Japan)	Nobushige Kawada	December 3, 1970 (aged 23)	173 cm / 67 kg	0	0		0	0	0		0
FW	(Japan)	Hirokazu Ōta	April 10, 1971 (aged 22)	181 cm / 74 kg	0	0		0	0	0		0
DF	(Japan)	Kazuaki Tasaka	August 3, 1971 (aged 22)	173 cm / 68 kg	35	0	5	1	1	0	41	1
DF	(Japan)	Taku Watanabe	November 9, 1971 (aged 22)	187 cm / 79 kg	40	2	5	1	1	0	46	3
DF	(Japan)	Akira Narahashi	November 26, 1971 (aged 22)	170 cm / 72 kg	39	2	4	0	1	0	44	2
DF	(Japan)	Norio Haryū	January 14, 1972 (aged 22)	175 cm / 68 kg	0	0		0	0	0		0
DF	(Japan)	Teruo Iwamoto	May 2, 1972 (aged 21)	178 cm / 70 kg	37	6	5	3	1	1	43	10
FW	(Japan)	Seiichi Igarashi	June 5, 1972 (aged 21)	180 cm / 68 kg	0	0		0	0	0		0
MF	(Japan)	Tamotsu Nakamura	April 10, 1973 (aged 20)	170 cm / 65 kg	0	0		0	0	0		0
DF	(Japan)	Misao Hino	April 12, 1973 (aged 20)	178 cm / 72 kg	0	0		0	0	0		0
GK	(Japan)	Hitoshi Sasaki	July 9, 1973 (aged 20)	178 cm / 75 kg	0	0		0	0	0		0
MF	(Japan)	Yoshiya Takemura	December 6, 1973 (aged 20)	170 cm / 62 kg	1	0	0	0	0	0	1	0
MF	(Japan)	Daichi Matsuyama	January 11, 1974 (aged 20)	172 cm / 66 kg	6	0	0	0	0	0	6	0
MF	(Japan)	Kazuyuki Takahashi	May 10, 1974 (aged 19)	170 cm / 64 kg	0	0		0	0	0		0
GK	(Japan)	Masanori Chiba	July 2, 1974 (aged 19)	183 cm / 77 kg	0	0		0	0	0		0
MF	(Japan)	Masato Harasaki	August 13, 1974 (aged 19)	178 cm / 70 kg	0	0		0	0	0		0
FW	(Japan)	Takaaki Nakamura	September 8, 1974 (aged 19)	174 cm / 69 kg	0	0		0	0	0		0
MF	(Japan)	Takehiko Aoki	November 28, 1974 (aged 19)	173 cm / 65 kg	0	0		0	0	0		0
DF	(Japan)	Masahiro Ejiri	February 10, 1975 (aged 19)	179 cm / 71 kg	0	0		0	0	0		0
MF	(Japan)	Teppei Nishiyama	February 22, 1975 (aged 19)	176 cm / 69 kg	17	2	4	0	1	0	22	2
MF	(Japan)	Jin Hiroi	April 3, 1975 (aged 18)	172 cm / 64 kg	0	0		0	0	0		0
DF	(Japan)	Keisuke Nakagawa	May 29, 1975 (aged 18)	170 cm / 62 kg	0	0		0	0	0		0
DF	(Japan)	Masahiro Kuzuno	July 2, 1975 (aged 18)	180 cm / 73 kg	0	0		0	0	0		0
GK	(Japan)	Akihiro Yoshida †	May 28, 1975 (aged 18)	183 cm / 75 kg	0	0		0	0	0		0
MF	(Japan)	Takeshi Shimizu †	August 18, 1975 (aged 18)	174 cm / 68 kg	0	0		0	0	0		0

- † player(s) joined the team after the opening of this season.

== Transfers ==
In:

No.	Pos.	Nation	Player
—	DF	JPN	Fujio Yamamoto (from NKK)
—	DF	JPN	Kazuaki Tasaka (from Tokai University)
—	FW	JPN	Hirokazu Ōta (from Doshisha University)
—	DF	JPN	Keisuke Nakagawa (from Kumamoto Nogyo High School)
—	MF	JPN	Yasuharu Sorimachi (from Yokohama Flügels)
—	FW	BRA	Almir (from Central Español/Santos)
—	DF	JPN	Masahiro Kuzuno (from Noboribetsu Otani High School)
—	MF	JPN	Jin Hiroi (from Shonandai High School)
—	DF	JPN	Norio Haryū (from Toho Titanium)

Out: no data

== Transfers during the season ==
=== In ===
- (Japan) Akihiro Yoshida (from Takamatsu Commercial High School)
- (Japan) Takeshi Shimizu (from Teikyo Daisan High School)

== Awards ==
- J.League Rookie of the Year: (Japan) Kazuaki Tasaka
- J.League Best XI: (Japan) Yoshihiro Natsuka, (Brazil) Betinho

== Other pages ==
- (in Japanese) J. League official site
- (in Japanese) Shonan Bellmare official website
