= Katsuyoshi Shinto =

Japanese footballer and manager

Katsuyoshi Shinto 信藤 健仁
Personal information
- Full name: Katsuyoshi Shinto
- Date of birth: September 15, 1960 (age 66)
- Place of birth: Hiroshima, Hiroshima, Japan
- Height: 1.80 m (5 ft 11 in)
- Position: Defender

Youth career
- 1976–1978: Yasufuruichi High School
- 1979–1982: Chuo University

Senior career*
Years	Team	Apps	(Gls)
1983–1990	Mazda		
1990–1992	Urawa Reds	43	(2)
1993–1995	Bellmare Hiratsuka	28	(0)

International career
1987–1990	Japan	15	(1)

Managerial career
- 2001–2002: Yokohama FC
Medal record
Toyo Industries
Runner-up	Emperor's Cup	1987
Bellmare Hiratsuka
Winner	Emperor's Cup	1994
- * Club domestic league appearances and goals

Katsuyoshi Shinto (信藤 健仁, Shinto Katsuyoshi; born September 15, 1960) is a former Japanese football player and manager. He played for Japan national team. He used his name "信藤 克義" until 1992.

== Club career ==
Shinto was born in Hiroshima on September 15, 1960. After graduating from Chuo University, he joined his local club Mazda in 1983. He moved to Mitsubishi Motors (later Urawa Reds) in 1990. He played as regular player. In 1992, founded new league J1 League. However, he lost the opportunity to play in the match. In 1993, he moved to Japan Football League club Fujita Industries (later Bellmare Hiratsuka). The club won the champions in 1993 and was promoted to J1 League. The club won 1994 Emperor's Cup and 1995 Asian Cup Winners' Cup. He retired in 1995.

== National team career ==
On May 27, 1987, Shinto debuted for Japan national team against Senegal. He played at 1988 Summer Olympics qualification, 1990 World Cup qualification and 1990 Asian Games. He played 15 games and scored 1 goal for Japan until 1990.

== Coaching career ==
After retirement, Shinto started coaching career at Bellmare Hiratsuka in 1996. In 1999, he moved to Toho Titanium. In 2001, he signed with Yokohama FC and became a manager. In 2002 season, the club finished at bottom place and he resigned end of the season.

== Club statistics ==
Club performance			League		Cup		League Cup		Total	
Season	Club	League	Apps	Goals	Apps	Goals	Apps	Goals	Apps	Goals
Japan			League		Emperor's Cup		J.League Cup		Total	
1983	Mazda	JSL Division 1								
1984	Mazda	JSL Division 2								
1985/86	Mazda	JSL Division 2								
1986/87	Mazda	JSL Division 1								
1987/88	Mazda	JSL Division 1								
1988/89	Mazda	JSL Division 2								
1989/90	Mazda	JSL Division 2	30	1			2	0	32	1
1990/91	Mitsubishi Motors	JSL Division 1	21	1			1	0	22	1
1991/92	Mitsubishi Motors	JSL Division 1	22	1			1	1	23	2
1992	Urawa Reds	J1 League	-		0	0	1	0	1	0
1993	Fujita Industries	Football League	12	0	3	0	-		15	0
1994	Bellmare Hiratsuka	J1 League	14	0	0	0	0	0	14	0
1995	Bellmare Hiratsuka	J1 League	2	0	0	0	-		2	0
Total			101	3	3	0	5	1	109	4

== National team statistics ==
Japan national team
Year	Apps	Goals
1987	2	0
1988	3	0
1989	8	1
1990	2	0
Total	15	1

== Managerial statistics ==
Team	From	To	Record				
Team	From	To	G	W	D	L	Win %
Yokohama FC	2001	2002	56	12	11	33	21.43
Total			56	12	11	33	21.43
