= Hironari Iwamoto =

Japanese footballer

Hironari Iwamoto 岩元 洋成
Personal information
- Full name: Hironari Iwamoto
- Date of birth: June 27, 1970 (age 56)
- Place of birth: Kagoshima, Japan
- Height: 1.67 m (5 ft 5 1/2 in)
- Position: Defender

Youth career
- 1986–1988: Kagoshima Jitsugyo High School
- 1989–1992: Rissho University

Senior career*
Years	Team	Apps	(Gls)
1993–1998	Bellmare Hiratsuka	102	(4)
1999–2000	Montedio Yamagata	67	(2)
Total		169	(6)
Medal record
Bellmare Hiratsuka
Winner	Emperor's Cup	1994
- * Club domestic league appearances and goals

Hironari Iwamoto (岩元 洋成, Iwamoto Hironari; born June 27, 1970) is a former Japanese football player.

== Playing career ==
Iwamoto was born in Kagoshima Prefecture on June 27, 1970. After graduating from Rissho University, he joined Japan Football League club Fujita Industries (later Bellmare Hiratsuka) in 1993. He played many matches as mainly right and left side back. The club won the champions in 1993 and was promoted to J1 League from 1994. From 1994, the club won the champions 1994 Emperor's Cup and 1995 Asian Cup Winners' Cup. Although his opportunity to play decreased from 1996, he became a regular player in 1998 again. However he was released the club due to their financial problems end of 1998 season. In 1999, he moved to newly was promoted to J2 League club, Montedio Yamagata. He played as regular player in 2 seasons and he retired at the end of the 2000 season.

== Career statistics ==
Appearances and goals by club, season and competition
Club	Season	League			Emperor's Cup		J.League Cup		Total	
Club	Season	Division	Apps	Goals	Apps	Goals	Apps	Goals	Apps	Goals
Fujita Industries	1993	Football League	9	1	1	0	6	0	16	1
Bellmare Hiratsuka	1994	J1 League	16	1	1	0	0	0	17	1
Bellmare Hiratsuka	1995	J1 League	34	0	0	0	—		34	0
Bellmare Hiratsuka	1996	J1 League	7	0	1	0	0	0	8	0
Bellmare Hiratsuka	1997	J1 League	8	0	0	0	5	0	13	0
Bellmare Hiratsuka	1998	J1 League	28	2	2	0	4	0	34	2
Montedio Yamagata	1999	J2 League	32	2	5	0	1	0	38	2
Montedio Yamagata	2000	J2 League	35	0	1	0	2	0	38	0
Career total			169	6	11	0	18	0	198	6
