= Taku Watanabe =

Japanese footballer

Taku Watanabe 渡辺 卓
Personal information
- Full name: Taku Watanabe
- Date of birth: November 9, 1971 (age 54)
- Place of birth: Ibaraki, Japan
- Height: 1.88 m (6 ft 2 in)
- Position: Defender

Youth career
- 1987–1989: Mito Commercial High School

Senior career*
Years	Team	Apps	(Gls)
1990–1995	Bellmare Hiratsuka	122	(4)
1996	Cerezo Osaka	11	(0)
1997–1998	Consadole Sapporo	43	(4)
1999–2000	Mito HollyHock	53	(1)
2001–2002	Montedio Yamagata	53	(2)
Total		282	(11)
Medal record
Bellmare Hiratsuka
Winner	Emperor's Cup	1994
- * Club domestic league appearances and goals

Taku Watanabe (渡辺 卓, Watanabe Taku; born November 9, 1971) is a former Japanese football player.

== Playing career ==
Watanabe was born in Ibaraki Prefecture on November 9, 1971. After graduating from high school, he joined Fujita Industries in 1990. He played several matches from first season and he played many matches as center back from 1992. The club won the champions in 1993 and was promoted to J1 League from 1994. From 1994, he became a regular player and the club won the champions 1994 Emperor's Cup. In 1996, he moved to Cerezo Osaka. However he could not play many matches. In 1997, he moved to Japan Football League club Consadole Sapporo. He played as regular player. The club won the champions in 1997 and was promoted to J1 League from 1998. In 1999, he moved to Japan Football League club Mito HollyHock based in his local. The club won the 3rd place in 1999 and was promoted to J2 League from 2000. In 2001, he moved to J2 club Montedio Yamagata. He retired at the end of the 2002 season.

== Club statistics ==
Club performance			League		Cup		League Cup		Total	
Season	Club	League	Apps	Goals	Apps	Goals	Apps	Goals	Apps	Goals
Japan			League		Emperor's Cup		J.League Cup		Total	
1990/91	Fujita Industries	JSL Division 2	5	0			0	0	5	0
1991/92	Fujita Industries	JSL Division 2	3	0			0	0	3	0
1992	Fujita Industries	Football League	17	1			-		17	1
1993	Fujita Industries	Football League	16	1	1	0	6	0	23	1
1994	Bellmare Hiratsuka	J1 League	40	2	5	1	1	0	46	3
1995	Bellmare Hiratsuka	J1 League	41	0	2	0	-		43	0
1996	Cerezo Osaka	J1 League	11	0	0	0	2	0	13	0
1997	Consadole Sapporo	Football League	29	3	3	1	7	0	39	4
1998	Consadole Sapporo	J1 League	14	1	0	0	4	0	18	1
1999	Mito HollyHock	Football League	20	1	3	1	-		23	2
2000	Mito HollyHock	J2 League	33	0	3	1	2	0	38	1
2001	Montedio Yamagata	J2 League	28	2	3	0	2	0	33	2
2002	Montedio Yamagata	J2 League	25	0	0	0	-		25	0
Total			282	11	20	3	17	0	319	14
