= Teppei Nishiyama =

Japanese footballer

Teppei Nishiyama 西山 哲平
Personal information
- Full name: Teppei Nishiyama
- Date of birth: February 2, 1975 (age 51)
- Place of birth: Kashiwa, Japan
- Height: 1.78 m (5 ft 10 in)
- Position: Midfielder

Youth career
- 1990–1991: Senshu University Matsudo High School

Senior career*
| Years | Team | Apps | (Gls) |
| 1992 | Criciúma | | |
| 1993–1999 | Bellmare Hiratsuka | 93 | (7) |
| 2000–2001 | Montedio Yamagata | 77 | (11) |
| 2002–2009 | Oita Trinita | 153 | (11) |
| Total | | 323 | (29) |
Medal record
Bellmare Hiratsuka
| Winner | Emperor's Cup | 1994 |
Oita Trinita
| Winner | J.League Cup | 2008 |
- * Club domestic league appearances and goals

Teppei Nishiyama (西山 哲平, Nishiyama Teppei; born February 22, 1975) is a former Japanese football player.

== Playing career ==
Nishiyama was born in Kashiwa on February 22, 1975. After dropped out from high school, he moved to Brazil and joined Criciúma in 1992. In 1993, he returned to Japan and joined Fujita Industries (later Bellmare Hiratsuka). He debuted in 1994 and played many matches as offensive midfielder and forward. The club won the champions 1994 Emperor's Cup and 1995 Asian Cup Winners' Cup. However his opportunity to play decreased in 1999. In 2000, he moved to J2 League club Montedio Yamagata. He played as regular player in 2 seasons. In 2002, he moved to J2 club Oita Trinita. In 2002, he played as regular player and the club won the champions and was promoted to J1 League from 2003. From 2003, although he lost regular position, he played many matches as substitutes. In 2008, the club won the champions J.League Cup first major title in club history. However his opportunity to play decreased in 2009 and the club was relegated to J2 end of 2009 season. He retired end of 2009 season.

== Career statistics ==
Appearances and goals by club, season and competition
| Club | Season | League | | | Emperor's Cup | | J.League Cup | | Total | |
| Club | Season | Division | Apps | Goals | Apps | Goals | Apps | Goals | Apps | Goals |
|---|---|---|---|---|---|---|---|---|---|---|
| Fujita Industries | 1993 | Football League | 0 | 0 | 0 | 0 | 0 | 0 | 0 | 0 |
| Bellmare Hiratsuka | 1994 | J1 League | 17 | 2 | 4 | 0 | 1 | 0 | 22 | 2 |
| Bellmare Hiratsuka | 1995 | J1 League | 25 | 2 | 2 | 0 | — | | 27 | 2 |
| Bellmare Hiratsuka | 1996 | J1 League | 3 | 0 | 0 | 0 | 5 | 0 | 8 | 0 |
| Bellmare Hiratsuka | 1997 | J1 League | 16 | 1 | 2 | 0 | 0 | 0 | 18 | 1 |
| Bellmare Hiratsuka | 1998 | J1 League | 24 | 2 | 1 | 0 | 1 | 0 | 26 | 2 |
| Bellmare Hiratsuka | 1999 | J1 League | 8 | 0 | 1 | 0 | 1 | 0 | 10 | 0 |
| Montedio Yamagata | 2000 | J2 League | 36 | 6 | 2 | 4 | 2 | 1 | 40 | 11 |
| Montedio Yamagata | 2001 | J2 League | 41 | 5 | 2 | 0 | 2 | 0 | 45 | 5 |
| Oita Trinita | 2002 | J2 League | 40 | 4 | 3 | 0 | — | | 43 | 4 |
| Oita Trinita | 2003 | J1 League | 17 | 0 | 0 | 0 | 3 | 0 | 20 | 0 |
| Oita Trinita | 2004 | J1 League | 14 | 1 | 0 | 0 | 2 | 0 | 16 | 1 |
| Oita Trinita | 2005 | J1 League | 22 | 4 | 2 | 0 | 3 | 0 | 27 | 4 |
| Oita Trinita | 2006 | J1 League | 24 | 1 | 1 | 0 | 3 | 0 | 28 | 1 |
| Oita Trinita | 2007 | J1 League | 19 | 1 | 1 | 0 | 5 | 0 | 25 | 1 |
| Oita Trinita | 2008 | J1 League | 11 | 0 | 1 | 0 | 8 | 0 | 20 | 0 |
| Oita Trinita | 2009 | J1 League | 6 | 0 | 0 | 0 | 3 | 0 | 9 | 0 |
| Career total | | | 323 | 29 | 22 | 4 | 39 | 1 | 384 | 34 |

== Honors and awards ==
=== Team ===
- Emperor's Cup Winner - 1994
- J.League Cup Winner - 2008
- Asian Cup Winners' Cup Winner - 1995
