= Tonoike =

Tonoike (written: 外池 or 外ノ池) is a Japanese surname. Notable people with the surname include:

- Aki Tonoike (外ノ池 亜希, born 1979), Japanese speed skater
- Daisuke Tonoike (外池 大亮, born 1975), Japanese footballer
