= Daichi Matsuyama =

Japanese footballer

Daichi Matsuyama 松山 大地
Personal information
- Full name: Daichi Matsuyama
- Date of birth: January 11, 1974 (age 52)
- Place of birth: Sapporo, Hokkaido, Japan
- Height: 1.70 m (5 ft 7 in)
- Position: Midfielder

Youth career
- 1990–1992: Shizuoka Gakuen High School

Senior career*
Years	Team	Apps	(Gls)
1993–1995	Bellmare Hiratsuka	20	(0)
1996	Consadole Sapporo	0	(0)
Total		20	(0)
Medal record
Bellmare Hiratsuka
Winner	Emperor's Cup	1994
- * Club domestic league appearances and goals

Daichi Matsuyama (松山 大地, Matsuyama Daichi; born January 11, 1974) is a former Japanese football player.

== Playing career ==
Matsuyama was born in Sapporo on January 11, 1974. After graduating from Shizuoka Gakuen High School, he joined Japan Football League (JFL) club Fujita Industries (later Bellmare Hiratsuka) in 1993. The club won the champions in 1993 and was promoted to J1 League. Although he played several matches as midfielder every season, he could not play many matches. In 1996, he moved to JFL club Consadole Sapporo. However he could not play at all in the match and he retired end of 1996 season.

== Club statistics ==
Club performance			League		Cup		League Cup		Total	
Season	Club	League	Apps	Goals	Apps	Goals	Apps	Goals	Apps	Goals
Japan			League		Emperor's Cup		J.League Cup		Total	
1993	Fujita Industries	Football League	5	0	0	0	1	0	6	0
1994	Bellmare Hiratsuka	J1 League	6	0	0	0	0	0	6	0
1995	Bellmare Hiratsuka	J1 League	9	0	0	0	-		9	0
1996	Consadole Sapporo	Football League	0	0	0	0	-		0	0
Total			20	0	0	0	1	0	21	0
