= Betinho (footballer, born 1966) =

Brazilian football manager and former player

Personal information
- Full name: Gilberto Carlos Nascimento
- Date of birth: 14 June 1966 (age 60)
- Place of birth: São Paulo, Brazil
- Height: 1.72 m (5 ft 8 in)
- Position: Midfielder

Senior career*
Years	Team	Apps	(Gls)
1985–1987	Juventus-SP		
1988–1989	Cruzeiro		
1990	Juventus-SP		
1990–1992	Palmeiras		
1992	Cruzeiro		
1993–1996	Bellmare Hiratsuka		
1997–1998	Kawasaki Frontale		
1998–1999	Internacional		
1999	Guarani		
2000	São José-SP		
2001	Santo André		
2002	Ipatinga		
2003	Francana		

International career
1988	Brazil		

Managerial career
- 2004: Juventus-SP U20
- 2004: São Caetano (assistant)
- 2005: Santo André (assistant)
- 2005: São Caetano U20
- 2006: Juventus-SP (assistant)
- 2006–2007: Grêmio Barueri (assistant)
- 2008–2009: Palmeiras B
- 2009: Mirassol (assistant)
- 2009: Mirassol
- 2010: Juventus-SP
- 2010: Oeste Paulista (assistant)
- 2011: Vitória (assistant)
- 2011: Guaratinguetá (assistant)
- 2011: São Caetano (assistant)
- 2011: Avaí (assistant)
- 2012: Marília
- 2013: Guaratinguetá
- 2014–2016: Confiança
- 2016: ASA
- 2016: Confiança
- 2016: Fluminense de Feira
- 2017: Sergipe
- 2017: Itabaiana
- 2018: Nacional-SP
- 2018–2019: Confiança
- 2019: Freipaulistano
- 2019: Sergipe
- 2020: Freipaulistano
- 2021: Lagarto
- 2021: Juazeirense
- 2022: Lagarto
- 2022: CSE
- 2022–2023: Central
- 2023: Luverdense
- 2023: UNIRB
- 2023: Carmópolis
- 2024: Barcelona de Ilhéus
- 2024: Comercial-SP
- 2025: Jequié
- 2025: Lagarto
- 2025: Goianésia
- 2025: Parnahyba
- 2025: Freipaulistano
- 2026: Santa Catarina
- * Club domestic league appearances and goals

Gilberto Carlos Nascimento, commonly known as Betinho (born 14 June 1966), is a Brazilian football coach and former player who played as a midfielder.

== Career statistics ==
=== Club ===
Club performance			League		Cup		League Cup		Total	
Season	Club	League	Apps	Goals	Apps	Goals	Apps	Goals	Apps	Goals
Brazil			League		Copa do Brasil		League Cup		Total	
1988	Cruzeiro	Série A	13	4					13	4
1989	Cruzeiro	Série A	18	2					18	2
1990	Palmeiras	Série A	20	6					20	6
1991	Palmeiras	Série A	17	4					17	4
1992	Palmeiras	Série A	16	3					16	3
1992	Cruzeiro	Série A	0	0					0	0
Japan			League		Emperor's Cup		J.League Cup		Total	
1993	Fujita Industries	Football League	17	11	1	0	6	3	24	14
1994	Bellmare Hiratsuka	J1 League	37	24	5	3	0	0	42	27
1995	Bellmare Hiratsuka	J1 League	50	25	2	1	-		52	26
1996	Bellmare Hiratsuka	J1 League	28	7	3	1	14	1	45	9
1997	Kawasaki Frontale	Football League	28	19	3	3	-		31	22
1998	Kawasaki Frontale	Football League	4	1	0	0	3	1	7	2
Brazil			League		Copa do Brasil		League Cup		Total	
1998	Internacional	Série A	20	3					20	3
1999	Internacional	Série A	0	0					0	0
1999	Guarani	Série A	7	0					7	0
2000	Gama	Série A	5	1					5	1
Country	Brazil		116	23					116	23
Country	Japan		164	87	14	8	23	5	201	100
Total			280	110	14	8	23	5	317	123

=== International ===
Brazil national team
Year	Apps	Goals
1988	1	0
Total	1	0

== Honours ==
=== Player ===
Cruzeiro

- Supercopa Libertadores: 1992
- Campeonato Mineiro: 1992

Shonan Belmare

- Emperor's Cup: 1994
- Asian Cup Winners' Cup: 1995

=== Manager ===
Confiança

- Campeonato Sergipano: 2015

== Awards ==
- Japan Football League Best Eleven - 1993
- J. League Best Eleven - 1994
- Legend of Bellmare - 2003
