= Yasuharu Sorimachi =

Japanese footballer and manager

Yasuharu Sorimachi 反町 康治
Personal information
- Full name: Yasuharu Sorimachi
- Date of birth: March 8, 1964 (age 62)
- Place of birth: Saitama, Saitama, Japan
- Height: 1.73 m (5 ft 8 in)
- Position: Midfielder

Youth career
- 1979–1981: Shimizu Higashi High School
- 1983–1986: Keio University

Senior career*
Years	Team	Apps	(Gls)
1987–1993	Yokohama Flügels	131	(26)
1994–1997	Bellmare Hiratsuka	82	(8)
Total		213	(34)

International career
1990–1991	Japan	4	(0)

Managerial career
- 2001–2005: Albirex Niigata
- 2006–2007: Japan (assistant)
- 2006–2008: Japan U-23
- 2009–2011: Shonan Bellmare
- 2012–2019: Matsumoto Yamaga FC
- 2020–2024: Japan (technical director)
- 2024–: Shimizu S-Pulse (general manager)
Medal record
Yokohama Flügels
Runner-up	Japan Soccer League	1988/89
Winner	Emperor's Cup	1993
Bellmare Hiratsuka
Winner	Emperor's Cup	1994
- * Club domestic league appearances and goals

Yasuharu Sorimachi (反町 康治, Sorimachi Yasuharu; born March 8, 1964) is a Japanese former football player and manager. He played for the Japan national team.

== Club career ==
Sorimachi attended Shimizu Higashi High School and Keio University, playing football for both schools. At Shimizu Higashi, he won the national high school championship alongside teammates Shigeo Sawairi and Tatsuya Mochizuki.

Sorimachi began his senior career with Japan Soccer League side All Nippon Airways in 1987. He helped the club earn promotion to the JSL First Division in 1988. In 1992, following the launch of the professional J.League, the club joined the league as Yokohama Flügels, and Sorimachi continued to play for them. During his time with Flügels, he won the Emperor's Cup in 1993.

In 1994, Sorimachi moved to Bellmare Hiratsuka, later known as Shonan Bellmare. He helped the club win the Emperor's Cup in 1994 and the Asian Cup Winners' Cup in 1995.

== National team career ==
Sorimachi was capped 4 times for the Japan national team between 1990 and 1991. His first international appearance came on July 27, 1990 in a friendly against South Korea. He also played at the 1990 Asian Games.

== Coaching career ==
After retiring as a player, Sorimachi became manager of J2 League club Albirex Niigata in 2001. He led the club to the J2 championship and promotion to the J1 League in 2003, remaining in charge until the end of the 2005 season.

In July 2006, Sorimachi was appointed manager of the Japan U-23 national team, leading the team to qualification for the 2008 Summer Olympics. He also served as an assistant coach for the Japan football team under managers Ivica Osim and Takeshi Okada until July 2007.

In 2009, he returned to Shonan Bellmare as manager, a position he held until 2011. He then managed Matsumoto Yamaga FC from 2012 to 2019. From 2020, he served as technical director of the Japan Football Association. In 2024, he became general manager of Shimizu S-Pulse.

== Club statistics ==
Club performance			League		Cup		League Cup		Total	
Season	Club	League	Apps	Goals	Apps	Goals	Apps	Goals	Apps	Goals
1987/88	All Nippon Airways	JSL Division 2	25	11			4	0	29	11
1988/89	All Nippon Airways	JSL Division 1	17	3			0	0	17	3
1989/90	All Nippon Airways	JSL Division 1	20	7			2	0	22	7
1990/91	All Nippon Airways	JSL Division 1	22	3			4	0	26	3
1991/92	All Nippon Airways	JSL Division 1	21	1			1	0	22	1
1992	Yokohama Flügels	J1 League	-		2	1	5	0	7	1
1993	Yokohama Flügels	J1 League	26	1	3	1	6	2	35	4
1994	Bellmare Hiratsuka	J1 League	25	0	2	0	1	0	28	0
1995	Bellmare Hiratsuka	J1 League	21	3	2	0	–		23	3
1996	Bellmare Hiratsuka	J1 League	14	1	1	0	1	0	16	1
1997	Bellmare Hiratsuka	J1 League	22	4	1	1	1	0	24	5
Total			213	34	11	3	25	2	249	39

== National team statistics ==
Japan national team
Year	Apps	Goals
1990	2	0
1991	2	0
Total	4	0

== Managerial statistics ==
Update; December 31, 2018

Team	From	To	Record				
Team	From	To	G	W	D	L	Win %
Albirex Niigata	2001	2005	196	97	40	59	49.49
Shonan Bellmare	2009	2011	123	44	28	51	35.77
Matsumoto Yamaga FC	2012	present	286	129	76	81	45.10
Total			605	270	144	191	44.63
