= 1998 Bellmare Hiratsuka season =

Bellmare Hiratsuka
1998 season
- Manager: Shigeharu Ueki
- Stadium: Hiratsuka Athletics Stadium
- J.League: 11th
- Emperor's Cup: 4th Round
- J.League Cup: GL-D 3rd
- Top goalscorer: Wagner Lopes (18)
Home colours	Away colours

1998 Bellmare Hiratsuka season

== Competitions ==
Competitions	Position
J.League	11th / 18 clubs
Emperor's Cup	4th Round
J.League Cup	GL-D 3rd / 5 clubs

== Domestic results ==
=== J.League ===
21 March 1998 1-1	Bellmare Hiratsuka	4-1	Verdy Kawasaki	Hiratsuka Athletics Stadium
JST (UTC+09)

25 March 1998 1-2	Vissel Kobe	1-2	Bellmare Hiratsuka	Kobe Universiade Memorial Stadium
JST (UTC+09)

28 March 1998 1-3	Bellmare Hiratsuka	0-1	JEF United Ichihara	Hiratsuka Athletics Stadium
JST (UTC+09)

4 April 1998 1-4	Yokohama Flügels	1-3	Bellmare Hiratsuka	International Stadium Yokohama
JST (UTC+09)

11 April 1998 1-5	Bellmare Hiratsuka	3-2	Cerezo Osaka	Hiratsuka Athletics Stadium
JST (UTC+09)

15 April 1998 1-6	Sanfrecce Hiroshima	0-1	Bellmare Hiratsuka	Hiroshima Stadium
JST (UTC+09)

18 April 1998 1-7	Bellmare Hiratsuka	3-2 (GG) (a.e.t.)	Avispa Fukuoka	Tokyo National Stadium
JST (UTC+09)

25 April 1998 1-8	Consadole Sapporo	3-3 (GG) (a.e.t.) (4-5 p)	Bellmare Hiratsuka	Muroran Irie Stadium
JST (UTC+09)

29 April 1998 1-9	Bellmare Hiratsuka	1-2	Shimizu S-Pulse	Hiratsuka Athletics Stadium
JST (UTC+09)

2 May 1998 1-10	Kashima Antlers	1-0	Bellmare Hiratsuka	Kashima Soccer Stadium
JST (UTC+09)

5 May 1998 1-11	Bellmare Hiratsuka	1-3	Kashiwa Reysol	Hiratsuka Athletics Stadium
JST (UTC+09)

9 May 1998 1-12	Gamba Osaka	1-2 (GG) (a.e.t.)	Bellmare Hiratsuka	Osaka Expo '70 Stadium
JST (UTC+09)

25 July 1998 1-13	Bellmare Hiratsuka	1-4	Yokohama Marinos	Hiratsuka Athletics Stadium
JST (UTC+09)

29 July 1998 1-14	Urawa Red Diamonds	2-1	Bellmare Hiratsuka	Urawa Komaba Stadium
JST (UTC+09)

1 August 1998 1-15	Bellmare Hiratsuka	0-5	Nagoya Grampus Eight	Hiratsuka Athletics Stadium
JST (UTC+09)

5 August 1998 1-16	Bellmare Hiratsuka	1-2 (GG) (a.e.t.)	Kyoto Purple Sanga	Hiratsuka Athletics Stadium
JST (UTC+09)

8 August 1998 1-17	Júbilo Iwata	3-1	Bellmare Hiratsuka	Júbilo Iwata Stadium
JST (UTC+09)

22 August 1998 2-1	Bellmare Hiratsuka	0-4	Urawa Red Diamonds	Hiratsuka Athletics Stadium
JST (UTC+09)

29 August 1998 2-2	Nagoya Grampus Eight	2-0	Bellmare Hiratsuka	Mizuho Athletic Stadium
JST (UTC+09)

5 September 1998 2-3	Kyoto Purple Sanga	1-2	Bellmare Hiratsuka	Nishikyogoku Athletic Stadium
JST (UTC+09)

12 September 1998 2-4	Bellmare Hiratsuka	1-2	Júbilo Iwata	Hiratsuka Athletics Stadium
JST (UTC+09)

15 September 1998 2-5	Verdy Kawasaki	3-2	Bellmare Hiratsuka	Niigata City Athletic Stadium
JST (UTC+09)

19 September 1998 2-6	Bellmare Hiratsuka	1-0	Vissel Kobe	Hiratsuka Athletics Stadium
JST (UTC+09)

23 September 1998 2-7	JEF United Ichihara	4-2	Bellmare Hiratsuka	Ichihara Seaside Stadium
JST (UTC+09)

26 September 1998 2-8	Bellmare Hiratsuka	3-1	Yokohama Flügels	Tokyo National Stadium
JST (UTC+09)

3 October 1998 2-9	Cerezo Osaka	2-1	Bellmare Hiratsuka	Osaka Nagai Stadium
JST (UTC+09)

14 October 1998 2-10	Bellmare Hiratsuka	3-0	Sanfrecce Hiroshima	Hiratsuka Athletics Stadium
JST (UTC+09)

18 October 1998 2-11	Avispa Fukuoka	0-2	Bellmare Hiratsuka	Nagasaki Athletic Stadium
JST (UTC+09)

21 October 1998 2-12	Bellmare Hiratsuka	2-2 (GG) (a.e.t.) (4-3 p)	Consadole Sapporo	Hiratsuka Athletics Stadium
JST (UTC+09)

24 October 1998 2-13	Shimizu S-Pulse	3-0	Bellmare Hiratsuka	Nihondaira Sports Stadium
JST (UTC+09)

31 October 1998 2-14	Bellmare Hiratsuka	0-2	Kashima Antlers	Hiratsuka Athletics Stadium
JST (UTC+09)

3 November 1998 2-15	Kashiwa Reysol	1-3	Bellmare Hiratsuka	Hitachi Kashiwa Soccer Stadium
JST (UTC+09)

7 November 1998 2-16	Bellmare Hiratsuka	2-1	Gamba Osaka	Hiratsuka Athletics Stadium
JST (UTC+09)

14 November 1998 2-17	Yokohama Marinos	4-2	Bellmare Hiratsuka	International Stadium Yokohama
JST (UTC+09)

=== Emperor's Cup ===
1st Round	bye

2nd Round	bye

13 December 1998 3rd Round	Bellmare Hiratsuka	2-1	Tokyo Gas	Hiratsuka Athletics Stadium
JST (UTC+09)

20 December 1998 4th Round	Kashima Antlers	3-0	Bellmare Hiratsuka	Nagasaki Athletic Stadium
JST (UTC+09)

=== J.League Cup ===
16 May 1998 GL-D-1	JEF United Ichihara	3-2	Bellmare Hiratsuka	Ichihara Seaside Stadium
JST (UTC+09)

23 May 1998 GL-D-2	Vissel Kobe	0-2	Bellmare Hiratsuka	Kobe Universiade Memorial Stadium
JST (UTC+09)

30 May 1998 GL-D-3	Bellmare Hiratsuka	1-3	Nagoya Grampus Eight	Hiratsuka Athletics Stadium
JST (UTC+09)

GL-D-4	bye

6 June 1998 GL-D-5	Bellmare Hiratsuka	1-1	Kyoto Purple Sanga	Hiratsuka Athletics Stadium
JST (UTC+09)

== Player statistics ==
No.	Pos.	Nat.	Player	D.o.B. (Age)	Height / Weight	J.League		Emperor's Cup		J.League Cup		Total	
No.	Pos.	Nat.	Player	D.o.B. (Age)	Height / Weight	Apps	Goals	Apps	Goals	Apps	Goals	Apps	Goals
1	GK	(Japan)	Nobuyuki Kojima	January 17, 1966 (aged 32)	cm / kg	34	0						
2	DF	(Japan)	Hironari Iwamoto	June 27, 1970 (aged 27)	cm / kg	28	2						
3	DF	(Japan)	Satoshi Tsunami	August 14, 1961 (aged 36)	cm / kg	5	0						
4	DF	(Brazil)	Claudio	March 31, 1972 (aged 25)	cm / kg	29	6						
5	MF	(Japan)	Kazuaki Tasaka	August 3, 1971 (aged 26)	cm / kg	33	0						
6	DF	(Japan)	Hiroaki Kumon	October 20, 1966 (aged 31)	cm / kg	23	0						
7	MF	(Japan)	Hidetoshi Nakata	January 22, 1977 (aged 21)	cm / kg	12	3						
8	DF	(Japan)	Yoshihiro Natsuka	October 7, 1969 (aged 28)	cm / kg	27	0						
9	FW	(Japan)	Koji Seki	June 26, 1972 (aged 25)	cm / kg	7	0						
10	FW	(Japan)	Wagner Lopes	January 29, 1969 (aged 29)	cm / kg	29	18						
11	MF	(Brazil)	Ricardinho	November 26, 1975 (aged 22)	cm / kg	27	11						
12	DF	(Japan)	Tetsuya Takada	July 31, 1969 (aged 28)	cm / kg	18	0						
13	FW	(Japan)	Hiroshi Sakai	October 19, 1976 (aged 21)	cm / kg	3	0						
14	MF	(Japan)	Masato Harasaki	August 13, 1974 (aged 23)	cm / kg	8	1						
15	MF	(Japan)	Teppei Nishiyama	February 22, 1975 (aged 23)	cm / kg	24	2						
16	GK	(Japan)	Makoto Kakegawa	May 23, 1973 (aged 24)	cm / kg	0	0						
17	MF	(Japan)	Tomoaki Matsukawa	April 18, 1973 (aged 24)	cm / kg	28	3						
18	DF	(Japan)	Takashi Miki	July 23, 1978 (aged 19)	cm / kg	13	0						
19	MF	(Japan)	Daisuke Tonoike	January 29, 1975 (aged 23)	cm / kg	8	1						
20	DF	(South Korea)	Hong Myung-Bo	February 12, 1969 (aged 29)	cm / kg	32	0						
21	GK	(Japan)	Hitoshi Sasaki	July 9, 1973 (aged 24)	cm / kg	0	0						
22	DF	(Japan)	Takuya Kawaguchi	October 11, 1978 (aged 19)	cm / kg	6	0						
23	GK	(Japan)	Akihiro Yoshida	May 28, 1975 (aged 22)	cm / kg	0	0						
24	DF		Park Kyung-Hwan	December 29, 1976 (aged 21)	cm / kg	0	0						
25	DF	(Japan)	Kenji Takeichi	June 25, 1977 (aged 20)	cm / kg	0	0						
26	DF	(Japan)	Yu Tokisaki	June 15, 1979 (aged 18)	cm / kg	0	0						
27	MF	(Japan)	Tomoyoshi Ono	August 12, 1979 (aged 18)	cm / kg	2	0						
28	FW	(Japan)	Manabu Komatsubara	April 2, 1981 (aged 16)	cm / kg	3	0						
29	FW	(Japan)	Yasuyuki Moriyama	May 1, 1969 (aged 28)	cm / kg	4	0						
29	MF	(Romania)	Pavel Badea	June 10, 1967 (aged 30)	cm / kg	8	0						
30	MF	(Japan)	Jiro Hiratsuka	December 2, 1979 (aged 18)	cm / kg	2	0						
31	FW	(Japan)	Yasunori Takada	February 22, 1979 (aged 19)	cm / kg	13	0						
32	MF	(Japan)	Keisuke Kurihara	May 20, 1973 (aged 24)	cm / kg	16	5						
33	DF	(Japan)	Kohei Usui	July 16, 1979 (aged 18)	cm / kg	9	0						
?	GK	(Japan)	Ryoji Hiroishi	May 26, 1979 (aged 18)	cm / kg	0	0						
?	MF	(Japan)	Nobuhiro Sadatomi	July 5, 1979 (aged 18)	cm / kg	0	0						

== Other pages ==
- (in Japanese) J.League official site
