= Fujio Yamamoto =

Japanese footballer

Fujio Yamamoto 山本 富士雄
Personal information
- Full name: Fujio Yamamoto
- Date of birth: 27 May 1966 (age 60)
- Place of birth: Kanagawa, Japan
- Height: 1.79 m (5 ft 10 1/2 in)
- Position: Defender

Team information
- Current team: Atletico Suzuka (manager)

Youth career
- Odawara High School
- University of Tsukuba

Senior career*
Years	Team	Apps	(Gls)
1990–1992	Urawa Reds	5	(1)
1993	NKK	14	(0)
1994–1996	Bellmare Hiratsuka	27	(0)
Total		46	(1)

Managerial career
- 1997–2007: Toin Gakuen High School
- 2008: Tama University Meguro Junior and Senior High School
- 2009–2013: Toin Gakuen High School
- 2014–2017: Zhejiang FC (U-17 – U-20)
- 2019–2021: Renofa Yamaguchi (U-18)
- 2023–2024: Blancdieu Hirosaki
- 2025–: Atletico Suzuka
Medal record
Bellmare Hiratsuka
Winner	Emperor's Cup	1994
- * Club domestic league appearances and goals

Fujio Yamamoto (山本 富士雄, Yamamoto Fujio; born May 27, 1966) is a Japanese football manager and former player. He currently manager of club, Atletico Suzuka.

== Playing career ==
Yamamoto was born in Kanagawa Prefecture on May 27, 1966. After graduating from University of Tsukuba, he joined Japan Soccer League club Mitsubishi Motors (later Urawa Reds) in 1990. He played several matches as defender. In 1992, Japan Soccer League was folded and founded new league J1 League. However he has no opportunity to play, he moved to Japan Football League club NKK in 1993. Although he played many matches, the club was disbanded end of 1993 season. In 1994, he moved to newly was promoted to J1 League club, Bellmare Hiratsuka. He retired end of 1996 season.

== Managerial career ==
On 20 December 2022, Yamamoto was announce official appointment manager of Tohoku Soccer League club, Blancdieu Hirosaki from 2023 season.

On 7 December 2024, Yamamoto was announce official appointment manager of JFL club, Atletico Suzuka from 2025 season.

== Career statistics ==
=== Club ===
Club performance			League		Cup		League Cup		Total	
Season	Club	League	Apps	Goals	Apps	Goals	Apps	Goals	Apps	Goals
Japan			League		Emperor's Cup		J.League Cup		Total	
1990/91	Mitsubishi Motors	JSL Division 1	1	0			0	0	1	0
1991/92	Mitsubishi Motors	JSL Division 1	4	1			0	0	4	1
1992	Urawa Reds	J1 League	-		0	0	0	0	0	0
1993	NKK	Football League	14	0	1	0	0	0	15	0
1994	Bellmare Hiratsuka	J1 League	0	0			0	0	0	0
1995	Bellmare Hiratsuka	J1 League	17	0	0	0	-		17	0
1996	Bellmare Hiratsuka	J1 League	10	0	0	0	4	0	14	0
Total			46	1	1	0	8	0	55	0

== Managerial statistics ==
As of the start for 2025 season.

Team	From	To	Record				
Team	From	To	G	W	D	L	Win %
Blancdieu Hirosaki	2023	2024	45	35	4	6	77.78
Atletico Suzuka	2025	present	0	0	0	0	—
Total			45	35	4	6	77.78
