= Hirokazu Ota =

Japanese footballer

Hirokazu Ota 太田 裕和
Personal information
- Date of birth: April 10, 1971 (age 55)
- Place of birth: Kyoto, Japan
- Height: 1.81 m (5 ft 11 in)
- Position: Forward

Youth career
- 1990–1993: Doshisha University

Senior career*
Years	Team	Apps	(Gls)
1994–1995	Bellmare Hiratsuka	2	(0)
1996	Cosmo Oil Yokkaichi		
1996	Blaze Kumamoto		
1997–1998	Albirex Niigata	26	(12)
Medal record
Bellmare Hiratsuka
Winner	Emperor's Cup	1994
- * Club domestic league appearances and goals

Hirokazu Ota (太田 裕和, Ota Hirokazu; born April 10, 1971) is a Japanese former footballer who played as a forward.

== Career ==
Ota was born in Kyoto Prefecture on April 10, 1971. After graduating from Doshisha University, he joined Bellmare Hiratsuka in 1994. Although he played as forward in two matches in 1995, he could hardly play in the match. In 1996, he played for Japan Football League (JFL) club Cosmo Oil Yokkaichi and Regional Leagues club Blaze Kumamoto. In 1997, he moved to Regional Leagues club Albirex Niigata. He played as regular player and the club was promoted to JFL from 1998. He retired end of 1998 season.
