= Cláudio (footballer, born 1972) =

Brazilian footballer

Personal information
- Full name: Cláudio Luís Assunção de Freitas
- Date of birth: 31 March 1972 (age 54)
- Place of birth: São Paulo, Brazil
- Height: 1.88 m (6 ft 2 in)
- Position: Defender

Senior career*
Years	Team	Apps	(Gls)
1993–1994	União São João		
1995	Flamengo		
1996	Palmeiras		
1997–2000	Bellmare Hiratsuka		
1999–2000	→ Santos (loan)		
2001	Etti Jundiai		
2001	Cerezo Osaka		
2001	Etti Jundiai		
2002	América-SP		
- * Club domestic league appearances and goals

Cláudio Luís Assunção de Freitas (born 31 March 1972) is a former Brazilian football player.

== Career statistics ==
Appearances and goals by club, season and competition
Club	Season	League			Emperor's Cup		J.League Cup		Total	
Club	Season	Division	Apps	Goals	Apps	Goals	Apps	Goals	Apps	Goals
Bellmare Hiratsuka	1997	J1 League	26	6	3	2	6	0	35	8
Bellmare Hiratsuka	1998	J1 League	29	6	1	0	4	1	34	7
Bellmare Hiratsuka	1999	J1 League	10	1	0	0	0	0	10	1
Cerezo Osaka	2001	J1 League	2	0	0	0	0	0	2	0
Career total			67	13	4	2	10	1	81	16
