= Hiroshi Sakai =

Japanese footballer

Hiroshi Sakai 坂井 浩
Personal information
- Full name: Hiroshi Sakai
- Date of birth: October 19, 1976 (age 50)
- Place of birth: Mie, Japan
- Height: 1.78 m (5 ft 10 in)
- Position: Forward

Youth career
- 1992–1994: Yokkaichi Chuo Kogyo High School

Senior career*
Years	Team	Apps	(Gls)
1995–1999	Bellmare Hiratsuka	29	(6)
2000	Oita Trinita	2	(0)
Total		31	(6)

International career
1993	Japan U-17	2	(0)
- * Club domestic league appearances and goals

Hiroshi Sakai (坂井 浩, Sakai Hiroshi; born October 19, 1976) is a former Japanese football player.

== Club career ==
Sakai was born in Mie Prefecture on October 19, 1976. After graduating from high school, he joined Bellmare Hiratsuka in 1995. He debuted and played many matches in 1997. The club released many players due to their financial problems end of 1998 season. In early 1999, he played many matches in the club with many young players. However his opportunity to play decreased in late 1999. The club also finished at bottom place and was relegated to J2 League. In 2000, he moved to J2 club Oita Trinita. However he could hardly play in the match and he retired end of 2000 season.

== National team career ==
In August 1993, Sakai was selected Japan U-17 national team for 1993 U-17 World Championship and he played 2 matches.

== Career statistics ==
Appearances and goals by club, season and competition
Club	Season	League			Emperor's Cup		J.League Cup		Total	
Club	Season	Division	Apps	Goals	Apps	Goals	Apps	Goals	Apps	Goals
Bellmare Hiratsuka	1995	J1 League	0	0			—		0	0
Bellmare Hiratsuka	1996	J1 League	0	0			0	0	0	0
Bellmare Hiratsuka	1997	J1 League	12	4	1	1	0	0	13	5
Bellmare Hiratsuka	1998	J1 League	3	0			2	1	5	1
Bellmare Hiratsuka	1999	J1 League	14	2			1	0	15	2
Oita Trinita	2000	J2 League	2	0			0	0	2	0
Career total			31	6	1	1	3	1	35	8
