= Edson (footballer, born 1962) =

Brazilian footballer (born 1962)

Personal information
- Full name: Edson Aparecido de Souza
- Date of birth: 29 November 1962 (age 63)
- Place of birth: São Paulo, Brazil
- Height: 1.83 m (6 ft 0 in)
- Position: Midfielder

Senior career*
Years	Team	Apps	(Gls)
1986–1990	Yomiuri		
1990–1995	Bellmare Hiratsuka		
1997–2000	Yokogawa Electric		
- * Club domestic league appearances and goals

Edson Aparecido de Souza (born 29 November 1962), known as just Edson, is a former Brazilian football player.

== Club statistics ==
Club performance			League		Cup		League Cup		Total	
Season	Club	League	Apps	Goals	Apps	Goals	Apps	Goals	Apps	Goals
Japan			League		Emperor's Cup		J.League Cup		Total	
1986/87	Yomiuri	JSL Division 1	19	1	4	0	0	0	23	1
1987/88	Yomiuri	JSL Division 1	13	0	2	0	0	0	15	0
1988/89	Yomiuri	JSL Division 1	12	1	1	0	2	0	15	1
1989/90	Yomiuri	JSL Division 1	18	0	2	0	2	1	22	1
1990/91	Fujita Industries	JSL Division 2	30	5			1	0	31	5
1991/92	Fujita Industries	JSL Division 2	30	10			3	0	33	10
1992	Fujita Industries	Football League	18	4			-		18	4
1993	Fujita Industries	Football League	18	4	1	0	4	0	23	4
1994	Bellmare Hiratsuka	J1 League	36	5	5	1	1	0	42	6
1995	Bellmare Hiratsuka	J1 League	37	4	2	0	-		39	4
1997	Yokogawa Electric	Regional Leagues								
1998	Yokogawa Electric	Regional Leagues								
1999	Yokogawa Electric	Football League	23	3	-		-		23	3
2000	Yokogawa Electric	Football League	10	3	1	0	-		11	3
Total			202	38	9	1	9	0	220	39
