= Masahiro Kuzuno =

Japanese footballer and manager (born 1975)

Personal information
- Date of birth: 2 July 1975 (age 51)
- Place of birth: Sapporo, Hokkaido, Japan
- Height: 1.80 m (5 ft 11 in)
- Position: Defender

Youth career
- Hitsujigaoka Junior HS
- 1991–1993: Noboribetsu Ohtani HS

Senior career*
Years	Team	Apps	(Gls)
1994–1996	Bellmare Hiratsuka	0	(0)
1997–1998	Albirex Niigata		
1999–2003	Jatco	91	(7)
2004–2006	Sagawa Printing SC	61	(2)

Managerial career
- 2007–2012: Sagawa Printing SC (assistant)
- 2014–2017: ReinMeer Aomori
- 2018: Vanraure Hachinohe
- 2020: Vanraure Hachinohe (assistant)
- 2021–2022: Vanraure Hachinohe
- 2023–: Cobaltore Onagawa
- * Club domestic league appearances and goals

Masahiro Kuzuno (葛野 昌宏, Kuzuno Masahiro; born 2 July 1975) is a Japanese former footballer.

== Managerial career ==
Kuzuno left Vanraure Hachinohe in June 2022, apologising for not living up to expectations. Ahead of the 2023 season, he was appointed manager of Cobaltore Onagawa.

== Career statistics ==
=== Club ===
Club	Season	League			National Cup		League Cup		Continental		Other		Total	
Club	Season	Division	Apps	Goals	Apps	Goals	Apps	Goals	Apps	Goals	Apps	Goals	Apps	Goals
Bellmare Hiratsuka	1994	J.League	0	0	0	0	0	0	0	0	0	0	0	0
Bellmare Hiratsuka	1995	J.League	0	0	0	0	–		0	0	0	0	0	0
Bellmare Hiratsuka	1996	J.League	0	0	0	0	0	0	0	0	0	0	0	0
Bellmare Hiratsuka	Total		0	0	0	0	0	0	0	0	0	0	0	0
Jatco	1999	JFL	13	0	0	0	–		–		0	0	13	0
Jatco	2000	JFL	15	2	0	0	–		–		0	0	15	2
Jatco	2001	JFL	19	2	0	0	–		–		0	0	19	2
Jatco	2002	JFL	15	0	0	0	–		–		0	0	15	0
Jatco	2003	JFL	29	3	0	0	–		–		0	0	29	3
Jatco	Total		91	7	0	0	0	0	0	0	0	0	91	7
Sagawa Printing	2004	JFL	28	1	0	0	–		–		0	0	28	1
Sagawa Printing	2005	JFL	22	0	0	0	–		–		0	0	22	0
Sagawa Printing	2006	JFL	11	1	0	0	–		–		0	0	11	1
Sagawa Printing	Total		61	2	0	0	0	0	0	0	0	0	61	2
Career total			152	9	0	0	0	0	0	0	0	0	152	9

== Managerial statistics ==
As of 28 March 2021.

Managerial record by team and tenure
Team	From	To	Record				
Team	From	To	P	W	D	L	Win %
ReinMeer Aomori	2014	2017	67	35	16	16	52.2
Vanraure Hachinohe	2018	2018	28	15	8	5	53.6
Vanraure Hachinohe	2021	present	3	1	1	1	33.3
Total			98	51	25	22	52.0
