= Daisuke Tonoike =

Japanese footballer

Daisuke Tonoike 外池 大亮
Personal information
- Full name: Daisuke Tonoike
- Date of birth: January 29, 1975 (age 51)
- Place of birth: Yokohama, Japan
- Height: 1.84 m (6 ft 1/2 in)
- Positions: Forward; midfielder

Youth career
- 1990–1992: Waseda Jitsugyo High School
- 1993–1996: Waseda University

Senior career*
Years	Team	Apps	(Gls)
1997–1999	Bellmare Hiratsuka	41	(8)
2000–2002	Yokohama F. Marinos	34	(8)
2001	→ Omiya Ardija (loan)	12	(4)
2003	Ventforet Kofu	43	(7)
2004	Sanfrecce Hiroshima	7	(0)
2005	Montedio Yamagata	19	(0)
2006–2007	Shonan Bellmare	27	(2)
Total		183	(29)
Medal record
Yokohama F. Marinos
Runner-up	J1 League	2000
Runner-up	J1 League	2002
Winner	J.League Cup	2001
- * Club domestic league appearances and goals

Daisuke Tonoike (外池 大亮, Tonoike Daisuke; born January 29, 1975) is a former Japanese football player.

== Playing career ==
Tonoike was born in Yokohama on January 29, 1975. After graduating from Waseda University, he joined J1 League club Bellmare Hiratsuka (later Shonan Bellmare) in 1997. He played as forward in 1997 and 1998 season. The club released many players due to their financial problems end of 1998 season. In 1999, although he played many matches as midfielder, the club was finished at bottom place and was relegated to J2 League. In 2000, he moved to his local club Yokohama F. Marinos. Although he played many matches as forward in 2000, his opportunity to play decreased in 2001. In August 2001, he moved to J2 club Omiya Ardija on loan. In 2002, he returned to Yokohama F. Marinos. However he could hardly play in the match. In 2003, he moved to J2 club Ventforet Kofu. He became a regular player as defensive midfielder. In 2004, he moved to Sanfrecce Hiroshima. However he could not play many matches. In 2005, he moved to J2 club Montedio Yamagata. He played as defensive midfielder. In 2006, he moved to his first club Shonan Bellmare. Although he played as midfielder in 2006, he played as forward at own hope in 2007. He retired end of 2007 season.

== Club statistics ==
Club performance			League		Cup		League Cup		Total	
Season	Club	League	Apps	Goals	Apps	Goals	Apps	Goals	Apps	Goals
Japan			League		Emperor's Cup		J.League Cup		Total	
1997	Bellmare Hiratsuka	J1 League	9	3	0	0	0	0	9	3
1998	Bellmare Hiratsuka	J1 League	8	1	0	0	4	2	12	3
1999	Bellmare Hiratsuka	J1 League	24	4	1	1	2	0	27	5
2000	Yokohama F. Marinos	J1 League	25	8	3	0	6	3	34	11
2001	Yokohama F. Marinos	J1 League	7	0	0	0	3	0	10	0
2001	Omiya Ardija	J2 League	12	4	1	0	0	0	13	4
2002	Yokohama F. Marinos	J1 League	2	0	0	0	0	0	2	0
2003	Ventforet Kofu	J2 League	43	7	3	1	-		46	8
2004	Sanfrecce Hiroshima	J1 League	7	0	0	0	5	0	12	0
2005	Montedio Yamagata	J2 League	19	0	2	1	-		21	1
2006	Shonan Bellmare	J2 League	14	1	0	0	-		14	1
2007	Shonan Bellmare	J2 League	13	1	0	0	-		13	1
Total			183	29	10	3	20	5	213	37
