= Wagner Lopes =

Japanese footballer and manager

Wagner Lopes 呂比須 ワグナー
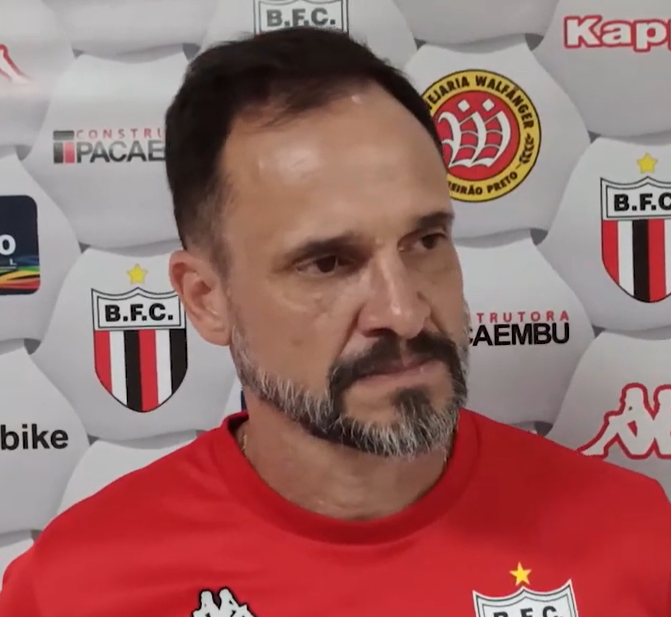
- Lopes as head coach of Botafogo-SP in 2020

Personal information
- Full name: Wagner Augusto Lopes
- Date of birth: 29 January 1969 (age 57)
- Place of birth: Franca, Brazil
- Height: 1.82 m (6 ft 0 in)
- Position: Forward

Team information
- Current team: Goiatuba

Youth career
- São Paulo

Senior career*
Years	Team	Apps	(Gls)
1985–1987	São Paulo	14	(1)
1987–1990	Nissan Motors	49	(12)
1990–1994	Kashiwa Reysol	96	(85)
1995–1996	Honda	60	(67)
1997–1998	Bellmare Hiratsuka	56	(36)
1999–2000	Nagoya Grampus Eight	51	(23)
2001	FC Tokyo	10	(3)
2001–2002	Avispa Fukuoka	27	(13)
Total		363	(229)

International career
1997–1999	Japan	20	(5)

Managerial career
- 2005–2007: Paulista (assistant)
- 2010: Paulista
- 2010: PAEC
- 2011: Paulista
- 2012: Gamba Osaka (assistant)
- 2013: Comercial
- 2013: São Bernardo
- 2014: Botafogo-SP
- 2014: Criciúma
- 2014: Atlético Goianiense
- 2015: Goiás
- 2015: Bragantino
- 2016: Atlético Goianiense
- 2016: Sampaio Corrêa
- 2017: Paraná
- 2017: Albirex Niigata
- 2018: Paraná
- 2018–2019: Atlético Goianiense
- 2020: Botafogo-SP
- 2021: Vila Nova
- 2021: Vitória
- 2024: CRAC
- 2024: Comercial-SP
- 2024: PSS Sleman
- 2025–2026: Luverdense
- 2027–: Goiatuba
Medal record
Nissan Motors
Winner	Japan Soccer League	1988/89
Winner	Japan Soccer League	1989/90
Winner	JSL Cup	1988
Winner	JSL Cup	1989
Winner	Emperor's Cup	1988
Winner	Emperor's Cup	1989
Nagoya Grampus Eight
Winner	Emperor's Cup	1999
- * Club domestic league appearances and goals

Wagner Augusto Lopes (呂比須 ワグナー, Ropesu Wagunā; born 29 January 1969) is a football coach of Campeonato Brasileiro Série C club Goiatuba and former player who played as a forward. Born in Brazil, he played for the Japan national team on 20 occasions.

== Club career ==
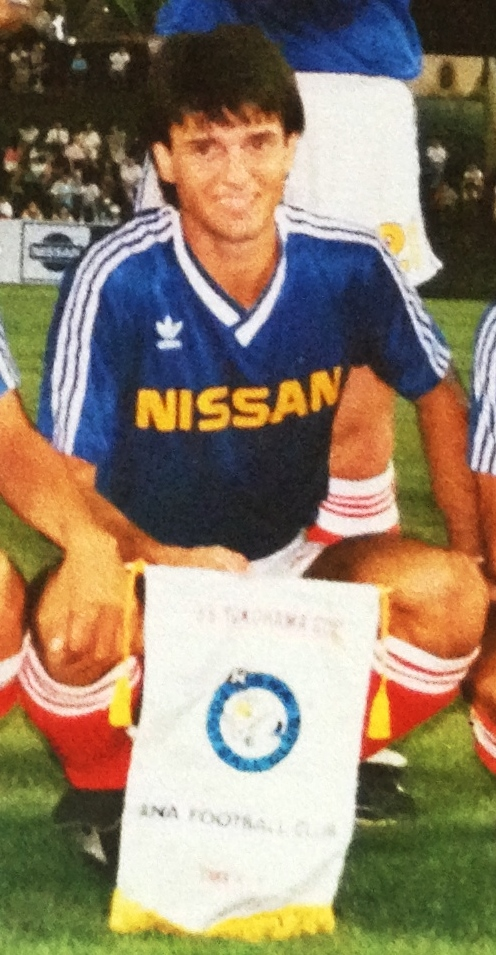
Lopes with Nissan Motors

Lopes was born in Franca, São Paulo and represented São Paulo FC as a youth. In 1987, after two years as a senior, he moved to Japan and signed with Japan Soccer League club Nissan Motors. From 1988 to 1990, the club won all three major titles in Japan; Japan Soccer League, JSL Cup and Emperor's Cup two consecutive seasons.

Lopes moved to Hitachi (later Kashiwa Reysol) in 1990. In 1992, Japan Soccer League was folded and the club joined the new Japan Football League (JFL). The club won 2nd place in 1994 and secured promotion to the J1 League.

In 1994, after Kashiwa signed Müller, Lopes left the club. He joined JFL club Honda in 1995 where he was top scorer for two consecutive seasons (1995-1996). He moved to J1 League club Bellmare Hiratsuka in 1997, playing with Hidetoshi Nakata and scoring regularly. However, he left the club end of 1998 season due to financial strain and moved to Nagoya Grampus Eight, winning the 1999 Emperor's Cup.

Toward the end of his career, Lopes played for FC Tokyo (2001) and Avispa Fukuoka (2001–02). He retired at the end of the 2002 season.

== International career ==
In September 1997, Lopes obtained Japanese citizenship. Immediately after this, he was called up to the Japan national team for the 1998 World Cup qualifiers. On 28 September, he made his national team debut against South Korea.

Lopes went on to play six games and scored three goals to help Japan qualify for their first-ever FIFA World Cup. At the 1998 World Cup, he played all three matches, assisting Masashi Nakayama in Japan's first-ever World Cup goal against Jamaica. He also played at the 1999 Copa America and scored twice.

Lopes played 20 games and scored five goals for Japan until 1999.

== Managerial career ==
Lopes started his career as Vágner Mancini's assistant at Paulista in 2005, helping the club win their first-ever national title, the 2005 Copa do Brasil. He left the club in 2007 due to health problems, but returned in December 2009. Initially an interim for the 2010 season, he was definitely appointed manager on 23 February. In May, he resigned and was subsequently appointed manager of Pão de Açúcar Esporte Clube.

Lopes returned to Paulista in 2011, winning the year's Copa Paulista before returning to Japan and being named Gamba Osaka's assistant manager in 2012. In October 2012, he was presented as manager of Comercial-SP manager for the ensuing campaign. In that season, he also managed São Bernardo.

In the 2014 campaign, Lopes was in charge of Botafogo-SP, Criciúma and Atlético Goianiense. In the following year, he took over Goiás and Bragantino.

== Career statistics ==
=== Club ===
Appearances and goals by club, season and competition
Club	Season	League			State League		National cup		League cup		Total	
Club	Season	Division	Apps	Goals	Apps	Goals	Apps	Goals	Apps	Goals	Apps	Goals
São Paulo	1985	Série A	0	0	0	0	0	0	—		0	0
São Paulo	1986	Série A	0	0	10	1	0	0	—		10	1
São Paulo	1987	Série A	0	0	4	0	0	0	—		4	0
São Paulo	Total		0	0	14	1	0	0	—		14	1
Nissan Motors	1987–88	JSL Division 1	21	8	—						21	8
Nissan Motors	1988–89	JSL Division 1	15	3	—						15	3
Nissan Motors	1989–90	JSL Division 1	13	1	—				4	0	17	1
Nissan Motors	Total		49	12	—		0	0	4	0	53	12
Kashiwa Reysol (Note: "Hitachi" until 1993)	1990–91	JSL Division 2	23	33	—				1	0	24	33
Kashiwa Reysol	1991–92	JSL Division 1	20	4	—				3	4	23	8
Kashiwa Reysol	1992	Football League	17	13	—				-		17	13
Kashiwa Reysol	1993	Football League	18	18	—		0	0	0	0	18	18
Kashiwa Reysol	1994	Football League	18	17	—		0	0	1	0	19	17
Kashiwa Reysol	Total		96	85	—		0	0	5	4	101	89
Honda	1995	Football League	30	31	—		1	0	-		31	31
Honda	1996	Football League	30	36	—		2	1	-		32	37
Honda	Total		60	67	—		3	1	0	0	63	68
Bellmare Hiratsuka	1997	J1 League	27	18	—		3	4	6	8	36	30
Bellmare Hiratsuka	1998	J1 League	29	18	—		2	0	0	0	31	18
Bellmare Hiratsuka	Total		56	36	—		5	4	6	8	67	48
Nagoya Grampus Eight	1999	J1 League	23	13	—		5	2	6	4	34	19
Nagoya Grampus Eight	2000	J1 League	28	10	—		1	1	4	0	33	11
Nagoya Grampus Eight	Total		51	23	—		6	3	10	4	67	30
FC Tokyo	2001	J1 League	10	3	—		0	0	2	4	12	7
Avispa Fukuoka	2001	J1 League	8	7	—		0	0	0	0	8	7
Avispa Fukuoka	2002	J2 League	19	6	—		2	0	-		21	6
Avispa Fukuoka	Total		27	13	—		2	0	0	0	29	13
Career total			349	239	14	1	16	8	23	16	402	264

=== International ===
Appearances and goals by national team and year
National team	Year	Apps	Goals
Japan	1997	6	3
Japan	1998	7	0
Japan	1999	7	2
Total		20	5

Scores and results list Japan's goal tally first, score column indicates score after each Lopes goal.

List of international goals scored by Wagner Lopes
No.	Date	Venue	Opponent	Score	Result	Competition
1	11 October 1997	Tashkent, Uzbekistan	Uzbekistan	1–1	1–1	1998 FIFA World Cup qualification
2	26 October 1997	Tokyo, Japan	United Arab Emirates	1–0	1–1	1998 FIFA World Cup qualification
3	1 November 1997	Seoul, South Korea	South Korea	2–0	2–0	1998 FIFA World Cup qualification
4	29 June 1999	Asunción, Paraguay	Peru	1–0	2–3	1999 Copa América
5	5 July 1999	Pedro Juan Caballero, Paraguay	Bolivia	1–1	1–1	1999 Copa América

== Managerial statistics ==
Team	From	To	Record				
Team	From	To	G	W	D	L	Win %
Albirex Niigata	2017	2017	23	6	5	12	26.09
Total			23	6	5	12	26.09

== Honours ==
=== Player ===
São Paulo

- Campeonato Paulista: 1985, 1987

Nissan Motors

- Japan Soccer League: 1988–89, 1989–90
- JSL Cup: 1988, 1989, 1990
- Emperor's Cup: 1988, 1989

Nagoya Grampus

- Emperor's Cup: 1999

=== Manager ===
Paulista

- Copa Paulista: 2011

Atlético Goianiense

- Campeonato Goiano: 2019

=== Individual ===
- Asian Goal of the Month: November 1997
