= 1992 Japan Football League =

Japan Football League
- Season: 1992
- Champions: Yamaha Motors
- Relegated: To Division 2 Honda; Nippon Kokan To Regional leagues Tanabe Pharmaceutical; Osaka Gas
- Matches: 90
- Goals: 253 (2.81 per match)

Statistics of Japan Football League in the 1992 season.

== First Division ==
=== Clubs ===
The following ten clubs participated in Japan Football League First Division during the 1992 season.

- Fujita Industries
- Fujitsu
- Hitachi
- Honda
- Nippon Kokan
- Otsuka Pharmaceutical
- Tokyo Gas
- Toshiba
- Yamaha Motors
- Yanmar Diesel

=== Personnel ===
Club	Head coach
Fujita Industries	(Japan) Mitsuru Komaeda
Fujitsu	
Hitachi	(Japan) Hiroyuki Usui
Honda	(Japan) Masataka Imai
Nippon Kokan	(Japan) Koji Tanaka
Otsuka Pharmaceutical	(Japan) Kunio Yamade
Tokyo Gas	
Toshiba	(Japan) Takeo Takahashi
Yamaha Motors	(Japan) Kazuaki Nagasawa
Yanmar Diesel	(Japan) Daishiro Yoshimura

=== Foreign players ===
Club	Player 1	Player 2	Player 3	Player 4	Non-visa foreign
Fujita Industries	(Brazil) Edson	(Brazil) Pita	(Brazil) Wagner		
Fujitsu	(China) Gao Sheng				
Hitachi	(Brazil) Betinho	(Brazil) Régis Angeli	(Brazil) Wagner Lopes		(South Korea) Cho Kwi-jae
Honda	(Brazil) Carlos Roberto	(Brazil) Douglas Fonseca	(Brazil) Marus Panzeri		
Nippon Kokan	(China) Duan Ju	(China) Ma Lin			
Otsuka Pharmaceutical	(China) Tang Yaodong	(China) Wang Baoshan			
Tokyo Gas	(Brazil) Amaral				
Toshiba	(Argentina) Daniel Ahmed	(El Salvador) Jorge Villar	(Uruguay) Eduardo Acevedo	(Uruguay) Mario López	
Yamaha Motors	(Brazil) André	(Brazil) Carlos Alberto	(Brazil) Serginho		
Yanmar Diesel	(Brazil) Eliel	(Brazil) Walter			

=== Standings ===
Pos	Club	P	W	D	L	GF	GA	GD	Pts	Notes
1	Yamaha Motors	18	13	5	0	37	6	+31	44	
2	Hitachi	18	12	4	2	37	19	+18	40	
3	Fujita Industries	18	9	4	5	37	22	+15	31	
4	Yanmar Diesel	18	7	3	8	23	19	+4	24	
5	Toshiba	18	6	5	7	30	29	+1	23	
6	Fujitsu	18	5	5	8	19	27	−8	20	
7	Tokyo Gas	18	5	5	8	22	34	−12	20	
8	Otsuka Pharmaceutical	18	4	6	8	17	29	−12	18	
9	Honda	18	4	4	10	19	36	−17	16	Relegated to Second Division
10	Nippon Kokan	18	2	5	11	12	32	−20	11	Relegated to Second Division

Source: RSSSF

== Second Division ==
=== Clubs ===
The following ten clubs participated in Japan Football League Second Division during the 1992 season. Seino Unyu and Osaka Gas had been promoted automatically after winning the Regional Playoffs.

- Chuo Bohan
- Cosmo Oil
- Kawasaki Steel
- Kofu Club
- Kyoto Shiko Club
- NTT Kanto
- Osaka Gas
- Seino Unyu
- Tanabe Pharmaceutical
- Toho Titanium

=== Foreign players ===
Club	Player 1	Player 2	Non-visa foreign
Chuo Bohan	(Argentina) Nestor Omar Piccoli	(Argentina) Raúl Maradona	
Cosmo Oil			
Kawasaki Steel			
Kofu Club			
Kyoto Shiko Club			(Brazil) Jair Masaoka
NTT Kanto			
Osaka Gas			
Seino Unyu			
Tanabe Pharmaceutical			
Toho Titanium			

=== Standings ===
Pos	Club	P	W	D	L	GF	GA	GD	Pts	Notes
1	Chuo Bohan	18	12	2	4	46	21	+25	38	Promoted to First Division
2	Kyoto Shiko Club	18	11	4	3	39	17	+22	37	Promoted to First Division
3	Kawasaki Steel	18	11	2	5	32	17	+15	35	
4	Cosmo Oil	18	9	3	6	26	21	+5	30	
5	Kofu Club	18	9	1	8	26	29	−3	28	
6	NTT Kanto	18	5	7	6	24	20	+4	22	
7	Seino Unyu	18	4	7	7	20	29	−9	19	
8	Toho Titanium	18	2	8	8	9	19	−10	14	
9	Tanabe Pharmaceutical	18	3	5	10	17	32	−15	14	Relegated to Regional Leagues
10	Osaka Gas	18	3	3	12	14	48	−34	12	Relegated to Regional Leagues

Source: RSSSF
