= 1995–96 Asian Cup Winners' Cup =

Tournament details
- Teams: 23

Final positions
- Champions: (Japan) Bellmare Hiratsuka (1st title)
- Runners-up: (Iraq) Al Talaba

The 1995–96 Asian Cup Winners' Cup was the sixth edition of association football competition run by the Asian Football Confederation specifically for its members cup holders.

== First round ==
=== West Asia ===
Team 1	Agg.	Team 2	1st leg	2nd leg
Homenmen (Lebanon)	2–1	(Bahrain) Al Wahda	0–0	2–1
Oman	2–4	(Kuwait) Kazma	1–1	1–3
Al Talaba (Iraq)	5–4	(Qatar) Al Ittihad	5–3	0–1
FK Yangiyer (Uzbekistan)	4–1	(Turkmenistan) Turan Daşoguz	3–0	1–1
Vostok Ust-Kamenogorsk (Kazakhstan)	(w/o)^{1}	(Kyrgyzstan) AkMaral		
Bahman (Iran)	bye			
Al Ain (United Arab Emirates)	bye			
Riyadh SC (Saudi Arabia)	bye			

^{1} AkMaral withdrew

=== East Asia ===
Team 1	Agg.	Team 2	1st leg	2nd leg
New Radiant (Maldives)	(w/o)^{1}	(Sri Lanka) Ratnam Sports Club	2–0	
Sabah FA (Malaysia)	3–1	(Vietnam) An Giang	3–0	0–1
Bellmare Hiratsuka (Japan)	bye			
East Bengal Club (India)	bye			
Petrokimia Putra (Indonesia)	bye			
Rajapracha UCOM FC (Thailand)	bye			
Uhlsport Rangers (Hong Kong)	bye			
Yokohama Flügels (Japan)	bye			

^{1} Ratnam withdrew after 1st leg

== Second round ==
=== West Asia ===
Team 1	Agg.	Team 2	1st leg	2nd leg
Homenmen (Lebanon)	0–5	(Saudi Arabia) Riyadh SC	0–2	0–3
Kazma (Kuwait)	6–0	(United Arab Emirates) Al Ain	2–0	4–0
Al Talaba (Iraq)	3–2	(Uzbekistan) FK Yangiyer	2–0	1–2
Vostok Ust-Kamenogorsk (Kazakhstan)	2–3	(Iran) Bahman	2–2	0–1

=== East Asia ===
Team 1	Agg.	Team 2	1st leg	2nd leg
Uhlsport Rangers (Hong Kong)	3–7	(Japan) Yokohama Flügels	1–3	2–4
New Radiant (Maldives)	3–2	(India) East Bengal Club	3–0	0–2
Sabah FA (Malaysia)	1–7	(Japan) Bellmare Hiratsuka	1–2	0–5
Rajapracha UCOM FC (Thailand)	7–7 (a)	(Indonesia) Petrokimia Putra	5–4	2–3

== Quarterfinals ==
=== West Asia ===
Team 1	Agg.	Team 2	1st leg	2nd leg
Riyadh SC (Saudi Arabia)	2–2 (a)	(Kuwait) Kazma	2–1	0–1
Bahman (Iran)	1–2	(Iraq) Al Talaba	0–1	1–1

=== East Asia ===
Team 1	Agg.	Team 2	1st leg	2nd leg
Bellmare Hiratsuka (Japan)	7–1	(Indonesia) Petrokimia Putra	6–0	1–1
New Radiant (Maldives)	0–7	(Japan) Yokohama Flügels	0–2	0–5

== Semifinals ==
East Asia
25 December 1995

Bellmare Hiratsuka (Japan)	4–3 (a.e.t.)	(Japan) Yokohama Flügels
Émerson 13' (pen.), 44' (pen.), 71', 90+2'		Evair 56', 89' (pen.); Mitsuoka 83'

Hiratsuka, Japan
West Asia

Al Talaba (Iraq)	(w/o)^{1}	(Kuwait) Kazma / (Saudi Arabia) Riyadh SC

^{1} Both Kazma and their replacement Riyadh SC withdrew

== Final ==
27 December 1995

Bellmare Hiratsuka (Japan)	2–1	(Iraq) Al Talaba
Narahashi 27'; Nakata 81'		Jeayer 51'

Mitsuzawa Stadium
Yokohama, Japan
