= 1994 Emperor's Cup =

Tournament details
- Country: Japan

Final positions
- Champions: Bellmare Hiratsuka
- Runners-up: Cerezo Osaka
- Semifinalists: Yokohama Marinos; Gamba Osaka

This article documents statistics from the Emperor's Cup of the 1994 season.

== Overview ==
There were 32 teams that participated in the contest, and Bellmare Hiratsuka won the championship.

== Results ==
=== 1st round ===
- Sanfrecce Hiroshima 1–0 Cosmo Oil Yokkaichi
- Kofu 1–0 Sapporo University
- Yokohama Marinos 2–0 Hokuriku Electric Power
- NEC Yamagata 2–3 Nagoya Grampus Eight
- Yokohama Flügels 1–0 PJM Futures
- Senshu University 1–3 Urawa Red Diamonds
- Cerezo Osaka 1–0 Komazawa University
- Fujieda Blux 1–4 Verdy Kawasaki
- Kashima Antlers 0–2 Tokyo Gas
- Kokushikan University 1–0 Ritsumeikan University
- Bellmare Hiratsuka 5–1 Toa Corporation
- Toshiba 0–2 JEF United Ichihara
- Júbilo Iwata 1–3 Otsuka Pharmaceutical
- Hannan University 1–3 Gamba Osaka
- Nippon Denso 1–3 Kyoto Purple Sanga
- Kawasaki Steel 2–1 Shimizu S-Pulse

=== 2nd round ===
- Sanfrecce Hiroshima 2–0 Kofu
- Yokohama Marinos 1–0 Nagoya Grampus Eight
- Yokohama Flügels 0–2 Urawa Red Diamonds
- Cerezo Osaka 1–0 Verdy Kawasaki
- Tokyo Gas 1–0 Kokushikan University
- Bellmare Hiratsuka 2–1 JEF United Ichihara
- Otsuka Pharmaceutical 0–5 Gamba Osaka
- Kyoto Purple Sanga 3–1 Kawasaki Steel

=== Quarterfinals ===
- Sanfrecce Hiroshima 0–3 Yokohama Marinos
- Urawa Red Diamonds 0–1 Cerezo Osaka
- Tokyo Gas 1–2 Bellmare Hiratsuka
- Gamba Osaka 2–0 Kyoto Purple Sanga

=== Semifinals ===
- Yokohama Marinos 1–2 Cerezo Osaka
- Bellmare Hiratsuka 3–2 Gamba Osaka

=== Final ===
- Cerezo Osaka 0–2 Bellmare Hiratsuka

Bellmare Hiratsuka won the championship.
