= 1995 Yokohama Flügels season =

Yokohama Flügels
1995 season
- Manager: Bunji Kimura; Silva (from 30 June 1995)
- Stadium: Yokohama Mitsuzawa Football Stadium
- J.League: 13th
- Emperor's Cup: 2nd Round
- Asian Super Cup: Champions
- Asian Cup Winners' Cup: Semifinals
- Top goalscorer: Evair (15)
- Highest home attendance: 14,104 (vs Yokohama Marinos, 19 August 1995); 41,239 (vs Kashima Antlers, 6 September 1995, Tokyo National Stadium)
- Lowest home attendance: 9,089 (vs Sanfrecce Hiroshima, 22 November 1995)
- Average home league attendance: 15,802
Home colours	Away colours

1995 Yokohama Flügels season

== Review and events ==
=== League results summary ===
Overall								Home						Away					
Pld	W	D	L	GF	GA	GD	Pts	W	D	L	GF	GA	GD	W	D	L	GF	GA	GD
52	20	0	32	78	111	−33	62	10	0	16	37	53	−16	10	0	16	41	58	−17

Source: J.LEAGUE OFFICIAL RECORD & DATA 1996. ISBN 4-09-102323-1.

=== League results by round ===
J.League Suntory series (first stage)
Round	1	2	3	4	5	6	7	8	9	10	11	12	13	14	15	16	17	18	19	20	21	22	23	24	25	26
Ground	H	A	H	A	H	H	A	A	H	H	A	H	A	H	A	H	A	A	H	H	A	A	H	A	H	A
Result	W	W	L	L	L	L	W	L	L	L	L	W	L	L	W	L	W	W	W	L	L	L	L	L	W	L
Position	4	2	5	6	9	11	9	11	10	11	12	10	12	13	13	14	13	13	12	13	13	13	13	13	13	13

Source: J.LEAGUE OFFICIAL RECORD & DATA 1996. ISBN 4-09-102323-1.
A = Away; H = Home; W = Win; D = Draw; L = Loss

J.League NICOS series (second stage)
Round	1	2	3	4	5	6	7	8	9	10	11	12	13	14	15	16	17	18	19	20	21	22	23	24	25	26
Ground	H	A	H	A	H	A	H	H	A	H	A	H	A	H	A	H	A	H	A	A	H	A	H	A	H	A
Result	L	W	W	W	L	L	L	W	L	L	L	W	W	L	L	L	L	W	L	W	L	W	W	L	W	L
Position	14	11	8	5	8	8	10	9	9	10	11	10	10	8	8	12	12	12	12	11	12	11	11	11	11	11

Source: J.LEAGUE OFFICIAL RECORD & DATA 1996. ISBN 4-09-102323-1.
A = Away; H = Home; W = Win; D = Draw; L = Loss

== Competitions ==
Competitions	Position
J.League	13th / 14 clubs
Emperor's Cup	2nd round
Asian Super Cup	Champions
Asian Cup Winners' Cup	Semifinals

== Domestic results ==
=== J.League ===
18 March 1995 1st-1	Yokohama Flügels	1–0	Urawa Red Diamonds	Yokohama Mitsuzawa Football Stadium
15:03 JST (UTC+09)	Maeda 27'	J. League		Attendance: 12,236; Referee: Armando Perez; Assistant referees: Noboru Ishiyama, Masahiro Katagiri; Fourth official: Toshiya Kumagai; Man of the Match: Sampaio

22 March 1995 1st-2	Bellmare Hiratsuka	0–3	Yokohama Flügels	Hiratsuka Stadium
19:04 JST (UTC+09)		J. League	Maezono 4'; Evair 80'; Maeda 82'	Attendance: 13,305; Referee: Hideo Kikuchi; Assistant referees: Toshiyuki Mayuzumi, Takayoshi Kashino; Fourth official: Masaki Yoshihara; Man of the Match: Atsuhiko Mori

25 March 1995 1st-3	Yokohama Flügels	0–1	Yokohama Marinos	Tokyo National Stadium
15:03 JST (UTC+09)		J. League	Bisconti 12'	Attendance: 36,039; Referee: Juan Carlos Crespi; Assistant referees: Takashi Kunori, Kazuhisa Osada; Fourth official: Hide Lii

29 March 1995 1st-4	Kashiwa Reysol	2–1 (V-goal) (a.e.t.)	Yokohama Flügels	Kashiwa Hitachi Stadium
19:03 JST (UTC+09)	Müller 57' 99'	J. League	Hirakawa 23'	Attendance: 15,114; Referee: Lutz Fröhlich; Assistant referees: Hiroshi Fukuda, Akihisa Makino; Fourth official: Fujirō Masukura

1 April 1995 1st-5	Yokohama Flügels	1–2 (V-goal) (a.e.t.)	Sanfrecce Hiroshima	Kumamoto Suizenji Stadium
14:00 JST (UTC+09)	Evair 21'	J. League	Moriyasu 36'; Hašek 102'	Attendance: 10,481; Referee: Shinichirō Obata; Assistant referees: Tōru Yamashiro, Hiroyuki Izumi; Fourth official: Mitsuo Kimura

5 April 1995 1st-6	Yokohama Flügels	0–1	Kashima Antlers	Yokohama Mitsuzawa Football Stadium
19:03 JST (UTC+09)		J. League	Kurosaki 64'	Attendance: 13,753; Referee: Tatsumi Ōno; Assistant referees: Yū Nakamura, Tōru Kamikawa; Fourth official: Takeshi Ōgiya

8 April 1995 1st-7	Shimizu S-Pulse	2–3	Yokohama Flügels	Nihondaira Sports Stadium
15:04 JST (UTC+09)	Toninho 71', 75'	J. League	Maeda 38', 51'; Maezono 54'	Attendance: 18,409; Referee: Juan Carlos Crespi; Assistant referees: Morihisa Yamaguchi, Kōji Taniuchi; Fourth official: Masakazu Hōjō; Man of the Match: Osamu Maeda

12 April 1995 1st-8	Verdy Kawasaki	4–1	Yokohama Flügels	Kawasaki Todoroki Stadium
19:04 JST (UTC+09)	Alcindo 15'; Bismarck 35', 76' (pen.); Takeda 79'	J. League	Hattori 10'	Attendance: 14,940; Referee: Naotsugu Fuse; Assistant referees: Yasuhiro Matsuzaki, Akihisa Makino; Fourth official: Mineo Takada

15 April 1995 1st-9	Yokohama Flügels	2–3	Cerezo Osaka	Yokohama Mitsuzawa Football Stadium
15:00 JST (UTC+09)	Maezono 18'; Hattori 33'	J. League	Valdés 41'; Kanda 81'; Kizawa 87'	Attendance: 12,257; Referee: Fumikazu Shioyazono; Assistant referees: Mitsuru Satō, Kazuhisa Osada; Fourth official: Junichi Sasaki

22 April 1995 1st-10	Yokohama Flügels	0–3	JEF United Ichihara	Kagoshima Kamoike Stadium
14:02 JST (UTC+09)		J. League	Vasilijević 42'; Nonomura 80'; Fujikawa 89'	Attendance: 10,558; Referee: Kiyoshi Ōta; Assistant referees: Tōru Yamashiro, Hiroyuki Izumi; Fourth official: Shōji Hamada

26 April 1995 1st-11	Gamba Osaka	3–2 (V-goal) (a.e.t.)	Yokohama Flügels	Expo '70 Commemorative Stadium
19:03 JST (UTC+09)	Protassov 72' 108'; Hiraoka 85'	J. League	Mitsuoka 2'; Harada 74'	Attendance: 12,236; Referee: Kenji Tanaka; Assistant referees: Yasuhiro Hemmi, Sōichirō Kaneko; Fourth official: Kazuo Kakihana

29 April 1995 1st-12	Yokohama Flügels	4–3	Nagoya Grampus Eight	Yokohama Mitsuzawa Football Stadium
15:00 JST (UTC+09)	Yoshida 19'; Watanabe 63'; Evair 69'; Zinho 83'	J. League	Ogura 37'; Asano 41'; Kosugi 88'	Attendance: 13,381; Referee: Naotsugu Fuse; Assistant referees: Kazuaki Hamaguchi, Kenichi Koshiyama; Fourth official: Kazuhiko Uchida; Man of the Match: Takayuki Yoshida

3 May 1995 1st-13	Júbilo Iwata	2–1 (V-goal) (a.e.t.)	Yokohama Flügels	Júbilo Iwata Stadium
13:59 JST (UTC+09)	Schillaci 82' (pen.) 90'	J. League	Zinho 75' (pen.)	Attendance: 18,230; Referee: Armando Perez; Assistant referees: Takeshi Ōkura, Takashi Kunori; Fourth official: Tōru Nagata

6 May 1995 1st-14	Yokohama Flügels	1–5	Bellmare Hiratsuka	Kumamoto Suizenji Stadium
14:04 JST (UTC+09)	Zinho 38' (pen.)	J. League	Narahashi 22'; Nakata 41', 60'; Almir 55'; Noguchi 79'	Attendance: 11,608; Referee: Yoshitsugu Katayama; Assistant referees: Tōru Yamashiro, Hiroshi Tanabe; Fourth official: Akira Toyama

10 May 1995 1st-15	Yokohama Marinos	0–0 (V-goal) (a.e.t.) (4–5 p)	Yokohama Flügels	Yokohama Mitsuzawa Football Stadium
19:03 JST (UTC+09)		J. League		Attendance: 13,817; Referee: Lutz Fröhlich; Assistant referees: Toshimitsu Yoshida, Kō Ōishi; Fourth official: Yoshiharu Nakamura; Man of the Match: Sampaio
	Penalties
	(penalty scored) Bisconti; (penalty scored) Terakawa; (penalty missed) Zapata; (penalty scored) T. Suzuki; (penalty scored) Noda		(penalty scored) Zinho; (penalty scored) Maezono; (penalty scored) Harada; (penalty scored) Watanabe; (penalty scored) Yamaguchi

13 May 1995 1st-16	Yokohama Flügels	0–1	Kashiwa Reysol	Nagasaki Stadium
14:03 JST (UTC+09)		J. League	N. Katō 44' (pen.)	Attendance: 11,994; Referee: Masayoshi Okada; Assistant referees: Hideaki Harada, Hiroyuki Izumi; Fourth official: Shigehisa Yamaguchi

17 June 1995 1st-17	Sanfrecce Hiroshima	1–2	Yokohama Flügels	Hiroshima Big Arch
18:31 JST (UTC+09)	Ōki 89'	J. League	Harada 52'; Hattori 83'	Attendance: 15,284; Referee: Armando Perez; Assistant referees: Naoki Esumi, Kōji Minami; Fourth official: Shinya Sasamoto; Man of the Match: Motohiro Yamaguchi

21 June 1995 1st-18	Kashima Antlers	2–3	Yokohama Flügels	Kashima Soccer Stadium
19:04 JST (UTC+09)	Santos 3' (pen.); Kurosaki 15'	J. League	Maezono 56'; Yamaguchi 73'; 89' (o.g.)	Attendance: 15,263; Referee: Juan Carlos Crespi; Assistant referees: Yasuhiro Matsuzaki, Tetsu Karakida; Fourth official: Masao Komada; Man of the Match: Motohiro Yamaguchi

24 June 1995 1st-19	Yokohama Flügels	6–1	Shimizu S-Pulse	Yokohama Mitsuzawa Football Stadium
19:30 JST (UTC+09)	Maeda 26', 55'; Rodrigo 33', 70'; Yamaguchi 44'; Evair 73'	J. League	Dias 69'	Attendance: 13,789; Referee: Yōtarō Moritsu; Assistant referees: Hitoshi Yamada, Kō Ōishi; Fourth official: Ryū Tetsusashi; Man of the Match: Rodrigo

28 June 1995 1st-20	Yokohama Flügels	0–1	Verdy Kawasaki	Toyama Stadium
19:02 JST (UTC+09)		J. League	Takeda 41'	Attendance: 24,521; Referee: Kenji Tanaka; Assistant referees: Hitoshi Yamada, Kōji Taniuchi; Fourth official: Kinji Sakō

1 July 1995 1st-21	Cerezo Osaka	5–3	Yokohama Flügels	Osaka Nagai No.2 Stadium
19:01 JST (UTC+09)	Yamahashi 21', 24'; Valdés 23', 64'; Minamoto 87' (pen.)	J. League	Maeda 44'; Rodrigo 55'; Evair 82'	Attendance: 13,242; Referee: Shinichirō Obata; Assistant referees: Yoshikazu Hiroshima, Mitsuyoshi Nakaguma; Fourth official: Sōichirō Kaneko

8 July 1995 1st-22	JEF United Ichihara	3–2 (V-goal) (a.e.t.)	Yokohama Flügels	Ichihara Stadium
18:33 JST (UTC+09)	Rufer 51'; Ejiri 89'; Niimura 116'	J. League	Maeda 1'; Miura 11'	Attendance: 13,683; Referee: Tatsumi Ōno; Assistant referees: Takeshi Ōkura, Hisaharu Kitamura; Fourth official: Yoshitoshi Watanabe

12 July 1995 1st-23	Yokohama Flügels	1–4	Gamba Osaka	Kagoshima Kamoike Stadium
19:03 JST (UTC+09)	Rodrigo 82'	J. League	Gillhaus 2', 72'; Morioka 44'; Kondō 50'	Attendance: 10,148; Referee: Fumikazu Shioyazono; Assistant referees: Peter Augar, Tōru Kamikawa; Fourth official: Takayuki Kamiyama

15 July 1995 1st-24	Nagoya Grampus Eight	2–1	Yokohama Flügels	Mizuho Rugby Stadium
18:32 JST (UTC+09)	Durix 54'; Moriyama 58'	J. League	Kaetsu 78'	Attendance: 11,139; Referee: Shinichirō Obata; Assistant referees: Naoyuki Mori, Takuji Fukazawa; Fourth official: Yukiyoshi Miyashita

19 July 1995 1st-25	Yokohama Flügels	2–1 (V-goal) (a.e.t.)	Júbilo Iwata	Yokohama Mitsuzawa Football Stadium
19:04 JST (UTC+09)	Kuboyama 30'; Kaetsu 94'	J. League	Schillaci 62'	Attendance: 12,900; Referee: Keiichi Sunakawa; Assistant referees: Kazuhisa Osada, Hisaharu Kitamura; Fourth official: Haruo Suzuki; Man of the Match: Atsuhiro Iwai

22 July 1995 1st-26	Urawa Red Diamonds	2–2 (V-goal) (a.e.t.) (5–3 p)	Yokohama Flügels	Omiya Football Stadium
19:02 JST (UTC+09)	Fukuda 18'; Taguchi 22'	J. League	Miura 13'; Yamaguchi 41' (pen.)	Attendance: 10,354; Referee: Juan Carlos Crespi; Assistant referees: Kazuaki Hamaguchi, Toshimitsu Yoshida; Fourth official: Masahisa Kajiwara
	Penalties
	(penalty scored) Fukuda; (penalty scored) Taguchi; (penalty scored) Hirose; (penalty scored) Yamada; (penalty scored) Buchwald		(penalty scored) Evair; (penalty missed) Miura; (penalty scored) Kuboyama; (penalty scored) Kaetsu

12 August 1995 2nd-1	Yokohama Flügels	0–6	Urawa Red Diamonds	Nagasaki Stadium
19:03 JST (UTC+09)		J. League	6' (o.g.); Buchwald 62'; Fukuda 66' (pen.), 89' (pen.); Toninho 75'; Yamada 77'	Attendance: 11,954; Referee: Hiroyuki Umemoto; Assistant referees: Kōji Minami, Hiroyuki Izumi; Fourth official: Shigehisa Yamaguchi

16 August 1995 2nd-2	Bellmare Hiratsuka	1–2	Yokohama Flügels	Hiratsuka Stadium
19:03 JST (UTC+09)	Betinho 60' (pen.)	J. League	Evair 37'; Zinho 54'	Attendance: 13,189; Referee: Tatsumi Ōno; Assistant referees: Kazuaki Hamaguchi, Kōji Taniuchi; Fourth official: Susumu Takeda; Man of the Match: Atsuhiro Iwai

19 August 1995 2nd-3	Yokohama Flügels	2–1 (V-goal) (a.e.t.)	Yokohama Marinos	Yokohama Mitsuzawa Football Stadium
19:04 JST (UTC+09)	Maezono 89'; Zinho 105'	J. League	Bisconti 64'	Attendance: 14,104; Referee: Keiichi Sunakawa; Assistant referees: Masahiro Katagiri, Satoru Kawano; Fourth official: Yoshio Itō; Man of the Match: Zinho

23 August 1995 2nd-4	Júbilo Iwata	1–2 (V-goal) (a.e.t.)	Yokohama Flügels	Júbilo Iwata Stadium
19:00 JST (UTC+09)	78' (o.g.)	J. League	Evair 2'; Miura 95'	Attendance: 16,832; Referee: Alfredo Trentalange; Assistant referees: Takashi Kunori, Mikio Fukuoka; Fourth official: Toshiaki Futamata; Man of the Match: Seigō Narazaki

26 August 1995 2nd-5	Yokohama Flügels	0–1	JEF United Ichihara	Yokohama Mitsuzawa Football Stadium
19:01 JST (UTC+09)		J. League	Maslovar 72'	Attendance: 12,421; Referee: Yoshimi Ogawa; Assistant referees: Kimio Izaki, Mitsuyoshi Nakaguma; Fourth official: Yoshiharu Nakamura

2 September 1995 2nd-6	Nagoya Grampus Eight	2–1 (V-goal) (a.e.t.)	Yokohama Flügels	Gifu Nagaragawa Stadium
18:30 JST (UTC+09)	Stojković 22'; Durix 92'	J. League	Harada 26'	Attendance: 22,024; Referee: Masayoshi Okada; Assistant referees: Kazuya Yanagisawa, Ichirō Inukai; Fourth official: Tatsuo Gotō

6 September 1995 2nd-7	Yokohama Flügels	1–2	Kashima Antlers	Tokyo National Stadium
19:04 JST (UTC+09)	Evair 76'	J. League	Kurosaki 9'; Jorginho 37'	Attendance: 41,239; Referee: Hideo Kikuchi; Assistant referees: Mitsuru Satō, Toshimitsu Yoshida; Fourth official: Keizō Yamazaki

9 September 1995 2nd-8	Yokohama Flügels	2–1 (V-goal) (a.e.t.)	Gamba Osaka	Yokohama Mitsuzawa Football Stadium
19:03 JST (UTC+09)	12' (o.g.); Zinho 109' (pen.)	J. League	Isogai 24'	Attendance: 11,188; Referee: Zoran Petrović; Assistant referees: Kazuaki Hamaguchi, Kimio Izaki; Fourth official: Katsumi Ishii; Man of the Match: Ippei Watanabe

13 September 1995 2nd-9	Verdy Kawasaki	4–1	Yokohama Flügels	Tokyo National Stadium
19:00 JST (UTC+09)	Kitazawa 8'; Miura 41', 52', 87'	J. League	Zinho 6'	Attendance: 43,279; Referee: Tetsuya Hamana; Assistant referees: Toshiyuki Mayuzumi, Hisaharu Kitamura; Fourth official: Yoshikazu Ozaki

16 September 1995 2nd-10	Yokohama Flügels	0–3	Shimizu S-Pulse	Nagasaki Stadium
19:04 JST (UTC+09)		J. League	Mukōjima 24'; Dias 34', 50'	Attendance: 11,591; Referee: Tatsumi Ōno; Assistant referees: Hiroshi Tanabe, Hideaki Harada; Fourth official: Shigehisa Yamaguchi

23 September 1995 2nd-11	Cerezo Osaka	5–1	Yokohama Flügels	Osaka Nagai No.2 Stadium
15:01 JST (UTC+09)	Marquinhos 59'; Morishima 63'; Kajino 70', 74'; Toninho 81'	J. League	Maezono 27'	Attendance: 10,376; Referee: Kazuo Kakihana; Assistant referees: Yoshikazu Hiroshima, Sōichirō Kaneko; Fourth official: Tsuyoshi Miyake

27 September 1995 2nd-12	Yokohama Flügels	2–1	Kashiwa Reysol	Yokohama Mitsuzawa Football Stadium
19:03 JST (UTC+09)	Evair 68', 71'	J. League	Bentinho 82'	Attendance: 9,617; Referee: Yoshitsugu Katayama; Assistant referees: Noboru Ishiyama, Takuji Fukazawa; Fourth official: Hiroshi Yamaguchi; Man of the Match: Evair

30 September 1995 2nd-13	Sanfrecce Hiroshima	0–1	Yokohama Flügels	Ehime Matsuyama Athletic Stadium
18:34 JST (UTC+09)		J. League	Miura 69'	Attendance: 11,206; Referee: Alfredo Trentalange; Assistant referees: Takashi Kunori, Satoru Kawano; Fourth official: Tatsuya Hyōdō; Man of the Match: Naoto Ōtake

4 October 1995 2nd-14	Yokohama Flügels	1–1 (V-goal) (a.e.t.) (4–5 p)	Bellmare Hiratsuka	Kagoshima Kamoike Stadium
19:04 JST (UTC+09)	Evair 20'	J. League	Simão 47'	Attendance: 11,905; Referee: Masayoshi Okada; Assistant referees: Hideaki Harada, Tetsu Karakida; Fourth official: Shōji Hamada
	Penalties
	(penalty scored) Evair; (penalty missed) Zinho; (penalty scored) Maezono; (penalty scored) Miura; (penalty scored) Yamaguchi; (penalty missed) Sampaio		(penalty scored) Betinho; (penalty scored) Simão; (penalty scored) Takada; (penalty missed) Tasaka; (penalty scored) Watanabe; (penalty scored) Júnior

7 October 1995 2nd-15	Yokohama Marinos	1–0	Yokohama Flügels	Yokohama Mitsuzawa Football Stadium
15:03 JST (UTC+09)	Medina Bello 77'	J. League		Attendance: 12,249; Referee: Yoshimi Ogawa; Assistant referees: Yū Nakamura, Kenichi Koshiyama; Fourth official: Masaki Yoshihara

14 October 1995 2nd-16	Yokohama Flügels	1–3	Júbilo Iwata	Kumamoto Suizenji Stadium
14:03 JST (UTC+09)	Maezono 38'	J. League	Schillaci 11'; Nakayama 24'; Hattori 48' (pen.)	Attendance: 13,409; Referee: Naotsugu Fuse; Assistant referees: Hiroshi Tanabe, Tōru Yamashiro; Fourth official: Kōji Uehara

18 October 1995 2nd-17	JEF United Ichihara	6–3	Yokohama Flügels	Ichihara Stadium
19:03 JST (UTC+09)	Maslovar 24' (pen.), 58'; Nakanishi 72'; Rufer 74', 89', 89'	J. League	Zinho 28'; Evair 31', 40'	Attendance: 8,451; Referee: Armando Perez; Assistant referees: Kazuhisa Osada, Akihisa Makino; Fourth official: Morio Okamoto

21 October 1995 2nd-18	Yokohama Flügels	2–0	Nagoya Grampus Eight	Yokohama Mitsuzawa Football Stadium
15:00 JST (UTC+09)	Miura 45'; Evair 89'	J. League		Attendance: 13,232; Referee: Yoshitsugu Katayama; Assistant referees: Yū Nakamura, Tōru Kamikawa; Fourth official: Mitsune Yamaguchi; Man of the Match: Naoto Ōtake

1 November 1995 2nd-19	Kashima Antlers	5–1	Yokohama Flügels	Kashima Soccer Stadium
19:05 JST (UTC+09)	Sōma 6'; Mazinho 20'; Leonardo 74', 83'; Jorginho 89'	J. League	Takada 71'	Attendance: 15,508; Referee: Fumikazu Shioyazono; Assistant referees: Masahiro Katagiri, Kō Ōishi; Fourth official: Mitsuru Katō

4 November 1995 2nd-20	Gamba Osaka	0–1	Yokohama Flügels	Expo '70 Commemorative Stadium
14:59 JST (UTC+09)		J. League	Evair 74'	Attendance: 11,462; Referee: Armando Perez; Assistant referees: Sōichirō Kaneko, Tōru Kamikawa; Fourth official: Tsuyoshi Miyake; Man of the Match: Masaaki Takada

8 November 1995 2nd-21	Yokohama Flügels	1–4	Verdy Kawasaki	Tokyo National Stadium
19:04 JST (UTC+09)	Harada 7'	J. League	Bismarck 11'; Miura 35', 82'; Takeda 89'	Attendance: 32,876; Referee: Kiyoshi Ōta; Assistant referees: Takashi Kunori, Kenichi Koshiyama; Fourth official: Masao Yamanaka

11 November 1995 2nd-22	Shimizu S-Pulse	0–1	Yokohama Flügels	Nihondaira Sports Stadium
15:05 JST (UTC+09)		J. League	39' (o.g.)	Attendance: 20,145; Referee: Jamal Al-Sharif; Assistant referees: Tetsu Karakida, Hisaharu Kitamura; Fourth official: Masakazu Hōjō; Man of the Match: Rodrigo

15 November 1995 2nd-23	Yokohama Flügels	3–1	Cerezo Osaka	Tokyo National Stadium
19:04 JST (UTC+09)	Yoshida 36'; Zinho 50', 68'	J. League	Morishima 53'	Attendance: 24,570; Referee: Kenji Tanaka; Assistant referees: Yasushi Tsuchimoto, Kazuhisa Osada; Fourth official: Keizō Yamazaki; Man of the Match: Zinho

18 November 1995 2nd-24	Kashiwa Reysol	3–2	Yokohama Flügels	Kashiwa Hitachi Stadium
15:00 JST (UTC+09)	Bentinho 2', 85'; Caio 35'	J. League	Rodrigo 19' (pen.); Zinho 70'	Attendance: 12,478; Referee: Fumikazu Shioyazono; Assistant referees: Mitsuru Satō, Toshimitsu Yoshida; Fourth official: Atsushi Nakamura

22 November 1995 2nd-25	Yokohama Flügels	4–3 (V-goal) (a.e.t.)	Sanfrecce Hiroshima	Yokohama Mitsuzawa Football Stadium
19:04 JST (UTC+09)	Yoshida 35'; Zinho 71', 74'; Mitsuoka 101'	J. League	Huistra 18'; Noh 58'; Moriyasu 83'	Attendance: 9,086; Referee: Armando Perez; Assistant referees: Noboru Ishiyama, Hisaharu Kitamura; Fourth official: Ryū Tetsusashi; Man of the Match: Takeo Harada

25 November 1995 2nd-26	Urawa Red Diamonds	2–1	Yokohama Flügels	Urawa Komaba Stadium
15:04 JST (UTC+09)	Fukuda 75' (pen.); Hori 82'	J. League	Miura 85'	Attendance: 20,591; Referee: Tetsuya Hamana; Assistant referees: Morihisa Yamaguchi, Ichirō Inukai; Fourth official: Akio Hayashi

=== Emperor's Cup ===
3 December 1995 1st Round	Yokohama Flügels	3–2 (V-goal) (a.e.t.)	Tosu Futures	Nagasaki Stadium
: JST (UTC+09)	Evair ?'; Sampaio ?'; Miura ?'		Mori ?'; Taninaka ?'

10 December 1995 2nd Round	Yokohama Flügels	1–4	Nagoya Grampus Eight	Miyagi Athletic Stadium
: JST (UTC+09)	Zinho ?'		Asano ?'; Okayama ?'; Stojković ?'; Hirano ?'

== International results ==
=== Asian Super Cup ===
29 July 1995 1	(Thailand) Thai Farmers Bank	1–1	(Japan) Yokohama Flügels	Suphan buri, Thailand
	? ?'		? ?'

2 August 1995 2	(Japan) Yokohama Flügels	3–2 (4–2 agg.)	(Thailand) Thai Farmers Bank	Yokohama, Japan
	? ?' ? ?' ? ?'		? ?' ? ?'	Stadium: Yokohama Mitsuzawa Football Stadium

=== Asian Cup Winners' Cup ===
1st Round	bye

10 October 1995 2nd Round-1	(Hong Kong) Rangers	1–3	(Japan) Yokohama Flügels	Hong Kong
	? ?'		? ?' ? ?' ? ?'

28 October 1995 2nd Round-2	(Japan) Yokohama Flügels	4–2 (7–3 agg.)	(Hong Kong) Rangers	Tokyo, Japan
	? ?' ? ?' ? ?' ? ?'		? ?' ? ?'	Stadium: Nishigaoka Soccer Stadium

28 November 1995 Quarterfinals-1	(Maldives) New Radiant	0–2	(Japan) Yokohama Flügels	Maldives
			? ?' ? ?'

5 December 1995 Quarterfinals-2	(Japan) Yokohama Flügels	5–0 (7–0 agg.)	(Maldives) New Radiant	Yokohama, Japan
	? ?' ? ?' ? ?' ? ?' ? ?'			Stadium: Yokohama Mitsuzawa Football Stadium

25 December 1995 Semifinals	(Japan) Bellmare Hiratsuka	4–3 (sudden-death) (a.e.t.)	(Japan) Yokohama Flügels	Hiratsuka, Japan
	? ?' ? ?' ? ?' ? ?'		? ?' ? ?' ? ?'	Stadium: Hiratsuka Stadium

== Player statistics ==
Pos.	Nat.	Player	D.o.B. (Age)	Height / Weight	J.League		Emperor's Cup		Dom. Total		Asian Super Cup		Asian Cup Winners' Cup	
Pos.	Nat.	Player	D.o.B. (Age)	Height / Weight	Apps	Goals	Apps	Goals	Apps	Goals	Apps	Goals	Apps	Goals
DF	(Japan)	Hiroshi Hirakawa	January 10, 1965 (aged 30)	179 cm / 78 kg	13	1	0	0	13	1				
FW	(Brazil)	Evair	February 21, 1965 (aged 30)	183 cm / 80 kg	36	15	2	1	38	16				
FW	(Japan)	Osamu Maeda	September 5, 1965 (aged 29)	176 cm / 74 kg	29	8	2	0	31	8				
DF	(Japan)	Hiroki Azuma	July 10, 1966 (aged 28)	179 cm / 75 kg	2	0	0	0	2	0				
DF	(Japan)	Atsuhiro Iwai	January 31, 1967 (aged 28)	177 cm / 66 kg	38	0	0	0	38	0				
MF	(Brazil)	Zinho	June 17, 1967 (aged 27)	172 cm / 71 kg	41	13	2	1	43	14				
MF	(Brazil)	César Sampaio	March 31, 1968 (aged 26)	177 cm / 74 kg	32	0	2	1	34	1				
DF	(Japan)	Naoto Ōtake	October 18, 1968 (aged 26)	178 cm / 72 kg	39	0	2	0	41	0				
MF	(Japan)	Motohiro Yamaguchi	January 29, 1969 (aged 26)	177 cm / 72 kg	41	3	1	0	42	3				
GK	(Japan)	Masahiko Nakagawa	August 26, 1969 (aged 25)	180 cm / 72 kg	0	0	0	0	0	0				
DF	(Japan)	Ippei Watanabe	September 28, 1969 (aged 25)	184 cm / 80 kg	25	1	0	0	25	1				
MF	(Japan)	Hideki Katsura	March 6, 1970 (aged 25)	160 cm / 58 kg	8	0	2	0	10	0				
DF	(Japan)	Kōichi Togashi	July 15, 1971 (aged 23)	183 cm / 77 kg	1	0	0	0	1	0				
FW	(Japan)	Hiroki Hattori	August 30, 1971 (aged 23)	180 cm / 76 kg	23	3	0	0	23	3				
MF	(Japan)	Takeo Harada	October 2, 1971 (aged 23)	173 cm / 72 kg	25	4	2	0	27	4				
GK	(Japan)	Hiroshi Satō	March 7, 1972 (aged 23)	181 cm / 74 kg	2	0	0	0	2	0				
DF	(Japan)	Norihiro Satsukawa	April 18, 1972 (aged 22)	175 cm / 75 kg	14	0	0	0	14	0				
FW	(Japan)	Yoshiyuki Sakamoto	May 30, 1972 (aged 22)	170 cm / 65 kg	0	0								
GK	(Japan)	Atsuhiko Mori	May 31, 1972 (aged 22)	179 cm / 73 kg	27	0	0	0	27	0				
MF	(Japan)	Hideki Yoshioka	June 6, 1972 (aged 22)	178 cm / 72 kg	6	0	0	0	6	0				
GK	(Japan)	Ryōma Sugihara	November 14, 1972 (aged 22)	183 cm / 80 kg	0	0								
MF	(Japan)	Ichizō Nakata	April 19, 1973 (aged 21)	174 cm / 69 kg	8	0	0	0	8	0				
MF	(Japan)	Masaaki Takada	July 26, 1973 (aged 21)	182 cm / 76 kg	17	1	0	0	17	1				
MF/FW	(Japan)	Masakiyo Maezono	October 29, 1973 (aged 21)	170 cm / 63 kg	40	7	2	0	42	7				
DF	(Japan)	Nobuyuki Ōishi	May 23, 1974 (aged 20)	180 cm / 72 kg	2	0	0	0	2	0				
MF	(Japan)	Satoshi Yoneyama	June 27, 1974 (aged 20)	171 cm / 65 kg	18	0	0	0	18	0				
MF	(Japan)	Atsuhiro Miura	July 24, 1974 (aged 20)	174 cm / 68 kg	51	6	2	1	53	7				
DF	(Japan)	Seiichirō Okuno	July 26, 1974 (aged 20)	180 cm / 68 kg	16	0	0	0	16	0				
FW	(Japan)	Hideaki Kaetsu	October 8, 1974 (aged 20)	177 cm / 62 kg	6	2	0	0	6	2				
GK	(Japan)	Seigō Narazaki	April 15, 1976 (aged 18)	185 cm / 76 kg	23	0	2	0	25	0				
FW	(Japan)	Shinya Mitsuoka	April 22, 1976 (aged 18)	176 cm / 67 kg	9	2	1	0	10	2				
FW	(Japan)	Yasuhiro Hato	May 4, 1976 (aged 18)	177 cm / 70 kg	9	0	1	0	10	0				
FW	(Japan)	Yoshikiyo Kuboyama	July 21, 1976 (aged 18)	171 cm / 60 kg	4	1	0	0	4	1				
FW	(Japan)	Takayuki Yoshida	March 14, 1977 (aged 18)	172 cm / 62 kg	28	3	2	0	30	3				
MF	(Brazil)	Rodrigo †	September 10, 1977 (aged 17)	162 cm / 54 kg	22	5	0	0	22	5				
DF	(Japan)	Junji Koizumi †	January 11, 1968 (aged 27)	183 cm / 73 kg	15	0	2	0	17	0				
MF	(Japan)	山竹 操 †	no data	168 cm / 56 kg	0	0								

- † player(s) joined the team after the opening of this season.

== Transfers ==
In:

No.	Pos.	Nation	Player
—	GK	JPN	Ryōma Sugihara (from Seikei University)
—	GK	JPN	Seigō Narazaki (from Nara Ikuei High School)
—	DF	JPN	Hiroshi Hirakawa (from Yokohama Marinos)
—	DF	JPN	Kōichi Togashi (from Verdy Kawasaki)
—	MF	BRA	Zinho (from Palmeiras)
—	MF	BRA	César Sampaio (from Palmeiras)
—	FW	BRA	Evair (from Palmeiras)
—	FW	JPN	Shinya Mitsuoka (from Nihon University Fujisawa Senior High School)
—	FW	JPN	Yasuhiro Hato (from Takigawa Daini Senior High School)
—	FW	JPN	Yoshikiyo Kuboyama (from Shizuoka Gakuen Senior High School)
—	FW	JPN	Takayuki Yoshida (from Takigawa Daini Senior High School)

Out:

No.	Pos.	Nation	Player
—	GK	JPN	Ryūji Ishizue (to Vissel Kobe)
—	DF	ARG	Moner
—	DF	JPN	Tomohiro Irie
—	DF	JPN	Nobuo Maruyama
—	MF	BRA	Edu
—	MF	JPN	Jun Naitō (to Vissel Kobe)
—	MF	BRA	Válber
—	MF	JPN	Akihiko Ichikawa
—	MF	JPN	Makoto Segawa (to Fukushima FC)
—	FW	BRA	Aldro
—	FW	JPN	Takashi Uemura (to Vissel Kobe)
—	FW	JPN	Satoru Ogata

== Transfers during the season ==
=== In ===
- (Brazil) Rodrigo (from Paraná Clube on April)
- (Japan) Junji Koizumi (from Yokohama Marinos)
- (Japan) 山竹 操 (from Shizuoka Gakuen Senior High School)

=== Out ===
- (Japan) Masahiko Nakagawa (to Yokohama Marinos)

== Awards ==
none

== Other pages ==
- (in Japanese) J. League official site
- (in Japanese) Yokohama F. Marinos official web site
