= 1996 Bellmare Hiratsuka season =

Bellmare Hiratsuka
1996 season
- Manager: Toninho Moura; Shigeharu Ueki (acting manager, 20 September 1996 / manager, 27 September 1996)
- Stadium: Hiratsuka Stadium
- J.League: 11th
- Emperor's Cup: Quarterfinals
- J.League Cup: Semifinals
- Asian Super Cup: Runners-up
- Asian Cup Winners' Cup: Quarterfinals
- Top goalscorer: Kōji Noguchi (11)
- Highest home attendance: 12,716 (vs Verdy Kawasaki, 20 March 1996); 31,699 (vs Yokohama Marinos, 11 May 1996, Tokyo National Stadium)
- Lowest home attendance: 5,365 (vs Cerezo Osaka, 16 October 1996)
- Average home league attendance: 10,483
Home colours	Away colours

1996 Bellmare Hiratsuka season

== Review and events ==
=== League results summary ===
Overall								Home						Away					
Pld	W	D	L	GF	GA	GD	Pts	W	D	L	GF	GA	GD	W	D	L	GF	GA	GD
30	12	0	18	47	58	−11	36	6	0	9	20	28	−8	6	0	9	27	30	−3

Source: J.LEAGUE OFFICIAL GUIDE 1997. ISBN 4-09-102329-0.

=== League results by round ===
Round	1	2	3	4	5	6	7	8	9	10	11	12	13	14	15	16	17	18	19	20	21	22	23	24	25	26	27	28	29	30
Ground	A	H	A	H	A	H	A	H	A	H	A	A	H	A	H	H	A	H	A	H	A	H	A	H	A	H	A	H	H	A
Result	L	L	W	W	W	L	L	L	W	L	L	W	L	W	W	L	L	W	L	L	L	L	L	W	L	W	L	L	W	W
Position	11	16	12	10	7	9	10	11	11	14	15	14	14	12	11	11	11	10	11	11	11	12	12	12	12	11	11	11	11	11

Source: J.LEAGUE OFFICIAL GUIDE 1997. ISBN 4-09-102329-0.
A = Away; H = Home; W = Win; D = Draw; L = Loss

== Competitions ==
Competitions	Position
J.League	11th / 16 clubs
Emperor's Cup	Quarterfinals
J.League Cup	Semifinals
Asian Super Cup	Runners-up
Asian Cup Winners' Cup	Quarterfinals

== Domestic results ==
=== J.League ===
16 March 1996 1	Nagoya Grampus Eight	4–1	Bellmare Hiratsuka	Nagoya Mizuho Athletics Stadium
15:03 JST (UTC+09)	Stojković 20'; Kina 47'; Asano 66'; Mochizuki 77'	J.League	Sorimachi 82'	Attendance: 22,021; Referee: Shinichirō Obata; Assistant referees: Morihisa Yamaguchi, Akihisa Makino; Fourth official: Tsuyoshi Ogura

20 March 1996 2	Bellmare Hiratsuka	0–4	Verdy Kawasaki	Hiratsuka Stadium
15:00 JST (UTC+09)		J.League	K. Miura 8'; Donizete 60', 69'; Kitazawa 68'	Attendance: 12,716; Referee: Kiyoshi Ōta; Assistant referees: Satoru Ishizawa, Takuji Fukazawa; Fourth official: Ryū Tetsusashi

23 March 1996 3	JEF United Ichihara	0–2	Bellmare Hiratsuka	Ichihara Stadium
15:01 JST (UTC+09)		J.League	Seki 70'; Noguchi 85'	Attendance: 10,293; Referee: Yoshimi Ogawa; Assistant referees: Kōji Taniuchi, Masaaki Shimomura; Fourth official: Katsuhiko Takayama

30 March 1996 4	Bellmare Hiratsuka	1–0 (V-goal) (a.e.t.)	Kashima Antlers	Tokyo National Stadium
15:00 JST (UTC+09)	Noguchi 109'	J.League		Attendance: 23,748; Referee: Kenji Tanaka; Assistant referees: Takashi Kunori, Keiji Kamiara; Fourth official: Keizō Yamazaki

3 April 1996 5	Cerezo Osaka	2–3 (V-goal) (a.e.t.)	Bellmare Hiratsuka	Osaka Nagai No.2 Stadium
19:01 JST (UTC+09)	Morishima 66', 73'	J.League	Noguchi 29'; Harasaki 39'; 114' (o.g.)	Attendance: 6,389; Referee: Keiichi Sunakawa; Assistant referees: Tōru Yamashiro, Hiroyuki Izumi; Fourth official: Kazuo Kakihana

6 April 1996 6	Bellmare Hiratsuka	0–4	Yokohama Flügels	Hiratsuka Stadium
15:04 JST (UTC+09)		J.League	Evair 6', 79'; 25' (o.g.); Maezono 62'	Attendance: 8,855; Referee: Archundia; Assistant referees: Noboru Ishiyama, Susumu Takeda; Fourth official: Takatoshi Itō

13 April 1996 7	Shimizu S-Pulse	5–1	Bellmare Hiratsuka	Nihondaira Sports Stadium
15:05 JST (UTC+09)	Oliva 24', 55'; Massaro 38', 48', 83'	J.League	Paulinho 57'	Attendance: 14,477; Referee: Hiroyuki Umemoto; Assistant referees: Yū Nakamura, Hiroyuki Ōnishi; Fourth official: Masakazu Hōjō

17 April 1996 8	Bellmare Hiratsuka	0–1 (V-goal) (a.e.t.)	Sanfrecce Hiroshima	Hiratsuka Stadium
19:03 JST (UTC+09)		J.League	Uemura 101'	Attendance: 5,747; Referee: Hiroshi Tanabe; Assistant referees: Mitsuru Satō, Takao Onshi; Fourth official: Masaki Yoshihara

20 April 1996 9	Kyoto Purple Sanga	0–2	Bellmare Hiratsuka	Kyoto Nishikyogoku Stadium
15:04 JST (UTC+09)		J.League	Paulinho 59'; Nakata 81'	Attendance: 6,622; Referee: Keiichi Sunakawa; Assistant referees: Kazuya Yanagisawa, Naoki Esumi; Fourth official: Mitsuyoshi Nakaguma

27 April 1996 10	Bellmare Hiratsuka	0–1	Kashiwa Reysol	Hiratsuka Stadium
15:01 JST (UTC+09)		J.League	Katanosaka 6'	Attendance: 9,229; Referee: Yasuhiro Matsuzaki; Assistant referees: Ichirō Inukai, Masaaki Shimomura; Fourth official: Michio Nakahara

1 May 1996 11	Gamba Osaka	2–1 (V-goal) (a.e.t.)	Bellmare Hiratsuka	Expo '70 Commemorative Stadium
19:00 JST (UTC+09)	Matsunami 3'; Kitamura 110'	J.League	Noguchi 31'	Attendance: 7,153; Referee: Shinichirō Obata; Assistant referees: Morihisa Yamaguchi, Kazuhiko Matsumura; Fourth official: Tamotsu Ōnishi

4 May 1996 12	Avispa Fukuoka	0–4	Bellmare Hiratsuka	Hakatanomori Football Stadium
15:04 JST (UTC+09)		J.League	Harasaki 2', 19'; Noguchi 12'; Simão 86'	Attendance: 11,286; Referee: Yoshimi Ogawa; Assistant referees: Kazuya Yanagisawa, Takashi Aoki; Fourth official: Daikichi Kanada

11 May 1996 13	Bellmare Hiratsuka	0–2	Yokohama Marinos	Tokyo National Stadium
18:34 JST (UTC+09)		J.League	Miura 44'; Bisconti 78'	Attendance: 31,699; Referee: Archundia; Assistant referees: Hisaharu Kitamura, Hitoshi Nakagomi; Fourth official: Tsutomu Anazawa

15 May 1996 14	Júbilo Iwata	3–4	Bellmare Hiratsuka	Júbilo Iwata Stadium
19:00 JST (UTC+09)	Schillaci 57', 83', 89'	J.League	Simão 3'; Betinho 49', 55', 81'	Attendance: 11,924; Referee: Hiroshi Tanabe; Assistant referees: Morihisa Yamaguchi, Yasushi Tsuchimoto; Fourth official: Takuya Okada

18 May 1996 15	Bellmare Hiratsuka	5–3	Urawa Red Diamonds	Niigata Stadium
18:01 JST (UTC+09)	T. Iwamoto 41', 76'; Narahashi 64'; Simão 79'; Noguchi 83'	J.League	Okano 10', 39'; Fukuda 30'	Attendance: 12,337; Referee: Yasuhiro Hemmi; Assistant referees: Kōji Taniuchi, Masaaki Shimomura; Fourth official: Naoki Nakamura

28 August 1996 16	Bellmare Hiratsuka	1–4	Avispa Fukuoka	Hiratsuka Stadium
19:00 JST (UTC+09)	Nakata 85'	J.League	Endō 22'; Maradona 55'; Sonoda 67'; Troglio 77'	Attendance: 5,539; Referee: Yoshitsugu Katayama; Assistant referees: Kazuaki Hamaguchi, Takayoshi Kashino; Fourth official: Kazuhiko Uchida

31 August 1996 17	Yokohama Marinos	2–1	Bellmare Hiratsuka	Yokohama Mitsuzawa Football Stadium
19:07 JST (UTC+09)	Acosta 28'; Omura 78'	J.League	Simão 44'	Attendance: 13,978; Referee: Shinichirō Obata; Assistant referees: Kimio Izaki, Susumu Takeda; Fourth official: Toshiya Kumagai

7 September 1996 18	Bellmare Hiratsuka	3–0	Júbilo Iwata	Hiratsuka Stadium
19:04 JST (UTC+09)	Seki 49', 70'; Almir 82'	J.League		Attendance: 8,015; Referee: Naotsugu Fuse; Assistant referees: Satoru Ishizawa, Keiji Kamiara; Fourth official: Jōji Kashihara

14 September 1996 19	Urawa Red Diamonds	3–2	Bellmare Hiratsuka	Urawa Komaba Stadium
18:34 JST (UTC+09)	Okano 35'; Ōshiba 63'; Hori 86'	J.League	Seki 44'; Almir 59'	Attendance: 17,825; Referee: Lim Kee Chong; Assistant referees: Morihisa Yamaguchi, Ichirō Inukai; Fourth official: Shigeru Kimura

21 September 1996 20	Bellmare Hiratsuka	2–3 (V-goal) (a.e.t.)	Nagoya Grampus Eight	Hiratsuka Stadium
15:01 JST (UTC+09)	Seki 44'; Betinho 88'	J.League	Okayama 8', 41' 104'	Attendance: 7,537; Referee: Hideo Kikuchi; Assistant referees: Masahiro Katagiri, Kenichi Koshiyama; Fourth official: Hiroshi Yamaguchi

28 September 1996 21	Verdy Kawasaki	1–0	Bellmare Hiratsuka	Tokyo National Stadium
19:02 JST (UTC+09)	K. Miura 12'	J.League		Attendance: 27,001; Referee: Bemard Saules; Assistant referees: Yū Nakamura, Masaaki Shimomura; Fourth official: Noritake Sakurada

2 October 1996 22	Bellmare Hiratsuka	0–4	JEF United Ichihara	Hiratsuka Stadium
19:03 JST (UTC+09)		J.League	Hašek 31', 35'; Mutō 38'; Jō 40'	Attendance: 6,010; Referee: Masayoshi Okada; Assistant referees: Tetsu Karakida, Takao Onshi; Fourth official: Junichi Sasaki

5 October 1996 23	Kashima Antlers	2–0	Bellmare Hiratsuka	Kashima Soccer Stadium
15:00 JST (UTC+09)	Manaka 62', 86'	J.League		Attendance: 15,931; Referee: Zoran Petrović; Assistant referees: Hiroshi Fukuda, Masahiro Katagiri; Fourth official: Osamu Asano

16 October 1996 24	Bellmare Hiratsuka	3–1	Cerezo Osaka	Hiratsuka Stadium
19:03 JST (UTC+09)	Noguchi 35', 54'; Seki 72'	J.League	Nishizawa 49'	Attendance: 5,365; Referee: Kazuo Kakihana; Assistant referees: Toshiyuki Mayuzumi, Takayoshi Kashino; Fourth official: Ryū Tetsusashi

19 October 1996 25	Yokohama Flügels	1–0	Bellmare Hiratsuka	Yokohama Mitsuzawa Football Stadium
15:01 JST (UTC+09)	Yamaguchi 25'	J.League		Attendance: 10,348; Referee: Kiyoshi Ōta; Assistant referees: Naoki Esumi, Masaaki Shimomura; Fourth official: Hiroshi Yamaguchi

26 October 1996 26	Bellmare Hiratsuka	3–0	Shimizu S-Pulse	Hiratsuka Stadium
15:03 JST (UTC+09)	Noguchi 18'; 67' (o.g.); Betinho 89'	J.League		Attendance: 8,240; Referee: Hideo Kikuchi; Assistant referees: Masahiro Katagiri, Ichirō Inukai; Fourth official: Yasuhiro Mineshita

30 October 1996 27	Sanfrecce Hiroshima	3–2	Bellmare Hiratsuka	Hiroshima Stadium
19:01 JST (UTC+09)	Takagi 11'; Huistra 30'; Kojima 52'	J.League	Takada 19'; Noguchi 86'	Attendance: 5,037; Referee: Tatsumi Ōno; Assistant referees: Hideaki Harada, Hiroyuki Ōnishi; Fourth official: Kuniyasu Doi

2 November 1996 28	Bellmare Hiratsuka	0–1	Kyoto Purple Sanga	Hiratsuka Stadium
15:03 JST (UTC+09)		J.League	Edmílson 62'	Attendance: 5,874; Referee: Zoran Petrović; Assistant referees: Yasushi Tsuchimoto, Akihisa Makino; Fourth official: Yoshihiko Tamura

6 November 1996 29	Bellmare Hiratsuka	2–0	Gamba Osaka	Hiratsuka Stadium
19:00 JST (UTC+09)	8' (o.g.); Noguchi 88'	J.League		Attendance: 6,335; Referee: Keiichi Sunakawa; Assistant referees: Kenichi Koshiyama, Masaaki Shimomura; Fourth official: Jun Hirayama

9 November 1996 30	Kashiwa Reysol	2–4	Bellmare Hiratsuka	Hitachi Kashiwa Soccer Stadium
14:30 JST (UTC+09)	Careca 76'; Date 85'	J.League	47' (o.g.); T. Iwamoto 48'; Betinho 58', 74'	Attendance: 12,126; Referee: Bemard Saules; Assistant referees: Yū Nakamura, Takao Onshi; Fourth official: Fujirō Masukura

=== Emperor's Cup ===
1st Round	bye

2nd Round	bye

17 November 1996 3rd Round	Bellmare Hiratsuka	1–0	Tosu Futures	Toyama Stadium
: JST (UTC+09)	? (?)

23 December 1996 4th Round	Bellmare Hiratsuka	3–1	Cosmo Oil	Kagoshima Kamoike Stadium
: JST (UTC+09)	? (?) ? (?) ? (?)		? (?)

26 December 1996 Quarterfinals	Urawa Red Diamonds	3–0	Bellmare Hiratsuka	Nagoya Mizuho Athletics Stadium
19:01 JST (UTC+09)	Hori 28'; Bein 66'; Yamada 76'			Attendance: 2,774; Referee: Shinichirō Obata

=== J.League Cup ===
1 June 1996 GL-A-1-1	Kyoto Purple Sanga	1–1	Bellmare Hiratsuka	Kyoto Nishikyogoku Stadium
18:36 JST (UTC+09)	Raudnei 33'	J.League	Seki 64'	Attendance: 9,254; Referee: Zoran Petrović; Assistant referees: Kazuaki Hamaguchi, Takashi Aoki; Fourth official: Hiroyuki Ishida

5 June 1996 GL-A-1-2	Bellmare Hiratsuka	3–1 (4–2 agg.)	Kyoto Purple Sanga	Hiratsuka Stadium
19:04 JST (UTC+09)	T. Iwamoto 3'; Seki 50'; Natsuka 69'	J.League	Raudnei 23'	Attendance: 8,107; Referee: Archundia; Assistant referees: Kimio Izaki, Satoru Ishizawa; Fourth official: Jōji Kashihara

8 June 1996 GL-A-2-1	Urawa Red Diamonds	0–0	Bellmare Hiratsuka	Urawa Komaba Stadium
18:33 JST (UTC+09)		J.League		Attendance: 19,287; Referee: Hiroyuki Umemoto; Assistant referees: Naoki Esumi, Susumu Takeda; Fourth official: Izumi Okada

12 June 1996 GL-A-2-2	Bellmare Hiratsuka	1–2 (1–2 agg.)	Urawa Red Diamonds	Hiratsuka Stadium
19:01 JST (UTC+09)	Betinho 36'	J.League	Boli 50'; Fukuda 78' (pen.)	Attendance: 7,893; Referee: Keiichi Sunakawa; Assistant referees: Noboru Ishiyama, Kenichi Koshiyama; Fourth official: Takatoshi Itō

15 June 1996 GL-A-3-1	Bellmare Hiratsuka	1–1	Yokohama Marinos	Hiratsuka Stadium
18:30 JST (UTC+09)	Nakata 66'	J.League	Bisconti 67'	Attendance: 10,451; Referee: Piotr Werner; Assistant referees: Toshiyuki Mayuzumi, Keiji Kamiara; Fourth official: Hiroshi Yamaguchi

19 June 1996 GL-A-3-2	Yokohama Marinos	0–3 (1–4 agg.)	Bellmare Hiratsuka	Yokohama Mitsuzawa Football Stadium
19:00 JST (UTC+09)		J.League	T. Iwamoto 8'; Paulinho 53', 57'	Attendance: 8,717; Referee: Zoran Petrović; Assistant referees: Morihisa Yamaguchi, Ichirō Inukai; Fourth official: Kazuo Shirato

22 June 1996 GL-A-4-1	Bellmare Hiratsuka	1–3	Júbilo Iwata	Hiratsuka Stadium
18:30 JST (UTC+09)	Natsuka 89'	J.League	Vanenburg 50'; Takeda 76'; Nakayama 82'	Attendance: 10,069; Referee: Kazuo Kakihana; Assistant referees: Mitsuru Satō, Kazuhiko Matsumura; Fourth official: Kazuhiko Uchida

26 June 1996 GL-A-4-2	Júbilo Iwata	2–1 (5–2 agg.)	Bellmare Hiratsuka	Júbilo Iwata Stadium
19:02 JST (UTC+09)	9' (o.g.); Hattori 89'	J.League	Paulinho 66'	Attendance: 8,696; Referee: Yasuhiro Matsuzaki; Assistant referees: Kazuaki Hamaguchi, Tetsu Karakida; Fourth official: Takuya Okada

29 June 1996 GL-A-5-1	Sanfrecce Hiroshima	2–3	Bellmare Hiratsuka	Hiroshima Big Arch
18:31 JST (UTC+09)	Kubo 33'; Huistra 58'	J.League	Paulinho 19'; Seki 81', 89'	Attendance: 7,470; Referee: Hiroyuki Umemoto; Assistant referees: Akio Okutani, Takuji Fukazawa; Fourth official: Kuniyasu Doi

3 July 1996 GL-A-5-2	Bellmare Hiratsuka	3–0 (6–2 agg.)	Sanfrecce Hiroshima	Hiratsuka Stadium
19:01 JST (UTC+09)	Seki 15', 51'; Paulinho 83'	J.League		Attendance: 7,178; Referee: Piotr Werner; Assistant referees: Hiroshi Fukuda, Susumu Takeda; Fourth official: Hiroshi Yamaguchi

10 August 1996 GL-A-6-1	Gamba Osaka	1–1	Bellmare Hiratsuka	Expo '70 Commemorative Stadium
19:00 JST (UTC+09)	Gillhaus 50'	J.League	Simão 36'	Attendance: 5,730; Referee: Yoshitsugu Katayama; Assistant referees: Kazuya Yanagisawa, Takashi Aoki; Fourth official: Tsuyoshi Miyake

14 August 1996 GL-A-6-2	Bellmare Hiratsuka	0–0 (1–1 agg.)	Gamba Osaka	Hiratsuka Stadium
19:00 JST (UTC+09)		J.League		Attendance: 6,709; Referee: Hideo Kikuchi; Assistant referees: Kimio Izaki, Tetsu Karakida; Fourth official: Kazuhiko Uchida

17 August 1996 GL-A-7-1	Bellmare Hiratsuka	3–1	Kashiwa Reysol	Hiratsuka Stadium
18:31 JST (UTC+09)	Nakata 12'; Seki 35'; Narahashi 63'	J.League	Edílson 82'	Attendance: 8,070; Referee: Bemard Saules; Assistant referees: Mitsuru Satō, Naoyuki Mori; Fourth official: Takeshi Ōgiya

21 August 1996 GL-A-7-2	Kashiwa Reysol	1–2 (2–5 agg.)	Bellmare Hiratsuka	Hitachi Kashiwa Soccer Stadium
19:00 JST (UTC+09)	Sakai 7'	J.League	Seki 44'; Noguchi 60'	Attendance: 7,572; Referee: Zoran Petrović; Assistant referees: Kazuhisa Osada, Hitoshi Nakagomi; Fourth official: Eita Horikawa

4 September 1996 Semifinals	Shimizu S-Pulse	5–0	Bellmare Hiratsuka	Nihondaira Sports Stadium
19:03 JST (UTC+09)	Oliva 15', 22'; Ōenoki 18'; Hasegawa 56'; T. Itō 84'	J.League		Attendance: 13,629; Referee: Lim Kee Chong; Assistant referees: Morihisa Yamaguchi, Kazuya Yanagisawa; Fourth official: Hiroyuki Umemoto

== International results ==
=== Asian Super Cup ===
31 July 1996 1	(South Korea) Ilhwa Chunma	5–3	(Japan) Bellmare Hiratsuka	Masan, Korea Rep.
	? (?) ? (?) ? (?) ? (?) ? (?)		Tasaka (?); Noguchi (?); Narahashi (?)

7 August 1996 2	(Japan) Bellmare Hiratsuka	0–1 (3–6 agg.)	(South Korea) Ilhwa Chunma	Hiratsuka, Japan
			Shin Tae-Yong (?)	Stadium: Hiratsuka Stadium

=== Asian Cup Winners' Cup ===
1st Round	bye

2nd Round-1	(Maldives) Valencia	bye	(Japan) Bellmare Hiratsuka

18 September 1996 2nd Round-2	(Japan) Bellmare Hiratsuka	7–0 (7–0 agg.)	(Maldives) Valencia	Hiratsuka, Japan
	Omoto (?); Natsuka (?); Betinho (?); Narahashi (?); Noguchi (?)			Stadium: Hiratsuka Stadium; Attendance: 3,193

9 October 1996 Quarterfinals-1	(Japan) Bellmare Hiratsuka	1–0	(South Korea) Ulsan Hyundai	Hiratsuka, Japan
	Luis (?)			Stadium: Hiratsuka Stadium; Attendance: 4,131

23 October 1996 Quarterfinals-2	(South Korea) Ulsan Hyundai	2–0 (2–1 agg.)	(Japan) Bellmare Hiratsuka	Ulsan, Korea Rep.
	? (?) ? (?)			Stadium: Ulsan Stadium

== Player statistics ==
Pos.	Nat.	Player	D.o.B. (Age)	Height / Weight	J.League		Emperor's Cup		J.League Cup		Dom. Total		Asian Super Cup		Asian Cup Winners' Cup	
Pos.	Nat.	Player	D.o.B. (Age)	Height / Weight	Apps	Goals	Apps	Goals	Apps	Goals	Apps	Goals	Apps	Goals	Apps	Goals
FW	(Brazil)	Paulinho	September 28, 1963 (aged 32)	180 cm / 78 kg	10	2	0	0	7	5	17	7		0		0
MF	(Japan)	Yasuharu Sorimachi	March 8, 1964 (aged 32)	173 cm / 64 kg	14	1	1	0	1	0	16	1		0		0
GK	(Japan)	Nobuyuki Kojima	January 17, 1966 (aged 30)	187 cm / 85 kg	29	0	3	0	15	0	47	0		0		0
DF	(Japan)	Fujio Yamamoto	May 27, 1966 (aged 29)	179 cm / 72 kg	10	0	0	0	4	0	14	0		0		0
MF	(Brazil)	Betinho	June 14, 1966 (aged 29)	172 cm / 70 kg	28	7	3	1	14	1	45	9		0		1
DF	(Japan)	Hiroaki Kumon	October 20, 1966 (aged 29)	169 cm / 65 kg	10	0	1	0	14	0	25	0		0		0
MF	(Brazil)	Simão	October 23, 1968 (aged 27)	182 cm / 70 kg	15	4	2	0	15	1	32	5		0		0
FW	(Japan)	Tadateru Ōmoto	April 6, 1969 (aged 26)	173 cm / 70 kg	3	0	0	0	2	0	5	0		0		2
MF	(Japan)	Tetsuya Takada	July 31, 1969 (aged 26)	178 cm / 72 kg	12	1	3	0	0	0	15	1		0		0
DF	(Japan)	Yoshihiro Natsuka	October 7, 1969 (aged 26)	182 cm / 72 kg	14	0	0	0	13	2	27	2		0		1
FW	(Japan)	Kōji Noguchi	June 5, 1970 (aged 25)	177 cm / 68 kg	27	11	3	1	10	1	40	13		1		2
MF	(Japan)	Hironari Iwamoto	June 27, 1970 (aged 25)	166 cm / 65 kg	7	0	1	0	0	0	8	0		0		0
DF	(Japan)	Hiroshi Miyazawa	November 22, 1970 (aged 25)	184 cm / 79 kg	24	0	3	0	14	0	41	0		0		0
MF	(Japan)	Kazuaki Tasaka	August 3, 1971 (aged 24)	173 cm / 68 kg	30	0	3	0	15	0	48	0		1		0
DF	(Japan)	Akira Narahashi	November 26, 1971 (aged 24)	170 cm / 72 kg	29	1	3	0	14	1	46	2		1		1
DF	(Japan)	Teruo Iwamoto	May 2, 1972 (aged 23)	178 cm / 70 kg	17	3	3	0	9	2	29	5		0		0
FW	(Japan)	Kōji Seki	June 26, 1972 (aged 23)	176 cm / 70 kg	21	6	3	1	15	8	39	15		0		0
MF	(Japan)	Tomoaki Matsukawa	April 18, 1973 (aged 22)	172 cm / 60 kg	6	0	0	0	0	0	6	0		0		0
GK	(Japan)	Makoto Kakegawa	May 23, 1973 (aged 22)	191 cm / 78 kg	0	0		0	0	0		0		0		0
GK	(Japan)	Hitoshi Sasaki	July 9, 1973 (aged 22)	178 cm / 75 kg	1	0	0	0	0	0	1	0		0		0
DF	(Brazil)	Luis	September 23, 1973 (aged 22)	185 cm / 77 kg	12	0	0	0	3	0	15	0		0		1
FW	(Japan)	Yoshiya Takemura	December 6, 1973 (aged 22)	166 cm / 61 kg	1	0	0	0	0	0	1	0		0		0
MF	(Japan)	Kazuyuki Takahashi	May 10, 1974 (aged 21)	168 cm / 62 kg	0	0		0	0	0		0		0		0
MF	(Japan)	Masato Harasaki	August 13, 1974 (aged 21)	178 cm / 70 kg	17	3	0	0	7	0	24	3		0		0
MF	(Japan)	Teppei Nishiyama	February 22, 1975 (aged 21)	176 cm / 69 kg	3	0	0	0	5	0	8	0		0		0
GK	(Japan)	Akihiro Yoshida	May 28, 1975 (aged 20)	183 cm / 75 kg	0	0		0	0	0		0		0		0
DF	(Japan)	Masahiro Kuzuno	July 2, 1975 (aged 20)	180 cm / 73 kg	0	0		0	0	0		0		0		0
FW	(Japan)	Hiroshi Sakai	October 19, 1976 (aged 19)	178 cm / 66 kg	0	0		0	0	0		0		0		0
MF	(Japan)	Hidetoshi Nakata	January 22, 1977 (aged 19)	175 cm / 67 kg	26	2	3	0	12	2	41	4		0		0
MF	(Japan)	Takayasu Kawai	March 7, 1977 (aged 19)	175 cm / 60 kg	3	0	0	0	0	0	3	0		0		0
DF	(Japan)	Kenji Takeichi †	June 25, 1977 (aged 18)	-cm / -kg	0	0		0	0	0		0		0		0
FW	(Japan)	Atsushi Hirano †	April 5, 1977 (aged 18)	-cm / -kg	0	0		0	0	0		0		0		0
FW	(Brazil)	Almir †	March 26, 1969 (aged 26)	-cm / -kg	9	2	3	1	0	0	12	3		0		0

- † player(s) joined the team after the opening of this season.

== Transfers ==
In:

No.	Pos.	Nation	Player
—	GK	JPN	Makoto Kakegawa (from Tokai University)
—	DF	JPN	Hiroshi Miyazawa (from JEF United Ichihara)
—	MF	BRA	Jose Luis Drey (from Atlético Sorocaba)
—	MF	JPN	Tomoaki Matsukawa (from Komazawa University)
—	FW	BRA	Paulinho (from Cruzeiro)
—	FW	JPN	Kōji Seki (from Tokyo Gas)

Out:

No.	Pos.	Nation	Player
—	GK	JPN	Kiyoto Furushima (to Avispa Fukuoka)
—	DF	JPN	Katsuyoshi Shintō (retired)
—	DF	JPN	Taku Watanabe (to Cerezo Osaka)
—	DF	JPN	Keisuke Nakagawa (to Blaze Kumamoto)
—	DF	BRA	Júnior (to Tokyo Gas)
—	MF	BRA	Edson
—	MF	JPN	Hiroaki Matsuyama (to Toshiba)
—	MF	JPN	Daichi Matsuyama (to Toshiba)
—	MF	JPN	Jin Hiroi
—	FW	JPN	Hirokazu Ōta (to Cosmo Oil)
—	FW	JPN	Seiichi Igarashi
—	FW	JPN	Takaaki Nakamura (retired)
—	FW	BRA	Émerson

== Transfers during the season ==
=== In ===
- (Japan) Kenji Takeichi (from Bellmare Hiratsuka youth)
- (Japan) Atsushi Hirano (from Bellmare Hiratsuka youth)
- (Brazil) Almir (on August)

== Awards ==
none

== Other pages ==
- (in Japanese) J.League official site
- (in Japanese) Shonan Bellmare official website
