= 1995 Bellmare Hiratsuka season =

Bellmare Hiratsuka
1995 season
- Manager: Mitsuru Komaeda; Shigeharu Ueki (acting manager, November 1995)
- Stadium: Hiratsuka Stadium
- J.League: 11th
- Emperor's Cup: 2nd Round
- Super Cup: Runners-up
- Asian Cup Winners' Cup: Champions
- Top goalscorer: Betinho (25)
- Highest home attendance: 16,082 (vs Verdy Kawasaki, 22 July 1995); 44,152 (vs Yokohama Marinos, 15 April 1995, Tokyo National Stadium)
- Lowest home attendance: 8,320 (vs Gamba Osaka, 8 November 1995)
- Average home league attendance: 16,111
Home colours	Away colours

1995 Bellmare Hiratsuka season

== Review and events ==
=== League results summary ===
Overall								Home						Away					
Pld	W	D	L	GF	GA	GD	Pts	W	D	L	GF	GA	GD	W	D	L	GF	GA	GD
52	21	0	31	94	102	−8	65	9	0	17	52	56	−4	12	0	14	42	46	−4

Source: J.LEAGUE OFFICIAL RECORD & DATA 1996. ISBN 4-09-102323-1.

=== League results by round ===
J.League Suntory series (first stage)
Round	1	2	3	4	5	6	7	8	9	10	11	12	13	14	15	16	17	18	19	20	21	22	23	24	25	26
Ground	A	H	A	H	A	A	H	A	H	A	H	A	H	A	H	A	H	H	A	H	A	H	A	H	A	H
Result	L	L	W	L	W	W	W	W	L	W	L	W	W	W	L	W	L	W	L	L	W	W	L	W	L	L
Position	8	13	7	11	8	7	4	4	5	4	7	4	3	3	3	3	3	3	4	5	4	3	5	4	5	7

Source: J.LEAGUE OFFICIAL RECORD & DATA 1996. ISBN 4-09-102323-1.
A = Away; H = Home; W = Win; D = Draw; L = Loss

J.League NICOS series (second stage)
Round	1	2	3	4	5	6	7	8	9	10	11	12	13	14	15	16	17	18	19	20	21	22	23	24	25	26
Ground	A	H	A	H	A	H	A	H	A	A	H	A	H	A	H	A	H	A	H	A	H	H	A	H	A	H
Result	L	L	L	W	L	W	L	L	L	L	L	L	W	W	L	L	L	L	L	L	L	L	W	L	W	W
Position	11	13	13	13	14	10	12	12	13	13	14	14	12	12	13	13	13	14	14	14	14	14	14	14	14	14

Source: J.LEAGUE OFFICIAL RECORD & DATA 1996. ISBN 4-09-102323-1.
A = Away; H = Home; W = Win; D = Draw; L = Loss

== Competitions ==
Competitions	Position
J.League	11th / 14 clubs
Emperor's Cup	2nd round
Super Cup	Runners-up
Asian Cup Winners' Cup	Champions

== Domestic results ==
=== J.League ===
18 March 1995 1st-1	Verdy Kawasaki	0–0 (V-goal) (a.e.t.) (7–6 p)	Bellmare Hiratsuka	Tokyo National Stadium
19:05 JST (UTC+09)		J. League		Attendance: 48,103; Referee: Lutz Fröhlich; Assistant referees: Yasuhiro Matsuzaki, Tetsu Karakida; Fourth official: Keizō Yamazaki
	Penalties
	(penalty scored) Bismarck; (penalty scored) Alcindo; (penalty missed) Hashiratani; (penalty missed) Kitazawa; (penalty scored) Pereira; (penalty scored) Takeda; (penalty scored) Nakamura; (penalty scored) Hasebe; (penalty scored) Ishikawa		(penalty scored) Betinho; (penalty scored) Noguchi; (penalty missed) Tasaka; (penalty missed) Natsuka; (penalty scored) Edson; (penalty scored) Narahashi; (penalty scored) Watanabe; (penalty scored) Yamamoto; (penalty missed) Nishiyama

22 March 1995 1st-2	Bellmare Hiratsuka	0–3	Yokohama Flügels	Hiratsuka Stadium
19:04 JST (UTC+09)		J. League	Maezono 4'; Evair 80'; Maeda 82'	Attendance: 13,305; Referee: Hideo Kikuchi; Assistant referees: Toshiyuki Mayuzumi, Takayoshi Kashino; Fourth official: Masaki Yoshihara

25 March 1995 1st-3	JEF United Ichihara	2–3	Bellmare Hiratsuka	Ichihara Stadium
15:01 JST (UTC+09)	Nakanishi 28'; Maslovar 30'	J. League	Takada 48'; Narahashi 75'; Noguchi 83'	Attendance: 11,895; Referee: Naotsugu Fuse; Assistant referees: Masahiro Katagiri, Ichirō Inukai; Fourth official: Terunobu Kakinuma; Man of the Match: Kōji Noguchi

29 March 1995 1st-4	Bellmare Hiratsuka	3–5	Gamba Osaka	Hiratsuka Stadium
19:00 JST (UTC+09)	Betinho 8', 29'; Noguchi 26'	J. League	Isogai 16' (pen.), 29'; Protassov 62', 68'; Aleinikov 77'	Attendance: 11,540; Referee: Yoshimi Ogawa; Assistant referees: Yasushi Tsuchimoto, Takuji Fukazawa; Fourth official: Ryū Tetsusashi

1 April 1995 1st-5	Nagoya Grampus Eight	0–1 (V-goal) (a.e.t.)	Bellmare Hiratsuka	Nagoya Mizuho Athletics Stadium
14:03 JST (UTC+09)		J. League	Sorimachi 109'	Attendance: 20,509; Referee: Tatsumi Ōno; Assistant referees: Masahiro Katagiri, Yasuhiro Hemmi; Fourth official: Tsuyoshi Ogura; Man of the Match: Yasuharu Sorimachi

5 April 1995 1st-6	Urawa Red Diamonds	0–1	Bellmare Hiratsuka	Omiya Football Stadium
19:02 JST (UTC+09)		J. League	Almir 83'	Attendance: 9,630; Referee: Lutz Fröhlich; Assistant referees: Noboru Ishiyama, Toshimitsu Yoshida; Fourth official: Shigeru Kimura; Man of the Match: Almir

8 April 1995 1st-7	Bellmare Hiratsuka	2–0	Júbilo Iwata	Hiratsuka Stadium
15:02 JST (UTC+09)	Betinho 7'; Almir 48'	J. League		Attendance: 14,630; Referee: Fumikazu Shioyazono; Assistant referees: Tetsu Karakida, Hisaharu Kitamura; Fourth official: Jōji Kashihara; Man of the Match: Nobuyuki Kojima

12 April 1995 1st-8	Cerezo Osaka	1–2	Bellmare Hiratsuka	Osaka Nagai No.2 Stadium
19:00 JST (UTC+09)	Kizawa 26'	J. League	Noguchi 31'; Betinho 60'	Attendance: 9,346; Referee: Shinichirō Obata; Assistant referees: Kazuo Kakihana, Mitsuyoshi Nakaguma; Fourth official: Akio Okutani; Man of the Match: Betinho

15 April 1995 1st-9	Bellmare Hiratsuka	0–2	Yokohama Marinos	Tokyo National Stadium
19:03 JST (UTC+09)		J. League	Koizumi 49'; Koga 87'	Attendance: 44,152; Referee: Kiyoshi Ōta; Assistant referees: Kazuaki Hamaguchi, Akihisa Makino; Fourth official: Masao Yamanaka

22 April 1995 1st-10	Kashiwa Reysol	1–2 (V-goal) (a.e.t.)	Bellmare Hiratsuka	Kashiwa Hitachi Stadium
15:01 JST (UTC+09)	Ishikawa 63'	J. League	Betinho 23' 100' (pen.)	Attendance: 13,413; Referee: Armando Perez; Assistant referees: Hiroshi Fukuda, Kō Ōishi; Fourth official: Katsuhiko Takayama; Man of the Match: Betinho

26 April 1995 1st-11	Bellmare Hiratsuka	2–3	Sanfrecce Hiroshima	Hiratsuka Stadium
19:03 JST (UTC+09)	Edson 13'; Betinho 25'	J. League	Uemura 10'; Michiki 23'; Van Loen 76'	Attendance: 11,337; Referee: Juan Carlos Crespi; Assistant referees: Takashi Kunori, Ichirō Inukai; Fourth official: Junichi Takahashi

29 April 1995 1st-12	Shimizu S-Pulse	1–4	Bellmare Hiratsuka	Nihondaira Sports Stadium
15:03 JST (UTC+09)	Nagashima 46'	J. League	Edson 28'; Tasaka 39'; Betinho 80'; Almir 88'	Attendance: 18,322; Referee: Yoshimi Ogawa; Assistant referees: Mikio Fukuoka, Tetsu Karakida; Fourth official: Toshiyuki Asanuma; Man of the Match: Edson

3 May 1995 1st-13	Bellmare Hiratsuka	7–0	Kashima Antlers	Hiratsuka Stadium
15:00 JST (UTC+09)	Nakata 35'; Noguchi 53', 65', 71', 73', 85'; Betinho 69'	J. League		Attendance: 15,709; Referee: Lutz Fröhlich; Assistant referees: Kazuaki Hamaguchi, Takayoshi Kashino; Fourth official: Mitsune Yamaguchi; Man of the Match: Kōji Noguchi

6 May 1995 1st-14	Yokohama Flügels	1–5	Bellmare Hiratsuka	Kumamoto Suizenji Stadium
14:04 JST (UTC+09)	Zinho 38' (pen.)	J. League	Narahashi 22'; Nakata 41', 60'; Almir 55'; Noguchi 79'	Attendance: 11,608; Referee: Yoshitsugu Katayama; Assistant referees: Tōru Yamashiro, Hiroshi Tanabe; Fourth official: Akira Toyama; Man of the Match: Hidetoshi Nakata

10 May 1995 1st-15	Bellmare Hiratsuka	3–4 (V-goal) (a.e.t.)	JEF United Ichihara	Hiratsuka Stadium
19:01 JST (UTC+09)	Noguchi 37', 46'; Betinho 76'	J. League	Maslovar 36'; Ejiri 44', 89'; 107' (o.g.)	Attendance: 11,824; Referee: Juan Carlos Crespi; Assistant referees: Noboru Ishiyama, Hiroyuki Izumi; Fourth official: Akio Koizumi

13 May 1995 1st-16	Gamba Osaka	2–4	Bellmare Hiratsuka	Kyoto Nishikyogoku Stadium
16:03 JST (UTC+09)	Protassov 48'; Isogai 83' (pen.)	J. League	Almir 35'; Takada 78'; Sorimachi 79'; Betinho 89' (pen.)	Attendance: 15,119; Referee: Armando Perez; Assistant referees: Morihisa Yamaguchi, Kazuaki Hamaguchi; Fourth official: Hiroyuki Ishida; Man of the Match: Tetsuya Takada

17 June 1995 1st-17	Bellmare Hiratsuka	3–4 (V-goal) (a.e.t.)	Nagoya Grampus Eight	Hiratsuka Stadium
18:33 JST (UTC+09)	Almir 8', 37'; T. Iwamoto 43'	J. League	Okayama 10'; Stojković 22'; Hirano 48'; Torres 116'	Attendance: 14,163; Referee: Yōtarō Moritsu; Assistant referees: Hiroshi Fukuda, Masato Nogami; Fourth official: Susumu Takeda

21 June 1995 1st-18	Bellmare Hiratsuka	3–1	Urawa Red Diamonds	Hiratsuka Stadium
19:03 JST (UTC+09)	T. Iwamoto 4'; Betinho 56'; Nakata 89'	J. League	Fukuda 84' (pen.)	Attendance: 13,673; Referee: Fumikazu Shioyazono; Assistant referees: Takashi Kunori, Akihisa Makino; Fourth official: Jōji Kashihara; Man of the Match: Kazuaki Tasaka

24 June 1995 1st-19	Júbilo Iwata	4–1	Bellmare Hiratsuka	Tecnoport Fukui Stadium
14:03 JST (UTC+09)	Nakayama 27', 71'; Schillaci 61', 81'	J. League	Almir 35'	Attendance: 10,554; Referee: Shinichirō Obata; Assistant referees: Yasuhiro Hemmi, Kimio Izaki; Fourth official: Kazuya Takahara

28 June 1995 1st-20	Bellmare Hiratsuka	1–5	Cerezo Osaka	Hiratsuka Stadium
19:03 JST (UTC+09)	Nakata 74'	J. League	Minamoto 13'; Morishima 58'; Valdés 70', 83'; Kanda 79'	Attendance: 11,905; Referee: Juan Carlos Crespi; Assistant referees: Takayoshi Kashino, Takuji Fukazawa; Fourth official: Akio Koizumi

1 July 1995 1st-21	Yokohama Marinos	0–3	Bellmare Hiratsuka	Yokohama Mitsuzawa Football Stadium
19:00 JST (UTC+09)		J. League	69' (o.g.); Noguchi 72'; Betinho 81' (pen.)	Attendance: 12,767; Referee: Naotsugu Fuse; Assistant referees: Takashi Kunori, Tetsu Karakida; Fourth official: Michio Nakahara; Man of the Match: Kazuaki Tasaka

8 July 1995 1st-22	Bellmare Hiratsuka	3–2	Kashiwa Reysol	Ehime Matsuyama Athletic Stadium
18:31 JST (UTC+09)	Nakata 7'; Betinho 34' (pen.); Noguchi 75'	J. League	Valdir 27', 77'	Attendance: 11,560; Referee: Hiroyuki Umemoto; Assistant referees: Yasuhiro Hemmi, Satoru Kawano; Fourth official: Tatsuya Hyōdō; Man of the Match: Hidetoshi Nakata

12 July 1995 1st-23	Sanfrecce Hiroshima	1–0	Bellmare Hiratsuka	Hiroshima Stadium
19:03 JST (UTC+09)	Van Loen 33'	J. League		Attendance: 8,174; Referee: Yoshimi Ogawa; Assistant referees: Olaf Blumenstein, Tōru Yamashiro; Fourth official: Syūji Kagawa

15 July 1995 1st-24	Bellmare Hiratsuka	4–0	Shimizu S-Pulse	Hiratsuka Stadium
18:33 JST (UTC+09)	Noguchi 4', 25'; Betinho 5'; Nakata 45'	J. League		Attendance: 15,449; Referee: Hideo Kikuchi; Assistant referees: Kōji Taniuchi, Hisaharu Kitamura; Fourth official: Akio Koizumi; Man of the Match: Kōji Noguchi

19 July 1995 1st-25	Kashima Antlers	2–1	Bellmare Hiratsuka	Kashima Soccer Stadium
19:03 JST (UTC+09)	Honda 66'; Santos 75' (pen.)	J. League	Noguchi 41'	Attendance: 15,687; Referee: Armando Perez; Assistant referees: Hitoshi Yamada, Masato Nogami; Fourth official: Kazuhiko Kumagai

22 July 1995 1st-26	Bellmare Hiratsuka	2–3	Verdy Kawasaki	Hiratsuka Stadium
19:03 JST (UTC+09)	70' (o.g.); Sorimachi 72'	J. League	Hasebe 18'; Alcindo 49'; Takeda 89'	Attendance: 16,082; Referee: Hiroyuki Umemoto; Assistant referees: Yū Nakamura, Akihisa Makino; Fourth official: Susumu Takeda

12 August 1995 2nd-1	Verdy Kawasaki	3–1	Bellmare Hiratsuka	Kawasaki Todoroki Stadium
19:04 JST (UTC+09)	Alcindo 11'; Miura 16', 23'	J. League	Edson 57'	Attendance: 13,931; Referee: Yoshimi Ogawa; Assistant referees: Noboru Ishiyama, Takayoshi Kashino; Fourth official: Mineo Takada

16 August 1995 2nd-2	Bellmare Hiratsuka	1–2	Yokohama Flügels	Hiratsuka Stadium
19:03 JST (UTC+09)	Betinho 60' (pen.)	J. League	Evair 37'; Zinho 54'	Attendance: 13,189; Referee: Tatsumi Ōno; Assistant referees: Kazuaki Hamaguchi, Kōji Taniuchi; Fourth official: Susumu Takeda

19 August 1995 2nd-3	Shimizu S-Pulse	2–0	Bellmare Hiratsuka	Tokyo National Stadium
19:03 JST (UTC+09)	Sawanobori 44', 74'	J. League		Attendance: 32,663; Referee: Kenji Tanaka; Assistant referees: Takashi Kunori, Masato Nogami; Fourth official: Yoshikazu Ozaki

23 August 1995 2nd-4	Bellmare Hiratsuka	1–0 (V-goal) (a.e.t.)	Cerezo Osaka	Hiratsuka Stadium
19:00 JST (UTC+09)	Narahashi 93'	J. League		Attendance: 11,426; Referee: Zoran Petrović; Assistant referees: Tetsu Karakida, Satoru Kawano; Fourth official: Takatoshi Itō; Man of the Match: Akira Narahashi

26 August 1995 2nd-5	Kashiwa Reysol	3–0	Bellmare Hiratsuka	Kashiwa Hitachi Stadium
19:03 JST (UTC+09)	16' (o.g.); Sugano 33'; Careca 89'	J. League		Attendance: 15,865; Referee: Hideo Kikuchi; Assistant referees: Yū Nakamura, Akihisa Makino; Fourth official: Atsushi Nakamura

2 September 1995 2nd-6	Bellmare Hiratsuka	4–0	Sanfrecce Hiroshima	Hiratsuka Stadium
19:03 JST (UTC+09)	18' (o.g.); Noguchi 73', 77'; Takemura 85'	J. League		Attendance: 12,354; Referee: Tetsuya Hamana; Assistant referees: Hitoshi Yamada, Akio Okutani; Fourth official: Jōji Kashihara; Man of the Match: Taku Watanabe

6 September 1995 2nd-7	Urawa Red Diamonds	3–2	Bellmare Hiratsuka	Urawa Komaba Stadium
19:01 JST (UTC+09)	Fukuda 2', 77' (pen.); Toninho 66'	J. League	Noguchi 11'; Betinho 17'	Attendance: 20,417; Referee: Naotsugu Fuse; Assistant referees: Kazuaki Hamaguchi, Toshiyuki Mayuzumi; Fourth official: Ichirō Kuwabara

9 September 1995 2nd-8	Bellmare Hiratsuka	2–3 (V-goal) (a.e.t.)	Yokohama Marinos	Hiratsuka Stadium
19:04 JST (UTC+09)	Ōmoto 13'; Betinho 20' (pen.)	J. League	Bisconti 49' (pen.), 55'; M. Suzuki 95'	Attendance: 15,118; Referee: Keiichi Sunakawa; Assistant referees: Takeshi Ōkura, Akihisa Makino; Fourth official: Michio Nakahara

13 September 1995 2nd-9	Gamba Osaka	3–2 (V-goal) (a.e.t.)	Bellmare Hiratsuka	Expo '70 Commemorative Stadium
19:03 JST (UTC+09)	Isogai 29'; Aleinikov 37'; Gillhaus 108'	J. League	Takada 43'; Natsuka 59'	Attendance: 7,563; Referee: Alfredo Trentalange; Assistant referees: Yoshikazu Hiroshima, Tetsu Karakida; Fourth official: Akio Okutani

16 September 1995 2nd-10	Júbilo Iwata	5–2	Bellmare Hiratsuka	Júbilo Iwata Stadium
19:00 JST (UTC+09)	Schillaci 20', 85'; Fujita 34'; Hattori 61' (pen.); 89' (o.g.)	J. League	Nakata 38'; Betinho 78'	Attendance: 15,672; Referee: Armando Perez; Assistant referees: Noboru Ishiyama, Takashi Kunori; Fourth official: Toshiaki Futamata

23 September 1995 2nd-11	Bellmare Hiratsuka	2–2 (V-goal) (a.e.t.) (4–5 p)	JEF United Ichihara	Hiratsuka Stadium
15:03 JST (UTC+09)	Betinho 73'; Noguchi 82'	J. League	Maslovar 75'; Jō 87'	Attendance: 12,062; Referee: Yoshitsugu Katayama; Assistant referees: Hitoshi Yamada, Akihisa Makino; Fourth official: Tasuku Onodera
	Penalties
	(penalty scored) Betinho; (penalty scored) Noguchi; (penalty missed) Simão; (penalty scored) Takada; (penalty scored) Watanabe; (penalty missed) Natsuka		(penalty scored) Jō; (penalty missed) Vasilijević; (penalty scored) Manaka; (penalty scored) Shimokawa; (penalty scored) Maslovar; (penalty scored) T. Gotō

27 September 1995 2nd-12	Nagoya Grampus Eight	4–0	Bellmare Hiratsuka	Nagoya Mizuho Athletics Stadium
19:00 JST (UTC+09)	Durix 12'; Hirano 26'; Ogura 36', 69'	J. League		Attendance: 21,135; Referee: Zoran Petrović; Assistant referees: Tōru Yamashiro, Ichirō Inukai; Fourth official: Eiji Murakami

30 September 1995 2nd-13	Bellmare Hiratsuka	2–1 (V-goal) (a.e.t.)	Kashima Antlers	Hiratsuka Stadium
19:03 JST (UTC+09)	Noguchi 37'; Simão 108'	J. League	Leonardo 69'	Attendance: 14,663; Referee: Naotsugu Fuse; Assistant referees: Kazuaki Hamaguchi, Toshimitsu Yoshida; Fourth official: Hiroshi Yashiro; Man of the Match: Simão

4 October 1995 2nd-14	Yokohama Flügels	1–1 (V-goal) (a.e.t.) (4–5 p)	Bellmare Hiratsuka	Kagoshima Kamoike Stadium
19:04 JST (UTC+09)	Evair 20'	J. League	Simão 47'	Attendance: 11,905; Referee: Masayoshi Okada; Assistant referees: Hideaki Harada, Tetsu Karakida; Fourth official: Shōji Hamada; Man of the Match: Nobuyuki Kojima
	Penalties
	(penalty scored) Evair; (penalty missed) Zinho; (penalty scored) Maezono; (penalty scored) Miura; (penalty scored) Yamaguchi; (penalty missed) Sampaio		(penalty scored) Betinho; (penalty scored) Simão; (penalty scored) Takada; (penalty missed) Tasaka; (penalty scored) Watanabe; (penalty scored) Júnior

7 October 1995 2nd-15	Bellmare Hiratsuka	0–4	Shimizu S-Pulse	Tokyo National Stadium
15:06 JST (UTC+09)		J. League	T. Itō 20'; Sawanobori 41'; Marco 68'; Santos 74' (pen.)	Attendance: 34,883; Referee: Zoran Petrović; Assistant referees: Hiroshi Fukuda, Kō Ōishi; Fourth official: Keizō Yamazaki

14 October 1995 2nd-16	Cerezo Osaka	1–0 (V-goal) (a.e.t.)	Bellmare Hiratsuka	Osaka Nagai No.2 Stadium
13:00 JST (UTC+09)	Fukagawa 112'	J. League		Attendance: 10,213; Referee: Hideo Kikuchi; Assistant referees: Yasushi Tsuchimoto, Naoki Esumi; Fourth official: Tsuyoshi Miyake

18 October 1995 2nd-17	Bellmare Hiratsuka	0–1	Kashiwa Reysol	Hiratsuka Stadium
19:04 JST (UTC+09)		J. League	Tanada 5'	Attendance: 9,472; Referee: Yoshimi Ogawa; Assistant referees: Takashi Kunori, Kenichi Koshiyama; Fourth official: Yoshiharu Nakamura

21 October 1995 2nd-18	Sanfrecce Hiroshima	2–1	Bellmare Hiratsuka	Tottori Stadium
18:30 JST (UTC+09)	Takagi 3', 54'	J. League	Simão 53'	Attendance: 12,734; Referee: Zoran Petrović; Assistant referees: Satoru Kawano, Kōji Minami; Fourth official: Hiroshi Nishimura

1 November 1995 2nd-19	Bellmare Hiratsuka	2–3	Urawa Red Diamonds	Tokyo National Stadium
19:03 JST (UTC+09)	Betinho 22' (pen.); Noguchi 68'	J. League	Okano 9'; Hori 32'; Fukuda 39'	Attendance: 42,191; Referee: Tetsuya Hamana; Assistant referees: Hitoshi Yamada, Takuji Fukazawa; Fourth official: Masao Yamanaka

4 November 1995 2nd-20	Yokohama Marinos	2–1	Bellmare Hiratsuka	Yokohama Mitsuzawa Football Stadium
15:00 JST (UTC+09)	Zapata 19'; Bisconti 78'	J. League	Betinho 33' (pen.)	Attendance: 12,074; Referee: Hiroyuki Umemoto; Assistant referees: Yū Nakamura, Mitsuyoshi Nakaguma; Fourth official: Masahiko Takahashi

8 November 1995 2nd-21	Bellmare Hiratsuka	1–3	Gamba Osaka	Hiratsuka Stadium
19:03 JST (UTC+09)	Noguchi 19'	J. League	Hiraoka 18', 28'; Škrinjar 87'	Attendance: 8,320; Referee: Jamal Al-Sharif; Assistant referees: Yasuhiro Matsuzaki, Ichirō Inukai; Fourth official: Jōji Kashihara

11 November 1995 2nd-22	Bellmare Hiratsuka	0–1	Júbilo Iwata	Hiratsuka Stadium
15:03 JST (UTC+09)		J. League	Hattori 58' (pen.)	Attendance: 12,622; Referee: Naotsugu Fuse; Assistant referees: Kazuhisa Osada, Naoyuki Mori; Fourth official: Hisahito Okano

15 November 1995 2nd-23	JEF United Ichihara	2–4	Bellmare Hiratsuka	Ichihara Stadium
19:03 JST (UTC+09)	Ejiri 34'; Rufer 89'	J. League	Betinho 4', 33', 55'; Júnior 63'	Attendance: 7,928; Referee: Armando Perez; Assistant referees: Masahiro Katagiri, Toshimitsu Yoshida; Fourth official: Kōji Sugikawa; Man of the Match: Betinho

18 November 1995 2nd-24	Bellmare Hiratsuka	2–3 (V-goal) (a.e.t.)	Nagoya Grampus Eight	Hiratsuka Stadium
15:00 JST (UTC+09)	Nishiyama 34', 62'	J. League	Hirano 10'; Nakanishi 68'; Torres 90'	Attendance: 11,953; Referee: Yoshimi Ogawa; Assistant referees: Hideaki Harada, Ichirō Inukai; Fourth official: Sakae Ikeda

22 November 1995 2nd-25	Kashima Antlers	0–1	Bellmare Hiratsuka	Kashima Soccer Stadium
19:00 JST (UTC+09)		J. League	Edson 27'	Attendance: 15,703; Referee: Yasuhiro Matsuzaki; Assistant referees: Kimio Izaki, Kō Ōishi; Fourth official: Kunihiro Ōtsuki; Man of the Match: Edson

25 November 1995 2nd-26	Bellmare Hiratsuka	2–1	Verdy Kawasaki	Hiratsuka Stadium
15:00 JST (UTC+09)	Narahashi 6'; Takada 89'	J. League	Miura 34' (pen.)	Attendance: 15,294; Referee: Armando Perez; Assistant referees: Toshiyuki Mayuzumi, Naoyuki Mori; Fourth official: Susumu Takeda; Man of the Match: Tetsuya Takada

=== Emperor's Cup ===
3 December 1995 1st Round	Bellmare Hiratsuka	3–0	Nippon Denso	Kanazawa Soccer Stadium
: JST (UTC+09)	Betinho (?); Natsuka (?); Nakata (?)

10 December 1995 2nd Round	Bellmare Hiratsuka	0–1	Sanfrecce Hiroshima	Hiratsuka Stadium
: JST (UTC+09)			Takagi (?)

=== Super Cup ===
11 March 1995	Bellmare Hiratsuka	2–2 (2–4 p)	Verdy Kawasaki	Tokyo National Stadium
14:03 JST (UTC+09)	Noguchi 45'; Betinho 49'	J. League	Nunobe 82'; Alcindo 85'	Attendance: 53,167; Referee: Kiyoshi Ōta; Assistant referees: Tatsumi Ōno, Noboru Ishiyama; Fourth official: Naotsugu Fuse
	Penalties
	(penalty missed) Takada; (penalty scored) Tasaka; (penalty scored) Almir; (penalty missed) Nakata		(penalty missed) Kitazawa; (penalty scored) Pereira; (penalty scored) Bismarck; (penalty scored) Alcindo; (penalty scored) Hashiratani

== International results ==
=== Asian Cup Winners' Cup ===
1st Round	bye

10 October 1995 2nd Round-1	(Malaysia) Sabah	1–2	(Japan) Bellmare Hiratsuka	Kota Kinabalu, Malaysia
	? (?)		? (?) ? (?)

28 October 1995 2nd Round-2	(Japan) Bellmare Hiratsuka	5–0 (7–1 agg.)	(Malaysia) Sabah	Hiratsuka, Japan
	? (?) ? (?) ? (?) ? (?) ? (?)			Stadium: Hiratsuka Stadium

13 November 1995 Quarterfinals-1	(Japan) Bellmare Hiratsuka	6–0	(Indonesia) Petrokimia Putra	Hiratsuka, Japan
	? (?) ? (?) ? (?) ? (?) ? (?) ? (?)			Stadium: Hiratsuka Stadium

28 November 1995 Quarterfinals-2	(Indonesia) Petrokimia Putra	1–1 (7–1 agg.)	(Japan) Bellmare Hiratsuka	Gresik, Indonesia
	? (?)		? (?)

25 December 1995 Semifinals	(Japan) Bellmare Hiratsuka	4–3 (sudden-death) (a.e.t.)	(Japan) Yokohama Flügels	Hiratsuka, Japan
	? (?) ? (?) ? (?) ? ?'		? (?) ? (?) ? (?)	Stadium: Hiratsuka Stadium

27 December 1995 Final	(Japan) Bellmare Hiratsuka	2–1	(Iraq) Al Talaba	Yokohama, Japan
	? (?); Nakata (?)		? (?)	Stadium: Yokohama Mitsuzawa Football Stadium

== Player statistics ==
Pos.	Nat.	Player	D.o.B. (Age)	Height / Weight	J.League		Emperor's Cup		Super Cup		Dom. Total		Asian Cup Winners' Cup	
Pos.	Nat.	Player	D.o.B. (Age)	Height / Weight	Apps	Goals	Apps	Goals	Apps	Goals	Apps	Goals	Apps	Goals
DF	(Japan)	Katsuyoshi Shintō	September 15, 1960 (aged 34)	180 cm / 73 kg	2	0	0	0	0	0	2	0		
MF	(Brazil)	Edson	November 29, 1962 (aged 32)	183 cm / 75 kg	37	4	2	0	1	0	40	4		
MF	(Japan)	Yasuharu Sorimachi	March 8, 1964 (aged 31)	173 cm / 64 kg	21	3	2	0	0	0	23	3		
GK	(Japan)	Nobuyuki Kojima	January 17, 1966 (aged 29)	187 cm / 85 kg	47	0	2	0	1	0	50	0		
DF	(Japan)	Fujio Yamamoto	May 27, 1966 (aged 28)	179 cm / 72 kg	17	0	0	0	1	0	18	0		
MF	(Brazil)	Betinho	June 14, 1966 (aged 28)	172 cm / 70 kg	50	25	2	1	1	1	53	27		
DF	(Japan)	Hiroaki Kumon	October 20, 1966 (aged 28)	169 cm / 65 kg	27	0	2	0	0	0	29	0		
MF	(Japan)	Hiroaki Matsuyama	August 31, 1967 (aged 27)	171 cm / 70 kg	0	0	0	0	0	0	0	0		
GK	(Japan)	Kiyoto Furushima	April 3, 1968 (aged 26)	187 cm / 80 kg	6	0	0	0	0	0	6	0		
MF	(Brazil)	Simão	October 23, 1968 (aged 26)	182 cm / 70 kg	23	3	0	0	0	0	23	3		
FW	(Brazil)	Almir	March 26, 1969 (aged 25)	175 cm / 65 kg	21	8	0	0	1	0	22	8		
FW	(Japan)	Tadateru Ōmoto	April 6, 1969 (aged 25)	173 cm / 70 kg	13	1	0	0	0	0	13	1		
MF	(Japan)	Tetsuya Takada	July 31, 1969 (aged 25)	178 cm / 72 kg	27	4	1	0	1	0	29	4		
DF	(Japan)	Yoshihiro Natsuka	October 7, 1969 (aged 25)	182 cm / 72 kg	45	1	2	1	0	0	47	2		
FW	(Japan)	Kōji Noguchi	June 5, 1970 (aged 24)	177 cm / 68 kg	49	23	0	0	1	1	50	24		
MF	(Japan)	Hironari Iwamoto	June 27, 1970 (aged 24)	166 cm / 65 kg	34	0	0	0	1	0	35	0		
FW	(Japan)	Hirokazu Ōta	April 10, 1971 (aged 23)	181 cm / 72 kg	2	0	0	0	0	0	2	0		
MF/DF	(Japan)	Kazuaki Tasaka	August 3, 1971 (aged 23)	173 cm / 68 kg	47	1	0	0	1	0	48	1		
DF	(Japan)	Taku Watanabe	November 9, 1971 (aged 23)	187 cm / 79 kg	41	0	2	0	1	0	44	0		
DF	(Japan)	Akira Narahashi	November 26, 1971 (aged 23)	170 cm / 72 kg	46	4	2	0	0	0	48	4		
MF/DF	(Japan)	Teruo Iwamoto	May 2, 1972 (aged 22)	178 cm / 70 kg	18	2	1	0	1	0	20	2		
FW	(Japan)	Seiichi Igarashi	June 5, 1972 (aged 22)	180 cm / 68 kg	0	0								
GK	(Japan)	Hitoshi Sasaki	July 9, 1973 (aged 21)	178 cm / 75 kg	0	0								
FW/MF	(Japan)	Yoshiya Takemura	December 6, 1973 (aged 21)	166 cm / 61 kg	13	1	1	0	0	0	14	1		
MF	(Japan)	Daichi Matsuyama	January 11, 1974 (aged 21)	172 cm / 66 kg	9	0	0	0	0	0	9	0		
DF/MF	(Japan)	Kazuyuki Takahashi	May 10, 1974 (aged 20)	168 cm / 62 kg	0	0								
MF	(Japan)	Masato Harasaki	August 13, 1974 (aged 20)	178 cm / 70 kg	10	0	2	0	0	0	12	0		
FW	(Japan)	Takaaki Nakamura	September 8, 1974 (aged 20)	174 cm / 67 kg	0	0								
MF	(Japan)	Teppei Nishiyama	February 22, 1975 (aged 20)	176 cm / 69 kg	25	2	2	0	1	0	28	2		
MF	(Japan)	Jin Hiroi	April 3, 1975 (aged 19)	172 cm / 64 kg	0	0								
GK	(Japan)	Akihiro Yoshida	May 28, 1975 (aged 19)	183 cm / 75 kg	0	0								
DF	(Japan)	Keisuke Nakagawa	May 29, 1975 (aged 19)	170 cm / 62 kg	0	0								
DF	(Japan)	Masahiro Kuzuno	July 2, 1975 (aged 19)	180 cm / 73 kg	0	0								
FW	(Japan)	Hiroshi Sakai	October 19, 1976 (aged 18)	178 cm / 66 kg	0	0								
MF	(Japan)	Hidetoshi Nakata	January 22, 1977 (aged 18)	175 cm / 67 kg	26	8	2	1	1	0	29	9		
MF	(Japan)	Takayasu Kawai	March 7, 1977 (aged 18)	175 cm / 60 kg	0	0								
DF	(Brazil)	Júnior †	July 29, 1969 (aged 25)	178 cm / 76 kg	11	1	2	0	0	0	13	1		
FW	(Brazil)	Émerson †	July 28, 1973 (aged 21)	185 cm / 78 kg	2	0	0	0	0	0	2	0		

- † player(s) joined the team after the opening of this season.

== Transfers ==
In:

No.	Pos.	Nation	Player
—	MF	BRA	Simão (from Portuguesa)
—	MF	JPN	Hidetoshi Nakata (from Nirasaki High School)
—	MF	JPN	Takayasu Kawai (from Bellmare Hiratsuka youth)
—	FW	JPN	Hiroshi Sakai (from Yokkaichi Chuo Technical High School)

Out:

No.	Pos.	Nation	Player
—	GK	JPN	Masanori Chiba
—	DF	JPN	Norio Haryū
—	DF	JPN	Misao Hino
—	DF	JPN	Masahiro Ejiri
—	MF	JPN	Tamotsu Nakamura
—	MF	JPN	Takehiko Aoki
—	MF	JPN	Takeshi Shimizu
—	FW	BRA	Mirandinha
—	FW	JPN	Nobushige Kawada

== Transfers during the season ==
=== In ===
- (Brazil) José Alves dos Santos Júnior (on September)
- (Brazil) Émerson Luiz Firmino (on September)

=== Out ===
- (Brazil) Almir (on September)
- (Japan) Hiroaki Matsuyama (to Tosu Futures)

== Awards ==
none

== Other pages ==
- (in Japanese) J. League official site
- (in Japanese) Shonan Bellmare official website
