= José Luiz Drey =

Brazilian footballer and manager

Personal information
- Full name: José Luiz Drey
- Date of birth: September 23, 1973 (age 53)
- Place of birth: Brazil
- Height: 1.85 m (6 ft 1 in)
- Position: Defender

Senior career*
Years	Team	Apps	(Gls)
1993–1996	Atlético Sorocaba		
1996	Bellmare Hiratsuka	12	(0)
1997	Mogi Mirim		
1998	Ituano		
1999	Apucarana		
2000	Joinville		
2000–2001	Ituano		

Managerial career
- 2006: Ituano
- 2007: São Bento
- 2009: Ferroviária
- 2009: Marília
- 2010: São Bento
- 2012: Primavera
- 2014: Atlético Sorocaba
- 2015: São Bento
- 2017: Estanciano
- * Club domestic league appearances and goals

José Luiz Drey (born September 23, 1973), sometimes known as Zé Luiz, is a former Brazilian football player, coaching assistant, and manager.

== Club statistics ==
Club performance			League		Cup		League Cup		Total	
Season	Club	League	Apps	Goals	Apps	Goals	Apps	Goals	Apps	Goals
Japan			League		Emperor's Cup		J.League Cup		Total	
1996	Bellmare Hiratsuka	J1 League	12	0	0	0	3	0	15	0
Total			12	0	0	0	3	0	15	0
