= Koji Seki =

Japanese footballer

Koji Seki 関 浩二
Personal information
- Full name: Koji Seki
- Date of birth: June 26, 1972 (age 54)
- Place of birth: Ome, Tokyo, Japan
- Height: 1.76 m (5 ft 9 1/2 in)
- Position: Forward

Youth career
- 1988–1990: Yomiuri

Senior career*
Years	Team	Apps	(Gls)
1990–1993	Verdy Kawasaki	0	(0)
1994–1995	Tokyo Gas	53	(40)
1996–1998	Bellmare Hiratsuka	44	(7)
1998	Tokyo Gas	6	(0)
1998–1999	Consadole Sapporo	29	(6)
Total		132	(53)
Medal record
Verdy Kawasaki
Winner	Japan Soccer League	1990/91
Winner	Japan Soccer League	1991/92
Winner	J1 League	1993
Winner	JSL Cup	1991
Winner	J.League Cup	1992
Winner	J.League Cup	1993
Runner-up	Emperor's Cup	1991
Runner-up	Emperor's Cup	1992
- * Club domestic league appearances and goals

Koji Seki (関 浩二, Seki Koji; born June 26, 1972) is a former Japanese football player.

== Playing career ==
Seki was born in Ome on June 26, 1972. He joined Yomiuri (later Verdy Kawasaki) from youth team in 1990. However he could not play at all in the match. In 1994, he moved to Japan Football League club Tokyo Gas. He played as regular forward and scored many goals with Amaral. In 1996, he moved to Bellmare Hiratsuka. In June 1998, he returned to Tokyo Gas. In October 1998, he moved to Consadole Sapporo which performance was bad. However the club was relegated to J2 League end of 1998 season. He retired end of 1999 season.

== Club statistics ==
Club performance			League		Cup		League Cup		Total	
Season	Club	League	Apps	Goals	Apps	Goals	Apps	Goals	Apps	Goals
Japan			League		Emperor's Cup		J.League Cup		Total	
1990/91	Yomiuri	JSL Division 1	0	0	0	0	0	0	0	0
1991/92	Yomiuri	JSL Division 1	0	0	0	0	0	0	0	0
1992	Verdy Kawasaki	J1 League	-		0	0	0	0	0	0
1993	Verdy Kawasaki	J1 League	0	0	0	0	0	0	0	0
1994	Tokyo Gas	Football League	26	15	3	1	-		29	16
1995	Tokyo Gas	Football League	27	25	1	0	-		28	25
1996	Bellmare Hiratsuka	J1 League	21	6	3	1	15	8	39	15
1997	Bellmare Hiratsuka	J1 League	16	1	3	2	2	0	21	3
1998	Bellmare Hiratsuka	J1 League	7	0	0	0	0	0	7	0
1998	Tokyo Gas	Football League	6	0	0	0	-		6	0
1998	Consadole Sapporo	J1 League	4	0	3	2	0	0	7	2
1999	Consadole Sapporo	J2 League	25	6	2	1	1	0	28	7
Total			132	53	15	7	18	8	165	68
