= Ryoo Togashi =

Japanese footballer

Personal information
- Full name: Ryoo Togashi
- Date of birth: 4 April 1997 (age 29)
- Place of birth: Japan
- Height: 1.79 m (5 ft 10 1/2 in)
- Position: Midfielder

Team information
- Current team: Dynamic Herb Cebu
- Number: 17

Youth career
- Tokyo Verdy

College career
Years	Team	Apps	(Gls)
2016–2019	Toin University of Yokohama		

Senior career*
Years	Team	Apps	(Gls)
2020–2023	Briobecca Urayasu	38	(5)
2023	Dynamic Herb Cebu		
2024	Southern	10	(0)
2024-	Dynamic Herb Cebu	1	(0)
- * Club domestic league appearances and goals as of 30 September 2024

Ryoo Togashi (冨樫 凌央, Togashi Ryō; born 4 April 1997) is a Japanese professional footballer who plays as a midfielder.

== Club career ==
=== Youth and college career ===
Togashi played youth football for J.League side Tokyo Verdy. After graduating high school in 2016, he played for the college football team of Toin University of Yokohama, also playing for the club of the same name then-based in the Kanagawa Prefecture First Division. The club subsequently won the First Division and were promoted to the Kanto League Division 2, and were subsequently promoted to Division 1 in 2018.

=== Briobecca Urayasu ===
After graduating in 2020, Togashi joined Briobecca Urayasu of the Kantō Soccer League. In 2022, the club reached the finals of the Shakaijin Cup and won on penalties against BTOP Hokkaido, with Togashi coming on in the 68th minute. They were subsequently promoted to the Japan Football League. Togashi played 4 games in that league for the club before his departure was announced.

=== Cebu ===
On 15 August 2023, it was announced that Togashi would be one of the foreign reinforcements for Philippines Football League side Dynamic Herb Cebu in preparation for their campaigns in the Copa Paulino Alcantara and the 2023–24 AFC Cup. He made his debut in the club's starting XI in a 2–0 win over the University of the Philippines in the club's opening matchday in the cup.

=== Southern ===
On 15 January 2024, Togashi joined Hong Kong Premier League club Southern.

=== Return to Cebu ===
In September 2024, Togashi returned to Cebu.

== Personal life ==
Togashi was born in Japan. His father, Koichi Togashi, was himself a former football player and manager of J.League club Tokyo Verdy, where Togashi played his youth football.
