= Koichi Togashi =

Japanese association football player

Koichi Togashi 冨樫 剛一
Personal information
- Full name: Koichi Togashi
- Date of birth: July 15, 1971 (age 55)
- Place of birth: Kanagawa, Japan
- Height: 1.83 m (6 ft 0 in)
- Position: Defender

Team information
- Current team: Japan U20 (manager)

Youth career
- 1987–1989: Yomiuri

Senior career*
Years	Team	Apps	(Gls)
1990–1994	Verdy Kawasaki	2	(0)
1995	Yokohama Flügels	1	(0)
1996–1997	Consadole Sapporo	27	(1)
Total		30	(1)

Managerial career
- 2014–2016: Tokyo Verdy
- 2022: Japan U19
- 2022: Japan U20 (caretaker)
- 2023–: Japan U20
Medal record
Verdy Kawasaki
Winner	Japan Soccer League	1990/91
Winner	Japan Soccer League	1991/92
Winner	J1 League	1993
Winner	J1 League	1994
Winner	JSL Cup	1991
Winner	J.League Cup	1992
Winner	J.League Cup	1993
Winner	J.League Cup	1994
Runner-up	Emperor's Cup	1991
Runner-up	Emperor's Cup	1992
- * Club domestic league appearances and goals

Koichi Togashi (冨樫 剛一, Togashi Kōichi; born 15 July 1971) is a former Japanese football player and manager he is the current manager of Japan U20.

== Playing career ==
Togashi was born in Kanagawa Prefecture on July 15, 1971. He joined Yomiuri (later Verdy Kawasaki) from youth team in 1990. He could hardly play in the match. He moved to Yokohama Flügels in 1995. However, he could hardly play in the match, and he moved to Japan Football League club Consadole Sapporo. He played as center back and the club was promoted to J1 League end of 1997 season. He retired at the end of the 1997 season.

== Coaching career ==
After retirement, in 1998, Togashi started coaching career at Verdy Kawasaki (later Tokyo Verdy). In 2002, he moved to Consadole Sapporo. In 2003, he returned to Verdy. He mainly served as manager for youth team. In September 2014, top team manager Yasutoshi Miura was sacked and Togashi became a new manager as Miura successor. He managed the club until 2016.

== Personal life ==
Togashi's son Ryoo is also a professional footballer who currently playing for Hong Kong Premier League club Southern.

== Club statistics ==
Club performance			League		Cup		League Cup		Total	
Season	Club	League	Apps	Goals	Apps	Goals	Apps	Goals	Apps	Goals
Japan			League		Emperor's Cup		J.League Cup		Total	
1990/91	Yomiuri	JSL Division 1	0	0	0	0	0	0	0	0
1991/92	Yomiuri	JSL Division 1	0	0	0	0	0	0	0	0
1992	Verdy Kawasaki	J1 League	-		0	0	0	0	0	0
1993	Verdy Kawasaki	J1 League	2	0	0	0	4	0	6	0
1994	Verdy Kawasaki	J1 League	0	0	0	0	0	0	0	0
1995	Yokohama Flügels	J1 League	1	0	0	0	-		1	0
1996	Consadole Sapporo	Football League	14	0	1	0	-		15	0
1997	Consadole Sapporo	Football League	13	1	0	0	8	0	21	1
Total			30	1	1	0	12	0	43	1

== Managerial statistics ==
As of match played 27 May 2023

Team	From	To	Record				
Team	From	To	G	W	D	L	Win %
Tokyo Verdy	2014	2016	100	32	29	39	32.00
Japan U19	1 January 2022	31 December 2022	1	0	0	1	0.00
Japan U20 (caretaker)	11 September 2022	25 November 2022	6	5	0	1	83.33
Japan U20	1 January 2023	Present	8	5	0	3	62.50
Total			115	42	29	44	36.52
