= Tetsuya Takada =

Japanese footballer

Tetsuya Takada 高田 哲也
Personal information
- Full name: Tetsuya Takada
- Date of birth: July 31, 1969 (age 57)
- Place of birth: Hiroshima, Japan
- Height: 1.78 m (5 ft 10 in)
- Positions: Midfielder; defender

Youth career
- Hiroshima Kokutaiji High School
- Fukuoka University

Senior career*
Years	Team	Apps	(Gls)
1993–2000	Shonan Bellmare		
Medal record
Shonan Bellmare
Winner	Emperor's Cup	1994
- * Club domestic league appearances and goals

Tetsuya Takada (高田 哲也, Takada Tetsuya; born July 31, 1969) is a former Japanese football player.

== Playing career ==
Takada was born in Hiroshima Prefecture on July 31, 1969. After graduating from Fukuoka University, he joined Japan Football League club Fujita Industries (later Bellmare Hiratsuka, Shonan Bellmare) in 1993. He played many matches as many defensive position, defensive midfielder, left side back and center back. The club won the champions in 1993 and was promoted to J1 League. The club won the champions 1994 Emperor's Cup and 1995 Asian Cup Winners' Cup. However the club finished at bottom place in 1999 and was relegated to J2 League from 2000. He retired end of 2000 season.

After retirement, Takada became a youth coach, coaching for teams including Sanfrecce Hiroshima Youth and Nagoya Grampus U18.

== Career statistics ==
Appearances and goals by club, season and competition
Club	Season	League			Emperor's Cup		J.League Cup		Total	
Club	Season	Division	Apps	Goals	Apps	Goals	Apps	Goals	Apps	Goals
Fujita Industries	1993	Football League								
Bellmare Hiratsuka	1994	J1 League	15	0	0	0	1	0	16	0
Bellmare Hiratsuka	1995	J1 League	27	4	1	0	—		28	4
Bellmare Hiratsuka	1996	J1 League	12	1	3	0	0	0	15	1
Bellmare Hiratsuka	1997	J1 League	28	1	3	0	1	1	32	2
Bellmare Hiratsuka	1998	J1 League	18	0	0	0	3	0	21	0
Bellmare Hiratsuka	1999	J1 League	23	0	1	0	1	1	25	1
Shonan Bellmare	2000	J2 League	11	0	1	0	0	0	12	0
Career total			134	6	9	0	6	2	149	8
