= Simão (footballer, born 1968) =

Brazilian footballer

Personal information
- Full name: Reinaldo Vicente Simão
- Date of birth: October 23, 1968 (age 58)
- Place of birth: São Paulo, Brazil
- Height: 1.82 m (6 ft 0 in)
- Position: Midfielder

Senior career*
Years	Team	Apps	(Gls)
1990	Juventude		
1990–1993	Internacional		
1993	Corinthians Paulista		
1994	Portuguesa Desportos		
1995–1997	Bellmare Hiratsuka		
1998–2000	Portuguesa Desportos		
2001	São Caetano		
2002	Fenerbahçe		
2003	Ankaragücü		
2004	Goiás		
- * Club domestic league appearances and goals

Reinaldo Vicente Simão (born 23 October 1968), known as just Simão, is a Brazilian former professional footballer who played as a defensive midfielder. Simão played for several clubs throughout his career, most of which were in the Campeonato Brasileiro in the 1990s. He also spent three years at Japanese side Bellmare Hiratsuka, and had spell in the Turkish Süper Lig with Fenerbahçe and Ankaragücü.

== Club statistics ==
Club performance			League		Cup		League Cup		Total	
Season	Club	League	Apps	Goals	Apps	Goals	Apps	Goals	Apps	Goals
Japan			League		Emperor's Cup		J.League Cup		Total	
1995	Bellmare Hiratsuka	J1 League	23	3	0	0	-		23	3
1996	Bellmare Hiratsuka	J1 League	15	4	2	0	15	1	32	5
1997	Bellmare Hiratsuka	J1 League	12	3	0	0	5	0	17	3
Total			50	10	2	0	20	1	72	11
