= Hiroaki Matsuyama =

Japanese footballer and manager

Hiroaki Matsuyama 松山 博明
Personal information
- Full name: Hiroaki Matsuyama
- Date of birth: August 31, 1967 (age 59)
- Place of birth: Kyoto, Japan
- Height: 1.72 m (5 ft 7 1/2 in)
- Position: Midfielder

Youth career
- 1983–1985: Yamashiro High School

College career
Years	Team	Apps	(Gls)
1986–1989	Waseda University		

Senior career*
Years	Team	Apps	(Gls)
1990–1991	Furukawa Electric	0	(0)
1991–1995	Bellmare Hiratsuka	66	(3)
1995	Tosu Futures	4	(1)
1996	Consadole Sapporo	0	(0)
Total		70	(4)

Managerial career
- 2009: Oita Trinita
- 2010–2012: Bhutan
Medal record
Furukawa Electric
Runner-up	JSL Cup	1990
Bellmare Hiratsuka
Winner	Emperor's Cup	1994
- * Club domestic league appearances and goals

Hiroaki Matsuyama (松山 博明, Matsuyama Hiroaki; born August 31, 1967) is a former Japanese football player and manager. He managed the Bhutan national team. His brother Yoshiyuki Matsuyama is also former footballer.

== Playing career ==
Matsuyama was born in Kyoto Prefecture on August 31, 1967. After graduating from Waseda University, he joined Furukawa Electric in 1990. His brother Yoshiyuki Matsuyama also played this club then. However he could not play at all in the match. In 1991, he moved to Fujita Industries (later Bellmare Hiratsuka). He became a regular player and the club won the champions in 1993 and was promoted to J1 League from 1994. However he could hardly play in the match from 1994 and he moved to Japan Football League (JFL) club Tosu Futures in June 1995. However he could hardly play in the match. In 1996, he moved to JFL club Consadole Sapporo. However he could not play at all in the match and he retired end of 1996 season.

== Coaching career ==
After retirement, Matsuyama started coaching career at Consadole Sapporo in 1996. He coached the club until 1998. In 2004, he signed with Vissel Kobe and became a manager for reserve team in 1 season. In 2006, he signed with Oita Trinita. In July 2009, manager Péricles Chamusca was sacked. He managed the club in 1 match until the club signed with new manager Ranko Popović. In May 2010, he left the club and became a manager for Bhutan national team. He managed Bhutan until 2012.

== Club statistics ==
Club performance			League		Cup		League Cup		Total	
Season	Club	League	Apps	Goals	Apps	Goals	Apps	Goals	Apps	Goals
Japan			League		Emperor's Cup		J.League Cup		Total	
1990/91	Furukawa Electric	JSL Division 1	0	0			0	0	0	0
1991/92	Fujita Industries	JSL Division 1	29	1			3	0	32	1
1992	Fujita Industries	Football League	14	1			-		14	1
1993	Fujita Industries	Football League	18	1	1	0	5	0	24	1
1994	Bellmare Hiratsuka	J1 League	5	0	0	0	0	0	5	0
1995	Bellmare Hiratsuka	J1 League	0	0	0	0	-		0	0
1995	Tosu Futures	Football League	4	1	0	0	-		4	1
1996	Consadole Sapporo	Football League	0	0	0	0	-		0	0
Total			70	4	1	0	8	0	79	4

== Managerial statistics ==
Team	From	To	Record				
Team	From	To	G	W	D	L	Win %
Oita Trinita	2009	2009	1	1	0	0	100.00
Total			1	1	0	0	100.00
