= Rodrigo Batata =

Brazilian footballer (born 1977)

Personal information
- Full name: Rodrigo Pinheiro da Silva
- Date of birth: 10 September 1977 (age 49)
- Place of birth: Curitiba, Brazil
- Height: 1.62 m (5 ft 4 in)
- Position: Midfielder

Senior career*
Years	Team	Apps	(Gls)
1994	Paraná		
1995	Yokohama Flügels	22	(5)
1996–1998	Paris Saint-Germain		
1998–1999	Portimonense		
1999–2002	Malutrom		
2003	Paulista		
2004	Coritiba		
2004	Puebla		
2005-2007	Coritiba		
2007	Rio Branco-AC		
2007-2008	LD Alajuelense		
- * Club domestic league appearances and goals

Rodrigo Pinheiro da Silva (born 10 September 1977), known as Rodrigo Batata, is a Brazilian former footballer who played as a midfielder.

He scored five goals in 22 matches for Yokohama Flügels during the 1995 J.League.

Following a trial, Batata signed for Costa Rican club Alajuelense in September 2007.
