= Toninho Moura =

Brazilian football coach (born 1954)

Personal information
- Full name: Antonio Moura Sanches
- Date of birth: 22 July 1954 (age 72)
- Place of birth: Bauru, Brazil

Managerial career
- Years: Team
- 1994: Nacional-SP
- 1995: Atlético Sorocaba
- 1995: Inter de Limeira
- 1996: Bellmare Hiratsuka
- 2000–2001: Atlético Sorocaba
- 2002: Matonense
- 2003: Noroeste
- 2004: Taubaté
- 2005: Ferroviária
- 2006: União Mogi
- 2007–2008: São José
- 2008: Tupi
- 2009: Grêmio Barueri
- 2009: Ferroviária
- 2010: Sport Barueri
- 2011: Arapongas
- 2011: São José
- 2012: Grêmio Osasco
- 2013: Nacional-SP
- 2013: Grêmio Barueri

Antonio Moura Sanches, usually known as Toninho Moura (born 22 July 1954) is a Brazilian football head coach.

== Career ==
Moura was born in Bauru.

In 1996, Moura signed with J1 League club Bellmare Hiratsuka which many international player Hidetoshi Nakata, Akira Narahashi, Nobuyuki Kojima and so on played for. However the club results were bad and he resigned in September when the club was at the 11th place of 16 clubs.

== Managerial statistics ==
Team	From	To	Record				
Team	From	To	G	W	D	L	Win %
Bellmare Hiratsuka	1996	1996	19	8	0	11	42.11
Total			19	8	0	11	42.11

== Honours ==
União Mogi

- Campeonato Paulista Segunda Divisão: 2006
