= Osamu Taninaka =

Japanese footballer

Osamu Taninaka 谷中 治
Personal information
- Full name: Osamu Taninaka
- Date of birth: September 24, 1964 (age 62)
- Place of birth: Fuchu, Tokyo, Japan
- Height: 1.73 m (5 ft 8 in)
- Position: Forward

Youth career
- 1980–1982: Teikyo High School

Senior career*
Years	Team	Apps	(Gls)
1983–1991	Fujita Industries	138	(19)
1991–1995	Tosu Futures		
Total		138	(19)

International career
1984–1986	Japan	3	(0)
Medal record
Fujita Industries
Runner-up	Emperor's Cup	1985
Runner-up	Emperor's Cup	1988
- * Club domestic league appearances and goals

Osamu Taninaka (谷中 治, Taninaka Osamu; born September 24, 1964) is a former Japanese football player. He played for Japan national team.

== Club career ==
Taninaka was born in Fuchu on September 24, 1964. After graduating from high school, he joined Japan Soccer League club Fujita Industries in 1983. He moved to Regional Leagues club PJM Futures (later Tosu Futures) in 1991. He retired in 1995.

== National team career ==
On September 30, 1984, when Taninaka was 20 years old, he debuted for Japan national team against South Korea. He played 3 games for Japan until 1986.

== National team statistics ==
Japan national team
Year	Apps	Goals
1984	1	0
1985	0	0
1986	2	0
Total	3	0
