= Júnior (footballer, born 1969) =

Brazilian footballer

Personal information
- Full name: Jose Alves dos Santos Júnior
- Date of birth: July 29, 1969 (age 57)
- Place of birth: Brazil
- Height: 1.78 m (5 ft 10 in)
- Position: Defender

Senior career*
Years	Team	Apps	(Gls)
1995	Bellmare Hiratsuka	11	(1)
- * Club domestic league appearances and goals

Jose Alves dos Santos Júnior (born July 29, 1969), commonly known as Júnior, is a former Brazilian football player.

== Club statistics ==
Club performance			League		Cup		Total	
Season	Club	League	Apps	Goals	Apps	Goals	Apps	Goals
Japan			League		Emperor's Cup		Total	
1995	Bellmare Hiratsuka	J1 League	11	1	2	0	13	1
Total			11	1	2	0	13	1
