= Émerson (footballer, born 1973) =

Brazilian footballer

Personal information
- Full name: Émerson Luiz Firmino
- Date of birth: 28 July 1973 (age 53)
- Place of birth: Campinas, Brazil
- Height: 1.85 m (6 ft 1 in)
- Position: Striker

Youth career
- São Paulo

Senior career*
Years	Team	Apps	(Gls)
–1991	Bellinzago		
1991–1994	Hamburger SV	4	(1)
1994–1995	Holstein Kiel	24	(10)
1995	Bellmare Hiratsuka	2	(0)
1995–1996	Dnipro Dnipropetrovsk	14	(7)
1996–1997	FC St. Pauli	23	(1)
1997	Atletico Junior		
1997–1998	Grêmio		
1998–2001	MVV	71	(22)
2001–2002	KFC Uerdingen 05	33	(12)
2003	Qatar SC		
2003	Tianjin Teda		
2004	Union Berlin	5	(0)
2005	Club América		
2005–2006	Hapoel Petah Tikva	5	(0)
2006–2007	Real España		
- * Club domestic league appearances and goals

Émerson Luiz Firmino or simply Émerson (born 28 July 1973 in Campinas) is a Brazilian former professional footballer who played as a striker.

== Personal life ==
He lives in Germany with his wife.
